= Show Folks =

1928 film by Paul L. Stein

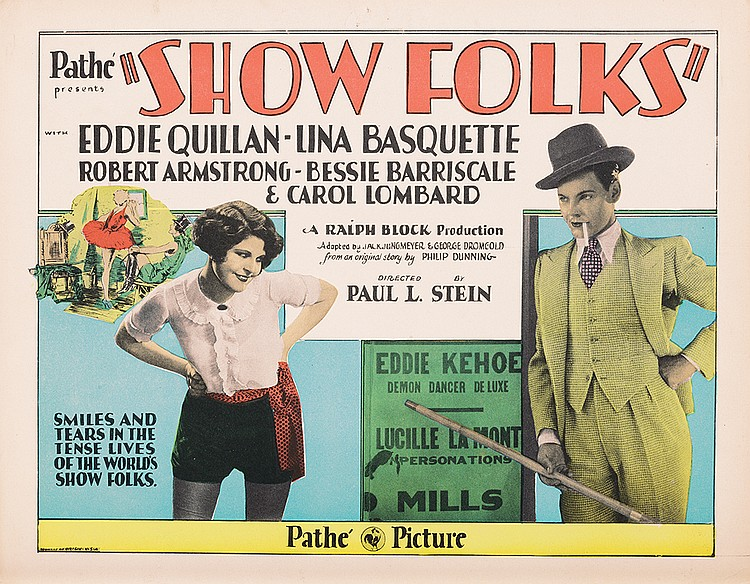
- Lobby card
- Directed by: Paul L. Stein
- Written by: John W. Krafft; Jack Jungmeyer; George Dromgold
- Produced by: Ralph Block
- Starring: Eddie Quillan; Lina Basquette; Carole Lombard
- Cinematography: David Abel; J. Peverell Marley
- Edited by: Doane Harrison
- Music by: Josiah Zuro
- Production company: Pathé Exchange
- Distributed by: Pathé Exchange
- Release date: October 21, 1928
- Running time: 70 minutes
- Country: United States
- Languages: Sound (Part-Talkie) (English Intertitles)

Show Folks is a 1928 American part-talkie sound drama film directed by Paul L. Stein and starring Eddie Quillan, Lina Basquette, and Carole Lombard. Although the film featured a few sequences with audible dialogue, the majority of the film had a synchronized musical score with sound effects. The film was released in both the sound-on-disc and sound-on-film format.

== Plot ==
Eddie Kehoe, a cocky young vaudeville dancer, blames everyone but himself—musicians, stage managers, electricians—when audiences don’t respond to his act. Though he barely scrapes by performing for the smaller venues booked by the McNary Vaudeville company, he remains confident in his solo talent.

Kitty Mayo, a once-famous burlesque queen now turned vaudeville veteran, takes a kindly, maternal interest in Eddie. She advises him to find a partner, assuring him that “all the big-timers do it.” Hurt at first, Eddie reconsiders and begins looking for someone to join his act.

He meets Rita Carey at a theatrical supply shop, where she’s dancing to encourage her trained duck during a demonstration. Struck by her charm and talent, Eddie lies to her, pretending to be a personal friend of McNary, the powerful head of the vaudeville circuit, and promises her a bright future as his partner. Rita agrees.

As they rehearse, Eddie quickly realizes Rita is graceful, creative, and a natural performer. Still, he criticizes her unpolished manner, urging her to be more demure. Rita, who sees through his brashness to a nervous young man trying to prove himself, takes his egotism in stride and grows fond of him. At the theatre, everyone warms to Rita—except Cleo, a baby-faced gold-digger who had hoped to become Eddie’s partner on and off stage.

On opening night, Rita is ready early and chats excitedly with two men backstage. They are charmed by her enthusiasm and later reveal themselves as McNary and Owens, a prominent revue producer. Realizing Eddie lied about knowing McNary, Rita is disappointed but remains loyal.

Though McNary and Owens find Eddie overbearing and amateurish, they recognize Rita’s star quality. Despite this, Eddie and Rita continue to perform together and eventually secure an engagement at the cabaret in the Hotel Metropole. One evening, Owens and McNary invite them to join their party at the club. Rita, trying to boost Eddie’s career, goes over to join them. Eddie, insecure and angry, sees her talking with the men and starts a jealous quarrel. Rita walks out, promising Owens she’ll visit his office the next day to discuss a part in his upcoming revue.

Eddie quickly replaces Rita with Cleo, who uses her charm to manipulate him. Soon, Variety prints news of their engagement. Riding the momentum of the act’s earlier success with Rita, Eddie and Cleo get booked on the big-time circuit. Meanwhile, Rita signs with Owens and is cast in a major featured role.

Despite their separation, Eddie and Rita still carry feelings for one another. They bump into each other on the street one day, and it’s clear the affection remains. The day before her revue opening, Kitty Mayo visits Rita and tells her Eddie and Cleo are opening that same night—and are sure to flop. Rita insists on going to help Eddie one last time.

At the theatre, Rita finds Eddie in his dressing room and runs through parts of their old routine, hoping to help him remember the best steps. Eddie calls in Cleo and asks her to let Rita demonstrate. But Cleo lashes out in a jealous tirade, berating Rita, Eddie, and Kitty. In a fit of rage, she tears off her costume and storms out, thinking she has sabotaged the show.

Instead, Rita dons the costume and steps in to perform with Eddie. Their act is a triumph. Watching from the wings, Owens tells Rita he won’t hold her to the revue contract—he loves her and wants her to be happy, knowing she belongs with Eddie.

After the show, Eddie is thrilled by the act’s success and Rita’s return—but true to form, he hides his feelings behind bravado. As they exit the stage, he loudly boasts, “I knocked ’em dead!” to those in the wings. Rita, understanding the boy beneath the bluster, smiles. She loves him just the same.

== Cast ==
- Eddie Quillan as Eddie Kehoe
- Lina Basquette as Rita Carey
- Carole Lombard as Cleo
- Robert Armstrong as Owens, the Promoter
- Crauford Kent as McNary, a Vaudeville Producer
- Bessie Barriscale as Kitty Mayo
- Richard Tucker as Vaudeville Performer
- Maurice Black as Vaudeville Performer
- Joan Bennett as Night Club Patron

== Music ==
The film featured a theme song entitled "No One But Me (Only Me)" which was composed by Billy Stone, Al Koppell and Charles Weinberg. Also featured on the soundtrack was a song entitled "My Heart Keeps On Speaking Of Love" composed by Gus Kahn and Joe Cooper. An additional song heard on the soundtrack was entitled "Love's First Kiss" by Lew Porter and Sam A. Perry.

== Preservation ==
This film survives at the French archive Centre national du cinéma et de l'image animée in Fort de Bois-d'Arcy, Library of Congress, and UCLA Film & Television Archive.

== See also ==
- List of early sound feature films (1926–1929)

== Bibliography ==
- Wes D. Gehring. Carole Lombard, the Hoosier Tornado. Indiana Historical Society Press, 2003.
