= The Cowboy and the Lady =

The Cowboy and the Lady may refer to:

Films:

- The Cowboy and the Lady (1911 film), starring Alan Hale Sr.
- The Cowboy and the Lady (1915 film), with S. Miller Kent and Helen Case
- The Cowboy and the Lady (1922 film), starring Mary Miles Minter and Thomas J. Moore
- The Cowboy and the Lady (1938 film), featuring Gary Cooper and Merle Oberon

Literature:

- The Cowboy and the Lady, an 1899 play by Clyde Fitch
- The Cowboy and the Lady, a 1982 novel by Diana Palmer

Albums:

- The Cowboy and the Lady (album), a 1969 album collaboration by Lee Hazlewood and Ann-Margret

Songs:

- "The Cowboy and the Lady", original title of "The Cowgirl and the Dandy", a 1977 song written by Bobby Goldsboro
