= Power (1928 film) =

1928 film by Howard Higgin

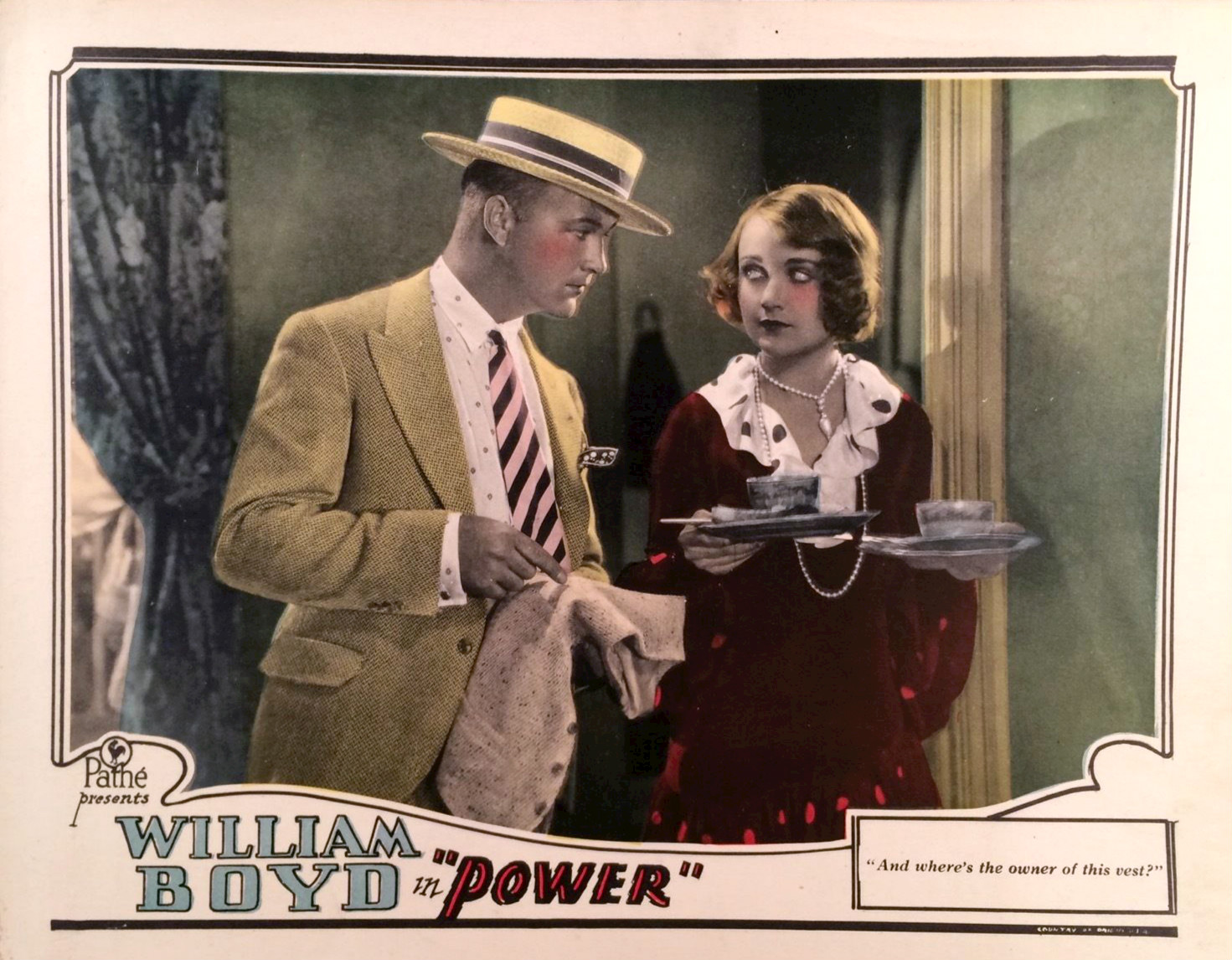
- Lobby card
- Directed by: Howard Higgin
- Written by: Tay Garnett; John W. Krafft
- Produced by: Ralph Block
- Starring: William Boyd; Alan Hale, Sr. Jacqueline Logan
- Cinematography: J. Peverell Marley
- Edited by: Doane Harrison
- Production company: Pathé Exchange
- Distributed by: Pathé Exchange
- Release date: September 23, 1928
- Running time: 7 reels
- Country: United States
- Language: Silent (English intertitles)

Power is a 1928 American silent comedy film directed by Howard Higgin and starring William Boyd, Alan Hale, Sr., and Jacqueline Logan.

== Cast ==
- William Boyd as Husky
- Alan Hale, Sr. as Hanson
- Jacqueline Logan as Lorraine LaRue
- Clem Beauchamp as The Menace
- Joan Bennett as a Dame
- Carole Lombard as Another Dame
- Pauline Curley as a Dame
- Frank Hagney as Job Foreman (uncredited)
- Monty O'Grady as Minor Role (uncredited)

== Bibliography ==
- Wes D. Gehring. Carole Lombard, the Hoosier Tornado. Indiana Historical Society Press, 2003.
