= Yipsee-I-O =

Song by Carmen Miranda with the Andrews Sisters
- Released: 1950
- Recorded: January 6, 1950
- Songwriter: Ray Gilbert
- Producer: MGM

"Yipsee-I-O" is a song written by Ray Gilbert, and recorded by Carmen Miranda with the Andrews Sisters on January 6, 1950. It was presented by Miranda in a musical number from the film Nancy Goes to Rio, produced by MGM.
