= Doane Harrison =

American film producer

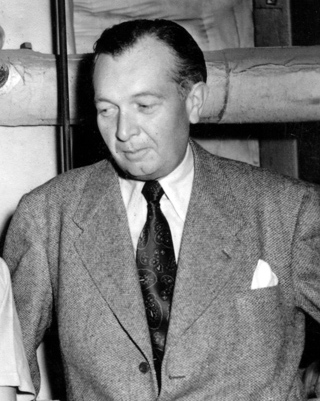
- publicity still of The Major and the Minor (1942)?
- Born: September 19, 1894; Paw Paw, Michigan, U.S.
- Died: November 11, 1968 (aged 74); Riverside, California, U.S.
- Occupation: Film editor
- Years active: 1923–1968
- Spouse: Grace Harrison
- Parent(s): George Milton Harrison & Maude Cornell Harrison

Doane Harrison (September 19, 1894 – November 11, 1968) was an American film editor whose career spanned four decades. For nearly twenty years, from 1935–54, he was a prolific editor of films for Paramount Pictures, including eleven films with director Mitchell Leisen. For twenty-five years, from 1941–1966, Harrison was editor, editorial supervisor or associate producer on all the films directed by Billy Wilder, who is now considered one of the great 20th-century filmmakers.

== Early career ==
Born in Paw Paw, Michigan, Harrison began his career during the silent film era. The earliest phase of his career and his education don't appear to have been documented. In 1925–1926, he was credited as the editor for nine films starring Richard Talmadge, and produced by Richard Talmadge Productions.

By 1928, he was editing films produced by Pathé Exchange. In 1933 he edited his eleventh (and last) film starring Richard Talmadge, On Your Guard. By 1935, Harrison had joined Paramount Pictures, one of the major Hollywood studios. Harrison remained at Paramount for more than eighteen years. His first film there was Four Hours to Kill! (1935), which was directed by Mitchell Leisen; at Pathé Exchange, Leisen had been the art director and Harrison the editor on three films. Their notable director-editor collaboration ultimately stretched over twenty-three years and eleven films, including Hold Back the Dawn (1941), which received six Academy Award nominations, Easy Living (1937), Midnight (1939), and Remember the Night (1940).

== Collaboration with Billy Wilder ==
Harrison is probably best remembered for his long association with Billy Wilder. As a new immigrant to the United States in the 1930s, Wilder had found work as a screenwriter for Paramount, where Harrison was also working as an editor. Wilder and Harrison both worked on Midnight in 1939, and again on Hold Back the Dawn in 1941. By 1942, Wilder had persuaded the management at Paramount to assign him as the director of the comedy The Major and the Minor; Wilder had previously directed just a single film in France. Wilder asked that Harrison be assigned as the film's editor. Wilder has been quoted as saying about this early assignment, "I worked with a very good cutter, Doane Harrison, from whom I learned a great deal. He was much more of a help to me than the cameraman. When I became a director from a writer my technical knowledge was very meagre." Sam Stagg has described their early collaboration, "In valuable early lessons, Harrison taught Wilder how to preplan each shot as part of a total editing scheme. The results: Time and money saved, and few protection shots required. (The term "protection shot", also called coverage, refers to footage shot from various setups and angles that may be needed for editing a sequence in the cutting room.)"

The Major and the Minor was successful, and launched Wilder's directing career. Harrison worked on all the films directed by Wilder for the next 25 years, through The Fortune Cookie (1966); their unusually close collaboration involved Harrison in filming as well as editing.

Harrison was credited as editorial supervisor on the next several films that Wilder directed, through Sunset Boulevard (1950). Harrison was credited as an "editorial consultant" on Sabrina (1954), which was the last film at Paramount for Wilder and Harrison. After leaving Paramount, Harrison was an associate producer on eight, and production associate on two of Wilder's films, from The Seven Year Itch (1955) through The Fortune Cookie (1966).

== Final cuts ==
Harrison's and Wilder's notable director-editor collaboration (as editor, editorial supervisor or advisor) had extended over ten films, from The Major and the Minor (1942) through Sabrina (1954). While he was working with Wilder, Harrison also edited more films by other directors; his final editing credit, for The Girl Most Likely (1958), was a reunion with director Mitchell Leisen. He acted as a consultant to Mike Nichols on Who's Afraid of Virginia Woolf? (1966), which was the first film Nichols directed.

Harrison was nominated three times for the Academy Award for Best Film Editing for three films directed by Wilder: Five Graves to Cairo (1943), The Lost Weekend (1945), and Sunset Boulevard (with Arthur P. Schmidt, 1950). Harrison died in 1968 in Riverside, California, aged 74.

== Selected filmography ==
Editor
Year	Film	Director	Notes	Other notes
1923	A Prince of a King	Albert Austin		
1925	Youth and Adventure	James W. Horne		
1925	Jimmie's Millions	James P. Hogan		
1925	The Fighting Demon	Arthur Rosson		
1925	The Mysterious Stranger	Jack Nelson	First collaboration with Jack Nelson	
1925	A Gentleman Roughneck	Grover Jones		
1925	The Prince of Pep	Jack Nelson	Second collaboration with Jack Nelson	
1926	The Blue Streak	Noel M. Smith	First collaboration with Noel M. Smith	
1926	The Night Patrol	Noel M. Smith	Second collaboration with Noel M. Smith	
1926	The Broadway Gallant	Noel M. Smith	Third collaboration with Noel M. Smith	
1926	The Better Man	Scott R. Dunlap	First collaboration with Scott R. Dunlap	
1926	Doubling with Danger	Scott R. Dunlap	Second collaboration with Scott R. Dunlap	
1928	Power	Howard Higgin	First collaboration with Howard Higgin	
1928	Man-Made Women	Paul L. Stein	First collaboration with Paul L. Stein	
1928	Celebrity	Tay Garnett	First collaboration with Tay Garnett	
1928	Show Folks	Paul L. Stein	Second collaboration with Paul L. Stein	
1928	The Cavalier	Irvin Willat		
1928	The Shady Lady	Edward H. Griffith		
1928	The Spieler	Tay Garnett	Second collaboration with Tay Garnett	
1929	The Leatherneck	Howard Higgin	Second collaboration with Howard Higgin	
1929	The Office Scandal	Paul L. Stein	Third collaboration with Paul L. Stein	
1929	High Voltage	Howard Higgin	Third collaboration with Howard Higgin	
1929	The Sophomore	Leo McCarey		
1929	Big News	Gregory La Cava	First collaboration with Gregory La Cava	
1929	The Racketeer	Howard Higgin	Fourth collaboration with Howard Higgin	Uncredited
1929	This Thing Called Love	Paul L. Stein	Fourth collaboration with Paul L. Stein	
1929	His First Command	Gregory La Cava	Second collaboration with Gregory La Cava	
1930	Her Man	Tay Garnett	Third collaboration with Tay Garnett	Uncredited
1932	Speed Madness	George Crone	First collaboration with George Crone	
1932	The Crooked Circle	H. Bruce Humberstone		
1933	On Your Guard	George Crone	Second collaboration with George Crone	
1933	The Sphinx	Phil Rosen	First collaboration with Phil Rosen	
1933	The Avenger	Edwin L. Marin		
1933	Devil's Mate	Phil Rosen	Second collaboration with Phil Rosen	
1935	Four Hours to Kill!	Mitchell Leisen	First collaboration with Mitchell Leisen	Uncredited
1935	Annapolis Farewell	Alexander Hall		
1935	Collegiate	Ralph Murphy		
1936	13 Hours by Air	Mitchell Leisen	Second collaboration with Mitchell Leisen	
1936	The Texas Rangers	King Vidor		
1936	Let's Make a Million	Ray McCarey		
1937	Internes Can't Take Money	Alfred Santell	First collaboration with Alfred Santell	
1937	Easy Living	Mitchell Leisen	Third collaboration with Mitchell Leisen	
1937	Thrill of a Lifetime	George Archainbaud		
1938	Stolen Heaven	Andrew L. Stone		
1938	Artists and Models Abroad	Mitchell Leisen	Fourth collaboration with Mitchell Leisen	
1939	Midnight	Mitchell Leisen	Fifth collaboration with Mitchell Leisen	
1939	The Night of Nights	Lewis Milestone		
1939	Remember the Night	Mitchell Leisen	Sixth collaboration with Mitchell Leisen	
1940	Golden Gloves	Edward Dmytryk		
1940	Arise, My Love	Mitchell Leisen	Seventh collaboration with Mitchell Leisen	
1940	Dancing on a Dime	Joseph Santley		
1941	Hold Back the Dawn	Mitchell Leisen	Eighth collaboration with Mitchell Leisen	
1941	New York Town	Charles Vidor	First collaboration with Charles Vidor	
1942	Take a Letter, Darling	Mitchell Leisen	Ninth collaboration with Mitchell Leisen	
1942	Beyond the Blue Horizon	Alfred Santell	Second collaboration with Alfred Santell	
1942	The Major and the Minor	Billy Wilder	First collaboration with Billy Wilder	
1943	The Crystal Ball	Elliott Nugent	First collaboration with Elliott Nugent	
1943	Five Graves to Cairo	Billy Wilder	Second collaboration with Billy Wilder	
1944	The Uninvited	Lewis Allen	First collaboration with Lewis Allen	
1944	Practically Yours	Mitchell Leisen	Tenth collaboration with Mitchell Leisen	
1946	Our Hearts Were Growing Up	William D. Russell	First collaboration with William D. Russell	
1947	Ladies' Man	William D. Russell	Second collaboration with William D. Russell	
1948	A Foreign Affair	Billy Wilder	Sixth collaboration with Billy Wilder	
1948	Miss Tatlock's Millions	Richard Haydn	First collaboration with Richard Haydn	
1951	Ace in the Hole	Billy Wilder	Eighth collaboration with Billy Wilder	
1952	Just for You	Elliott Nugent	Second collaboration with Elliott Nugent	
1956	Tension at Table Rock	Charles Marquis Warren		
1957	China Gate	Samuel Fuller		
1957	The Girl Most Likely	Mitchell Leisen	Eleventh collaboration with Mitchell Leisen	

Editorial department
Year	Film	Director	Role	Notes
1944	Double Indemnity	Billy Wilder	Editorial supervisor	Third collaboration with Billy Wilder
1945	The Unseen	Lewis Allen	Supervising editor	Second collaboration with Lewis Allen
1945	The Lost Weekend	Billy Wilder	Editorial supervisor	Fourth collaboration with Billy Wilder
1948	The Emperor Waltz	Billy Wilder	Editorial supervisor	Fifth collaboration with Billy Wilder
1949	Dear Wife	Richard Haydn	Editorial supervisor	Second collaboration with Richard Haydn
1950	Sunset Boulevard	Billy Wilder	Editorial supervisor	Seventh collaboration with Billy Wilder
1950	Branded	Rudolph Maté	Editorial supervisor	First collaboration with Rudolph Maté
1950	Mr. Music	Richard Haydn	Supervising editor	Third collaboration with Richard Haydn
1951	When Worlds Collide	Rudolph Maté	Editorial supervisor	Second collaboration with Rudolph Maté
1951	Thunder in the East	Charles Vidor	Editorial supervisor	Second collaboration with Charles Vidor
1952	Somebody Loves Me	Irving Brecher	Editorial consultant	
1953	The Girls of Pleasure Island	Alvin Ganzer; F. Hugh Herbert	Editorial advisor	
1953	Stalag 17	Billy Wilder	Editorial advisor	Ninth collaboration with Billy Wilder
1953	Forever Female	Irving Rapper	Editorial advisor	
1954	Sabrina	Billy Wilder	Editorial advisor	Tenth collaboration with Billy Wilder

Additional crew
Year	Film	Director	Role	Notes
1957	The Spirit of St. Louis	Billy Wilder	Production associate	Twelfth collaboration with Billy Wilder
1957	Witness for the Prosecution	Billy Wilder	Production associate	Fourteenth collaboration with Billy Wilder
1959	The Jayhawkers!	Melvin Frank	Assistant to producers	
1962	Convicts 4	Millard Kaufman	Assistant to producer	
1963	My Six Loves	Gower Champion	Production associate	
1966	Who's Afraid of Virginia Woolf?	Mike Nichols	Production advisor	

Producer
Year	Film	Director	Credit	Notes
1955	The Seven Year Itch	Billy Wilder	Associate producer	Eleventh collaboration with Billy Wilder
1957	Love in the Afternoon	Billy Wilder	Associate producer	Thirteenth collaboration with Billy Wilder
1959	Some Like It Hot	Billy Wilder	Associate producer	Fifteenth collaboration with Billy Wilder
1960	The Apartment	Billy Wilder	Associate producer	Sixteenth collaboration with Billy Wilder
1961	One, Two, Three	Billy Wilder	Associate producer	Seventeenth collaboration with Billy Wilder
1963	My Six Loves	Gower Champion	Associate producer	
1963	Irma la Douce	Billy Wilder	Associate producer	Eighteenth collaboration with Billy Wilder
1964	Kiss Me, Stupid	Billy Wilder	Associate producer	Nineteenth collaboration with Billy Wilder
1966	The Fortune Cookie	Billy Wilder	Associate producer	Twentieth collaboration with Billy Wilder

Documentaries

Editor
Year	Film	Director
1953	The Sea Around Us	Irwin Allen

== See also ==
- List of film director and editor collaborations
