= The Office Scandal =

1929 film

- Lobby card
- Directed by: Paul L. Stein
- Written by: Paul Gangelin; Jack Jungmeyer; John W. Krafft
- Starring: Phyllis Haver; Raymond Hatton; Margaret Livingston
- Cinematography: Jacob A. Badaracco
- Edited by: Doane Harrison
- Production company: Pathé Exchange
- Distributed by: Pathé Exchange
- Release date: March 3, 1929
- Running time: 69 minutes
- Country: United States
- Languages: Sound (Part-Talkie); English Intertitles

The Office Scandal is a 1929 American sound part-talkie drama film directed by Paul L. Stein and starring Phyllis Haver, Raymond Hatton and Margaret Livingston. In addition to sequences with audible dialogue or talking sequences, the film features a synchronized musical score and sound effects along with English intertitles. The soundtrack was recorded using the RCA Photophone sound-on-film system.

== Plot ==
With a whip clutched in his hand and a bullet hole in his chest, racehorse trainer Champ Tracy is found dead in the Randall estate stables, victim of an unknown assailant. His wife, the beautiful ex-actress Lillian Tracy, collapses in grief but offers no clue as to who might have killed him.

The newsroom of the Daily-Dispatch buzzes with excitement at the news, but when City Editor Pearson looks for a reporter to cover the sensational story, the only one on hand is Jerry Cullen, the paper’s “sob-sister,” who usually writes sentimental stories from the night court. As so often happens, Jerry is cheated out of the big chance when two male reporters wander in just in time to be assigned instead. Resigned, Jerry returns to her routine at night court.

There she encounters Andy Corbin, once a star newspaperman but now a seedy vagrant arrested for loitering. Jerry, moved by the fall of a once-great colleague, persuades the judge to release him. She even gives Andy her address, urging him to call if he ever wants to “brace up.”

Weeks later, the Tracy murder case has gone cold and entered the unsolved file. At this point Andy, desperate and shabby, comes to Jerry’s office seeking a loan. Jerry, still sympathetic, convinces Pearson to give him another chance at reporting, hoping the return to work will restore his pride. The assignment brings Andy back into the newspaper world — and back into the orbit of Jerry, who finds herself admiring his intelligence despite his rough edges.

Jerry is later sent to interview the widowed Lillian Tracy for a “sob-angle.” During their conversation, Jerry realizes that Lillian’s grief is a performance; beneath the tears lies calculation. Lillian, meanwhile, is far more interested in discovering Andy’s whereabouts. With careful manipulation, she tricks Jerry into admitting that Andy now works at the Daily-Dispatch.

Despite repeated phone calls, Andy avoids Lillian, unwilling to rekindle their past affair. Soon after, Andy and Jerry cover a glittering theater party together. Amid the assignment, their professionalism falters: Andy realizes he has fallen in love with the tough, compassionate “sob-sister.” But Lillian also attends the party, and when she corners Andy alone, she begs him to return to her. Andy resists and confesses that he loves Jerry. Spurned, Lillian’s passion curdles into jealousy and hatred, directed at both Andy and Jerry.

The next day, she summons Jerry to her apartment. With malicious delight, Lillian hints that she knows who killed her husband: a man she once loved, a man known to Jerry, identifiable by a scar on his forearm left by Champ Tracy’s whip. Jerry, thrilled by what she thinks is a scoop, rushes to Pearson with the revelation — unaware that she has just incriminated Andy. Pearson, who has independently traced a connection between Andy and Lillian, puts the pieces together, and the evidence looks damning.

Pearson warns Jerry to drop the story, knowing it could explode into scandal that would hurt her as well as the paper. But Jerry, thinking he is once again trying to edge her out of a big story, flares in anger and quits. She storms back to her apartment, only to find Andy waiting there. She vents about her humiliation, expecting his sympathy. Instead, she notices the guilty dread in his eyes — and then the scar on his forearm. Jerry freezes as the truth dawns: Lillian has succeeded in her vengeance.

Andy refuses to explain, bound by a pledge he once made to Lillian. In anguish, Jerry orders him to go before the police arrive. Soon, she receives a tip from the office boy Freddie and hurries to Lillian’s apartment, where Pearson and Captain Day are interrogating her. Lillian denies ever confessing anything, and Jerry is asked to confirm her earlier claim. Thinking quickly, Jerry retracts her story, saying it was all a fabrication to needle Pearson before she quit.

As the tension mounts, Lillian nearly faints. Jerry, trusting her instincts, hustles her into the bathroom and locks the door. With relentless pressure, Jerry forces the truth out of her: Lillian killed her own husband, and the scars on her back testify to the brutal beatings that drove her to it. Andy had once tried to protect her and was whipped across the arm in the attempt — explaining the scar.

When Andy is brought in between two detectives, Lillian confesses publicly to the crime, exonerating him at last. The case is closed, and Pearson, both relieved and impressed, gives Jerry the honor of writing the Dispatch’s big front-page story — no longer merely a sob-sister, but a full-fledged reporter.

== Cast ==
- Phyllis Haver as Jerry Cullen
- Raymond Hatton as Pearson, the City Editor
- Margaret Livingston as Lillian Tracy
- Leslie Fenton as Andrew 'Andy' Corbin
- Dan Wolheim as Champ Tracy
- Jimmie Adams as Delaney
- Clarence Geldart as Capt. Day
- Jimmy Aldine as Freddie, the Copy Boy
- Louise Carver as Battered Wife
- Tom O'Brien as Pool Hall Lookout
- Robert Emmett O'Connor as Judge
- Florence Wix as Party Guest

== See also ==
- List of early sound feature films (1926–1929)

== Bibliography ==
- Langman, Larry. Destination Hollywood: The Influence of Europeans on American Filmmaking. McFarland, 2000.
