= Alan Hale Sr. =

American actor (1892–1950)

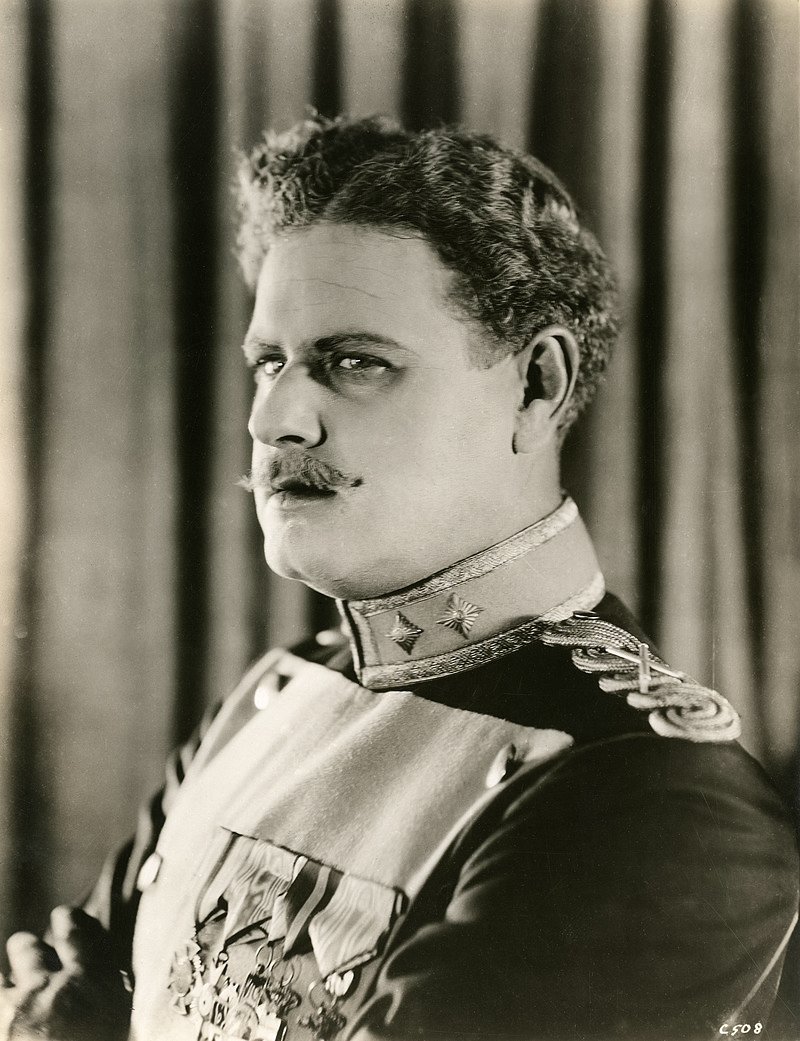
- Hale in 1922
- Born: Rufus Edward MacKahan; February 10, 1892; Washington D.C., U.S.
- Died: January 22, 1950 (aged 57); Los Angeles, California, U.S.
- Burial place: Forest Lawn Memorial Park
- Occupations: Actor, film director
- Years active: 1911–1950
- Spouse: Gretchen Hartman (m. 1914)
- Children: 3, including Alan Hale Jr.

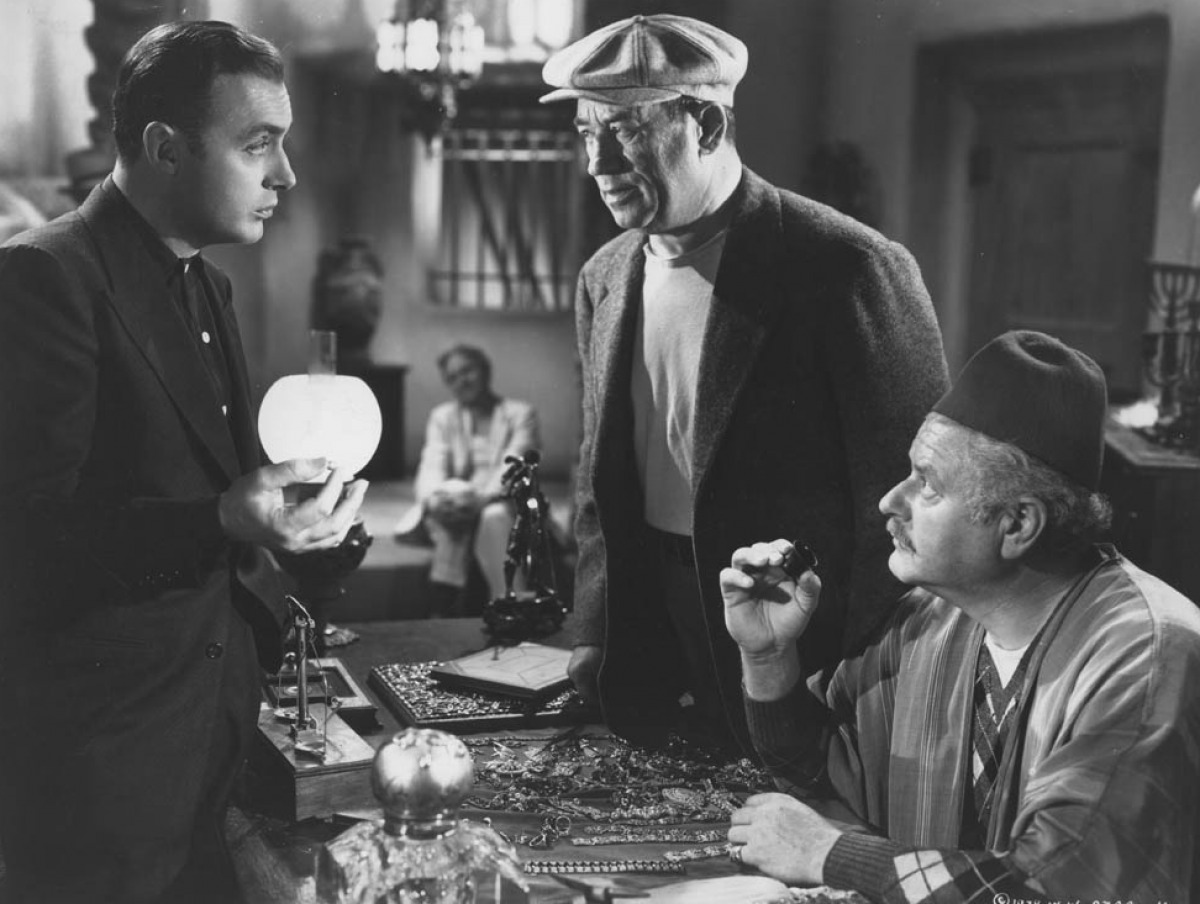
Charles Boyer, Stanley Fields and Hale in Algiers (1938)

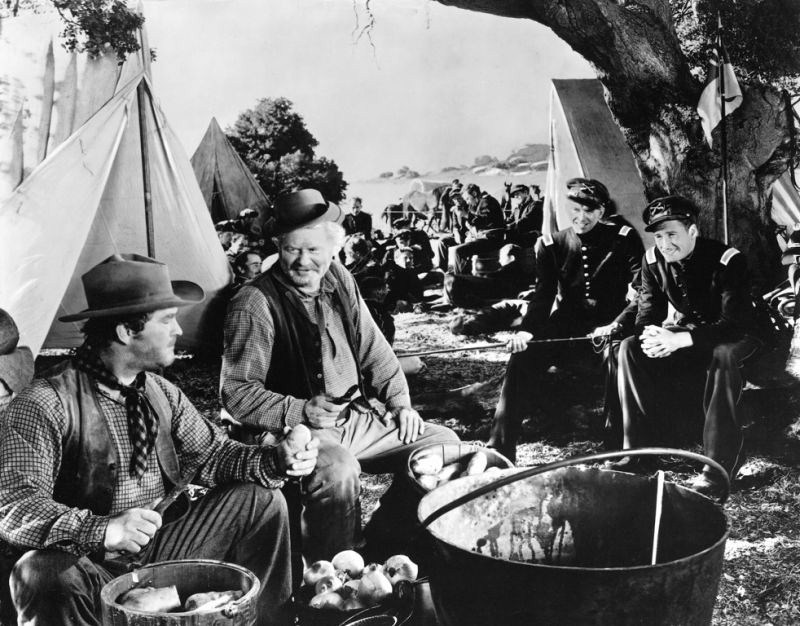
Left to right: Guinn "Big Boy" Williams, Hale, Ronald Reagan, and Errol Flynn in Santa Fe Trail (1940)

Alan Hale Sr. (born Rufus Edward Mackahan; February 10, 1892 – January 22, 1950), typically credited as Alan Hale, was an American actor and film director. He is best known for his many character roles during the Golden Age of Hollywood, in particular as a frequent sidekick of Errol Flynn. He also played in films supporting Lon Chaney, Wallace Beery, Douglas Fairbanks, James Cagney, Clark Gable, Cary Grant, Humphrey Bogart, and Ronald Reagan. In total, his career in film lasted 40 years.

His son, Alan Hale Jr., also became an actor and remains most famous for playing "the Skipper" on the television series Gilligan's Island.

== Early life ==
Hale was born Rufus Edward MacKahan in Washington, D.C. Before becoming an actor, he studied osteopathy at the University of Pennsylvania, and he also worked as an opera singer, journalist, and inventor.

== Career ==
His first film role was in the 1911 silent movie The Cowboy and the Lady. He became a leading man while working in 1913–1915 for the Biograph Company in their special feature film productions sponsored and controlled by Marc Klaw and Abraham Erlanger. Later, he became more of a character actor; he played "Little John" in the film Robin Hood (1922), with Douglas Fairbanks and Wallace Beery, reprised the role 16 years later in The Adventures of Robin Hood (1938) with Errol Flynn and Basil Rathbone, then played him once more in Rogues of Sherwood Forest (1950) with John Derek as Robin Hood's son, a unique 28-year string of portrayals of the same character in theatrical films. Hale played Hugh O'Neill, Earl of Tyrone, in The Private Lives of Elizabeth and Essex (1939), featuring a pivotal confrontation with the Earl of Essex, portrayed by Flynn.

His other films include the epic The Trap (1922) with Lon Chaney, Skyscraper (1928); as well as Fog Over Frisco with Bette Davis; Miss Fane's Baby Is Stolen with Baby LeRoy and William Frawley; The Little Minister with Katharine Hepburn; and It Happened One Night with Clark Gable and Claudette Colbert; (all released in 1934); Stella Dallas with Barbara Stanwyck; High, Wide, and Handsome (both 1937) with Irene Dunne and Dorothy Lamour; The Fighting 69th with James Cagney and Pat O'Brien; They Drive By Night with George Raft and Humphrey Bogart; Virginia City (all 1940) with Errol Flynn, Randolph Scott, and Humphrey Bogart; Manpower (1941) with Edward G. Robinson, Marlene Dietrich, and George Raft; and as the cantankerous Sgt. McGee in the This Is the Army (1943) with Irving Berlin. He also co-starred with Errol Flynn and Olivia de Havilland in the successful western film Dodge City (1939) where he played the slightly dimwitted but likable and comical Rusty Hart, sidekick to Flynn's character, Sheriff Wade Hatton. Hale co-starred with Errol Flynn in 13 movies.

Hale directed eight movies during the 1920s and 1930s and appeared in 235 theatrical films in total.

Hale also had success as an inventor. Among his innovations were a sliding theater chair (to allow spectators to slide back to admit newcomers rather than standing), the hand fire extinguisher, and greaseless potato chips.

== Personal life ==
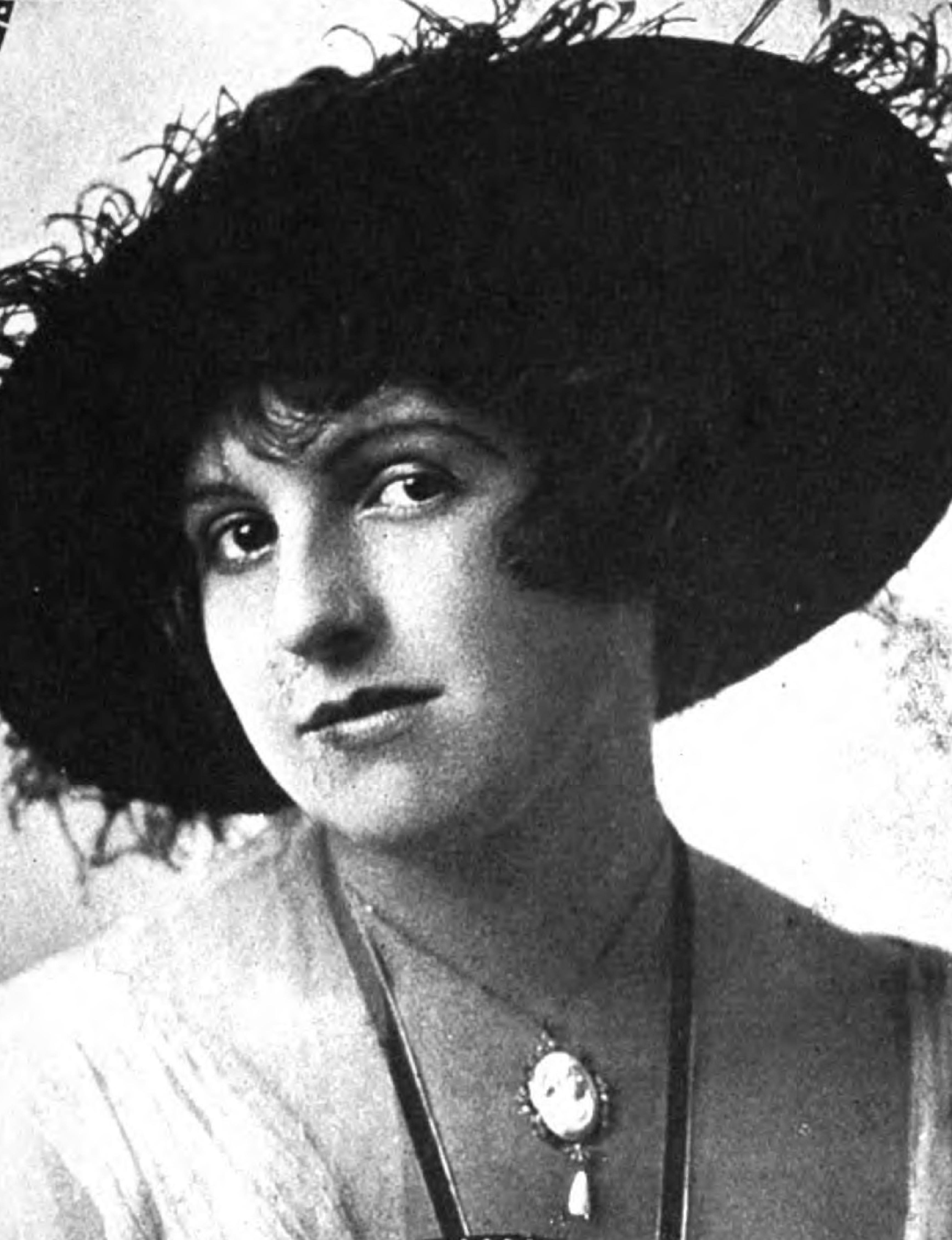
Gretchen Hartman

Hale's wife of over 30 years was Gretchen Hartman, a former child actress and silent film player. They had three children.

He was the father of actor Alan Hale Jr., best known as the Skipper in the Gilligan's Island television series. Father and son closely resembled one another, leading to occasional confusion after Hale Sr.'s death when Hale Jr. dropped the Jr. from his name. Hale Sr. and Hale Jr. both played the same character, Porthos the musketeer, in movies 40 years apart. Alan Hale Sr. played the character in the 1939 film Man in the Iron Mask, while Alan Hale Jr. played him in The Fifth Musketeer in 1979.

Alan Hale Sr. died at age 57 in Hollywood, California, on January 22, 1950, following a liver ailment and viral infection. He is interred in the Forest Lawn Memorial Park Cemetery in Glendale, California, next to his wife.

There is a street named after Hale in San Antonio, Texas.

== Filmography ==
- The Cowboy and the Lady (1911, film debut)
- Jane Eyre (1914)
- Strongheart (1914) as Ralph Thorne
- The Woman in Black (1914)
- Pudd'nhead Wilson (1916) as Tom Driscoll
- The Purple Lady (1916) as Count Louis Petelier
- The Woman in the Case (1916) as Julian Rolfe
- The Beast (1916)
- Rolling Stones (1916) as Jerry Braden
- The Scarlet Oath (1916) as John Huntington
- The Love Thief (1916) as Captain Arthur Boyce
- The Americano (1916)
- The Price She Paid (1917) as Stanley Baird
- One Hour (1917) as G.D. Stanley
- Life's Whirlpool (1917) as Dr. Henry Grey
- The Eternal Temptress (1917) as Count Rudolph Frizel
- Moral Suicide (1918) as 'Lucky' Travers
- The Four Horsemen of the Apocalypse (1921) as Karl von Hartrott
- The Barbarian (1921) as Mark Grant
- A Voice in the Dark (1921) as Dr. Hugh Sainsbury
- A Wise Fool (1921) as George Masson
- Over the Wire (1921) as James Twyford
- The Fox (1921) as Rufus B. Coulter
- The Great Impersonation (1921) as Gustave Seaman
- One Glorious Day (1922) as Ben Wadley
- A Doll's House (1922) as Torvald Helmer
- The Trap (1922) as Benson
- The Dictator (1922) as Sabos
- Robin Hood (1922) as Little John
- Shirley of the Circus (1922) as Max
- Quicksands (1923) as Ferrago
- The Covered Wagon (1923) as Sam Woodhull
- Hollywood (1923) as himself (cameo)
- Main Street (1923) as Miles Bjornstam
- The Eleventh Hour (1923) as Prince Stefan de Bernie
- Cameo Kirby (1923) as Colonel Moreau
- Long Live the King (1923) as King Karl
- Black Oxen (1923) as Prince Rohenhauer
- Code of the Wilderness (1924) as Willard Masten
- Girls Men Forget (1924) as Jimmy Masson
- One Night in Rome (1924) as Duke Mareno
- For Another Woman (1924)
- Troubles of a Bride (1924) as Gordon Blake
- Dick Turpin (1925) as Tom King
- Flattery (1925) as Arthur Barrington
- The Crimson Runner (1925) as Gregory
- The Wedding Song (1925, director)
- The Scarlet Honeymoon (1925, director)
- Ranger of the Big Pines (1925)
- Braveheart (1925) (directed)
- Hearts and Fists (1926) as Preston Tolley
- Forbidden Waters (1926, director)
- Vanity (1927) as 'Happy' Dan Morgan
- Rubber Tires (1927) (directed)
- The Wreck of the Hesperus (1927) as Singapore Jack
- The Leopard Lady (1928) as Caesar
- Skyscraper (1928) as Slim Strede
- The Cop (1928) as Mather
- Oh, Kay! (1928) as Jansen
- Power (1928) as Hanson
- Sal of Singapore (1928) as Captain Ericsson
- The Spieler (1928) as Flash
- The Leatherneck (1929) as Otto Schmidt
- Sailor's Holiday (1929) as Adam Pike
- The Sap (1929) as Jim Belden
- Red Hot Rhythm (1929) as Walter
- She Got What She Wanted (1930) as Dave
- Aloha (1931) as Stevens
- The Night Angel (1931) as Bezel
- Susan Lenox (Her Fall and Rise) (1931) as Jeb Mondstrum
- The Sin of Madelon Claudet (1931) as Hubert
- U-67 (1931) as Greg Winters
- The Sea Ghost (1931) as Capt. Greg Winters
- Union Depot (1932) as The Baron – a.k.a. Bushy Sloan
- So Big! (1932) as Klass Poole
- Rebecca of Sunnybrook Farm (1932) as Mr. Simpson
- The Match King (1932) as Borglund
- What Price Decency (1933) as Klaus van Leyden
- The Eleventh Commandment (1933) as Max Stager
- Destination Unknown (1933) as Lundstrom
- Miss Fane's Baby Is Stolen (1934) as Sam
- The Lost Patrol (1934) as Cook
- It Happened One Night (1934) as Danker
- Picture Brides (1934) as Von Luden
- Little Man, What Now? (1934) as Holger Jachman
- Fog Over Frisco (1934) as Chief O'Malley
- Of Human Bondage (1934) as Emil Miller
- The Scarlet Letter (1934) as Bartholomew Hockings
- Imitation of Life (1934) as Martin the Furniture Man
- Great Expectations (1934) as Joe Gargery
- There's Always Tomorrow (1934) as Henry
- Broadway Bill (1934) as Orchestra Leader (uncredited)
- Babbitt (1934) as Charlie McKelvey
- The Little Minister (1934) as Rob Dow
- Grand Old Girl (1935) as Click Dade
- The Good Fairy (1935) as Maurice Schlapkohl
- The Crusades (1935) as Blondel
- The Last Days of Pompeii (1935) as Burbix
- Another Face (1935) as Charles L. Kellar – Studio Head
- Two in the Dark (1936) as Police Inspector Florio
- A Message to Garcia (1936) as Dr. Ivan Krug
- The Country Beyond (1936) as Jim Alison
- Parole! (1936) as John Borchard
- Yellowstone (1936) as John Alexander Hardigan
- Our Relations (1936) as Joe Grogan -Denker's waiter
- God's Country and the Woman (1937) as Bjorn Skalka
- Jump for Glory (1937, a.k.a. When Thief Meets Thief) as Jim Diall 'Col. Fane'
- Thin Ice (1937) as Baron
- The Prince and the Pauper (1937) as Captain of the Guard
- High, Wide, and Handsome (1937) as Walt Brennan
- Stella Dallas (1937) as Ed Munn
- Music for Madame (1937) as Detective Flugelman
- The Adventures of Marco Polo (1938) as Kaidu
- Four Men and a Prayer (1938) as Mr. Furnoy
- The Adventures of Robin Hood (1938) as John Little, a.k.a. Little John
- Algiers (1938) as Grander
- Valley of the Giants (1938) as 'Ox' Smith
- The Sisters (1938) as Sam Johnson
- Listen, Darling (1938) as J.J. Slattery
- Pacific Liner (1939) as Gallagher
- Dodge City (1939) as Algernon 'Rusty' Hart
- The Man in the Iron Mask (1939) as Porthos
- Dust Be My Destiny (1939) as Mike Leonard
- The Private Lives of Elizabeth and Essex (1939) as Earl of Tyrone
- On Your Toes (1939) as Sergei Alexandrovitch
- The Fighting 69th (1940) as Sgt. 'Big Mike' Wynn
- Green Hell (1940) as Doctor Loren
- Alice in Movieland (1940, Short) as Carlo's Guest (uncredited)
- Three Cheers for the Irish (1940) as Gallagher
- Virginia City (1940) as Olaf "Moose" Swenson
- The Sea Hawk (1940) as Carl Pitt
- They Drive by Night (1940) as Ed J. Carlsen
- Tugboat Annie Sails Again (1940) as Capt. Bullwinkle
- Santa Fe Trail (1940) as Tex Bell
- The Strawberry Blonde (1941) as Old Man Grimes
- The Great Mr. Nobody (1941) as 'Skipper' Martin
- Footsteps in the Dark (1941) as Inspector Mason
- Thieves Fall Out (1941) as Rodney Barnes
- Manpower (1941) as Jumbo Wells
- The Smiling Ghost (1941) as Norton
- Captains of the Clouds (1942) as 'Tiny' Murphy
- Juke Girl (1942) as Yippee
- Desperate Journey (1942) as Flight Sergeant Kirk Edwards
- Gentleman Jim (1942) as Pat Corbett
- Action in the North Atlantic (1943) as Alfred "Boats" O'Hara
- This Is the Army (1943) as Sgt. McGee
- Thank Your Lucky Stars (1943) as Alan Hale
- Destination Tokyo (1943) as 'Cookie' Wainwright
- The Adventures of Mark Twain (1944) as Steve Gillis
- Make Your Own Bed (1944) as Walter Whirtle
- Janie (1944) as Prof. Matthew Q. Reardon
- Hollywood Canteen (1944) as himself (cameo)
- Roughly Speaking (1945) as Lew Morton
- Hotel Berlin (1945) as Herman Plottke
- God Is My Co-Pilot (1945) as Big Mike Harrigan
- Escape in the Desert (1945) as Dr. Orville Tedder
- Perilous Holiday (1946) as Dr. Lilley
- Night and Day (1946) as Leon Dowling
- The Time, the Place and the Girl (1946) as John Braden
- The Man I Love (1947) as Riley
- That Way with Women (1947) as Herman Brinker
- Pursued (1947) as Jake Dingle
- Cheyenne (1947) as Fred Durkin
- My Wild Irish Rose (1947) as John Donovan
- My Girl Tisa (1948) as Dugan
- Adventures of Don Juan (1948) as Leporello
- Whiplash (1948) as Terrance O'Leary
- South of St. Louis (1949) as Jake Everts
- The Younger Brothers (1949) as Sheriff Knudson
- The House Across the Street (1949) as J.B. Grinnell
- Always Leave Them Laughing (1949) as Sam Washburn
- The Inspector General (1949) as Kovatch
- Stars in My Crown (1950) as Jed Isbell
- Colt .45 (1950) as Sheriff Harris
- Rogues of Sherwood Forest (1950) as Little John (final film)
