= Destination Unknown (1933 film) =

1933 film

- Directed by: Tay Garnett
- Written by: Tom Buckingham
- Produced by: Carl Laemmle, Jr.
- Starring: Pat O'Brien; Ralph Bellamy; Alan Hale, Sr. Russell Hopton; Tom Brown; Betty Compson
- Cinematography: Edward Snyder
- Edited by: Milton Carruth
- Music by: W. Franke Harling
- Production company: Universal Pictures
- Distributed by: Universal Pictures
- Release date: April 1, 1933
- Running time: 66 minutes
- Country: United States
- Language: English

Destination Unknown is a 1933 American pre-Code drama film directed by Tay Garnett and written by Tom Buckingham. The film stars Pat O'Brien, Ralph Bellamy, Alan Hale, Sr., Russell Hopton, Tom Brown and Betty Compson. The film was released on April 1, 1933, by Universal Pictures.

== Plot ==
During a storm in the Pacific Ocean, the captain and the first helmsman on the sailing ship Prince Rupert are killed. The surviving crew is disoriented after the storm and the ship's water supplies are controlled by the cold-blooded Matt Brennan. Finally, a stowaway appears who knows other water supplies and navigates the ship to safe areas according to the stars. At the end of the film he finally disappears without a trace.

== Cast ==
- Pat O'Brien as Matt Brennan
- Ralph Bellamy as Stowaway
- Alan Hale, Sr. as Lundstrom
- Russell Hopton as Georgie
- Tom Brown as Johnny
- Betty Compson as Ruby Smith
- Noel Madison as Maxie
- Stanley Fields as Gattallo
- Rollo Lloyd as Dr. Fram
- Willard Robertson as Joe Shano
- Charles Middleton as Turk
- Richard Alexander as Alex
- Forrester Harvey as Ring
- George Regas as Tauru
