= Big News (film) =

1929 film

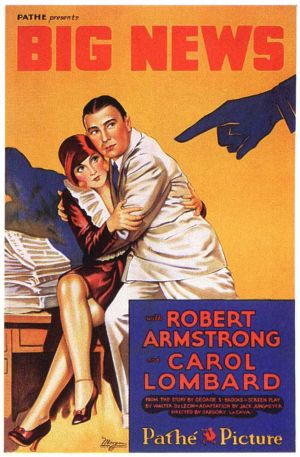
- Original theatrical poster
- Directed by: Gregory La Cava
- Written by: Walter DeLeon; Jack Jungmeyer; Frank Reicher
- Based on: For Two Cents by George S. Brooks
- Produced by: Ralph Block
- Starring: Robert Armstrong; Carole Lombard
- Cinematography: Norbert Brodine; Arthur C. Miller; John Mescall
- Edited by: Doane Harrison
- Distributed by: Pathé Exchange
- Release date: September 7, 1929
- Running time: 75 minutes
- Country: United States
- Language: English

Big News is a 1929 American pre-Code film directed by Gregory La Cava, released by Pathé Exchange, and starring Robert Armstrong and Carole Lombard, billed as "Carol Lombard".

== Plot ==
The film

Steve Banks is a hard-drinking newspaper reporter. His wife Margaret, a reporter for a rival paper, threatens to divorce him if he does not quit the drinking that is compromising his career. Steve pursues a story about drug dealers even when his editor fires him. When the editor is murdered, Steve is accused of the killing.

== Cast ==
- Robert Armstrong as Steve Banks
- Carole Lombard as Margaret Banks (billed as Carol Lombard)
- Louis Payne as Hensel
- Wade Boteler as O'Neill
- Charles Sellon as Addison
- Sam Hardy as Reno
- Tom Kennedy as Officer Ryan
- Warner Richmond as District Attorney Phelps
- Helen Ainsworth as Vera, society editor
- James Donlan as Deke
- George "Gabby" Hayes as Hoffman, reporter
- Vernon Steele as reporter
- Clarence Wilson as Coroner
- Colin Chase as Birn
- Robert Dudley as Telegraph editor

== Preservation status ==
The film exists in a 16mm reduction print.

== See also ==
- List of early sound feature films (1926–1929)
