= There You Are! =

1926 film directed by Edward Sedgwick

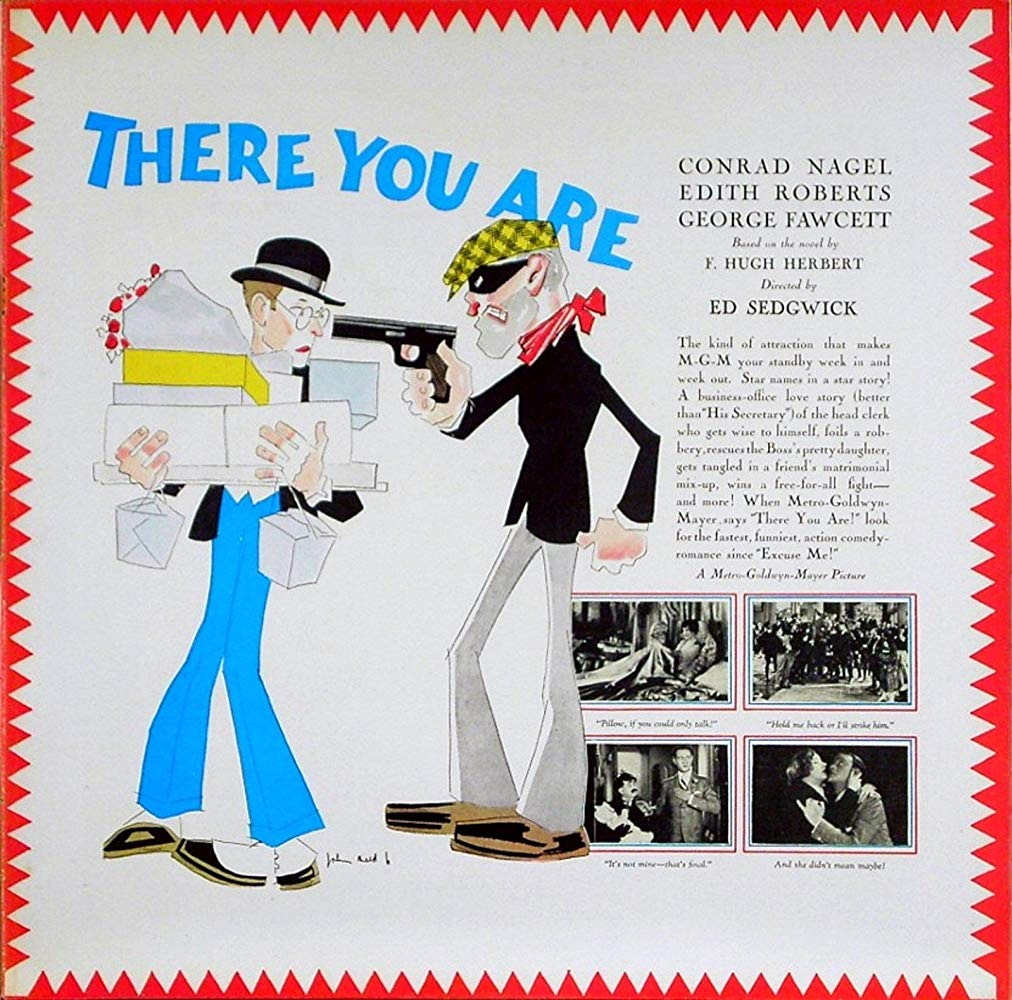
- Directed by: Edward Sedgwick
- Written by: Tay Garnett; Ralph Spence (titles)
- Screenplay by: F. Hugh Herbert
- Based on: There You Are by F. Hugh Herbert
- Starring: Conrad Nagel; Edith Roberts
- Cinematography: Benjamin F. Reynolds
- Edited by: Arthur Johns
- Distributed by: Metro-Goldwyn-Mayer
- Release date: November 28, 1926 (United States)
- Running time: 60 mins.
- Country: United States
- Languages: Silent; English intertitles

There You Are! is a lost 1926 American silent comedy film directed by Edward Sedgwick. Based on the play of the same name by F. Hugh Herbert, the film starred Conrad Nagel and Edith Roberts.

== Plot ==
George is a clerk who captures a bandit, and in return gets the boss' daughter.

== Cast ==
- Conrad Nagel as George Fenwick
- Edith Roberts as Joan Randolph
- George Fawcett as William Randolph
- Gwen Lee as Anita Grant
- Eddie Gribbon as Eddie Gibbs
- Phillips Smalley as J. Bertram Peters
- Gertrude Bennett as Mrs. Gibbs

== Preservation ==
With no holdings located in archives, There You Are! is considered a lost film.
