= The Racketeer =

1929 film

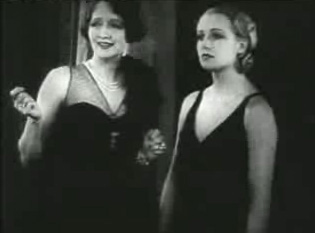
- Hedda Hopper and Carole Lombard
- Directed by: Howard Higgin
- Written by: Paul Gangelin (story and screenplay); A.A. Kline (dialogue)
- Produced by: Ralph Block
- Starring: Hedda Hopper; Carole Lombard
- Cinematography: David Abel
- Edited by: Jack Ogilvie; Doane Harrison
- Distributed by: Pathé Exchange
- Release date: November 9, 1929
- Running time: 68 minutes
- Country: United States
- Language: English

The Racketeer is a 1929 American Pre-Code drama film. Directed by Howard Higgin, the film is also known as Love's Conquest in the United Kingdom. It tells the tale of some members of the criminal class in 1920s America, and in particular one man and one woman's attempts to help him. Gossip columnist Hedda Hopper appears in a minor role. The film is one of the early talkies, and as a result, dialogue is very sparse.

== Plot ==
The full film

A busker playing a violin is harassed by a group of street punks until Police Officer Mehaffy (Paul Hurst) chases them away. The intoxicated violinist passes out. When Mehaffy is about to arrest him for vagrancy the powerful Mahlon Keane (Robert Armstrong) places $50 in the violinist's pocket and has the officer place him in the next taxi where Keane will pay for a night's accommodation at the YMCA for him to sleep it off. The nearest taxi contains socialite Rhoda Philbrooke (Carole Lombard) who knows the violinist as her lover Tony Vaughan (Roland Drew); she takes him in her taxi.

Mahlon and Rhoda meet again at a fundraiser for an orphanage, with Mahlon acting as the banker at the poker table. Mahlon views Rhoda cheating at cards and covers up her indiscretion with some sleight of hand. The pair fall in love with Mahlon providing Tony's alcohol detoxification that returns him to his career as a concert violinist.

Mahlon is regarded as an important person between the forces of law and criminality. When criminal Bernie Weber (Budd Fine) disobeys Mahlon by carrying out a crime, the wheels are set in motion for a gang war.

== Cast ==
- Robert Armstrong as Mahlon Keane
- Carole Lombard as Rhoda Philbrooke
- Roland Drew as Tony Vaughan
- Paul Hurst as Mehaffy, a Policeman
- Kit Guard as Gus
- Al Hill as Squid
- Bobby Dunn as The Rat
- Budd Fine as Bernie Weber
- Hedda Hopper as Mrs. Karen Lee
- Jeanette Loff as Millie Chapman
- John Loder as Jack Oakhurst
- Winter Hall as Mr. Sam Chapman
- Winifred Harris as Mrs. Margaret Chapman
- Robert Parrish as Street Urchin (uncredited)
- Phillips Smalley as Roulette Player (uncredited)

== Reception ==
The Racketeer was banned by the British Board of Film Censors in 1929, but the 61 minute film Love's Conquest was passed in 1930.

== See also ==
- List of early sound feature films (1926–1929)
