= His First Command =

1929 film

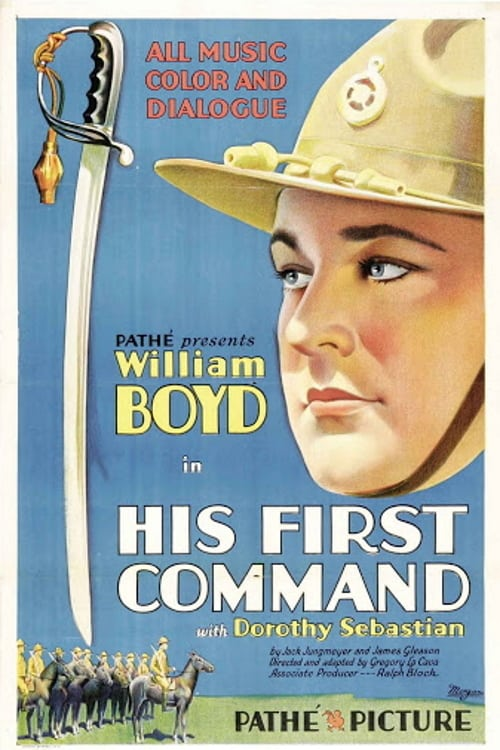
- Directed by: Gregory La Cava
- Written by: Jack Jungmeyer; James Gleason; Gregory La Cava
- Produced by: Ralph Block
- Starring: William Boyd; Dorothy Sebastian; Gavin Gordon
- Cinematography: John J. Mescall; Arthur C. Miller
- Edited by: Doane Harrison
- Production company: Pathé Exchange
- Distributed by: Pathé Exchange
- Release date: December 28, 1929
- Running time: 65 minutes
- Country: United States
- Language: English

His First Command is a 1929 American pre-Code comedy action film directed by Gregory La Cava and starring William Boyd, Dorothy Sebastian and Gavin Gordon. Location shooting took place at Fort Riley in Kansas. The film featured color sequences in Multicolor.

== Synopsis ==
The film

A playboy falls in love with the daughter of the commandant of an American post. He enlists in order to be close to her, but soon finds that his manners irritate the other soldiers.

== Cast ==
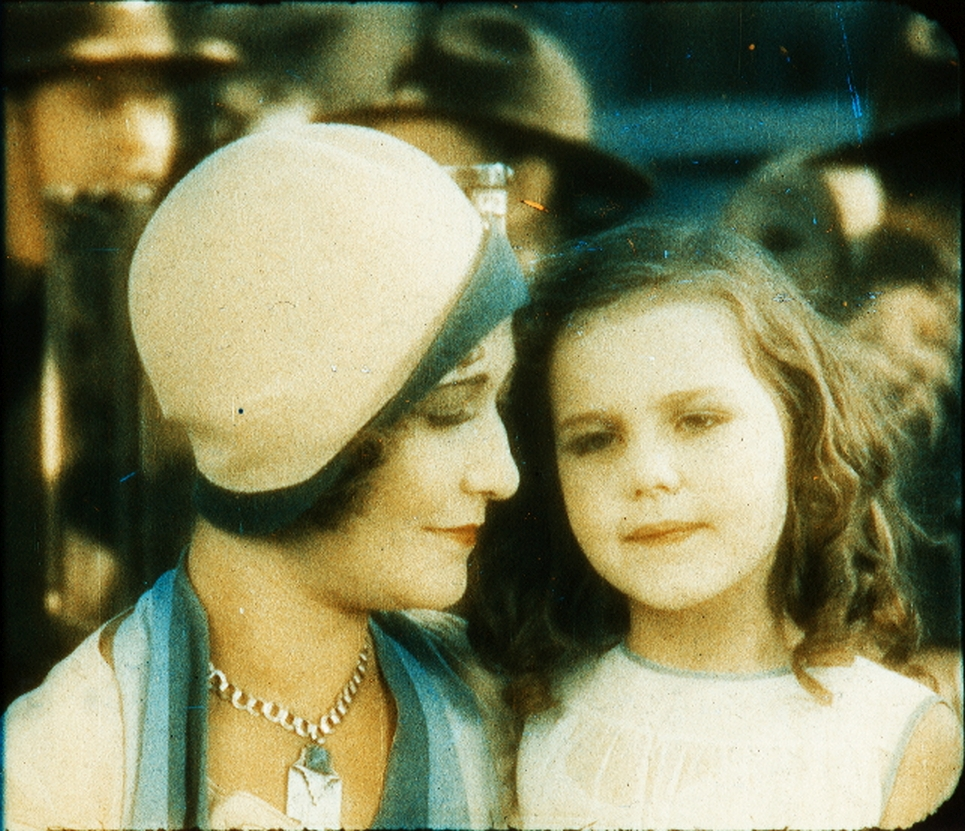
Multicolor scene from "His First Command" 1929 depicting Dorothy Sebastian and Helen Parrish

- William Boyd as Terry Culver
- Dorothy Sebastian as Judy Gaylord
- Gavin Gordon as Lt. Freddie Allen
- Helen Parrish as Jane Sargent
- Alphonse Ethier as Col. Gaylord
- Howard Hickman as Maj. Hall
- Paul Hurst as Sgt. Westbrook
- Jules Cowles as Cpl. Jones
- Rose Tapley as Mrs. Pike
- Mabel Van Buren as Mrs. Sargent
- Charles R. Moore as Homer

== Bibliography ==
- Munden, Kenneth White. The American Film Institute Catalog of Motion Pictures Produced in the United States, Part 1. University of California Press, 1997.
