= Rubber Tires =

1927 silent film by Alan Hale

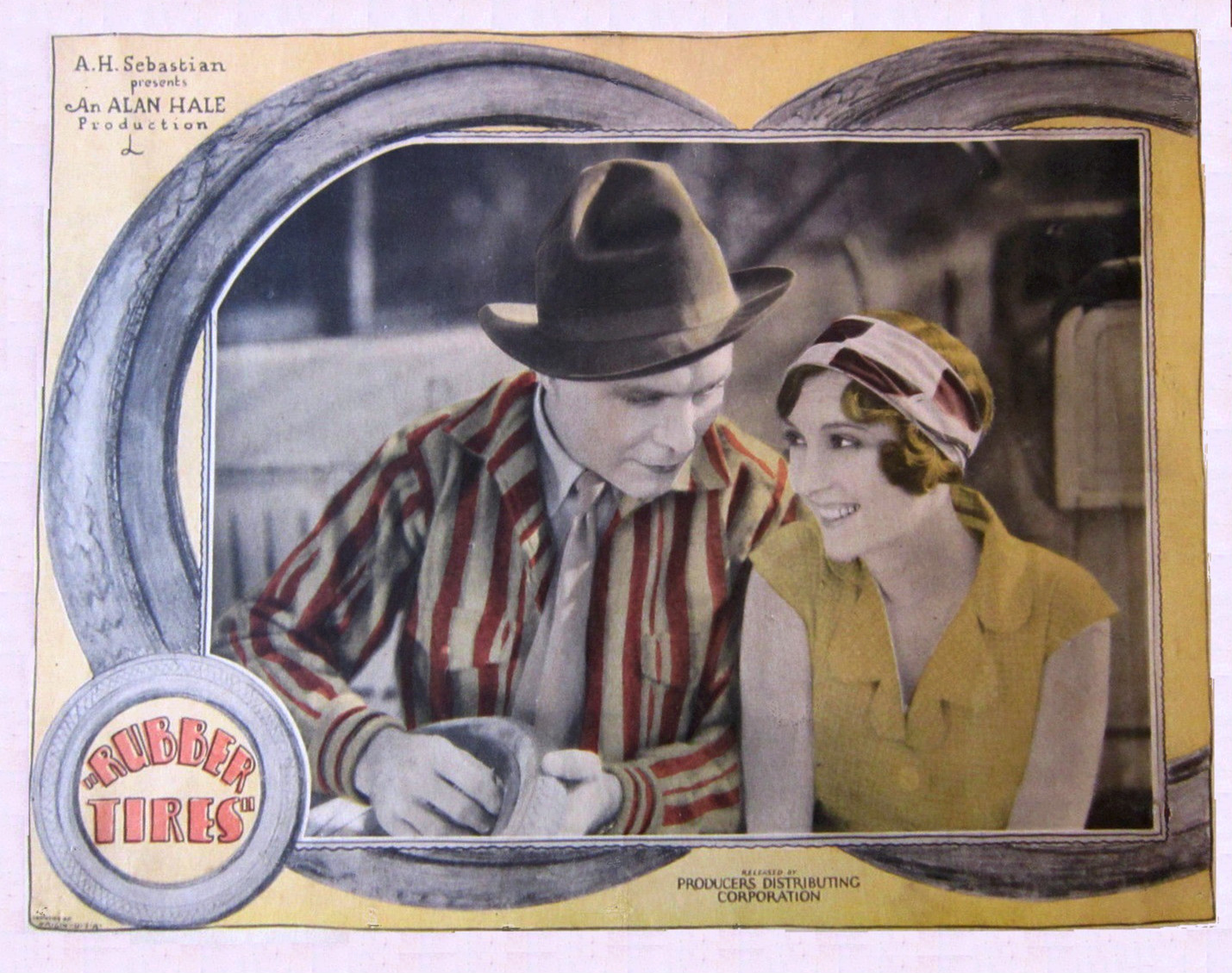
- Lobby card
- Directed by: Alan Hale, Sr.
- Screenplay by: Tay Garnett; Zelda Sears
- Story by: Frank Condon
- Produced by: John C. Flinn
- Starring: Bessie Love; Harrison Ford
- Cinematography: Robert Newhard
- Production company: DeMille Pictures
- Distributed by: Producers Distributing Corporation
- Release date: February 7, 1927 (U.S.)
- Running time: 7 reels; 6,303 feet
- Country: United States
- Language: Silent (English intertitles)

Rubber Tires (called Ten Thousand Reward in the UK) is a 1927 American silent film comedy adventure directed by Alan Hale, Sr. and produced by Cecil B. DeMille through his DeMille Pictures Corporation. The film was distributed by PDC (Producers Distributing Corporation). It stars Bessie Love, May Robson, and Harrison Ford.

The film survives in 16 mm format and has been released on home video. The film is also in the public domain and is preserved in the Internet Archive.

== Production ==
The movie was filmed at DeMille Studios in Culver City, California.

== Plot ==
Rubber Tires (1927) in full

The Stack family of New York City has fallen on difficult financial times. Pa Stack squandered the family's money by buying a home in Newhall, California, hoping that there would be oil on the land. Taxes are now due on the California home, which is scheduled to be sold to cover taxes. When breadwinner Mary Ellen Stack loses her job, the family decides to pay the taxes and live in their California home. They sell their furniture and use the money to buy a Tourist brand car, complete with rubber tires.

Before they leave, Pa tells Bill James, a former boyfriend of Mary Ellen, that they are moving to California, and Bill decides to follow them in his own car. When one of the family's car's tires goes flat, Bill catches up with the family and helps them. Along the way, the family picks up a handsome actor who is trying to come to California to further his career.

The Tourist Motor Car Company wants to use the first Tourist brand car ever made in an ad campaign, and launches a search to find it, complete with a $10,000 reward. The man who sold the car to the Stack family learns of the reward, tracks down the Stacks, and offers them $200 for it. Mary Ellen refuses the offer, but the salesman continues to negotiate with her. Unbeknownst to her, Pa sells the car to a Mexican couple for $500. He returns to the family just as the salesman has raised the offer to $750. When the salesman hears that the car has been sold, he tells the family of the full reward, and pursues the new owners.

While driving through the west, the family is held up by bandits who rob them and let the air out of their tires. Bill comes to the rescue, and lends them his car while he fixes theirs. He is able reacquire the Tourist car and drives it to Newhall. When he approaches the family, the brakes fail, and, unable to stop the car, he drives past them.

When the car finally slows down, the actor accuses Bill of trying to steal the Tourist car. The two men fight while the family regains the car and drives off. Bill realizes that they are in danger, and follows after them to warn them. The Stack family drives off the road into a fence, and all are fine. They are at their home.

== Cast ==
- Bessie Love as Mary Ellen Stack
- Erwin Connelly as Pa Stack
- Junior Coghlan as Charley Stack
- May Robson as Mrs. Stack
- Harrison Ford as Bill James
- John Patrick as Dudley Blake
- Clarence Burton as Mexican

== Reception ==
The film received mixed reviews, and Bessie Love was deemed "cute".
