= The Trap (1922 film) =

1922 film by Robert Thornby

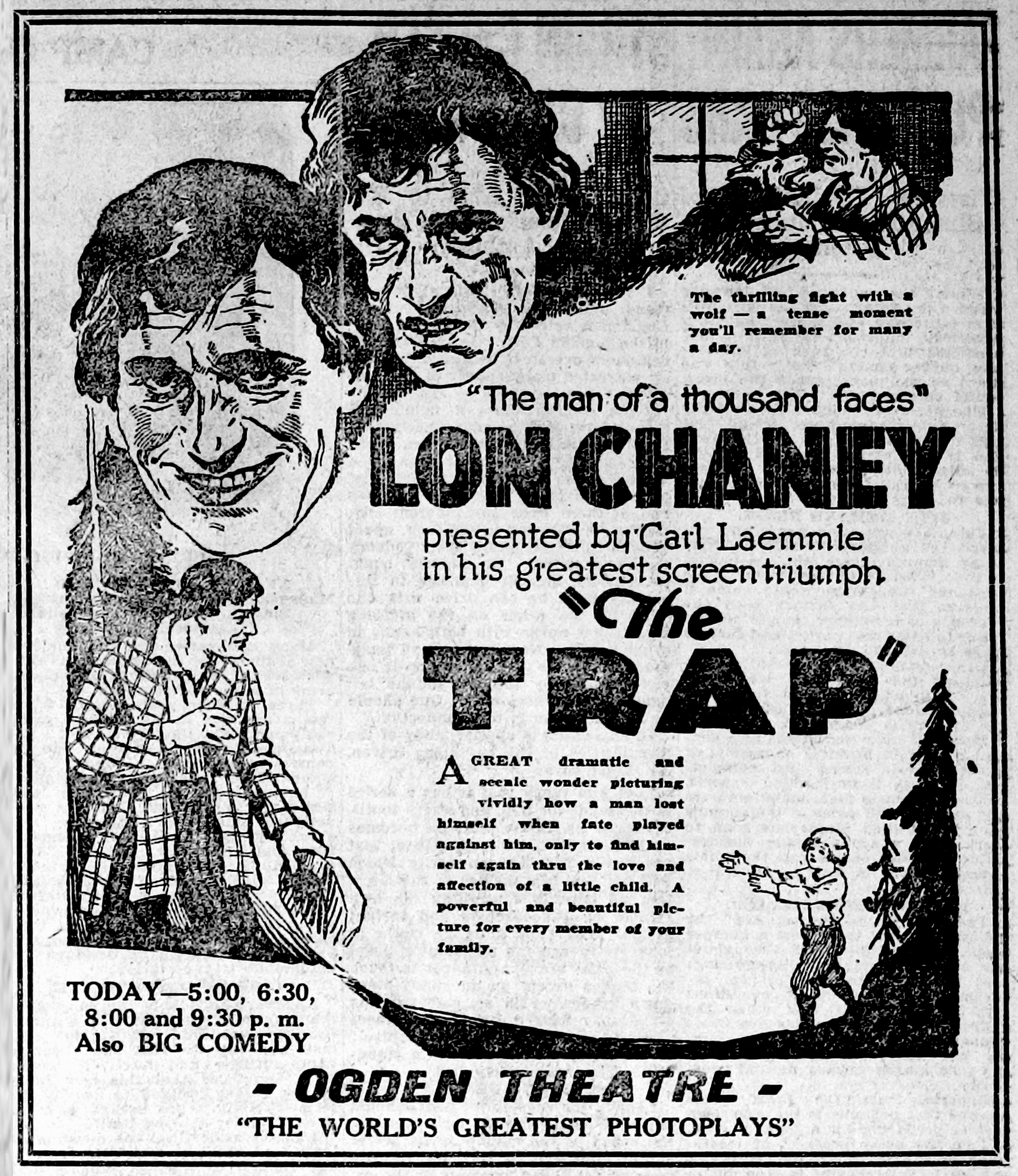
- Newspaper advertisement.
- Directed by: Robert Thornby
- Written by: George C. Hull (screenwriter); Lon Chaney (story); Lucien Hubbard (story); Irving Thalberg (story)
- Starring: Lon Chaney; Alan Hale
- Cinematography: Virgil Miller
- Distributed by: Universal Pictures
- Release date: May 9, 1922 (U.S.)
- Running time: 61 minutes
- Country: United States
- Languages: Silent; English intertitles

The Trap is a 1922 American silent Western film directed by Robert Thornby and starring Lon Chaney and Alan Hale. It was released by Universal Pictures. The film was released in the United Kingdom under the title Heart of a Wolf (some sources still list the film under that title). One working title for the film was Wolfbreed. The film was re-released in the U.S. in 1926.

The screenplay was written by George C. Hull, based on a story idea that was co-written by Lon Chaney. A lobby card exists from the film, as well as a photo of Chaney as Gaspard. The film was finished in September 1921, but was only released on May 9, 1922, in New York City.

The film stars Chaney as the leading character, Alan Hale as his rival, and Irene Rich as the female lead. Chaney had also appeared in an unrelated film of the same name in 1913. The film also features (in a very minor role) Chaney's real-life son Creighton (later known as Lon Chaney Jr.) in his film debut. Junior plays one of the little children who flock around behind Gaspard in the very first scene of the film.

Critic Jon C. Mirsalis commented "Seen today, THE TRAP is a dismal entry in Chaney's career. The dialogue titles are done in a phony French accent (e.g., "An dat leetle papaire tak' w'at was my fathaire's?"), and the overly melodramatic story probably seemed dated even in 1922. Chaney would soon go on to much better productions. This was his last work for Universal until THE HUNCHBACK OF NOTRE DAME."

== Plot ==
The Trap (1922)

Gaspard, a French fur trapper, returns from a trip to find his sweetheart Thalie romantically involved with a newcomer named Benson. Gaspard then learns that Benson has also acquired ownership of Gaspard's mine through a legal technicality. Broken in health and spirit, Gaspard swears vengeance but bides his time.

Benson marries Thalie and, after seven years, she becomes ill and dies, leaving behind a son. Offscreen, Benson loses the mine he stole in a cave-in, and becomes an alcoholic. But this is not enough revenge for Gaspard. He urges the town bully to start a fight with Benson, and Benson ends up shooting and injuring the ruffian in self defense. Gaspard testifies against Benson at his trial and causes the unfortunate wretch to be incarcerated. He then taunts him through the prison bars with having caused the mine cave-in that ruined him.

Gaspard takes Benson's son to his cabin, intending to treat the boy badly as part of his revenge on his parents. But the child revives the sweet nature he had before his wrongs, and he comes to love him. He takes him to the school, where a pretty young woman teacher welcomes them both. However, he still wants revenge, and when Benson is released from prison Gaspard arranges a trap in his cabin to kill him when he comes to reclaim his son. Gaspard catches a fierce wolf, starves it in a cage against his cabin wall, and builds a mechanism that will let the wolf into the cabin and lock the door from the outside when Benson enters it.

But the little boy walks into the trap instead, and Gaspard sees this and is horrified. He rushes in and wrestles the wolf into submission with his bare hands in the near-dark; he is gravely wounded, but saves the boy. When Benson arrives, Gaspard gives him the child and wishes them both Godspeed. Benson is touched, and they shake hands. As the father and son leave, the pretty teacher offers to teach Gaspard to read and write so the child will be proud of him when they next meet.

== Cast ==
- Lon Chaney as Gaspard the Good
- Alan Hale as Benson
- Dagmar Godowsky as Thalie
- Stanley Goethals as The Boy
- Irene Rich as The Teacher
- Dick Sutherland as The Town Bully
- Spottiswoode Aitken as The Factor
- Herbert Standing as The Priest
- Frank Campeau as The Police Sergeant
- Lon Chaney Jr. as little boy in crowd scene (uncredited)

== Production ==
The Trap was filmed in Yosemite National Park in California. This was the first Chaney film to use the panchromatic film stock, which became popular in the late 1920s.

The film's tagline was "A GREAT dramatic and scenic wonder picturing vividly how a man lost himself when fate played against him, only to find himself again through the love and affection of a little child. A powerful and beautiful picture for every member of your family!"

== Survival status ==
A 4K restoration was done by Universal Pictures from 16mm and 35mm elements in 2023. Several prints of The Trap still exist, and the film is available on DVD and Blu-ray.

== Critical Comments ==
"The Trap registers 100 percent. Lon Chaney's splendid dramatic talents were never demonstrated to better effect than in his portrayal of the simple-minded, joyous Gaspard, whose all-embracing love of mankind is temporarily turned to hate by the cruel strokes of Fate. His performance is a keen, incisive study in contrasts, which grip one with unfailing power and adds fresh lustre to his already brilliant reputation."--- Exhibitors Trade Review

"The plot is a conventional one. The reasons for the film's success are two: first, the splendid direction and secondly, the acting of Lon Chaney. There are a few too many close-ups of him however." ---Film Daily

"Mr. Chaney in this film awakens sympathy, although at times he makes the spectator hate him for what he contemplates. It should give excellent satisfaction to those who enjoy strong melodramas." ---Harrison's Reports

"Too much of the star in closeups every few feet makes this feature a very draggy affair...The picture gives Chaney a chance to hog footage right along in (too many) close-ups. This becomes rather tiresome, as all the emoting he does not carry the story forward at all." ---Variety

"A fair offering, but not what is to be expected from a Universal Jewel. Mr. Chaney does some great acting, however.... Without the masterful performance by Lon Chaney, THE TRAP would hardly be able to lift itself out of the slough of triteness. An excellent picture of French-Canadian life. The scenery is great. Only fault the picture has, if any, is too many lengthy close-ups of Lon Chaney. They overdo Chaney's excellent character work." ---Moving Picture World
