= Man-Made Women =

1928 film

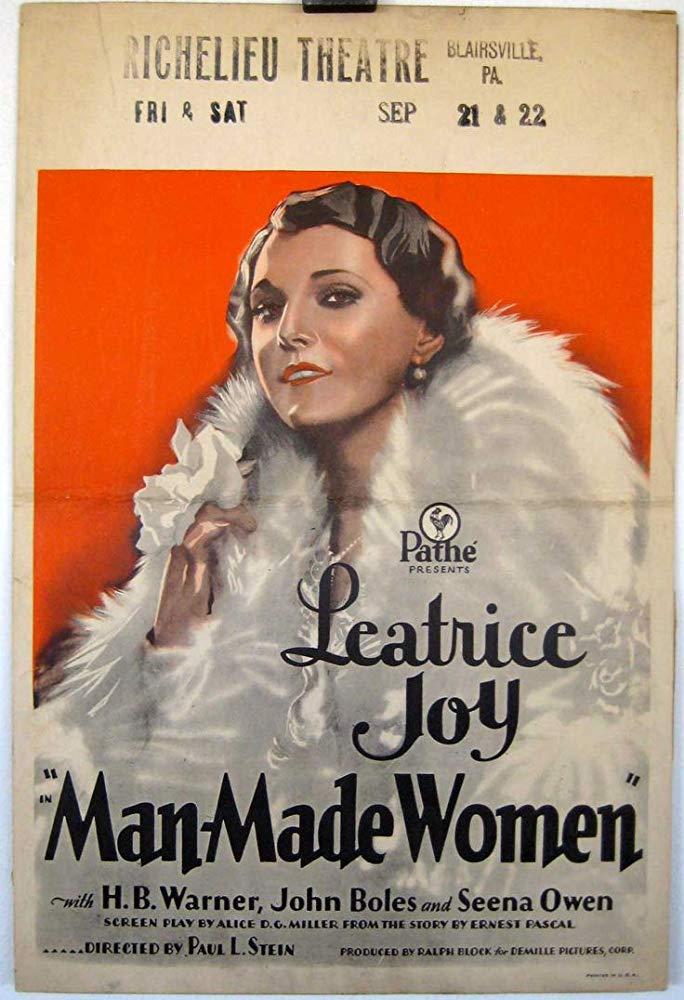
- Directed by: Paul L. Stein
- Written by: Alice D. G. Miller (writer); Edwin Justus Mayer (titles)
- Story by: Ernest Pascal
- Produced by: Ralph Block
- Starring: Leatrice Joy
- Cinematography: John J. Mescall
- Edited by: Doane Harrison
- Production company: DeMille Pictures Corporation
- Distributed by: Pathé Exchange
- Release date: September 9, 1928
- Running time: 6 reels
- Country: United States
- Language: Silent (English intertitles)

Man-Made Women is a 1928 American silent comedy-drama film directed by Paul L. Stein and starring Leatrice Joy. It was produced by Cecil B. DeMille and Ralph Block and distributed through Pathé Exchange.

== Cast ==
- Leatrice Joy as Nan Payson
- H. B. Warner as Jules Moret
- John Boles as John Payson
- Seena Owen as Georgette
- Jay Eaton as Garth
- Jeanette Loff as Marjorie
- Sidney Bracey as Owens

== Preservation ==
The film is preserved at the Library of Congress.
