= Officer O'Brien =

1930 film

- Directed by: Tay Garnett
- Written by: Tom Buckingham
- Produced by: Ralph Block
- Starring: William Boyd; Ernest Torrence; Dorothy Sebastian
- Cinematography: Arthur C. Miller
- Edited by: Jack Ogilvie
- Music by: Josiah Zuro
- Production company: Pathé Exchange
- Distributed by: Pathé Exchange
- Release date: February 15, 1930
- Running time: 72 minutes
- Country: United States
- Language: English

Officer O'Brien is a 1930 American pre-Code comedy crime film directed by Tay Garnett and starring William Boyd, Ernest Torrence and Dorothy Sebastian. The film's sets were designed by the art director Edward C. Jewell. It was one of the last films produced by Pathé Exchange before it was fully merged into RKO Pictures.

== Cast ==
- William Boyd as Bill O'Brien
- Ernest Torrence as John P. O'Brien
- Dorothy Sebastian as Ruth Dale
- Ralf Harolde as Mike Patello
- Paul Hurst as Captain Antrim
- Russell Gleason as Johnny Dale
- Clyde Cook as Limo Lewis
- Arthur Housman as Tony Zurik
- Toyo Fujita as Kono
- Tom Maloney as Detective
- Clarence Wilson as Patello's Attorney

== Bibliography ==
- Munden, Kenneth White. The American Film Institute Catalog of Motion Pictures Produced in the United States, Part 1. University of California Press, 1997.
