= It's a Date =

1940 film by William A. Seiter

- Theatrical release poster
- Directed by: William A. Seiter
- Screenplay by: Norman Krasna
- Story by: Jane Hall; Frederick Kohner; Ralph Block
- Produced by: Joe Pasternak
- Starring: Deanna Durbin; Kay Francis; Walter Pidgeon
- Cinematography: Joseph A. Valentine
- Edited by: Bernard W. Burton
- Music by: Charles Previn (director)
- Production company: Joe Pasternak Productions
- Distributed by: Universal Pictures
- Release date: March 22, 1940 (USA)
- Running time: 104 minutes
- Country: United States
- Language: English
- Budget: $867,000

It's a Date is a 1940 American musical film directed by William A. Seiter and starring Deanna Durbin, Kay Francis, and Walter Pidgeon. Based on a story by Jane Hall, Frederick Kohner, and Ralph Block, the film is about an aspiring actress who is offered the lead in a major new play, but discovers that her mother, a more experienced actress, was hoping to get the same part. Their lives are complicated further when they both get involved with the same man. Distributed by Universal Pictures, It's a Date was remade in 1950 as Nancy Goes to Rio.

== Plot ==
Georgia Drake performs on stage, singing "Gypsy Lullaby"; her daughter, Pamela, watches with her boyfriend Freddie Miller. They have come down from Maine, where they are part of a summer theater. Georgia is a renowned Broadway actress; this is closing night, and she is going to Hawaii for a rest before starting any new play. Her daughter, Pam, also has great acting skills and hopes to follow in her mother's and grandmother's footsteps. At the after-party, Pamela convinces director Sidney Simpson and writer Carl Ober to come up to Maine and see the theater group. After the party ends, Pamela sings "Love is All" while she massages her mother's neck. Claudia's dresser, Sara, who also worked with Georgia's famous mother and is now a member of the family, accompanies her on the piano.

Only the audience knows that Carl came to this country to see Georgia perform, and having seen her he believes that she is too old for the part of 20-year-old St. Anne in his new play. Sidney and Carl go to Maine and decide to try out the second act with the theater group, with Pamela in the role of St. Anne. During the performance, Pamela sings, "Loch Lomond." Pamela's performance is a revelation, and they offer her the role of St. Anne. Pamela is very excited, and promises to work hard, but does not know she is taking over a role that her mother assumes to be hers.

Sidney tells Pamela to go away someplace quiet and learn the script, and without telling him, Pamela travels to Hawaii to ask her mother to coach her. On her journey, pineapple king John Arlen notices her practicing the play. He thinks that she is a troubled girl who just got jilted by her love, and sets out to distract her by posing as a stowaway, with the help of his friend, the ship's captain. Eventually they figure out the truth about each other and become friends. Pamela arrives in Honolulu, only to find that her mother is not resting, but is preparing herself rigorously to play the lead in St. Anne.

Not wanting to hurt her mother, she decides to give up the role. To keep Georgia from learning the truth, she asks John to take the two of them to dinner in order to avoid an 8 p.m. phone call from Sidney. Pam ducks back to the house to take the call, and Sidney tells her that he and Ober will be there in a week. She is overheard by Sara, who promises not to tell Georgia. However, Sara does prompt Georgia to consider quitting for a season. Pamela, John and Georgia go out to many dinners and spend time together. Pamela convinces herself that she will quit acting completely and marry John.

Meanwhile, John has fallen in love with Georgia. At the Governor's Luau, he tries to avoid Pamela. He knows her intentions and wants to propose to Georgia before Pamela gets the chance to propose to him. He gets Pamela to sing "Quando me n'vo - When I go along," from "La bohème". After she finishes the song, while the crowd mills around her, John takes Georgia outside and proposes and she accepts. Sidney and Ober walk into the ballroom and she tells them that she will not perform St. Anne: She wants “a few years of a real honeymoon.” She suggests that Pam play it. Pamela is angry at first, at the news of the engagement, but she was not really in love with John. Cut to the theater to the last act of St. Anne, set in a church. Pamela, dressed in her nun's habit, sings Schubert's "Ave Maria", while John and Georgia, Sara and Freddie, Sidney and a beaming Ober—watch, entranced.

== Cast ==
- Deanna Durbin as Pamela Drake
- Kay Francis as Georgia Drake
- Walter Pidgeon as John Arlen
- Eugene Pallette as Gov. Allen
- Henry Stephenson as Capt. Andrew
- Cecilia Loftus as Sara Frankenstein
- Samuel S. Hinds as Sidney Simpson
- Lewis Howard as Fred 'Freddie' Miller
- S.Z. Sakall as Karl Ober
- Fritz Feld as Oscar
- Virginia Brissac as Miss Holden, Summer Stock Teacher
- Romaine Callender as Mr. Evans, Summer Stock Teacher
- Joe King as First Mate Dan Kelly
- Mary Kelley as Lil Alden, Governor's Wife
- Eddie Polo as Quartermaster
- Harry Owens and His Royal Hawaiians as Group Performers
- Harry Owens as himself, Leader of Harry Owens and His Royal Hawaiians

== Production ==
Joseph Anthony and Jane Hall did an early draft. Universal signed Norman Krasna to write the script in September 1939. Durbin was meant to tour Europe and give a Royal Command performance in September but this was cancelled due to the war and she started production on this film instead.

The film was shot in 54 days. Director William Seiter was borrowed from Fox.
