= Timber Tramps =

1975 film by Tay Garnett

- Directed by: Tay Garnett
- Starring: Claude Akins; Leon Ames; Eve Brent
- Music by: Hoyt Curtin
- Release date: December 31, 1975
- Running time: 98 minutes
- Country: United States
- Language: English

Timber Tramps is a 1975 film directed by Tay Garnett and starring Claude Akins and Leon Ames.

It was the final film by Garnett.

== Cast ==
- Claude Akins as Matt
- Leon Ames as Deacon
- Eve Brent as Corey
- Joseph Cotten as Greedy sawmill mogul
- Cesar Romero as Greedy sawmill mogul
- Patricia Medina

== See also ==
- List of American films of 1975
