= Tay Garnett =

American film director and writer (1894–1977)

- Born: William Taylor Garnett; June 13, 1894; Los Angeles, California, U.S.
- Died: October 3, 1977 (aged 83); Sawtelle, Los Angeles, California, U.S.
- Education: Massachusetts Institute of Technology
- Occupations: Film director; writer
- Years active: 1920–1975
- Spouses: Patsy Ruth Miller (m. 1929; div. 1933); Helga Moray (m. 1934; div. 1942); Mari Aldon (m. 1953)
- Children: 2

William Taylor "Tay" Garnett (June 13, 1894 – October 3, 1977) was an American film director, writer, and producer. He made nearly 50 films in various genres during his 55-year career, The Postman Always Rings Twice and China Seas being two of the most commercially successful. In his later years, he focused mainly on television.

== Early life ==
Born and raised in Los Angeles, Garnett graduated from Los Angeles High School. He studied commercial art at the Massachusetts Institute of Technology before returning to California to open an advertising agency. In 1917, he joined the U.S. Navy's Aviation Corps and trained soldiers to fly at California bases during World War I.

== Career ==
=== Early career ===
After the war, Garnett entered the film industry as a gagwriter, primarily for Mack Sennett and Hal Roach, but also for Fatty Arbuckle, Mabel Normand, and Chester Conklin. For Roach, Garnett wrote Don't Park There (1924); for Billy Bevan, Galloping Bungalows (1924); and for Sennett, Off His Trolley (1924) and The Plumber (1924). He co-wrote Broken Chains (1922) for Sam Goldwyn; The Hottentot (1922) for Thomas Ince; and That's My Baby (1926) for William Beaudine.

Garnett directed some shorts, such as Fast Black (1924), Riders of the Kitchen Range (1925), and All Wool (1925), and wrote the comedy shorts Honeymoon Hardships (1925), Hold Tight (1925), Three Wise Goofs (1925), No Sleep on the Deep (1925), Salute (1925), On the Links (1925), Who's Your Friend (1925), The Funnymooners (1926), Puppy Lovetime (1926), Smith's Visitor (1926), and A Beauty Parlor (1926). With Stan Laurel (in his pre-Laurel and Hardy days), he made the films A Mandarin Mixup (1924), Detained (1924), and West of Hot Dog (1924). They co-wrote Somewhere in Wrong (1925), Twins (1925), Pie-Eyed (1925), The Snow Hawk (1925), Navy Blue Days (1925), The Sleuth (1925), and Dr. Pyckle and Mr. Pryde (1925).

He adapted a 1919 play for Up in Mabel's Room (1926), which starred Marie Prevost, and co-wrote Frank Capra's The Strong Man (1926) and Edward Sedgwick's There You Are! (1926). For Cecil B. De Mille, he wrote The Cruise of the Jasper B (1926), Rubber Tires (1927), The Wise Wife (1927), Turkish Delight (1927), and Skyscraper (1928). In 1927, he also wrote Getting Gertie's Garter, Long Pants, White Gold, and No Control. Garnett joined Pathé around 1927 and wrote The Cop and Power in 1928.

=== Directing ===
Garnett directed and wrote Celebrity (1928), his first feature as director; The Spieler (1928), The Flying Fool (1929), Bad Company (1931), and Prestige (1931). Pathé merged with RKO in 1928; under the new name, Garnett directed Oh, Yeah! (1929), Her Man (1930) starring Helen Twelvetrees, Officer O'Brien (1930), and Panama Flo (1932). With Universal Studios, Garnett worked on The Penalty of Fame (1932), S.O.S. Iceberg (1933), and Destination Unknown (1933). With Paramount Studios, he directed the successful One Way Passage (1932). Garnett enjoyed further success in 1935 after moving to MGM and directing China Seas (1935). With Columbia Studios, he made She Couldn't Take It (1935).

In 1935, Garnett announced the creation of his own production company and subsequently left on a year-long cruise on his yacht. The Athene carried a small number of people, including Garnett's friends Polly Ann Young and Regis Toomey, and his wife Helga. During his trip, he shot footage of the outdoors for his future productions. He returned to Hollywood in October 1936 and signed with 20th Century Fox, where he made Professional Soldier (1936), Love Is News (1937), and Slave Ship (1937). He also worked on Stand-In (1937) for Walter Wanger.

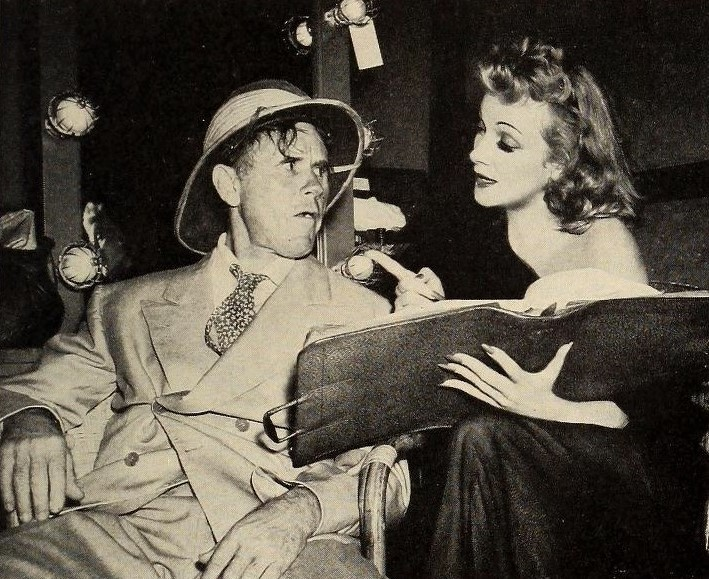
Tay Garnett and Marlene Dietrich on the set of Seven Sinners (1940)

Garnett's first film as a producer as well as a director was Joy of Living (1938) at RKO. He continued working with Wanger, producing and directing three of his films in the late 1930s: Trade Winds (1938), Eternally Yours (1939), and Slightly Honorable (1939). He provided a story for Columbia Studios' Cafe Hostess (1940) and directed Universal's Seven Sinners (1940), which starred Marlene Dietrich and John Wayne. He produced but not direct RKO's Unexpected Uncle (1941) and Weekend for Three (1941), and directed their 1942 film My Favorite Spy. He also directed United Artists' Cheers for Miss Bishop (1941) and Columbia's The Boy from Stalingrad (1942).

At MGM, Garnett directed The Cross of Lorraine (1943) and Bataan (1943), followed by Since You Went Away (1944) and See Here, Private Hargrove (1944). He had some big hits with two Greer Garson films, Mrs. Parkington (1944) and The Valley of Decision (1945), then made his best-known film The Postman Always Rings Twice (1946), starring John Garfield and Lana Turner. At Paramount, he made Wild Harvest (1947); A Connecticut Yankee in King Arthur's Court (1949), which starred Bing Crosby and Rhonda Fleming; and the Mickey Rooney film The Fireball (1950), which he also co-wrote. He went back to MGM to direct one of Loretta Young's last theatrical films, Cause for Alarm!, in 1951, and the adventure film Soldiers Three (1951). For RKO, then under the ownership of Howard Hughes, Garnett directed The Racket (1951) and One Minute to Zero (1952). Garnett travelled to England and Spain to make The Black Knight (1954), then worked on the documentary Seven Wonders of the World (1956). In 1960, he directed A Terrible Beauty in Ireland. He directed a feature, Guns of Wyoming (1963), with Robert Taylor. Garnett wrote, produced and directed The Delta Factor (1970). His last two films were Challenge to Be Free (1975) and Timber Tramps (1975).

=== Television ===
Garnett started directing television shows in the late 1950s with He began working in TV with Four Star Theatre and Main Street to Broadway (1953). When he returned from the UK, he increasingly focused on television, directing such shows as Screen Directors Playhouse, which he also co-wrote, Alcoa Theatre, Goodyear Theatre, Overland Trail, The Loretta Young Show, and The Untouchables. Other shows he worked on included The Deputy, Whispering Smith, 87th Precinct, The Tall Man, Please Don't Eat the Daisies, The Beachcomber, The Loner, The Legend of Jesse James, and Riverboat, He also directed Wagon Train, Naked City, Death Valley Days, Rawhide, Bonanza, Laramie, Frontier Circus, and Gunsmoke.

=== Other work ===
While he primarily worked on films and television, Garnett occasionally worked in other areas of the art world. In 1930, he wrote a stage play called All That Glitters with Zelda Sears. In 1942, he created the NBC Red comedy-detective radio program Three Sheets to the Wind (1942), which starred John Wayne as Dan O'Brien, an American private eye posing as a drunk on a luxury liner sailing from England in 1939, and Helga Moray, which ran for six months at 11:30pm Sunday nights. The show was intended by Garnett to be the pilot for a film, though the film was never made. A demonstration episode of the radio show with Brian Donlevy in the leading role exists. Wayne, not Donlevy, played the role throughout the series run on NBC. He published his autobiography, Light Your Torches and Pull Up Your Tights, in 1973 and was writing a textbook at the time of his death. During his career, he also did some government films.

His star on the Hollywood Walk of Fame was unveiled in February 1960.

== Personal life ==
Garnett married three actresses. First was Patsy Ruth Miller in Beverly Hills on 8 September 1929. She filed for divorce which was granted 18 September 1933 on grounds of desertion while she was in Vienna, Austria, and Garnett in London, England. While in London, Garnett met British author and actress Helga Moray whom he married on his yacht, the Athene, in November 1934. They had a second ceremony on 31 March 1935 in Yuma, Arizona, USA to safeguard her American citizenship. Their son, William John "Bill" Garnett, was born in January 1942. Six months later, Moray filed for divorce on grounds of cruelty. Garnett then married 24-year-old Mari Aldon in London, England, on 13 August 1953. Their daughter Tiela Aldon Garnett was born in Los Angeles, USA on 25 October 1955.

Garnett died of leukemia at the Wadsworth Veterans Administration Hospital in Sawtelle, Los Angeles, California, at the age of 83. His ashes were scattered on his Paso Robles ranch.

== Selected films ==
Year	Title	Company	Director	Producer	Writer	Refs
1922	Broken Chains	Goldwyn Pictures			X	
1922	The Hottentot	Thomas H. Ince Productions			X	
1926	That's My Baby	Paramount Pictures			X	
1926	Up in Mabel's Room	Christie Film Company			X	
1926	The Strong Man	Harry Langdon Corporation			X	
1926	There You Are!	MGM			X	
1926	The Cruise of the Jasper B	DeMille Pictures Corporation			X	
1927	Rubber Tires	DeMille Pictures Corporation			X	
1927	Getting Gertie's Garter	Producers Distributing Corporation			X	
1927	White Gold	DeMille Pictures Corporation			X	
1927	Long Pants	Harry Langdon Corporation			X	
1927	No Control	Producers Distributing Corporation			X	
1927	The Wise Wife	DeMille Pictures Corporation			X	
1927	Turkish Delight	DeMille Pictures Corporation			X	
1928	Skyscraper	DeMille Pictures Corporation			X	
1928	The Cop	DeMille Pictures Corporation			X	
1928	Power	Pathé			X	
1928	Celebrity	Pathé	X		X	
1928	The Spieler	Ralph Block Productions	X		X	
1929	The Flying Fool	Pathé	X		X	
1929	Oh, Yeah!	Pathé	X			
1930	Officer O'Brien	Pathé	X			
1930	Her Man	Pathé	X			
1931	Bad Company	RKO Pathé Pictures	X		X	
1932	Prestige	RKO Pathé Pictures	X		X	
1932	Panama Flo	RKO Pathé Pictures	X			
1932	Okay, America!	Universal Pictures	X			
1932	One Way Passage	Warner Bros.	X			
1933	Destination Unknown	Universal Pictures	X			
1933	S.O.S. Iceberg	Universal Pictures	X			
1935	China Seas	MGM	X			
1935	She Couldn't Take It	Columbia Pictures	X			
1935	Professional Soldier	20th Century Fox	X			
1937	Love Is News	20th Century Fox	X			
1937	Slave Ship	20th Century Fox	X			
1937	Stand-In	Walter Wanger Productions	X			
1938	Joy of Living	RKO Radio Pictures	X			
1938	Trade Winds	Walter Wanger Productions	X	X	X	
1939	Eternally Yours	Walter Wanger Productions	X	X	X	
1939	Slightly Honorable	Walter Wanger Productions	X	X	X	
1940	Seven Sinners	Universal Pictures	X			
1941	Cheers for Miss Bishop	Richard A. Rowland Productions	X			
1942	My Favorite Spy	RKO Studios	X			
1943	The Boy from Stalingrad	Columbia Pictures	X			
1943	Bataan	MGM	X			
1943	The Cross of Lorraine	MGM	X			
1944	Since You Went Away	Selznick International Pictures/Vanguard Films	X			
1944	Mrs. Parkington	MGM	X			
1945	The Valley of Decision	MGM	X			
1946	The Postman Always Rings Twice	MGM	X			
1947	Wild Harvest	Paramount Studios	X			
1949	A Connecticut Yankee in King Arthur's Court	Paramount Studios	X			
1950	The Fireball	Bert E. Friedlob Productions/Thor Productions	X		X	
1951	Cause for Alarm!	MGM	X			
1951	Soldiers Three	MGM	X			
1951	The Racket	RKO Radio Pictures	X			
1952	One Minute to Zero	RKO Radio Pictures	X			
1953	Main Street to Broadway	Cinema Productions	X			
1954	The Black Knight	Warwick Film Productions	X			
1956	Seven Wonders of the World	Cinerama Productions Corp	X			
1960	A Terrible Beauty	DRM Productions/Raymond Stross Productions	X			
1963	Cattle King	Missouri Productions	X			
1970	The Delta Factor	Medallion Television/Spillane-Fellows Productions Inc.	X	X	X	
1975	Challenge to Be Free	Alaska Pictures	X			
1975	Timber Tramps	Alaska Pictures/Arizona General	X			

== Works ==
- Garnett, Tay; Balling, Fredda Dudley (1973). Light Your Torches and Pull Up Your Tights. New Rochelle, New York: Arlington House. ISBN 978-0-87000-204-5.
- Garnett, Tay (1981). Portraits de Cineastes. Un Siecle de Cinema raconte par 42 metteurs en scene (in French). Paris: 5 Continents-Hatier.
- Garnett, Tay; Slide, Anthony (1996). Directing: Learn from the Masters. Lanham, Maryland: Scarecrow Press. ISBN 9780810830462. OCLC 925180539.
