= Skyscraper (1928 film) =

1928 film

- Lobby card
- Directed by: Howard Higgin
- Written by: Elliott J. Clawson; Tay Garnett (titles); Dudley Murphy (story)
- Produced by: Ralph Block; Cecil B. DeMille (for PDC)
- Starring: William Boyd
- Cinematography: John W. Boyle
- Edited by: Adelaide Cannon
- Production company: DeMille Pictures Corporation
- Distributed by: Pathé Exchange
- Release date: April 8, 1928
- Running time: 68 minutes
- Country: United States
- Language: Silent

Skyscraper is a 1928 American silent drama film directed by Howard Higgin. At the 2nd Academy Awards in 1930, Elliott J. Clawson was nominated for an Academy Award in the category Best Writing (Adapted Screenplay). Prints of the film exist.

== Cast ==
- William Boyd as Blondy
- Alan Hale as Slim Strede
- Sue Carol as Sally
- Alberta Vaughn as Jane
- Wesley Barry as Redhead
- Paul Weigel as Redhead's father

== Development ==
In 1927, Cecil B. DeMille charged Ayn Rand - at the time, recently arrived from the Soviet Union - with writing a script for what would become Skyscraper. The original story, by Dudley Murphy, was about two construction workers involved in building a New York skyscraper who are rivals for a woman's love. Rand rewrote the story, transforming the rivals into architects. One of them, Howard Kane, was an idealist dedicated to his mission and erecting the skyscraper despite enormous obstacles. The film would have ended with Kane's throwing back his head in victory, standing atop the completed skyscraper. DeMille rejected Rand's script, and the completed film followed Murphy's original idea; however, Rand's version contained elements she would later use in The Fountainhead.
