= The Spieler =

1928 film

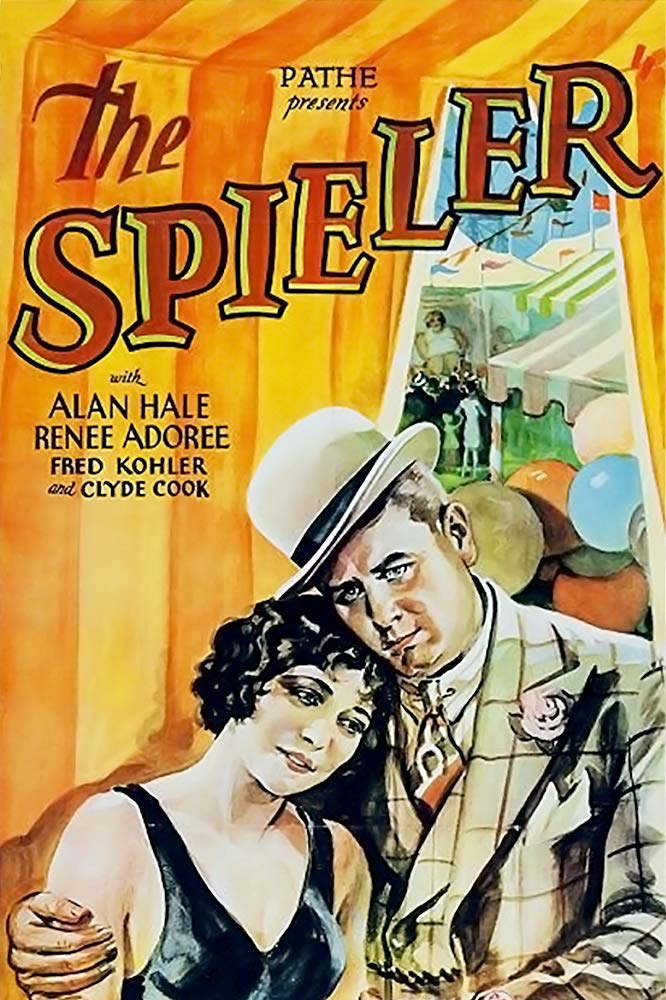
- Directed by: Tay Garnett
- Written by: Hal Conklin; Tay Garnett; John W. Krafft
- Starring: Alan Hale; Clyde Cook; Renée Adorée
- Cinematography: Arthur C. Miller
- Edited by: Doane Harrison
- Music by: Josiah Zuro
- Production company: Ralph Block Productions
- Distributed by: Pathé Exchange
- Release date: December 20, 1928
- Running time: 62 minutes
- Country: United States
- Languages: Sound (Part-Talkie); English intertitles

The Spieler is a 1928 American sound part-talkie drama film directed by Tay Garnett and starring Alan Hale, Clyde Cook, and Renée Adorée. While the film had a few sequences with audible dialog, the majority of the film featured a synchronized musical score with sound effects using both the sound-on-disc and sound-on-film process.

The film's sets were designed by the art director Edward C. Jewell.

== Plot ==
Flash and Luke, also known as "Perfesser" McIntosh, are two fast-talking, light-fingered grifters who have long made their living working the midway of traveling carnivals, fleecing unsuspecting patrons with smooth patter and sleight-of-hand. Their fortunes shift when they learn that Cleo d'Alzelle, a spirited young woman who has just inherited her late father's carnival, is determined to run a clean operation and rid the midway of all crooks and racketeers.

Seeing an opportunity to blend in as reformed men, Flash and Luke arrive at the D’Alzelle carnival shortly after Cleo fires her spieler for stealing a purse. Flash presents himself as the "world’s champion spieler," praising her anti-theft policies and convincing her that he can help enforce them. He’s hired, and Luke takes on the job of tightrope walker.

Soon, Luke witnesses Red Moon, the crooked and brutal concessions boss, murder the disgraced former spieler after the man threatens to expose Red’s graft unless Cleo reinstates him. Luke confides in Flash, who confronts Red, only to realize they once served time together in a Seattle prison. Red reveals he has the town officials in his pocket and that Cleo’s honesty campaign actually creates perfect cover for racketeering.

Flash narrowly avoids suspicion when Cleo nearly catches him lifting a wallet—he convinces her he was merely returning it to its owner. Although she rebuffs his early attempts at flirtation, Flash's genuine admiration for Cleo grows as he watches her manage the carnival with poise, confidence, and grace—including her performances as a high-diver. Their affection deepens into unspoken love, as the two begin sharing suppers after the shows. Luke, however, worries that Cleo discovering their criminal past could shatter everything.

When Cleo fires a crooked operator running a fixed wheel-of-fortune game, the man threatens her, claiming Red is his real boss. Flash steps in to protect her. Cleo confronts Red, who pretends to support her decision, but privately tells Flash that he and his gang plan to rob her safe, bribe the sheriff (already on their payroll), and seize control of the carnival once she’s unable to make payroll. Flash warns Red to back off, but Red suspects Flash’s feelings for Cleo have made him soft.

Red plots to frame Flash for the robbery. When Flash accidentally drops a lighter Cleo gifted him for his birthday, Red plants it at the crime scene. Cleo later catches Flash picking a patron’s pocket. He admits to his dishonest past but pleads for another chance—and gets it. He tells Luke they must both go straight.

But soon afterward, Cleo catches Flash in what seems like another compromising act. Believing he’s betrayed her again, she fires him. Moments later, she discovers her safe has been robbed—and the planted lighter seals her worst fears.

Luke overhears Red and his gang gloating over the theft. Before he can reach Cleo, he is spotted and chased. He climbs his tightrope tower in a desperate escape attempt, but Red, thinking no one sees, fires a gun from the shooting gallery and kills him.

Both Flash and Cleo witness the murder. Flash, grief-stricken, carries Luke’s body into a tent. Mourning his fallen friend, he steels himself and confronts Red. Though Red calls for backup, Flash, burning with vengeance, overpowers the henchmen in a brutal melee. Cleo watches in terror as Flash fights with unstoppable fury. Red’s neck is broken in the brawl, and one of his men—possibly The Baker, The Rabbit, Butch, or even the Bearded Lady—confesses the truth about the robbery and Red’s criminal enterprise.

With the real villain unmasked and her faith in Flash restored, Cleo comforts him in her arms, the two united in love and grief as the carnival moves forward—cleansed of corruption, but not without loss.

== Cast ==
- Alan Hale as Flash
- Clyde Cook as Luke aka 'Perfesser' McIntosh
- Renée Adorée as Cleo d'Alzelle
- Fred Kohler as Red Moon
- Fred Warren as The Baker
- James Quinn as The Rabbit
- Kewpie Morgan as Butch
- Billie Latimer as Bearded Lady
- Alfred Adeline in a bit part (uncredited)
- Ed Brady as One of Red's Men (uncredited)
- Sterling Campbell as Last Pickpocket Victim (uncredited)
- Sidney D'Albrook as One of Red's Men (uncredited)
- Jimmy Dime as One of Red's Men (uncredited)
- Bob Perry as One of Red's Men (uncredited)
- Jack Perry as One of Red's Men (uncredited)
- Frederick Peters as Undetermined Secondary Role (uncredited)

== Music ==
The film featured a theme song entitled "Your Heart Looked Into Mine" which was composed by Raymond Hubbell and John Golden. Josiah Zuro arranged and directed the recording session for the soundtrack.

== See also ==
- List of early sound feature films (1926–1929)

== Bibliography ==
- Munden, Kenneth White. The American Film Institute Catalog of Motion Pictures Produced in the United States, Part 1. University of California Press, 1997.
