= Celebrity (1928 film) =

1928 film

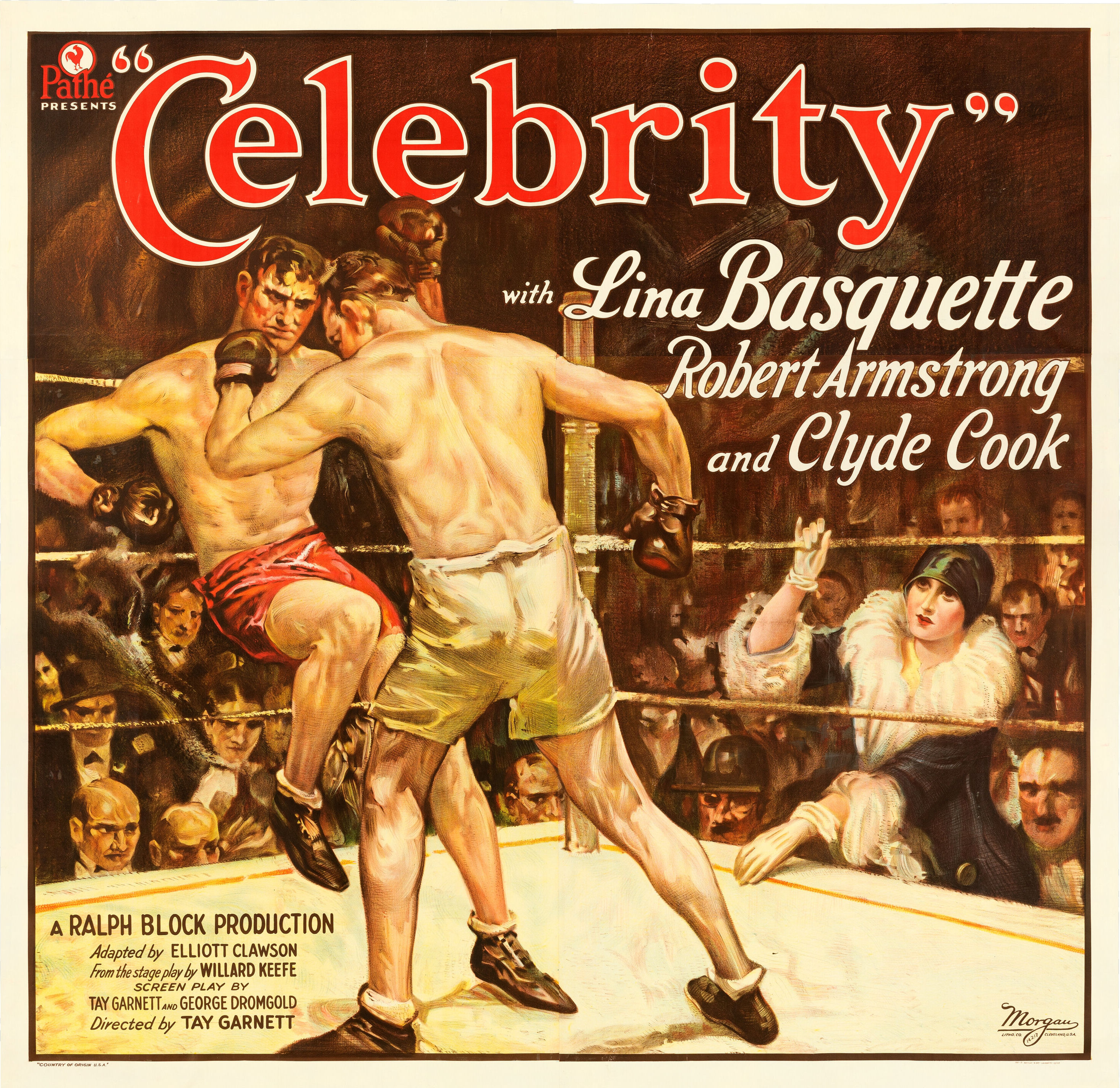
- Directed by: Tay Garnett
- Written by: Willard Keefe (play); Elliott J. Clawson; George Dromgold; John W. Krafft; Tay Garnett
- Produced by: Ralph Block
- Starring: Robert Armstrong; Clyde Cook; Lina Basquette
- Cinematography: J. Peverell Marley
- Edited by: Doane Harrison
- Production company: Pathé Exchange
- Distributed by: Pathé Exchange
- Release date: October 7, 1928
- Running time: 70 minutes
- Country: United States
- Languages: Silent; English intertitles

Celebrity is a 1928 American silent comedy film directed by Tay Garnett and starring Robert Armstrong, Clyde Cook and Lina Basquette.

The film's sets were designed by the art director Mitchell Leisen.

== Cast ==
- Robert Armstrong as Kid Reagan
- Clyde Cook as Circus
- Lina Basquette as Jane
- Dot Farley as Mother
- Jack Perry as Cyclone
- Otto Lederer as Cyclone's Manager
- David Tearle as Reporter

== Bibliography ==
- Munden, Kenneth White. The American Film Institute Catalog of Motion Pictures Produced in the United States, Part 1. University of California Press, 1997.
