= Ralph Block =

American film producer (1889–1974)

Ralph J. Block
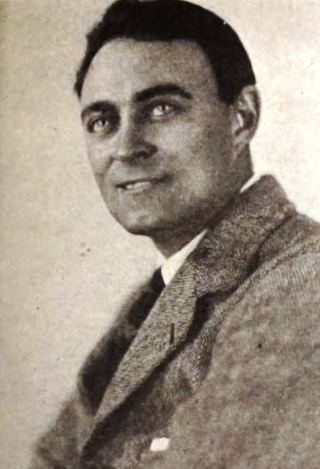
- From a 1920 magazine
- Born: June 21, 1889; Cherokee, Iowa, United States
- Died: January 2, 1974 (aged 84); Wheaton, Maryland, United States
- Education: University of Michigan
- Occupations: Journalist; Film producer/director Screenwriter; Editor; Public official
- Known for: President of Screen Writers Guild (1934–35)
- Spouse: Mary Greenacre
- Children: Bridget Block
- Parent(s): E. S. Block; Doris Chraplewski
- Awards: Honorary Academy Award

Ralph J. Block (June 21, 1889, Cherokee, Iowa – January 2, 1974, Wheaton, Maryland) was an American film producer in the 1920s and became a full-time screenwriter in 1930. He is most famous for being President of the Screen Writers Guild from 1934 to 1935. He received an Honorary Academy Award in 1940 for his dedicated work for the Motion Picture Relief Fund.

== Biography ==
Block was born in the City of Cherokee in the Cherokee County of Iowa to E.S. and Doris Block (née Chraplewski).

== Filmography ==
=== As producer ===
Film
Year	Title	Notes
1926	The Quarterback	Producer
1928	Let 'Er Go Gallegher	Associate producer
1928	Stand and Deliver	Associate producer
1928	The Blue Danube	Associate producer
1928	Skyscraper	Associate producer
1928	The Cop	Producer
1928	Man-Made Women	Producer
1928	Power	Producer
1928	Celebrity	Producer
1928	Show Folks	Producer
1929	High Voltage	Associate producer
1929	Big News	Producer
1929	The Racketeer	Producer
1929	Rich People	Associate producer
1929	This Thing Called Love	Associate producer
1929	His First Command	Associate producer
1930	Officer O'Brien	Associate producer
1930	Scotland Yard	Producer

=== As Writer ===
Film
Year	Title	Notes
1930	The Arizona Kid	Story and screenplay
1930	The Sea Wolf	
1931	A Holy Terror	Adaptation, in collaboration with Alfred A. Cohn and Myron C. Fagan
1933	Before Dawn	Screenplay (uncredited)
1934	Massacre	Screenplay / story
1934	Dark Hazard	Screenplay
1934	Gambling Lady	Screenplay
1934	I Am a Thief	Story and screenplay
1935	The Right to Live	Screenplay
1935	In Caliente	Story and adaptation
1935	The Melody Lingers On	
1936	Boulder Dam	Screenplay
1936	Nobody's Fool	
1940	It's a Date	Original story
1940	Spy for a Day	Screenplay collaboration with Anatole de Grunwald, Emeric Pressburger, and Hans Wilhelm
1945	Patrick the Great	Story
1950	Nancy Goes to Rio	Movie based on Block's novel
