= The Cowboy and the Lady (1911 film) =

1911 film

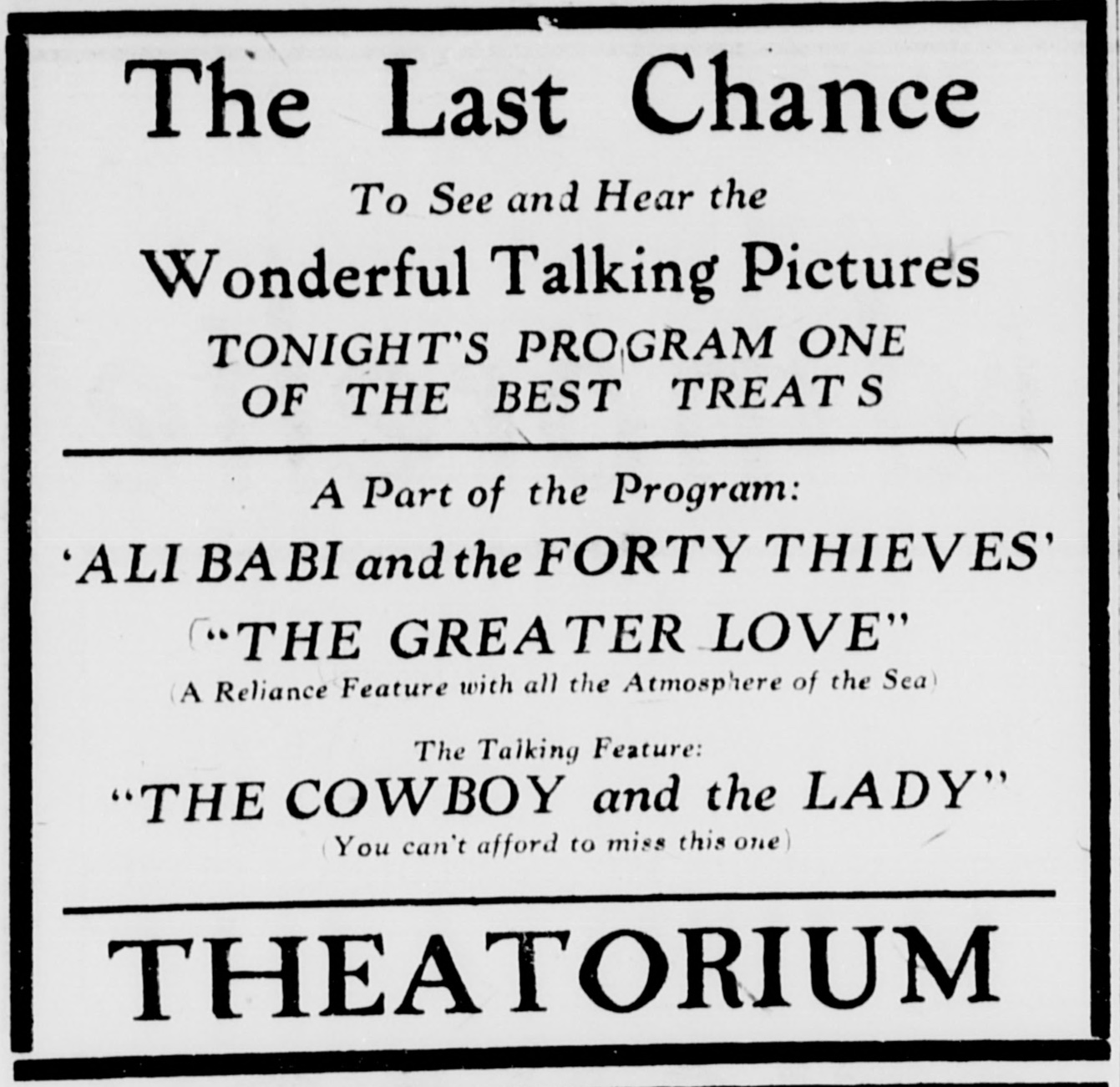
- Contemporary advertisement
- Starring: Alan Hale
- Release date: 1911
- Country: United States
- Languages: Silent; English intertitles

The Cowboy and the Lady is a 1911 American silent Western film notable for being Alan Hale Sr.'s screen debut.
