= The Cop (1928 film) =

1928 film

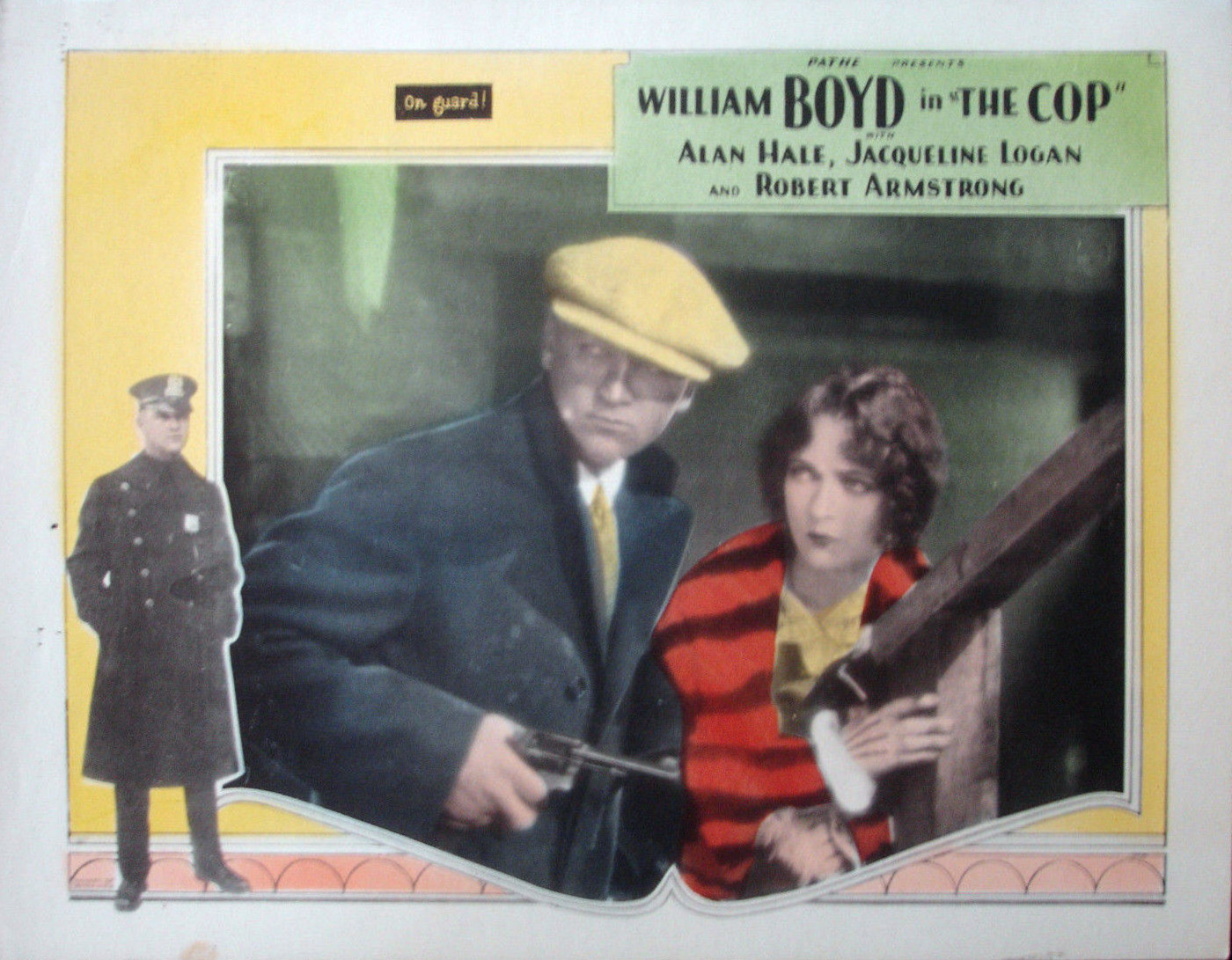
- Lobby card
- Directed by: Donald Crisp
- Written by: Elliott J. Clawson; Tay Garnett; John W. Krafft
- Produced by: Ralph Block
- Starring: William Boyd
- Cinematography: Arthur C. Miller
- Production company: DeMille Pictures Corporation
- Distributed by: Pathé Exchange
- Release date: August 20, 1928
- Running time: 77 minutes
- Country: United States
- Language: Silent (English intertitles)

The Cop is a 1928 American silent drama film directed by Donald Crisp, Due to the public apathy towards silent films, a sound version was also prepared. While the sound version has no audible dialog, it was released with a synchronized musical score with sound effects using both the sound-on-disc and sound-on-film process. At the 2nd Academy Awards in 1930, Elliott J. Clawson was nominated for an Academy Award in the category Best Writing. Prints of the film exist in several film archives including the Library of Congress.

== Cast ==
- William Boyd as Pete Smith
- Alan Hale as Mather
- Jacqueline Logan as Mary Monks
- Robert Armstrong as Scarface Marcas
- Tom Kennedy as Sergeant Coughlin
- Louis Natheaux as Louie
- Philip Sleeman as Lord Courtney (credited as Phil Sleeman)
- Dan Wolheim

== Music ==
The sound version of the film included a theme song entitled “Always The Same, Sweet Pal” which was composed by Charles Weinberg and Billy Stone.
