= Nancy Goes to Rio =

1950 film by Robert Zigler Leonard

- Theatrical release poster
- Directed by: Robert Z. Leonard
- Screenplay by: Sidney Sheldon
- Story by: Jane Hall; Frederick Kohner; Ralph Block
- Produced by: Joe Pasternak
- Starring: Jane Powell; Ann Sothern; Barry Sullivan; Carmen Miranda; Louis Calhern; Scotty Beckett
- Cinematography: Ray June
- Edited by: Adrienne Fazan
- Music by: Original music: Conrad Salinger (uncredited); George Stoll (uncredited); Musical director: George Stoll
- Color process: Technicolor
- Production company: Metro-Goldwyn-Mayer
- Distributed by: Loew's, Inc.
- Release date: March 10, 1950
- Running time: 100 minutes
- Country: United States
- Language: English
- Budget: $1.7 million
- Box office: $2.9 million

Nancy Goes to Rio is a 1950 American Technicolor musical-comedy film directed by Robert Z. Leonard and produced by Joe Pasternak from a screenplay by Sidney Sheldon, based on a story by Jane Hall, Frederick Kohner, and Ralph Block. The music was directed and supervised by George Stoll and includes compositions by George and Ira Gershwin, Giacomo Puccini, Jack Norworth, and Stoll.

The film stars Jane Powell, Ann Sothern, Barry Sullivan, Carmen Miranda, Louis Calhern, and Scotty Beckett.

== Plot ==
On the closing night of a Broadway play, leading actress Frances Elliott hosts a party attended by many guests, including her eccentric father Gregory, who is also an actor; her seventeen-year-old daughter, Nancy Barklay, an aspiring actress; and Brazilian playwright Ricardo Domingos, who is considering starring Frances in his next play.

Frances eagerly pursues the part in Ricardo's play, and though she is virtually assured of the role, Ricardo asks her not publicize the news until a final decision is made. Later, Ricardo privately tells Frances' producer that Frances may not be right for the part and that he had a younger actress in mind. Then, when Ricardo meets Nancy, he instantly knows that he has found the perfect young woman for the role.

The next day, Frances sets sail for Rio de Janeiro, where she intends to vacation and devote herself to studying her lines. Gregory accompanies Frances to Rio, while Nancy, who is about to star in a small stock company play, goes to Connecticut. After observing Nancy's acting abilities, Ricardo offers her the part that he promised Frances. Nancy accepts the role, though she is unaware that Ricardo has already promised it to her mother.

Seeking the quiet she needs to study for the part, Nancy follows her mother and grandfather to Rio. On board the ship, businessman Paul Berten overhears Nancy rehearsing her lines and mistakenly concludes that she is a deserted wife and an expectant mother. Paul takes pity on Nancy and enlists the help of his business partner, Marina Rodrigues, to counsel the young girl.

Nancy does not know that Paul is trying to help her and mistakes his paternal concern for a marriage proposal. She rejects Paul's apparent proposal, and bids him farewell when the ship reaches Rio.

Soon after she is reunited with her mother, Nancy overhears her rehearsing her lines and immediately realizes that they are studying for the same part. The revelation devastates Nancy and prompts her to bow out of the play. She does not tell her mother that she was set to star in Ricardo's play, and instead informs her that she is in an entirely different play.

Confusion abounds when Nancy later visits Paul at his office and tries to accept the marriage proposal she thought he had made. Paul is perplexed by her behavior, and still thinks that Nancy is pregnant and troubled. He sends her home to talk to her mother about her situation, but Nancy misunderstands him and thinks that he meant for her to discuss their impending marriage with her mother.

Marina follows Nancy to her mother's house, and privately tells Frances about Nancy's supposed pregnancy. The confusion is heightened when Frances misunderstands her daughter's anguish and concludes that she must be pregnant by Paul.

Frances demands a private meeting with Paul, during which he reveals his romantic attraction to Frances. Frances leaves Paul in disgust, but the situation is soon clarified when Paul tells Gregory that he had only just met Nancy on the boat. Gregory immediately recognizes Nancy's supposed predicament from the story of the play that Frances was reading, and explains the situation to Frances.

When Frances learns the truth about Paul, she changes her impression of him and they embark on a romance. After announcing her engagement to Paul, Frances withdraws from Ricardo's play and suggests Nancy as her replacement. All ends happily when the show opens in New York with Nancy in the starring role.

== Cast ==
- Ann Sothern as Frances Elliott
- Jane Powell as Nancy Barklay
- Barry Sullivan as Paul Berten
- Carmen Miranda as Marina Lopes Souza Rodrigues
- Louis Calhern as Gregory Elliott
- Scotty Beckett as Scotty Sheridan
- Fortunio Bonanova as Ricardo Domingos
- Glenn Anders as Arthur Barrett
- Nella Walker as Mrs. Harrison
- Hans Conried as Alfredo
- Frank Fontaine as The Mashe
- John Goldsworthy as Butler
- Michael Raffetto as Purser (uncredited)

== Production ==
The working titles of this film were Ambassador to Brazil and His Excellency from Brazil.

The 1940 Universal film It's a Date, produced by Joe Pasternak, directed by William A. Seiter and starring Deanna Durbin and Kay Francis, was also based on Jane Hall, Frederick Kohner and Ralph Block's screen story.

Despite the title and some colorful second-unit footage, the film was mostly filmed on MGM's soundstages. The production makes use of lavish, elegant "New Look" gowns and colorful sets, typical of the top-notch MGM standards.

This was the final film of Ann Sothern's MGM contract; she soon appeared in a series of television sitcoms.

== Musical numbers ==
- "Time and Time Again", music by Fred Spielman, lyrics by Earl Brent
- "Shine On, Harvest Moon", music by Nora Bayes, lyrics by Jack Norworth
- "Magic Is the Moonlight", music and lyrics by María Grever (song "Te quiero dijiste"), English lyrics by Charles Pasquale
- "Nancy's Goin' to Rio", music by Georgie Stoll, lyrics by Earl Brent
- "Cae Cae", music by Roberto Martins, lyrics by Pedro Barrios, English lyrics by John Latouche
- "Yipsee-I-O", music and lyrics by Ray Gilbert
- "Embraceable You", music by George Gershwin, lyrics by Ira Gershwin
- "Baião (Ca-Room' Pa Pa)", written by Humberto Teixeira and Luiz Gonzaga, English lyrics by Ray Gilbert
- "Musetta's Waltz", from the opera La Bohème, music by Giacomo Puccini, libretto by Giuseppe Giacosa and Luigi Illica
- "Love Is Like This", music by Pixinguinha, lyrics by João de Barro (song "Carinhoso"), English lyrics by Ray Gilbert

== Box office ==
According to MGM records the film earned $1,839,000 in the US and Canada and $1,027,000 elsewhere, resulting in a loss of $52,000.

== Critical reception ==
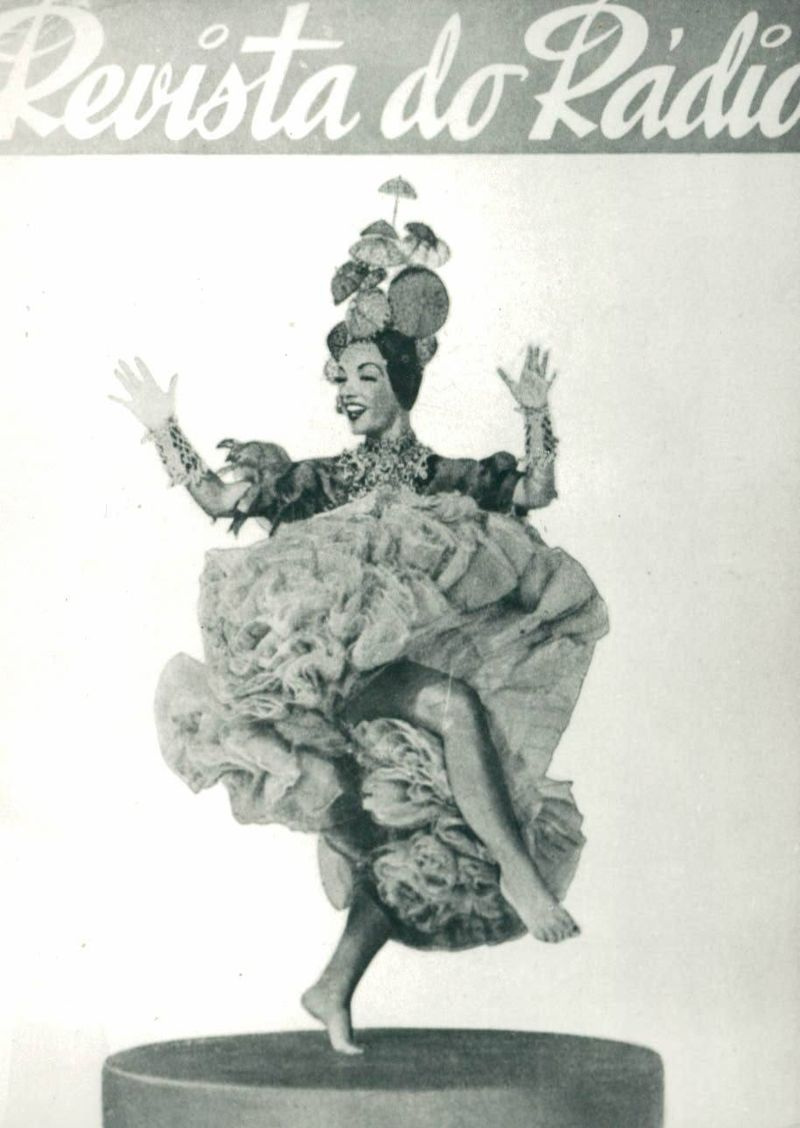
Carmen Miranda on the cover of the Brazilian magazine Revista do Rádio promoting the film.

Bosley Crowther’s review of Nancy Goes to Rio critiques MGM’s attempt to mold Jane Powell into a young star similar to Deanna Durbin, placing her under the production of Joe Pasternak and giving her a script reminiscent of Durbin’s films. Crowther describes the movie as a weak remake of It's a Date (1940). He criticizes the plot as trivial and lacking strength, though he acknowledges a few pleasant songs and charismatic performances, particularly from Powell, Ann Sothern, and Louis Calhern. The film is praised for musical numbers like "Shine On, Harvest Moon", but is seen as dated and lacking substantial depth. Crowther also points out a misunderstanding in the plot that adds forced humor and notes that, while Powell is talented, she falls short of her potential in this type of film.

Variety describes the movie as a light, sparkling musical with all the typical qualities of the genre, creating a vibrant spectacle. Director Robert Z. Leonard is praised for keeping the film's pace dynamic and avoiding heavy moments, ensuring the story remains escapist. The choreography by Nick Castle is also highlighted for adding visual value to the production.

The St. Petersburg Times lauds Nancy Goes to Rio, noting its "cheerful songs, harmonious costumes, abundant laughter, and beautiful landscapes," making it a "thoroughly enjoyable" movie. However, the review mentions that the use of Technicolor did not flatter Ann Sothern, making her appear older, nor did it suit Carmen Miranda, who lost some of her charm. On the other hand, Technicolor was beneficial for Louis Calhern, who was older, and Jane Powell, who looked great on screen.

Dave Kehr of the Chicago Reader considers Nancy Goes to Rio an interesting idea for an MGM musical, with the dynamic of a mother and daughter team of prospectors, but he points out that Robert Z. Leonard’s direction leaves the film lacking in charm. He mentions the cast, which includes Ann Sothern, Jane Powell, Barry Sullivan, Carmen Miranda (whose career was winding down), and Louis Calhern. Kehr also notes that the screenplay by Sidney Sheldon is responsible for the film, which he compares to The Other Side of Midnight (1950), suggesting that it lacks impact.

== Home media ==
The film was released on DVD along with Two Weeks with Love as part of the Classic Musicals from the Dream Factory, Vol. 3. The set also included several other Powell films, such as Hit the Deck and Deep in My Heart. This DVD was re-released on November 28, 2017 under the Warner Archive Collection on DVD.
