= John W. Krafft =

American journalist and screenwriter

John W. Krafft (1888–1958) was an American journalist and screenwriter. He worked for newspapers before becoming a titles writer during the silent film era and then a screenwriter.

He graduated from Manual Training High School in Indianapolis in 1907. He worked at the Indianapolis News and then the Indianapolis Star.

== Filmography ==
- The Angel of Broadway (1927), intertitles
- Stand and Deliver (1928 film)
- The Cop (1928 film), co-writer
- Celebrity (1928 film) co-wrote film adaptation
- Love Over Night (1928), titles
- Strange Cargo (1929 film), co-writer
- A Blonde for a Night (1928), co-writer
- The Spieler (1928), co-writer
- The Blue Danube (1928 film), titles
- Death from a Distance (1935), original story and screenplay
- Men of Action (1935)
- The 13th Man (1937)
- Streamlined Swin (1937), dialogue, an M-G-M musical short directed by Buster Keaton
- Telephone Operator (film) (1937), story
- Here's Flash Casey (1937), screenplay
- Convict's Code (1939), writer
- In Old Cheyenne (1941), original story
- Man from Headquarters (1942), screenwriter
- Foreign Agent (1942), screenwriter
- Deerslayer (1943), adaptation
- Smart Guy (1943), screenwriter
- Tell It to a Star (1945)
