= High School Hero =

High School Hero may refer to:

- High School Hero (1927 film), 1927 film directed by David Butler
- High School Hero (1946 film), 1946 film directed by Arthur Dreifuss
