= Irene Morra =

American film editor

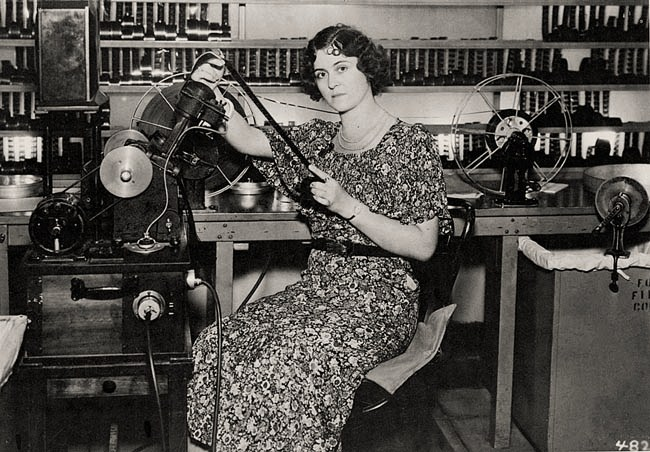
- Born: July 31, 1893; Manhattan, New York, United States
- Died: November 25, 1978 (aged 85); Los Angeles, California, USA
- Occupation: Film editor
- Years active: 1921-1958

Irene Morra (July 31, 1893 – November 25, 1978) was an American film editor who had a 30-year career in Hollywood beginning during the silent era. She cut a number of films by director David Butler.

== Biography ==
Irene was born to Francesco Morra and Louise Pederson; she was of Italian and Swedish ancestry. She and her younger sister, Eleanore, grew up primarily in Manhattan before moving to Los Angeles, where she began working in the film industry right out of high school.

She got a job working as a film editor while still in her teens, first with D.W. Griffith and later at Pathe, First National, MGM, Fox, and Warner Brothers. Eleanore worked as an assistant editor on many of these projects, especially during the 1930s. Irene played a prominent role in establishing the Motion Picture Editors Guild.

She died in 1978 in Los Angeles; she had no known survivors.

== Selected filmography ==
- Hot Girl Car (1958)
- The Cry Baby Killer (1958)
- Teenage Caveman (1958)
- War of the Satellites (1958)
- The Girl He Left Behind (1956)
- Glory (1956)
- Tall Man Riding (1955)
- Jump Into Hell (1955)
- King Richard and the Crusaders (1954)
- The Command (1953)
- Calamity Jane (1953)
- By the Light of the Silvery Moon (1953)
- April in Paris (1952)
- Painting the Clouds with Sunshine (1951)
- Lullaby of Broadway (1951)
- Tea for Two (1950)
- The Daughter of Rosie O'Grady (1950)
- The Story of Seabiscuit (1949)
- It's a Great Feeling (1949)
- Look for the Silver Lining (1949)
- John Loves Mary (1949)
- Two Guys from Texas (1948)
- My Wild Irish Rose (1947)
- The Time, the Place and the Girl (1946)
- Two Guys from Milwaukee (1946)
- San Antonio (1945)
- The Horn Blows at Midnight (1945)
- Shine on Harvest Moon (1944)
- Thank Your Lucky Stars (1943)
- Road to Morocco (1942)
- The Mayor of 44th Street (1942)
- Playmates (1941)
- Caught in the Draft (1941)
- You'll Find Out (1940)
- If I Had My Way (1940)
- That's Right—You're Wrong (1939)
- East Side of Heaven (1939)
- Kentucky (1938)
- Straight Place and Show (1938)
- Kentucky Moonshine (1938)
- Change of Heart (1938)
- Thank You, Mr. Moto (1937)
- Ali Baba Goes to Town (1937)
- Cafe Metropole (1937)
- Love Is News (1937)
- Pigskin Parade (1936)
- White Fang (1936)
- Captain January (1936)
- The Littlest Rebel (1935)
- Here's to Romance (1935)
- Doubting Thomas (1935)
- Bottoms Up (1934)
- My Weakness (1933)
- Hold Me Tight (1933)
- Adorable (1933)
- Cheaters at Play (1932)
- Delicious (1931)
- A Connecticut Yankee (1931)
- Just Imagine (1930)
- Common Clay (1930)
- High Society Blues (1930)
- Harmony at Home (1930)
- Sunnyside Up (1929)
- Prep and Pep (1928)
- Win That Girl (1928)
- News Parade (1928)
- The Phantom of the Forest (1926)
- One of the Bravest (1925)
- The Rag Man (1925)
- Little Robinson Crusoe (1924)
- A Boy of Flanders (1924)
- Circus Days (1923)
- Daddy (1923)
- Oliver Twist (1922)
- Trouble (1922)
- My Boy (1921)
