= John B. L. Goodwin =

American poet

- Born: John Blair Linn Goodwin; 25 February 1912; Manhattan, New York, US
- Died: 12 January 1994 (aged 81)
- Occupations: Author, poet

John Blair Linn Goodwin (25 February 1912 – 12 January 1994) was an American author and poet, best known for his story "The Cocoon" (1946), collected in Houghton Mifflin's The Best American Short Stories in 1947. A further short story was "Stone Still, Stone Cold" (1949).

Goodwin was a native of Manhattan and a world traveler. His other works include a children's book titled Freddy Fribbs (Flea); the 1940 children's book The Pleasant Pirate; the 1952 novel The Idols and the Prey, about Haiti; and the 1963 novella A View from Fuji.

He was known to have had intimate long-term relationships with at least two men and was mentioned multiple times in Christopher Isherwood's diaries. His first known homosexual relationship was with the actor David Rollins (1907–1997), who he was living with as early April 1937, when they listed the same address in New York City when they traveled together to Acapulco, Mexico. Three years later, Rollins is listed as Goodwin's partner in the 1940 census, while they were residing together in Orangetown, NY. At that time, Rollins occupation was cited as a dog fancier at a kennel, and Goodwin was listed as unemployed. In October 1940 they both listed the same Manhattan address in their registration for the draft during World War II. By 1942, they were living together in California, with 1942 and 1944 voter registration records indicating they lived at the same address, with Rollins working as a farmer and Goodwin as a writer. It is unknown when that relationship ended, but Goodwin's 1994 obituary listed Anthony P. Russo as his long-time friend and companion, with no reference to Rollins.

He died on 12 January 1994 at Columbia-Presbyterian Hospital.
