= Jump into Hell =

1955 film by David Butler

- Original film poster
- Directed by: David Butler
- Written by: Irving Wallace
- Produced by: David Weisbart
- Starring: Jack Sernas; Kurt Kasznar; Arnold Moss
- Cinematography: J. Peverell Marley
- Edited by: Irene Morra
- Music by: David Buttolph
- Production company: Warner Bros. Pictures
- Distributed by: Warner Bros. Pictures
- Release date: April 1955
- Running time: 93 minutes
- Country: United States
- Language: English

Jump into Hell is a 1955 war film directed by David Butler. The film stars Jacques Sernas and Kurt Kasznar. As the first Hollywood film based on the war in French Indochina, the story is a fictionalized account of the Battle of Dien Bien Phu.

== Plot ==
In 1954, Dien Bien Phu, a French-controlled fortress in Indochina, is under siege by Viet Minh rebels. Commanding officer De Castries discovers a Red Chinese officer among his Viet Minh prisoners. The general is desperate for new leadership for his men. He radios the French high command at Hanoi for help to send volunteer officers.

At French headquarters in Paris, Captain Guy Bertrand, a former prisoner of war for three years during World War II, volunteers to join. He wants to see action as well as rendezvous with his former love Gisele, who is unhappily married to Bonet, a major at the fort. Also on their way are Captain Callaux, who has been goaded into participating by his nagging, social-climbing wife, Lieutenant Heldman, a former Afrika Korps soldier who is now a legionnaire and the naïve but eager Lieutenant Maupin.

The men parachute down to the area and, with great difficulty, reach the fort. A monsoon rages and the fight drags on for weeks. Heldman heroically staves off enemy soldiers armed with explosives and kills them with a grenade before dying. Bonet attempts to stop the Viet Minh attack by approaching enemy lines under a white flag but is gunned down. Bertrand tries in vain to rescue him.

Low on ammunition, water and other supplies, Callaux, who is despondent after having learned in a letter that his wife has been unfaithful, volunteers to fetch water from a nearby river. He changes his will, leaving his wife nothing, and dispatches it via helicopter. He returns to the fort with the water but dies just as he delivers it.

The situation is hopeless. The enemy is tunneling in and, now without ammunition, the Frenchmen must resort to hand-to-hand combat. In his final act, de Castries orders Bertrand and Maupin to try to escape. De Castries takes a last look around, realizing that the end for him is near.

== Cast ==
- Jacques Sernas as Captain Guy Bertrand (credited as Jack Sernas)
- Kurt Kasznar as Captain Jean Calluox
- Arnold Moss as General Christian De Castries
- Peter van Eyck as Lieutenant Heinrich Heldman
- Marcel Dalio as Sergeant Taite
- Norman Dupont as Lieutenant André Maupin
- Lawrence Dobkin as Major Maurice Bonet
- Patricia Blair as Gisele Bonet (credited as Pat Blake)
- Lisa Janti as Jacqueline (credited as Irene Montwill)
- Alberto Morin as Major Riviere
- Maurice Marsac as Captain Leroy
- Louis Mercier as Captain Darbley
- Peter Bourne as Lieutenant Robert
- Roger Valmy as Major Lamoreaux
- Leon Lontok as Lieutenant Pham
- George Chan as Thai tribesman
- Jacques Scott as Lieutenant De Jean (credited as Jack Scott)
- Harold Dyrenforth as Major Flandrin
- Philip Ahn as Chinese lieutenant (uncredited)
- Gregory Gaye as Lieutenant Colonel Cartier (uncredited)
- Victor Sen Yung as Lieutenant Thatch (uncredited)

== Production ==
Principal photography for Jump into Hell began on September 23, 1954, and lasted until late October. Battle scenes were shot at the Janes Ranch in Conejo, California. Additional battle scenes combined Warner-Pathé newsreel footage of the fall of Dien Bien Phu with live-action scenes.

== Reception ==
In a contemporary review for the Los Angeles Mirror-News, critic Margaret Harford wrote: "At the fort, action picks up considerably, but the script remains the toughest battle of all. It's full of trite touches, labored humor and hardly skims the surface of what this picture might have been."

Reviewer Frank Miller of the Turner Classic Movies website wrote that Jump into Hell is typical of the period in which films exhibited Cold War jingoism: "The spoken prologue compares the Battle of Dienbienphu to fall of the Alamo and the British evacuation at Dunkirk. An early confrontation between French general Arnold Moss and captured Chinese officer Philip Ahn clearly identifies the enemy not as the Viet Minh, but international [c]ommunism. Little is said of the fact that the French defeat, with massive casualties before and after the surrender, helped inspire the nation to withdraw from its former colony. For all its jingoism, the film has its charms, particularly in the performances of an international cast."

Leonard Maltin called Jump into Hell a "[n]eatly paced actioner of paratroopers involved in Indochina war."

== See also ==
- List of American films of 1955
