= Prep and Pep =

1928 American comedy film

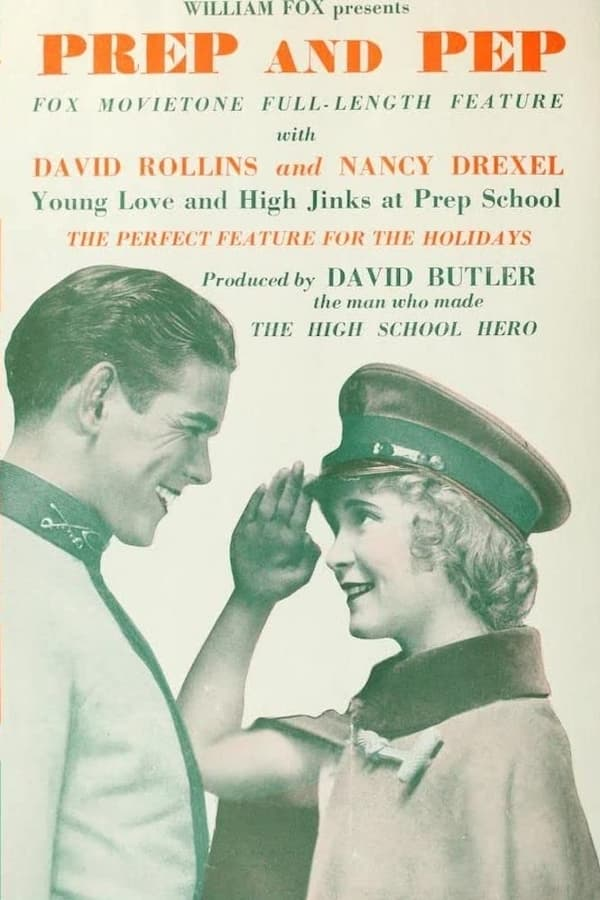
- Advertisement
- Directed by: David Butler
- Screenplay by: John Stone; Malcolm Stuart Boylan
- Story by: John Stone
- Starring: David Rollins; Nancy Drexel; John Darrow; E. H. Calvert; Frank Albertson; Robert Peck
- Cinematography: Joseph Valentine; Sidney Wagner
- Edited by: Irene Morra
- Production company: Fox Film Corporation
- Distributed by: Fox Film Corporation
- Release date: November 18, 1928
- Running time: 59 minutes
- Country: United States
- Languages: Sound (Synchronized) (English Intertitles)

Prep and Pep is a 1928 American synchronized sound comedy film directed by David Butler and written by John Stone and Malcolm Stuart Boylan. While the film has no audible dialog, it was released with a synchronized musical score with sound effects using the sound-on-film movietone process. The film stars David Rollins, Nancy Drexel, John Darrow, E. H. Calvert, Frank Albertson, and Robert Peck. The film was released on November 18, 1928, by Fox Film Corporation.

== Plot ==
Cyril Reade, the polished and well-mannered son of “Tiger” Reade—the greatest athlete the academy ever produced—arrives at a prestigious military prep school. His father’s reputation precedes him, and the cadets expect the newcomer to be a champion like his parent. Flash Wells, the school’s star athlete, quickly grows resentful of the attention Cyril receives and decides to put him in his place.

Cyril soon finds an ally in his roommate, Bunk Hill, the school’s resident prankster, who insists Cyril has untapped physical ability. Hoping to prove it, Bunk arranges a boxing match between Cyril and Flash. The fight goes badly—Cyril is soundly beaten—until a sudden commotion scatters the spectators. Left alone in the ring with the academy’s commandant, Col. Marsh, and the colonel’s spirited daughter Dorothy Marsh, Cyril realizes that being caught boxing could lead to severe punishment. Thinking fast, he pretends to be shadowboxing for exercise, and the ruse spares him any trouble.

Dorothy, amused and charmed by Cyril, invites him to her home that evening. This gesture infuriates Flash, who hatches a plan to humiliate the newcomer. At the school relay race, Flash succeeds in making Cyril—already an awkward runner—the laughingstock of the academy. Cyril feels the weight of constant embarrassment and his father’s legendary shadow, but the headmaster’s stern encouragement convinces him not to quit.

Determined to redeem himself, Cyril begins training seriously under the Coach and earns a place in the elite Black Horse Troop by taming a difficult mount that no one else could handle. His growing confidence sets the stage for a second grudge match with Flash. On the day of the fight, however, the ringing bell is drowned out by cries of alarm—a prairie fire is racing toward the school, with Dorothy trapped in its path.

Cyril and Flash forget their feud and charge into the blaze. Battling smoke and heat, Cyril reaches Dorothy, lifts her onto his horse, and rides her to safety, while Flash aids in the rescue. In the aftermath, the two rivals shake hands, their enmity gone. Both receive medals for heroism, and Cyril earns not only Dorothy’s admiration but also his father’s nickname—“Tiger”—proving that he has truly lived up to the Reade legacy.

== Cast ==
- David Rollins as Cyril Reade
- Nancy Drexel as Dorothy Marsh
- John Darrow as Flash Wells
- E. H. Calvert as Col. Marsh
- Frank Albertson as Bunk Hill
- Robert Peck as Coach

== See also ==
- List of early sound feature films (1926–1929)
