= David Rollins (actor) =

American actor (1907–1997)

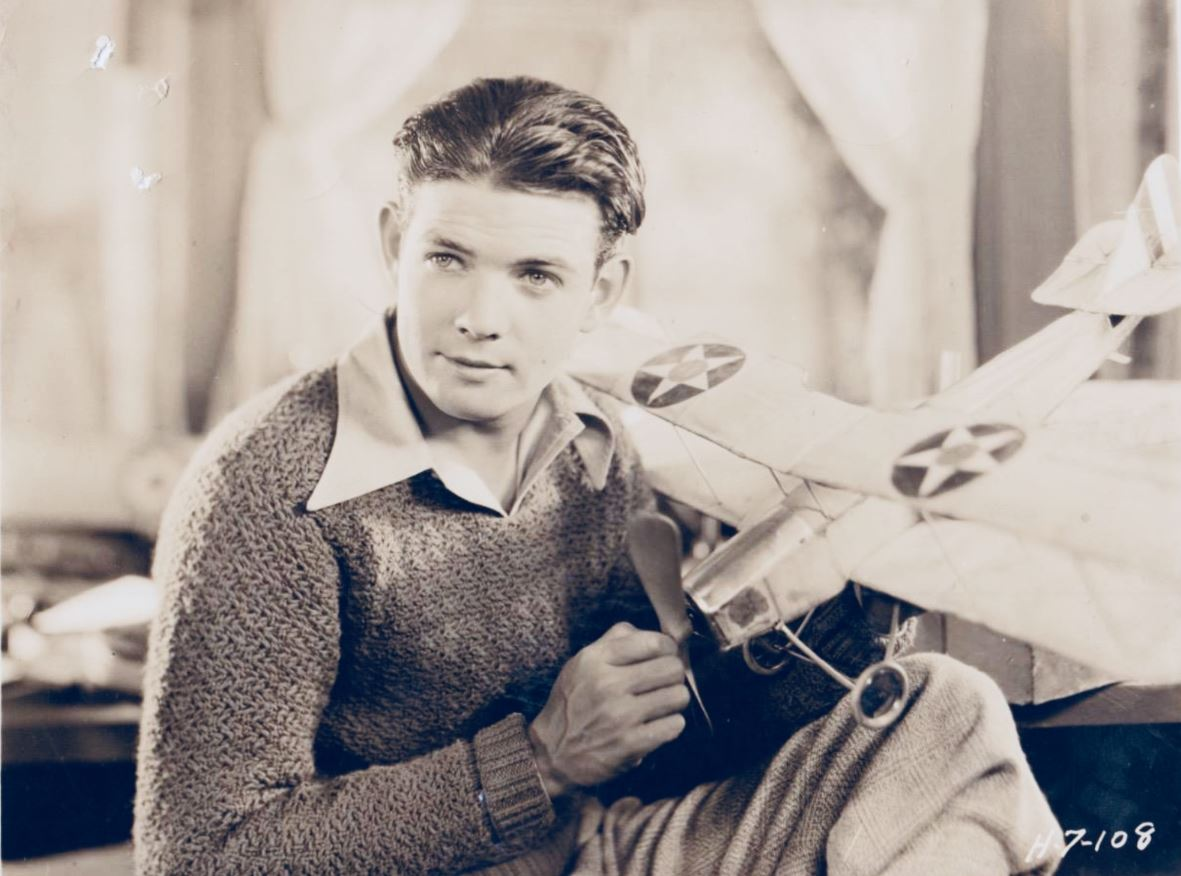
- Promotion still of David Rollins in the 1928 silent film Air Circus
- Born: David Jerome Rollins; September 2, 1907; Kansas City, Missouri, U.S.
- Died: August 6, 1997 (aged 89); Encinitas, California, U.S.
- Occupation: Actor
- Years active: 1927–1941

David Jerome Rollins (September 2, 1907 – August 6, 1997) was an American actor and later farmer who had a short but prolific career in films, including at least 16 full-length films between 1927 and 1932. His time in Hollywood straddled the shift from silent to talking pictures, with most of his roles being in silent movies, many now considered lost films. His most notable role came in the 1930 talkie The Big Trail, which featured John Wayne's first performance.

== Early life ==
Rollins was born on September 2, 1907, in Kansas City, Missouri, the youngest of six children born to George Rollins (1870-1947) and Katharine Mills Rollins (1872–1957). His father was a restaurant manager and later government accountant. His sister was the actress Sandra Morgan (birth name Martha Rollins). Rollins attended Northeast High School in Kansas City before moving to California and graduating from Glendale High School in Glendale, California, in 1925. The 1925 Glendale High School yearbook listed an expected attendance at the University of California.

== Career ==
Rollins earliest credited film role came playing a student in the 1927 silent film High School Hero, which is now considered lost. He appeared in dozens more films in the following years, including several for Fox Film Corporation, where he was under contract. These films included as a leading man in both Win That Girl and Prep and Pep, both released in 1928 and now considered lost films. His first sound film was a leading role as a pilot in The Air Circus, which was directed by Howard Hawks and co-starred Arthur Lake and Sue Carol and is considered lost. In 1930, Rollins had a noted supporting role in The Big Trail, John Wayne's first film. Following that movie, he had several more supporting roles in feature-length films, but never again appeared as a lead actor. After his film career ended he moved to New York City to work in the theatre, garnering at least one role in the short lived 1941 Broadway musical Crazy with the Heat, before retiring from acting.

== Personal life ==
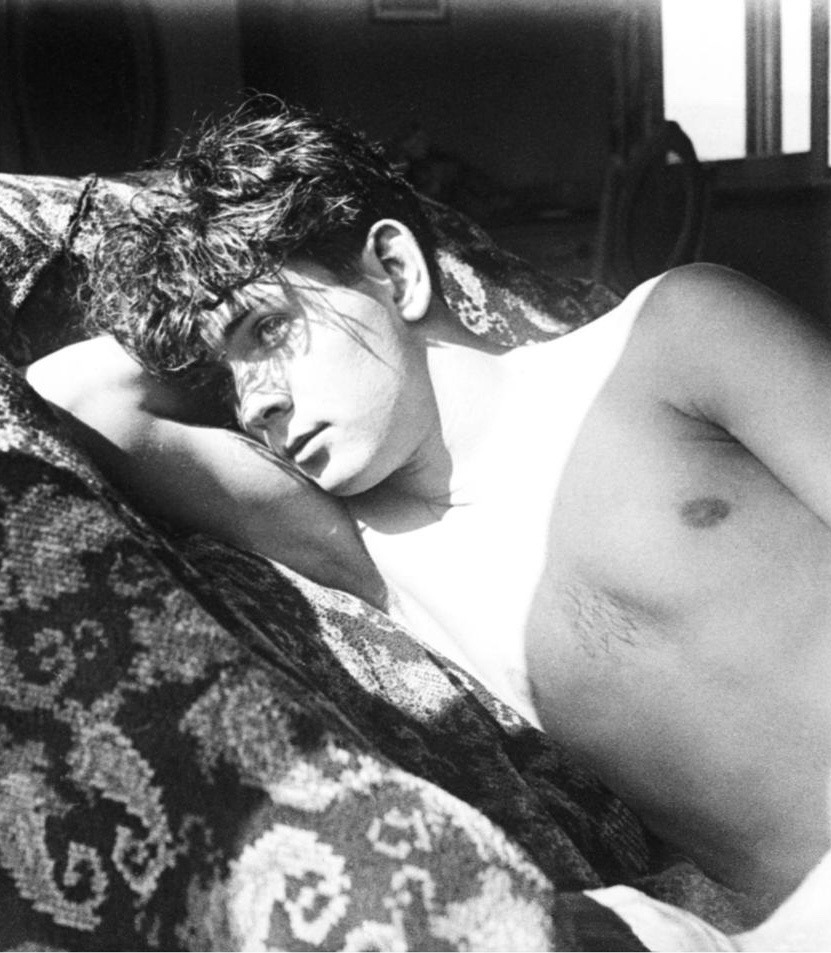
A photo taken by F. W. Murnau in late 1927 of Rollins reclining and shirtless

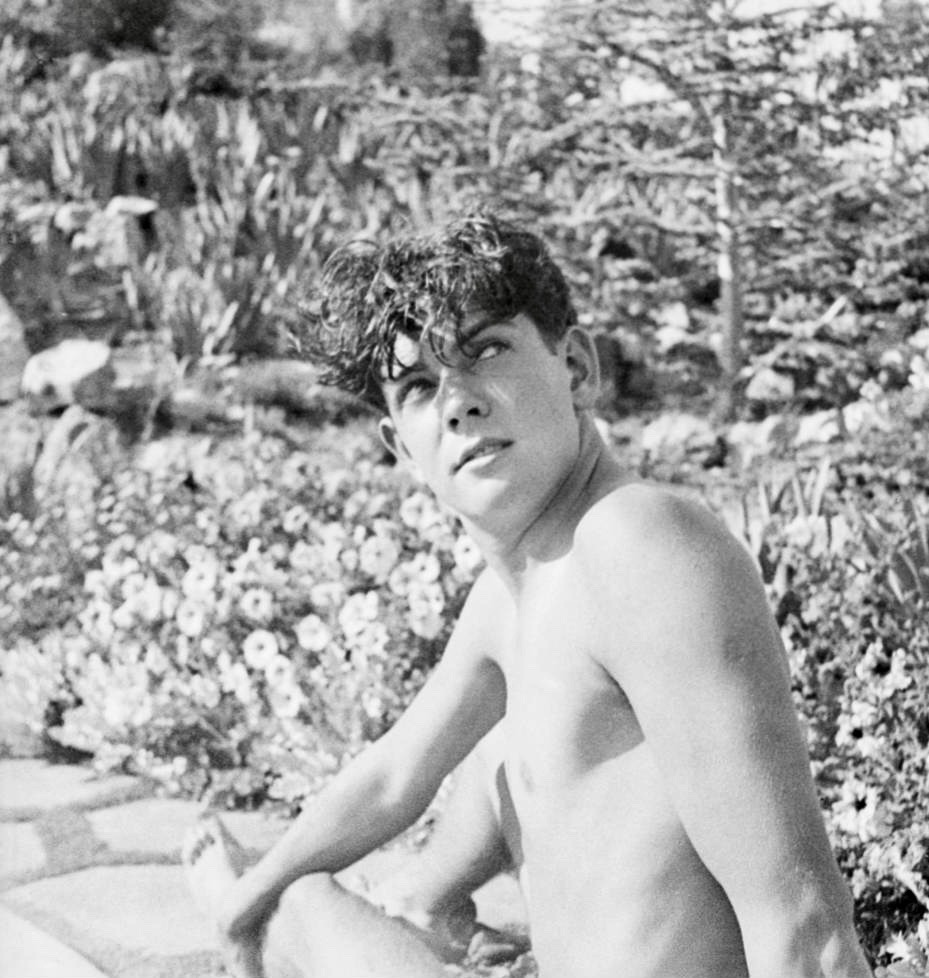
Rollins sits unclothed in a 1927 photo taken by F. W. Murnau.

After the end of his acting career, Rollins settled in Encinitas, California, and became an avocado farmer. He died on August 6, 1997, and was cremated, with his ashes being scattered in the Pacific Ocean.

=== Relationships ===
Early in his film career, Rollins was invited by director F. W. Murnau to spend time with him at his home, which has since been identified as the Wolf's Lair in Hollywood. On at least one of these visits in late 1927, Murnau convinced Rollins to pose nude, with the pool and garden of the Wolf's Lair serving as the backdrop. In a later interview Rollins said he was puzzled and surprised by the request, but felt comfortable enough with his body to oblige.

For several years Rollins lived with John Blair Linn Goodwin (1912–1994). Goodwin was a noted novelist, poet and painter and was mentioned multiple times in Christopher Isherwood's diaries. They were cohabitating as early as April 1937, when they listed the same address in New York City when they traveled together to Acapulco, Mexico. Three years later, Rollins is listed as Goodwin's partner in the 1940 census, while they were residing together in Orangetown, New York. At that time, Rollins' occupation was cited as a dog fancier at a kennel, and Goodwin was listed as unemployed. In October 1940 they both listed the same Manhattan address in their registration for the draft during World War II. By 1942, Rollins returned to California with Goodwin, as 1942 and 1944 voter registration records show they were living at the same address, during which time Rollins was listed as working as a farmer and Goodwin as a writer. Sometime after 1944 their relationship appears to have ended, as Goodwin's 1994 obituary listed Anthony P. Russo as his long-time friend and companion, with no reference to Rollins.

== Filmography ==
Features
Year	Title	Role	Notes
1927	High School Hero	Allen Drew	Lost film
1928	Thanks for the Buggy Ride	Harold McBridge	Lost film
1928	Win That Girl	Johnny Norton III	Lost film
1928	The Air Circus	Buddy Blake	Silent version exists, but the original sound version is considered lost
1928	Prep and Pep	Cyril Reade	Lost film
1928	Riley the Cop	David “Davy” Collins	
1929	The Black Watch	Lt. Malcolm King	
1929	Fox Movietone Follies of 1929	Uncredited	Lost film
1929	Why Leave Home?	Oscar	Lost film
1929	Happy Days	Minstrel Show Performer	
1929	Love, Live and Laugh	Pasquale Gallupi	Lost film
1930	City Girl	Uncredited	
1930	The Big Trail	Dave Cameron	
1931	Morals for Women	Bill Huston	
1932	Probation	Alec	
1932	The Phantom Express	Jackie Nolan	

Short subject
Year	Title	Role	Notes
1928	Love is Blonde	Uncredited	
1928	Forget Me Not	The Toymaker’s Son	
1931	Mama Loves Papa	Dave Culpepper	
1931	The Kick-Off	Dave Smith	
1932	Love Pains	Dave	
1932	The Hollywood Handicap	Character	
