= Win That Girl =

1928 film

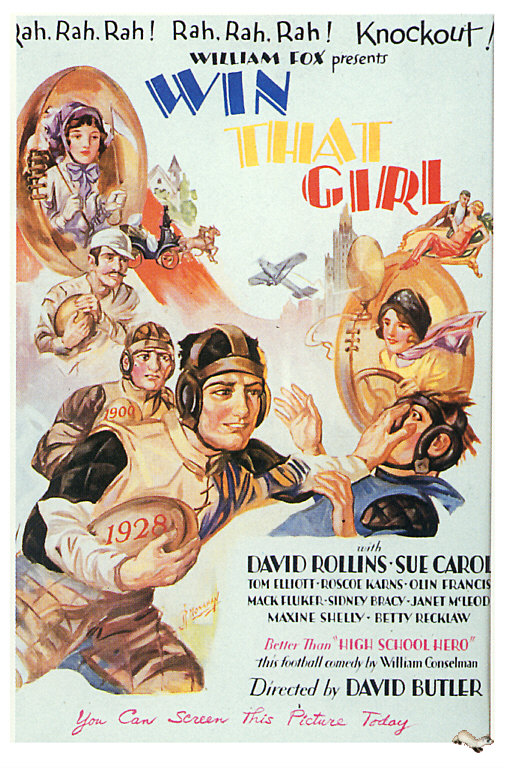
- Directed by: David Butler; Leslie Selander (assistant)
- Written by: John Stone (scenario); Dudley Early (intertitles)
- Based on: short story Father and Son by James Hopper
- Produced by: William Fox
- Starring: David Rollins; Sue Carol
- Cinematography: Glen MacWilliams
- Edited by: Irene Morra
- Distributed by: Fox Film Corporation
- Release date: September 16, 1928
- Running time: 59 minutes
- Country: USA
- Languages: Sound (Synchronized) (English Intertitles)

Win That Girl is a lost 1928 synchronized sound film comedy directed by David Butler and starring David Rollins and Sue Carol. It was produced and distributed by Fox Film Corporation. While the film has no audible dialog, it was released with a synchronized musical score with sound effects using the sound-on-film movietone process.

== Plot ==
A spirited generational rivalry spanning half a century comes to a head in this light-hearted football romance. The Norton and Brawn families have been gridiron adversaries since the 1880s, when Johnny Norton I (Mack Fluker) was first bested by Larry Brawn I (Sidney Bracey) on the football field. The feud reignites in 1905, as Johnny Norton II (Roscoe Karns) is once again defeated by Larry Brawn II (Olin Francis). Now, in 1928, the stage is set for the third and final showdown between the families—this time between their grandsons, Johnny Norton III (David Rollins) and Larry Brawn III (Tom Elliott).

Raised from birth to be Sanford College’s football savior, young Johnny III is a slender, undersized boy whose only athletic gift appears to be an uncanny knack for drop-kicking. His parents and grandfather, determined to end the Brawn supremacy, place him under strict medical care: he is given every vaccination imaginable, his tonsils and appendix are removed, and his diet is carefully regulated—all in pursuit of making him a football star. Yet one affliction goes undetected: hay fever, which plagues him just as he begins showing promise on the Sanford freshman team.

Meanwhile, Johnny III finds his heart captured by Gloria Havens (Sue Carol), the campus sweetheart. Gloria is equally drawn to Johnny's sincerity and quiet determination, but her affections are also sought by the boorish and boastful Larry Brawn III, who carries the weight and brawn of his lineage with pride.

Though ridiculed for his slight build, Johnny III gets his chance during the climactic Mammoth vs. Sanford game. With Sanford trailing and hope dwindling, he is substituted into the game and surprises everyone—not least of all his own family—with his speed, strategy, and unexpected toughness. The final play becomes a comedic spectacle, with Johnny sneezing from hay fever as he darts through the Mammoth defense. He miraculously scores the winning touchdown, finally breaking the Brawn curse and bringing glory to Sanford.

In the end, Johnny not only wins the game but also “wins that girl”—Gloria—cementing his place as the Norton family’s first football hero. Their victory is celebrated not just on the field, but as a culmination of generations of comical familial obsession.

== Cast ==
- David Rollins - Johnny Norton III
- Sue Carol - Gloria Havens
- Tom Elliott - Larry Brawn III
- Roscoe Karns - Johnny Norton II
- Olin Francis - Larry Brawn II
- Mack Fluker - Johnny Norton I
- Sidney Bracey - Larry Brawn I
- Janet McLeod - Clara Gentle
- Maxine Shelly - 1880 Girl
- Betty Recklaw - 1905 Girl

== Music ==
The song "Sunshine" by Irving Berlin is featured on the soundtrack and serves as the theme song for the film.

== See also ==
- 1937 Fox vault fire
- List of early sound feature films (1926–1929)
