= List of early sound feature films (1926–1929) =

This is a list of early pre-recorded synchronized Score/sound effects and part or full talking feature films made in the United States and Europe during the transition from silent film to sound, between 1926 and 1929. During this time a variety of recording systems were used, including sound on film formats such as Movietone and RCA Photophone, as well as sound on disc formats like Vitaphone. This list includes film titles, release dates, production companies, audio type and archive status; denoting whether they exist, are lost or incomplete, the film or audio elements exist only, as well as the number of discs extant for films recorded with Vitaphone soundtracks depending on the number of reels.

All films on this list are in the public domain.

== 1926 ==
Title	Release date	Company	Audio	Status	Video if available
Don Juan (Note: The first feature film to be released with a Vitaphone score and sound effects track.)	August 6, 1926	Warner Bros.	Synchronized score	Extant	
Till the Bells Ring	October 11, 1926 (Note: First shown privately on January 28, 1926 at the Holborn Empire in London.)	De Forest Phonofilm	All talkie	Two of three reels extant	
The Better 'Ole	October 23, 1926	Warner Bros.	Synchronized score	Extant	

== 1927 ==
Title	Release date	Company	Audio	Status	Video if available
What Price Glory (Note: Silent version released on November 23, 1926.)	January 21, 1927	Fox Film Corporation	Synchronized score	Extant	
When a Man Loves	February 3, 1927	Warner Bros.	Synchronized score	Extant	
The Missing Link	May 6, 1927	Warner Bros.	Synchronized score	Film-only	
Old San Francisco	June 21, 1927	Warner Bros.	Synchronized score	Extant	
The First Auto	June 27, 1927	Warner Bros.	Synchronized score	Extant	
The Bush Leaguer	August 20, 1927	Warner Bros.	Synchronized score	Audio-only	
The Desired Woman	August 27, 1927	Warner Bros.	Synchronized score	Lost	
Slightly Used	September 3, 1927	Warner Bros.	Synchronized score	Audio-only [Disc 5 extant]	
7th Heaven (Note: Silent version released on May 6, 1927.)	September 10, 1927	Fox Film Corporation	Synchronized score	Extant	
Jaws of Steel	September 10, 1927	Warner Bros.	Synchronized score	Film-only	
One Round Hogan	September 17, 1927	Warner Bros.	Synchronized score	Lost	
A Sailor's Sweetheart	September 24, 1927	Warner Bros.	Synchronized score	Incomplete	
The Jazz Singer (Note: The first feature film to feature dialogue and singing sequences.)	October 6, 1927	Warner Bros.	Part-talkie	Extant	
Sailor Izzy Murphy	October 8, 1927	Warner Bros.	Synchronized score	Lost	
A Reno Divorce	October 22, 1927	Warner Bros.	Synchronized score	Audio-only	
A Dog of the Regiment	October 29, 1927	Warner Bros.	Synchronized score	Audio-only [Discs 1–2, 4–5]	
Sunrise	November 4, 1927	Fox Film Corporation	Synchronized score	Extant	
Good Time Charley	November 5, 1927	Warner Bros.	Synchronized score	Extant [Discs 5, 7]	
The Fortune Hunter	November 7, 1927	Warner Bros.	Synchronized score	Audio-only	
The Silver Slave	November 12, 1927	Warner Bros.	Synchronized score	Lost	
The Girl from Chicago	November 19, 1927	Warner Bros.	Synchronized score	Lost	
Ginsberg the Great	November 26, 1927	Warner Bros.	Synchronized score	Audio-only [Disc 7 extant]	
Brass Knuckles	December 3, 1927	Warner Bros.	Synchronized score	Film-only	
If I Were Single	December 17, 1927	Warner Bros.	Synchronized score	Film-only	
Ham and Eggs at the Front	December 24, 1927	Warner Bros.	Synchronized score	Film-only	
Husbands for Rent	December 31, 1927	Warner Bros.	Synchronized score	Audio-only [Disc 3 extant]	

== 1928 ==
Title	Release date	Company	Audio	Status	Video if available
Beware of Married Men	January 14, 1928	Warner Bros.	Synchronized score	Incomplete	
Mother Machree (Note: Silent version premiered on June 3, 1927.)	January 22, 1928	Fox Film Corporation	Synchronized score	Incomplete	
A Race for Life	January 28, 1928	Warner Bros.	Synchronized score	Extant [Disc 6 only]	
The Little Snob	February 11, 1928	Warner Bros.	Synchronized score	Audio-only [Disc 6 extant]	
Four Sons	February 13, 1928	Fox Film Corporation	Synchronized score	Extant	
Across the Atlantic	February 25, 1928	Warner Bros.	Synchronized score	Lost	
Powder My Back	March 10, 1928	Warner Bros.	Synchronized score	Lost	
Tenderloin (Note: The first sound film with scripted dialogue scenes.)	March 14, 1928	Warner Bros.	Part-talkie	Audio-only [Disc 1 Extant]	
Domestic Troubles	March 28, 1928	Warner Bros.	Synchronized score	Lost	
Ladies' Night in a Turkish Bath	April 1, 1928	First National	Synchronized score	Film-only	
The Crimson City	April 7, 1928	Warner Bros.	Synchronized score	Film-only	
Street Angel	April 9, 1928	Fox Film Corporation	Synchronized score	Extant	
Glorious Betsy	April 16, 1928	Warner Bros.	Part-talkie	Extant [Discs 1–4, 6–8]	
Rinty of the Desert	April 21, 1928	Warner Bros.	Synchronized score	Lost	
Pay as You Enter	May 12, 1928	Warner Bros.	Synchronized score	Audio-only	
Ramona (Note: Silent version released on March 6, 1928.)	May 20, 1928	United Artists	Synchronized score	Film-only	
Five and Ten Cent Annie	May 28, 1928	Warner Bros.	Part-talkie	Incomplete	
Fazil	June 4, 1928	Fox Film Corporation	Synchronized score	Extant	
The Lion and the Mouse	June 15, 1928	Warner Bros.	Part-talkie	Extant [Discs 1, 3–6, 9]	
The Red Dance	June 25, 1928	Fox Film Corporation	Synchronized score	Extant	
Lights of New York (Note: The first 'all talking' feature film.)	July 8, 1928	Warner Bros.	All-talkie	Extant	
Warming Up	July 15, 1928	Paramount	Synchronized score	Lost (Note: The disc for the overture track and theme song exists.)	
Tempest (Note: Silent version released on May 17, 1928.)	July 21, 1928	United Artists	Synchronized score	Extant	
Loves of an Actress	July 29, 1928	Paramount	Synchronized score	Lost	
White Shadows in the South Seas (Note: The MGM lion roars for the first time in sound, in MGM's first sound film.)	July 31, 1928	MGM	Synchronized score	Extant	
The Scarlet Lady	August 1, 1928	Columbia	Synchronized score	Film-only	
The Perfect Crime (Note: FBO became the second studio to release a part-talkie.)	August 4, 1928	FBO	Part-talkie	Lost	
Women They Talk About	August 11, 1928	Warner Bros.	Part-talkie	Audio-only [Disc 6 extant]	
The Patriot	August 19, 1928	Paramount	Part-talkie	Incomplete	
Caught in the Fog	August 25, 1928	Warner Bros.	Part-talkie	Incomplete [Discs 1-7]	
The First Kiss	August 25, 1928	Paramount	Synchronized Score	Lost	
The River Pirate	August 26, 1928	Fox Film Corporation	Part-talkie	Extant	
Two Lovers (Note: Silent version released on March 23, 1928.)	August 27, 1928	United Artists	Synchronized score	Extant [Discs 1–4, 6, 10]	
Submarine	August 28, 1928	Columbia	Synchronized score	Extant [Discs 2–3, 9]	
Our Dancing Daughters	September 1, 1928	MGM	Synchronized score	Extant	
The Sawdust Paradise	September 1, 1928	Paramount	Synchronized score	Lost	
Gang War	September 2, 1928	FBO	Part-talkie	Incomplete (Note: Released with Walt Disney's Steamboat Willie.) [Discs 1-2]	
State Street Sadie	September 2, 1928	Warner Bros.	Part-talkie	Audio-only [Discs 1–3, 8]	
Uncle Tom's Cabin (Note: Silent version released on November 4, 1927.)	September 2, 1928	Universal	Synchronized score	Extant	
The Terror (Note: Instead of opening titles, the credits are spoken by a caped and masked Conrad Nagel.)	September 6, 1928	Warner Bros.	All-talkie	Audio-only	
Excess Baggage	September 8, 1928	MGM	Synchronized score	Audio-only	
The Night Watch	September 9, 1928	First National	Synchronized score	Film-only	
While the City Sleeps	September 15, 1928	MGM	Synchronized score	Incomplete [Discs 1-8]	
Win That Girl	September 16, 1928	Fox Film Corporation	Synchronized score	Lost	
The Whip	September 16, 1928	First National	Synchronized score	Film-only	
Waterfront	September 16, 1928	First National	Synchronized score	Extant	
Mother Knows Best (Note: The first part-talkie to include multiple scenes filmed in Movietone.)	September 16, 1928	Fox Film Corporation	Part-talkie	Lost	
The Singing Fool	September 19, 1928	Warner Bros.	Part-talkie	Extant	
Beggars of Life	September 22, 1928	Paramount	Part-talkie	Extant [Disc 1 only]	
Hit of the Show	September 23, 1928	FBO	Part-talkie	Film-only	
Plastered In Paris	September 23, 1928	Fox Film Corporation	Synchronized score	Lost	
Show Girl	September 28, 1928	First National	Synchronized score	Extant	
The King of Kings (Note: Silent version released on April 19, 1927.)	September 30, 1928	Pathé	Synchronized score	Extant	
The Air Circus	September 30, 1928	Fox Film Corporation	Part-talkie	Lost	
Lonesome (Note: Silent version released on June 20, 1928.)	September 30, 1928	Universal	Part-talkie	Extant	
The Toilers	October 1, 1928	Tiffany Pictures	Synchronized score	Extant	
4 Devils (Note: Soon after release, the film was pulled from distribution and the final two reels were refilmed with sound without Murnau's input. It was re-released on June 15, 1929.)	October 3, 1928	Fox Film Corporation	Synchronized score (1928); Part-talkie (1929)	Audio-only [Disc 4 extant]	
The Wedding March	October 6, 1928	Paramount	Synchronized score	Extant	
Dry Martini	October 7, 1928	Fox Film Corporation	Synchronized score	Lost	
The Crash	October 7, 1928	First National	Synchronized score	Lost	
The Circus Kid	October 7, 1928	FBO	Part-talkie	Film-only	
Melody of Love	October 10, 1928	Universal	All-talkie	Incomplete	
The Battle of the Sexes	October 10, 1928	United Artists	Synchronized score	Extant [Discs 2–4, 8]	
Captain Swagger	October 14, 1928	Pathé	Synchronized score	Extant	
Lilac Time (Note: Silent version released on August 3, 1928.)	October 18, 1928	First National	Synchronized score	Extant [Discs 1, 5–7]	
Land of the Silver Fox	October 18, 1928	Warner Bros.	Part-talkie	Extant [Discs 1–2, 4–7]	
Me, Gangster	October 20, 1928	Fox Film Corporation	Synchronized score	Lost	
Show Folks	October 21, 1928	Pathé	Part-talkie	Extant	
The Woman Disputed	October 21, 1928	United Artists	Synchronized score	Extant [Discs 1-2, 4-9]	
Should A Girl Marry?	October 22, 1928	Rayart Pictures	Part-talkie	Lost	
The Home Towners	October 23, 1928	Warner Bros.	All-talkie	Audio-only [Discs 3–4, 7, 10]	
Varsity	October 27, 1928	Paramount	Part-talkie	Lost	
Beware of Bachelors	October 27, 1928	Warner Bros.	Part-talkie	Extant [Discs 1, 4–8]	
The Midnight Taxi	October 28, 1928	Warner Bros.	Part-talkie	Film-only	
Noah's Ark (Note: Soon after release, Warner Bros pulled it from release and re-edited some of the talking sequences.)	November 1, 1928	Warner Bros.	Part-talkie	Extant	
The Cavalier	November 1, 1928	Tiffany Pictures	Synchronized score	Film-only	
The Viking (Note: The first feature film shot in Technicolor to include a soundtrack.)	November 2, 1928	MGM	Synchronized score	Extant	
Revenge	November 3, 1928	United Artists	Synchronized score	Extant [Disc 5 only]	
The Baby Cyclone	November 3, 1928	MGM	Synchronized score	Lost	
Abie's Irish Rose (Note: The film was originally released as a silent on April 19, 1928. It was then pulled from release and dialogue scenes were added.)	November 3, 1928	Paramount	Part-talkie	Incomplete	
The Woman from Moscow	November 3, 1928	Paramount	Synchronized score	Incomplete, Reels 4, 6, and 7 Status unclear following 2020 apartment fire incident	
Marked Money	November 4, 1928	Pathé	Synchronized score	Extant	
The Haunted House	November 4, 1928	First National	Synchronized score	Audio-only	
The Man Who Laughs (Note: Silent version released on April 27, 1928.)	November 4, 1928	Universal	Synchronized score	Extant	
Interference (Note: Originally filmed a silent; it was completely remade in sound with the direction by Roy Pomeroy.)	November 5, 1928	Paramount	All-talkie	Extant	
Marriage by Contact	November 9, 1928	Tiffany Pictures	Part-talkie	Incomplete	
Taxi 13	November 11, 1928	FBO	Part-talkie	Film-only	
Romance of the Underworld	November 11, 1928	Fox Film Corporation	Synchronized score	Extant	
Outcast	November 11, 1928	First National	Synchronized score	Film-only	
On Trial	November 14, 1928	Warner Bros.	All-talkie	Audio-only [Discs 1–2, 4–5, 7, 9–10]	
Alias Jimmy Valentine (Note: A four reel condensed version was located in Italy.)	November 15, 1928	MGM	Part-talkie	Incomplete	
Confetti (Note: Silent version released on January 4, 1928.)	November 15, 1928	Pathe	Synchronized score	Lost	
The Awakening	November 17, 1928	United Artists	Synchronized score	Incomplete	
The Masks of the Devil	November 17, 1928	MGM	Synchronized score	Lost	
His Private Life	November 17, 1928	Paramount	Synchronized score	Lost	
The Good-Bye Kiss	November 18, 1928	First National	Synchronized score	Lost	
Annapolis	November 18, 1928	Pathé	Synchronized score	Film-only	
Prep and Pep	November 18, 1928	Fox Film Corporation	Synchronized score	Lost	
Show People	November 20, 1928	MGM	Synchronized score	Extant	
The Wind	November 23, 1928	MGM	Synchronized score	Extant	
Manhattan Cocktail	November 24, 1928	Paramount	Part-talkie	Incomplete	
West of Zanzibar	November 24, 1928	MGM	Synchronized score	Extant	
Riley the Cop	November 25, 1928	Fox Film Corporation	Synchronized score	Extant	
A Lady of Chance	December 1, 1928	MGM	Synchronized score	Extant [Disc 2 only]	
Dream of Love	December 1, 1928	MGM	Synchronized score	Lost	
The River Woman	December 1, 1928	Gotham Productions	Part-talkie	Incomplete	
Ned McCobb's Daughter	December 2, 1928	Pathé	Synchronized score	Lost	
Adoration	December 2, 1928	First National	Synchronized score	Incomplete	
The Little Wildcat	December 8, 1928	Warner Bros.	Part-talkie	Lost	
Give and Take	December 9, 1928	Universal	Part-talkie	Lost	
Blindfold	December 9, 1928	Fox Film Corporation	Synchronized score	Lost	
The Barker	December 9, 1928	First National	Part-talkie	Extant	
Speedy (Note: The film was originally released as a silent on April 7, 1928. It was then pulled from release and dialogue scenes were added.)	December 15, 1928	Paramount	Part-talkie	Extant	
A Woman of Affairs	December 15, 1928	MGM	Synchronized score	Extant	
The Shady Lady	December 16, 1928	Pathé	Part-talkie	Lost	
Homesick	December 16, 1928	Fox Film Corporation	Synchronized score	Lost	
Blockade	December 16, 1928	FBO	Part-talkie	Lost	
Naughty Baby	December 16, 1928	First National	Synchronized score	Extant	
The Spieler	December 20, 1928	Pathé	Part-talkie	Film-only	
My Man	December 21, 1928	Warner Bros.	Part-talkie	Incomplete	
Conquest	December 22, 1928	Warner Bros.	All-talkie	Audio-only	
The River	December 22, 1928	Fox Film Corporation	Part-talkie	Incomplete	
Red Wine	December 23, 1928	Fox Film Corporation	Synchronized score	Lost	
Brotherly Love	December 23, 1928	MGM	Part-talkie	Extant	
The Last Warning	December 25, 1928	Universal	Part-talkie	Silent version only	
In Old Arizona (Note: First all-talking feature with outdoor location filming.)	December 25, 1928	Fox Film Corporation	All-talkie	Extant	
Sins of the Fathers	December 29, 1928	Paramount	Part-talkie	Incomplete	
The Shopworn Angel	December 29, 1928	Paramount	Part-talkie	Incomplete	
The Great White North aka Lost In The Arctic	December 30, 1928	Fox Film Corporation	Part-talkie (Talking prologue)	Lost	
Scarlet Seas	December 30, 1928	First National	Synchronized score	Extant	

== 1929 ==
Title	Release date	Company	Audio	Status	Video if available
Sal of Singapore (Note: Silent version released on November 4, 1928.)	January 4, 1929	Pathé	Part-talkie	Extant	
Wings (Note: Silent version released on August 12, 1927.)	January 5, 1929	Paramount	Synchronized score	Extant	
Captain Lash	January 6, 1929	Fox Film Corporation	Synchronized score	Extant	
The Jazz Age	January 6, 1929	FBO	Part-talkie	Extant	
Synthetic Sin	January 9, 1929	First National	Synchronized score	Extant [Disc 6 only]	
The Rescue	January 12, 1929	United Artists	Synchronized score	Incomplete	
Man, Woman and Wife	January 13, 1929	Universal	Synchronized score	Extant	
I Kiss Your Hand, Madame (Note: The first sound film produced in Europe to be released.)	January 16, 1929	Tobis	Synchronized score	Extant	
The Flying Fleet	January 19, 1929	MGM	Synchronized score	Extant	
Geraldine	January 20, 1929	Pathé	Part-talkie	Extant	
Silks and Saddles	January 20, 1929	Universal	All-talkie	Extant	
True Heaven	January 20, 1929	Fox Film Corporation	Synchronized score	Lost	
Lady of the Pavements	January 22, 1929	United Artists	Part-talkie	Extant	
The Bellamy Trial	January 23, 1929	MGM	Part-talkie	Incomplete	
The Doctor's Secret	January 26, 1929	Paramount	All-talkie	Lost	
Fancy Baggage	January 26, 1929	Warner Bros.	Part-talkie	Audio-only [Discs 1–2, 4–8]	
Red Hot Speed	January 27, 1929	Universal	Part-talkie	Lost	
Seven Footprints to Satan	January 27, 1929	First National	Synchronized score	International Sound Version [Discs 2, 5–6]	
Fugitives	January 27, 1929	Fox Film Corporation	Synchronized score	Lost	
Noisy Neighbours	January 27, 1929	Pathé	Part-talkie	Extant	
Moulin Rouge (Note: Silent version released on March 22, 1928.)	January 30, 1929	British International Pictures	Synchronized score	Extant	
The Rainbow	February 1, 1929	Tiffany Pictures	Synchronized score	Incomplete	
The Broadway Melody (Note: The first feature film to include a Technicolor insert filmed in sound.)	February 1, 1929	MGM	All-talkie	Extant	
Lucky Boy	February 2, 1929	Tiffany Pictures	Part-talkie	Extant	
The Wolf of Wall Street	February 2, 1929	Paramount	All-talkie	Incomplete	
Cheyenne	February 2, 1929	First National	Synchronized score	Lost	
Stark Mad	February 2, 1929	Warner Bros.	All-talkie	Audio-only	
The Alley Cat	February 3, 1929	Orplid Film	Synchronized score	Extant	
The Girl on the Barge	February 3, 1929	Universal	Part-talkie	Lost	
The Million Dollar Collar	February 9, 1929	Warner Bros.	Part-talkie	Lost	
The Greyhound Limited	February 9, 1929	Warner Bros.	Part-talkie	Extant [Discs 1–4, 6]	
The Sin Sister	February 10, 1929	Fox Film Corporation	Synchronized score	Lost	
Weary River	February 10, 1929	First National	Part-talkie	Extant	
Homecoming (Note: Silent version released on the August 29, 1928.)	February 16, 1929	UFA / Paramount	Synchronized score	Extant	
The Redeeming Sin	February 16, 1929	Warner Bros.	Part-talkie	Audio-only [Discs 1–2, 4–5, 7]	
Making the Grade	February 17, 1929	Fox Film Corporation	Part-talkie	Extant	
The Royal Rider	February 17, 1929	First National	Synchronized score	Lost	
The Lawless Legion	February 17, 1929	First National	Synchronized score	Lost	
The Lone Wolf's Daughter (Note: Columbia was the last of the Hollywood majors to release a part-talkie.)	February 18, 1929	Columbia	Part-talkie	Audio-only [Disc 3]	
The Iron Mask	February 21, 1929	United Artists	Part-talkie	Extant	
Redskin	February 23, 1929	Paramount	Synchronized score	Extant	
Stolen Kisses	February 23, 1929	Warner Bros.	Part-talkie	Audio-only	
Wild Orchids	February 23, 1929	MGM	Synchronized score	Extant	
New Year's Eve	February 23, 1929	Fox Film Corporation	Synchronized score	Lost	
The Leatherneck	February 24, 1929	Pathé	Part-talkie	Silent version only [Discs 1–8]	
The Ghost Talks	February 24, 1929	Fox Film Corporation	All-talkie	Lost	
Sonny Boy	February 27, 1929	Warner Bros.	Part-talkie	Extant [Discs 1, 3, 5]	
The Canary Murder Case (Note: Louise Brooks was dubbed and doubled by Margaret Livingston when the film was reworked for sound.)	February 28, 1929	Paramount	All-talkie	Extant	
Brothers	March 1, 1929	Rayart Pictures	Synchronized score	Extant	
Molly and Me	March 1, 1929	Tiffany Pictures	Part-talkie	Incomplete [Missing reel 7]	
The Clue of the New Pin (Note: The first sound feature film shot in the United Kingdom.)	March 1, 1929	British Lion Film Corporation	All-talkie	Incomplete	
The Carnation Kid	March 2, 1929	Paramount	Part-talkie	Extant	
Clear the Decks	March 3, 1929	Universal	Part-talkie	Lost	
Children of the Ritz	March 3, 1929	First National	Synchronized score	Audio-only [Discs 5–6]	
The Office Scandal	March 3, 1929	Pathé	Part-talkie	Extant	
Strong Boy	March 3, 1929	Fox Film Corporation	Synchronized score	Lost [Trailer extant]	
The Younger Generation	March 4, 1929	Columbia	Part-talkie	Extant	
Speakeasy	March 8, 1929	Fox Film Corporation	All-talkie	Audio-only	
Desert Nights	March 9, 1929	MGM	Synchronized score	Extant	
The Dummy	March 9, 1929	Paramount	All-talkie	Extant	
Square Shoulders	March 10, 1929	Pathé	Synchronized score	Extant	
The Shakedown	March 10, 1929	Universal	Part-talkie	International-sound version only	
Trial Marriage	March 10, 1929	Columbia	Synchronized score	Extant	
Hearts in Dixie	March 10, 1929	Fox Film Corporation	All-talkie	Extant	
Melody of the World	March 12, 1929	Tobis	Synchronized score	Extant	
Why Be Good?	March 12, 1929	First National	Synchronized score	Extant	
Looping the Loop (Note: Silent version released on September 15, 1928.)	March 16, 1929	Paramount / UFA	Synchronized score	Lost	
Show Boat	March 16, 1929	Universal	Part-talkie	Extant [Discs 1, 3, 5-8, 13]	
One Stolen Night	March 16, 1929	Warner Bros.	Part-talkie	Audio-only [Discs 1, 4–5]	
The Duke Steps Out	March 16, 1929	MGM	Synchronized score	Audio-only	
Hawk of the Hills (Note: Edited re-release, originally released as a serial in 1927.)	March 17, 1929	Pathé	Synchronized score	Extant (Note: Originally released as a ten chapter serial in 1927, the film was re-edited to feature length for its re-release in 1929.)	
The Cohens and the Kellys in Atlantic City	March 17, 1929	Universal	Part-talkie	Extant	
Love in the Desert (Note: Silent version released on January 27, 1929.)	March 17, 1929	FBO	Part-talkie	Extant	
The Letter	March 17, 1929	Paramount	All-talkie	Extant	
Blue Skies	March 17, 1929	Fox Film Corporation	Synchronized score	Lost	
Two Sisters	March 23, 1929	Rayart Pictures	Synchronized score	Lost	
The Great Power	March 23, 1929	MGM	All-talkie	Lost	
Queen of the Night Clubs	March 24, 1929	Warner Bros.	All-talkie	Incomplete	
Girls Gone Wild	March 24, 1929	Fox Film Corporation	Synchronized score	Lost	
It Can Be Done	March 24, 1929	Universal	Part-talkie	Lost	
Syncopation (Note: First all-talking feature film filmed in RCA Photophone.)	March 24, 1929	RKO	All-talkie	Extant	
Love and the Devil	March 24, 1929	First National	Synchronized score	Extant	
The Crimson Circle (Note: Some sequences were dubbed, using the DeForest Phonofilm sound-on-film process)	March 25, 1929	British International Pictures / Efzet Film	Part-talkie	Lost	
The Bridge of San Luis Ray	March 30, 1929	MGM	Part-talkie	Silent version only [Discs 2–3, 7, 9–10]	
Wolf Song	March 30, 1929	Paramount	Part-talkie	Extant [Disc 9 only]	
Chinatown Nights (Note: Florence Vidor was dubbed by actress Nella Walker.)	March 30, 1929	Paramount	All-talkie	Extant	
Hardboiled Rose	March 30, 1929	Warner Bros.	Part-talkie	Extant [Disc 4 only]	
Strange Cargo	March 31, 1929	Pathé	All-talkie	Extant	
The Godless Girl (Note: Silent version released in August 1928.)	March 31, 1929	Pathé	Part-talkie	Extant	
Trent's Last Case	March 31, 1929	Fox Film Corporation	Synchronized score	Extant	
Linda	March 31, 1929	Mrs Wallace Reid Productions	Synchronized score	Extant	
The Divine Lady	March 31, 1929	First National	Synchronized score	Extant	
My Lady's Past	April 1, 1929	Tiffany Pictures	Part-talkie	Extant	
His Captive Woman	April 2, 1929	First National	Part-talkie	Extant	
No Defense	April 6, 1929	Warner Bros.	Part-talkie	Lost	
Spite Marriage	April 6, 1929	MGM	Synchronized score	Extant	
The Wild Party	April 6, 1929	Paramount	All-talkie	Extant	
Coquette	April 6, 1929	United Artists	All-talkie	Extant	
Black Waters (Note: The first 'all talking' British feature, although it was filmed in the United States.)	April 6, 1929	British & Dominions Film Corporation	All-talkie	Lost	
Not Quite Decent	April 7, 1929	Fox Film Corporation	Part-talkie	Lost	
Hot Stuff	April 7, 1929	First National	Part-talkie	Audio-only [Discs 2–8]	
The Desert Song	April 8, 1929	Warner Bros.	All-talkie	Incomplete [B/W only]	
The Donovan Affair	April 11, 1929	Columbia	All-talkie	Film-only	
The Voice of the City	April 13, 1929	MGM	All-talkie	Extant	
Close Harmony	April 13, 1929	Paramount	All-talkie	Extant	
Thru Different Eyes	April 14, 1929	Fox Film Corporation	All-talkie	Silent version only	
The Charlatan	April 14, 1929	Universal	Part-talkie	Extant	
The Veiled Woman	April 14, 1929	Fox Film Corporation	Synchronized score	Lost	
Saturday's Children	April 14, 1929	First National	Part-talkie	Audio-only	
The Voice Within	April 15, 1929	Tiffany Pictures	Part-talkie	Lost	
Frozen River	April 20, 1929	Warner Bros.	Part-talkie	Audio-only [Discs 1, 3–6]	
Nothing But the Truth	April 20, 1929	Paramount	All-talkie	Extant	
Alibi	April 20, 1929	United Artists	All-talkie	Extant	
The Woman from Hell	April 21, 1929	Fox Film Corporation	Synchronized score	Lost	
Tide of Empire	April 23, 1929	MGM	Synchronized score	Extant	
Scandal	April 27, 1929	Universal	Part-talkie	Lost	
The Pagan	April 27, 1929	MGM	Synchronized score	Extant	
Kid Gloves	April 27, 1929	Warner Bros.	Part-talkie	Extant	
The Hole in the Wall	April 27, 1929	Paramount	All-talkie	Extant	
From Headquarters	April 27, 1929	Warner Bros.	Part-talkie	Lost	
The Far Call	April 28, 1929	Fox Film Corporation	Synchronized score	Lost	
Betrayal	April 28, 1929	Paramount	Synchronized score	Lost	
House of Horror	April 28, 1929	First National	Part-talkie	Audio-only	
The Return of the Rat	May 1, 1929	Gainsborough Pictures	Synchronized score	Extant	
Would You Believe It!	May 1, 1929	Nettlefold Films	Synchronized score	Extant	
Bulldog Drummond	May 2, 1929	United Artists	All-talkie	Extant	
Glad Rag Doll	May 4, 1929	Warner Bros.	Part-talkie	Audio-only [Discs 7–8]	
Where East Is East	May 4, 1929	MGM	Synchronized score	Extant	
Gentlemen of the Press	May 4, 1929	Paramount	All-talkie	Extant	
Protection	May 5, 1929	Fox Film Corporation	Synchronized score	Lost	
Mother's Boy	May 5, 1929	Pathé	All-talkie	International-sound version only	
Venus	May 6, 1929	United Artists	Synchronized score	Audio-only	
The Black Watch	May 8, 1929	Fox Film Corporation	All-talkie	Extant	
The Squall	May 9, 1929	First National	All-talkie	Extant	
Eternal Love	May 11, 1929	United Artists	Synchronized score	Extant	
No Defence	May 11, 1929	Warner Bros.	Part-talkie	Audio-only [Discs 2–7]	
Joy Street	May 12, 1929	Fox Film Corporation	Synchronized score	Lost	
Two Weeks Off	May 12, 1929	First National	Part-talkie	Extant	
Father and Son	May 13, 1929	Columbia	Part-talkie	Extant	
A Dangerous Woman	May 18, 1929	Paramount	All-talkie	Extant	
The Rainbow Man	May 18, 1929	Sono Art-World Wide Pictures	All-talkie	Extant	
Prisoners	May 19, 1929	First National	Part-talkie	Audio-only [Discs 1–4, 6–7]	
The Valiant	May 19, 1929	Fox Film Corporation	All-talkie	Extant	
The Bachelor Girl	May 20, 1929	Columbia	Part-talkie	Lost	
A Man's Man	May 25, 1929	MGM	Synchronized score	Audio-only	
Border Romance	May 25, 1929	Tiffany Pictures	All-talkie	Extant	
Innocents of Paris	May 25, 1929	Paramount	All-talkie	Extant	
The Man I Love	May 25, 1929	Paramount	All-talkie	Extant	
Love at First Sight	May 26, 1929	Chesterfield Pictures	All-talkie	Lost	
The House of Secrets	May 26, 1929	Chesterfield Pictures	All-talkie	Audio-only [Discs 1, 3, 5–7]	
Fox Movietone Follies of 1929	May 26, 1929	Fox Film Corporation	All-talkie	Incomplete	
Broadway (Note: A specially designed camera crane was used for some scenes.)	May 27, 1929	Universal	All-talkie	Extant	
On with the Show! (Note: First all-talking feature shot entirely in Technicolor.)	May 28, 1929	Warner Bros.	All-talkie	B/W only [color incomplete]	
Tesha (Note: Silent version released on August 24, 1928.)	June 1, 1929	British International Pictures	Synchronized score	Lost	
The Three Passions (Note: Silent version released on December 12, 1928.)	June 1, 1929	United Artists	Synchronized score	Extant [Discs 2–3 & 8]	
The Studio Murder Mystery	June 1, 1929	Paramount	All-talkie	Extant	
Piccadilly (Note: Silent version released in February 1929; reissued in the United States with a sound prologue.)	June 1, 1929	British International Pictures	Part-talkie	Extant	
New Orleans	June 2, 1929	Tiffany Pictures	Part-talkie	Audio-only	
His Lucky Day	June 2, 1929	Universal	Part-talkie	Lost	
Careers	June 2, 1929	First National	All-talkie	Silent version only	
The One Woman Idea	June 2, 1929	Fox Film Corporation	Synchronized score	Lost	
The Flying Marine	June 5, 1929	Columbia	Part-talkie	Extant	
She Goes to War	June 8, 1929	United Artists	Part-talkie	Incomplete	
The Trial of Mary Dugan	June 8, 1929	MGM	All-talkie	Extant	
The Exalted Flapper	June 9, 1929	Fox Film Corporation	Synchronized score	Lost	
Two Men and a Maid	June 10, 1929	Tiffany Pictures	Part-talkie	Audio-only [Discs 1 & 3]	
Kitty (Note: The second half of the film was shot in sound at RKO Studios in Hollywood, due to the lack of suitable facilities in the United Kingdom at the time.)	June 10, 1929	British International Pictures	Part-talkie	Extant	
The Four Feathers	June 12, 1929	Paramount	Synchronized score	Extant	
The Idle Rich	June 15, 1929	MGM	All-talkie	Extant	
The Wheel of Life	June 15, 1929	Paramount	All-talkie	Extant	
Thunderbolt	June 20, 1929	Paramount	All-talkie	Extant	
The Hollywood Revue of 1929	June 20, 1929	MGM	All-talkie	Extant	
The Flying Fool	June 21, 1929	Pathé	All-talkie	Extant	
Madonna of Avenue A	June 22, 1929	Warner Bros.	Part-talkie	Audio-only [Discs 1–6]	
This Is Heaven	June 22, 1929	United Artists	Part-talkie	Audio-only [Discs 2–9]	
Masked Emotions	June 23, 1929	Fox Film Corporation	Synchronized score	Lost	
The Girl in the Glass Cage	June 23, 1929	First National	Part-talkie	Audio-only	
The Fall of Eve	June 25, 1929	Columbia	All-talkie	Extant	
The Gamblers	June 29, 1929	Warner Bros.	All-talkie	Audio-only	
High Voltage	June 29, 1929	Pathé	All-talkie	Extant	
Fashions in Love	June 29, 1929	Paramount	All-talkie	Extant	
River of Romance	June 29, 1929	Paramount	All-talkie	Extant	
Come Across	June 30, 1929	Universal	Part-talkie	Extant	
Broadway Babies	June 30, 1929	First National	All-talkie	Extant	
Behind That Curtain	June 30, 1929	Fox Film Corporation	All-talkie	Extant	
Taxi for Two	July 1, 1929	Gainsborough Pictures	Part-talkie	Lost	
Divorce Made Easy	July 6, 1929	Paramount	All-talkie	Extant	
Pals of the Prairie	July 7, 1929	FBO	Synchronized score	Lost	
The Man and the Moment	July 7, 1929	First National	Part-talkie	Extant	
College Love	July 7, 1929	Universal	All-talkie	Lost	
Black Magic	July 7, 1929	Fox Film Corporation	Synchronized score	Lost	
Pleasure Crazed	July 7, 1929	Fox Film Corporation	All-talkie	Lost	
Thunder	July 8, 1929	MGM	Synchronized score	Incomplete	
The Time, the Place and the Girl	July 8, 1929	Warner Bros.	All-talkie	Audio-only	
Wonder of Women	July 13, 1929	MGM	Part-talkie	Audio-only	
Dangerous Curves	July 13, 1929	Paramount	All-talkie	Extant	
Masquerade	July 14, 1929	Fox Film Corporation	All-talkie	Lost	
Twin Beds	July 14, 1929	First National	All-talkie	Audio-only	
City of Play	July 15, 1929	Gainsborough Pictures	Part-talkie	Extant	
The Wrecker	July 17, 1929	Gainsborough Pictures / Tiffany-Stahl Productions	Part-talkie	Extant	
Modern Love	July 21, 1929	Universal	Part-talkie	Extant	
Melody Lane	July 21, 1929	Universal	All-talkie	Incomplete [Discs 1, 3, 5–8]	
Drag	July 21, 1929	First National	All-talkie	Extant	
The Last of Ms Cheyney	July 26, 1929	MGM	All-talkie	Extant	
Evangeline	July 27, 1929	United Artists	Synchronized score	Extant [Discs 1–2, 4–9]	
Blackmail (Note: The first all-talking feature film shot in the United Kingdom to be released.)	July 28, 1929	British International Pictures	All-talkie	Extant	
Port of Dreams	July 28, 1929	Universal	Part-talkie	Lost	
Smiling Irish Eyes	July 28, 1929	First National	All-talkie	Audio-only	
The Trail of '98 (Note: Silent version released on March 20, 1928.)	July 29, 1929	MGM	Synchronized score	Extant	
Midstream	July 29, 1929	Tiffany Pictures	Part-talkie	Incomplete	
Light Fingers	July 29, 1929	Columbia	All-talkie	Lost	
The Single Standard	July 29, 1929	MGM	Synchronized score	Extant	
Street Girl	July 30, 1929	RKO	All-talkie	Extant	
Number 17 (Note: Silent version released on September 20th, 1928.)	July 30, 1929	Felsom Film/ Gainsborough	Synchronized score	Extant	
Midnight Daddies	August 3, 1929	Sono Art-World Wide Pictures	All-talkie	Lost	
Hungarian Rhapsody (Note: Silent version released on November 5, 1928.)	August 3, 1929	Paramount / UFA	Synchronized score	Incomplete	
Paris Bound	August 3, 1929	Pathé	All-talkie	Extant	
The Cocoanuts	August 3, 1929	Paramount	All-talkie	Extant	
Chasing Through Europe	August 4, 1929	Fox Film Corporation	Synchronized score	Lost	
The Love Trap	August 4, 1929	Universal	Part-talkie	Extant	
Hard To Get	August 4, 1929	First National	All-talkie	Audio-only	
The College Coquette	August 5, 1929	Columbia	All-talkie	Extant	
Say It With Songs	August 6, 1929	Warner Bros.	All-talkie	Extant	
The Awful Truth	August 10, 1929	Pathé	All-talkie	Lost	
Half Marriage	August 10, 1929	RKO	All-talkie	Extant	
The Mysterious Dr. Fu Manchu	August 10, 1929	Paramount	All-talkie	Extant	
Dark Streets	August 11, 1929	First National	All-talkie	Audio-only	
The Dance of Life	August 16, 1929	Paramount	All-talkie	Extant	
Charming Sinners	August 17, 1929	Paramount	All-talkie	Extant	
Lucky in Love	August 17, 1929	Pathé	All-talkie	Lost	
Madame X	August 17, 1929	MGM	All-talkie	Extant	
Lucky Star	August 18, 1929	Fox Film Corporation	Part-talkie	Silent version only [Disc 4]	
Words and Music	August 18, 1929	Fox Film Corporation	All-talkie	Lost	
The Careless Age	August 18, 1929	First National	All-talkie	Audio-only [Discs 3–7]	
Hallelujah	August 20, 1929	MGM	All-talkie	Extant	
Marianne (Note: A silent version was produced first, before the film was remade in sound.)	August 24, 1929	MGM	All-talkie	Extant	
The Very Idea	August 24, 1929	RKO	All-talkie	Extant	
The Soul of France (Note: Silent version released on April 26, 1928.)	August 24, 1929	Paramount	Synchronized score	Lost	
Our Modern Maidens	August 24, 1929	MGM	Synchronized score	Extant	
The Sophomore	August 24, 1929	Pathé	All-talkie	Silent version only [Discs extant]	
Why Leave Home?	August 25, 1929	Fox Film Corporation	All-talkie	Lost	
Her Private Life	August 25, 1929	First National	All-talkie	Extant	
Gold Diggers of Broadway (Note: Several Technicolor fragments exist in various archives.)	August 29, 1929	Warner Bros.	All-talkie	Incomplete	
The Greene Murder Case	August 31, 1929	Paramount	All-talkie	Extant	
The Girl in the Show	August 31, 1929	MGM	All-talkie	Extant	
Auld Lang Syne	September 1, 1929	Welsh-Pearson	Synchronized score	Lost	
The Drake Case	September 1, 1929	Universal	All-talkie	Lost	
Fast Life	September 1, 1929	First National	All-talkie	Audio-only [Discs 1–3]	
Times Square	September 1, 1929	Lumas Film Corporation	Part-talkie	Audio-only [Disc 2 extant]	
Salute	September 1, 1929	Fox Film Corporation	All-talkie	Extant	
The End of the Simpletons (Note: The first 'all talking' film produced and released in Brazil.)	September 2, 1929	Syncrocinex	All-talkie	Incomplete	
Under the Greenwood Tree	September 5, 1929	British International Pictures	All-talkie	Lost	
Whispering Winds	September 5, 1929	Tiffany Pictures	Part-talkie	Lost	
Big News	September 7, 1929	Pathé	All-talkie	Extant	
Speedway	September 7, 1929	MGM	Synchronized score	Extant	
Big Time	September 7, 1929	Fox Film Corporation	All-talkie	Extant	
Fast Company	September 7, 1929	Paramount	All-talkie	Incomplete	
The Wagon Master	September 8, 1929	Universal	Part-talkie	Extant	
Side Street	September 8, 1929	RKO	All-talkie	Extant	
High Treason	September 9, 1929	Gaumont-British / Tiffany Pictures	All-talkie	Extant	
The Great Gabbo	September 12, 1929	Sono Art-World Wide Pictures	All-talkie	Extant	
Flight	September 13, 1929	Columbia	All-talkie	Extant	
The Unholy Night	September 14, 1929	MGM	All-talkie	Extant	
Hearts in Exile	September 14, 1929	Warner Bros.	All-talkie	Audio-only [Discs 6–9]	
Sailor's Holiday	September 14, 1929	Pathé	All-talkie	Extant	
Rio Rita	September 15, 1929	RKO	All-talkie	Incomplete [1932 Re-release only; and 2 song numbers from original, uncut]	
Hold Your Man	September 15, 1929	Universal	All-talkie	Extant	
The Great Divide	September 15, 1929	First National	All-talkie	Extant	
Three Live Ghosts	September 15, 1929	United Artists	All-talkie	Extant	
The American Prisoner	September 16, 1929	British International Pictures	All-talkie	Lost	
The Favourite of Schonbrunn	September 16, 1929	Bavaria Film	Part-talkie	Lost	
Happy Days (Note: The first feature film to be shot in Widescreen, in the Fox Grandeur 70mm film process.)	September 17, 1929	Fox Film Corporation	All-talkie	Full-screen only [70mm version lost]	
They Had to See Paris	September 18, 1929	Fox Film Corporation	All-talkie	Extant	
Honky Tonk	September 21, 1929	Warner Bros.	All-talkie	Audio-only	
Illusion	September 21, 1929	Paramount	All-talkie	Extant	
Wise Girls	September 21, 1929	MGM	All-talkie	Extant	
The Lady Lies	September 21, 1929	Paramount	All-talkie	Extant	
Barnum Was Right	September 22, 1929	Universal	All-talkie	Silent version only	
The Delightful Rogue	September 22, 1929	RKO	All-talkie	Extant	
The Girl from Havana	September 22, 1929	Fox Film Corporation	All-talkie	Lost	
A Most Immoral Lady	September 22, 1929	First National	All-talkie	Audio-only	
Jealousy	September 28, 1929	Paramount	All-talkie	Lost	
The Hottentot	September 28, 1929	Warner Bros.	All-talkie	Audio-only	
His Glorious Night	September 28, 1929	MGM	All-talkie	Extant	
Woman Trap	September 28, 1929	Paramount	All-talkie	Extant	
Her Private Affair	September 28, 1929	Pathé	All-talkie	Extant	
Tonight at Twelve	September 29, 1929	Universal	All-talkie	Lost	
The Isle of Lost Ships	September 29, 1929	First National	All-talkie	Extant (Mute Film Print); Soundtrack Lost	
Hurricane	September 30, 1929	Columbia	All-talkie	Extant	
The Plaything	September 30, 1929	British International Pictures	Part-talkie	Lost	
Land Without Women	September 30, 1929	Tobis	All-talkie	Lost	
The Broken Melody	October 1, 1929	Welsh-Pearson	Synchronized score	Lost	
White Cargo (Note: Silent version released in May 1929.)	October 1, 1929	Neo-Art Productions	Part-talkie	Extant	
The Devil's Maze	October 1, 1929	Gainsborough Pictures	All-talkie	Extant	
Dark Red Roses	October 1, 1929	British Talking Pictures	All-talkie	Extant	
Sunny Side Up	October 3, 1929	Fox Film Corporation	All-talkie	Extant	
Why Bring That Up?	October 4, 1929	Paramount	All-talkie	Extant	
The Argyle Case	October 5, 1929	Warner Bros.	All-talkie	Audio-only [Discs 3, 5, 7, 9]	
The Love Doctor	October 5, 1929	Paramount	All-talkie	Extant [Discs 1, 3, 5–6]	
Evidence	October 5, 1929	Warner Bros.	All-talkie	Audio-only	
The Trespasser	October 5, 1929	United Artists	All-talkie	Extant	
The Mysterious Island	October 5, 1929	MGM	Part-talkie	Extant	
One Hysterical Night	October 6, 1929	Universal	All-talkie	Extant	
Applause	October 7, 1929	Paramount	All-talkie	Extant	
Frozen Justice	October 13, 1929	Fox Film Corporation	All-talkie	Incomplete	
The Return of Sherlock Holmes	October 13, 1929	Paramount	All-talkie	Film-only	
The Last Performance	October 13, 1929	Universal	Part-talkie	Silent version only	
Artificial Svensson	October 14, 1929	AB Swedish Film Industry	Part-talkie	Extant	
Mister Antonio	October 15, 1929	Tiffany Pictures	All-talkie	Extant	
In Old California	October 15, 1929	Argosy Film Co.	All-talkie	Lost	
Howdy Broadway	October 16, 1929	Rayart Pictures	All-talkie	Extant	
So Long Letty	October 16, 1929	Warner Bros.	All-talkie	Extant	
Sea Fury	October 16, 1929	Universal	All-talkie	Lost	
The Informer	October 17, 1929	British International Pictures	Part-talkie	Extant	
Welcome Danger	October 19, 1929	Paramount	All-talkie	Extant	
The Thirteenth Chair	October 19, 1929	MGM	All-talkie	Extant	
Oh Yeah	October 19, 1929	Pathé	All-talkie	Extant	
Is Everybody Happy?	October 19, 1929	Warner Bros.	All-talkie	Incomplete	
Young Nowheres	October 20, 1929	First National	All-talkie	Audio-only	
The Phantom in the House	October 20, 1929	Continental Pictures	All-talkie	Extant	
The Cock-Eyed World	October 20, 1929	Fox Film Corporation	All-talkie	Extant	
The Queen's Necklace	October 22, 1929	Aubert Franco Film	Synchronized score	Lost	
In the Headlines	October 26, 1929	Warner Bros.	All-talkie	Audio-only [Discs 1–7]	
The Saturday Night Kid	October 26, 1929	Paramount	All-talkie	Extant	
Night Parade	October 27, 1929	RKO	All-talkie	Extant	
The Long Long Trail	October 27, 1929	Universal	All-talkie	Extant	
Married in Hollywood	October 27, 1929	Fox Film Corporation	All-talkie	Incomplete	
The Girl from Woolworth's	October 27, 1929	First National	All-talkie	Audio-only	
Atlantik (Note: The first 'all talking' German-language film.)	October 28, 1929	Sud Film / British International Pictures	All-talkie	Extant	
Jazz Heaven	October 30, 1929	RKO	All-talkie	Extant	
Alf's Carpet	November 1, 1929	British International Pictures	Part-talkie	Extant	
The Three Masks (Note: The first 'all talking' French-language film.)	November 1, 1929	Pathé-Natan	All-talkie	Extant	
Woman to Woman	November 1, 1929	Gainsborough Pictures / Tiffany-Stahl Productions	All-talkie	Extant	
To What Red Hell	November 1, 1929	Julius Hagen Productions	All-talkie	Extant	
Disraeli	November 1, 1929	Warner Bros.	All-talkie	Extant	
Sweetie	November 2, 1929	Paramount	All-talkie	Extant	
Skin Deep	November 2, 1929	Warner Bros.	All-talkie	International Sound Version [Audio-only]	
The Mississippi Gambler	November 3, 1929	Universal	All-talkie	Extant	
Love, Live and Laugh	November 3, 1929	Fox Film Corporation	All-talkie	Lost	
Condemned	November 3, 1929	United Artists	All-talkie	Extant	
Two O'Clock in the Morning	November 6, 1929	Bell Pictures Corporation	All-talkie	Lost	
Paris (Note: Fragments of footage were found in the BFI national archive.)	November 7, 1929	First National	All-talkie	Incomplete [Fragments]	
Footlights and Fools	November 8, 1929	First National	All-talkie	Audio-only	
So This Is College	November 8, 1929	MGM	All-talkie	Extant	
The Racketeer	November 9, 1929	Pathé	All-talkie	Extant	
The Sap	November 9, 1929	Warner Bros.	All-talkie	Audio-only	
The Virginian	November 9, 1929	Paramount	All-talkie	Extant	
A Song of Kentucky	November 10, 1929	Fox Film Corporation	All-talkie	Lost	
Señor Americano	November 10, 1929	Universal	Part-talkie	Silent version only	
Broadway Scandals	November 10, 1929	Columbia	All-talkie	Extant	
Tanned Legs	November 10, 1929	RKO	All-talkie	Extant	
The Forward Pass	November 10, 1929	First National	All-talkie	Audio-only	
Romance of the Rio Grande	November 11, 1929	Fox Film Corporation	All-talkie	Lost	
Song of Love	November 13, 1929	Columbia	All-talkie	Extant	
Those Who Love	November 15, 1929	British International Pictures	Part-talkie	Lost	
Acquitted	November 15, 1929	Columbia	All-talkie	Extant	
The Feather (Note: This film was produced in the United Kingdom by Julius Hagen Productions and distributed by United Artists.)	November 15, 1929	Julius Hagen Productions	Synchronized score	Lost	
Atlantic (Note: Also made in German, French, and silent versions. This was also the first all-talking German-language film to be released.)	November 15, 1929	British International Pictures	All-talkie	Extant	
The Mighty	November 16, 1929	Paramount	All-talkie	Extant	
The Locked Door	November 16, 1929	United Artists	All-talkie	Extant	
The Kiss (Note: The last dialogue free sound feature to be released by a 'major' Hollywood studio.)	November 16, 1929	MGM	Synchronized score	Extant	
Skinner Steps Out	November 17, 1929	Universal	All-talkie	Lost	
Little Johnny Jones	November 17, 1929	First National	All-talkie	Audio-only	
Shanghai Lady	November 17, 1929	Universal	All-talkie	Lost	
The Love Parade	November 19, 1929	Paramount	All-talkie	Extant	
Painted Faces	November 20, 1929	Tiffany Pictures	All-talkie	Extant	
The Show of Shows	November 21, 1929	Warner Bros.	All-talkie	B/W only [color incomplete]	
Untamed	November 23, 1929	MGM	All-talkie	Extant	
Darkened Rooms	November 23, 1929	Paramount	All-talkie	Extant	
Red Hot Rhythm	November 23, 1929	Pathé	All-talkie	Lost	
Overland Bound	November 23, 1929	Rayart Pictures	All-talkie	Lost	
Under the Southern Cross	November 24, 1929	Universal	Part-talkie	Silent version only	
The Sacred Flame	November 24, 1929	Warner Bros.	All-talkie	Audio-only	
Nix on Dames	November 24, 1929	Fox Film Corporation	All-talkie	Lost	
The Vagabond Lover	November 26, 1929	RKO	All-talkie	Extant	
The Battle of Paris	November 30, 1929	Paramount	All-talkie	Extant	
It's You I Have Loved	November 30, 1929	Aafa Film	All-talkie	Lost	
The Taming of the Shrew	November 30, 1929	United Artists	All-talkie	Extant	
The Hate Ship	December 1, 1929	British International Pictures	All-talkie	Extant	
The Talk of Hollywood	December 1, 1929	Sono Art-World Wide Pictures	All-talkie	Extant	
Wall Street	December 1, 1929	Columbia	All-talkie	Audio-only [Disc 6 extant]	
Seven Faces	December 1, 1929	Fox Film Corporation	All-talkie	Lost	
The Painted Angel	December 1, 1929	First National	All-talkie	Audio-only [Discs 1–6, 8]	
General Crack	December 3, 1929	Warner Bros.	All-talkie	Silent version only [Discs 1–11]	
It's a Great Life	December 6, 1929	MGM	All-talkie	Extant	
Rich People	December 7, 1929	Pathé	All-talkie	Extant	
Glorifying the American Girl	December 7, 1929	Paramount	All-talkie	Extant	
The Shannons of Broadway	December 8, 1929	Universal	All-talkie	Lost	
South Sea Rose	December 8, 1929	Fox Film Corporation	All-talkie	Lost	
The Love Racket	December 8, 1929	First National	All-talkie	Lost	
Dark Skies	December 10, 1929	Biltmore Productions	All-talkie	Lost	
Hell's Heroes	December 12, 1929	Universal	All-talkie	Extant	
This Thing Called Love	December 13, 1929	Pathé	All-talkie	Lost	
Dynamite	December 13, 1929	MGM	All-talkie	Extant	
Half Way to Heaven	December 14, 1929	Paramount	All-talkie	Extant	
The Aviator	December 14, 1929	Warner Bros.	All-talkie	Audio-only	
Christina	December 15, 1929	Fox Film Corporation	Part-talkie	Audio-only [Disc 2]	
After the Fog	December 15, 1929	Beacon Productions	All-talkie	Lost	
The Phantom of the Opera (Note: Silent version released on September 6, 1925)	December 15, 1929	Universal	Part-talkie	Extant [Disc 5]	
The Broadway Hoofer	December 15, 1929	Columbia	All-talkie	Extant [Discs 5, 7]	
Dance Hall	December 15, 1929	RKO	All-talkie	Extant	
Melody of the Heart	December 16, 1929	UFA	All-talkie	Extant	
Navy Blues	December 20, 1929	MGM	All-talkie	Extant	
The Lost Zeppelin	December 20, 1929	Tiffany Pictures	All-talkie	Extant	
The Marriage Playground	December 21, 1929	Paramount	All-talkie	Extant	
Pointed Heels	December 21, 1929	Paramount	All-talkie	Extant	
Tiger Rose	December 21, 1929	Warner Bros.	All-talkie	Extant	
Courtin' Wildcats	December 22, 1929	Universal	All-talkie	Extant	
Hot For Paris	December 22, 1929	Fox Film Corporation	All-talkie	Lost	
Splinters	December 23, 1929	British and Dominions Films	All-talkie	Extant	
Sally	December 23, 1929	First National	All-talkie	B/W only [color incomplete]	
The Night Belongs to Us	December 23, 1929	Froelich-Film GmbH	All-talkie	Extant	
Hit the Deck	December 25, 1929	RKO	All-talkie	Audio-only	
Seven Keys to Baldplate	December 25, 1929	RKO	All-talkie	Extant	
Mexicali Rose	December 26, 1929	Columbia	All-talkie	Extant	
Say It with Music	December 26, 1929	Minerva Film	Part-talkie	Film-only	
The Co-Optimists	December 27, 1929	Gordon Craig Productions	All-talkie	Lost	
Their Own Desire	December 27, 1929	MGM	All-talkie	Extant	
Devil-May-Care	December 27, 1929	MGM	All-talkie	Extant	
His First Command	December 28, 1929	Pathé	All-talkie	Extant	
The Laughing Lady	December 28, 1929	Paramount	All-talkie	Extant	
New York Nights	December 28, 1929	United Artists	All-talkie	Extant	
Seven Days Leave	December 28, 1929	Paramount	All-talkie	Extant	
The Royal Box (Note: The first foreign-language talkie to be made in the United States.)	December 29, 1929	Warner Bros. / National-Filmverleih GmbH	All-talkie	Lost	
Wedding Rings	December 29, 1929	First National	All-talkie	Lost	
Blaze o' Glory	December 30, 1929	Sono Art-World Wide Pictures	All-talkie	Audio-only	
The Bishop Murder Case	December 31, 1929	MGM	All-talkie	Extant	

== See also ==
- List of early Warner Bros. sound and talking features
- Vitaphone
- Movietone
- RCA Photophone
- Sound Film
