= Riley the Cop =

1928 film directed by John Ford

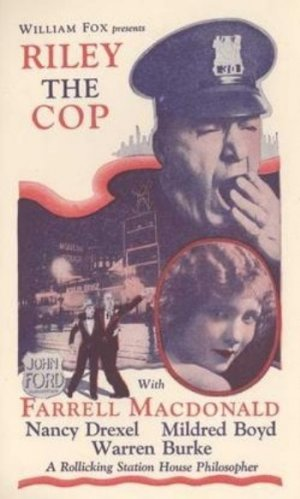
- Advertisement
- Directed by: John Ford (uncredited)
- Written by: Fred Stanley; James Gruen
- Produced by: John Ford
- Starring: J. Farrell MacDonald; Nancy Drexel
- Cinematography: Charles G. Clarke
- Edited by: Alex Troffey
- Production company: Fox Film Corporation
- Distributed by: Fox Film Corporation
- Release date: November 25, 1928
- Running time: 68 minutes
- Country: United States
- Languages: Sound (Synchronized) (English intertitles)

Riley the Cop (1928)

Riley the Cop is a 1928 American synchronized sound comedy film directed by John Ford. While the film has no audible dialog, it was released with a synchronized musical score with sound effects using the sound-on-film movietone process.

== Plot ==
James “Aloysius” Riley has been a beat cop in his New York neighborhood for 20 years without making an arrest. He is liked by the children on his block and is known for bending the rules. He plays baseball with the boys, flirts with the kitchen maids, and chases petty crooks over into the neighboring beat so that his rival, Hans “Eitel” Krausmeyer, has to deal with them instead. Krausmeyer has a military bearing and focuses on discipline, contrasting with Riley's approach.

One young man on Riley’s beat is Davy Collins, who works at a local bakery and is in love with sweet Mary Coronelli. Mary’s wealthy, snobbish Aunt Caroline disapproves of the romance and whisks Mary off on an extended trip to Europe, hoping to end the relationship. Determined not to lose her, Davy scrapes together his savings to follow her abroad. But before he leaves, the bakery discovers a shortage in its cash accounts, and suspicion falls on him.

The police department assigns Riley to go to Europe, find Davy, and bring him back for questioning. Though Riley knows the boy and believes in his innocence, duty is duty.

Riley’s first stop is Munich, where the culture — and the beer — quickly distract him from his mission. In a lively beer garden, he meets Lena Krausmeyer, a buxom and flirtatious German waitress with a tow-colored wig. Riley is smitten, and a series of comic courtship gags follow, including a face-making contest between Riley and Lena that has the whole beer hall in stitches.

It’s not until Riley receives a telegram from New York reminding him to “bring home the prisoner” that he reluctantly gets back on the trail. He discovers that Lena is none other than the sister of his old beat rival, Krausmeyer — a fact that amuses him but also slightly dampens his romantic ambitions.

Riley finally catches up with Davy in Paris, but instead of putting him in irons, the good-natured cop all but lets the young man escort him back. In Paris there’s more comic business — Billy Bevan appears as an excitable taxi driver who gets caught up in Riley’s antics, and Riley’s attempts to keep both Davy and himself out of trouble lead to a few misunderstandings in cafés and hotel lobbies.

As they sail for home, Riley and Lena enjoy a bittersweet farewell on deck. Mid-voyage, a cable arrives from New York exonerating Davy: the real culprit in the bakery theft has been caught. This clears the way for Davy and Mary to reunite happily, while Riley, good-hearted as ever, tips his hat to the young couple and turns his attention back to his own beat — perhaps with thoughts of a return trip to Europe and Lena.

The film closes with the same genial tone it began with: Riley, back in uniform, playfully shooing kids off Krausmeyer’s side of the street, grinning as the neighborhood life resumes as if he’d never been away.

== Cast ==
- J. Farrell MacDonald as James "Aloysius" Riley (as Farrell Macdonald)
- Nancy Drexel as Mary Coronelli
- David Rollins as David "Davy" Collins
- Louise Fazenda as Lena Krausmeyer
- Billy Bevan as Paris Cabman (uncredited)
- Mildred Boyd as Caroline (uncredited)
- Mike Donlin as Crook (uncredited)
- Otto Fries as Munich Cabman (uncredited)
- Dell Henderson as Judge Coronelli (uncredited)
- Isabelle Keith as French Woman on Pier (uncredited)
- Robert Parrish as Boy (uncredited)
- Russ Powell as Mr. Kuchendorf (uncredited)
- Harry Schultz as Hans "Eitel" Krausmeyer (uncredited)
- Ferdinand Schumann-Heink as Julius Kuchendorf (uncredited)
- Rolfe Sedan as French Restaurant Patron (uncredited)
- Harry Semels as French Policeman (uncredited)
- Tom Wilson as Sergeant (uncredited)

== See also ==
- List of early sound feature films (1926–1929)
