= The Air Circus =

1928 film

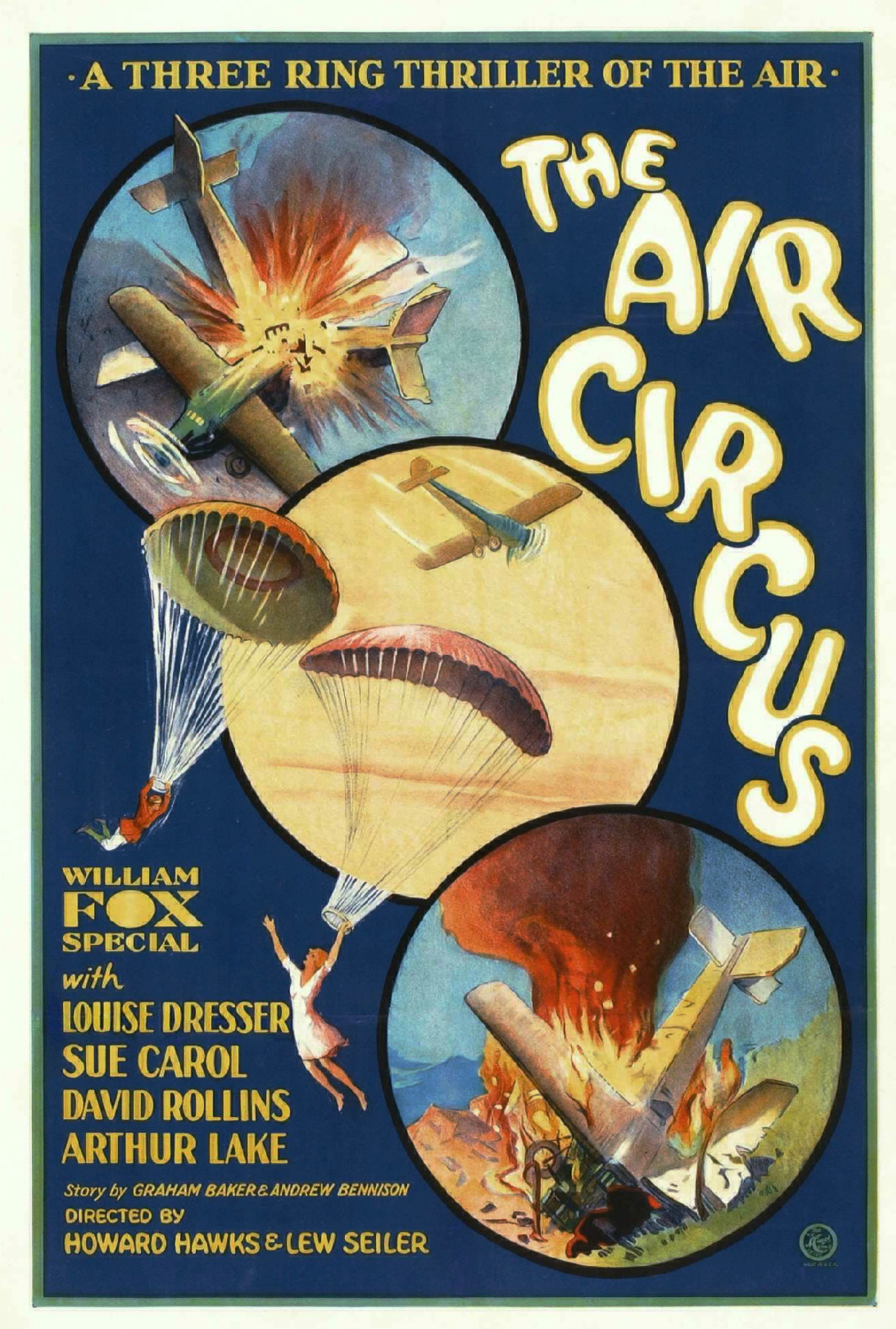
- Film poster
- Directed by: Howard Hawks; Lewis Seiler
- Written by: Norman Z. McLeod; Seton I. Miller
- Starring: Arthur Lake; Sue Carol; David Rollins; Louise Dresser
- Cinematography: Daniel B. Clark
- Production company: Fox Film Corporation
- Distributed by: Fox Film Corporation
- Release date: September 30, 1928 (US)
- Running time: 118 min.
- Country: United States
- Languages: Sound (Part-Talkie); English

The Air Circus is a 1928 American sound part-talkie drama film directed by Howard Hawks and Lewis Seiler and starring Arthur Lake, Sue Carol, David Rollins, and Louise Dresser. It is the first of Hawks's aviation films. The film featured a talking sequence that lasted about 15 minutes with the rest of the film being synchronized with a musical score with sound effects. The soundtrack was recorded using the sound-on-film Movietone process. The film is notable as the first aviation oriented film with dialogue. (Note: The Air Circus was the first film depicting the barnstormer era.)

== Plot ==
In Ypsilanti, Michigan, Speed Doolittle, the brash Don Juan of the town, and Buddy Blake, a more serious and modest youth, spend their days tinkering with a rickety homemade glider mounted on a battered car. Their dream is to become real aviators.

Mrs. Blake, a war widow who lost her elder son, Lieutenant Blake, in World War I, is hesitant to let Buddy go to aviation school. Memories of her first son’s sacrifice weigh heavily, but she finally gives in. Meanwhile, Speed takes leave of Ypsilanti, showered with farewell kisses from several girlfriends.

The two head west to the Pacific School of Aviation, run by Charles Manning and his sister Sue Manning. Sue, though modest about her skills at first, is an experienced aviatrix and instructor. Around the hangars, comic mishaps come courtesy of mechanic Jerry McSwiggin.

Both boys throw themselves into training. Speed Doolittle quickly proves a natural in the air. Buddy Blake, while enthusiastic, is daunted by his first passenger flight. He forces himself to look over the side, marveling at the miniature landscape far below.

Disaster strikes when Speed’s impulsive flying nearly collides with Buddy’s practice plane. Buddy swerves to avoid him and crashes. He is unhurt but deeply shaken, and his confidence is gone. Convinced he’s a coward, he refuses to fly again, remaining at the school as a ground mechanic.

Sensing trouble, Mrs. Blake travels to the school. She finds her son Buddy Blake alone, emotionally crushed. In this early Movietone dialogue scene, she comforts him, urging him to give up flying. Buddy promises her he will never take to the air again. Downstairs, other students and instructors are laughing and dancing with their sweethearts, a sharp contrast to the tearful exchange above.

Soon after, Sue Manning and Speed Doolittle take off together. During takeoff, the plane’s landing gear is ripped away — but they don’t realize it. On the ground, Buddy Blake spots the danger. Forgetting his promise and his fear, he pleads with Mrs. Blake to let him fly after them. She hesitates, then nods.

Buddy jumps into a plane and roars into the sky. Speed sees him waving from another aircraft, assuming it’s just Buddy’s excitement at being airborne again. Buddy maneuvers beneath them to prevent a landing until he can make the danger clear. Sue finally understands; she climbs onto the wing and parachutes to safety. Speed follows suit, leaping after her.

With the others safe, Buddy Blake lands his own plane smoothly — his fear gone forever. Sue Manning and Speed Doolittle congratulate him, and Mrs. Blake embraces her son. The film closes on Buddy’s exultant cry: “I can fly — I can fly!”, the triumphant end title punctuating his victory over fear.

== Cast ==
- Arthur Lake as "Speed" Doolittle
- Sue Carol as Sue Manning
- David Rollins as Buddy Blake
- Louise Dresser as Mrs. Blake
- Heinie Conklin as Jerry McSwiggin
- Charles Delaney as Charles Manning
- Earl Robinson as Lt. Blake
- Virginia Cherrill as Extra (uncredited)

== Music ==
The film featured a theme song entitled "High Up In The Sky" composed by Edward Pala and Edward Brandt. Also featured on the soundtrack was the song entitled "Sweet Sue - Just You" which was written by Victor Young and Will J. Harris.

== Production ==
The Air Circus is Hawks' seventh feature, and the first with sound dialog. The film was completely finished as a silent when the studio commissioned dialog from screenwriter F. Hugh Herbert and assigned Lewis Seiler to insert 15 minutes of talking footage, which Hawks considered "mawkish".

Principal photography took place from April to June 1928 at Clover Field, Santa Monica, California. Stunt pilot Dick Grace did most of the flying with Travel Air and Swallow biplanes featured.

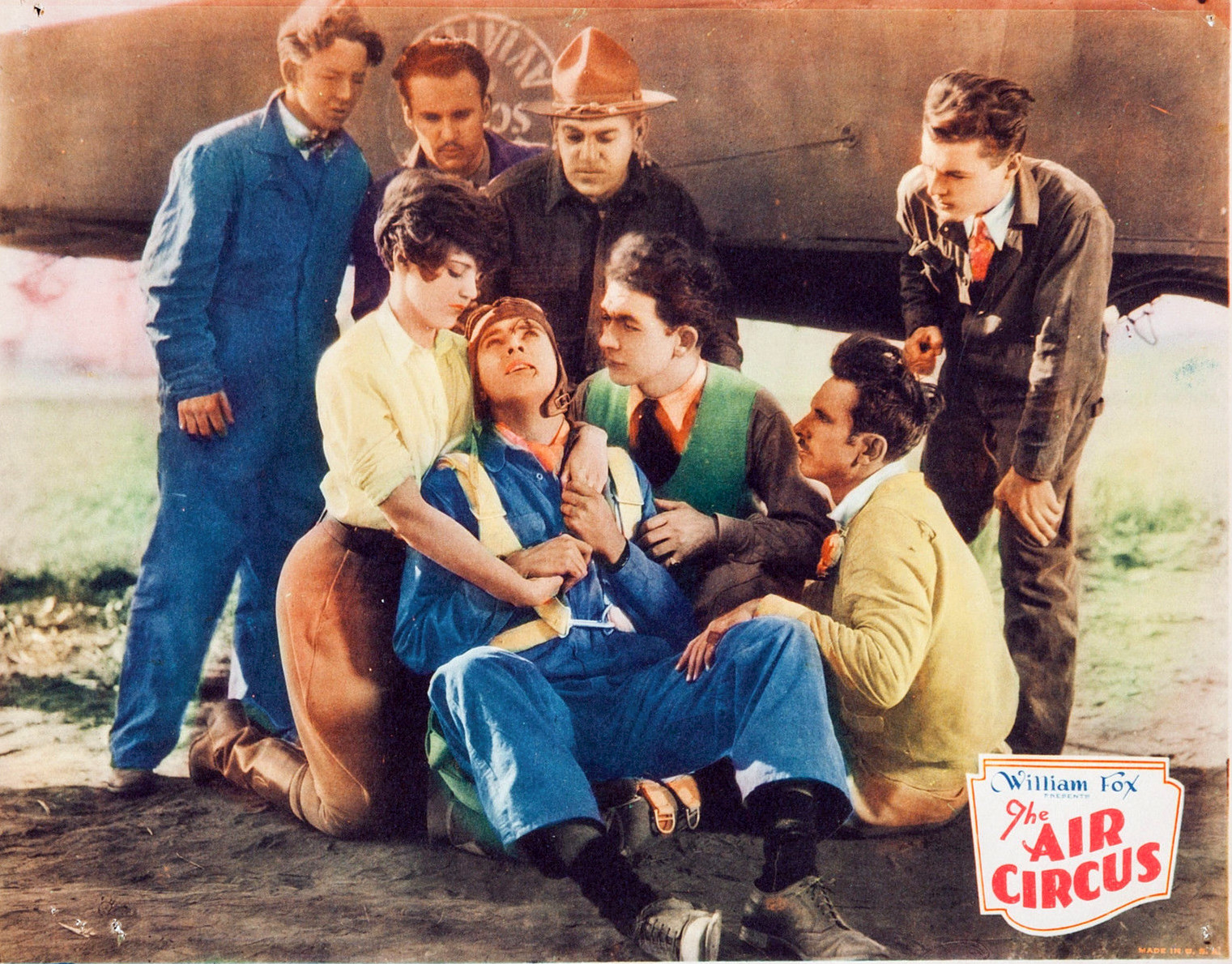
Lobby card

== Reception ==
The Air Circus received generally positive reviews from critics. Mordaunt Hall of The New York Times called it "a jolly, wholesome and refreshingly human picture", praising David Rollins' acting as "wonderfully natural."

The Film Daily said the film was well-acted with "a bang-up youth cast from all angles" and a "thrill finish." Oliver Claxton of The New Yorker wrote that the talking sequence was "the most unfortunate scene", but that the rest of the film "should amuse you in a quiet way." Variety was more modest in its praise, writing, "Expert direction has managed to make a fairly interesting lightweight number out of a script that holds nothing but background and a plot that doesn't exist."

== Preservation status ==
Various sources classify it as lost. However, Hal Erickson states the silent version "was rescued from oblivion in the early 1970s".

== See also ==
- List of early sound feature films (1926–1929)
