= Morals for Women =

1931 film by Mort Blumenstock

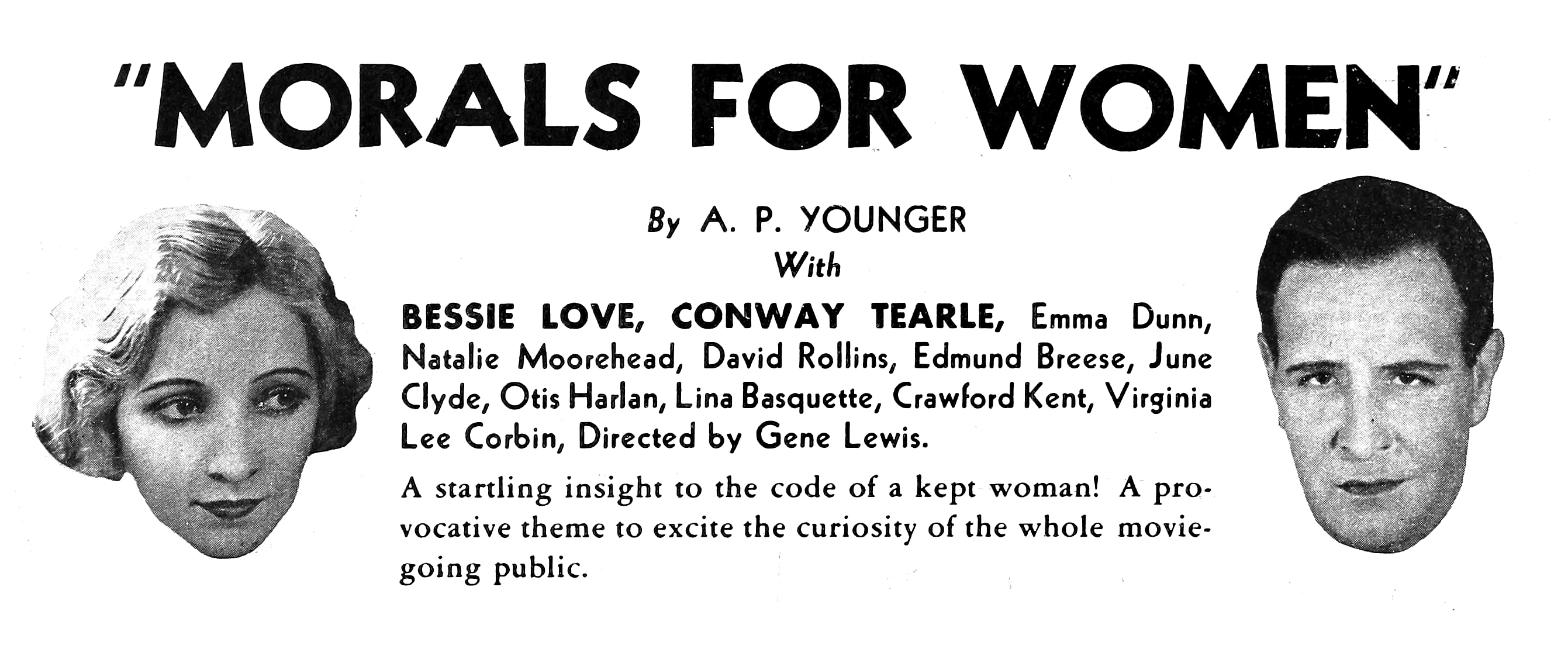
- Magazine advertisement
- Directed by: Mort Blumenstock
- Written by: Frances Hyland
- Produced by: Phil Goldstone
- Starring: Bessie Love; Conway Tearle
- Cinematography: Max Dupont
- Edited by: Martin G. Cohn
- Distributed by: Tiffany Pictures
- Release date: October 25, 1931 (U.S.)
- Running time: 65 minutes
- Country: United States
- Language: English

Morals for Women (known in the UK as Farewell Party and in re-release as Big City Interlude) is a 1931 American pre-Code film produced and released by Tiffany Pictures, often considered a low budget studio. The film stars Bessie Love and Conway Tearle. It is preserved by the Library of Congress, has been released on DVD, and is in the public domain. It was originally rejected by the British Board of Film Censors, but was later passed with cuts for an A certificate.

This film is a follow-up to Tiffany's 1925 silent Morals for Men, which also starred Conway Tearle and is also preserved at the Library of Congress.

== Plot ==
Stenographer and gold digger Helen Huston has a personal relationship with her employer Van Dyne, who has set her up in an apartment on Park Avenue. Her childhood beau visits New York and proposes to her, which prompts her to return to her hometown and seek advice from her family. News of her living situation is the talk of her hometown. In defending Helen's honor, her younger brother injures the town bully and must pay his large hospital bill. Helen returns to her New York boss to get the money. Her hometown sweetheart interrupts one of her parties to see her, and even upon learning about Helen's relationship with her boss, he wants to marry her.

== Cast ==
- Bessie Love as Helen Huston
- Conway Tearle as Van Dyne
- John Holland as Paul Cooper
- Natalie Moorhead as Flora
- Emma Dunn as Mrs. Huston
- June Clyde as Lorraine Huston
- Edmund Breese as Mr. Huston
- David Rollins as Bill Huston
- Lina Basquette as Claudia
- Virginia Lee Corbin as Maybelle
- Crauford Kent as Mr. Marston
- Otis Harlan as Mr. Johnston
- George Olsen as orchestra leader (uncredited)
- Wilbur Higby (uncredited)
- Lillian Rich (uncredited)

== Reception ==
The film received lukewarm reviews, and the morality of the story was questioned.
