= The Phantom Express (1932 film) =

1932 film by Emory Johnson

- Movie Lobby Card
- Directed by: Emory Johnson
- Written by: Laird Doyle Screenplay; Emory Johnson Story
- Produced by: Irving C. Franklin; Emory Johnson; Donald M. Stoner
- Starring: William Collier, Jr.; Sally Blane
- Cinematography: Ross Fisher
- Edited by: S. Roy Luby
- Production company: Emory Johnson Productions
- Distributed by: Majestic Pictures
- Release date: August 15, 1932
- Running time: 6 reels 70 minutes
- Country: United States
- Language: English

The Phantom Express is a 1932 American pre-Code mystery crime-drama directed by Emory Johnson and based on the Emory Johnson story. The film stars William Collier, Jr. as Bruce Harrington, Sally Blane as Carolyn Nolan and Hobart Bosworth as Mr. Harrington. It was commercially released on August 15, 1932, by Majestic Pictures.

== Plot ==
Railroad engineer D.J. 'Smokey' Nolan ( J. Farrell MacDonald) drives his locomotive at full speed when he spies an oncoming train directly in his path. He quickly applies the emergency brakes, causing the train to derail when it tries to stop; as a result; several passengers are killed. An investigation cannot find any trace of the oncoming train that caused the derailment. Smokey is fired for negligence.

Smokey has a daughter, Carolyn ( Sally Blane). The CEO of the Southwest Pacific Railroad, Mr. Harrington (Hobart Bosworth), has a playboy son Bruce ( William Collier, Jr.).

Because of the derailment and other ill fortunes, Mr. Harrington has decided to sell the railroad for a fraction of its worth. He will sign the papers at midnight. In the meantime, Bruce meets Carolyn and finds out she is the daughter of the fired engineer. They instantly bond, then decide to set out together and solve the mystery of the phantom express.

Bruce and Carolyn discover that the president of a rival railroad company (Huntley Gordon) has intentionally caused all of the accidents on the Southwest Pacific Railroad to drive the stock price down. After the stock plummets, the rival president figures he can buy all of the railroad's rolling stock at a reduced price. This is unearthed just hours before Mr. Harrington plans to sign the railroad over. Bruce tries to telegraph his father, but a storm has hampered all forms of communication.

The only way Bruce can advise his father not to sign the papers is to fire-up train number 101, bring Smokey Nolan and his fireman out of retirement, and return to the central office to prevent his father from signing. The train travels through the storm-savaged countryside encountering floods and landslides. Bruce arrives as his father prepares to sign and exposes the plot by the rival railroad, including how the purchasers constructed a piece of equipment and disguised it like an engine with headlights. They placed it on a nearby track causing Smokey to think he was heading towards a collision with an oncoming train.

Over the course of their investigation, Bruce and Carolyn fall in love and decide to get married. After their wedding, they honeymoon on the train.

== Cast ==
| Actor | Role |
|---|---|
| William Collier, Jr. | Bruce Harrington |
| Sally Blane | Carolyn Nolan |
| J. Farrell MacDonald | D.J. 'Smokey' Nolan |
| Hobart Bosworth | Mr. Harrington |
| Axel Axelson | Axel, the fireman |
| Lina Basquette | Betty |
| Eddie Phillips | Dick Walsh (posing as Bruce) |
| Robert Ellis | Reynolds |
| Claire McDowell | Ma Nolan |
| David Rollins | Jackie Nolan |
| Tom O'Brien | Red Connelly Telegraph Operator |
| Huntley Gordon | President of a rival railroad company |
| Brady Kline | Slim - a henchman |
| Jack Pennick | Bubba - a henchman |
| Jack Mower | a gang leader |
| Allan Forrest | a henchman |

== Production ==
The main theme of the plot bears a close similarity to The Ghost Train (play), a movie version of which was produced in England the previous year, viz. The Ghost Train, but that source is not acknowledged in the credits. There was a prior silent American film also entitled The Phantom Express (1925), which may also have been influenced although uncredited by the original play. The film is sometimes confused with the earlier film with the same name. The earlier version, released in November 1925 starred Ethel Shannon and George Periolat.

The film is a talkie and was the last Hollywood film to be directed by Emory Johnson.

== Preservation status ==
The Phantom Express was the first film in Emory Johnson's contract with Majestic Pictures. The film is also Emory Johnson's second talkie. The film's original length is listed at 6 reels. Emory Johnson directed 13 films, of which 11 were silent, and 2 were talkies.

This movie can be viewed on YouTube.

== Gallery ==
=== Principal Players ===
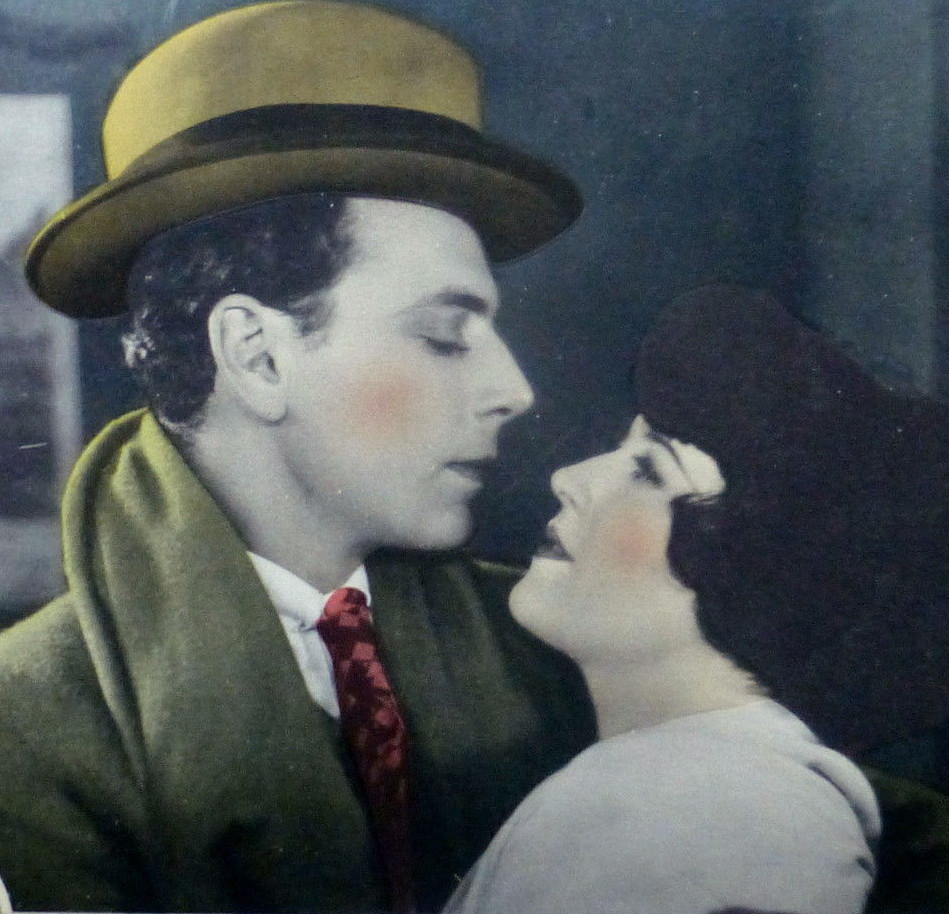
William Collier, Jr.
Bruce Harrington

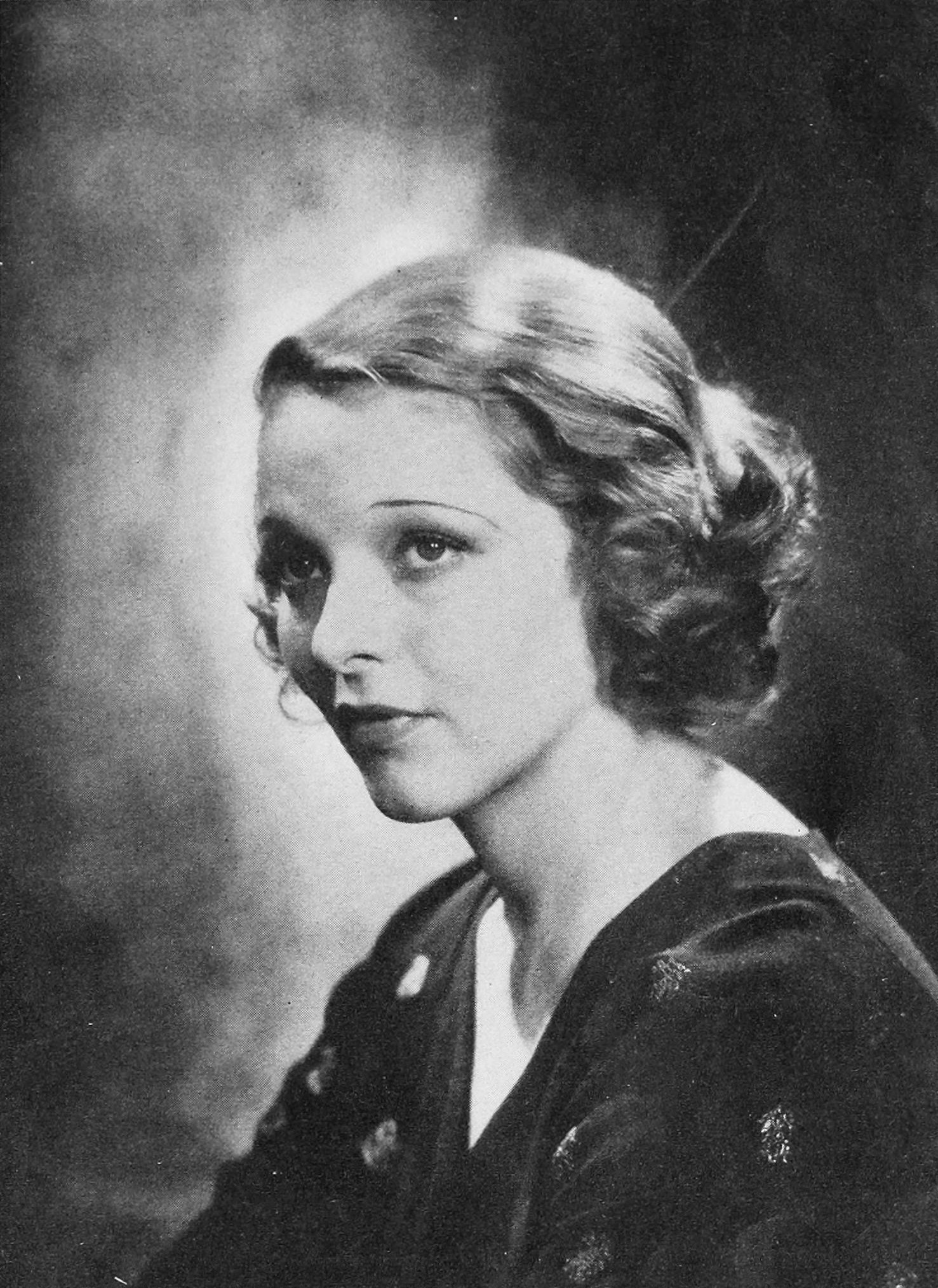
Sally Blane
Carolyn Nolan

Hobart Bosworth
Mr. Harrington

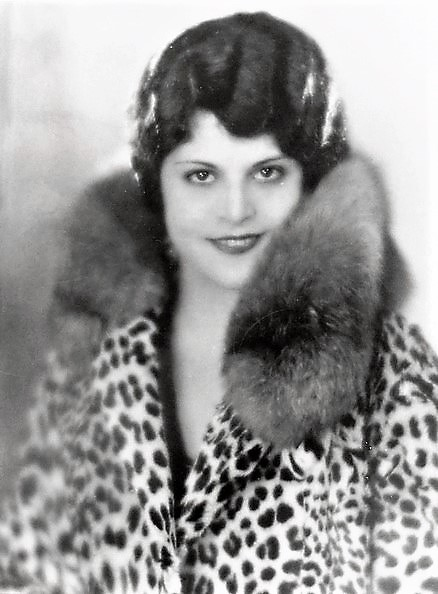
Lina Basquette
Betty

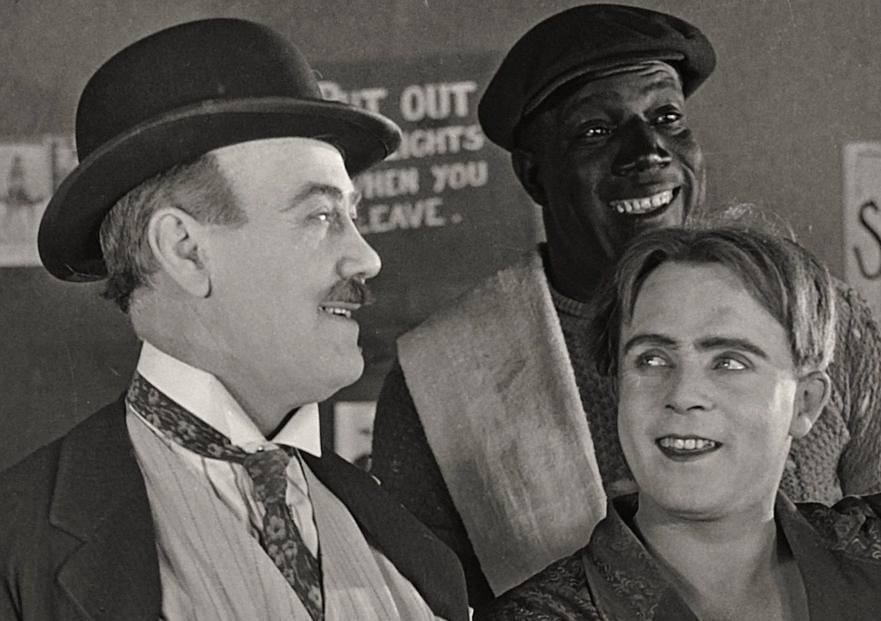
Tom O'Brien
Red Connelly Telegraph Operator

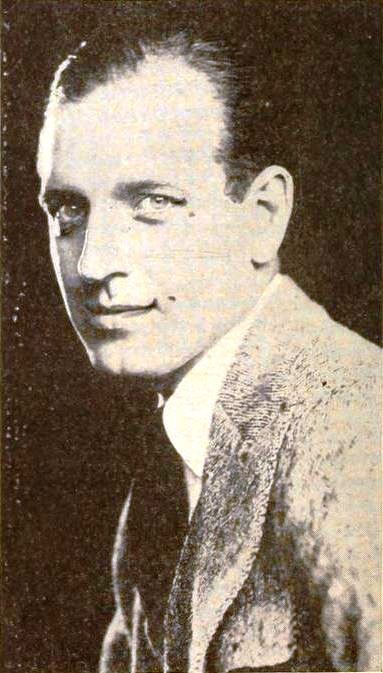
Robert Ellis
Reynolds

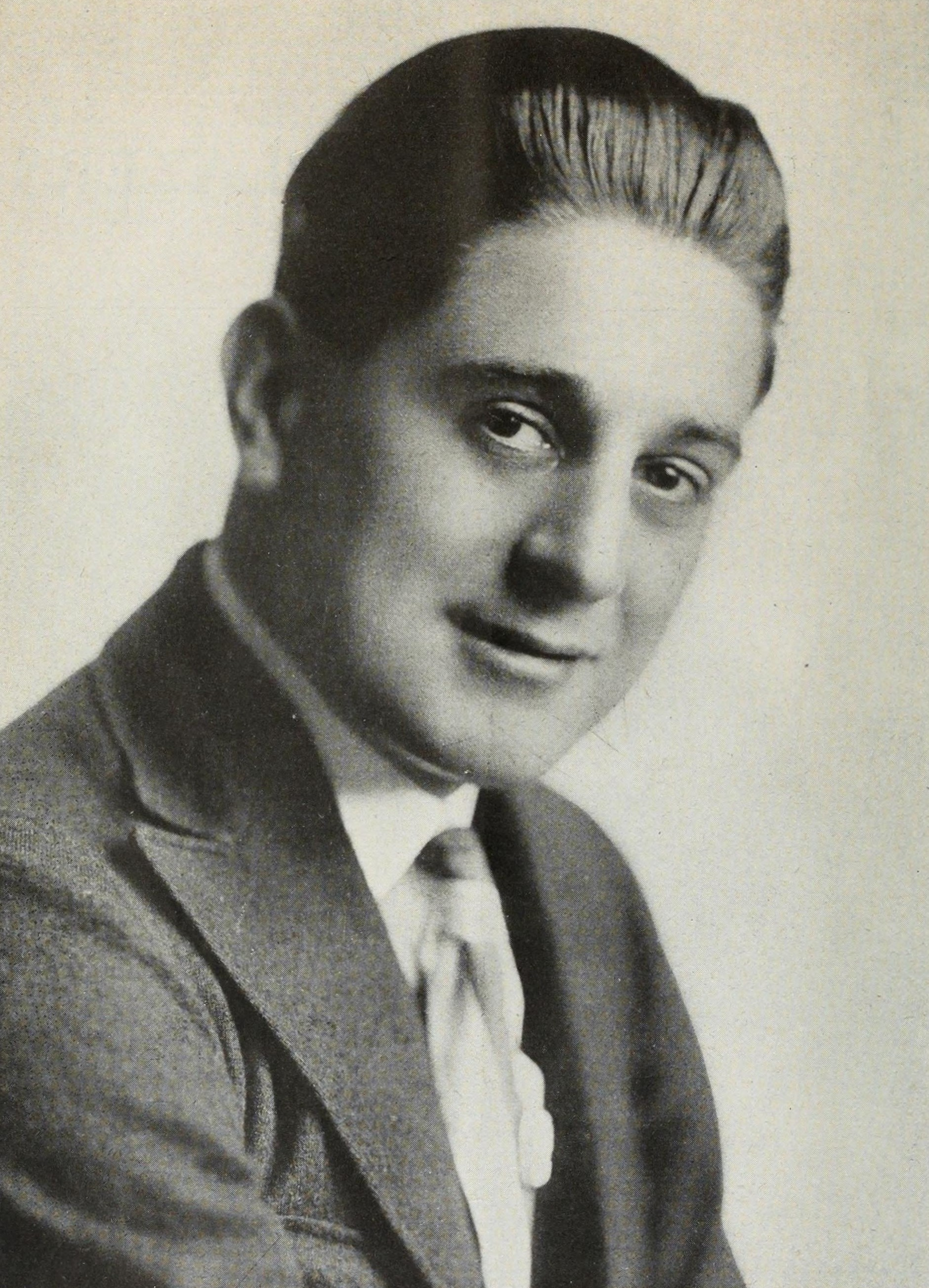
Allan Forrest
a henchman

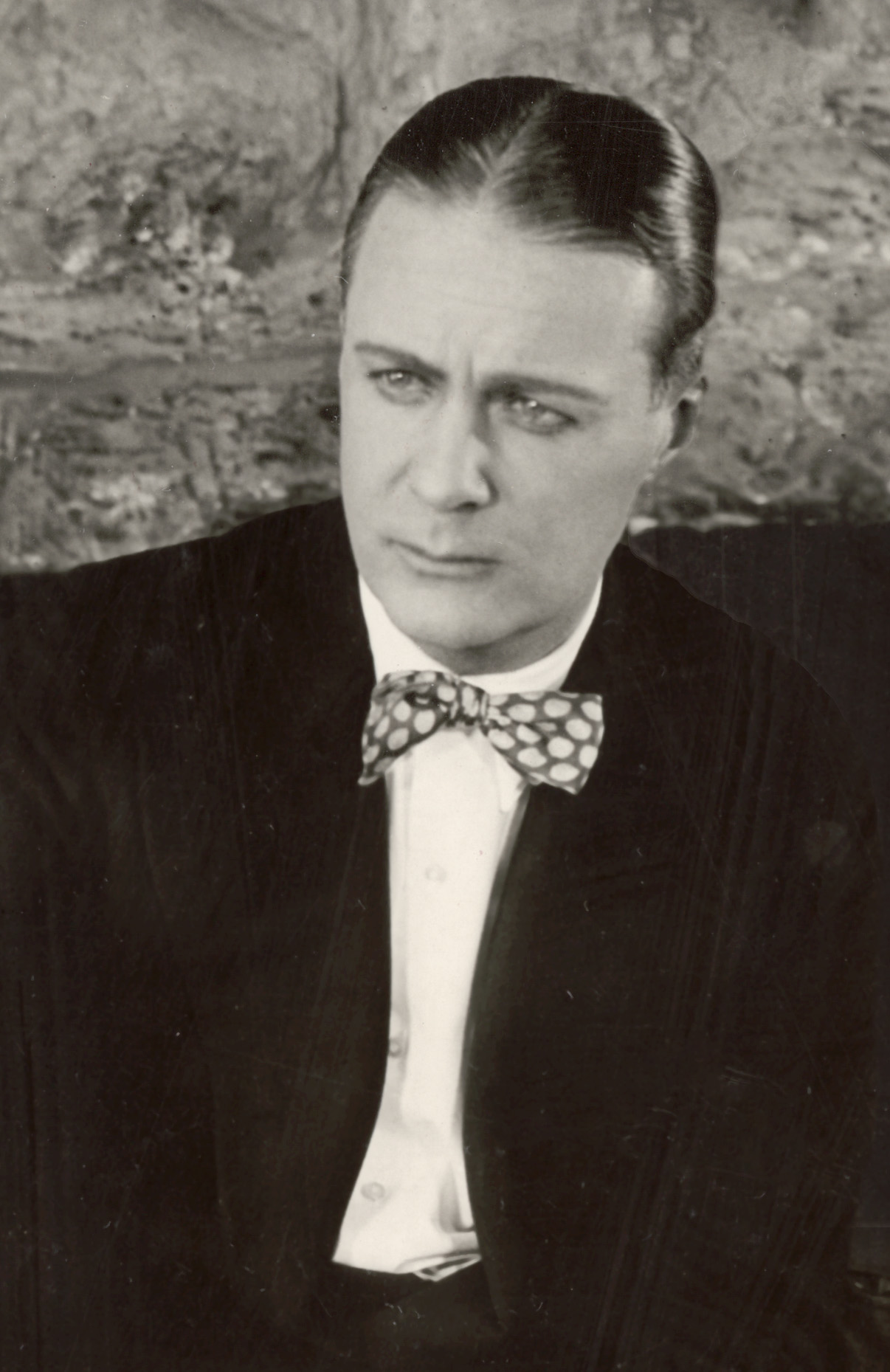
Huntley Gordon
President of a rival railroad company
