= My Weakness (film) =

1933 film by David Butler

- Directed by: David Butler
- Written by: Buddy G. DeSylva; Bert Hanlon; David Butler; Ben Ryan
- Produced by: Buddy G. DeSylva
- Starring: Lilian Harvey; Lew Ayres; Charles Butterworth; Harry Langdon
- Cinematography: Arthur C. Miller
- Edited by: Irene Morra
- Music by: Arthur Lange; Cyril J. Mockridge
- Production company: Fox Film Corporation
- Distributed by: Fox Film Corporation
- Release date: September 22, 1933
- Running time: 73 minutes
- Country: United States
- Language: English

My Weakness is a 1933 American pre-Code musical film directed by David Butler and starring Lilian Harvey, Lew Ayres and Charles Butterworth. It was the second of four films made by the British-German actress Harvey in Hollywood, who had emerged as major star during Weimar Germany.

It both was and wasn't the first mainstream Hollywood film to use the word "gay" as a descriptor of homosexuality. In one scene, Charles Butterworth and Sid Silvers commiserate over their miserable, hopeless shared love for Lilian Harvey, until Butterworth is struck by a solution: "Let's be gay!" However, the Studio Relations Committee censors decreed that the line had to be muffled.

== Plot ==
A wealthy young man bets that he can turn a cleaning woman into a sophisticated lady and trick three men into wanting to marry her.

== Cast ==
- Lilian Harvey as Looloo Blake
- Lew Ayres as Ronnie Gregory
- Charles Butterworth as Gerald Gregory
- Harry Langdon as Dan Cupid
- Sid Silvers as Maxie
- Irene Bentley as Jane Holman
- Henry Travers as Ellery Gregory
- Adrian Rosley as Baptiste
- Mary Howard as Diana Griffith
- Irene Ware as Eve Millstead
- Barbara Weeks as Lois Crowley
- Susan Fleming as Jacqueline Wood
- Marcelle Edwards as Marion
- Marjorie King as Lillian
- Jean Allen as Consuello
- Gladys Blake as Mitzi
- Dixie Francis as Dixie

== Bibliography ==
- Solomon, Aubrey. The Fox Film Corporation, 1915-1935: A History and Filmography. McFarland, 2011.
