= Love, Live and Laugh =

1929 film

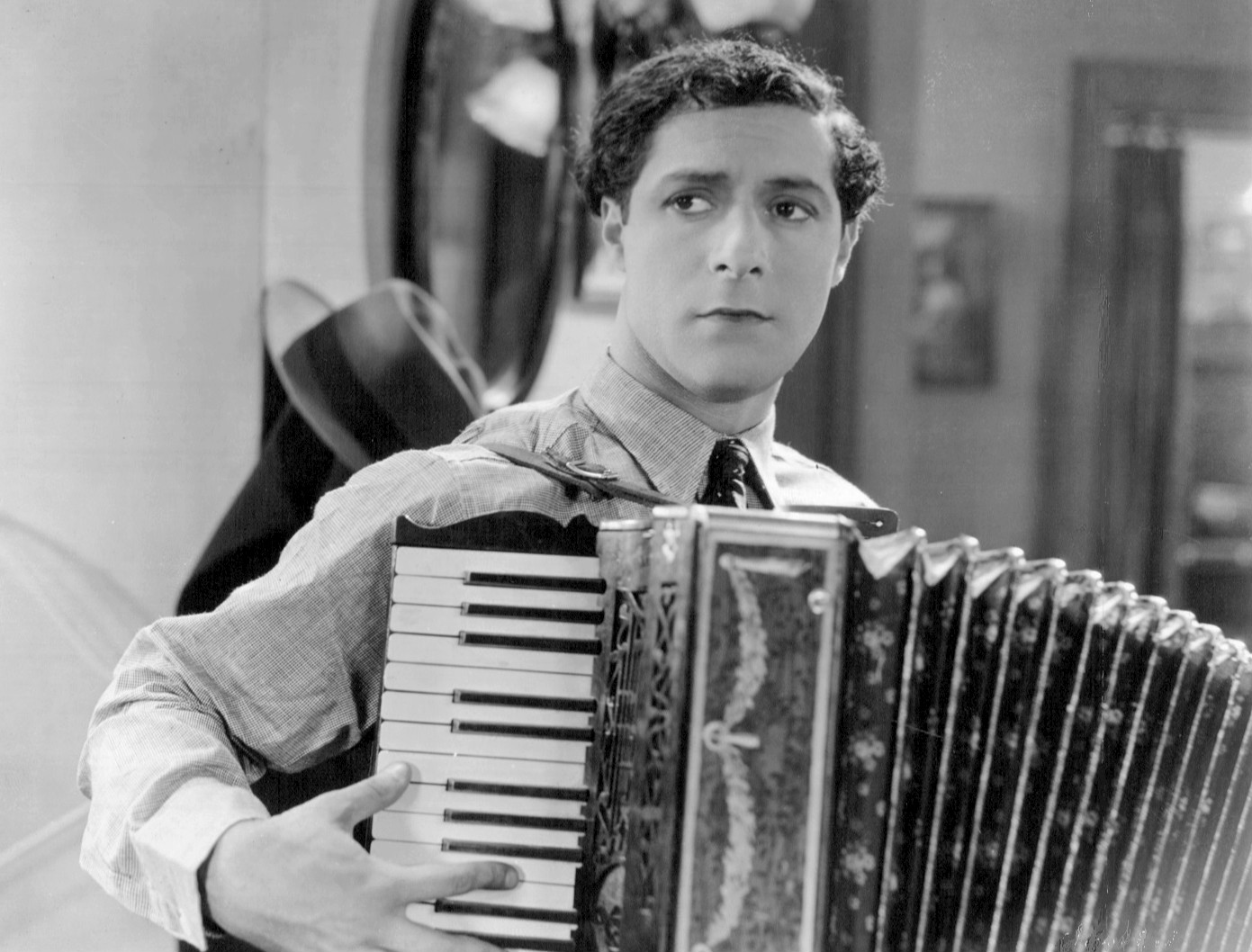
- Still with George Jessel
- Directed by: William K. Howard
- Screenplay by: Edwin J. Burke; Dana Burnet; George Jessel
- Based on: The Hurdy-Gurdy Man by: Leroy Clemens; John B. Hymer
- Starring: George Jessel; Lila Lee; David Rollins; Henry Kolker; John Loder; John Reinhardt
- Cinematography: Lucien Andriot
- Edited by: Alfred DeGaetano
- Production company: Fox Film Corporation
- Distributed by: Fox Film Corporation
- Release date: November 3, 1929
- Running time: 81 minutes
- Country: United States
- Language: English

Love, Live and Laugh is a 1929 American sound (All-Talking) drama film directed by William K. Howard and written by Edwin J. Burke, Dana Burnet, and George Jessel. It is based on the 1922 play The Hurdy-Gurdy Man by Leroy Clemens and John B. Hymer. The film stars George Jessel, Lila Lee, David Rollins, Henry Kolker, John Loder, and John Reinhardt. The film was released on November 3, 1929, by Fox Film Corporation.

== Cast ==
- George Jessel as Luigi
- Lila Lee as Margharita
- David Rollins as Pasquale Gallupi
- Henry Kolker as Enrico
- John Loder as Dr. Price
- John Reinhardt as Mario
- Dick Winslow as Mike
- Henry Armetta as Tony
- Marcia Manon as Sylvia
- Jerry Mandy as Barber

== See also ==
- List of early sound feature films (1926–1929)
