= David Butler (director) =

American actor and director (1894–1979)

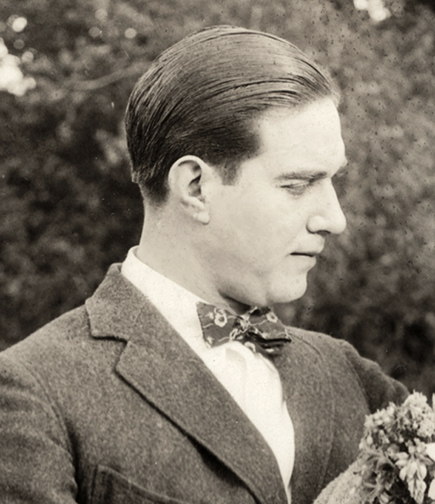
- Butler in Better Times (1919)
- Born: December 17, 1894; San Francisco, California, U.S.
- Died: June 14, 1979 (aged 84); Arcadia, California, U.S.
- Occupations: Actor, film director, film producer, screenwriter, television director
- Years active: 1910–1967

David Butler (December 17, 1894 – June 14, 1979) was an American actor, film director, film producer, screenwriter, and television director.

== Biography ==
Butler was born in San Francisco, California. His mother was actress Adele Belgrade, and his father was actor and director Fred J. Butler. His first acting roles were playing extras in stage plays. He later appeared in two D.W. Griffith films: The Girl Who Stayed Home and The Greatest Thing in Life. He also appeared in the 1927 Academy Award-winning film 7th Heaven.

The same year, Butler made his directorial debut with High School Hero, a comedy for Fox. During Butler's nine-year tenure at Fox, he directed over 30 films, including five Shirley Temple vehicles. Butler's last film for Fox, Kentucky, won Walter Brennan an Academy Award for Best Supporting Actor.

Butler worked with Bing Crosby in Road to Morocco and If I Had My Way. He directed many films starring Doris Day, including It's a Great Feeling, Tea for Two, By the Light of the Silvery Moon, Lullaby of Broadway, April in Paris, and Calamity Jane.

During the late 1950s and 1960s, Butler directed primarily television episodes, mainly for Leave It to Beaver and Wagon Train.

Butler supported Barry Goldwater in the 1964 United States presidential election.

For his contributions to the film industry, Butler was inducted into the Hollywood Walk of Fame in 1960 with a motion pictures star located at 6561 Hollywood Boulevard.

Butler's 1927 Packard Six Series 426 Sedan sold on Bring a Trailer on January 6, 2023.

== Partial filmography ==
- The Birth of a Nation (1915) as Union soldier/Confederate soldier (uncredited)
- The Greatest Thing in Life (1918)
- The Unpainted Woman (1919)
- Better Times (1919)
- Nugget Nell (1919)
- The Petal on the Current (1919)
- The Other Half (1919)
- Bonnie Bonnie Lassie (1919)
- The Pointing Finger (1919)
- The Triflers (1920)
- The Sky Pilot (1921)
- The Wise Kid (1922)
- The Village Blacksmith (1922)
- Conquering the Woman (1922)
- According to Hoyle (1922)
- The Hero (1923)
- A Noise in Newboro (1923)
- Poor Men's Wives (1923)
- Mary of the Movies (1923) (cameo)
- Desire (1923)
- Cause for Divorce (1923)
- The Temple of Venus (1923)
- Hoodman Blind (1923)
- Arizona Express (1924)
- Private Affairs (1925)
- The Phantom Express (1925)
- His Majesty, Bunker Bean (1925)
- The Man on the Box (1925)
- Wages for Wives (1925)
- The People vs. Nancy Preston (1925)
- Havoc (1925)
- The Sap (1926)
- The Blue Eagle (1926)
- Meet the Prince (1926)
- Oh, Baby! (1926)
- The High School Hero (1927)
- News Parade (1928)
- Win That Girl (1928)
- Prep and Pep (1928)
- Sunny Side Up (1929)
- Chasing Through Europe (1929)
- High Society Blues (1930)
- Just Imagine (1930)
- Delicious (1931)
- Business and Pleasure (1932)
- Down to Earth (1932)
- Hold Me Tight (1933)
- My Weakness (1933)
- Bottoms Up (1934)
- Bright Eyes (1934)
- The Little Colonel (1935)
- The Littlest Rebel (1935)
- Captain January (1936)
- Dimples (1936)
- Pigskin Parade (1936)
- Kentucky (1938)
- That's Right – You're Wrong (1939)
- You'll Find Out (1940)
- Caught in the Draft (1941)
- Road to Morocco (1942)
- Thank Your Lucky Stars (1943)
- Shine On, Harvest Moon (1944)
- The Princess and the Pirate (1944)
- San Antonio (1945)
- The Time, the Place and the Girl (1946)
- It's a Great Feeling (1949)
- The Story of Seabiscuit (1949)
- Tea for Two (1950)
- Where's Charley? (1952)
- April in Paris (1952)
- By the Light of the Silvery Moon (1953)
- Calamity Jane (1953)
- King Richard and the Crusaders (1954)
- The Command (1954)
- Jump into Hell (1955)
- The Girl He Left Behind (1956)
- C'mon, Let's Live a Little (1967)
