= High School Hero (1927 film) =

1927 film

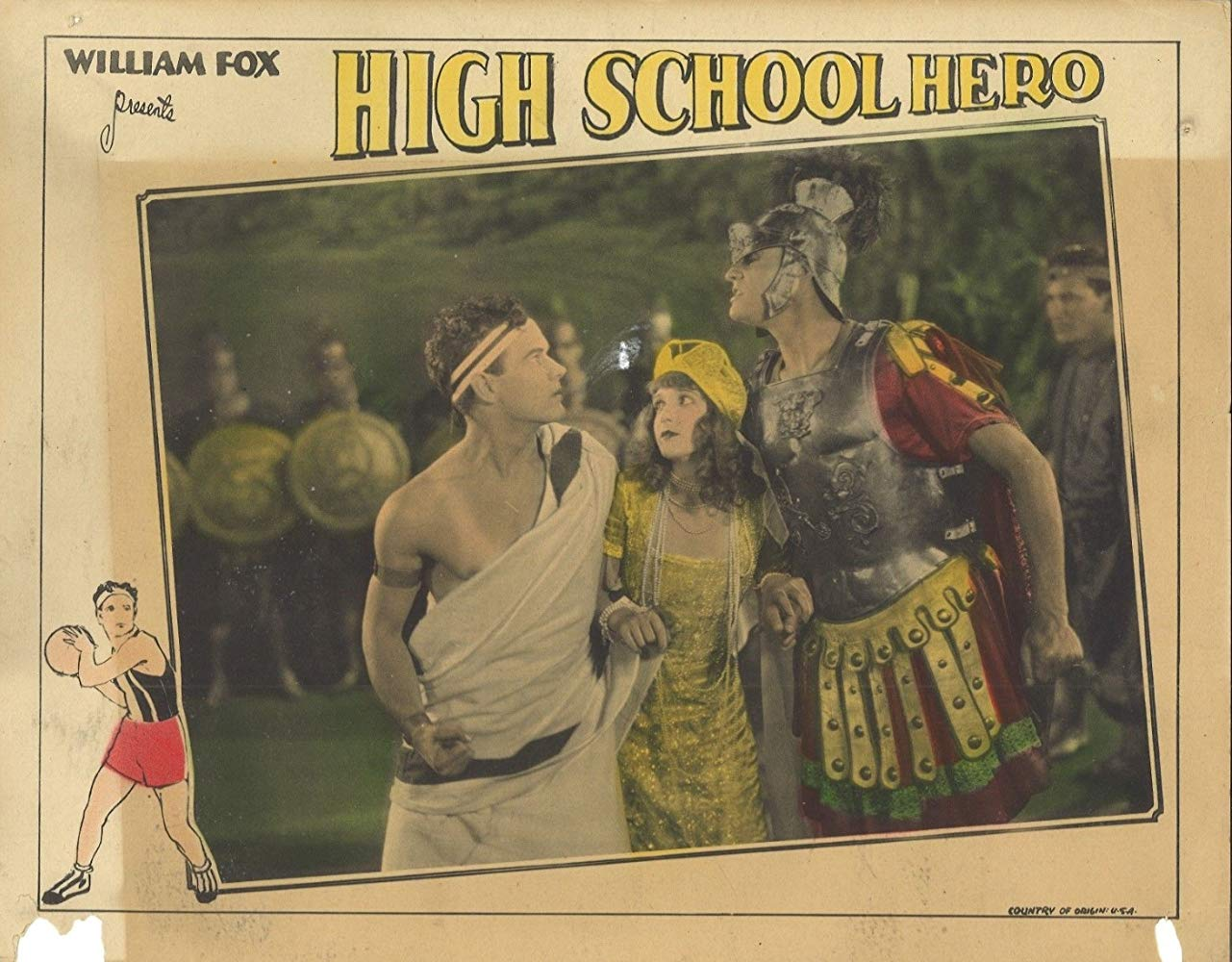
- Lobby card
- Directed by: David Butler; Park Frame (ass't director)
- Written by: Seton I. Miller; Delos Sutherland
- Based on: a story by David Butler and William M. Conselman
- Produced by: William Fox
- Starring: Nick Stuart; John Darrow
- Cinematography: Ernest Palmer
- Distributed by: Fox Film Corporation
- Release date: October 16, 1927
- Running time: 60 minutes
- Country: United States
- Language: Silent (English intertitles)

High School Hero is a 1927 American silent comedy film directed by David Butler and starring Nick Stuart and Sally Phipps. It was produced and distributed by Fox Film Corporation.

== Plot ==
Two pleasant lads, who happen to be enemies, fall in love with the same girl, Eleanor. The first conflict is a struggle to win the leading man role in the school play, a Roman costume drama, against leading lady Eleanor, with many love scenes at stake. The conflict next erupts during a basketball game, causing the coach to bench the pair; they’re put back in late in the game and have to work together to win. In the end, the two lads patch up their differences while Eleanor chooses someone else as her beau.

== Cast ==
- Nick Stuart as Pete Greer
- Sally Phipps as Eleanor Barrett
- William Bailey as Mr. Merrill
- John Darrow as Bill Merrill
- Wade Boteler as Mr. Greer
- Brandon Hurst as Mr. Golden, the Latin professor
- David Rollins as Allen Drew
- Charley Paddock as Coach
- Weegee and Pal, two dogs

== Notes ==
The basketball scenes utilized players from Hollywood High School. Said Paddock: "I am glad that this picture is dealing with the true side of school life. It shows that the younger boys are just as sincere in their frays as regular sportsmen."

== Preservation ==
With no prints of High School Hero located in any film archives, it is a lost film.

== See also ==
- 1937 Fox vault fire
