= The Cuckoos (1930 film) =

1930 film by Paul Sloane

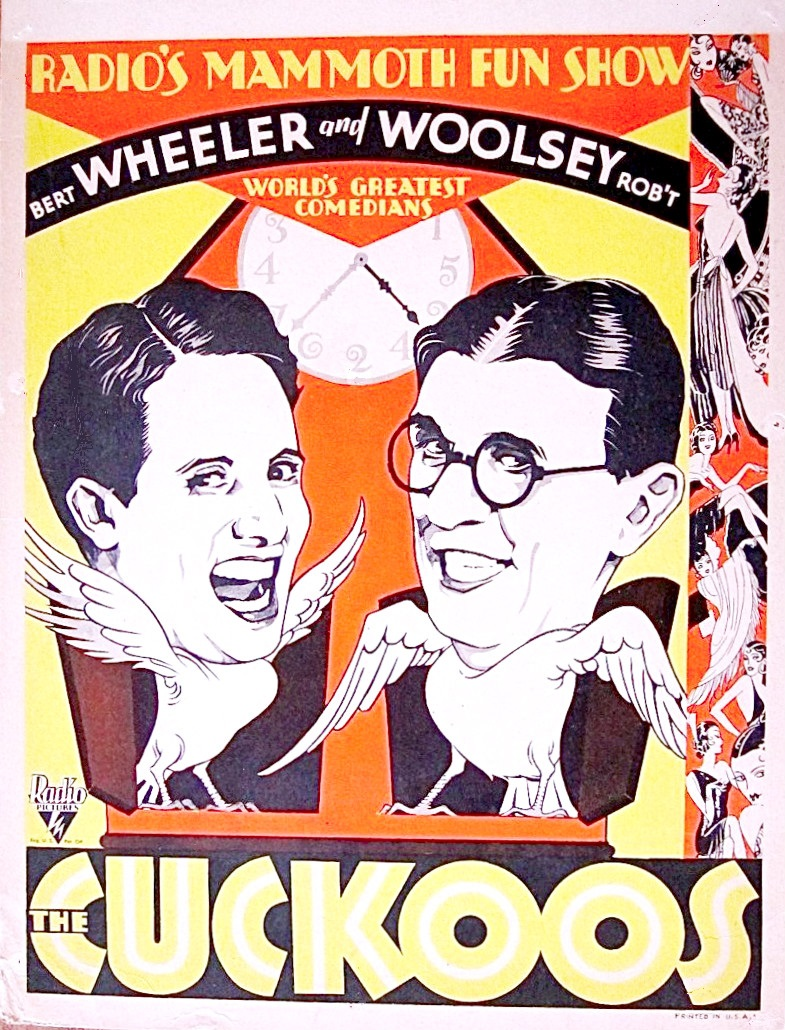
- Theatrical release poster
- Directed by: Paul Sloane
- Written by: Cyrus Wood
- Based on: The Ramblers by Guy Bolton; Bert Kalmar; Harry Ruby
- Produced by: William LeBaron; Louis Sarecky
- Starring: Bert Wheeler; Robert Woolsey
- Cinematography: Nicholas Musuraca
- Edited by: Arthur Roberts
- Music by: Victor Baravalle
- Distributed by: RKO Radio Pictures
- Release date: May 4, 1930
- Running time: 97 minutes
- Country: United States
- Language: English
- Budget: $407,000
- Box office: $863,000

The Cuckoos is a 1930 American pre-Code musical comedy film released by RKO Radio Pictures and partially filmed in two-strip Technicolor. Directed by Paul Sloane, the screenplay was adapted by Cyrus Wood from the 1926 Broadway musical The Ramblers by Guy Bolton, Bert Kalmar, and Harry Ruby. The film stars Bert Wheeler and Robert Woolsey, and while they had appeared on Broadway and in other films together (most notably RKO's Rio Rita the year before), this was their first starring vehicle as a team. The success of this picture, combined with Rio Rita being their most successful film of 1929, convinced the studio to showcase them as Wheeler & Woolsey, the screen's newest comedy team.

== Plot ==
The Cuckoos (1930)

Prof. Cunningham and his partner Sparrow are a pair of charlatan fortune tellers, broke and stranded at a Mexican resort just south of the border. An heiress, Ruth Chester, is running away from her aunt, Mrs. Furst. Ruth is in love with an American pilot, Billy Shannon, but her aunt wishes her to marry the European nobleman, The Baron, whom the aunt believes is the "right" type of person for her niece.

Meanwhile, Sparrow has fallen in love with a young American girl, Anita, who has been living with a band of gypsies. This enrages the leader of the gypsy band, Julius, who has had his eye on Anita for years.

Mrs. Furst tries to persuade Ruth to marry the Baron, but unbeknownst to Mrs. Furst, the Baron is only interested in marrying Ruth for her money. During the course of events, Mrs. Furst falls in love with the Professor, but when the Baron finds out that Ruth is engaged to Billy, he conspires with Julius to kidnap her. During the kidnapping, Anita is also taken, and the girls are taken to a hideout in Mexico. The Professor, Sparrow, and Billy track them down, rout the villains, and recover the girls.

== Cast ==
- Bert Wheeler as Sparrow
- Robert Woolsey as Prof. Cunningham
- Dorothy Lee as Anita
- Jobyna Howland as Mrs. Furst
- Hugh Trevor as Billy Shannon
- June Clyde as Ruth Chester
- Mitchell Lewis as Julius
- Ivan Lebedeff as The Baron
- Marguerita Padula as Gypsy Queen
- Lita Chevret as Senorita at Slot Machine
- Kalla Pasha as Tough Cowboy
- Raymond Maurel as Gypsy Singer

== Song list ==
Music by Bert Kalmar and lyrics by Harry Ruby, unless otherwise noted.

- "All Alone Monday" – Hugh Trevor and June Clyde
- "I Love You So Much (It's a Wonder You Don't Feel It)" – Bert Wheeler and Dorothy Lee
- "(I'll Find You) Wherever You Are" -- June Clyde and Hugh Trevor

(The three songs listed above were composed in counterpoint and may be sung and played simultaneously.)

- "Down in Mexico" – chorus
- "Oh! How We Love Our Alma Mater" – Bert Wheeler and Robert Woolsey
- "I'm a Gypsy" – Robert Woolsey
- "Goodbye" – Bert Wheeler, Robert Woolsey, and Jobyna Howland with chorus
- "Tomorrow Never Comes" – Raymond Maurel with chorus
- "Dancing The Devil Away" – words by Otto Harbach and Bert Kalmar, music by Harry Ruby, sung by Marguerita Padula and danced by Dorothy Lee
- "California Skies" – chorus

== Reception ==
The Cuckoos made a profit of $335,000. The New York Times gave the film a positive review, calling it, "[a] pleasantly irrational screen comedy, with sequences in color and riotous and, at times, ribald buffoonery."

The trade press loved it. Motion Picture News was especially enthusiastic: "Once in every so often there comes in the lives of us showmen a picture so crammed full of exploitation possibilities that we just want to kill ourselves putting it over. Well, boy, here she is. Bert Wheeler & Robert Woolsey are the stars in the show. They are a riot in every foot of the film and you are perfectly safe in shooting for the skies when you tell the customers about them. They will more than fulfill your promises and if any of the patrons squawk, then it's high time to find out what's the matter with them."

== Notes ==
Jobyna Howland's character is never referred to by her full name; it's either "Mrs. Furst" or "Aunt Fanny". The audience is left to deduce that her name is really Fanny Furst (a pun on the phrase "fanny first").

Silent-screen comedy star Roscoe Arbuckle worked behind the scenes, supplying gags for the film.

This film is based on the Broadway musical The Ramblers, starring the comedy team of Bobby Clark and Paul McCullough. The show ran from September 1926 through May 1927 at the Lyric Theater. It had music and lyrics by Bert Kalmar and Harry Ruby, with the book by Guy Bolton, Kalmar, and Ruby.

The film has three musical numbers filmed in Technicolor: "Goodbye", "Dancing the Devil Away", and the finale "I Love You So Much (It's a Wonder You Don't Feel It)".

== See also ==
- List of early color feature films
