= Louis Sarecky =

American film producer

- Born: January 26, 1886; Odessa, Kherson Governorate, Russian Empire
- Died: March 4, 1946 (aged 60); Los Angeles, California, United States
- Occupations: Producer, screenwriter
- Years active: 1928–1941

Louis Sarecky (January 26, 1886 – March 4, 1946) was an American film producer and screenwriter at the very beginning of the sound era of motion pictures. Born in 1886 in Odessa in what was then the Russian Empire (today now part of Ukraine), he began his career in the last year of silent film, 1928, working on five films that year, four as screenwriter and one as producer. While he is only credited with working on 26 films, some of those were among the most popular films at that time: The Vagabond Lover (1929), Rudy Vallée's screen debut; The Cuckoos, starring the comedy team of Wheeler & Woolsey; and Friends and Lovers in 1931, starring Adolphe Menjou and Laurence Olivier. His crowning achievement would be the Academy Award-winning 1931 film Cimarron. Sarecky was the associate producer on the film, as well as helping adapt the screenplay, although he was uncredited for the latter. Since the film won the Oscar for both outstanding production and best adapted screenplay, he would have the dubious distinction of contributing in both those fields, yet not receiving an Academy Award himself (William LeBaron would receive the Outstanding Production Oscar, while Howard Estabrook would get the writing statue).

Sarecky was the brother to the more well-known writer and producer, Barney Sarecky. Louis would die in Los Angeles California in 1946.

== Filmography ==
(as per AFI's database)

| Year | Title | Role | Notes |
|---|---|---|---|
| 1928 | Stocks and Blondes | Producer | |
| 1928 | Blockade | Screenplay | |
| 1928 | Hey Rube! | Screenplay | |
| 1928 | His Last Haul | Original story | |
| 1928 | Legionnaires in Paris | Original story | |
| 1929 | Night Parade | Associate producer | |
| 1929 | Street Girl | Associate producer | |
| 1929 | Tanned Legs | Producer | |
| 1929 | The Vagabond Lover | Associate Producer | |
| 1929 | Love in the Desert | Original story | |
| 1930 | The Cuckoos | Associate Producer | |
| 1930 | Leathernecking | Associate Producer | |
| 1930 | Shooting Straight | Producer | |
| 1931 | Cimarron | Associate Producer, screenplay | |
| 1931 | Are These Our Children? | Associate Producer | |
| 1931 | Friends and Lovers | Producer | |
| 1931 | Everything's Rosie | Associate Producer | |
| 1931 | Kept Husbands | Associate Producer, screenplay | |
| 1931 | The Public Defender | Associate Producer | |
| 1931 | Secret Service | Associate Producer | |
| 1931 | The Runaround | Associate Producer | |
| 1931 | Young Donovan's Kid | Associate Producer | |
| 1932 | The Lost Squadron | Associate Producer | |
| 1932 | Girl of the Rio | Associate Producer | |
| 1934 | Gridiron Flash | Associate Producer | |
| 1941 | Kansas Cyclone | Original story | |
