= Love in the Desert =

1929 film

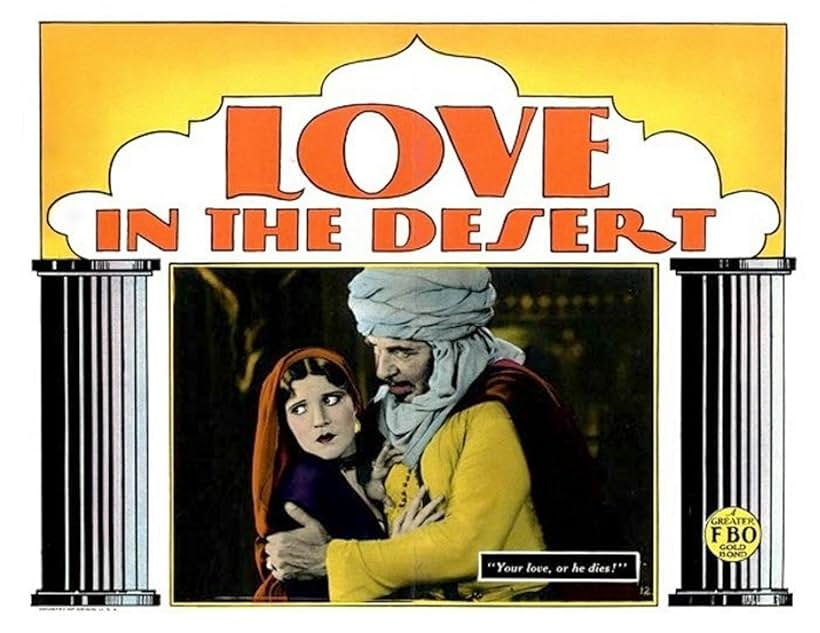
- Lobby card
- Directed by: George Melford
- Written by: Randolph Bartlett; Paul Percy; Louis Sarecky; Harvey F. Thew
- Starring: Olive Borden; Hugh Trevor; Noah Beery
- Cinematography: Paul P. Perry
- Edited by: Mildred Richter
- Production company: Film Booking Offices of America
- Distributed by: Film Booking Offices of America
- Release date: March 17, 1929
- Running time: 7 Reels
- Country: United States
- Languages: Sound (Part-Talkie); English intertitles

Love in the Desert is a 1929 American sound part-talkie drama film directed by George Melford and starring Olive Borden, Hugh Trevor, and Noah Beery. In addition to sequences with audible dialogue or talking sequences, the film features a synchronized musical score and sound effects along with English intertitles. The soundtrack was recorded using the RCA Photophone sound-on-film system.

== Plot ==
In the harsh expanse of North Africa, Abdullah El Krish (Noah Beery), a ruthless desert chieftain, rules a marauding outlaw band. Ambitious and feared, he demands tribute from the tribes and schemes to enrich himself by controlling irrigation rights that promise to make the desert bloom.

Bob Winslow (Hugh Trevor), a young American en route to his father’s great irrigation project near Ourgla, is ambushed by Abdullah’s men and taken prisoner. Dragged to the outlaw’s encampment, Bob finds himself paraded before Abdullah in the tribal tent, where defiance only earns him harsher treatment.

Among the spectators is Zarah (Olive Borden), a strikingly beautiful desert maiden. Bob learns that she is the daughter of Harim (Frank Leigh), a wealthy Arab chief allied with the engineers. Harim has come to Abdullah seeking peace—but the outlaw sheikh demands Zarah’s hand in marriage as the price of conciliation.

Hating Abdullah and dreading a forced union, Zarah quietly befriends Bob. Moved by his courage, she slips into his tent by night and cuts his bonds. With the help of her attendant Fatima (Pearl Varvalle), Zarah leads Bob through the camp’s defenses, providing him with a swift horse. At dawn, she allows him to join her father’s party bound for Ourgla, where Bob is joyously welcomed by the engineers, including his burly friend Briggs (Hilliard Karr).

Enraged at his prisoner’s escape, Abdullah vows vengeance. He rallies his desert riders and sends a grim message to Harim: surrender Zarah to be his bride, or see the town of Ourgla stormed and destroyed.

Zarah, torn between loyalty to her father and her growing love for Bob, makes a fateful decision. Rather than allow her people to suffer, she rides to Abdullah’s camp and gives herself up. Preparations begin at once for the wedding feast.

Disguised in tribal robes, Bob and Briggs infiltrate the outlaw camp. Timing their move as the revelry begins, they overpower the guards and spirit Zarah away into the night. Furious, Abdullah postpones his vengeance no longer. At dawn, his forces thunder toward Ourgla, banners flying and war drums pounding.

The town braces for annihilation. A small detachment of French Legionnaires, hopelessly outnumbered, man the gates and resist the charge. For a time the little garrison holds, but the weight of the tribesmen threatens to overwhelm them.

Abdullah, entrusting the battle to his lieutenants, slips away in pursuit of Zarah, determined to claim her even in the chaos.

He finds her at Harim’s house. Zarah flees to the tower for safety, but Abdullah corners her. At the same moment Bob bursts in, and the two men clash in a ferocious hand-to-hand duel at the tower’s parapet. Blow for blow, they fight with primal fury until Bob seizes the upper hand, hurling Abdullah over the battlements to his death below.

Word spreads quickly through the battlefield that the outlaw chief has fallen. Leaderless, the tribesmen break and scatter, fleeing back into the desert wastes.

Weeks later, word of the desert adventure reaches Mr. Winslow (William H. Tooker) and Mrs. Winslow (Ida Darling) in London. Alarmed, they are horrified to learn that their son is returning with a “native bride.” They steel themselves to disown him.

But when Bob arrives, Zarah is revealed not only as beautiful and refined, but as half-French—educated recently in London itself, and every inch the lady. Relieved and charmed, the Winslows bless the union. The lovers’ happiness is complete, their romance sealed with family approval and the triumph of loyalty and courage over treachery and tyranny.

== Cast ==
- Olive Borden as Zarah
- Hugh Trevor as Bob Winslow
- Noah Beery as Abdullah
- Frank Leigh as Harim
- Pearl Varvalle as Fatima
- William H. Tooker as Mr. Winslow
- Ida Darling as Mrs. Winslow
- Alan Roscoe as Houdish
- Hilliard Karr as Briggs
- Gordon Magee as Sears

== Censorship ==
When Love in the Desert was released, many states and cities in the United States had censor boards that could require cuts or other eliminations before the film could be shown. The Kansas censor board ordered the reduction of the scene with a dancer, eliminating all close-ups where her navel is exhibited.

== Preservation ==
Prints of Love in the Desert survive in Cineteca Del Friuli (Gemona) and Centre national du cinéma et de l'image animée (Fort de Bois-d'Arcy).

== See also ==
- List of early sound feature films (1926–1929)

== Bibliography ==
- Hsu-Ming Teo. Desert Passions: Orientalism and Romance Novels. University of Texas Press, 2012. ISBN 978-0-292-73938-3
