= Max Rée =

Danish art director

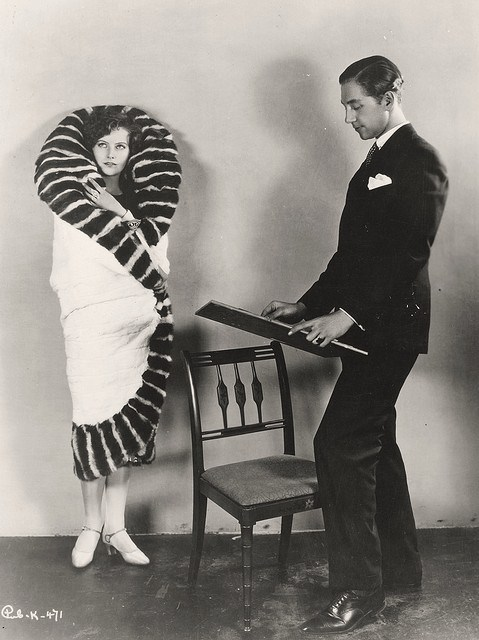
- Greta Garbo & Max Rée on set of Torrent (1926)
- Born: 7 October 1889; Copenhagen, Denmark
- Died: 7 March 1953 (aged 63); Los Angeles, California, U.S.
- Occupation: Art director
- Years active: 1924-1947

Max Rée (7 October 1889 – 7 March 1953) was a Danish architect, costume designer, scene designer, and art director who worked in both theatre and film. He won an Academy Award for Best Art Direction for the film Cimarron. He was born in Copenhagen, Denmark and died in Los Angeles, California.

== Selected filmography ==
- The Private Life of Helen of Troy (1927)
- Love and the Devil (1929)
- The Gay Diplomat (1931)
- The Lady Refuses (1931)
- White Shoulders (1931)
- Cimarron (1931)
- The Lost Squadron (1932)
- A Midsummer Night's Dream (1935)
- Stagecoach (1939)
