= The Pay-Off (1930 film) =

1930 film

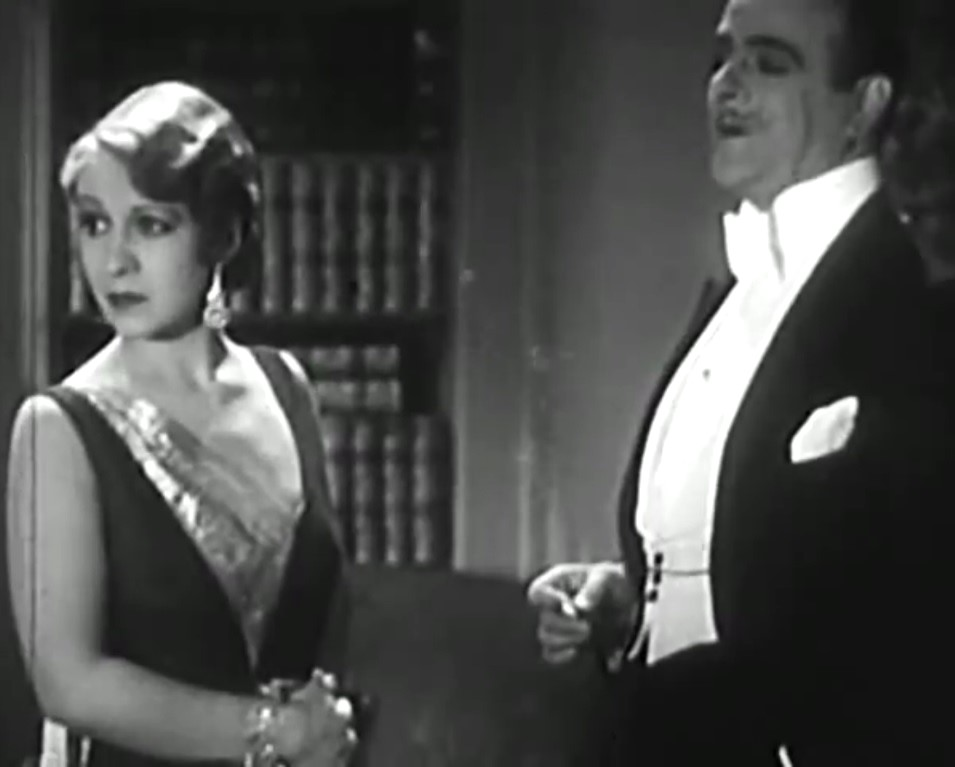
- Millard and Sherman
- Directed by: Lowell Sherman
- Written by: Jane Murfin; John B. Hymer; Samuel Shipman
- Based on: Crime by Samuel Shipman and John B. Hymer
- Produced by: William LeBaron; Henry Hobart
- Starring: Lowell Sherman; Marian Nixon; Hugh Trevor
- Cinematography: J. Roy Hunt
- Edited by: Rose Smith
- Distributed by: RKO Radio Pictures
- Release date: October 15, 1930 (US)
- Running time: 65 minutes
- Country: United States
- Language: English

The Pay Off

The Pay-Off is a 1930 American pre-Code crime drama film directed by Lowell Sherman, who also starred in the film along with Marian Nixon and Hugh Trevor. The screenplay was adapted by Jane Murfin, along with Samuel Shipman and John B. Hymer, based on Shipman and Hymer's 1927 play, Crime.

== Plot ==
Gene Fenmore is a suave gentleman, safely ensconced in the upper crust of society. Unbeknownst to his society acquaintances, he is also the leader of the largest mob in the city. But it is a mob with scruples, thanks to Fenmore, and they only prey on dishonest businessmen, and never shoot or kill anyone. However, there is a power struggle developing between Fenmore and his number two man, Rocky, who disagrees with the moral constraints put on the gang by Fenmore. The tension between the two men is exacerbated by the fact Rocky has taken Fenmore's girlfriend, Dot away from him.

As he starts to exert his influence on the other gang members, Rocky holds up a young engaged couple, Nancy and Tommy, of their last few dollars for the fun of it. When Fenmore hears of the robbery, he gives them back their money and takes them under his wing, offering the both of them jobs on the legitimate side of his business. When Rocky sees that Fenmore has taken a liking to the couple, he develops a plan to use them in order to take over Fenmore's gang. Even though Fenmore has given explicit orders not to involve the couple in the illicit activities of the gang, Rocky takes them along when he goes to hold up a jewelry store. When the robbery goes wrong, Rocky ends up shooting and killing the owner of the store, after which he frames Tommy and Nancy for the crime.

Fenmore finds out about Rocky's plot and confronts him. Rocky admits to the frame as a way to supplant Fenmore as leader of the gang. Fenmore shoots Rocky. The other gang leaders meet to decide whether to punish him. The police arrive and arrest Fenmore.

He meets with the District Attorney and agrees to confess if charges against Tommy and Nancy. As he is led off in handcuffs, Fenmore turns to the police officer and says, "If it wasn't for men like me, they wouldn't need men like you."

== Cast ==
- Lowell Sherman as Gene Fenmore
- Marian Nixon as Nancy
- Hugh Trevor as Rocky
- William Janney as Tommy
- Helene Millard as Dot
- George F. Marion as Mouse
- Walter McGrail as Emory
- Robert McWade as Frank
- Alan Roscoe as District Attorney
- Lita Chevret as Margy
- Bert Moorhouse as Spat

(Cast list as per AFI database)

== Notes ==
The film is based on the play Crime by Shipman and Hymer, which was performed at the Eltinge 42nd Street Theatre (currently the Empire Theatre) in New York City from February to August 1927. In 1938, RKO would remake the film, under the title, Law of the Underworld.

In 1958, the film entered the public domain in the United States because the claimants did not renew its copyright registration in the 28th year after publication.
