= Bert Moorhouse =

American actor (1894–1954)

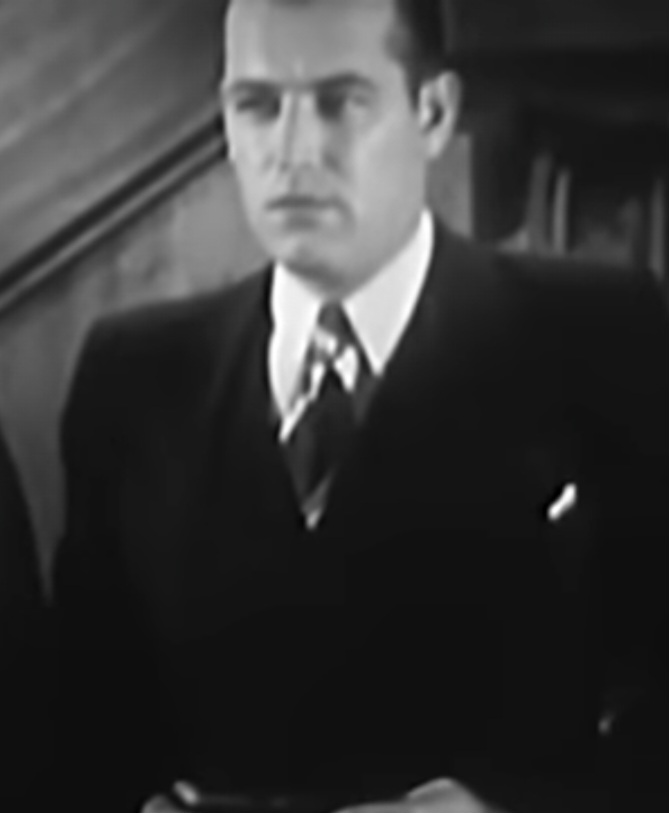
- Moorhouse in The Pay-Off (1930)
- Born: Herbert Green Moorhouse; November 20, 1894; Chicago, Illinois, U.S.
- Died: January 26, 1954 (aged 59); Hollywood, California, U.S.
- Resting place: Forest Lawn Memorial Park, Glendale, California
- Occupation: Actor
- Years active: 1928–1954

Bert Herbert Green Moorhouse (sometimes incorrectly billed as Bert Moorehouse) (November 20, 1894 – January 26, 1954) was an American character actor whose career began at the very tail end of the silent era, and lasted through the mid-1950s.

== Biography ==
Moorhouse was born in Chicago, on November 20, 1894. He entered the film industry in 1928 with featured roles in two FBO productions: Rough Ridin' Red, and the Hugh Trevor vehicle Hey Rube!

He would appear in either featured or small roles in over 130 films during his 26-year career, as well as more than 200 other pictures in which he appeared as an extra. In 1954, he had small roles in three films, the last of which to be premiered was Dangerous Mission, which starred Victor Mature, Piper Laurie, William Bendix, and Vincent Price. All three of these films were released posthumously. Moorhouse was suffering from a severe illness, and on January 26, 1954, aged 59, he committed suicide, via a gunshot wound to the head. He was buried with his mother, Fannie, at Forest Lawn Memorial Park in Glendale, California.

== Filmography ==
(Per AFI database)

- The Cameraman (1928) as Randall (uncredited)
- Hey Rube! (1928) as Moffatt
- Rough Ridin' Red (1928) as Nielson
- The Delightful Rogue (1929) as Nielson
- The Girl from Woolworth's (1929) as Dave
- The Woman I Love (1929)
- Conspiracy (1930) as Victor Holt (uncredited)
- The Pay-Off (1930) as Spat
- You Said a Mouthful (1932) as Office Manager (uncredited)
- Rockabye (1932) as Speakeasy Patron (uncredited)
- Broadway Bill (1934) (uncredited)
- Upperworld (1934) as Court Clerk (uncredited)
- Smarty (1934) as Court Clerk (uncredited)
- Gentlemen Are Born (1934) as Intern (uncredited)
- The Man with Two Faces (1934) as Taxi Driver Bringing Weston (uncredited)
- Return of the Terror (1934) as First Trooper
- The Defense Rests (1934) as Minor Role (uncredited)
- The Captain Hates the Sea (1934) (uncredited)
- Rendezvous (1935) as 2nd Lieutenant (uncredited)
- Broadway Melody of 1936 (1935)
- Goin' to Town (1935) as Conceited Man (uncredited)
- Whipsaw (1935) as Reporter (uncredited)
- Career Woman (1936) as Reporter-Clarkdale (uncredited)
- Cain and Mabel (1936) as First Hotel Desk Clerk (uncredited)
- Love Before Breakfast (1936) as Brokerage Clerk (uncredited)
- Riffraff (1936) as Chet - Fisherman (uncredited)
- Mr. Deeds Goes to Town (1936) as Reporter (uncredited)
- Adventure in Manhattan (1936) as Jim - G-Man (uncredited)
- The Man Who Lived Twice (1936) as Carney (uncredited)
- Rose Bowl (1936) as Reporter (uncredited)
- Wanted! Jane Turner (1936) as Agent with Window Shade (uncredited)
- Pepper (1936) as City Slicker (uncredited)
- Song and Dance Man (1936) as Actor in Beer Parlor (uncredited)
- Wells Fargo (1937) as White House Aide (uncredited)
- Life Begins with Love (1937) as Man (uncredited)
- The Last Gangster (1937) as Hank - a Reporter (uncredited)
- Little Miss Roughneck (1938) as Reporter (uncredited)
- Carefree (1938) as Country Club Member (uncredited)
- When G-Men Step In (1938) as Harry (uncredited)
- In Name Only (1939) as College Man Asking About Game (uncredited)
- Swanee River (1939) as Attendant (uncredited)
- Broadway Serenade (1939) as Reporter (uncredited)
- Dancing Co-Ed (1939) as Workman's Stooge (uncredited)
- North of Shanghai (1939) as Minor Role (uncredited)
- Turnabout (1940) as Photographer's Assistant (uncredited)
- My Favorite Wife (1940) as Postponed Case Lawyer (uncredited)
- Sailor's Lady (1940) as Paymaster (uncredited)
- Two Girls on Broadway (1940) as Reporter (uncredited)
- Charter Pilot (1940) as Thompson (uncredited)
- Dulcy (1940) as Judge's Clerk (uncredited)
- The Man Who Wouldn't Talk (1940) as Officer (uncredited)
- Dressed to Kill (1941) as The Joker (uncredited)
- A Girl, a Guy and a Gob (1941) as Pedestrian (uncredited)
- It Started with Eve (1941) as Mr. Duncan - Middle-Aged Man (uncredited)
- The Monster and the Girl (1941) as Henchman (uncredited)
- Sunny (1941) as Mr. Julian Duprez (uncredited)
- Citizen Kane (1941) as Man at Xanadu Great Hall (uncredited)
- Beyond the Blue Horizon (1942) as Photographer (uncredited)
- Blue, White and Perfect (1942) as First Junior Officer Brooks (uncredited)
- Call Out the Marines (1942)
- Joan of Ozark (1942) as Drunk (uncredited)
- Gangway for Tomorrow (1943) as chairman of the Board (uncredited)
- The Iron Major (1943)
- Mountain Rhythm (1943) as Father (uncredited)
- Whistling in Brooklyn (1943) as Reporter (uncredited)
- Bombardier (1943) as Congressman (uncredited)
- Air Raid Wardens (1943) as Air Raid Warden Recruit (uncredited)
- Government Girl (1943) as Businessman (uncredited)
- Heavenly Days (1944) as Sergeant-at-Arms (uncredited)
- The Falcon in Mexico (1944) as Detective Marks (uncredited)
- The Falcon in Hollywood (1944) as Beautiful Blonde's Husband (uncredited)
- Lake Placid Serenade (1944) as Photographer (uncredited)
- Marine Raiders (1944) as Transport Ship Captain (uncredited)
- The Master Race (1944) as Civilian in Food Line (uncredited)
- Music in Manhattan (1944) as Backstage Photographer (uncredited)
- My Pal Wolf (1944) as Cop (scenes deleted)
- Nevada (1944) as Sandy Bowers (uncredited)
- A Night of Adventure (1944) as Nightclub Patron / Reporter in Courtroom (uncredited)
- Show Business (1944)
- Step Lively (1944) as Second Hotel Clerk (uncredited)
- Along the Navajo Trail (1945) as Secretary (uncredited)
- Behind City Lights (1945) as Desk Clerk (uncredited)
- Her Highness and the Bellboy (1945) as Photographer (uncredited)
- Hitchhike to Happiness (1945) as Publisher (uncredited)
- Lady on a Train (1945) as Reporter (uncredited)
- Shady Lady (1945) as Card Player (uncredited)
- Sunset in Eldorado (1945) as Croupier (uncredited)
- Because of Him (1946) as Reporter (uncredited)
- Faithful in My Fashion (1946) as Clerk (scenes deleted)
- Gay Blades (1946) as Casting Director (uncredited)
- Lady Luck (1946) as Billiard Player (uncredited)
- Night and Day (1946) as Yale Alum of 1916 (uncredited)
- Nocturne (1946) as Movie Director (uncredited)
- One Exciting Week (1946) as Detective (uncredited)
- The Runaround (1946) as Detective Quillan (uncredited)
- The Searching Wind (1946) as Restaurant Diner (uncredited)
- Smooth as Silk (1946) as Detective #1
- That Brennan Girl (1946) as Minor Role (uncredited)
- Undercurrent (1946) as Party Guest (uncredited)
- White Tie and Tails (1946) as Croupier (uncredited)
- Till the Clouds Roll By (1946) as Elite Club Diner (uncredited)
- It's a Wonderful Life (1946) as Man with Sheriff (uncredited)
- Lady in the Lake (1947) as Party Guest (uncredited)
- Angel and the Badman (1947) as Gambler (uncredited)
- Living in a Big Way (1947) as Reporter (uncredited)
- The Perils of Pauline (1947) as Kitchen Set Cameraman (uncredited)
- That's My Man (1947) as Bradford (uncredited)
- Unconquered (1947) as Virginia Militia Officer (uncredited)
- I Walk Alone (1947) as Toll Booth Policeman (uncredited)
- The Big Clock (1948) as Editor at Conference Table (uncredited)
- A Foreign Affair (1948) as Transport Pilot (uncredited)
- Good Sam (1948) as Minor Role (scenes deleted)
- He Walked by Night (1948) as Detective (uncredited)
- Homecoming (1948) as Surgeon (uncredited)
- A Southern Yankee (1948) as Capt. Jeffreys (scenes deleted)
- Up in Central Park (1948) as Democrat (uncredited)
- State of the Union (1948) as Politician (uncredited)
- The Accused (1949) as Prosecutor (uncredited)
- Samson and Delilah (1950)
- The Big Hangover (1950) as Carl O. Oberman, B.P.E.& H. Associate (uncredited)
- Duchess of Idaho (1950) as Fred - the Lodge Desk Clerk (uncredited)
- Key to the City (1950) as Mayor (uncredited)
- Nancy Goes to Rio (1950) as Party Guest (uncredited)
- Right Cross (1950) as Steam Bath Patron (uncredited)
- The Secret Fury (1950) as Tom (uncredited)
- Sunset Boulevard (1950) as Gordon Cole (uncredited)
- Gambling House (1950) as Mr. Douglas' Court Assistant (uncredited)
- Ace in the Hole (1951) as Josh Morgan (uncredited)
- I Was a Communist for the F.B.I. (1951) as Sen. Gray (uncredited)
- Destination Gobi (1953) as Capt. J.E. Mayberry (uncredited)
- Dream Wife (1953) as Attlow (uncredited)
- Crime Wave (1953) as Detective (uncredited)
- The Long, Long Trailer (1954) as Car Salesman (uncredited)
- Dangerous Mission (1954) as Battaglia (uncredited)
