= James Dugan (director) =

American actor and film director

James S. Dugan
- Born: May 19, 1898; Los Angeles, California, United States
- Died: August 5, 1937 (aged 39); Hollywood, California, United States
- Occupation: Director
- Years active: 1921–1937

James Dugan (May 19, 1898 – August 5, 1937), also known as James S. Dugan or Jimmy Dugan was an American film director of the silent and early sound film eras. While mostly used as an assistant or second unit director, he had the opportunity to direct a few silent films. Dugan's career was cut short when he died in 1937 due to heart disease.

== Life and career ==
Born on May 19, 1898, in Los Angeles, California, Dugan would enter the film industry at the age of 23, assisting the prolific director/actor Jerome Storm on the 1921 silent film, Her Social Value. In 1927 he would have his first opportunity to have the top directing slot when he was tagged to direct the western film, The Desert Pirate. Over the next 2 years he would again take the directing reins twice more, but other than that brief foray, the remainder of his career would see him return to either assistant or unit direction roles. In 1935, although he had worked with her on several films, Dugan would remove himself as assistant director on Mae West's film, Klondike Annie, citing differences with the actress.

In the midst of a career in which he was continuously working, Dugan would die on August 5, 1937, from heart disease, mere months after the release of the final film he worked on, A Family Affair. He was survived by a wife and two children.

=== Filmography ===
(as per AFI's database)

Year	Title	Role	Silent (S)/Talkie (T)	Notes
1921	Her Social Value	Assistant director	S	
1921	Trust Your Wife	Assistant director	S	
1926	Rose of the Tenements	Assistant director	S	
1926	The Adorable Deceiver	Assistant director	S	
1926	Going the Limit	Assistant director	S	
1927	Aflame in the Sky	Assistant director	S	
1927	The Desert Pirate	Director	S	
1927	The Lure of the Night Club	Assistant director	S	
1927	Moulders of Men	Assistant director	S	
1928	Dead Man's Curve	Assistant director	S	
1928	Dog Justice	Assistant director	S	
1928	Her Summer Hero	Director	S	
1928	King Cowboy	Assistant director	S	
1928	Phantom of the Range	Director	S	
1928	Sinners in Love	Assistant director	S	
1928	Night Parade	Actor - "Artie"	S	
1929	The Drifter	Assistant director	S	
1929	Outlawed	Assistant director	S	
1929	Warming Up	Cast - "Brill"	T	
1931	Everything's Rosie	Assistant director	T	
1933	She Done Him Wrong	Assistant director	T	
1934	Belle of the Nineties	Assistant director	T	
1934	Four Frightened People	Assistant director	T	
1934	The Lemon Drop Kid	Assistant director	T	
1935	Accent on Youth	Assistant director	T	
1935	Goin' to Town	Assistant director	T	
1936	Wives Never Know	Second unit director	T	
1936	Yours for the Asking	Assistant director	T	
1937	A Family Affair	Assistant director	T	
