= Lita Chevret =

American actress

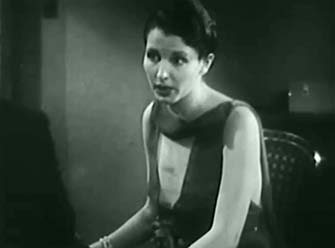
- Chevret in the 1930 film The Pay-Off
- Born: May 27, 1908; Oakland, California, U.S.
- Died: May 23, 2001 (aged 92); Palm Springs, California, U.S.
- Occupation: Actress
- Years active: 1929–1940
- Spouses: Alfred Hickman; Carlton Williams

Lita Chevret (May 27, 1908 – May 23, 2001) was an American actress who began her career at the genesis of sound films. She appeared in over 60 films between 1929 and 1940, although in most of those she had small or non-billed parts.

== Life ==
Chevret was born on May 27, 1908, in Oakland, California, to show-business parents, who ensured that she received training in both singing and dance.

== Career ==
Chevret began acting with a stock theatre company when she was 16 years old. She also appeared in Berkeley productions of Irving Pichel and in Fanchon and Marco revues.

Based on her dancing ability, Chevret broke into the film business in 1929's Fox Movietone Follies of 1929, with an uncredited role. The following year she appeared in Words and Music in a small unbilled role, in John Wayne's first film where he had a significant role (billed as Duke Morrison). That same year, she appeared in RKO Radio Pictures' Rio Rita, their most successful picture of the year.

In 1930, RKO would offer Chevret a 3-year contract, which would be renewed for an additional 3 years. However, she was relegated to mostly small and bit roles while under contract with RKO. When her contract expired in 1936, she made the decision not to renew, and to attempt to become a freelance actress.

She continued acting for another five years, still in small and often unbilled roles, until her retirement in 1941. Her final role was a small part in The Philadelphia Story.

== Personal life ==
Chevret was married to Alfred Hickman and Carlton Williams.

== Filmography ==
(Filmography based on the AFI database, with supplemental information from Media Bang)

Year	Title	Role	Notes
1929	Fox Movietone Follies of 1929	Chorine	
1929	The Locked Door	Girl on rumboat	
1929	Words and Music	Showgirl	
1929	Tanned Legs	Beach Girl	
1929	Rio Rita	Showgirl	
1930	The Pay-Off	Margy	
1930	The Cuckoos	Slot Machine Señorita	
1931	The Royal Bed	Lady-in-waiting	
1931	Laugh and Get Rich	Party Guest	
1931	Everything's Rosie	Madeline Van Dorn	
1931	Kept Husbands	Gwen	
1931	Three Who Loved	Party Girl	
1932	Symphony of Six Million	Birdie Klauber	
1932	Ladies of the Jury	Cynthia Tate	
1932	What Price Hollywood?	Actress	
1932	Girl Crazy	Mary	
1932	One Hour With You	Party Guest	
1932	Call Her Savage	Party Guest	
1932	Rockabye	Party Guest	
1932	After Tomorrow	Office Worker	
1932	Westward Passage	Woman at Party	
1932	Merry-Go-Round	Mary	
1932	The Big Flash	Nadine	
1933	The Man Who Dared: An Imaginative Biography	Miss Rainey	
1933	Daring Daughters	Gwen Moore	
1933	Goldie Gets Along	Marie Gardner	
1933	Only Yesterday	Uncredited	
1934	Charlie Chan's Courage	Chorus Girl	
1934	Glamour	Grassie	
1934	Romance in the Rain	Jennie	
1934	Transatlantic Merry-Go-Round	Countess de Marino	
1934	The Girl from Missouri	Miss Ulricks	
1935	Dante's Inferno	Mrs. Martin	
1935	Ship Cafe	Dancing teacher	
1935	Go into Your Dance	Angry Showgirl #1	
1935	Escapade	Guest	
1935	Under the Pampas Moon	Beautiful Girl	
1935	The Murder Man	Clara	
1936	Champagne Charlie	Roulette player	
1936	Follow the Fleet	Woman in casino	
1937	Criminal Lawyer	Nora James	
1937	Sandflow	Rose Porter	Starring role
1937	Espionage	French secretary	
1937	Camille	Woman in theater box	
1938	Rebellious Daughters	Rita	
1938	The Road to Reno	Gladys	
1939	The Women	Woman under sunlamp	
1940	The Fatal Hour	Tanya Sarova	
1940	Midnight Limited	Mae Krantz	
1940	The Philadelphia Story	Manicurist	
