= Easy Pickings =

1927 film

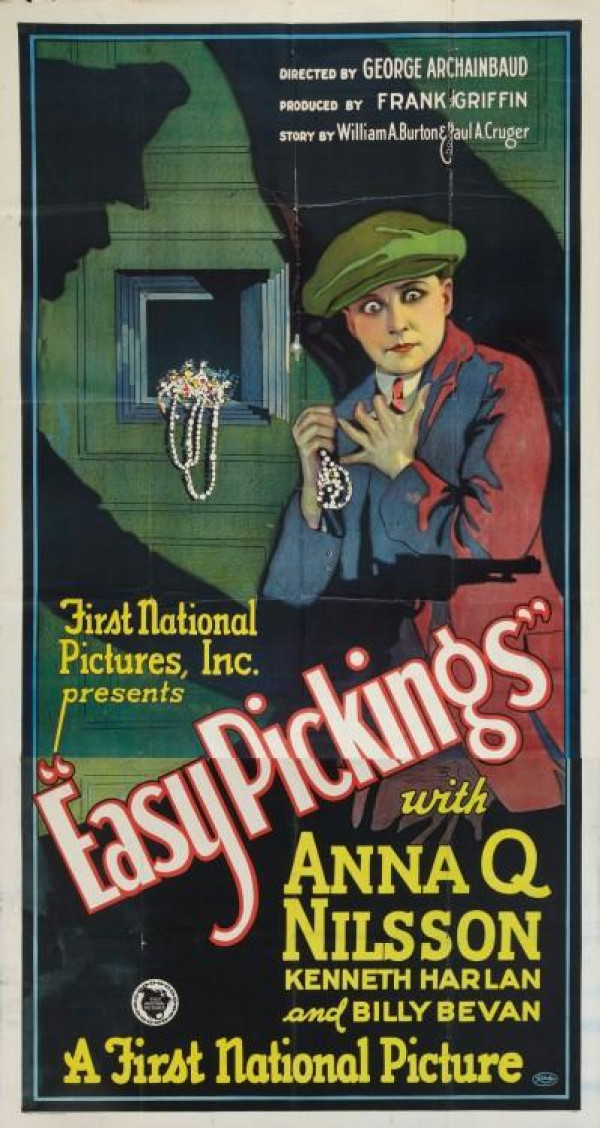
- Directed by: George Archainbaud
- Written by: Louis Stevens
- Based on: play by Paul A. Cruger and William A. Burton
- Produced by: First National Pictures; Frank Griffin
- Starring: Anna Q. Nilsson; Kenneth Harlan
- Cinematography: Charles Van Enger
- Distributed by: First National Pictures
- Release date: February 20, 1927
- Running time: 6 reels

Easy Pickings is a 1927 silent film mystery or 'old dark house' story directed by George Archainbaud and starring Anna Q. Nilsson and Kenneth Harlan. It is based on a play written by Paul A. Cruger and William A. Burton. Zack Williams plays the stereotypical Negro servant who mugs his way through the film in an exaggeratedly nervous manner. Comedic actor Billy Bevan plays the detective in the film in a more-serious-than-usual manner, and later went on to appear in Dracula's Daughter (1936) and The Invisible Man Returns (1940).

Lead actress Nilsson emigrated from Sweden to Hollywood to appear in a number of silent films, but her career could not survive the coming of sound films. Cameraman Van Enger had photographed the 1925 Lon Chaney classic The Phantom of the Opera, and years later would handle the camerawork on Abbott and Costello Meet Frankenstein (1948). Director Archainbaud wound up directing TV shows in the 1950s such as The Gene Autry Show and Lassie.

== Plot ==
Mary Ryan and Peter Van Horne get stranded in a haunted house inhabited by some very odd characters. The house is supposed to be haunted by ghosts. A detective shows up to investigate the strange goings-on.

== Cast ==
- Anna Q. Nilsson - Mary Ryan
- Kenneth Harlan - Peter Van Horne
- Philo McCullough - Stewart
- Billy Bevan - The Detective
- Jerry Miley - Tony
- Charles Sellon - Dr. Naylor
- Zack Williams - Remus, the black servant
- Gertrude Howard - Mandy

== Preservation ==
- A copy resides in Italy at Cineteca Nazionale, Rome.

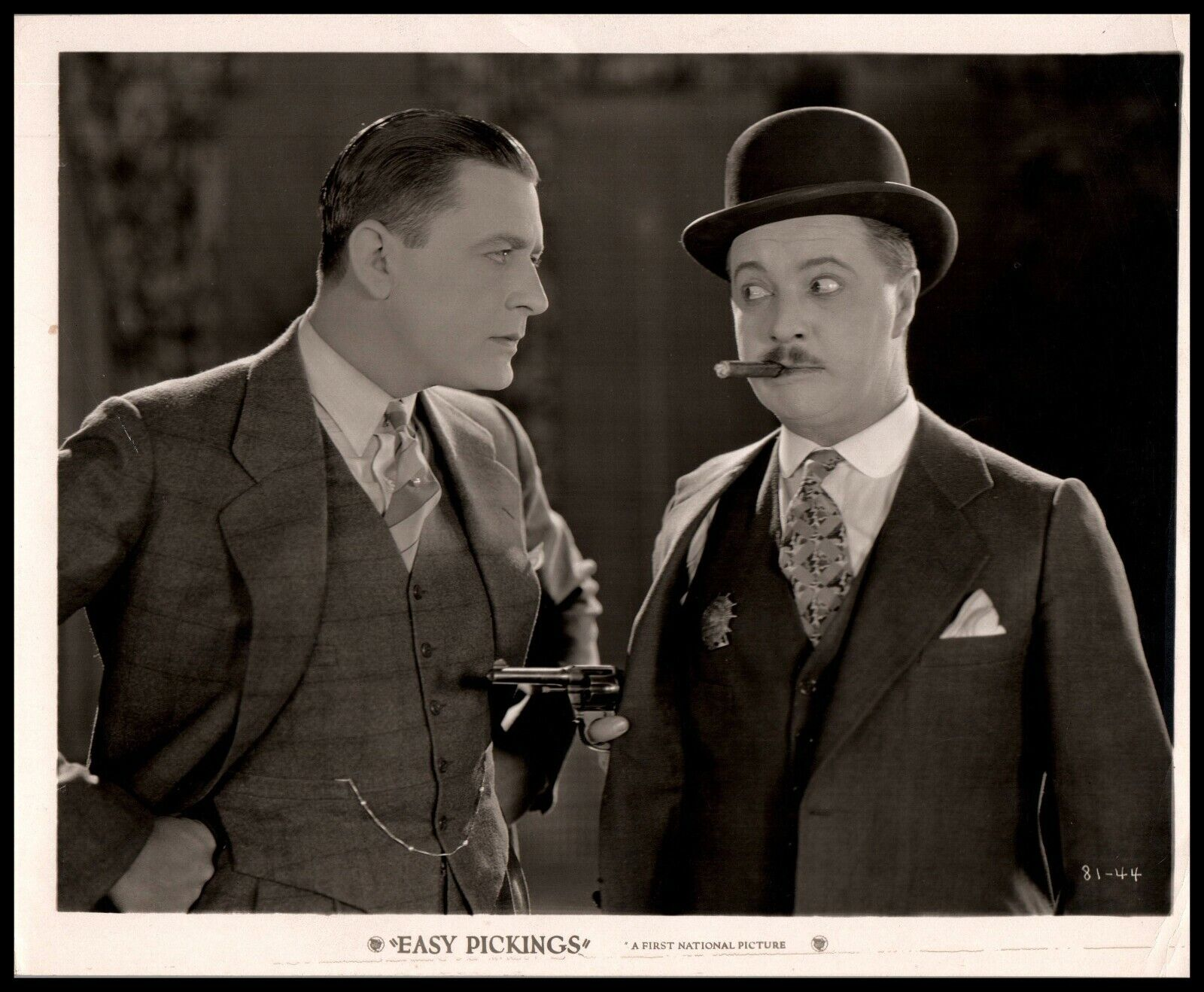
Harlan and Bevan in a still from the film.

At one time the film was considered lost.
