= Warming Up (1928 film) =

1928 film

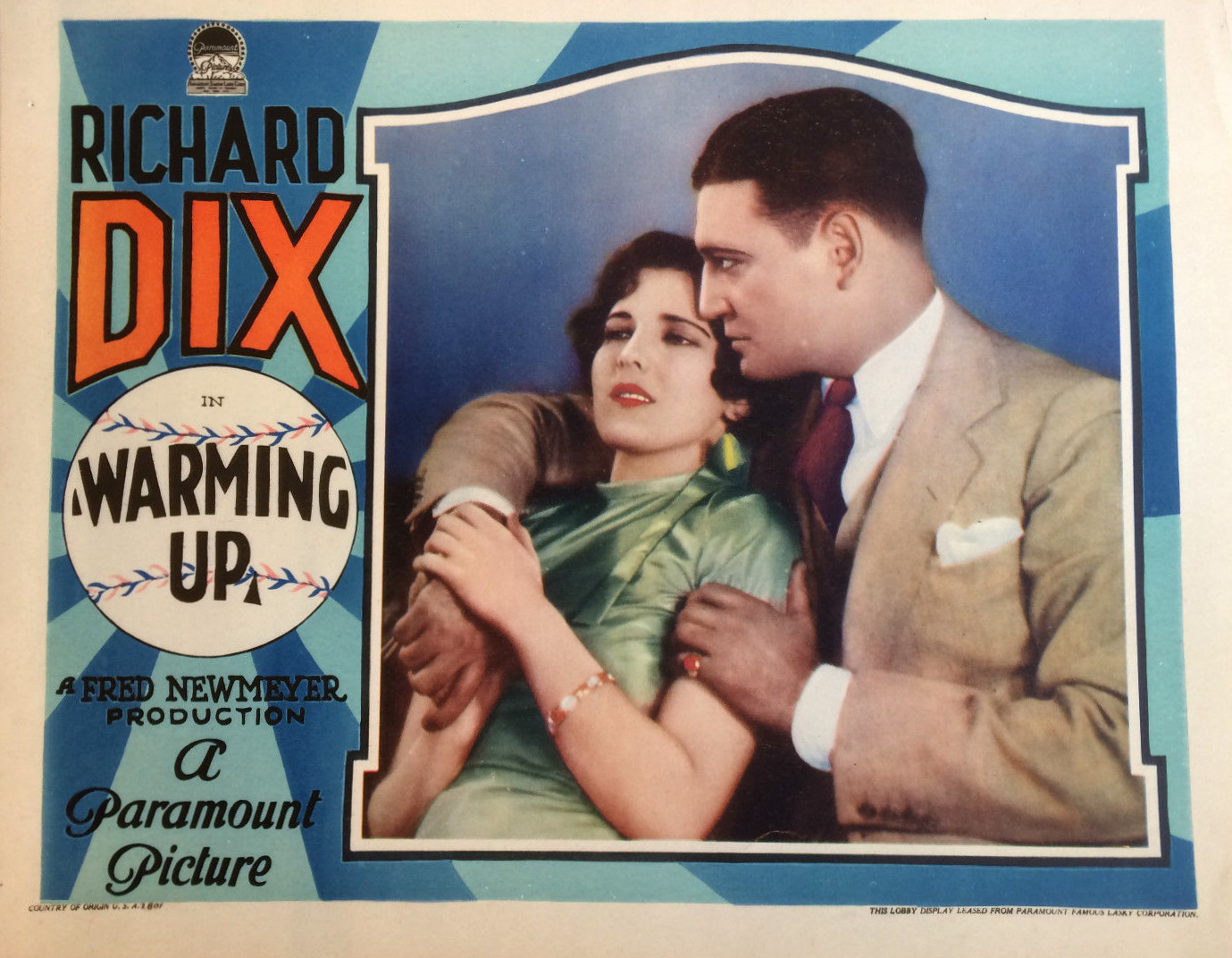
- Lobby card
- Directed by: Fred C. Newmeyer
- Written by: Ray Harris (screenplay); Sam Mintz (story); George Marion, Jr. (intertitles)
- Produced by: Adolph Zukor; Jesse L. Lasky
- Starring: Richard Dix; Jean Arthur
- Cinematography: Edward Cronjager
- Music by: Gerard Carbonara
- Distributed by: Paramount Pictures
- Release date: July 15, 1928
- Running time: 80 minutes (8 reels)
- Country: United States
- Languages: Sound (Synchronized); English Intertitles)

Warming Up is a 1928 synchronized sound American baseball film starring Richard Dix and Jean Arthur, directed by Fred C. Newmeyer, and released by Paramount Pictures. The film is significant historically as Paramount's first sound film. Whilst the film has no audible dialog, it was released with a synchronized musical score with sound effects using the Western Electric Sound System sound-on-film process. The film's soundtrack was dubbed onto the sound-on-disc format for those theatres that lacked equipment needed to be the sound-on-film process. No prints of Warming Up are known to currently exist, and the film is considered lost.

The film featured several major league baseball players as themselves.

== Plot ==
Bert Tulliver (Richard Dix), star pitcher of the small-town Eureka Bearcats, crashes into the spring training camp of the major-league Green Sox and immediately earns the enmity of McRae (Philo McCullough), the team's arrogant "home-run king," recently acquired through a shady deal from the rival Pawnees. Thrown out of the park, Bert wanders the boardwalk and meets Mary Post (Jean Arthur), whom he believes to be a governess named "Miss Zilch." In truth, she is the daughter of Mr. Post (Claude King), the owner of the Green Sox. Their meeting is sparked by the antics of her mischievous nephew Edsel (Billy Kent Schaefer).

Bert lands a job as a demonstrator at a boardwalk concession, impressing Mr. Post enough to be invited to report to Green Sox practice. As he continues to court “Miss Zilch,” Bert agrees to visit her in the Post kitchen, unaware of her true identity or that McRae is also interested in her.

At training, McRae sabotages Bert at every turn, ultimately convincing him that he's a jinx. When McRae's contract is ruled invalid, he is returned to the Pawnees—just in time to face the Green Sox in the World Series. Bert is brought in to pitch but, rattled by McRae, walks him and is benched in disgrace.

Later, Bert visits Mary in the Post kitchen, still unaware she is the team owner's daughter. After the game, he sees McRae calling on Mary and assumes she loves the rival slugger. Hurt, Bert ignores her attempts to reach him.

With the World Series tied and the Green Sox pitcher exhausted, Bert is sent into the final game as a last resort. Nervous and unraveling, he steadies only when Mary signals her love from the grandstand. Renewed by her support, Bert strikes out two batters—and then, facing McRae once more, strikes out the slugger to win the championship.

At the celebration that follows at the Post home, Bert finally learns Mary's true identity and the misunderstanding is cleared. Victory on the field is matched by personal triumph.

== Cast ==
- Richard Dix as Bert Tulliver
- Jean Arthur as Mary Post
- Claude King as Mr. Post
- Philo McCullough as McRae
- Billy Kent Schaefer as Edsel
- Roscoe Karns as Hippo
- James Dugan as Brill
- Mike Donlin as Veteran Baseball Player / Himself
- Mike Ready as Himself
- Chet Thomas as himself
- Joe Pirrone as himself
- Wally Hood as himself
- Bob Murray as himself
- Truck Hannah as himself
- Wade Boteler in a bit part (uncredited)

== Music ==
The film featured a theme song entitled "Out Of The Dawn" which was composed by Walter Donaldson. Also featured on the soundtrack was the song "I’m Just Wild About A Baseball Game" which was also composed by Walter Donaldson.

== Preservation status ==
This film is now considered a lost film, with no prints known to survive. The soundtrack for this film is lost apart from the discs for the overture and theme song.

== See also ==
- List of baseball films
- List of lost films
- List of early sound feature films (1926–1929)
- Movietone sound system
