= Conspiracy (1930 film) =

1930 film by Christy Cabanne

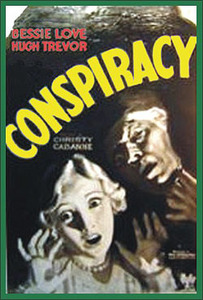
- Film poster
- Directed by: Christy Cabanne
- Written by: Beulah Marie Dix
- Based on: The Conspiracy; 1912 play by: Robert B. Baker; John Emerson
- Produced by: William LeBaron
- Starring: Bessie Love; Ned Sparks
- Cinematography: Nicholas Musuraca
- Edited by: Arthur Roberts
- Music by: Roy Webb
- Distributed by: RKO Pictures
- Release date: August 10, 1930 (U.S.)
- Running time: 69 minutes
- Country: United States
- Language: English
- Budget: $118,000
- Box office: $138,000

Conspiracy (1930) by Christy Cabanne

Conspiracy is a 1930 American pre-Code mystery melodrama film produced and distributed by RKO Pictures and directed by Christy Cabanne. It is the second adaptation of the play The Conspiracy by Robert B. Baker and John Emerson and stars Bessie Love and Ned Sparks.

== Plot ==
After their father is killed, brother and sister Margaret and Victor Holt devote themselves to bringing down the drug gang responsible for his death. Victor rises to become an attorney in the district attorney's office, and eventually Margaret wangles her way into becoming the secretary for James (Marco) Morton, the head of the drug ring. When Morton discovers Margaret's true identity, he contrives a plot to lure her brother into a trap and kill him.

Margaret learns of the plot and rushes to save her brother. In the ensuing melee, she kills Morton in her attempt to save Victor, who is also seemingly killed. Afraid of being convicted of murder, she flees the scene. In hiding, she becomes friends with a mystery author, Winthrop Clavering, and a reporter, John Howell, the truth about the murder is revealed, and it is discovered that Victor was not killed, but is being held prisoner by the drug ring. Victor is rescued, and Margaret and John develop a romantic relationship.

== Cast ==
- Bessie Love as Margaret Holt
- Ned Sparks as Winthrop Clavering
- Hugh Trevor as John Howell
- Rita La Roy as Nita Strong
- Ivan Lebedeff as Butch Miller
- Gertrude Howard as Martha
- Otto Matieson as James Morton/Marko
- Jane Keckley as Rose Towne
- Donald MacKenzie as Captain McLeod
- George Irving as Mark Holt
- Bert Moorehouse as Victor Holt
- Walter Long as Weinberg

== Production ==
This film is the second adaptation of the Baker/Emerson play, the earlier version being the silent film, The Conspiracy, filmed in 1914 by the Famous Players Film Company, produced by Charles Frohman, and starring Emerson himself in the role of Clavering, reprised from his stint in the Broadway play. It ran from December 1912 through May 1914 at Garrick Theatre in New York City.

This film is not connected to another RKO film made in 1939 also called Conspiracy.

== Reception ==
The film recorded a loss of $50,000.

== Preservation ==
This film is preserved at the Library of Congress.

In 1958, the film entered the public domain in the U.S. because the copyright claimants did not renew the copyright registration in the 28th year after publication.
