= Lure of the Islands =

1942 film directed by Jean Yarbrough

- Theatrical release poster
- Directed by: Jean Yarbrough
- Screenplay by: Edmond Kelso; George Bricker; Scott Littleton
- Produced by: Lindsley Parsons
- Starring: Margie Hart; Robert Lowery; Guinn "Big Boy" Williams; Gale Storm; Ivan Lebedeff; Warren Hymer
- Cinematography: Mack Stengler
- Edited by: Jack Ogilvie
- Production company: Monogram Pictures
- Distributed by: Monogram Pictures
- Release date: July 3, 1942
- Running time: 61 minutes
- Country: United States
- Language: English

Lure of the Islands is a 1942 American adventure film directed by Jean Yarbrough and written by Edmond Kelso, George Bricker and Scott Littleton. The film stars Margie Hart, Robert Lowery, Guinn "Big Boy" Williams, Gale Storm, Ivan Lebedeff and Warren Hymer. The film was released on July 3, 1942, by Monogram Pictures.

== Plot ==
In the South Pacific, undercover agents Wally and Jinx look for their local contact who was shot by the commandant, a Nazi, before he could pass details of a secret German/Japanese radio.

Island girls under taboo, Tana and Maui, agree to help, but for a price – they want to get married!

The Nazis kidnap the chief to force the natives to cut down trees to build an air field, but cutting the trees is forbidden. Wally and Jinx rescue the chief and a Japanese plane crashes in the trees that were never cut.

The islanders are free from occupation, and the two couples leave with the help of a destroyer.

== Cast ==
- Margie Hart as Tana O'Shaughnessy
- Robert Lowery as Wally
- Guinn "Big Boy" Williams as Jinx
- Gale Storm as Maui
- Ivan Lebedeff as Commandant
- Warren Hymer as Albert
- Tris Coffin as Skipper
- John Bleifer as Lt. Lavar
- Satini Pualoa as Matu
- Namure Nordman as Native Girl
- Kam Tong as Lt. Kono
- Angelo Cruz as Japanese Pilot
- Kahala Bray as Dancer
- Odetta Bray as Dancer
