= Cimarron (1931 film) =

1931 film by Wesley Ruggles

- theatrical release poster
- Directed by: Wesley Ruggles
- Screenplay by: Howard Estabrook; Louis Sarecky
- Based on: Cimarron; 1930 novel by Edna Ferber
- Produced by: William LeBaron; Louis Sarecky (assoc.)
- Starring: Richard Dix; Irene Dunne
- Cinematography: Edward Cronjager
- Edited by: William Hamilton
- Music by: Max Steiner
- Production company: RKO Radio Pictures
- Distributed by: RKO Radio Pictures
- Release dates: January 26, 1931 (New York City); February 9, 1931 (US)
- Running time: 124 minutes
- Country: United States
- Language: English
- Budget: $1,433,000
- Box office: $1,383,000

Cimarron is a 1931 American pre-Code epic Western film starring Richard Dix and Irene Dunne, and directed by Wesley Ruggles. Released by RKO Radio Pictures, it won Academy Awards for Best Picture, Best Adapted Screenplay (written by Howard Estabrook and based on Edna Ferber's 1930 novel Cimarron), and Best Production Design (by Max Rée). It is the first of four Westerns to ever win the top honor at the Academy Awards, being followed almost 60 years later by Dances With Wolves in 1990, Unforgiven in 1992, and No Country for Old Men in 2007.

Both Dix and Dunne were nominated for their leading roles, and Edward Cronjager for Best Cinematography, but did not win. Estelle Taylor, Edna May Oliver, and Roscoe Ates appeared in supporting roles. Epic in scope, spanning forty years from 1889 to 1929, Cimarron was RKO's most expensive production up to that date, as well as its first production to win the Best Picture Oscar. It was a critical success, although it did not recoup its production costs during its initial run in 1931. As the film was registered for copyright late in 1930, it and the original book entered the public domain together on January 1, 2026.

== Plot ==
Cimarron (1931)

The Oklahoma Land Rush of 1889 prompts thousands to travel to the Oklahoma Territory to grab free government land; Yancey Cravat and his young bride, Sabra, cross the border from Kansas to join the throngs. In the ensuing race, Yancey is outwitted by a young prostitute, Dixie Lee, who takes the prime piece of real estate, the Bear Creek claim, that Yancey had targeted for himself.

His plans for establishing a ranch thwarted, Yancey moves into the town of Osage, a boomtown, where he confronts and kills Lon Yountis, an outlaw who had killed the prior publisher of the local newspaper. Having a background in publishing, Yancey establishes the Oklahoma Wigwam, a weekly newspaper, to help turn the frontier camp into a respectable town. After the birth of the Cravats' daughter, Donna, a gang of outlaws threatens Osage, led by "The Kid", who happens to be Yancey's old acquaintance. To save the town, Yancey faces and kills The Kid.

Beset by guilt over his killing of The Kid, Yancey leaves Sabra and his children to chase another land rush settling the Cherokee Strip. After his departure, Sabra takes over the publication of the Wigwam, and raises her children until Yancey returns five years later, after serving in the Spanish–American War. Not to her, but just in time to represent Dixie Lee, who had been charged with being a public nuisance, and win her acquittal.

Osage continues to grow, as does the Territory of Oklahoma, which gains statehood in 1907 and benefits from the early oil boom of the 1900s. Also prospering alongside the settlers are the Native American tribes, which Yancey supports through editorials in his newspaper. Once more he disappears from Osage, for several years. At the time, Sabra is vehemently anti–Native American, despite her son's involvement with an Indian woman.

Years later Sabra becomes the first female member of Congress from the state of Oklahoma, taken to lauding the virtues of her by-then Indian daughter-in-law.

Sabra and Yancey are reunited one final time when she rushes to his side after he has rescued numerous oil drillers from a devastating explosion. He dies in her arms.

== Cast ==
The principal cast, according to the AFI database, and The RKO Story include:

- Richard Dix as Yancey Cravat
- Irene Dunne as Sabra Cravat
- Estelle Taylor as Dixie Lee
- Nance O'Neil as Felice Venable
- William Collier Jr. as The Kid
- Roscoe Ates as Jesse Rickey
- George E. Stone as Sol Levy
- Stanley Fields as Lon Yountis
- Robert McWade as Louis Hefner
- Edna May Oliver as Tracy Wyatt
- Judith Barrett as Donna Cravat
- Eugene Jackson as Isaiah
- Dennis O'Keefe (uncredited)

== Production ==
Despite being in the depths of the Great Depression, RKO Radio Pictures invested more than $1.5 million (equivalent to approximately $31.8 million in 2025) into production of Ferber's novel.

Filming began in the summer of 1930 at the Quinn Ranch outside of Los Angeles, California, where the land rush scenes were shot. More than twenty-eight cameramen, and numerous camera assistants and photographers, were used to capture scenes of more than 5,000 costumed extras, covered wagons, buckboards, surreys, and bicyclists as they raced across grassy hills and prairie to stake their claim.

Cinematographer Edward Cronjager planned out every take (that recalled the scenes of Intolerance some fifteen years earlier) in accordance with Ferber's descriptions. In order to film key scenes for this production, RKO purchased 89 acres (36 hectares) in Encino where construction of art director Max Rée's Oscar-winning design of a complete western town and a three-block modern main street were built to represent the fictional Oklahoma boomtown of Osage. These award-winning sets eventually formed the nucleus of RKO's expansive movie ranch, in Encino, where other RKO (and non-RKO) films were later shot.

== Release ==
RKO Radio Pictures premiered Cimarron at the Globe Theatre, 46th Street & Broadway, in New York City on January 26, 1931, to much praise, and then on February 6 a Los Angeles Orpheum Theatre premiere followed, that also included personal appearances of Richard Dix and Irene Dunne, a stage show and an augmented orchestra. Three days later, the movie was released to theaters throughout the nation. Despite being a critical success, the extremely high budget and ongoing Depression combined against the film. While it was a commercial success in line with other films of the day, RKO Pictures could not at first recoup their heavy investment in the film, that ended up losing $565,000. However, it recouped some more money on a 1935 re-release that enjoyed another premiere in Oklahoma City at the (John Eberson-designed) Midwest Theatre. The movie remained RKO's most expensive film until 1939's Gunga Din, which had exteriors filmed in the Alabama Hills at the foot of the Sierra Nevada range, but had one scene shot on RKO's movie ranch in Encino).

== Reception ==
=== Contemporary reviews ===
Reviews by film critics were overwhelmingly positive at the time. Variety led off its review with: "An elegant example of super film making and a big money picture. This is a spectacular western away from all others. It holds action, sentiment, sympathy, thrills and comedy – and 100% clean. Radio Pictures has a corker in 'Cimarron'." The review went on to praise the actors, particularly Dix and Oliver, as well as the direction, stating, "Wesley Ruggles apparently gets the full credit for this splendid and heavy production. His direction misses nothing in the elaborate scenes, as well as in the usual film making procedure." The magazine specifically pointed out the quality of the make-up in the aging of the principal players, who have to go through forty years on-screen.

Mordaunt Hall of The New York Times also gave the film a stellar review, calling it: "A graphic and engrossing screen conception of Edna Ferber's widely read novel ...", and also praised the handling of the passage of time in this epic. Hall also singled out the performance of Dunne. Motion Picture Magazine raved: "A great and worthy effort, this transcription of early Oklahoma life will be hailed as one of the high-spots of the year. It has everything. RKO seems to have placed no restrictions upon making it a lavish, bona-fide epic."

John Mosher of The New Yorker praised the "great care" that had been taken with the historical accuracy of the film's visual details, that he thought "as good as anything that has come out of Hollywood, and because of this expertness the film gains especial value". He also wrote that Richard Dix was "certainly at his best in this role". His only criticisms concerned the second half of the film, that he thought had "sagging moments" and an ending that was too abrupt. The Evening Independent called it "a notable addition to the small list of pictures that the years have given to the American theater. For in Cimarron is vested stirring drama, stark beauty, daring and adventure on a plane that is seldom seen on the screen." The West Seattle Herald declared that it was "even more powerful than the great story read by millions in America. Cimarron the picture is all that is gripping in Cimarron the story. Spectacular scenes abound in this production."

Elizabeth Yeaman of the Hollywood Daily Citizen saw the film as a new type of history, writing that, "Like history, the picture has moments of thrilling glory and moments of repetition and daily routine. Cimarron does not follow the rules of story construction... It is, in short, a graphic interpretation of a portion of history, the history of the state of Oklahoma from the time of the first great land rush until the present."

=== Retrospective reviews ===
More recent appraisals of the film have not been as positive. Steve Evans of DVD Verdict wrote in 2006, "Seen with contemporary eyes, the film is badly dated, slow moving, and pocked with racist caricatures....The recreation of the great 1889 Oklahoma Land Rush remains an exciting spectacle....Unfortunately, the film never manages to top this opening shot."

Assessing the film in 2009, James Berardinelli called it "an excellent study of how tastes have changed over the years. Critically lauded at the time of its release, Cimarron was beloved by most who saw it. Eight decades later, it is frequently cited on lists of the most undeserving Academy Award winners and is rightfully impugned for racist overtones and scattershot storytelling."

As of September 2023, Cimarron held a "Rotten" 52% rating on Rotten Tomatoes, based on 33 reviews, with a weighted average of 5.2/10. The site's consensus reads: "Cimarron is supported by a strong performance from Irene Dunne, but uneven in basically every other regard, and riddled with potentially offensive stereotypes."

== Awards and honors ==
At the 1931 Academy Awards ceremony at the Biltmore Hotel in Los Angeles, Cimarron was the first film to receive more than six Academy Awards nominations and be nominated for the Big Five awards (Best Picture, Best Director, Best Actor, Best Actress, and Best Writing). Additionally, it is one of only three films (the others being Who's Afraid of Virginia Woolf? and Sinners) to receive nominations in every eligible category. It won for three of them, including Best Picture. In 1946 it was joined by The Best Years of Our Lives as the only Best Picture Oscars won by RKO.

Cimarron was the first Western to win the Best Picture award, and remained the only Western genre film with that honor until 1990, when Dances With Wolves won.

1930–1931 Academy Awards

Category	Winner	Result
Outstanding Production	RKO Radio (William LeBaron, Producer)	Won
Best Director	Wesley Ruggles	Nominated
Best Actor	Richard Dix	Nominated
Best Actress	Irene Dunne	Nominated
Best Writing, Adaptation	Howard Estabrook	Won
Best Art Direction	Max Rée	Won
Best Cinematography	Edward Cronjager	Nominated
