= Midnight Mystery =

1930 film

- Swedish film poster
- Directed by: George B. Seitz
- Written by: Beulah Marie Dix
- Based on: The play, Hawk Island by Howard Irving Young
- Produced by: William LeBaron; Bertram Millhauser (assoc)
- Starring: Betty Compson
- Cinematography: Joseph Walker
- Edited by: Otto Ludwig
- Distributed by: RKO Pictures
- Release dates: May 30, 1930 (Premiere-New York City); June 1, 1930 (US)
- Running time: 65 minutes
- Country: United States
- Language: English

Midnight Mystery is a 1930 American pre-Code mystery film directed by George B. Seitz, from a screenplay by Beulah Marie Dix, which was adapted from the play Hawk Island by Howard Irving Young. Betty Compson starred, leading an ensemble cast which included Hugh Trevor, Lowell Sherman, Rita La Roy, Ivan Lebedeff, Raymond Hatton, June Clyde and Marcelle Corday.

== Plot ==
Gregory Sloane is a millionaire who lives in an isolated mansion on Hawk Island, off the coast of New England. He invites a disparate group of people to his home, who are soon cut off from the mainland when a fierce storm blows in. While confined, tensions erupt among the guests, leading to the murder of Mischa Kawelin.

One of the other guests, Sally Wayne, an author who writes murder mysteries and Sloane's fiancée, takes it upon herself to solve the crime. Over the course of the evening, she uncovers and strategically puts together all the clues, culminating in her getting the murderer to confess.

== Cast ==
- Betty Compson as Sally Wayne
- Hugh Trevor as Gregory Sloane
- Lowell Sherman as Tom Austen
- Rita La Roy as Madeline Austen
- Ivan Lebedeff as Mischa Kawelin
- Raymond Hatton as Paul Cooper
- Marcelle Corday as Harriet Cooper
- June Clyde as Louise Hollister
- Sidney D'Albrook as Barker

(cast list is per AFI Database)

== Notes ==
The play Hawk Island, from which this film was adapted, played at the Longacre Theatre in 1929, starring Clark Gable in the role of Gregory Sloane.
