= Gertrude Howard =

American actress (1892–1934)

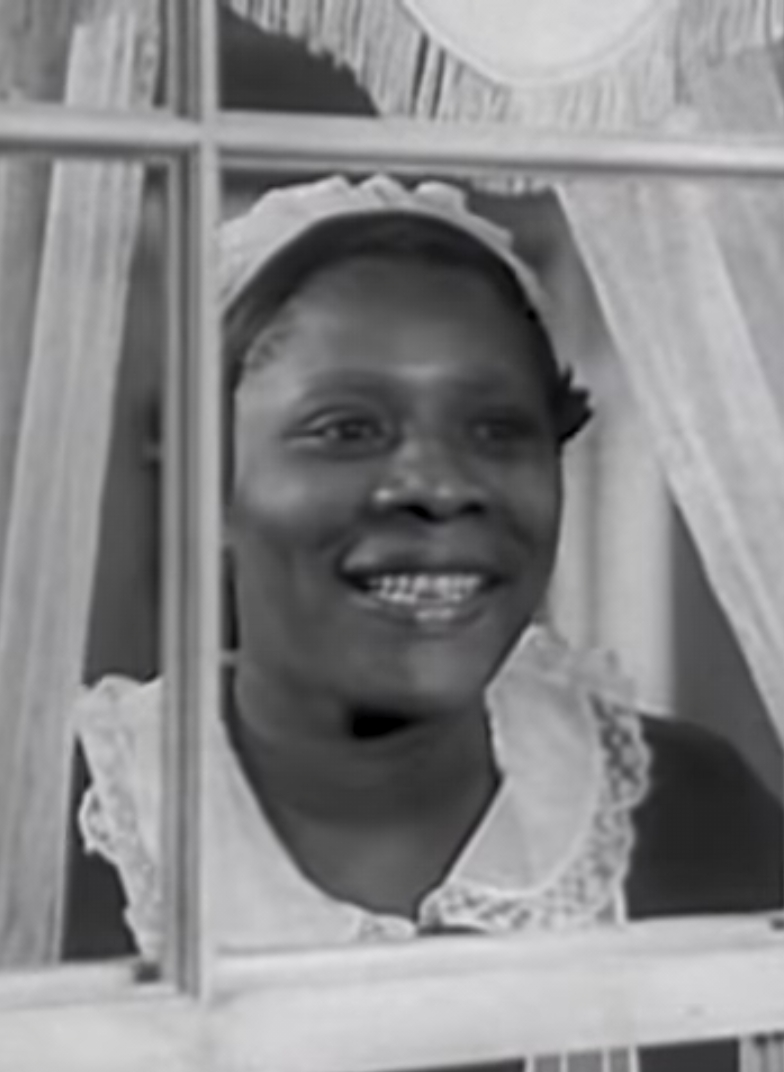
- Howard in Peck's Bad Boy (1934)
- Born: October 13, 1892; Hot Springs, Arkansas, U.S.
- Died: September 30, 1934 (aged 41); Los Angeles, California, U.S.
- Occupation: Actress
- Years active: 1925–1934

Gertrude Howard (October 13, 1892 – September 30, 1934) was an American actress of the silent and early sound film eras.

== Biography ==
Born in 1892, Howard performed in the chorus of The Wife Hunters (1911) on Broadway. She broke into films in 1925, appearing in The Circus Cyclone, directed by Albert Rogell. In 1927, she played the wife of Uncle Tom in Uncle Tom's Cabin. In 1927, The Pittsburgh Courier stated that she was the "highest salaried colored actress in Hollywood". She appeared mostly in minor or supporting film roles, such as Queenie in the original version of Show Boat (1929), and Martha in Christy Cabanne's Conspiracy.

Her appearance as Beulah Thorndyke in I'm No Angel (1933), led to her being forever linked to Mae West with the famous line, "Beulah, peel me a grape".

In Howard's short career she would appear in twenty-two films. That career was cut short by her untimely death in 1934 at the age of 41. Mae West helped raise funds for her funeral.

== Filmography ==
(Per AFI database)

- The Circus Cyclone (1925) as Mrs. Jackson
- Easy Pickings (1927) as Mandy
- On Your Toes (1927) as Mammy
- South Sea Love (1927) as Moana
- Uncle Tom's Cabin (1927) as Aunt Chloe
- Hearts in Dixie (1929) as Emmy
- Show Boat (1929) as Queenie (uncredited)
- His Captive Woman (1929) as Lavoris Smythe
- Synthetic Sin (1929) as Cassie
- Conspiracy (1930) as Martha
- Guilty? (1930) as Lucy
- Father's Son (1931) as Dinah
- The Prodigal (1931) as Naomi
- Penrod and Sam (1931) as Delia - Schofield's Maid (uncredited)
- Consolation Marriage (1931) as Kate - Mary's Maid (uncredited)
- Secret Service (1931) as Martha Polk (uncredited)
- Strangers in Love (1932) as Snowball, Servant
- Forbidden Trail (1932) as Angelina
- I'm No Angel (1933) as Beulah
- The Fighting Code (1933) as Housekeeper Martha
- George White's Scandals (1934) as Black Woman (uncredited)
- Peck's Bad Boy (1934) as Martha the Maid
- Carolina (1934) as Minor Role (uncredited)
