= Hugh Trevor =

American actor (1903–1933)

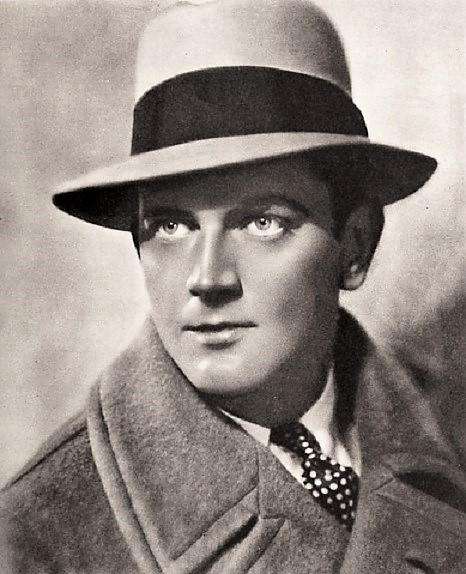
- Trevor in 1929
- Born: Hugh Trevor-Thomas; October 28, 1903; Yonkers, New York City, U.S.
- Died: November 10, 1933 (aged 30); Los Angeles, California, U.S.
- Occupation: Actor
- Years active: 1927–1933

Hugh Trevor (born Hugh Trevor-Thomas; October 28, 1903 – November 10, 1933) was an American actor whose short career began at the very end of the silent era in 1927. He would appear in nineteen films in the scant six years during which he was active. He did not fare well with the advent of talking pictures, and retired from the industry in 1931. His life was cut short when he unexpectedly died from complications following appendectomy surgery in 1933.

== Early life ==
Trevor was born on October 28, 1903, in Yonkers, New York. He studied at Harvard University. After college, he began a successful insurance business. In 1925, through his uncle, producer William LeBaron, he went to sell an insurance policy to Richard Dix, the film star. Dix was impressed by Trevor, and arranged for him to screen test, which Dix himself directed.

== Film career ==
Subsequent to his screen test, Trevor made his film debut in the 1927 film, Ranger of the North, where he played second fiddle to the dog star, Ranger. Although he would work for several studios, the bulk of his films were produced by F.B.O. Productions (FBO – also known as FBO Pictures Corporation), and later by RKO Radio Pictures, after FBO was merged with RCA to form RKO. While he never worked with Dix, he did work with other famous film figures of that era, including Mary Astor, Bryant Washburn, Chester Conklin, Noah Beery, the comedy team of Wheeler & Woolsey (Bert Wheeler and Robert Woolsey), Betty Compson, and Lowell Sherman. In 1929, Trevor was romantically linked with actress Aileen Pringle, following their working together on the film Beau Broadway the prior year. During his film career he was also romantically linked with another co-star, Betty Compson, who at one point was considering marrying him (after her divorce from James Cruze).

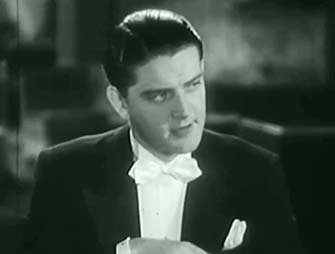
Trevor in the 1930 film, The Pay-Off

After the creation of RKO, Trevor would also work with his relative, William LeBaron. As the film industry transitioned into sound pictures, studios would create films in both sound and silent versions. Trevor's film, Love in the Desert, was one such film, and he and his co-star, Olive Borden, were featured in Photoplay magazine highlighting the new "Photophone" sound process. However, with the onset of talking pictures, his career began to fade, and he retired from the film industry in 1931, his last film being RKO's The Royal Bed.

== Later career and Death ==
After leaving films, he remained in Los Angeles, returning to the insurance industry, where he went into partnership with James Ryan, specialising in policies to those in the film industry. In 1933, less than two weeks after his thirtieth birthday, he suffered from appendicitis. He died of complications from the resulting appendectomy, and was buried in Hollywood Forever Cemetery.

== Filmography ==
(as per AFI's database)

Year	Title	Role	Silent (S)/Talkie (T)	Notes
1927	Ranger of the North	Bob Fleming	S	Lost film
1928	Beau Broadway	Killer Gordon	S	Lost film
1928	Dry Martini	Bobbie Duncan	S	Lost film
1928	Her Summer Hero	Kenneth Holmes	S	Lost film
1928	Hey Rube!	String	S	Lost film
1928	The Pinto Kid	Dan Logan	S	Lost film
1928	Red Lips	"Spike" Blair	S	Lost film
1928	Skinner's Big Idea	Jack McLaughlin	S	Lost film
1928	Taxi 13	Dan Regan	S	
1928	Wallflowers	Rufus	S	Lost film
1929	Love in the Desert	Bob Winslow	S & T	
1929	Night Parade	Bobby Murray	T	
1929	The Very Idea	Joe Garvin	T	
1930	Conspiracy	John Howell	T	
1930	The Cuckoos	Billy	T	
1930	Half Shot at Sunrise	Lieut. Jim Reed	T	
1930	Midnight Mystery	Gregory Sloane	T	
1930	The Pay-Off	Rocky	T	
1931	The Royal Bed	Crown Prince William	T	
