= Rockabye (1932 film) =

1932 film

- Cover of the DVD released in Spain
- Directed by: George Cukor
- Written by: Jane Murfin
- Based on: Rockabye; 1924 play by Lucia Bronder
- Produced by: David O. Selznick
- Starring: Constance Bennett; Joel McCrea
- Cinematography: Charles Rosher
- Edited by: George Hively
- Music by: Harry Akst; Jeanne Borlini; Nacio Herb Brown; Edward Eliscu
- Distributed by: RKO Pathé
- Release date: November 25, 1932
- Running time: 68 minutes
- Country: United States
- Language: English
- Budget: $600,000

Rockabye is a 1932 American pre-Code drama film starring Constance Bennett, Joel McCrea, and Paul Lukas. The final version was directed by George Cukor after studio executives decided that the original film as directed by George Fitzmaurice was unreleasable. The screenplay by Jane Murfin is based on an unpublished play written by Lucia Bronder, based on her original short story.

== Plot ==
When stage actress Judy Carroll testifies on behalf of her former lover, accused embezzler Al Howard, she loses custody of Elizabeth, an orphan she had planned to adopt. Her devoted manager Antonie "Tony" de Sola urges her to travel to Europe with her alcoholic mother Snooks to alleviate her emotional pain. While there she reads a play titled Rockabye, whose plot eerily resembles recent events in her life. Despite Tony's qualms, she is determined to star in a Broadway production.

Playwright Jacob Van Riker Pell is certain the sophisticated Judy will be unable to portray his heroine, a tough girl from Second Avenue, until she confesses that she was raised there herself. The two hit it off, and Judy convinces Tony to produce the play. On the verge of divorce, Jake proposes he and Judy wed as soon as he is free.

Jake fails to appear at the opening night party for Rockabye. His mother tells Judy that her daughter-in-law has just had a baby; she asks Judy to forget her son. When Jake finally arrives and assures her he still wants to marry her, Judy insists he return to his wife and newborn child. Devastated, she is comforted by Tony, who finally reveals his feelings for her.

== Cast ==
- Constance Bennett as Judy Carroll
- Joel McCrea as Jacob Van Riker Pell
- Paul Lukas as Tony de Sola
- Walter Pidgeon as Al Howard
- Jobyna Howland as Snooks Carroll
- Clara Blandick as Brida
- Walter Catlett as Jimmy Dunn
- Virginia Hammond as Mrs. Van Riker Pell
- J. M. Kerrigan as Fagin
- June Filmer as Elizabeth
- Veda Buckland as Mrs. Evans (uncredited)
- Richard Carle as Doc (uncredited)
- Lita Chevret as Party Guest (uncredited)
- Charles Dow Clark as Mr. Farley (uncredited)
- Sterling Holloway as Speakeasy Patron (uncredited)
- Virginia Howell as Mrs. Bronson (uncredited)
- Edgar Kennedy as Water Wagon-Driver (uncredited)
- Charles Middleton as District Attorney (uncredited)
- Bert Moorhouse as Speakeasy Patron (uncredited)
- Edwin Stanley as Defense Attorney (uncredited)
- Max Wagner as Reporter (uncredited)

== Production ==
RKO purchased the rights to the play from Gloria Swanson and hired George Fitzmaurice to direct the film adaptation. Anxious to accommodate exhibitors who were awaiting a new Constance Bennett film, the studio rushed the script into production with Phillips Holmes as the male lead. When the completed film was shown to executives, they declared it unreleasable and called in George Cukor to salvage it. The new director replaced Holmes with Joel McCrea and Laura Hope Crews, in the role of Judy's mother, with Jobyna Howland, reshot all their characters' scenes, added a new part for Walter Catlett and re-edited the balance of the film at a cost of $150,000, bringing the total cost to $600,000.

== Reception ==
The New York Times observed, "There are tears enough in Rockabye to drown a plot, a circumstance which is a form of mercy in the case of this particular plot . . . As for the performance of Miss Bennett, a conservative opinion would be that she is a better actress than Rockabye makes her seem . . . Joel McCrea as the young playwright is better than the lines he has to recite."

Although the reviews were poor, “Rockabye performed well at the box office, actually grossing slightly more than What Price Hollywood? (a “runaway box office hit”) in its first weeks of distribution, according to RKO records.”
