= The Gay Diplomat =

1931 film

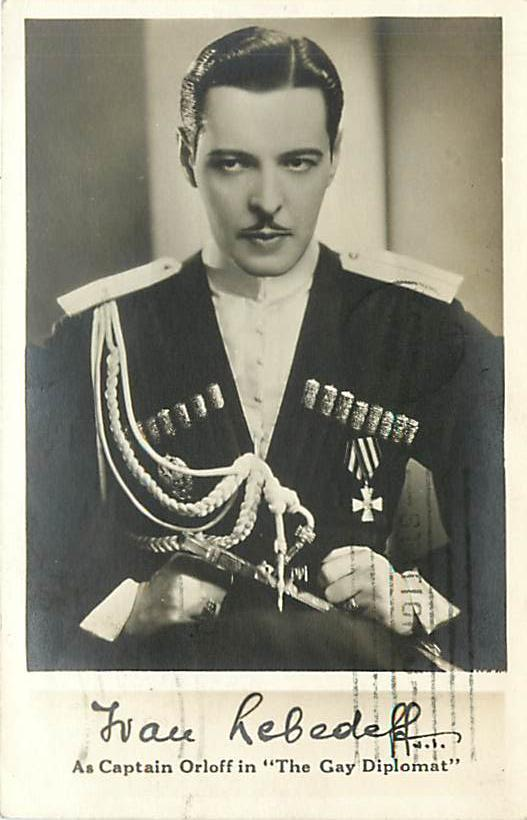
- Ivan Lebedeff as Captain Orloff
- Directed by: Richard Boleslawski; Ray Lissner (assistant)
- Written by: Benn W. Levy; Doris Anderson (adaptation and dialogue); Alfred Jackson (additional dialogue)
- Produced by: William LeBaron; Pandro S. Berman
- Starring: Ivan Lebedeff; Genevieve Tobin; Betty Compson
- Cinematography: Leo Tover
- Edited by: Arthur Roberts
- Music by: Max Steiner
- Distributed by: RKO Radio Pictures
- Release date: August 22, 1931
- Running time: 67 minutes
- Country: United States
- Language: English
- Budget: $184,000
- Box office: $131,000

The Gay Diplomat is a 1931 American pre-Code drama film. Directed by Richard Boleslawski for RKO Radio Pictures, it starred Ivan Lebedeff, Genevieve Tobin and Betty Compson.

== Plot ==
Captain Orloff is a Russian military officer who is sent to Bucharest to discover and dispose of a female spy. The three suspected spies are Countess Diana Dorchy, Baroness Alma Corri, and Madame Blinis. Before learning the identity of the spy, Orloff falls in love with Diana. In the course of events, the spy is revealed to be Alma who is ultimately tricked into confessing. Orloff returns with his prisoner to St. Petersburg and is joined on the train by Diana.

== Cast ==
- Genevieve Tobin as Countess Diana Dorchy
- Betty Compson as Baroness Alma Corri
- Ivan Lebedeff as Captain Ivan Orloff
- Ilka Chase as Madame Blinis
- Purnell Pratt as Colonel George Gorin
- Colin Campbell as Gamble
- Arthur Edmund Carew as The Suave Man
- Edward Martindel as Ambassador
- John St. Polis as General
- Judith Vosselli as Wife
- George Irving as A colonel
- Rita LaRoy as Natalie

== Production ==
According to the trade journal Film Daily, RKO reported the original story "Strange Women" was written by Lebedeff and Benn W. Levy. In addition to Strange Women, working titles included Woman Pursued and Kisses By Command.

Shooting took place in June 1931. Henry Hobart, the original production supervisor of Gay Diplomat, was so upset by the film's inadequacies and by Lebedeff's lack of star quality that he walked off the project. Pandro Berman replaced Hobart as supervising producer in mid-production, thus earning Berman his first screen credit.

The picture was Lebedeff's first starring role and he figured heavily in RKO's marketing campaign, which touted him as another Valentino and portrayed the story as based on events from his life. Tobin was borrowed from Universal to play the female lead.

== Reception ==
The film was released September 19, 1931. According to RKO records, the film was the studio's lowest grossing film of the 1930–31 season and lost $115,000 at the box office.

The Gay Diplomat was generally poorly received by critics. New York Times critic Mordaunt Hall called it "highly predictable". The Variety reviewer found the story incomprehensible and called the dialog "inane" and the acting "some of the poorest"; Film Daily, summed it up as "mechanical and slow moving ... with artificial treatment and acting".
