= The Fighting Code =

1933 film

- Theatrical release poster
- Directed by: Lambert Hillyer
- Screenplay by: Lambert Hillyer
- Starring: Buck Jones; Diane Sinclair; Ward Bond; Richard Alexander; Alfred P. James; Erville Alderson
- Cinematography: Allen G. Siegler
- Edited by: Clarence Kolster
- Production company: Columbia Pictures
- Distributed by: Columbia Pictures
- Release date: December 30, 1933
- Running time: 65 minutes
- Country: United States
- Language: English

The Fighting Code is a 1933 American Western film written and directed by Lambert Hillyer. The film stars Buck Jones, Diane Sinclair, Ward Bond, Richard Alexander, Alfred P. James and Erville Alderson. The film was released on December 30, 1933, by Columbia Pictures.

== Cast ==
- Buck Jones as Ben Halliday (as Charles 'Buck' Jones)
- Diane Sinclair as Helen James
- Ward Bond as Joe Krull
- Richard Alexander as Sheriff Olson (as Dick Alexander)
- Alfred P. James as Judge Williams (as Alf James)
- Erville Alderson as Joshua La Plante (as Erville Anderson)
- Gertrude Howard as Housekeeper Martha
- Louis Natheaux as Barry
- Niles Welch as Crosby (uncredited)
- Bob Kortman as Carter (uncredited)
- Charles Brinley as Betts (uncredited)
