= Ivan Lebedeff =

Russian actor (1894–1953)

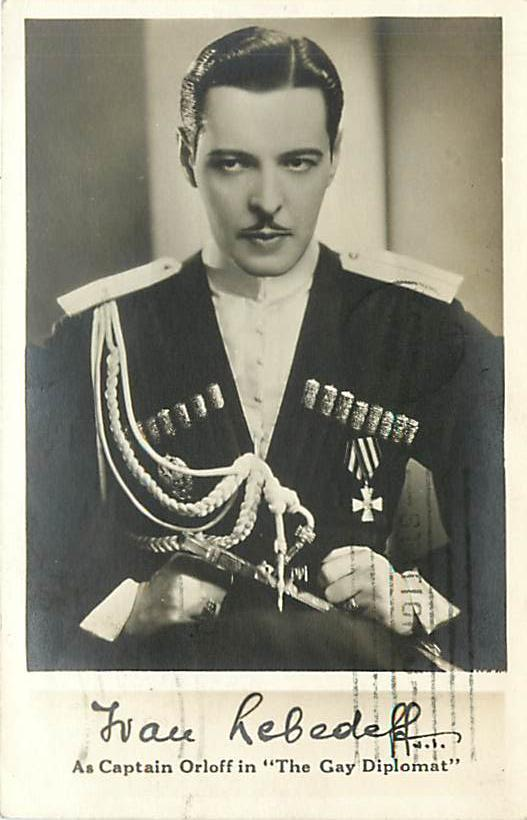
- Born: Ivan Basil Lebedeff; 18 June 1894; Ushpol, Kovno Governorate, Russian Empire
- Died: 31 March 1953 (aged 58); Los Angeles, California, U.S.
- Occupation: Actor
- Years active: 1926-1953
- Spouse: Wera Engels (1941–1953)

Ivan Lebedeff (born Ivan Vasilyevich Lebedev (Russian: Ива́н Васи́льевич Ле́бедев), 18 June 1894 – 31 March 1953) was a Russian film actor, lecturer and writer. He appeared in 66 films between 1926 and 1953. In 1940, his novel, Legion of Dishonor, was published.

== Biography ==
Lebedeff was born in Ushpol, now Užpaliai, then part of the Russian Empire, now Lithuania, on 18 June 1894. He migrated to the United States in 1925 and in 1930 was recorded at Los Angeles as an actor.

On 15 August 1937, he was recorded as re-entering the United States from Mexico, when it was noted that he had resided in the U. S. between 2 October 1925 and 14 October 1930, and again between 20 April 1932, and 13 August 1937. His closest relation was given as his sister Nathalie Lebedeff, of Nice, in the south of France.

On 12 November 1937, he was naturalized in the U.S. District Court for the Southern District of California. In 1944, he campaigned on behalf of Governor Thomas Dewey, Republican presidential candidate.

He died on 31 March 1953, in Los Angeles, California, from a heart attack.

== Partial filmography ==
- Fine Manners (1926) - The Prince (uncredited)
- The Sorrows of Satan (1926) - Amiel
- The Love of Sunya (1927) - Ted Morgan
- The Angel of Broadway (1927) - Lonnie
- The Forbidden Woman (1927) - Sheik
- Let 'Er Go Gallegher (1928) - Stephen B. Hade AKA Four Fingers Dan
- Walking Back (1928) - Beaut Thibaut
- Sin Town (1929) - Pete Laguerro
- The Veiled Woman (1929) - Capt. Paul Fevier
- The One Woman Idea (1929) - Hosainn
- Street Girl (1929) - Prince Nicholaus of Aregon
- They Had to See Paris (1929) - Marquis de Brissac
- Men Without Women (1930) - Man in Bar with Top Hat (uncredited)
- The Cuckoos (1930) - Baron de Camp
- Midnight Mystery (1930) - Mischa Kawelin
- Conspiracy (1930) - Butch Miller
- The Lady Refuses (1931) - Nikolai Rabinoff
- Laugh and Get Rich (1931) - Count Dimitriff (uncredited)
- Bachelor Apartment (1931) - Pedro De Maneau
- The Gay Diplomat (1931) - Captain Ivan Orloff
- Unholy Love (1932) - Alex Stockmar
- Sweepings (1933) - Prince Niko Gilitziv (uncredited)
- Made on Broadway (1933) - Ramon Salinas
- Laughing at Life (1933) - Don Flavio Montenegro
- Bombshell (1933) - Marquis
- Moulin Rouge (1934) - Ramon
- The Merry Frinks (1934) - Ramon Alvarez
- Kansas City Princess (1934) - Dr. Sascha Pilnakoff
- Strange Wives (1934) - Dimitri
- Sweepstake Annie (1935) - Baron Rudolph Baritska
- Goin' to Town (1935) - Ivan Valadov
- China Seas (1935) - Ngah
- She Couldn't Take It (1935) - Count (uncredited)
- The Golden Arrow (1936) - Count Guilliano
- Pepper (1936) - Baron Von Stofel
- Love on the Run (1936) - Igor
- Mama Steps Out (1937) - Coco Duval - the Painter
- Fair Warning (1937) - Count Andre Lukacha
- History Is Made at Night (1937) - Michael Browsky
- Maytime (1937) - Empress' Dinner Companion (uncredited)
- Atlantic Flight (1937) - Baron Hayygard
- Angel (1937) - Prince Vladimir Gregorovitch (scenes deleted)
- Conquest (1937) - Cossack Captain (uncredited)
- Wise Girl (1937) - Prince Michael
- Straight Place and Show (1938) - Ivan Borokov - Russian Jockey
- You Can't Cheat an Honest Man (1939) - Ronnie (uncredited)
- The Mystery of Mr. Wong (1939) - Michael Strogonoff
- Trapped in the Sky (1939) - Dure
- Hotel for Women (1939) - Galdos (uncredited)
- Passport to Alcatraz (1940) - Bogen
- Public Deb No. 1 (1940) - Feodor
- The Shanghai Gesture (1941) - The Gambler
- Blue, White and Perfect (1942) - Alexis Fournier
- Lure of the Islands (1942) - The Commandant
- Foreign Agent (1942) - Okura
- Journey into Fear (1943) - Witness (uncredited)
- Mission to Moscow (1943) - Mr. Rosengoltz (uncredited)
- Around the World (1943) - Menlo (uncredited)
- Are These Our Parents? (1944) - Alexis Dolan
- Oh, What a Night (1944) - Boris
- Rhapsody in Blue (1945) - Nightclub Guest (uncredited)
- Heartbeat (1946) - Thief at Ball (uncredited)
- California Conquest (1952) - Alexander Rotcheff
- The Snows of Kilimanjaro (1952) - Marquis (uncredited)
- The War of the Worlds (1953) - Dr. Gratzman (uncredited)
