= Kept Husbands =

1931 film by Lloyd Bacon

- DVD front
- Directed by: Lloyd Bacon
- Written by: Louis Sarecky (writer); Forrest Halsey (adaptation); Alfred Jackson (adaptation)
- Produced by: William LeBaron; Louis Sarecky (associate)
- Starring: Dorothy Mackaill; Joel McCrea
- Cinematography: Jack MacKenzie
- Edited by: George Marsh; Ann McKnight
- Music by: Max Steiner
- Production company: Radio Pictures
- Distributed by: Radio Pictures
- Release date: February 22, 1931 (US)
- Running time: 76 minutes
- Country: United States
- Language: English

Kept Husbands is a 1931 American pre-Code drama film directed by Lloyd Bacon, starring Dorothy Mackaill and Joel McCrea, with major supporting roles filled by Robert McWade, Florence Roberts and Mary Carr. The original story was written by the film's associate producer, Louis Sarecky, and adapted for the screen by Forrest Halsey and Alfred Jackson. Although primarily a drama, the film has many comedic touches to it. The film centers around the class struggles and stereotypes between the working class and the wealthy, which was particularly striking during the Depression era when this film was made. The film also points out the stereotypical gender roles which were prevalent at that time.

== Plot ==
Full film

Arthur Parker is a wealthy steel magnate who is relating the story to his snobbish wife and spoiled daughter of one of his plant supervisors who fearlessly rushed in and saved the lives of two of his fellow co-workers. When his wife, Henrietta, asks if he rewarded the young man, Parker shows his astonishment by saying that the hero had refused the thousand dollars he had offered. When the daughter, Dot, remarks that she would like to meet a man like that, the father tells her not to worry, she will, for he is coming to dinner that very evening. Henrietta is aghast at having to socialize with someone not of their class, but Parker, who is a better judge of character, assures her that all will be well.

During dinner, Dot is smitten with the young man, Dick Brunton. She makes a bet with her father that she can get him to marry her within four weeks. The father takes that bet, and lo and behold she wins Dick's heart and gets him to accept her proposal of marriage by the deadline, despite his fears of their different social circumstances.

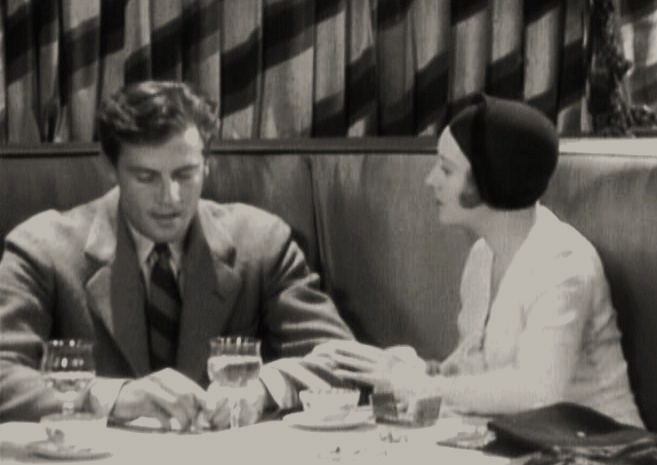
Joel McCrea and Dorothy Mackaill in a scene from the film.

After the wedding, Parker sends the newlyweds on an expensive honeymoon to Europe, after which they return to their lavish home, also supplied by Parker. Parker also promotes Dick, but within six months, his new lifestyle threatens to emasculate Dick, who loses interest in his career and finds himself dominated by Dot's vapid, social whirl of bridge games, cocktail parties and passive acceptance of life as a "kept husband". This does not sit well with the proud husband, and when Parker offers him a chance to prove himself with a new position in St. Louis, he jumps at the chance. When told of the opportunity however, Dot is less than enthusiastic, not wanting to leave her friends and social circle. She refuses to agree to accompany Dick.

Dick decides to go to St. Louis, with or without Dot, making her incredibly upset. Not knowing what to do, he goes to ask advice from his mother, who tells him that he needs to reconcile with Dot before he leaves for St. Louis. Meanwhile, Dot has agreed to meet with a former beau, Charles Bates, who attempts to seduce her. When she returns to their house the following morning, Dick questions her regarding her whereabouts. She lies to him, and he knows it, since he had seen her with Bates the prior evening. Furious, he storms out, saying their marriage is over, and intending to resign from Parker's company.

Realizing her love for him, Dot eventually finds Dick at the rail station, about to leave for St. Louis. He has decided to take Parker's position after all. The husband and wife reconcile, with Dot agreeing to live within the means that Dick's salary can provide.

== Cast ==
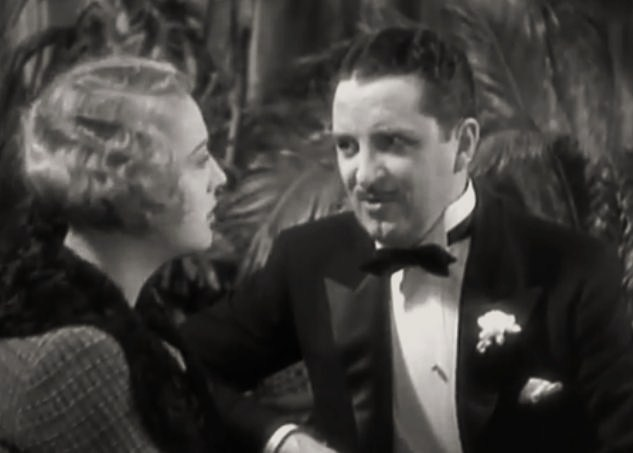
Dorothy Mackaill-Bryant Washburn in Kept Husbands

- Dorothy Mackaill as Dorothea "Dot" Parker Brunton
- Joel McCrea as Richard "Dick" Brunton
- Ned Sparks as Hughie Hanready
- Mary Carr as Mrs. Brunton
- Clara Kimball Young as Mrs. Henrietta Post
- Robert McWade as Arthur Parker
- Bryant Washburn as Charlie Bates
- Florence Roberts as Mrs. Henrietta Parker
- Freeman Wood as Mr. Post
- Lita Chevret as Gwen

(Cast list as per AFI database)

== Soundtrack ==
- "The Wedding March", written by Felix Mendelssohn-Bartholdy
- "Three Little Words", written by Bert Kalmar and Harry Ruby - whistled by Joel McCrea

== Notes ==
In 1959, the film entered the public domain in the United States because the claimants did not renew its copyright registration in the 28th year after publication.

The tag line for the film was "Every Inch a Man - Bought Body and Soul by His Wife".

This film marked the debut in sound films of Clara Kimball Young, who had been a major star during the silent film era. She came back after a six-year hiatus from making films.
