= The Very Idea =

1929 film

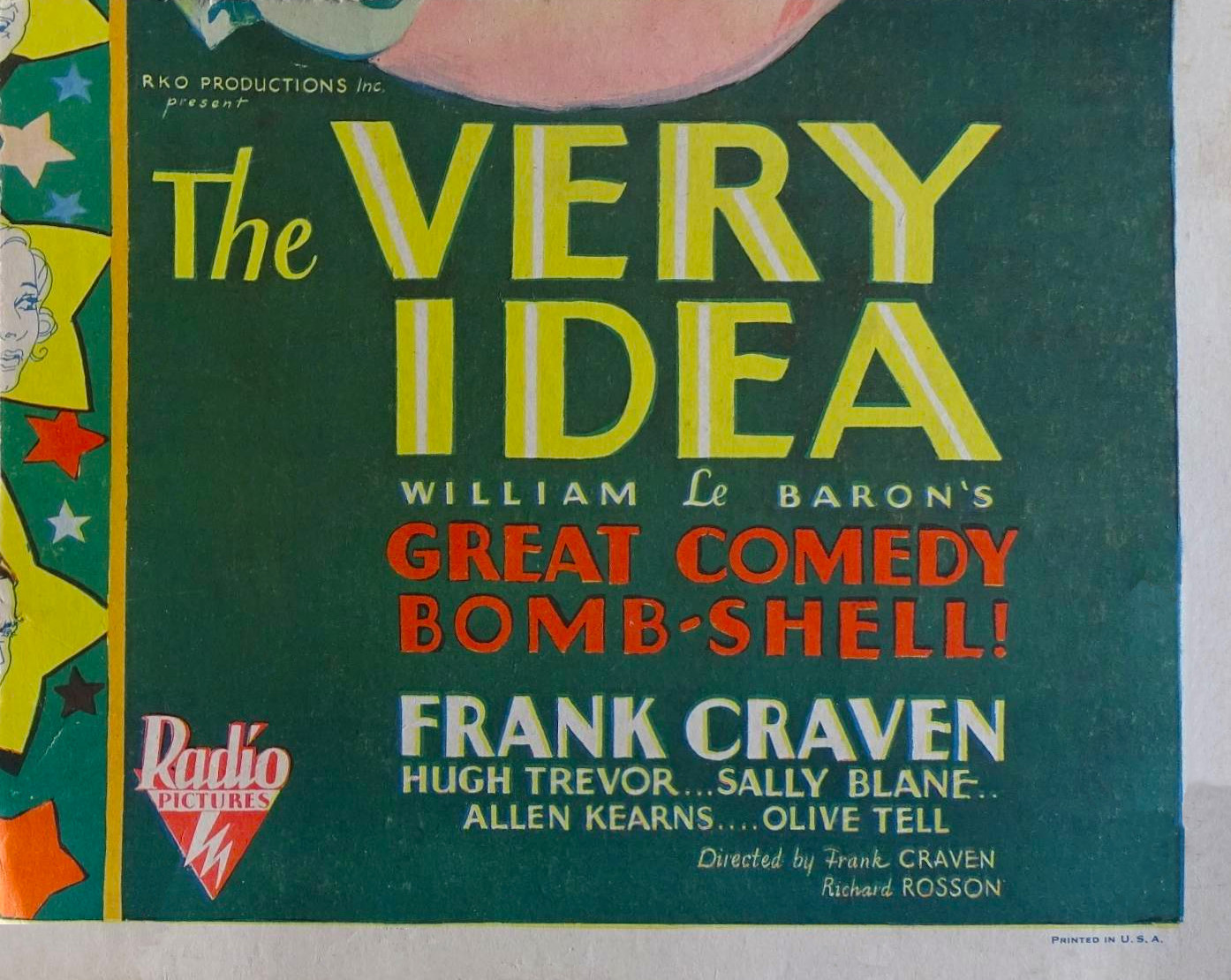
- Partial of the theatrical release poster
- Directed by: Richard Rosson; Frank Craven
- Screenplay by: William LeBaron
- Produced by: Myles Connolly
- Starring: Sally Blane; Hugh Trevor; Allen Kearns; Doris Eaton; Frank Craven
- Cinematography: Leo Tover
- Edited by: Ann McKnight; George Marsh
- Production company: RKO Pictures
- Distributed by: RKO Pictures
- Release dates: August 24, 1929 (Premiere-New York); September 15, 1929 (United States)
- Running time: 65 minutes
- Country: United States
- Language: English

The Very Idea is an American comedy film directed by Frank Craven and Richard Rosson and written by William LeBaron, based on his play of the same title. Released in 1929, it was the fourth film released by RKO Pictures, starring Sally Blane, Hugh Trevor, Allen Kearns, Doris Eaton, and Frank Craven. A comedy based on the theory of eugenics, it was a critical and financial failure.

The play was filmed before in 1920 as a silent starring Taylor Holmes. The 1920 film is lost.

== Plot ==
Alan Camp has written a book on eugenics, and is looking to prove his theories. His sister, Edith Goodhue, and her husband, Gilbert have been frustrated for years with their inability to have children. Alan convinces them to let him create a child through eugenics for them to adopt. Chosen to be the parents of this eugenic child are Joe Garvin, who happens to be Alan's chauffeur, and Nora, the Goodhues' maid. The two are offered $15,000 each if they conceive and deliver a child within twelve months, to which they agree.

To give the young couple room to move ahead with the plan, the Goodhues leave on a year trip to California. Nora and Joe do have the baby, but have fallen in love in the interim and have decided to keep the child. When the Goodhues return from California, they find their home has been converted into a nursery, occupied by Mr. and Mrs. Garvin, who have married. They will not give up their baby, and Alan frantically sends Joe to a local orphanage in order to find a replacement baby. However, the child Joe returns with is rejected by Edith and Gilbert. Despondent, Alan decides to have the nursery dismantled, when Mrs. Goodhue announces that she is pregnant.

== Cast ==
- Sally Blane as Nora
- Hugh Trevor as Joe Garvin
- Allen Kearns as Gilbert Goodhue
- Doris Eaton as Edith Goodhue
- Frank Craven as Alan Camp
- Theodore von Eltz as George Green
- Olive Tell as Marion Green
- Adele Watson as Miss Duncan

== Censorship ==
When The Very Idea was released, many states and cities in the United States had censor boards that could require cuts or other eliminations before the film could be shown. The Chicago Board of Censors banned showing of the film.

== See also ==
- List of early sound feature films (1926–1929)
