= Hey Rube! =

1928 film

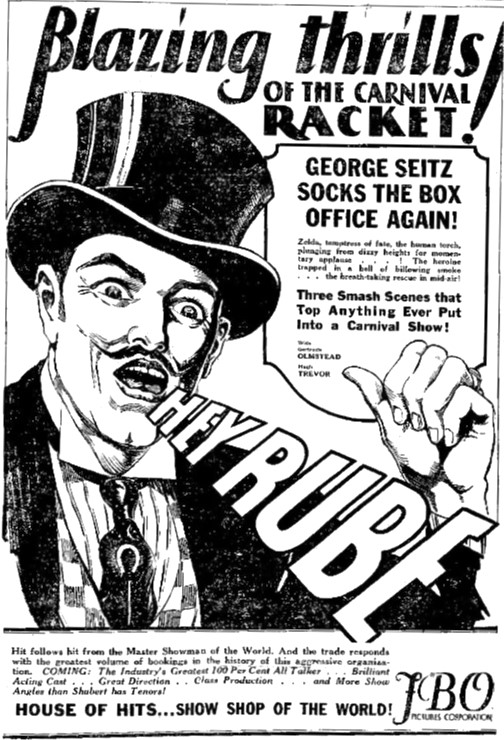
- Newspaper advertisement
- Directed by: George B. Seitz; Thomas Atkins (assistant)
- Written by: Wyndham Gittens; Louis Sarecky
- Starring: Hugh Trevor
- Cinematography: Robert Martin
- Edited by: Ann McKnight
- Production company: Film Booking Offices of America
- Distributed by: Film Booking Offices of America
- Release date: December 22, 1928
- Running time: 60 minutes
- Country: United States
- Language: Silent (English intertitles)

Hey Rube! is a 1928 American silent drama film directed by George B. Seitz.

== Cast ==
- Hugh Trevor as String
- Gertrude Olmstead as Lutie
- Ethlyne Clair as Zelda
- Bert Moorhouse as Moffatt (credited as Bert Moorehouse)
- Walter McGrail as Duke

== Preservation ==
With no prints of Hey Rube! located in any film archives, it is a lost film.
