= Peck's Bad Boy (1934 film) =

1934 film

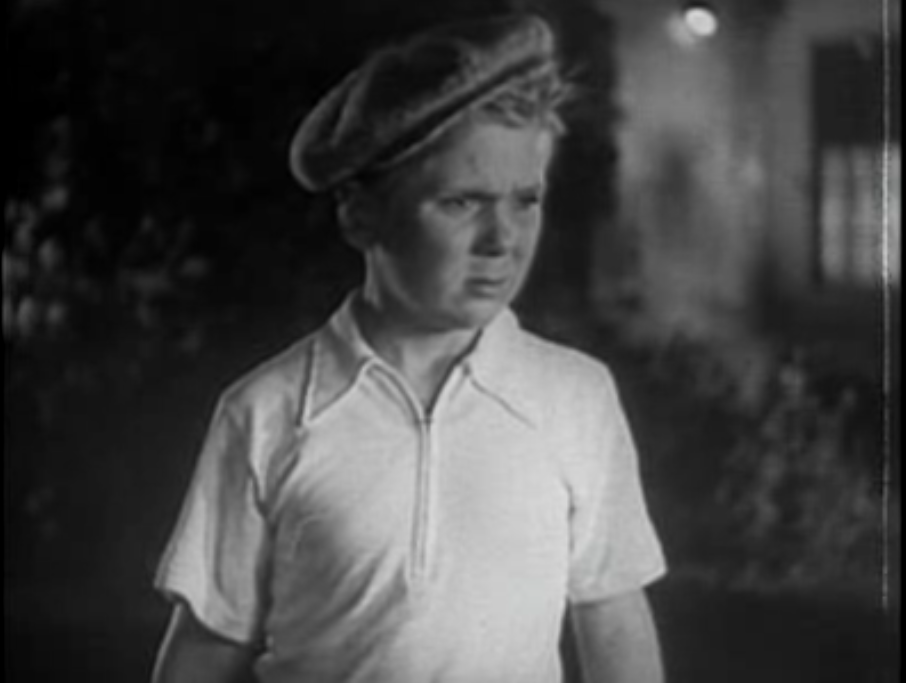
- Jackie Cooper as Bill Peck
- Directed by: Edward F. Cline
- Written by: Marguerite Roberts (writer); Bernard Schubert (writer)
- Based on: Peck's Bad Boy and His Pa by George W. Peck
- Produced by: Sol Lesser
- Starring: See below
- Cinematography: Frank B. Good
- Edited by: W. Donn Hayes
- Music by: Hugo Riesenfeld
- Production company: Sol Lesser Productions
- Distributed by: Fox Film
- Release date: August 31, 1934
- Running time: 70 minutes
- Country: United States
- Language: English

The full film

Peck's Bad Boy is a 1934 American adventure comedy-drama film directed by Edward F. Cline. It was based on the series of books by George W. Peck.

== Cast ==
- Jackie Cooper as Bill Peck
- Thomas Meighan as Henry Peck
- Jackie Searl as Horace Clay
- Dorothy Peterson as Aunt Lily Clay
- O.P. Heggie as Duffy
- Charles E. Evans as Minister
- Gertrude Howard as Martha, The Maid
- Larry Wheat as Master of Ceremonies
- Harvey Clark as Spectator

== Soundtrack ==
- "Father and Son" (Music by Hugo Riesenfeld, lyrics by Herbert Stahlberg)

== See also ==
- Peck's Bad Boy with the Circus
