= Her Summer Hero =

1928 film

- Directed by: James Dugan
- Written by: Gertrude Orr; Jean Dupont Miller; Randolph Bartlett
- Produced by: Film Booking Offices of America
- Starring: Sally Blane; Hugh Trevor
- Cinematography: Philip Tannura
- Edited by: Archie Marshek
- Distributed by: Film Booking Offices of America
- Release date: February 12, 1928
- Running time: 60 minutes
- Country: USA
- Language: Silent..English intertitles

Her Summer Hero is a lost 1928 silent film comedy drama directed by James Dugan and starring Sally Blane, Hugh Trevor and Harold Goodwin.

== Cast ==
- Hugh Trevor - Kenneth Holmes
- Harold Goodwin - Herb Darrow
- Duane Thompson - Joan Stanton
- James Pierce - Chris
- Cleve Moore - Al Stanton
- Sally Blane - Grave
