= Night Parade =

1929 film directed by Malcolm St. Clair

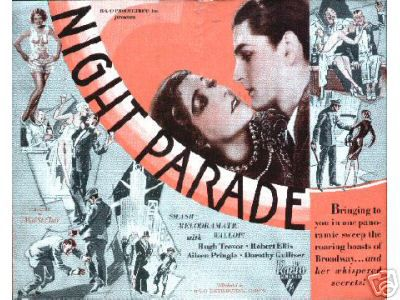
- Film poster for Night Parade
- Directed by: Malcolm St. Clair
- Screenplay by: James Gruen; George O'Hara
- Based on: the play, Ringside by Hyatt Dabb; Edward Paramore, Jr. George Abbot
- Produced by: William Le Baron
- Starring: Hugh Trevor; Aileen Pringle; Dorothy Gulliver; Robert Ellis
- Cinematography: William Marshall
- Edited by: Jack Kitchen
- Production company: RKO Pictures
- Distributed by: RKO Pictures
- Release date: October 27, 1929 (US)
- Running time: 71 minutes
- Country: United States
- Language: English

Night Parade is a 1929 American pre-Code drama film directed by Malcolm St. Clair based on the play Ringside by Hyatt Daab, Edward Paramore, Jr. and George Abbott. Released by RKO Pictures in October 1929, it starred Hugh Trevor, Aileen Pringle, Dorothy Gulliver and Robert Ellis.

== Plot ==
The film

Bobby Murray is the middleweight champion, managed by his father, Tom. He is expected to lose an upcoming fight in defense of his title. A local sportswriter, Sid Durham, also thinks he will lose, but he has high regard for Tom. A gangster, John Zelli, also feels that Murray will lose, but wants to ensure that fact. Zelli enlists the talents of sultry Paula Vernoff to seduce Bobby and get him to agree to throw the fight.

Over the course of several meetings between Paula and Bobby, she eventually, through seduction and alcohol, gets him to agree to purposely lose. Durham, through his connections, learns of Zelli's plot, and tells Tom what Bobby agreed to. Tom confronts Bobby, who confesses, after which he learns that a childhood friend, Doris O'Connell, for whom he always had feelings, also has feelings for him.

Unsure of what to do, Bobby goes to the fight. Meanwhile, his father, Tom, goes to have a little meeting with Zelli, and makes sure that Zelli will not bother Bobby again. As the fight progresses, Bobby is on the verge of losing. But as he is knocked to the canvas a last time, he sees his father and Doris arrive ringside, giving him the courage to get up and win the fight.

== Cast ==
- Aileen Pringle as Paula Vernoff
- Hugh Trevor as Bobby Martin
- Dorothy Gulliver as Doris O'Connell
- Robert Ellis as John W. Zelli
- Ann Pennington as Dancer
- Lloyd Ingraham as Tom Murray
- Lee Shumway as Sid Durham
- Charles Sullivan as Huffy

== Notes ==
The film was also released by RKO as a silent film.

The film was known as Sporting Life in Great Britain, and La Più Bella Vittoria in Italy.

== See also ==
- List of boxing films
- List of early sound feature films (1926–1929)
