= Rio Rita (1929 film) =

1929 film

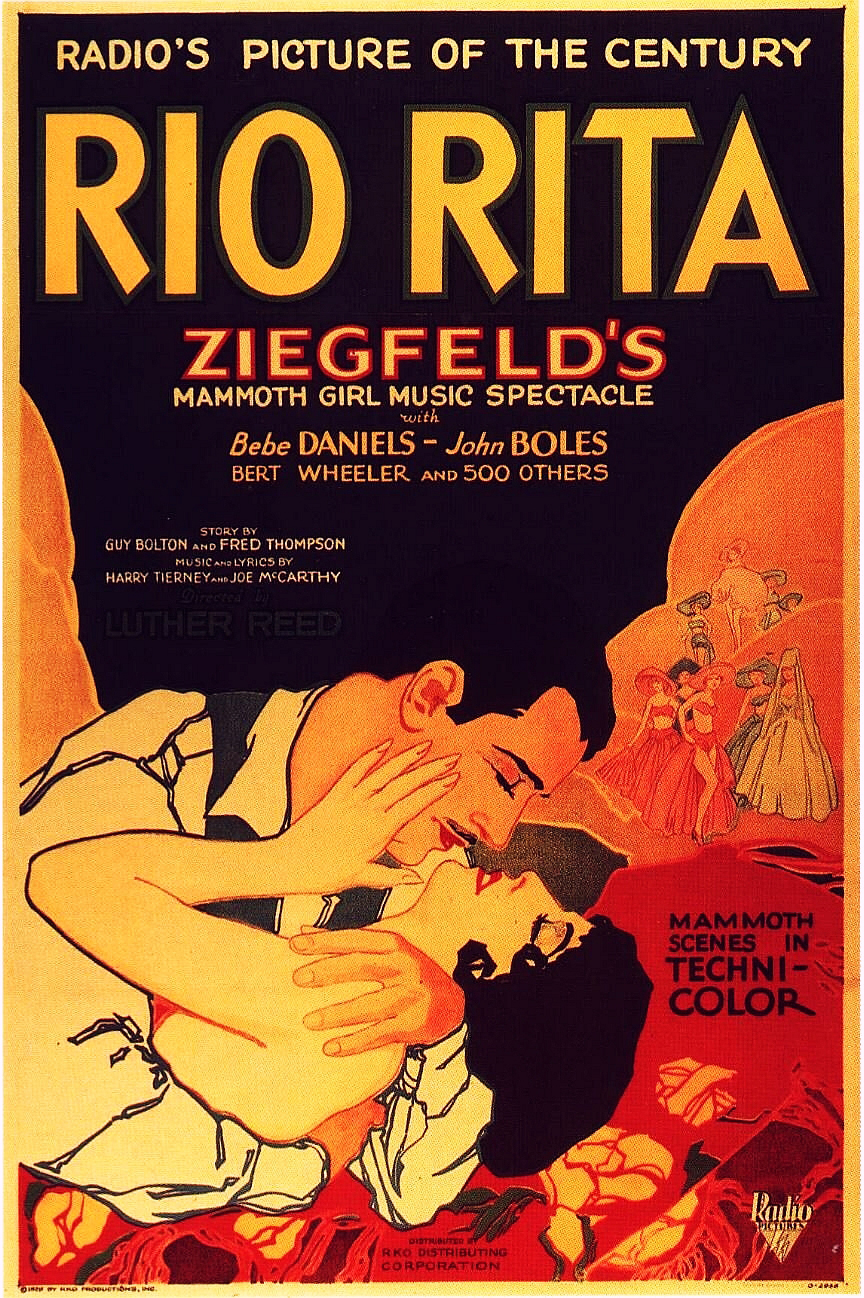
- Theatrical release poster
- Directed by: Luther Reed
- Written by: Luther Reed
- Based on: Rio Rita; 1927 play by Guy Bolton; Frederick A. Thompson
- Produced by: William LeBaron; Florenz Ziegfeld Jr.
- Starring: Bebe Daniels; John Boles; Bert Wheeler; Robert Woolsey; Dorothy Lee
- Cinematography: Robert Kurrle (Technicolor); Lloyd Knechtel
- Edited by: William Hamilton
- Music by: Victor Baravalle (director); Joseph McCarthy (lyrics); Harry Tierney (music)
- Color process: Black and white Two-color Technicolor (finale only)
- Production company: RKO Radio Pictures
- Distributed by: RKO Radio Pictures
- Release date: September 15, 1929
- Running time: Original release: 141 minutes; Surviving reissue: 103 minutes
- Country: United States
- Language: English
- Budget: $678,000
- Box office: $2,400,000

Rio Rita is a 1929 American pre-Code RKO musical comedy starring Bebe Daniels and John Boles along with the comedy team of Wheeler & Woolsey (Bert Wheeler and Robert Woolsey in their first starring role in a film). The film is based on the 1927 stage musical produced by Florenz Ziegfeld, which originally united Wheeler and Woolsey as a team and made them famous. The film was the biggest and most expensive RKO production of 1929 as well as the studio's biggest box office hit until King Kong (1933). Its finale was photographed in two-color Technicolor. Rio Rita was chosen as one of the 10 best films of 1929 by Film Daily.

== Plot ==
Rio Rita (1929; 1932 re-release cut version)

Chick Bean, a New York bootlegger who comes to the Mexican town of San Lucas to get a divorce so he can marry Dolly. After the wedding, Ned Lovett, Chick's lawyer, informs Chick the divorce was invalid, and advises Wheeler to stay away from his bride.

Rita Ferguson, a south-of-the-border beauty pursued by both Texas Ranger Jim Stewart and local warlord General Ravinoff. Ranger Jim is pursuing the notorious bandit Kinkajou along the Mexico–United States border, but is reluctant to openly accuse Rita's brother, Roberto, as the Kinkajou because he is in love with Rita.

Ravinoff successfully convinces Rita to spurn Ranger Jim on the pretext that Jim will arrest Roberto. Rita unhappily agrees to marry Ravinoff to prevent him from exposing Roberto as the Kinkajou. Meanwhile, Bean's first wife, Katie, shows up to accuse him of bigamy, but conveniently falls in love with Lovett.

At this point, the film switches into Technicolor. During the wedding ceremony aboard Ravinoff's private gambling barge, Ranger Jim cuts the craft's ropes so that it drifts north of the Rio Grande. The Texas Rangers storm the barge, arrest Ravinoff as the real Kinkajou just in time to prevent the wedding, and Roberto is revealed to be a member of the Mexican Secret Service. Jim takes Rita's hand in marriage and Roberto escorts Ravinoff back to Mexico for trial.

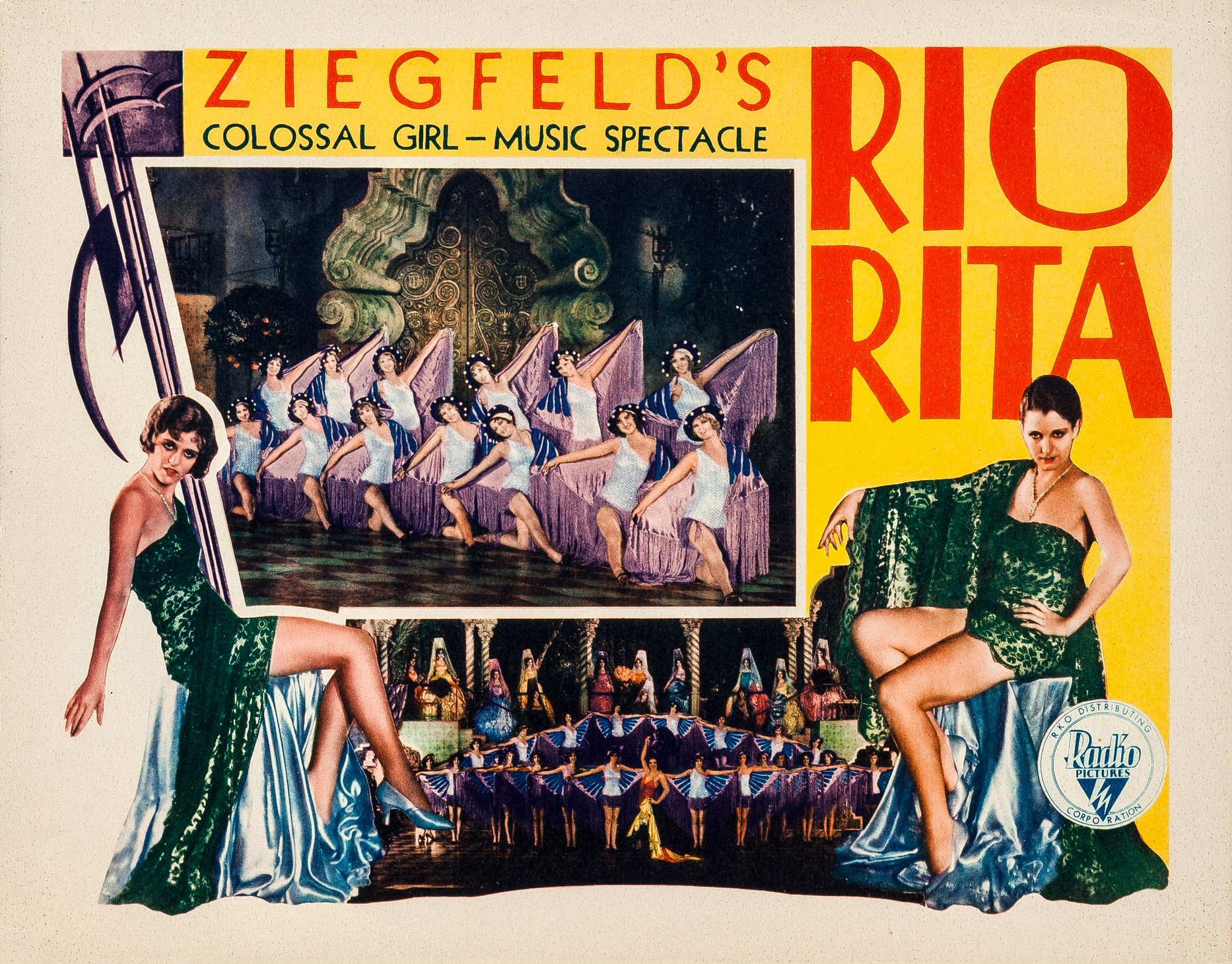

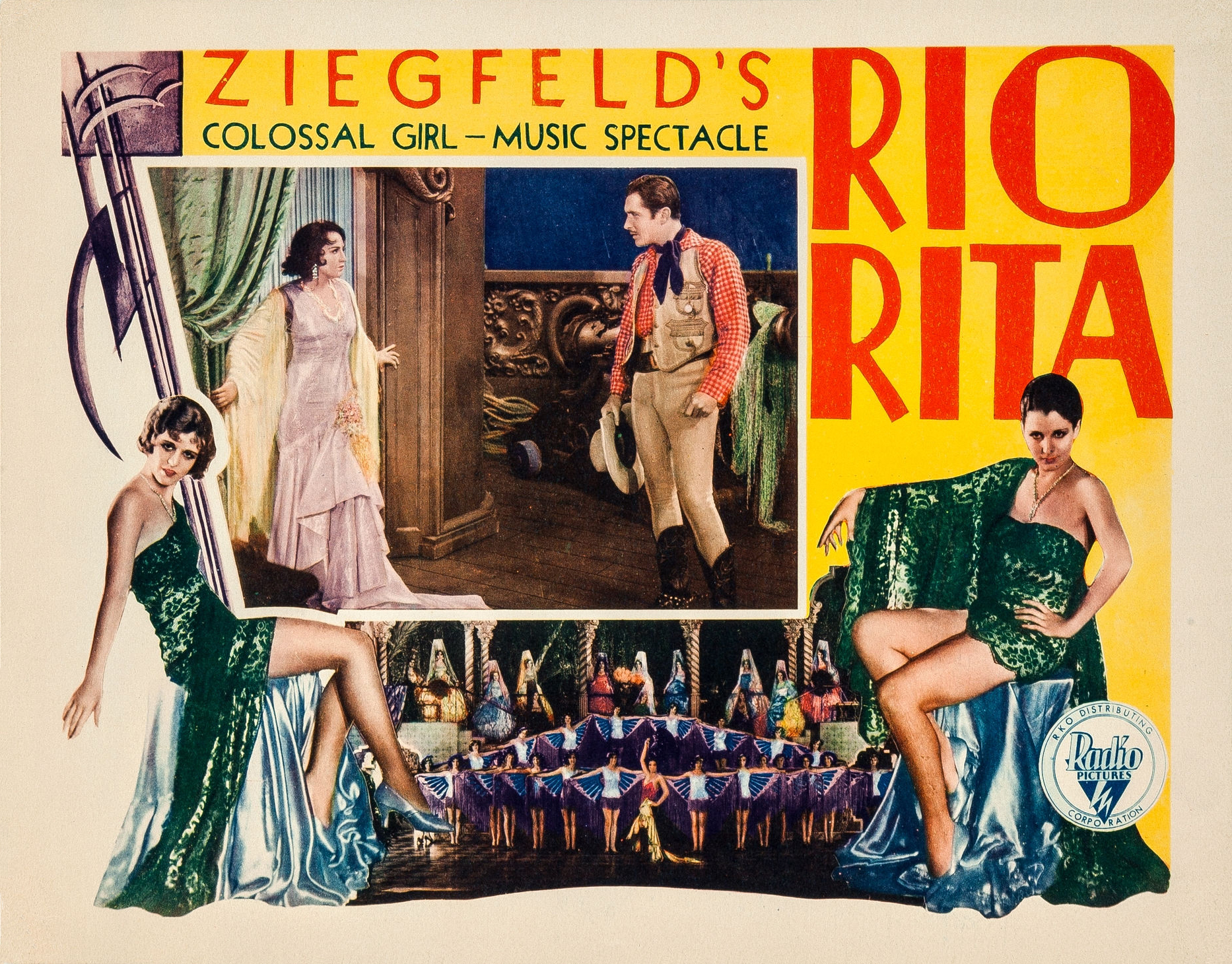

== Cast ==
- Bebe Daniels as Rita Ferguson
- John Boles as Capt. Jim Stewart
- Bert Wheeler as Chick Bean
- Robert Woolsey as Ned Lovett
- Dorothy Lee as Dolly Bean
- Don Alvarado as Roberto Ferguson
- Georges Renavent as General Ravinoff

== Production notes ==
- The choreography for the grand finale on the barge was created by Pearl Eaton.
- The 1942 Abbott and Costello "remake" has little in common with this version. Two songs, "Rio Rita" and "The Ranger's Song", are presented again, but the MGM film's storyline is so different that the screenplay is credited as an original work.
- A version for television was produced by NBC in 1950.

== Songs ==
- "You're Always in My Arms (But Only in My Dreams)"
- "Sweetheart We Need Each Other"
- "Following the Sun Around"
- "Rio Rita"
- "If You're in Love You'll Waltz"
- "The Kinkajou"
- "The Rangers' Song"

== Release and reception ==
Rio Rita was a box-office success. Earning an estimated profit of $935,000, it was RKO's biggest grossing film of 1929. It was also generally well received by critics. In its review of the film at the time, Photoplay praises it as nearly "the finest of the screen musicals" and commends director Reed for managing well a "difficult assignment". However, Mordaunt Hall, critic for The New York Times in 1929, expresses disappointment with Reed's direction. "(He) has contented himself in making virtually an audible animated photographic conception of the successful Ziegfeld show," writes Hall, who notes too that Daniels, though capable, was "not up to the standard set by Ethlin Terry in the stage version". Hall does, however, express an appreciation for the "lavish" production values of an otherwise thinly plotted motion picture that offers few "cinematic turns".

== Preservation ==
Five reels of the film are believed to be lost. The 103-minute version that is generally available is the re-release from 1932, which had been edited significantly and had reduced the length of the original film from 15 reels to only 10 reels. This is the print that is currently being broadcast on cable by Turner Classic Movies, which is missing about 40 minutes of footage. New York's Museum of Modern Art once had a print of the full-length Rio Rita, but that print was lost or possibly stolen from the museum's archives. The entire soundtrack for the original roadshow version of the film survives on Vitaphone disks. Both picture and sound for at least two musical numbers from the long version are also known to survive: "When You're In Love, You'll Waltz" and "The Kinkajou".

== See also ==
- List of early color feature films
- List of early sound feature films (1926–1929)
