= William LeBaron =

American film producer

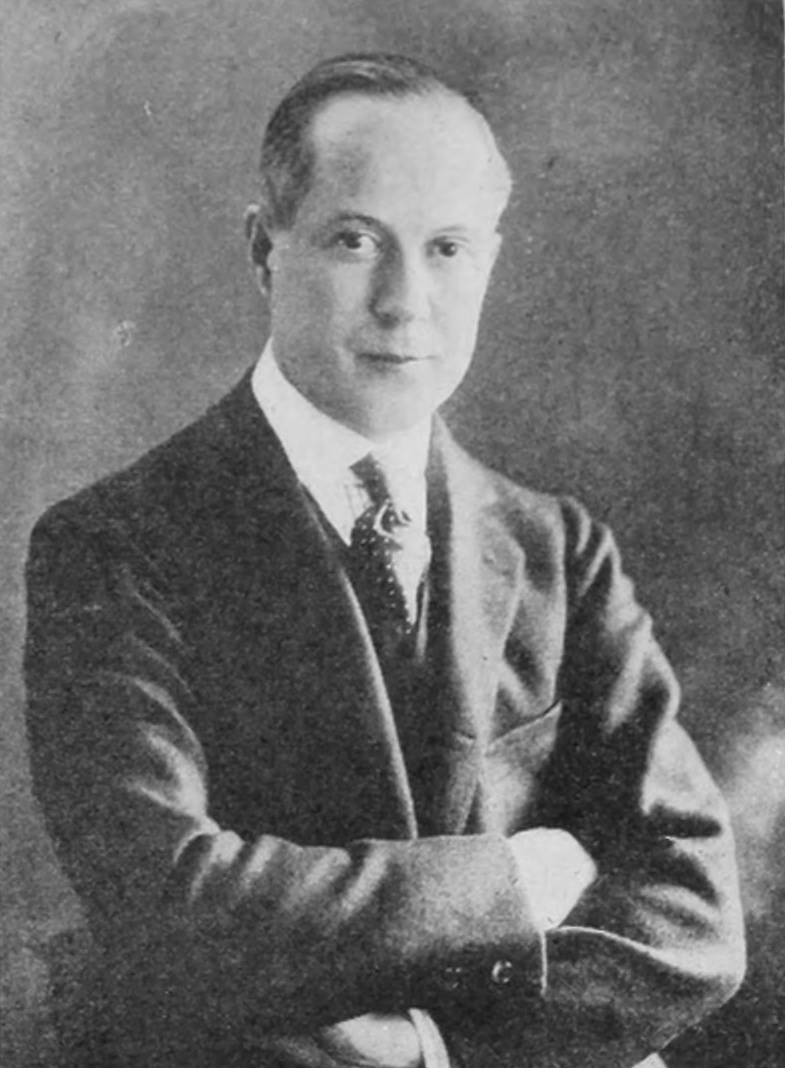
- LeBaron c. 1919
- Born: February 16, 1883; Elgin, Illinois
- Died: February 9, 1958 (aged 74); Santa Monica, California
- Occupations: Film producer, playwright, screen writer, lyricist
- Years active: 1920–1947
- Spouse: Mabel Hollins

William LeBaron (February 16, 1883 – February 9, 1958) was an American film producer, lyricist, librettist, playwright, and screenwriter.

LeBaron authored several plays for Broadway; including the books and lyrics for several musicals in addition to non-musical works staged in New York City between 1911 and 1925. Some of these plays were adapted into films; including his 1917 play The Very Idea, which was made into a silent film in 1920 and a talking picture in 1929; and his 1921 play Nobody's Money, which was adapted into a film in 1923. He also authored the libretti to operettas composed by Victor Herbert, Emmerich Kálmán, Fritz Kreisler and Victor Jacobi.

By 1926 LeBaron had relocated from New York City to Los Angeles, and was thereafter predominantly active as a film producer. His film credits included Cimarron, which won the Academy Award for Outstanding Production at the 4th Academy Awards ceremony for 1930/1931. LeBaron also produced landmark comedy features from W. C. Fields, Mae West and Wheeler and Woolsey. In addition to being a producer, LeBaron served as the last production chief of Film Booking Offices of America and at FBO's successor, RKO Pictures, where he was replaced by David O. Selznick.

== Biography ==
LeBaron was born in Elgin, Illinois, on February 16, 1883. After graduating from high school, he attended the University of Chicago and New York University, and then spent a decade writing musical scores and lyrics for Broadway shows. He then wrote for some magazines and publications, before Joseph Kennedy, an investor in several of LeBaron's plays, suggested that LeBaron move to California in 1924. He joined the American Society of Composers, Authors and Publishers (ASCAP) in 1933 and became a production chief at several studios, including RKO Studios (1929–1931), Paramount Studios (1936–1941) and 20th Century Fox (1941 until his retirement in 1947).

LeBaron died on February 9, 1958, at age 74, and was buried in Chapel of the Pines Crematory. He was married to Mabel Hollins (1887–1955), a British musical comedy actress.

== Stage works ==
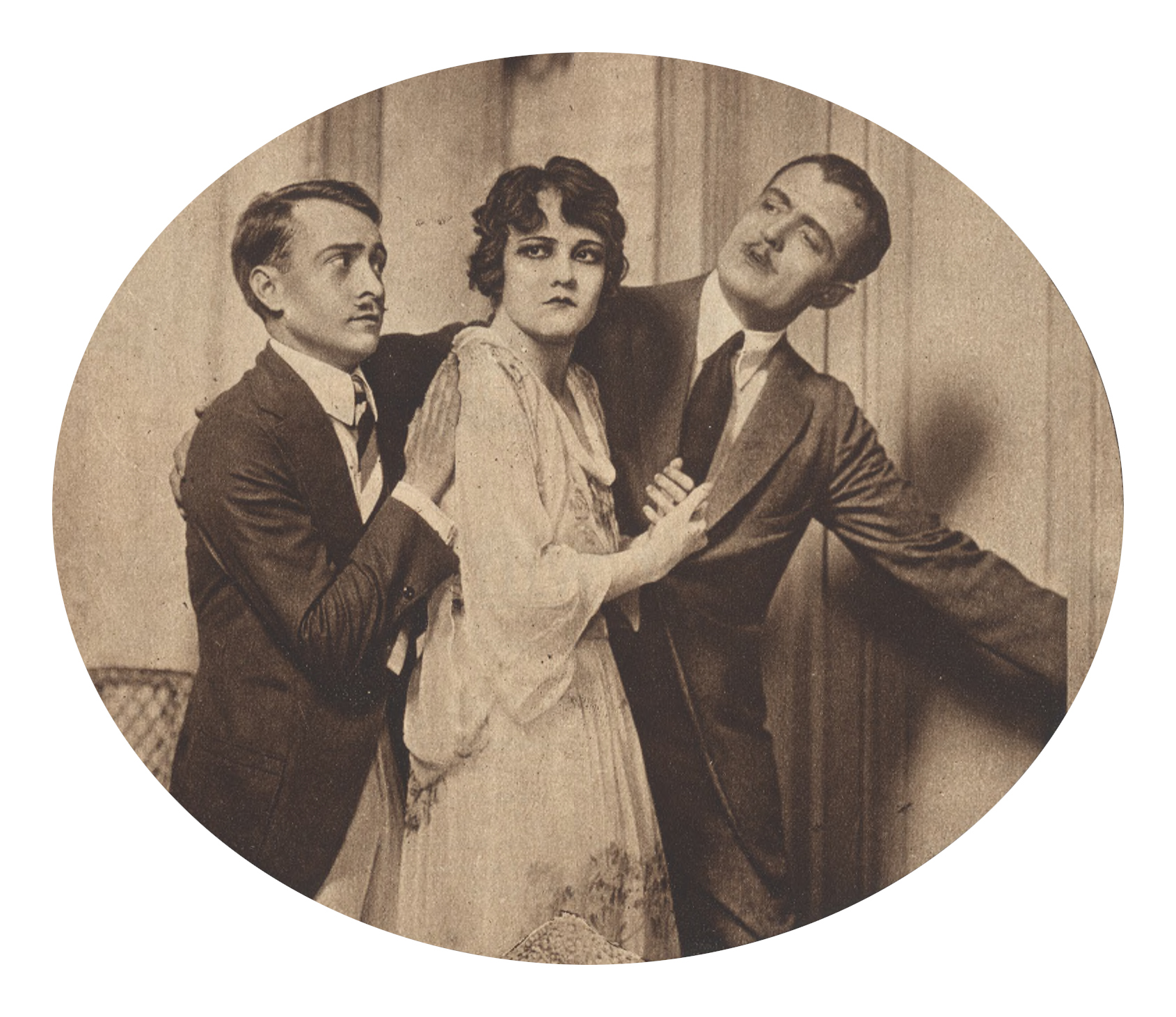
Ernest Truex, Dorothy Mackaye and Richard Bennett in the Broadway production of The Very Idea (1917)

- The Echo, musical (1910, music by Deems Taylor, lyrics and book by Taylor and LeBaron)
- Hello, Paris, musical (1911, music by J. Rosamond Johnson, lyrics by J. Leubrie Hill, book by LeBaron)
- A La Broadway, musical (1911, music by Harold Orlob, book by LeBaron, and lyrics by M. H. Collins and LeBaron)
- The Red Canary, musical (1914, music by Harold Orlob, lyrics by Will B. Johnstone, book by LeBaron and Alexander Johnstone)
- The Very Idea, play (1917, written by Le Baron); adapted into a film
- Her Regiment, operetta (1917, music by Victor Herbert, lyrics and book by Le Baron)
- Back to Earth, play (1918, written by Le Baron)
- I Love You, play (1919, written by Le Baron)
- Apple Blossoms, operetta (1919, music by Fritz Kreisler and Victor Jacobi, libretto by Le Baron)
- The Half Moon, musical (1920, music by Victor Jacobi, lyrics and book by Le Baron)
- Nobody's Money, play (1921, written by Le Baron)
- The Love Letter, musical 1921, music by Victor Jacobi, lyrics and book by Le Baron)
- The Scarlet Man, play (1921, written by Le Baron)
- The Yankee Princess, operetta (1922, music by Emmerich Kálmán, new English language libretto by LeBaron)
- Moonlight, musical (1924, music by Con Conrad, lyrics by William B. Friedlander, book by Le Baron)
- Something To Brag About, play (1925, written by Le Baron)

== Selected filmography ==
- Beau Geste (1926)
- It's the Old Army Game (1926)
- Love 'Em and Leave 'Em (1926)
- The Show-Off (1926)
- Running Wild (1927)
- Love's Greatest Mistake (1927)
- Blind Alleys (1927)
- Lightning Speed (1928)
- Street Girl (1929)
- Side Street (1929)
- Rio Rita (1929)
- Beau Bandit (1930)
- Hit the Deck (1930)
- Hook, Line and Sinker (1930)
- Midnight Mystery (1930)
- The Case of Sergeant Grischa (1930)
- The Fall Guy (1930)
- Conspiracy (1930)
- She's My Weakness (1930)
- Traveling Husbands (1931)
- Cimarron (1931)
- The Sin Ship (1931)
- The Lady Refuses (1931)
- Laugh and Get Rich (1931)
- Kept Husbands (1931)
- Cracked Nuts (1931)
- The Public Defender (1931)
- She Done Him Wrong (1933)
- Baby Face (1933)
- I'm No Angel (1933)
- Belle of the Nineties (1934)
- It's a Gift (1934)
- Man on the Flying Trapeze (1935)
- Klondike Annie (1936)
- Forgotten Faces (1936)
- The Princess Comes Across (1936)
- Till We Meet Again (1936)
- Born to the West (1937)
- Night of Mystery (1937)
- The Buccaneer (1938)
- Television Spy (1939)
- Emergency Squad (1940)
- Golden Gloves (1940)
- Dr. Cyclops (1940)
- Week-End in Havana (1941)
- Orchestra Wives (1942)
- Footlight Serenade (1942)
- Iceland (1942)
- Springtime in the Rockies (1942)
- The Gang's All Here (1943)
- Stormy Weather (1943)
- Pin Up Girl (1944)
- Carnegie Hall (1947)
