= News Parade =

1928 film by David Butler

- Directed by: David Butler
- Written by: Malcolm Stuart Boylan; David Butler; William M. Conselman; Burnet Hershey
- Starring: Nick Stuart; Sally Phipps; Brandon Hurst
- Cinematography: Joseph A. Valentine; Sidney Wagner
- Edited by: Irene Morra
- Production company: Fox Film
- Distributed by: Fox Film
- Release date: May 27, 1928
- Running time: 70 minutes
- Country: United States
- Languages: Silent; English intertitles

News Parade is a 1928 American comedy film directed by David Butler and starring Nick Stuart, Sally Phipps and Brandon Hurst. The film portrays the adventures of a newsreel cameraman. Despite poor reviews and only a modest box office performance it was followed by several similar films including Chasing Through Europe (1929).

== Plot ==
Nick Naylor receives an order to take a picture of the camera-shy millionaire A.K. Wellington. As the millionaire is traveling with his daughter, Nick follows them to Lake Placid, Palm Beach and even Havana. In Havana, he is then able to shoot the photos of the millionaire. There, they are both kidnapped.

== Cast ==
- Nick Stuart as 'Newsreel Nick' Naylor
- Sally Phipps as Sally Wellington
- Brandon Hurst as A.K. Wellington
- Cyril Ring as Prince Oscar
- Earle Foxe as Ivan Vodkoff - Mysterious Stranger
- Franklin Underwood as Bill Walpole
- Truman H. Talley as Direct-in-Chief Talley

== Production ==
Parts of the film were shot on location in Lake Placid. One critic noted that "Brandon Hurst as the millionaire father is especially amusing as a skater at Lake Placid."

== Bibliography ==
- Solomon, Aubrey. The Fox Film Corporation, 1915-1935. A History and Filmography. McFarland & Co, 2011.
