= Cradle Snatchers =

1927 film by Howard Hawks

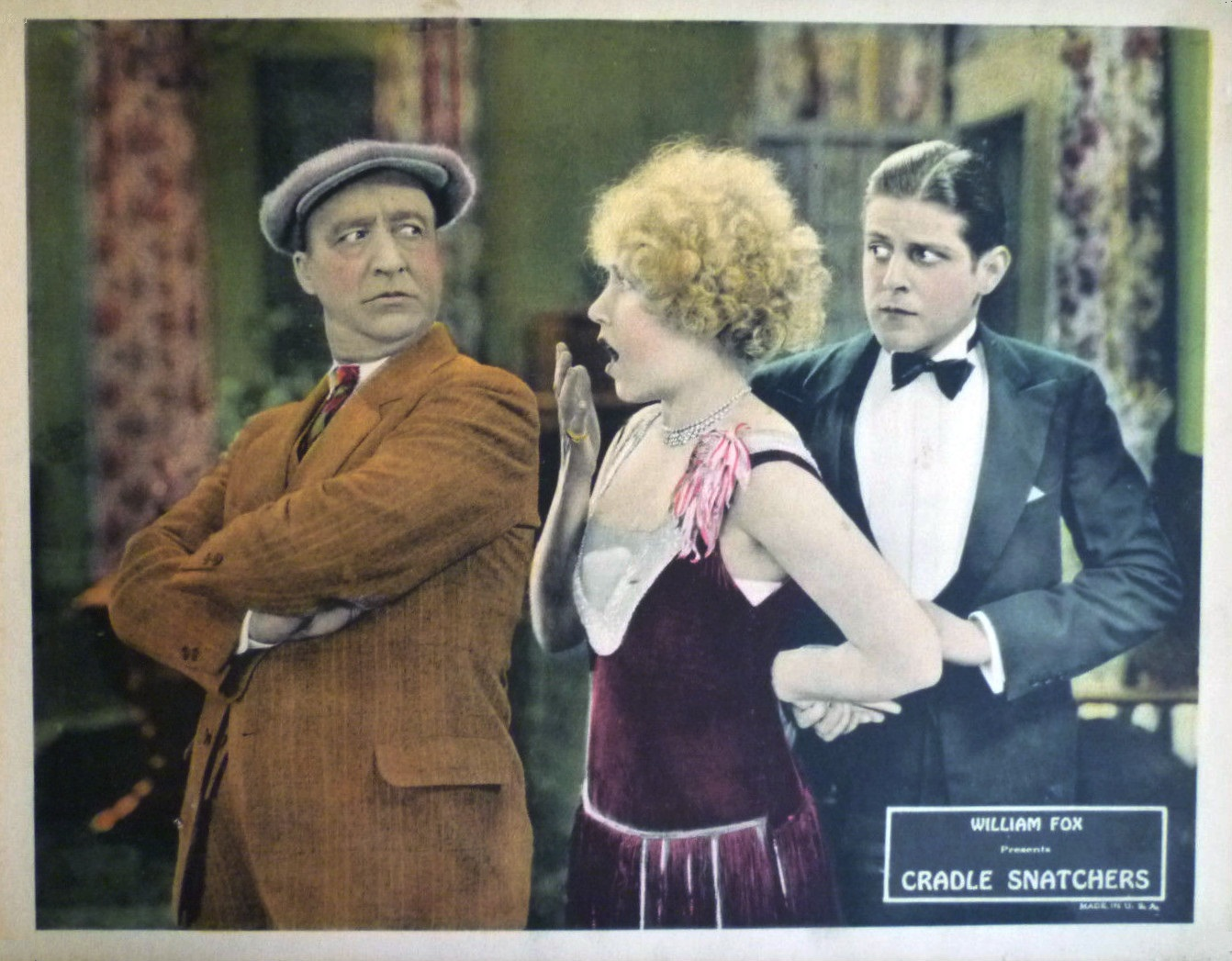
- Lobby card
- Directed by: Howard Hawks
- Written by: Sarah Y. Mason (scenario); Malcolm Stuart Boylan (intertitles)
- Based on: Cradle Snatchers by Russell Medcraft and Norma Mitchell
- Produced by: William Fox
- Starring: Louise Fazenda; Dorothy Phillips; Ethel Wales
- Cinematography: L. William O'Connell
- Distributed by: Fox Film
- Release date: May 28, 1927
- Running time: 7 reels; 6,281 feet
- Country: United States
- Language: Silent (English intertitles)

Cradle Snatchers is a 1927 American silent comedy film directed by Howard Hawks. The picture is based on the 1925 Russell Medcraft and Norma Mitchell stage play of the same name that starred Mary Boland, Edna May Oliver, Raymond Hackett, Gene Raymond, and Humphrey Bogart.

The film was remade as Why Leave Home? (1929).

== Plot ==
Surviving portions of the film

Three unhappy, middle-aged housewives teach their adulterous husbands a lesson by starting affairs with college-aged men during the Jazz Age.

== Cast ==
- Louise Fazenda as Susan Martin
- Ethel Wales as Ethel Drake
- Dorothy Phillips as Kitty Ladd
- J. Farrell MacDonald as George Martin
- Franklin Pangborn as Howard Drake
- William B. Davidson as Roy Ladd
- Joseph Striker as Joe Valley
- Nick Stuart as Henry Winton
- Arthur Lake as Oscar
- Diane Ellis as Ann Hall (credited as Dione Ellis)
- Sammy Cohen as Ike Ginsberg
- Tyler Brooke as Osteopath

== Preservation ==
An incomplete print of Cradle Snatchers, missing part of reel 3 and all of reel 4, is in the collection of the Library of Congress.
