= She's My Weakness =

1930 film by Melville W. Brown

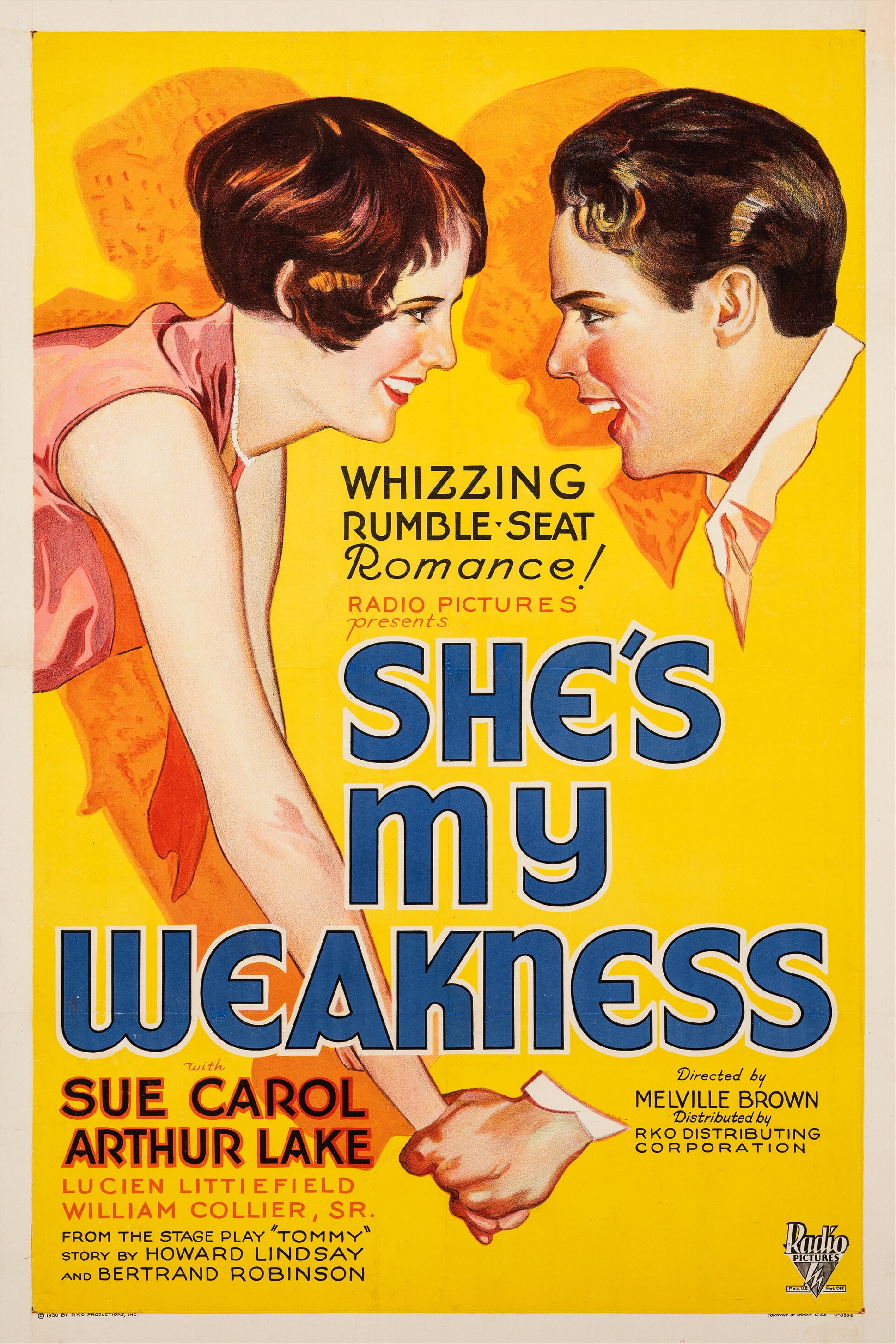
- Theatrical release poster
- Directed by: Melville W. Brown
- Screenplay by: J. Walter Ruben
- Based on: Tommy by Howard Lindsay; Bertrand Robinson
- Produced by: William Le Baron; Henry Hobart
- Cinematography: Leo Tover
- Edited by: Arthur Roberts; Jack Kitchin
- Production company: RKO Radio Pictures
- Distributed by: RKO Radio Pictures
- Release dates: June 20, 1930 (New York City); August 1, 1930 (United States)
- Running time: 70 minutes
- Country: United States
- Language: English

She's My Weakness is a 1930 American Pre-Code romantic comedy film directed by Melville W. Brown (assisted by Dewey Starkey) and starring Sue Carol and Arthur Lake. The screenplay was written by J. Walter Ruben, based on the Broadway play Tommy by Howard Lindsay and Bertrand Robinson.

== Plot ==
Tommy Mills wants to marry his girlfriend, Marie Thurber, but cannot afford it. When he inherits a piece of property, he plans on selling it in order to facilitate the marriage. However, Marie is also being pursued by Bernard Norton, who is not as seemingly dull as Tommy. Marie's parents would prefer their daughter to marry Tommy, but things get complicated when Marie's father, Warren, needs to sell a piece of property he owns in order to get himself out of financial difficulty. The town is interested in both pieces, but will only purchase one of them.

To further complicate matters, Tommy's uncle, David Tuttle is attempting to broker the deal for the purchase of the land. In the confusion which ensues, both land parcels are sold without the permission of their owners. The resulting chaos gives the appearance of misdeeds by Tommy, which pushes Marie towards the arms of her other suitor. However, the truth comes out in the end, both Tommy and Mr. Thurber sell their properties and alleviate their financial needs, and Tommy and Marie get married.

== Cast ==
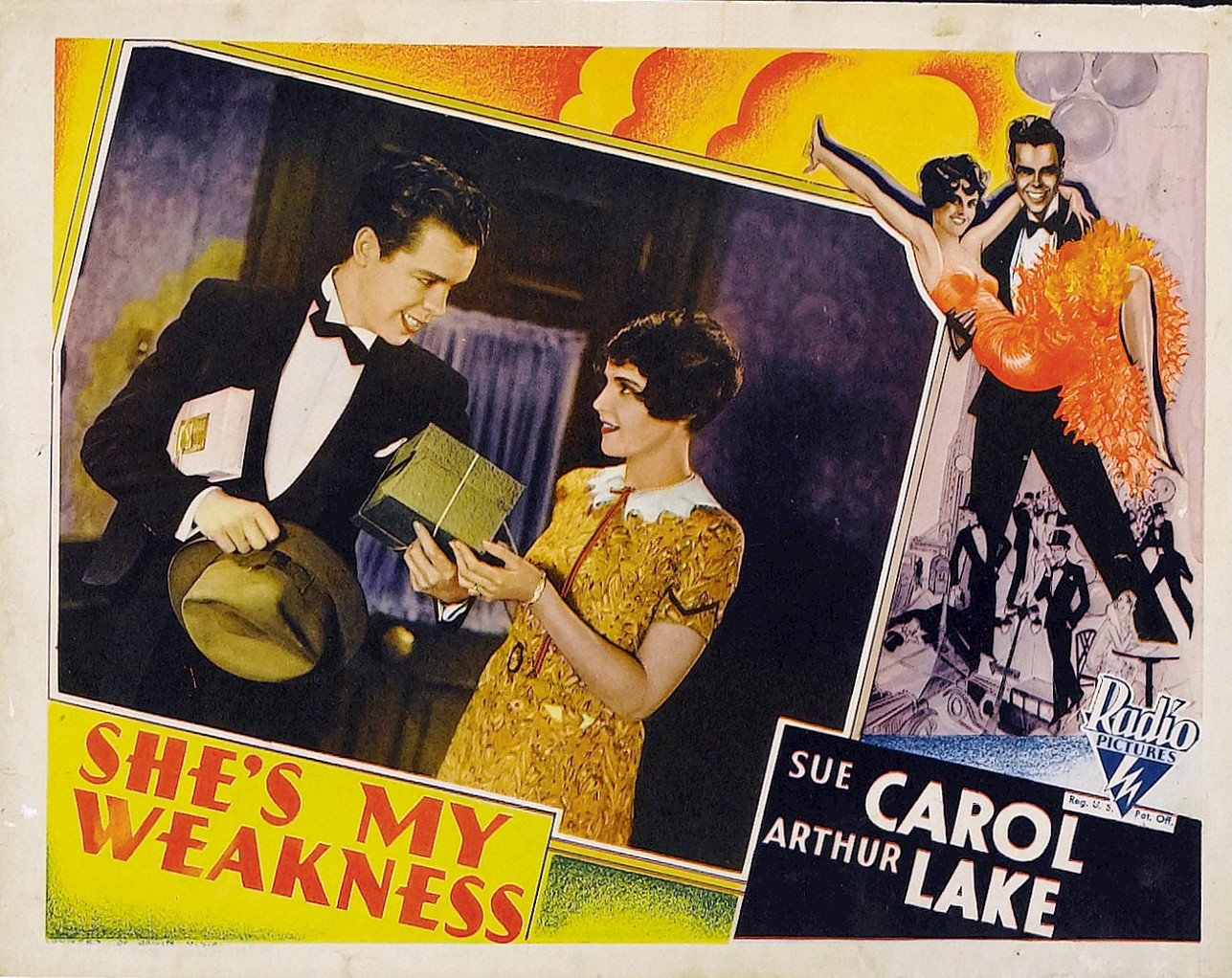
Lobby card

- Arthur Lake as Tommy Mills
- Sue Carol as Marie Thurber
- Lucien Littlefield as Warren Thurber
- William Collier Sr. as David Tuttle
- Helen Ware as Mrs. Thurber
- Alan Bunce as Bernard Norton
- Emily Fitzroy as Mrs. Oberlander

(cast list as per AFI database)

== Reception ==
The New York Times, in its review of the film, gave it mostly lukewarm and negative reviews. The critic commented negatively on the performances of the two leads, going so far to characterize Lake's performance by stating his "... adolescent appearance makes him ideal for the part but whose apparent ignorance of what is good acting is appalling." while calling the acting of some of the supporting cast adequate, and was also less than thrilled with the direction of the piece

== Notes ==
The Broadway play on which this film was based, Tommy, was directed by the playwrights, and ran from January through August 1927 at the Gaiety Theatre. It was revived for a short run in August 1933 at the Forrest Theatre, which is now known as the Eugene O'Neill Theatre. The tagline for the film was "Youth whoops it up in the rumble seat!"
