= The Shakedown (1929 film) =

1929 film

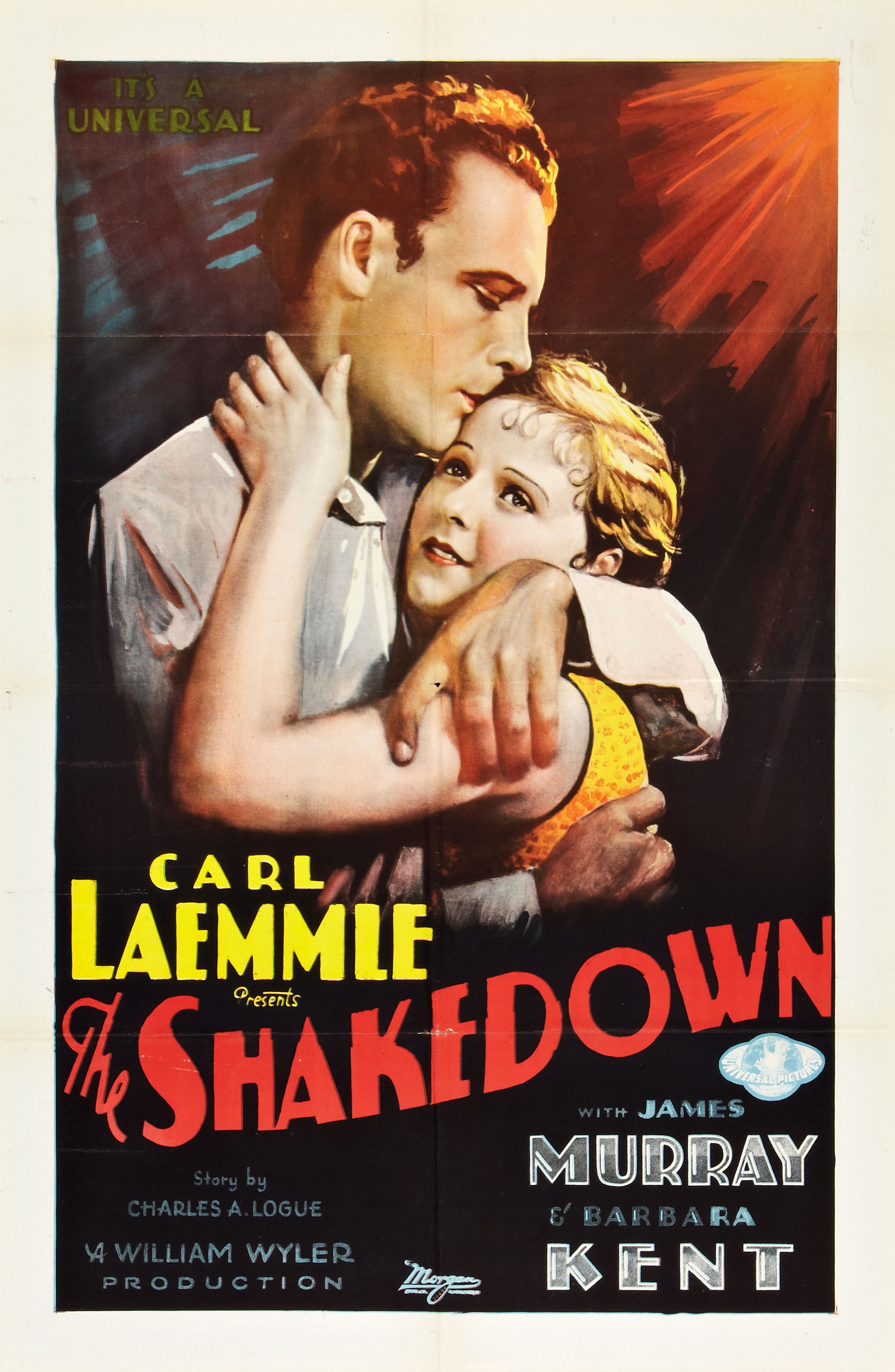
- Theatrical release poster
- Directed by: William Wyler
- Written by: Charles Logue; Clarence Marks
- Produced by: Carl Laemmle Jr.
- Starring: James Murray; Barbara Kent
- Cinematography: Jerome Ash; Charles J. Stumar
- Edited by: Richard Cahoon; Lloyd Nosler
- Music by: Joseph Cherniavsky
- Distributed by: Universal Pictures
- Release date: March 10, 1929
- Running time: 70 minutes
- Country: United States
- Languages: Sound (Part-Talkie); English intertitles
- Budget: $50,000

The Shakedown (1929) by William Wyler

The Shakedown is a 1929 American part-talkie pre-Code action comedy-drama sports film directed by William Wyler and starring James Murray, Barbara Kent and Jack Hanlon.

This film was released in two versions: a part-talking version for English speaking audiences and a Synchronized version for non-English speaking audiences. The International Sound Version survives in an Italian archive with the original synchronized soundtrack. This print of The Shakedown was converted into a silent version by the staff of the George Eastman House in 1998 and released on Blu-ray without the original soundtrack. The original part-talkie version appears to be lost.

== Plot ==
Dave Roberts is a professional boxer who loses intentionally in fixed matches. Dave's life on the margins changes after he meets an honest woman and rescues an orphan from an oncoming train. As he cares for the woman and child, he must decide whether to continue his derelict ways or rebel against those who have been manipulating him.

== Cast ==
- James Murray as Dave Roberts
- Barbara Kent as Marjorie
- George Kotsonaros as Battling Roff
- Wheeler Oakman as Manager
- Jack Hanlon as Clem
- Harry Gribbon as Dugan
- Annabelle Magnus as Little Girl (uncredited)
- George Marion as Screaming Fight Spectator with White Beard (uncredited)
- Jack McHugh as Boy that fights Clem (uncredited)
- Jack Raymond as Salesman (uncredited)
- Harry Tenbrook as Manager's Henchman (uncredited)
- William Wyler as Photographer at Fight Arena (uncredited)
- John Huston as extra (uncredited)

== Music ==
The film featured a theme song entitled "Dear Little Boy Of Mine" which was composed by Ernest R. Ball and J. Keirn Brennan.

== See also ==
- List of boxing films
- List of early sound feature films (1926–1929)
