= Why Leave Home? =

1929 film

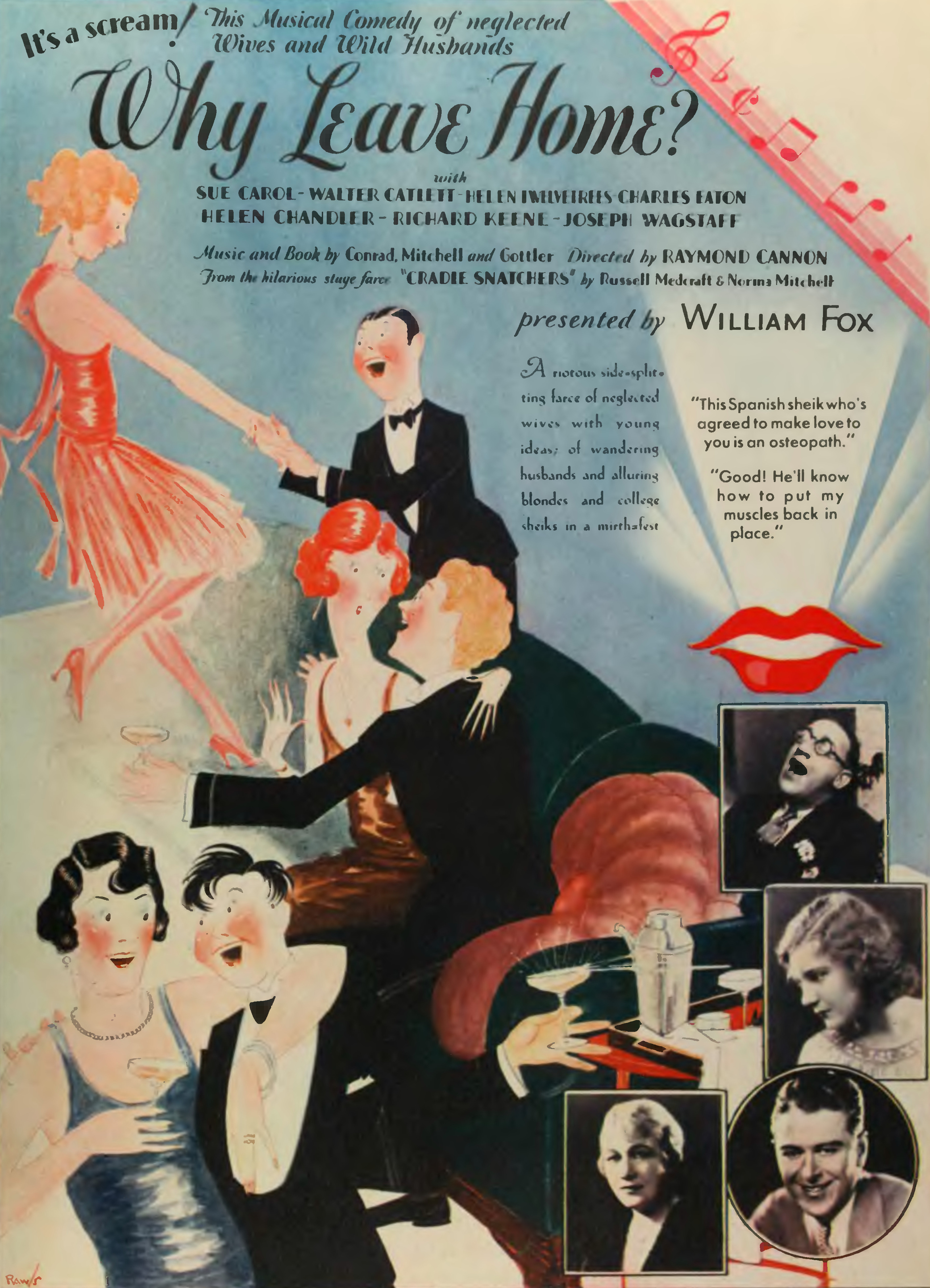
- Directed by: Raymond Cannon
- Screenplay by: Robert S. Carr; Walter Catlett
- Based on: Cradle Snatchers by Russell Medcraft and Norma Mitchell
- Produced by: Malcolm Stuart Boylan
- Starring: Sue Carol; Nick Stuart; Dixie Lee; Ilka Chase; Walter Catlett; Gordon De Main
- Cinematography: Daniel B. Clark
- Edited by: Jack Murray
- Music by: Con Conrad; Archie Gottler; Sidney D. Mitchell
- Production company: Fox Film Corporation
- Distributed by: Fox Film Corporation
- Release date: August 25, 1929
- Running time: 70 minutes
- Country: United States
- Language: English

Why Leave Home? is a 1929 American sound (All-Talking) pre-Code comedy film directed by Raymond Cannon and written by Robert Spencer Carr and Walter Catlett. The film stars Sue Carol, Nick Stuart, Dixie Lee, Ilka Chase, Walter Catlett, and Gordon De Main. The film was released on August 25, 1929, by Fox Film Corporation. It is a remake of Cradle Snatchers (1927). Why Leave Home? was later remade in 1943 as Let's Face It with Bob Hope.

== Cast ==
- Sue Carol as Mary
- Nick Stuart as Dick
- Dixie Lee as Billie
- Ilka Chase as Ethel
- Walter Catlett as Elmer
- Gordon De Main as Roy
- Dot Farley as Susan
- Laura Hamilton as Maude
- Richard Keene as Jose
- Jean Laverty as Jackie
- Jed Prouty as George

== Preservation status ==
- Why Leave Home? is said to be a lost film according to the Fox section at Lost Film Files.

== See also ==
- List of early sound feature films (1926–1929)
