= Straightaway (film) =

1933 film by Otto Brower

- Directed by: Otto Brower
- Starring: Tim McCoy; Sue Carol; William Bakewell
- Distributed by: Columbia Pictures
- Release date: December 22, 1933
- Running time: 58 minutes
- Country: United States
- Language: English

Straightaway is a 1933 American Pre-Code crime drama film directed by Otto Brower and starring Tim McCoy, Sue Carol, and William Bakewell.

== Cast ==
- Tim McCoy as Tim Dawson
- Sue Carol as Anna Reeves
- William Bakewell as Billy Dawson
- Ward Bond as Hobo
- Francis McDonald as Rogan
