= Graft (1931 film) =

1931 film by Christy Cabanne

- Video cover
- Directed by: Christy Cabanne
- Written by: Barry Barringer
- Produced by: Samuel Bischoff
- Starring: Regis Toomey; Sue Carol
- Cinematography: Jerome Ash
- Edited by: Byron Robinson; Maurice Pivar
- Distributed by: Universal Pictures
- Release date: September 21, 1931
- Running time: 54 minutes
- Country: United States
- Language: English

Graft is a 1931 American pre-Code thriller film, directed by Christy Cabanne, starring Regis Toomey and future talent agent Sue Carol, and featuring Boris Karloff, who appeared in Frankenstein during the same year.

== Cast ==
- Regis Toomey as Dusty Hotchkiss
- Sue Carol as Constance Hall
- Dorothy Revier as Pearl Vaughan
- Boris Karloff as Joe Terry
- George Irving as Robert Hall
- Richard Tucker as Carter Harrison
- William B. Davidson as M.H. Thomas
- Willard Robertson as Scudder
- Harold Goodwin as Speed Hansen
- Carmelita Geraghty as Secretary
