= Hide-Out (1930 film) =

1930 film

- Directed by: Reginald Barker
- Screenplay by: Lambert Hillyer; Arthur Ripley; Matt Taylor
- Story by: Lambert Hillyer; Arthur Ripley
- Produced by: Carl Laemmle
- Starring: James Murray; Kathryn Crawford; Carl Stockdale; Lee Moran; Guy Edward Hearn; Robert Elliott
- Cinematography: Gilbert Warrenton
- Edited by: Harry Marker
- Music by: Heinz Roemheld
- Production company: Universal Pictures
- Distributed by: Universal Pictures
- Release date: April 1930
- Running time: 59 minutes
- Country: United States
- Language: English

Hide-Out is a 1930 American pre-Code drama film directed by Reginald Barker and written by Lambert Hillyer, Arthur Ripley, and Matt Taylor. The film stars James Murray, Kathryn Crawford, Carl Stockdale, Lee Moran, Guy Edward Hearn, and Robert Elliott. The film was released by Universal Pictures in April 1930.

== Plot ==
A bootlegger in trouble with the law hides out on a college campus. He disguises himself as a student, but soon becomes the school's star crew athlete and most popular man on campus. The film contains some action scenes, "including an eight-oared shell race". Other settings include a banquet, a train, and a speakeasy.

== Cast ==
- James Murray as Jimmy Dorgan
- Kathryn Crawford as Dorothy Evans
- Carl Stockdale as Dorgan
- Lee Moran as Joe Hennessey
- Guy Edward Hearn as Coach Latham
- Robert Elliott as William Burke
- Jack Hanlon as Jerry
- George Hackathorne as Atlas
- Sarah Padden as Mrs. Dorgan
- Jane Keckley as Mrs. Evans
- Richard Carlyle as Dean
