= Girls Gone Wild (film) =

1929 film by Lewis Seiler

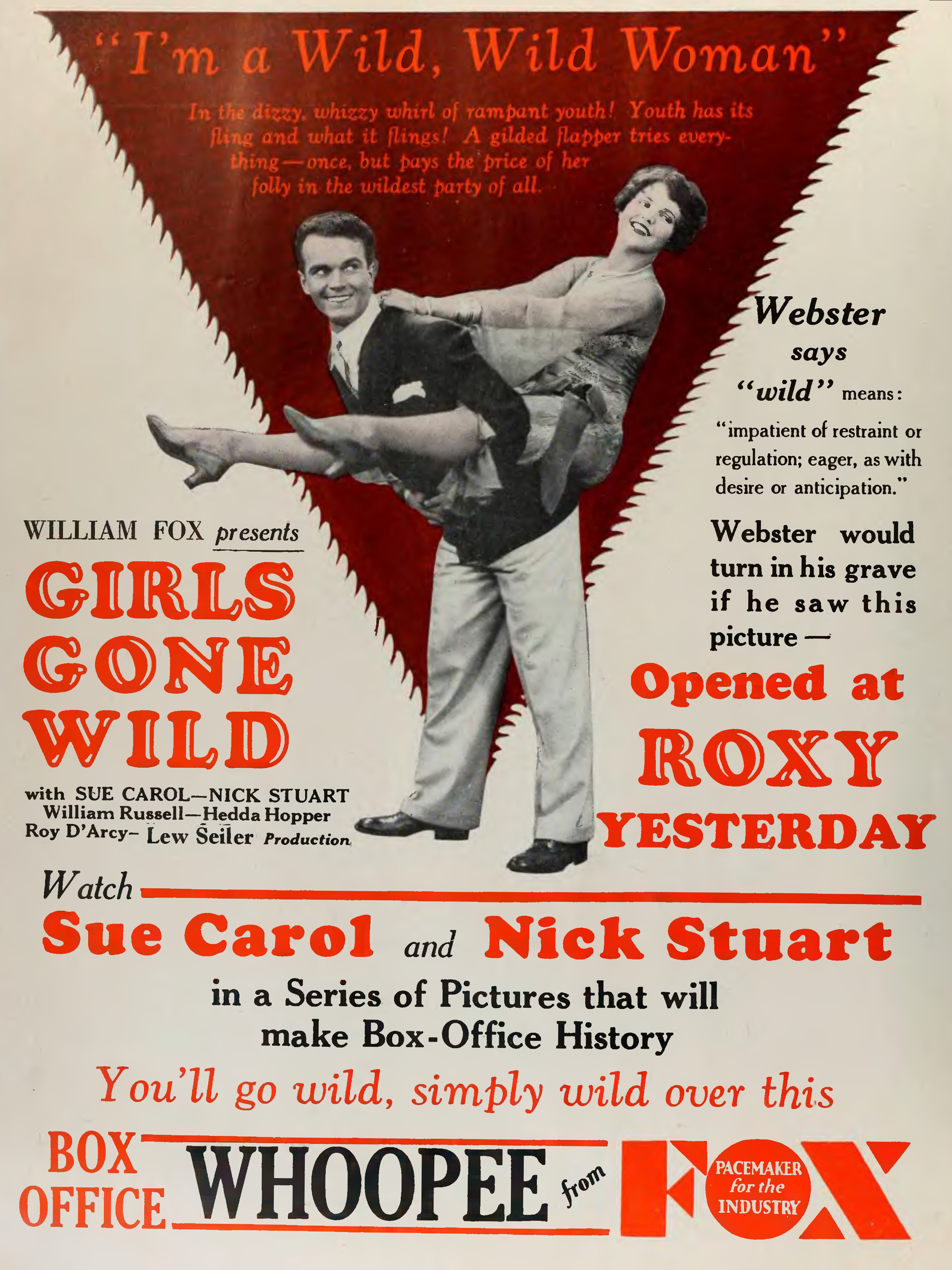
- Advertisement
- Directed by: Lewis Seiler
- Written by: Beulah Marie Dix; Malcolm Stuart Boylan (intertitles)
- Story by: Bertram Millhauser
- Produced by: William Fox
- Starring: Nick Stuart; Sue Carol
- Cinematography: Arthur Edeson; Irving Rosenberg
- Distributed by: Fox Film Corporation
- Release date: March 24, 1929
- Running time: 60 minutes
- Country: United States
- Language: Sound (Synchronized) (English Intertitles)

Girls Gone Wild is a 1929 pre-Code American Synchronized sound melodrama film produced and released by Fox Film Corporation. While the film has no audible dialog, it was released with a synchronized musical score with sound effects using the sound-on-film Movietone process. The film was controversial as an early example of the rising tide of violence and disrespect for the law that would become key themes in the 1930s.

== Cast ==
- Sue Carol as Babs Holworthy
- Nick Stuart as Buck Brown
- William Russell as Dan Brown
- Roy D'Arcy as Tony Morelli
- Leslie Fenton as Boogs
- Hedda Hopper as Mrs. Holworthy
- John Darrow as Speed Wade
- Matthew Betz as Augie Stern
- Edmund Breese as Judge Elliott
- Minna Redman as Grandma (credited as Minna Ferry)
- Louis Natheaux as Dilly
- Lumsden Hare as Tom Holworthy
- Fred MacMurray as Extra (uncredited)

== Release ==
Directed by Lewis Seiler, the film was released in sound and silent versions. The film starred Nick Stuart and Sue Carol, an up-and-coming young film duo being molded by Fox in the Janet Gaynor / Charles Farrell tradition. The two would be married later in the year, in a November 1929 surprise ceremony.

== Censorship ==
Like many American films of the time, Girls Gone Wild was subject to cuts by city and state film censorship boards. In Kansas the film, with a violent plot and an adolescent target audience, was banned by the Board of Review.

== Preservation ==
With no prints of Girls Gone Wild located in any film archives, it is a lost film.

== See also ==
- List of early sound feature films (1926–1929)
