= Ilka Chase =

American actress & novelist (1905–1978)

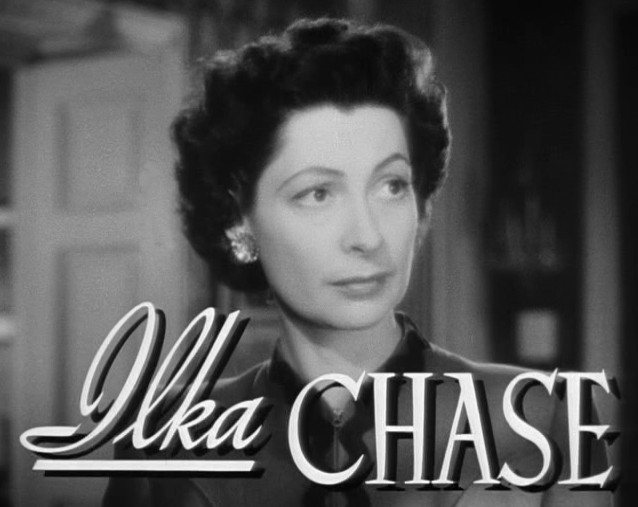
- Chase in Now, Voyager (1942)
- Born: April 8, 1905; New York City, New York, U.S.
- Died: February 15, 1978 (aged 72); Mexico City, Mexico
- Resting place: Locust Valley Cemetery, Locust Valley, New York, U.S.
- Occupations: Actress; radio host; novelist
- Years active: 1923–1972
- Spouses: Louis Calhern (m. 1926; div. 1927) William Murray (m. 1935; div. 1946) Norton Sager Brown (m. 1946)
- Parent: Edna Woolman Chase

Ilka Chase (April 8, 1905 – February 15, 1978) was an American actress, radio host, and novelist.

== Early life ==
Chase was born in New York City and educated at convent and boarding schools in the United States, England, and France. She was the only child of Francis Dane Chase, a merchant mariner who became a dry goods salesman and then the general manager of New York's Hotel Colonial, and Edna Woolman Chase (née Allaway). Her mother, who became the editor-in-chief of Vogue, described Chase's father, whom she married in 1902, as "a lovable, good-looking, irresponsible young man from Boston. His father had been a banker, and depending on when you met them, the family had money." After her parents' divorce, her father married artist Theodora Larsh. Her mother married engineer Richard Newton.

Chase made her stage debut at the age of eight in a convent-school production of Puss in Boots. After graduating from France's Château de Groslay boarding school, Chase made her society debut in December 1923 at a celebrity-studded banquet hosted by Edna at the Cosmopolitan Club in New York City. The 250 guests included Edna's employer, Condé Nast, Vanity Fair editor-in-chief Frank Crowninshield, and future Harper's Bazaar editor-in-chief Carmel Snow.

== Career ==
=== Stage ===
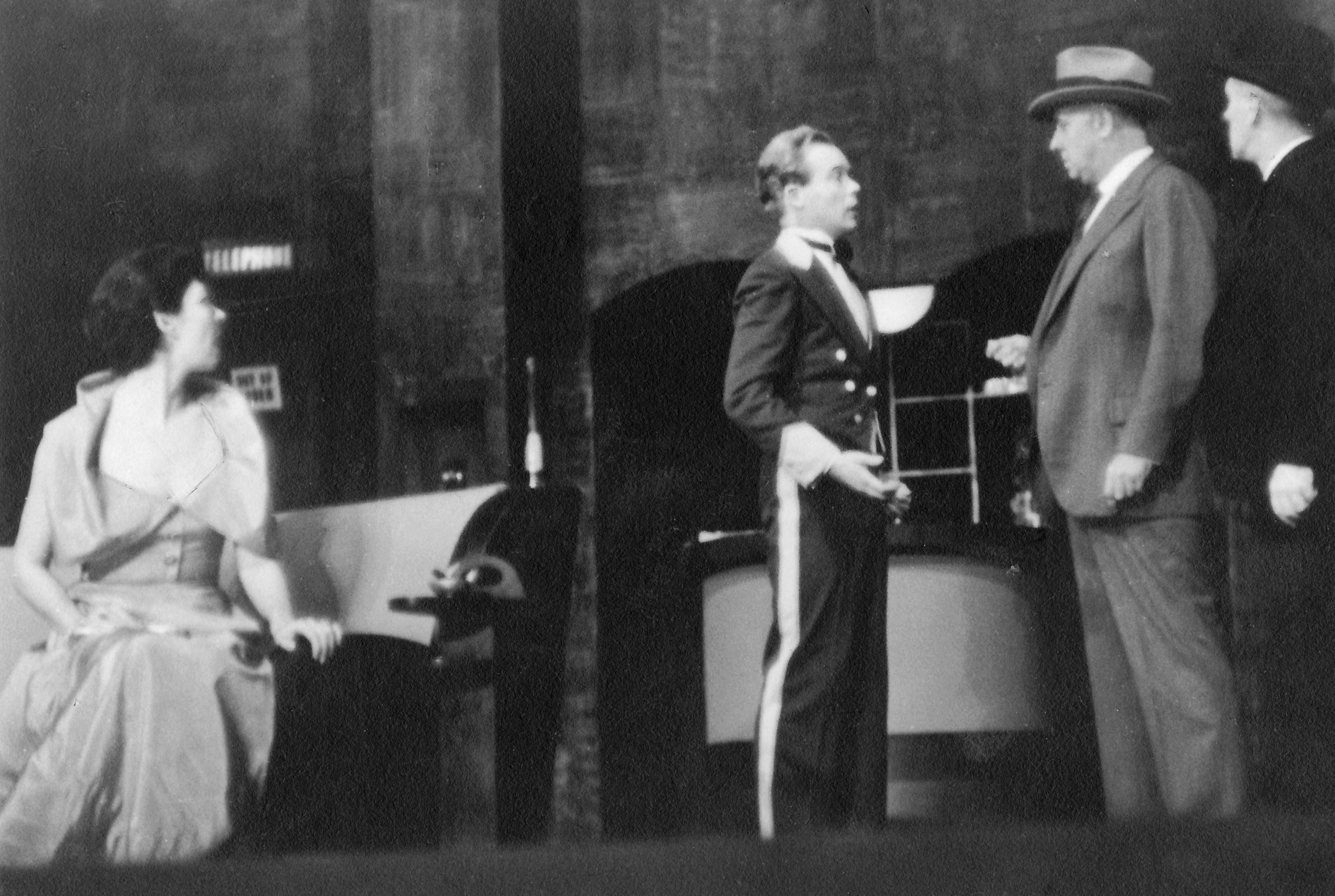
Chase (left) in the Broadway stage production Small Miracle (1934)

Chase's Broadway debut occurred in 1924 in The Red Falcon. Her stage appearances included roles in Days Without End, Forsaking All Others, While Parents Sleep, Small Miracle, On to Fortune, Tampico, Co-Respondent Unknown, Keep Off the Grass, and In Bed We Cry, an adaptation of her novel of the same name. She was in the original Broadway cast of Clare Boothe Luce's play The Women (1938), and many years later appeared in Neil Simon's Broadway hit Barefoot in the Park.

=== Films ===
Her films included Fast and Loose (1930), The Animal Kingdom (1932), Now, Voyager (1942), Once a Sinner (1950), and The Big Knife (1955). Her last motion picture was in Ocean's 11 (1960) as Mrs. Restes.

=== Radio ===
In the early 1940s, Chase was the hostess for Penthouse Party on CBS and Luncheon Date With Ilka Chase, on NBC Red. For several years, she hosted the radio program Luncheon at the Waldorf.

=== Television ===
In early 1950 Chase co-hosted a CBS network cultural interview show titled Glamour-Go-Round with Durward Kirby. In late 1950 she became host of Fashion Magic on Philadelphia's local CBS affiliate, WCAU. This half-hour show was broadcast on Monday and Friday afternoons. She appeared as a panelist on several programs in the early years of television, including Celebrity Time (1949–50), Who Said That? (1950–55), and Masquerade Party (1952–56).

In 1957, Chase performed the role of the Stepmother in the television production of Rodgers and Hammerstein's Cinderella, which starred Julie Andrews. In 1963, she made a rare television sitcom appearance as Aunt Pauline on The Patty Duke Show.

Chase was a regular in The Trials of O'Brien on CBS in the mid-1960s.

=== Writing ===
Her novel In Bed We Cry appeared in 1943 and was adapted for the stage, with Chase in the leading role.

Her autobiography Past Imperfect (volume I), in which she wrote, "Those who never fail are those who never try," was published in 1942, and Free Admission (volume II) was published in 1948. She also wrote more than a dozen other books, including The Care and Feeding of Friends, a guide to lighthearted entertaining with over 80 recipes and 20 menus.

Among her other books are several travel books which recount her adventures while traveling around the world with her husband Dr. Norton Brown.

== Personal life ==
Chase was married three times, first to stage and movie actor Louis Calhern. The couple met while performing in summer stock with the George Cukor Company in Rochester, New York, married in June 1926, and divorced six months later, in February 1927.

She next wed William Buckley Murray, a former music critic of The Brooklyn Daily Eagle and onetime executive of NBC, in Greenwich, Connecticut, on 13 July 1935. Murray also had been a concert manager for the Baldwin Piano Company and became the head of radio and television at the William Morris Agency. In 1932, Chase and Murray had adapted We Are No Longer Children, a play by French playwright Leopold Marchand. From this marriage, she had one stepson, William Buckley Murray Jr. Murray's only child by his previous wife, Natalia Danesi, an opera singer. William Jr., later became a crime novelist and writer for The New Yorker. Ilka and William Sr., were divorced in Las Vegas, Nevada, on 4 December 1946.

Three days later, on 7 December 1946, she married Norton Sager Brown, a physician, in Las Vegas. Chase and Brown had divorced their spouses so they could marry each other. They remained married until her death in 1978. From this marriage, Chase had a stepson, James Brown.

== Death ==
Chase died of internal hemorrhaging on February 15, 1978, in Mexico City, Mexico. She was 72. She was buried beside her mother in Locust Valley Cemetery on Long Island, New York.

== Personal papers ==
Chase's personal papers, as well as those of her mother, are in the Billy Rose Theatre Division of the New York Public Library.

== Filmography ==
Year	Title	Role	Notes
1929	Paris Bound	Fanny Shipman	based on the 1927 play Paris Bound, in which Chase was a member of the cast
1929	Why Leave Home?	Ethel	Lost film
1929	The Careless Age	Bunty	
1929	Red Hot Rhythm	Mrs. Fioretta	Lost film
1929	Rich People	Margery Mears	
1929	South Sea Rose	Maid	Lost film
1930	Let's Go Places	Mrs. Du Bonnet	Lost film
1930	The Big Party		Lost film
1930	The Golden Calf	Comedienne	
1930	Born Reckless	High Society Customer at Beretti's	
1930	The Florodora Girl	Fanny	
1930	On Your Back	Dixie Mason	
1930	Fast and Loose	Millie Montgomery	
1930	Free Love	Pauline	
1931	Once a Sinner	Kitty King	
1931	The Gay Diplomat	Madame Blinis	
1932	The Animal Kingdom	Grace	
1936	Soak the Rich	Mrs. Mabel Craig	
1936	The Lady Consents	Susan	
1939	Stronger Than Desire	Jo Brennan	
1942	Now, Voyager	Lisa Vale	
1943	No Time for Love	Hoppy Grant	
1948	Miss Tatlock's Millions	Cassie Van Alen	
1954	It Should Happen to You	Guest Panel #2	
1954	Johnny Dark	Abbie Binns	
1955	The Big Knife	Patty Benedict	
1960	Ocean's 11	Mrs. Restes	

== Published works ==
=== Novels ===
- Chase, Ilka (1943). In Bed We Cry.
- Chase, Ilka (1946). I love Miss Tilli Bean.
- Chase, Ilka (1951). New York 22.
- Chase, Ilka (1956). The Island Players.
- Chase, Ilka (1960). Three Men on the Left Hand.
- Chase, Ilka (1976). Dear Intruder: A novel about an indiscretion.

=== Non-fiction ===
- Chase, Ilka. The Care and Feeding of Friends.

=== Memoirs ===
- Chase, Ilka (1942). Past Imperfect.
- — (1948). Free Admission.

=== Travel Books ===
- Chase, Ilka (1961). The Carthaginian Rose.
- Chase, Ilka (1963). Elephants arrive at half-past five.
- Chase, Ilka (1966). Second Spring and Two Potatoes.
- Chase, Ilka (1967). Fresh From The Laundry.
- Chase, Ilka (1969). The Varied Airs of Spring, Chase.
- Chase, Ilka (1970). Around the World and Other Places, Chase.

=== Essays and reporting ===
- Chase, Ilka (1953). "It was good enough for Father". In Birmingham, Frederic A. (ed.). The Girls from Esquire. London: Arthur Barker. pp. 129–135.

=== Critical studies and reviews of Chase's work ===
In Bed We Cry

- Wylie, Philip (November 7, 1943). "Gleanings from the Crop of Fall Novels : Cafe Society Amours". The New York Times.
