= Francis McDonald =

American actor (1891–1968)

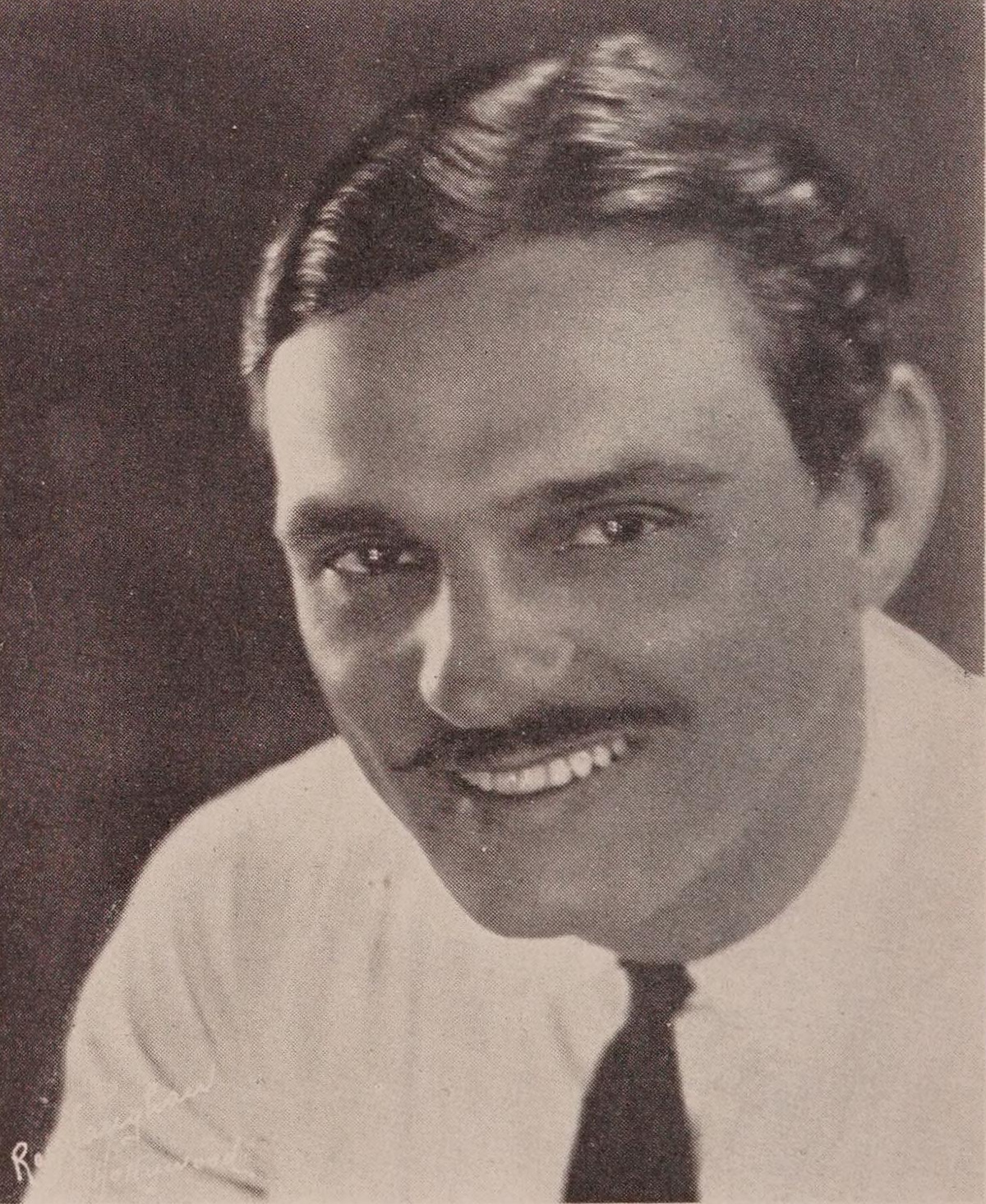
- Born: August 22, 1891; Bowling Green, Kentucky, U.S.
- Died: September 18, 1968 (aged 77); Hollywood, California, U.S.
- Resting place: Valhalla Memorial Park Cemetery in North Hollywood, California
- Occupation: Actor
- Years active: 1913–1965
- Spouses: Mae Busch (m. 1915; div. 1922): Bella Roscoe (m. ?–?); Irene Mary Schuck (m. ?–?)

Francis McDonald (August 22, 1891 – September 18, 1968) was an American actor whose career spanned 52 years.

== Early years ==
Born on August 22, 1891, in Bowling Green, Kentucky, McDonald was the son of John Francis McDonald and Catherine Ashlue McDonald. He was educated at St. Xavier College in Cincinnati, Ohio.

== Stage and film ==
McDonald's started acting professionally in stock theater with the Forepaugh Stock Company in Cincinnati. Following eight months with it, he worked one season with a stock company in Seattle, after which he performed for three seasons with a troupe in San Diego and Honolulu. He concluded his tenure in stock theater as juvenile leading man with the American Stock Company in Spokane, Washington.

By 1913 McDonald began to perform in the rapidly expanding film industry, initially working for Marion Leonard's Monopole Company in Hollywood. He was cast in over 280 films between 1913 and 1965, including The Temptress in 1926 with Greta Garbo. After he was designated "Hollywood's Prettiest Man", McDonald sought a tougher image by shaving his mustache and seeking roles of villains.

McDonald was one of Cecil B. DeMille's favorite character actors. DeMille gave him credited supporting roles in six of his films: The Plainsman (1936), The Buccaneer (1938), Union Pacific (1939), North West Mounted Police (1940), Samson and Delilah (1949), and The Ten Commandments (1956).

== Television ==
McDonald performed in over two dozen television series during the 1950s and early 1960s, including six episodes of The Roy Rogers Show, five episodes of Lone Ranger, and four episodes each of Broken Arrow, Sugarfoot, and Perry Mason. Among his four Perry Mason roles were his portrayals of Captain Noble in the episode "The Case of the Crooked Candle" (1957) and of Salty Sims in "The Case of the Petulant Partner" (1959). He played the town savant Liveryman in "Wanted: Dead or Alive" S2 E10 "Reckless" which aired 11/6/1959. He also portrayed "Winkler" in a 1960 episode of Bat Masterson.

== Personal life and death ==
McDonald married actress Mae Busch on December 12, 1915. They divorced on November 24, 1923. He died on September 18, 1968, and was buried in Valhalla Memorial Park Cemetery in North Hollywood, California.

== Filmography ==
Film
Year	Title	Role	Notes
1913	Carmen	Don Jose	
1914	St. Elmo	Murray Hammond	
1914	The Human Soul	Robert Thompson - Alice's Suitor	
1915	The Crystal		
1916	The Price of Power	Dave Belmont - John's Son	
1916	In the Web of the Grafters	Whitey	
1916	The Devil at His Elbow	Andrew Sealey	
1916	Intolerance	Extra	Uncredited
1917	Black Orchids	George Renoir / Ivan	
1917	The Gates of Doom	Jang Sattib	
1917	Perils of the Secret Service		Serial, (Episode #3)
1917	The Voice on the Wire	Red Warren	
1917	Mr. Dolan of New York	'Spider' Flynn	
1917	The Gray Ghost	Williams	Serial
1917	The Love Doctor	Hildreth	
1918	I Love You	Jules Mardon	
1918	The Gun Woman	The Gent	
1918	Real Folks	Jimmie Dugan	
1918	The Light Within	Dr. Green	
1918	The Answer	Guidi Garcia	
1918	The Hand at the Window	Tony Brachieri	
1918	The Painted Lily	Tom Burton	
1918	The Ghost Flower	Tony Cafarelli	
1918	Tony America	Tony America	
1919	Toton the Apache	Pierre	
1919	The Final Close-Up	Jimmie Norton	
1919	The Divorce Trap	Jim Drake	
1919	His Debt	Blair Whitcomb	
1919	Love's Prisoner	Party Guest	Uncredited
1919	Pretty Smooth	Jimmy Hartigan	
1919	Prudence on Broadway	Grayson Mills	
1920	The Confession	Tom Bartlett	
1920	The Kentucky Colonel	Philip Burwood	
1920	Nomads of the North	Bucky McDougall	
1921	Puppets of Fate	Gabriel Palombra	
1921	Hearts and Masks	Galloping Dick	
1921	The Golden Snare	Pierre Thoreau	
1921	The Call of the North	Achille Picard	
1922	The Man Who Married His Own Wife	Freddie Needham	
1922	Trooper O'Neill	Pierre	
1922	Monte Cristo	Benedetto	
1922	Captain Fly-by-Night	Second Stranger	
1922	The Woman Conquers	Lawatha, Indian Guide	
1923	The Buster	Swing	
1923	Look Your Best	Alberto Cabotto	
1923	Mary of the Movies	James Seiler	
1923	Trilby	Geko	
1923	Going Up	Jules Gaillard	
1923	South Sea Love	Manuel Salarno	
1924	Arizona Express	Victor Johnson	
1924	Racing Luck	Tony Mora	
1924	East of Broadway	Professor Mario	
1924	So This Is Marriage?	Smith	
1925	The Hunted Woman	Joe De Bar	
1925	Go Straight	The Dove	
1925	Anything Once		
1925	Northern Code	Raoul La Fane	
1925	Satan in Sables	Emile	
1925	Bobbed Hair	Pooch	
1925	My Lady of Whims	Rolf	
1926	The Yankee Señor	Juan Gutiérrez	
1926	The Palace of Pleasure	Captain Fernandez	
1926	The Bar-C Mystery		
1926	Puppets	Bruno	
1926	Battling Butler	Alfred Battling Butler	
1926	The Temptress	Timoteo	
1926	The Desert's Toll	Frank Darwin	
1927	The Wreck	Joe	
1927	The Valley of Hell	Creighton Steele	
1927	The Notorious Lady	Manuela Silvera	
1927	Outlaws of Red River	Ben Tanner	
1927	Paid to Love	Apache Dancer	Uncredited
1928	A Girl in Every Port	Gang Leader	
1928	The Legion of the Condemned	Gonzolo Vasquez	
1928	The Dragnet	Sniper Dawson	
1928	The Viking	Viking Friend of Leif	Uncredited
1929	The Iron Mask	Fisherman	Uncredited
1929	The Carnation Kid	The Carnation Kid	
1929	Girl Overboard	Francisco	
1930	Burning Up	'Bullet' McGhan	
1930	Dangerous Paradise	Ricardo	
1930	The Runaway Bride	Barney Black	
1930	Safety in Numbers	Phil Kemptom	
1930	Brothers	Tony	
1930	Morocco	Caporal Tatoche	
1930	The Lash	A caballero	Uncredited
1931	The Gang Buster	Pete Caltek	
1931	The Lawyer's Secret	The Weasel	
1931	The Ruling Voice	Business Man	Uncredited
1931	In Line of Duty	Jacques Dupres	
1932	The Woman from Monte Carlo	Karkuff	
1932	The World and the Flesh	Revolutionary	Uncredited
1932	Honor of the Mounted	Jean Le Train	
1932	The Last Mile	First Gas Station Holdup Man	Uncredited
1932	70,000 Witnesses	Dominic Silvera	Uncredited
1932	Hidden Valley	Frank Gavin	
1932	Trailing the Killer	Pierre LaPlant	
1932	Texas Buddies	Blake	
1932	Madison Square Garden	Hood	Uncredited
1932	The Devil Is Driving	Ticker	Uncredited
1933	Terror Trail	Tad McPherson	
1933	Broadway Bad	Charley Davis	
1933	The Devil's in Love	Officer Reading Verdict	Uncredited
1933	Night Flight	Radioman	Uncredited
1933	Straightaway	Rogan	
1934	Voice in the Night	Henchman Jackson	
1934	Viva Villa!	Captain Arresting Pancho	Uncredited
1934	The Trumpet Blows	Vega	
1934	The Line-Up	Henchman Trigger	
1934	Sing and Like It	Mug in Restaurant	Uncredited
1934	Sadie McKee	Joe - Alderson's Chauffeur	Uncredited
1934	Operator 13	Officer Denton	Uncredited
1934	Burn 'Em Up Barnes	Ray Ridpath, race car henchman	Serial, [Chs. 1-6]
1934	Girl in Danger	Tony - Russo Henchman	Uncredited
1934	A Successful Failure	Radical Speaker in Park	Uncredited
1934	Evelyn Prentice	Charles - Chauffeur	Uncredited
1934	Red Morning	Sakki	
1934	The Gay Bride	Detroit Gangster	Uncredited
1935	The Marriage Bargain	Ben Ainsley	
1935	In Spite of Danger	Race Driver	Uncredited
1935	It Happened in New York	Henchman	Uncredited
1935	Mississippi	Gambler	Uncredited
1935	West Point of the Air	Civilian Pilot	Uncredited
1935	Star of Midnight	Kinland Henchman	Uncredited
1935	Ladies Crave Excitement	Terry	
1935	Anna Karenina	Officer at Banquet	Uncredited
1935	Diamond Jim	Gambler	Uncredited
1935	Redheads on Parade	Joe - the Film Cutter	Uncredited
1936	The Prisoner of Shark Island	John Wilkes Booth	
1936	Robin Hood of El Dorado	Pedro the Spy	
1936	Big Brown Eyes	Malley - Gunman	Uncredited
1936	Under Two Flags	Husson	
1936	White Fang	Suds	Uncredited
1936	Mummy's Boys	Rasheed Bey	
1936	Dimples	Stranger	Uncredited
1936	The Plainsman	A River Gambler	
1937	Woman-Wise	Charley	Uncredited
1937	The Devil's Playground	Romano	
1937	Criminal Lawyer	Jack 'Fingy' Doremus	Uncredited
1937	Parole Racket	Nat Beldon	
1937	The Soldier and the Lady	Chieftain	Uncredited
1937	The Last Train from Madrid	Mora	Uncredited
1937	The Devil Is Driving	Bit Part	Uncredited
1937	Born Reckless	Henchman Louie	
1937	Wild West Days	Assayer Purvis	
1937	Ali Baba Goes to Town	Ringleader	Uncredited
1937	Conquest	Cossack	Uncredited
1937	Every Day's a Holiday	Henchman #2	
1938	The Buccaneer	Camden Blount	
1938	Gun Law	Henchman Nevada	
1938	The Texans	Bit Part	Uncredited
1938	If I Were King	Casin Cholet	
1939	Idiot's Delight	Flight captain	Uncredited
1939	Juarez	Le Marc - a Creole	(scenes deleted)
1939	Union Pacific	General Grenville M. Dodge	
1939	Chasing Danger	Legionnaire with Message for Duvac	Uncredited
1939	Beau Geste	Arab Scout	Uncredited
1939	Bad Lands	Manuel Lopez	
1939	Range War	Dave Morgan	
1939	The Light That Failed	George	
1940	Green Hell	Gracco	
1940	Strange Cargo	Moussenq - Convict	Uncredited
1940	The Carson City Kid	Laramie	
1940	Captain Caution	French Seaman in Pub	Uncredited
1940	The Sea Hawk	Kroner	
1940	Wyoming	Dawson - Henchman	Uncredited
1940	North West Mounted Police	Louis Riel	
1940	One Night in the Tropics	Escobar's Aide	Uncredited
1940	The Devil's Pipeline	Gaddi Sang	
1940	The Lone Wolf Keeps a Date	Santos the Portuguese	
1941	The Sea Wolf	Svenson	
1941	Blood and Sand	Manolo's Friend	Uncredited
1941	Men of the Timberland	Jean Collett	
1941	The Kid from Kansas	Cesar	
1942	Wild Bill Hickok Rides	Kidnapper	Uncredited
1942	Valley of the Sun	Governor's Interpreter	Uncredited
1942	The Girl from Alaska	Pelly	
1943	Rhythm of the Islands	Leader of the Natives	
1943	Buckskin Frontier	Duval	
1943	The Kansan	Gil Hatton	
1943	Bar 20	Quirt Rankin	
1943	The Desert Song	French Captain	Uncredited
1944	Texas Masquerade	Sam Nolan	
1944	Lumberjack	Clyde Fenwick	
1944	Mystery Man	Bert Rogan	
1944	Bordertown Trail	Matthews	
1944	Till We Meet Again	Cart Driver	Uncredited
1944	Cheyenne Wildcat	Jim Douglas	
1944	Mystery of the River Boat	Batiste	Serial
1944	Zorro's Black Whip	Dan Hammond	
1944	Belle of the Yukon	Miner Investing on River-Freeze Date	Uncredited
1945	Great Stagecoach Robbery	Con Hollister	
1945	Corpus Christi Bandits	Dad Christie	
1945	Bad Men of the Border	Capt. Jose Garcia	
1945	South of the Rio Grande	Torres	
1945	River Gang	Indignant Man	Uncredited
1945	Strange Confession	Hernandez	
1946	The Bandit of Sherwood Forest	Robin Hood's Man	Uncredited
1946	Tangier	Sanchez	
1946	The Catman of Paris	Devereaux	
1946	Night in Paradise	High Priest	Uncredited
1946	My Pal Trigger	Storekeeper	
1946	Night Train to Memphis	Doctor	
1946	Canyon Passage	Cobb	Uncredited
1946	Notorious	Man	Uncredited
1946	The Invisible Informer	Jules Ravelle	
1946	Roll on Texas Moon	Steve Anders	
1946	The Devil's Playground	Roberts	
1946	Magnificent Doll	Jenks	Uncredited
1946	Duel in the Sun	Gambler	Uncredited
1947	Spoilers of the North	Pete Koster	
1947	Dangerous Venture	Kane - Henchman	
1947	That's My Man	Racetrack Man	Uncredited
1947	Saddle Pals	Sheriff	
1947	The Perils of Pauline	Western Saloon Set Heavy	
1947	Brute Force	Pat Regan	Uncredited
1947	Unconquered	Frontiersman	Uncredited
1948	Panhandle	Crump	
1948	The Bold Frontiersman	Adam Post	
1948	The Dead Don't Dream	Bart Lansing	
1948	Son of God's Country	Tom Ford	
1948	Strange Gamble	Longhorn	
1948	The Three Musketeers	Fisherman	Uncredited
1948	An Act of Murder	Mr. Russell	Alternative title: Live Today for Tomorrow
1948	The Paleface	Lance	Credited as Francis J. McDonald
1949	Rose of the Yukon	Alaskan	
1949	Daughter of the Jungle	Montu	
1949	Brothers in the Saddle	Hoyt Parker	
1949	Rustlers	Pierre - Roulette Wheel	Uncredited
1949	Big Jack	Basil - Prisoner	Uncredited
1949	Son of a Bad Man	Joe Christ	
1949	The Lady Gambles	Horse Trainer	Uncredited
1949	Rim of the Canyon	Charlie Lewis	
1949	Calamity Jane and Sam Bass	Horse Race Starter	Uncredited
1949	The Gal Who Took the West	O'Hara Cowhand in Town with Lee	Uncredited
1949	Abandoned	Winey - Pool Player	Uncredited
1949	Apache Chief	Mohaska	
1949	Always Leave Them Laughing	Wounded Messenger in Newark Musical	Uncredited
1949	Powder River Rustlers	Shears Williams	
1949	Samson and Delilah	Storyteller	Credited as Francis J. McDonald
1950	The Nevadan	Hotel Guest	Uncredited
1950	Woman in Hiding	North Carolina Cannoneer	Uncredited
1950	Fortunes of Captain Blood	Sailor	Uncredited
1950	Kim	Letter Writer	Uncredited
1950	California Passage	County Recorder Joe Kane	
1950	Stage to Tucson	Northern Radical	Uncredited
1951	Gene Autry and the Mounties	Batiste	
1951	Oh! Susanna	Fisher	Uncredited
1951	Santa Fe	Corporal Fletcher Murphy	Uncredited
1951	Red Mountain	Marshal Roberts	Uncredited
1952	Fort Osage	Osage Chief	
1952	Rancho Notorious	Harbin	
1952	Son of Ali Baba	Palace Official	Uncredited
1952	The Raiders	John Cummings	
1952	Ride the Man Down	Telegrapher	Uncredited
1953	San Antone	Barfly with Confederate Money	Uncredited
1953	The Bandits of Corsica	Grisha	
1953	Fort Algiers	Oil Field Foreman	Uncredited
1953	The Mississippi Gambler	Frank	Uncredited
1953	Calamity Jane	Hank	Uncredited
1954	Three Hours to Kill	Deputy Vince	
1955	Bad Day at Black Rock	Tall - White-haired Cafe Lounger	Uncredited
1955	Ten Wanted Men	Deputy Warner	Uncredited
1955	Shotgun	Dishwasher	Uncredited
1955	The Road to Denver	McGovern	Uncredited
1955	The Naked Dawn	Railroad Guard	
1955	The Vanishing American	Stage Guard	Uncredited
1955	Texas Lady	Gantz	Uncredited
1955	Dig That Uranium	Indian Chief	Uncredited
1956	Raw Edge	Chief Kiyuva	Uncredited
1956	Walk the Proud Land	The Shaman	Uncredited
1956	Thunder Over Arizona	Pliny Warren	
1956	Canyon River	1st Rancher	Uncredited
1956	The Ten Commandments	Simon	Credited as Francis J. McDonald
1957	Chain of Evidence	Felipe Rodriguez	Uncredited
1957	Duel at Apache Wells	Hank	
1957	The Guns of Fort Petticoat	Col. Chivington's Aide	Uncredited
1957	The Last Stagecoach West	Old Man Colter	
1957	Pawnee	Uncle Tip Alden	
1957	Joe Dakota	Joe Dakota	Uncredited
1958	Fort Massacre	Piute Man	
1958	The Saga of Hemp Brown	Old-Timer	Uncredited
1959	The Big Fisherman	Scribe Spokesman	
1964	Robin and the 7 Hoods	Old Man at Robbo's Club	Uncredited
1965	The Great Race	Russian	Uncredited, (final film role)
Television
Year	Title	Role	Notes
1953	The Ford Television Theatre	Carnahan	1 episode
1954	The Lineup	Warner	1 episode
1955	Adventures of Superman	Great Horse	1 episode
1955	Highway Patrol	Charlie Barrett	1 episode
1955	The Adventures of Rin Tin Tin	Soccoro - Apache Chief	1 episode
1955–1956	The Adventures of Champion	Will Calhoun	2 episodes
1956	My Friend Flicka	Thundercloud	1 episode
1956	Lassie	Clem Wyatt	1 episode
1957	Cavalcade of America	Pablo aka The Calaveras Kid	1 episode
1957	The Life and Legend of Wyatt Earp	Jake Caster	"Old Jake", with Carol Thurston in an episode based on the Sand Creek massacre He also appeared as Sam MacGuffin in "The Muleskinner" (S04,E20, undated in end credits).
1958	Tombstone Territory	Winnie Joe Westerby	1 episode
1958	Mickey Spillane's Mike Hammer	Jeb Coleman	1 episode
1958	Trackdown	Milo	1 episode
1959	Lawman	Chief Red Horse	1 episode
1959	Mr. Lucky	Old Fisherman	1 episode
1959	Maverick	Pop Talmadge	1 episode
1959	Perry Mason	Salty Sims	Season 2 Episode 25 "The Case of the Petulant Partner"
1960	Cheyenne	Sitting Bull	1 episode
1960	Wichita Town	Medicine Chief	1 episode
1960	Law of the Plainsman	Watkins	1 episode
1960	Shotgun Slade	Bonanza Jake	1 episode
1960	Bat Masterson	Winkler	1 episode
1961	The Deputy	Roy Wilkins	1 episode
1961	The Untouchables	Sully MacGuyver	1 episode
1962	Laramie	Gimp	1 episode
1963	The Virginian	Saul Weintraub	Episode "Echo of Another Day" (credited as Francis J. McDonald)
1964	The Virginian	Storekeeper	1 episode
1964	Perry Mason	Peg-Leg Jasper	1 episode
