= Rose-Marie (1928 film) =

1928 film by Lucien Hubbard

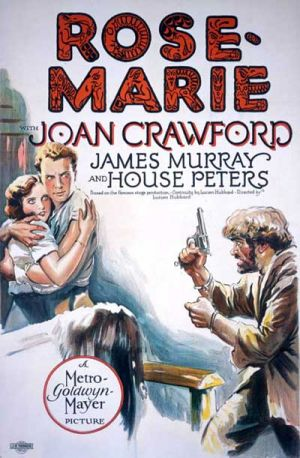
- Directed by: Lucien Hubbard
- Written by: Lucien Hubbard
- Based on: Rose-Marie; 1924 operetta by: Otto Harbach; Oscar Hammerstein II
- Starring: Joan Crawford; James Murray
- Cinematography: John Arnold
- Edited by: Carl F. Pierson
- Music by: Rudolf Friml; Herbert Stothart
- Distributed by: Metro-Goldwyn-Mayer
- Release date: February 11, 1928 (United States)
- Running time: 70 minutes
- Country: United States
- Language: Silent (English intertitles)

Rose-Marie is a 1928 American silent drama film directed by Lucien Hubbard. It was the first of three Metro-Goldwyn-Mayer adaptations of the 1924 operetta Broadway musical Rose-Marie. The best-known film adaptation starring Nelson Eddy and Jeanette MacDonald was released in 1936; another film was released in 1954. All three versions are set in the Canadian wilderness.

Portions of Rudolf Friml and Herbert Stothart's original score for the Broadway musical are utilized in the 1936 and 1954 films, but not for the silent version. MGM provided sheet music with the film for playing at the theater. Joan Crawford, who starred in the 1928 version alongside James Murray, later remarked, "Rose-Marie was surprisingly good without the music, but I felt uneasy as a French Canadian, but the critics didn't notice."

== Plot ==
Rose-Marie Lemaitre is a French-Canadian girl raised by her mountie uncle after her father is killed. She falls in love with Jim Kenyon, a handsome criminal who is hiding in the mountains, and becomes his accomplice. When her uncle and Jim's gang go after each other, Rose-Marie must choose between her loyalty to her lover and her duty to her family and country.

== Cast ==
- Joan Crawford as Rose-Marie
- James Murray as Jim Kenyon
- House Peters as Sergeant Malone
- Creighton Hale as Etienne Doray
- Gibson Gowland as Black Bastien
- George Cooper as Fuzzy
- Lionel Belmore as Henri Duray
- William Orlamond as Emile La Flamme
- Polly Moran as Lady Jane
- Harry Gribbon as Trooper Gray
- Gertrude Astor as Wanda
- Ralph Yearsley as Jean
- Sven Hugo Borg as Hudson
- Lloyd Hamilton as Fuzzy - Bearded Trapper (scenes deleted)
- Lou Costello as Extra and Stunt Performer (uncredited)
- Margaret Lee as Extra (uncredited)

== Production ==
Rose-Marie initially was filmed with Renee Adoree in the lead and William Nigh directing. After two weeks of location filming at Yosemite National Park, the studio shut down the production, fired Nigh, and brought Lucien Hubbard to produce and write a new screenplay. Another director, Edmund Goulding, was assigned, and he re-cast the picture, selecting Joan Crawford for the lead role. Goulding, although referenced in the trade press throughout the production, was ultimately not credited as director.

== Reception ==
Norbert Lusk summed up the response of New York critics: "Rose-Marie...has proved disappointing. With unusual unanimity the reviewers rate it just another story about the Northwest Mounted Police, which never reaches more than lukewarm interest in spite of good acting and, of course, beautiful scenery. It's strongest asset is its title, which will doubtless draw in the absence of word-of-mouth advertising." Mae Tinee, writing in the Chicago Daily Tribune, called the film "charming," but felt that Crawford "has not the fire and depth that Miss Adoree brings to her characterizations."

== Preservation status ==
Rose-Marie is considered to be a lost film. MGM once had a policy to destroy prints of the original film when a film was remade, so prints of this film may have been destroyed when the 1936 remake was released.
