= The Reckoning (1932 film) =

1932 film

- Directed by: Harry L. Fraser
- Written by: Leon Lee; Dwight Cummings
- Produced by: Olympic Productions
- Starring: Sally Blane; James Murray
- Cinematography: J. Henry Kruse
- Edited by: Fred Bain
- Music by: Lee Zahler
- Distributed by: Peerless Pictures
- Release date: February 15, 1932
- Running time: 63 minutes
- Country: United States
- Language: English

The Reckoning (also known as Crooked Streets) is a 1932 pre-Code talking film crime-drama directed by Harry L. Fraser and starring Sally Blane and James Murray. It was released on state rights and through a company called Peerless.

Preserved by the Library of Congress.

== Cast ==
- Sally Blane - Judy
- James Murray - Terry
- Edmund Breese - Doc
- Bryant Washburn - Bob
- Pat O'Malley - Ellis
- Thomas E. Jackson - The Detective
- Mildred Golden -
- Douglas Scott -
