= Beau Broadway =

1928 film

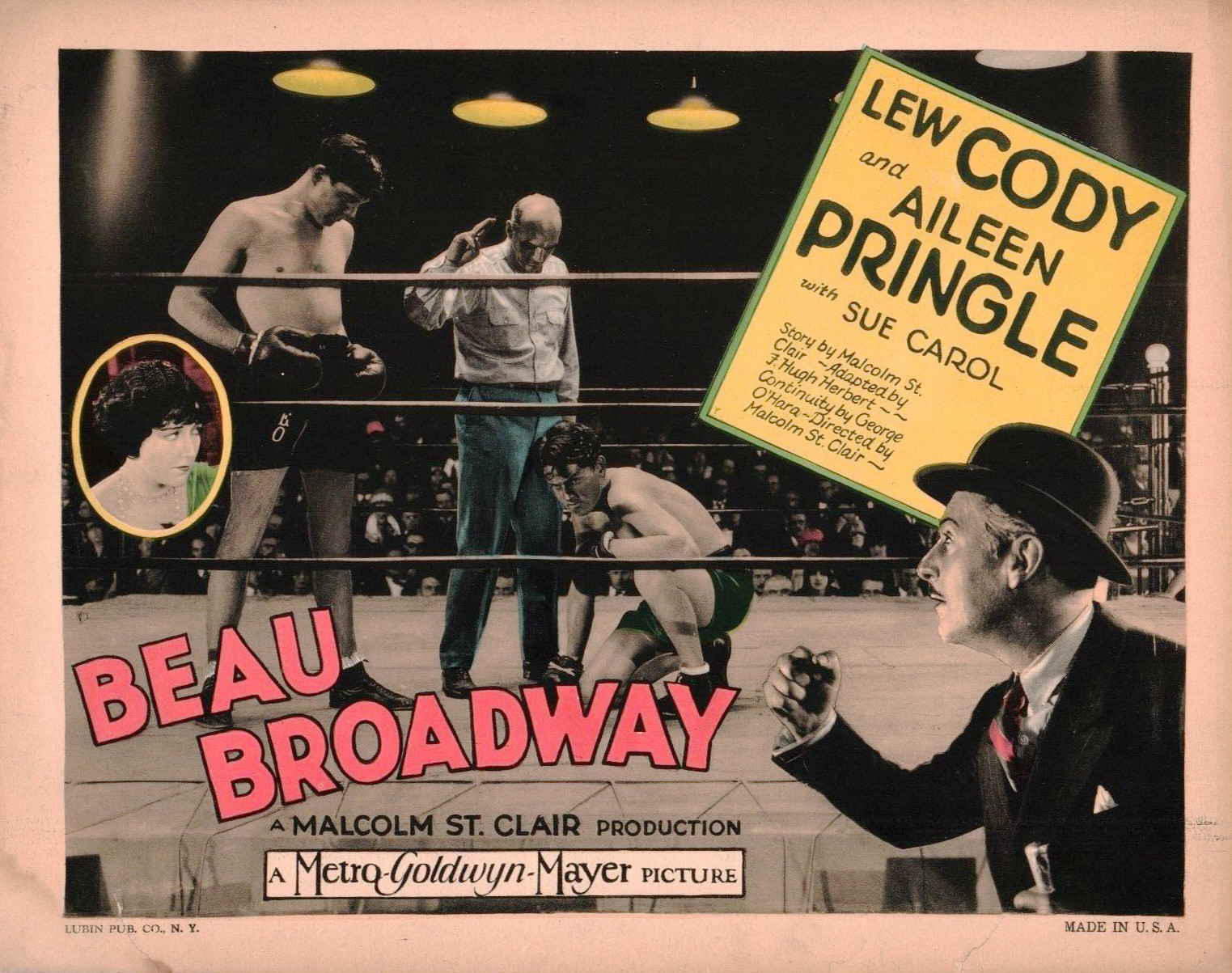
- Directed by: Malcolm St. Clair
- Screenplay by: F. Hugh Herbert; George O'Hara; Ralph Spence
- Story by: Malcolm St. Clair
- Starring: Lew Cody; Aileen Pringle; Sue Carol; Hugh Trevor; Heinie Conklin
- Cinematography: André Barlatier - (French Wikipedia)
- Edited by: Harry Reynolds
- Production company: Metro-Goldwyn-Mayer
- Distributed by: Metro-Goldwyn-Mayer
- Release date: August 15, 1928
- Running time: 70 minutes
- Country: United States
- Language: Silent..English intertitles

Beau Broadway is a lost 1928 American drama silent film directed by Malcolm St. Clair and written by F. Hugh Herbert, George O'Hara and Ralph Spence. The film stars Lew Cody, Aileen Pringle, Sue Carol, Hugh Trevor and Heinie Conklin. The film was released on August 15, 1928, by Metro-Goldwyn-Mayer.

== Plot ==
A fight promoter and gambler Jim Lambert (Lew Cody) is tasked with caring for the daughter of a dying associate. He prepares a bedroom for a child, but Mona (Sue Carol) turns out to be a young woman. Jim falls in love with her, but conceals the details of his licentious life. Rather, he poses as a man of high rectitude and Christian piety. The story revolves around his efforts to conceal his association with prizefighters (who turn out to be decent fellows) and his mistress Yvonne (Aileen Pringle). Mona, however, becomes intrigued by the demi-monde, and is attracted to one of the boxers “Killer” (Gordon Hugh Trevor). In the end, Yvonne pairs off with Killer and Mona and Jim discover true bliss.

== Cast ==
- Lew Cody as Jim Lambert
- Aileen Pringle as Yvonne
- Sue Carol as Mona
- Hugh Trevor as Killer Gordon
- Heinie Conklin as Dijuha
- Kit Guard as Prof. Griswold
- Jack Herrick as Dr. Monahan
- James J. Jeffries as Gunner O'Brien
