= On Your Back =

1930 film

- Theatrical release poster
- Directed by: Guthrie McClintic
- Screenplay by: Howard J. Green
- Story by: Rita Weiman
- Produced by: George E. Middleton
- Starring: Irene Rich; Raymond Hackett; H. B. Warner; Wheeler Oakman; Marion Shilling; Ilka Chase
- Cinematography: Joseph H. August
- Edited by: Frank E. Hull
- Production company: Fox Film Corporation
- Distributed by: Fox Film Corporation
- Release date: September 14, 1930
- Running time: 70 minutes
- Country: United States
- Language: English

On Your Back is a 1930 American pre-Code drama film directed by Guthrie McClintic and written by Howard J. Green. The film stars Irene Rich, Raymond Hackett, H. B. Warner, Wheeler Oakman, Marion Shilling and Ilka Chase. The film was released on September 14, 1930, by Fox Film Corporation. A trailer exists in the Library of Congress collection.

Actress Marion Shilling was frustrated when it became obvious that the studio was more interested in promoting Irene Rich than featuring an actress on loan. At a preview of the film, it was clear that Shilling was the standout, so cuts and re-shots were ordered. "For instance, the climactic scene of the film was one in which I, Irene's victim, at last had a chance to tell her off. My speech, to which I gave all the power I was capable of, covered an entire page of script. In the final version, how was the scene presented? Throughout the speech I was shown with my back to camera in a long shot. At frequent intervals, during my outpouring, the camera cut from my back to a huge idealized close-up of Irene."

== Plot ==
Putting a son through college, Julianne, owner of a Fifth Avenue dress shop in New York City, is persuaded to supplement her income by providing loans to struggling showgirls. The plan backfires when her son Harvey falls for her business partner's lover Jeanne Burke, who blackmails Julianne.

One contemporary review provided both a detailed synopsis and documentation of the screenplay's source: "Irene Rich is seen as a brilliant Fifth Avenue modiste who tells the lovely ladies she meets to wear their brains on their backs. The story is a Fox movietone production of Rita Weiman’s intriguing character analysis which appeared earlier this season in magazine form. It deals with the skyrocket like rise to fame of an ambitious dressmaker who rose to success through the vanity of her customers. ‘Wear Your Brains on Your Back’ is adapted early in her career as an enticement for girls of the chorus, and actresses, to pay more than they can afford for her fashionable creations. Lavish gowns and fragile, delicate negligees are the bait with which she lures them into her establishment. Credit extended freely is still further inducement for the girls to wear her expensive finery, although payment is invariably extracted for them. The dressmaker soon learns that many men are anxious to meet their customers. What better way than to have them meet casually over tea in her shop? This becomes her policy and she soon finds that men will quickly pay the bills if they are only informed their friends are in debt. But her mistake comes when she induces her son’s sweetheart to accept valuable dresses for which she cannot pay and then expects her to get the money from a wealthy man who also admires her. The outcome of this tangle in which ambition clashes with mother love is forcefully portrayed by an excellent cast.”

== Cast ==
- Irene Rich as Julianne
- Raymond Hackett as Harvey
- H. B. Warner as Raymond Pryor
- Wheeler Oakman as 'Lucky' Jim Seymour
- Marion Shilling as Jeanne Burke
- Ilka Chase as Dixie Mason
- Charlotte Henry as Belle
- Rose Dione as Mrs. Dupinnet
- Arthur Hoyt as Victor
