= Richard Carlyle (actor, born 1879) =

Canadian actor

- Born: May 21, 1879; Guelph, Ontario, Canada
- Died: June 12, 1942 (Age 63); San Fernando, California
- Other name: Richard Carlysle
- Occupation: actor
- Spouse: Mirza Marston

Richard Carlyle (May 21, 1879 – June 12, 1942) was a Canadian born stage and film actor. He is not to be confused with later actor Richard Carlyle. After stage experience, he began appearing in silent films in 1913.

== Selected filmography ==
- The Bridge of Sighs (1915) - Bill Stevens
- The Purple Night (1915, Short) - Stanley Cross - Carol's Fiance
- An Enemy to Society (1915)
- Wilful Peggy (1915, Short)
- A Bold Deception (1917, Short)
- Spotlight Sadie (1919)
- The Copperhead (1920) - Lem Tollard
- The Stolen Kiss (1920) - James Burrell
- The Inside of the Cup (1921) - Richard Garvin
- Out of the Chorus (1921) - Maddox
- Ten Nights in a Bar Room (1921) - The Village Doctor
- Women Men Marry (1922) - Adam Page
- Back Home and Broke (1922) - John Thorne
- Haldane of the Secret Service (1923) - Joe Ivors
- Shootin' Irons (1927) - Jim Blake
- Lingerie (1928) - Pembrokee
- Brotherly Love (1928) - Warden Brown
- Taking a Chance (1928) - Dan Carson
- Children of the Ritz (1929) - Mr. Pennington
- Hearts in Dixie (1929) - White Doctor
- It Can Be Done (1929) - Rogers
- The Valiant (1929) - Father Daly
- The Girl in the Show (1929) - Leon Montrose
- In Old California (1929) - Arturo
- Playing Around (1930) - Pa Miller
- Guilty? (1930) - Dr. Bennett
- Hide-Out (1930) - Dean
- Mountain Justice (1930) - Judge Keats
- The Girl of the Golden West (1930) - Jim Larkins
- Kismet (1930) - The Muezzin
- Tol'able David (1930) - Doctor
- Five Star Final (1931) - First Newstand Proprietor (uncredited)
- Quick Trigger Lee (1931) - John 'Dad' Sanders
- West of Broadway (1931) - Butler (uncredited)
- The Wide Open Spaces (1931, Short) - The Masque
- The Saddle Buster (1932) - Bible Jude
- Rule 'Em and Weep (1932, Short) - The Masque
- Unholy Love (1932) - Mr. Bailey
- Midnight Club (1933) - Minor Role (uncredited)
- Sons of Steel (1934) - Tom Mason
- When a Man's a Man (1935) - Dean Baldwin - Cross Triangle Owner
- Public Opinion (1935) - Dr. Rand
- Happiness C.O.D. (1935) - Rev. Huxley
- Tango (1936) - Minor Role (uncredited)
- The Country Doctor (1936) - Bishop (uncredited)
- The Lion Man (1936) - Hassan El Dinh (final film role)
