= Secret Sinners (1933 film) =

- Directed by: Wesley Ford
- Written by: F. McGrew Willis
- Produced by: Wesley Ford
- Starring: Jack Mulhall; Sue Carol; Nick Stuart
- Cinematography: James S. Brown Jr.
- Edited by: Fred Bain
- Music by: Lee Zahler
- Production company: Wesley Ford Productions
- Distributed by: Mayfair Pictures
- Release date: October 20, 1933
- Running time: 70 minutes
- Country: United States
- Language: English

Secret Sinners is a 1933 American pre-Code drama film directed by Wesley Ford and starring Jack Mulhall, Sue Carol and Nick Stuart.

== Cast ==
- Jack Mulhall as Jeff Gilbert
- Sue Carol as Sue Marsh
- Nick Stuart as Jimmy Stafford
- Cecilia Parker as Margie Dodd
- Natalie Moorhead as Mrs. Gilbert
- Armand Kaliz as Armand Blum
- Bert Roach as The Out of Work Actor
- Gertrude Short as Sue's Chum - the Chorus Girl
- Eddie Kane as Mr. Edwards - the Stage Manager
- William Humphrey as The Music Publisher
- Tom Ricketts as Pop - the Stage Doorman
- Paul Ellis as Travers - the Gigolo
- Lillian Leighton as Mrs. Simmons
- Phillips Smalley as Lawyer Marsh
- Lee Zahler as Lee Zahler - Orchestra Leader
- Harry Barris as Harry Barris - Pianist

== Bibliography ==
- Michael R. Pitts. Poverty Row Studios, 1929–1940: An Illustrated History of 55 Independent Film Companies, with a Filmography for Each. McFarland & Company, 2005.
