= Spotlight Sadie =

1919 film

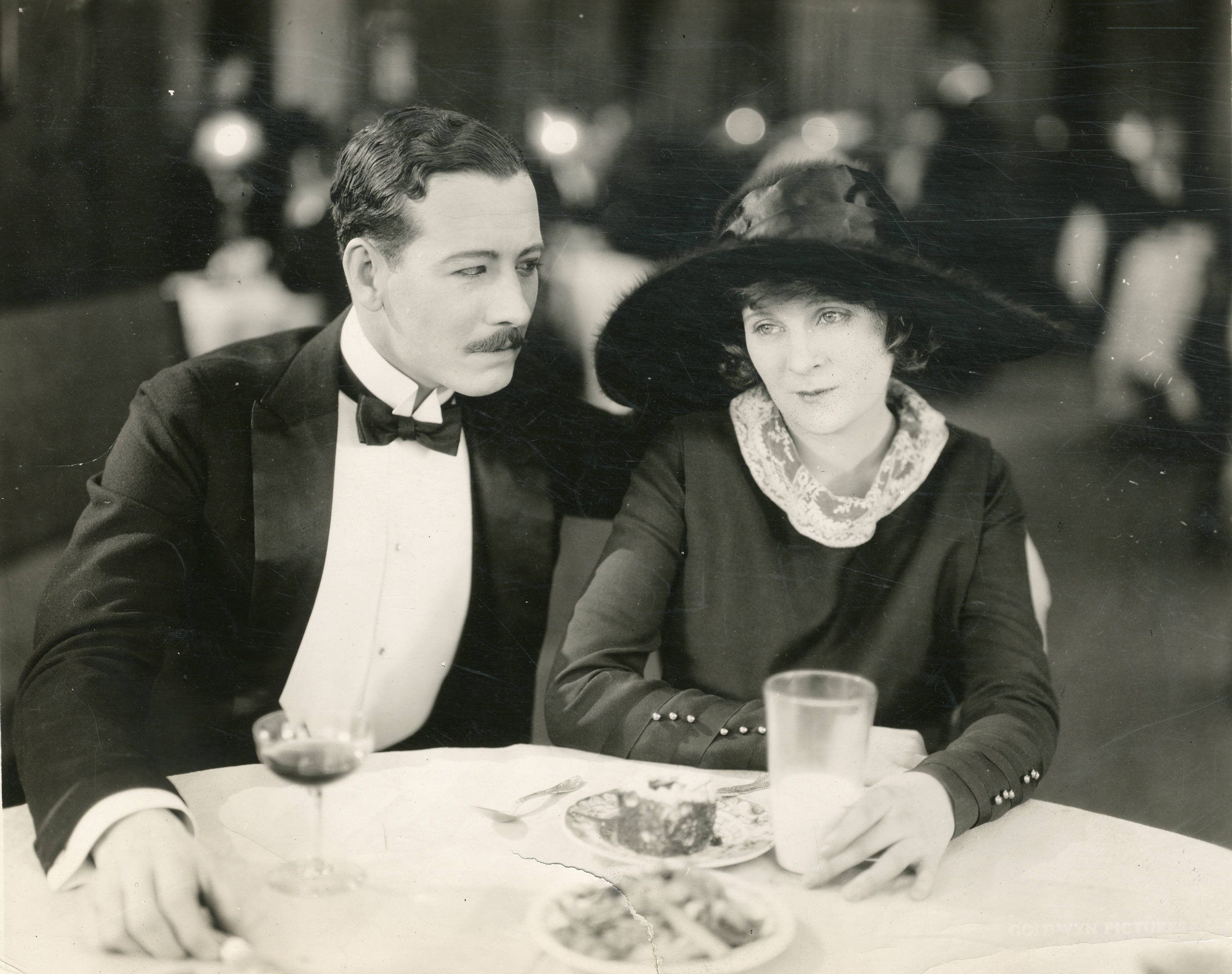
- Still with Philo McCullough and Mae Marsh
- Directed by: Laurence Trimble
- Written by: Charles J. Wilson
- Story by: Lewis Allen Browne
- Produced by: Samuel Goldwyn
- Starring: Mae Marsh; Wallace MacDonald
- Cinematography: Edwin W. Willat
- Distributed by: Goldwyn Pictures
- Release date: April 6, 1919
- Running time: 5 reels
- Country: United States
- Language: Silent (English intertitles)

Spotlight Sadie is a lost 1919 American silent film drama directed by Laurence Trimble and starring Mae Marsh and Wallace MacDonald. It was produced and distributed by Goldwyn Pictures. It was alternately known as The Saintly Show Girl.

== Cast ==
- Mae Marsh as Sadie Sullivan
- Wallace MacDonald as Dick Carrington
- Mary Thurman as Hazel Harris
- Betty Schade as Dollie Delmar
- Alec B. Francis as Reverend John Page
- Walter Hiers as Jack Mills
- Philo McCullough as Reggie Delmar
- Wellington Playter as O'Keefe
- Lou Salter as Nancy O'Keefe
- Richard Carlyle
- Alice Davenport
