= In Line of Duty =

1931 film

- Directed by: Bert Glennon
- Written by: George Arthur Durlam
- Produced by: Trem Carr
- Starring: Sue Carol; Noah Beery; Francis McDonald
- Cinematography: Archie Stout
- Edited by: Leonard Wheeler
- Production company: Trem Carr Pictures
- Distributed by: Monogram Pictures
- Release date: November 28, 1931
- Running time: 59 minutes
- Country: United States
- Language: English

In Line of Duty is a 1931 American Western film directed by Bert Glennon and starring Sue Carol, Noah Beery and Francis McDonald. It was one of the earliest releases of Trem Carr's Monogram Pictures. It is now considered a lost film.

== Plot ==
A Canadian Mountie officer pursuing a fugitive from the law is left in a moral conundrum when the fugitive saves his life.

== Cast ==
- Sue Carol as Felice Duchene
- Noah Beery as Jean Duchene
- Francis McDonald as Jacques Dupres
- James Murray as Cpl. Sherwood
- Richard Cramer as Hugh Fraser
- Frank Seider as Constable
- Henry Hall as Inspector

== Bibliography ==
- American Film Institute Catalog: Feature Films, 1931–1940, Volumes 1–3. University of California Press, 1993.
