= James Murray (American actor) =

American movie actor

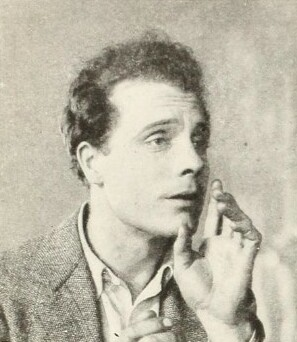
- A photograph of Murray published in Screenland (1927)
- Born: James T. Murray; February 9, 1901; The Bronx, New York City, U.S.
- Died: July 11, 1936 (aged 35); North River, New York City, U.S.
- Resting place: Calvary Cemetery
- Occupation: Actor
- Years active: 1924–1936
- Spouse(s): Lucille McNames (m. 1928; div.1930) Marion Sayers (m. 1933)

James T. Murray (February 9, 1901 – July 11, 1936) was an American film actor best known for starring in the 1928 film The Crowd.

== Early life ==
Born in The Bronx, Murray was the second of seven children of Mary (née Casserly) and Christopher Murray. His mother was a native of Ireland, as was his father, who by 1910 was employed in New York as an insurance inspector for the Metropolitan Life Insurance Company.

== Career ==
In 1923, Murray made his film debut as Captain John Alden in the Pilgrims, a three-reel production shot at Yale University in New Haven, Connecticut and surrounding area locations. In 1924, Murray moved to Hollywood with hopes of continuing an acting career. Over the next three years, Murray found film work, mostly as an extra. In 1927, Murray got his break when he was "discovered" by director King Vidor who was then in pre-production for his next film, The Crowd. Vidor saw Murray walking near the casting office on the M-G-M lot and thought Murray looked right for the lead role. Murray, however, failed to show up for a meeting arranged by Vidor, apparently thinking the prospective offer was a joke. Vidor tracked Murray down and eventually cast him as “the ordinary man as hero” John Sims. Upon its premiere in March 1928, The Crowd was a critical and financial success and Murray's performance was lauded by both the critics and the public. Before the film's release, but after working in Vidor's production, Murray got another boost towards stardom when reshoots occurred for Rose-Marie and he was given the lead role opposite Joan Crawford in the film, released in February 1928.

Following The Crowd, Murray appeared in the Warner Bros. comedy The Little Wildcat. Later that year, he starred opposite Lon Chaney in The Big City, followed by a supporting role in Chaney's final silent film Thunder in 1929. Thunder would also be Murray's last film for M-G-M in which he had a significant role. In 1929, Murray made the transition from silent to sound films in the part-talkie The Shakedown for Universal Pictures.

By 1930, Murray's once promising career had begun to falter due to his increasing alcoholism and alcohol related arrests. In August 1930, Murray was sentenced to six months in jail for appearing in court drunk on a previous drunk-driving charge. After serving four months of hard labor, Murray was released and attempted to reignite his acting career. He stopped drinking for a time and, in February 1933, he signed a seven-year contract with First National Pictures and Warner Bros. The same year, he married beauty pageant contestant ("Miss Florida") and actress Marion Sayers. The marriage and Murray's sobriety proved to be short lived; Sayers was granted a divorce in November 1933 on the grounds that Murray drank excessively and forced her to work to support him.

By 1934, Murray was unable to secure acting work due to his alcoholism and began panhandling. By that time, director King Vidor (who had cast Murray in The Crowd seven years earlier) was casting for his film Our Daily Bread (1934) and had Murray in mind for the lead role. Vidor had heard of Murray’s plight and immediately set about finding him. He soon found a much heavier and unkempt Murray panhandling on the street and offered to buy him a drink. Vidor then offered Murray the lead role, provided Murray pull himself together. Murray rejected the offer and reportedly told Vidor, "Just because I stop you on the street and try to borrow a buck you think you can tell me what to do. As far as I am concerned, you know what you can do with your lousy part."

Murray appeared in a total of thirty-six films over the course of his twelve-year film career. In the majority of his films in the sound era, particularly those made during the last few years of his career, he was cast in bit parts or as an uncredited extra. Murray's final onscreen appearance was as an uncredited “earthquake survivor” in the 1936 disaster drama San Francisco.

== Death ==
On July 11, 1936, Murray drowned after falling or jumping from the North River pier in New York City. The medical examiner determined that the cause was "asphyxia by submersion," without ruling on whether his death was an accident or suicide. He was interred at the Calvary Cemetery in Woodside, Queens, New York.

Decades later Vidor, haunted by Murray's decline and early death, wrote a screenplay titled The Actor, although his work never was produced.

== Filmography ==
Year	Title	Role	Notes
1924	The Pilgrims	John Alden	Short film
1927	Tillie the Toiler	One of Tillie's Admirers in Restaurant	Uncredited
1927	In Old Kentucky	Jimmy Brierly	
1927	The Lovelorn	Charlie	Lost film
1928	Rose-Marie	Jim Kenyon	Lost film
1928	The Big City	Curly	Lost film
1928	The Crowd	John "Johnny" Sims	
1928	The Little Wildcat	Conrad Burton	Lost film
1929	Thunder	Tommy	Lost film
1929	The Shakedown	Dave Roberts	
1929	Shanghai Lady	'Badlands' McKinney	
1930	Hide-Out	Jimmy Dorgan	
1930	The Rampant Age	Sandy Benton	
1930	Bright Lights	Connie Lamont	
1931	Kick In	Benny LaMarr	
1931	Hold 'er Sheriff	Jimmy Dalton	Short film
1931	Trapped	Jimmy Dare	Short film
1931	In Line of Duty	Cpl. Sherwood	
1932	The Reckoning	Terry	
1932	Alaska Love	Freddie Watson	Short film
1932	The Hollywood Handicap	Character	Short film
1932	Bachelor Mother	Joe Bigelow	
1932	Frisco Jenny	Dan McAllister	
1933	Baby Face	Brakeman	Uncredited
1933	High Gear	Mark "High Gear" Sherrod	a.k.a. The Big Thrill
1933	Air Hostess	Ted Hunter	
1933	Central Airport	Eddie Hughes	
1933	Heroes for Sale	Blind Soldier	
1933	Havana Widows	Bank Teller	Uncredited
1934	Now I'll Tell	Henchman with Curtis	Uncredited
1935	$20 a Week	Peter Douglas	
1935	The Drunkard	Edward Middleton	
1935	The Informer	Bit role	Uncredited
1935	Ship Cafe	Gerald	Uncredited
1935	Skull and Crown	Matt - Henchman	
1936	Rose-Marie	Bit Part	Uncredited
1936	San Francisco	Earthquake Survivor	Uncredited
