= It Can Be Done (1929 film) =

1929 film

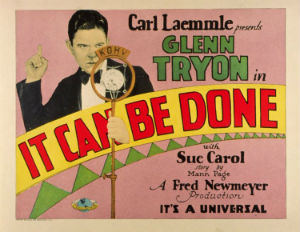
- Theatrical release poster
- Directed by: Fred C. Newmeyer
- Screenplay by: Joseph F. Poland; Earle Snell; Nan Cochrane; Albert DeMond
- Story by: Mann Page; Edward J. Montagne
- Starring: Glenn Tryon; Sue Carol; Richard Carlyle; Richard Carle; Jack Egan; Tom O'Brien
- Cinematography: Ross Fisher
- Edited by: Ted J. Kent
- Production company: Universal Pictures
- Distributed by: Universal Pictures
- Release date: March 24, 1929
- Running time: 60 minutes
- Country: United States
- Languages: Sound (Part-Talkie); English Intertitles

It Can Be Done is a 1929 American sound part-talkie comedy film directed by Fred C. Newmeyer and written by Joseph F. Poland, Earle Snell, Nan Cochrane and Albert DeMond. The film stars Glenn Tryon, Sue Carol, Richard Carlyle, Richard Carle, Jack Egan and Tom O'Brien. In addition to sequences with audible dialogue or talking sequences, the film features a synchronized musical score and sound effects along with English intertitles. The soundtrack was recorded using the Western Electric sound-on-film system. The film was released on March 24, 1929, by Universal Pictures.

== Cast ==
- Glenn Tryon as Jerry Willard
- Sue Carol as Anne Rogers
- Richard Carlyle as Rogers
- Richard Carle as Watson
- Jack Egan as Ben Smith
- Tom O'Brien as Detective

== See also ==
- List of early sound feature films (1926–1929)
