= Bachelor Mother (1932 film) =

1932 film

- Directed by: Charles Hutchison
- Written by: Al Boasberg
- Screenplay by: Paul Gangelin; Luther Reed
- Produced by: Ken Goldsmith
- Starring: Evalyn Knapp; James Murray
- Cinematography: Edward Kull
- Edited by: Louis Sackin
- Production companies: Goldsmith Productions, Ltd.
- Distributed by: State Rights
- Release date: December 14, 1932 (USA)
- Running time: 70 min.
- Country: United States
- Language: English

Bachelor Mother is a 1932 pre-Code action film directed by Charles Hutchison.

== Plot ==
A conniving young man is brought up on charges of reckless driving. To "prove" his innocence and good character, he goes to a nursing home and adopts an old woman whom he presents as his loving mother. Unfortunately for him, she really gets into her role and when he falls in love with a seductive, shady lady, the old lady does all she can to protect him from her; this includes getting him tossed in jail and shooting the young trollop. Afterward, the old lady must stand trial.

== Cast ==
- Evalyn Knapp as Mary Somerset
- James Murray as Joe Bigelow
- Margaret Seddon as Cynthia Wilson
- Paul Page as Arthur Hall
- Astrid Allwyn as Lola Butler
- Harry Holman as Judge Yates
- Virginia Sale as Mrs. Stone
