= Nick Stuart =

American actor (1904–1973)

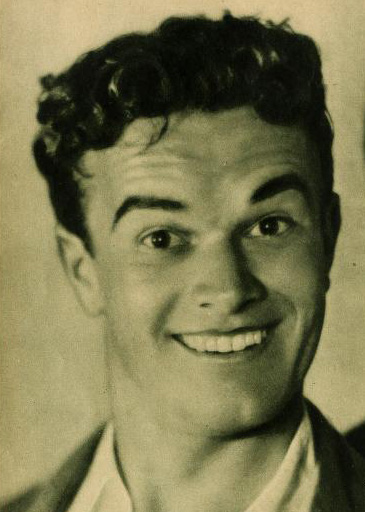
- Stuart in 1928
- Born: Niculae Pratza; April 10, 1904; Abrudbánya, Alsó-Fehér County, Austria-Hungary (now Abrud, Alba County, Romania)
- Died: April 7, 1973 (aged 68); Biloxi, Mississippi, United States
- Occupations: Actor, bandleader
- Years active: 1919–44
- Spouse(s): Sue Carol (1929-34); Martha Burnett (1942-73, his death)
- Children: Carol Lee Ladd

Nick Stuart (April 10, 1904 – April 7, 1973) was an Austro-Hungarian-born American actor and bandleader. His career spanned five decades, during which he appeared in over 50 films, more than half of them features, as well as film shorts, serials, and even one television appearance. He rose to stardom in such films as Girls Gone Wild and Chasing Through Europe, prior to expanding his business interests by creating a talent agency, and a popular upscale club in Hollywood.

After being introduced to music by Guy Lombardo, he established his own band, "The Man with the Band from Movieland", which played for over twenty years. When he dissolved the band in 1961, he opened a haberdashery in Biloxi, Mississippi. He met his first wife, Sue Carol, while working on a film, and the two had a daughter, actress Carol Lee Ladd. While his first marriage was short-lived, his second marriage to Martha Burnett lasted over thirty years, until his death from cancer in 1973.

== Early life and family ==
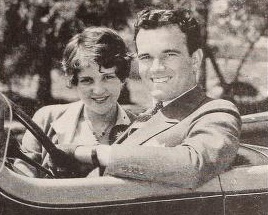
Nick Stuart and wife Sue Carol in 1930

Stuart was born Niculae Pratza on April 10, 1904, in Abrud (Abrudbánya), Transylvania, then part of Austria-Hungary. He emigrated to the United States as a child in 1913, growing up in Dayton, Ohio.

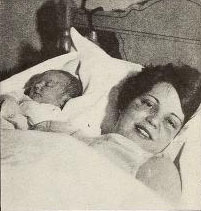
Sue Carol, with her new baby, Carol Lee

Stuart was married twice. The first time was to Sue Carol on November 28, 1929; the two had a child, actress Carol Lee Ladd (born July 18, 1932). The "Lee" in Carol Lee was named for Carol's best friend, Dixie Lee, the wife of Bing Crosby. Initially, the couple attempted to hide their marriage from the public, with the help of the Crosbys. Stuart would make public appearances with Dixie Lee, while Bing Crosby would feign romantic interest in Sue Carol in public. While on a personal appearances tour in 1931, the couple had $35,000 of jewelry stolen from their parked car on Michigan Avenue in Chicago.

Less than a year after the birth of the couple's child, reports began to circulate that their marriage was in trouble. By August 1933, Stuart and Carol were estranged and living separate lives, and divorced in 1934. After the divorce, Stuart was romantically linked with several other women, including nightclub singer Bobbe Arnst (recently divorced from Johnny Weissmuller), and Dorothy Lee.

== Career ==
=== Film ===
In the mid-1920s Nick Prata (as he was then known) began working in the film industry, doing odd jobs around the set for Fox Film, such as prop boy, script clerk, and assistant cameraman. While working as an assistant on Raoul Walsh's What Price Glory? in 1926, Prata was given a screen test, after which his name was changed to Nick Stuart. Shortly after, he became Howard Hawks's personal assistant. He appeared in minor roles in two film shorts, before being given an opportunity to act in a featured role by Hawks, in 1927's, The Cradle Snatchers. After the success of The Cradle Snatchers, Stuart would star in several shorts, many of which again paired him with his Snatchers co-star, Sally Phipps, which included Gentlemen Prefer Scotch, and Cupid and the Clock (based on a short story by O. Henry). The two would star in Stuart's next three films in 1927 and 1928: High School Hero, Why Sailors Go Wrong, and News Parade. Stuart's next role was that of Sandy, starring alongside Victor McLaglen in William K. Howard's The River Pirate in 1928. Stuart and Sue Carol had been linked together romantically since early in 1928, and would co-star in Stuart's next project, Girls Gone Wild.

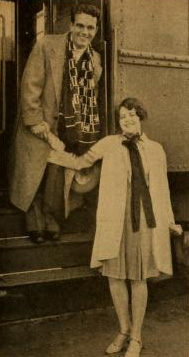
Sue Carol greeting Nick Stuart at Union Station in Los Angeles, after his return from location filming in Europe for Chasing Through Europe.

Stuart and Phipps appeared together in his next film, although Phipps was in a secondary role. Stuart's co-star in 1929's Joy Street, was Lois Moran, who had also been his love interest in The River Pirate. Stuart and Phipps were again slated to co-star in Chasing Through Europe, the sequel to their successful film, News Parade. However, she was replaced by June Collyer in July 1928, who was replaced in turn by Sue Carol in September. Stuart and Carol appeared in several films together over the next few years, including 1933's Secret Sinners.

=== Agency days ===
In 1933 Stuart, along with David Kay, opened an agency in Hollywood, which represented actors, writers, and directors. Later that year, their company signed an agreement with the Canadian film company, British Commonwealth Productions, to cast all of their films. The first film they cast was The Crimson West (released in the United States as Fighting Playboy), which would be the first full-length talking film produced in Canada. The following year, he became the founder of the Bath and Tennis Club in Hollywood. The club was modeled on upscale clubs in the east, particularly those in Palm Beach and Long Island, New York, and included recreational facilities for tennis, squash, swimming, badminton, and handball.

=== Entrance into music and later acting career ===
In the midst of his film career, after Guy Lombardo got him interested in music, Stuart began his own big band, and became known as "The Man with the Band from Movieland". Stuart had become friendly with Lombardo when he and his wife, Carol, had helped Lombardo's brother adopt a child in 1932. By 1937, Stuart's band had achieved a modicum of fame, and had appeared in several film shorts, including 1938's Twenty Girls and a Band. After the creation of his band, Stuart would only sporadically appear in films over the next 20 years. In the 1940s, he appeared in two of the Bowery Boys films, starring Leo Gorcey and Huntz Hall, Mr. Muggs Steps Out (1943), and Pride of the Bowery (1946). Stuart's last starring role would be in the 1946 film, Gunsmoke.

From 1946 through 1963 Stuart would appear in only four more films, although he appeared in several film serials, such as The Lost Planet (1953), Blackhawk: Fearless Champion of Freedom (1952), and King of the Congo (1952). Stuart's sole television appearance was a featured role in the final episode of Navy Log, which aired on September 11, 1958. In the 1960s, he made his final film appearance in a small role in Sydney Pollack's drama This Property Is Condemned, starring Natalie Wood, Robert Redford, and Charles Bronson.

== Later life and death ==
Stuart married Martha Burnett in 1942, with whom he remained married until his death in 1973. Stuart dissolved his band in 1961, after which he opened a haberdashery in Biloxi, Mississippi, located in the Broadwater Beach Hotel. Stuart died from cancer on April 7, 1973, in Biloxi, Mississippi.

== Filmography ==
(Per AFI database, and imdb.com. Feature films except as noted.)

- The Cradle Snatchers (1927) as Henry Winton
- High School Hero (1927) as Pete Greer
- News Parade (1928) as 'Newsreel Nick' Naylor
- The River Pirate (1928) as Sandy
- Why Sailors Go Wrong (1928) as Jimmy Collier
- Chasing Through Europe (1929) as Dick Stallings
- Girls Gone Wild (1929) as Buck Brown
- Joy Street (1929) as Joe
- Why Leave Home? (1929) as Dick
- Happy Days (1929) as himself
- The Fourth Alarm (1930) as Dick Turner
- Swing High (1930) as Billy
- The Mystery Train (1931) as Ronald Stanhope
- Sheer Luck (1931) as Jimmie Reid
- Trapped (1931) as Jerry Coleman
- Sundown Trail (1931) as Flash Prescott
- Fighting Playboy (1933) as Don
- Secret Sinners (1933) as Jimmy Stafford
- Police Call (1933) as Dynamite Danny Daniels
- A Demon for Trouble (1934) as Buck Morton
- Secrets of Chinatown (1935) as Robert Rand
- Put on the Spot (1936) as George Bates (archive footage)
- Rio Grande Romance (1936) as George Bates
- Blake of Scotland Yard (1937, Serial) as Julot [Chs. 2–4, 9–10, 14]
- Pride of the Bowery (1940) as Forest Ranger
- Mr. Muggs Steps Out (1943) as Diamonds Hamilton
- Journey Together (1945)
- Gunsmoke (1946) as Brad Marlowe / Brad's Son
- Blackhawk: Fearless Champion of Freedom (1952, Serial) as Cress
- King of the Congo (1952, Serial) as Degar
- The Lost Planet (1953, Serial) as Darl
- The Great Adventures of Captain Kidd (1953, Serial) as Dr. Brandt [Chs. 4–7,9]
- Killer Ape (1953) as Maron
- The French Line (1953) as Reporter (uncredited)
- It's a Mad, Mad, Mad, Mad World (1963)
- This Property Is Condemned (1966) as Railroad Conductor (uncredited)
