= Faithless Lover =

1928 film

- Directed by: Lawrence C. Windom
- Written by: Baroness D'Arville (story); Jack Murray; Sam Sherman
- Produced by: Sherman S. Krellberg
- Starring: Eugene O'Brien; Gladys Hulette; Raymond Hackett
- Cinematography: Frank Zucker
- Production company: Krelbar Pictures Corporation
- Distributed by: Collwyn Pictures Corporation
- Release date: January 1928
- Running time: 57 minutes
- Country: United States
- Languages: Silent; English intertitles

Faithless Lover is a 1928 American silent drama film directed by Lawrence C. Windom and starring Eugene O'Brien, Gladys Hulette and Raymond Hackett.

== Cast ==
- Eugene O'Brien as Austin Kent
- Gladys Hulette as Mary Callender
- Raymond Hackett as Harry Ayres
- Jane Jennings as Mrs. Seeton
- James S. Barrett as Bert Rogers
- George De Carlton as Charles Dunbar

== Bibliography ==
- Munden, Kenneth White. The American Film Institute Catalog of Motion Pictures Produced in the United States, Part 1. University of California Press, 1997.
