= Sue Carol =

American actress and talent agent (1906–1982)

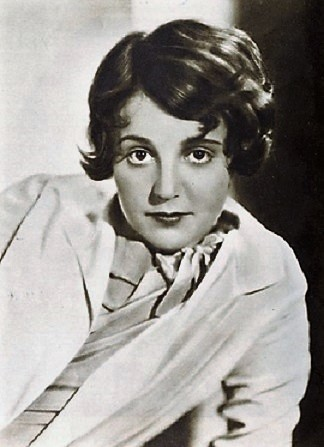
- Carol in 1931
- Born: Evelyn Jean Lederer; October 30, 1906; Chicago, Illinois, U.S.
- Died: February 4, 1982 (aged 75); Los Angeles, California, U.S.
- Resting place: Forest Lawn Memorial Park, Glendale, California
- Occupations: Actress; talent agent
- Years active: 1927–1937
- Spouses: Allen H. Keefer (m. 1924; div. 1929); Nick Stuart (m. 1929; div. 1934); Harold Wilson (m. 1936; div. 1942); Alan Ladd (m. 1942; died 1964)
- Children: 3, including David Ladd

Sue Carol (born Evelyn Jean Lederer; October 30, 1906 – February 4, 1982) was an American actress and talent agent. Carol's film career lasted from the late 1920s into the 1930s; when it ended, she became a talent agent. The last of her four marriages was to one of her clients, Alan Ladd, from 1942 until his death in 1964.

== Early life and career ==
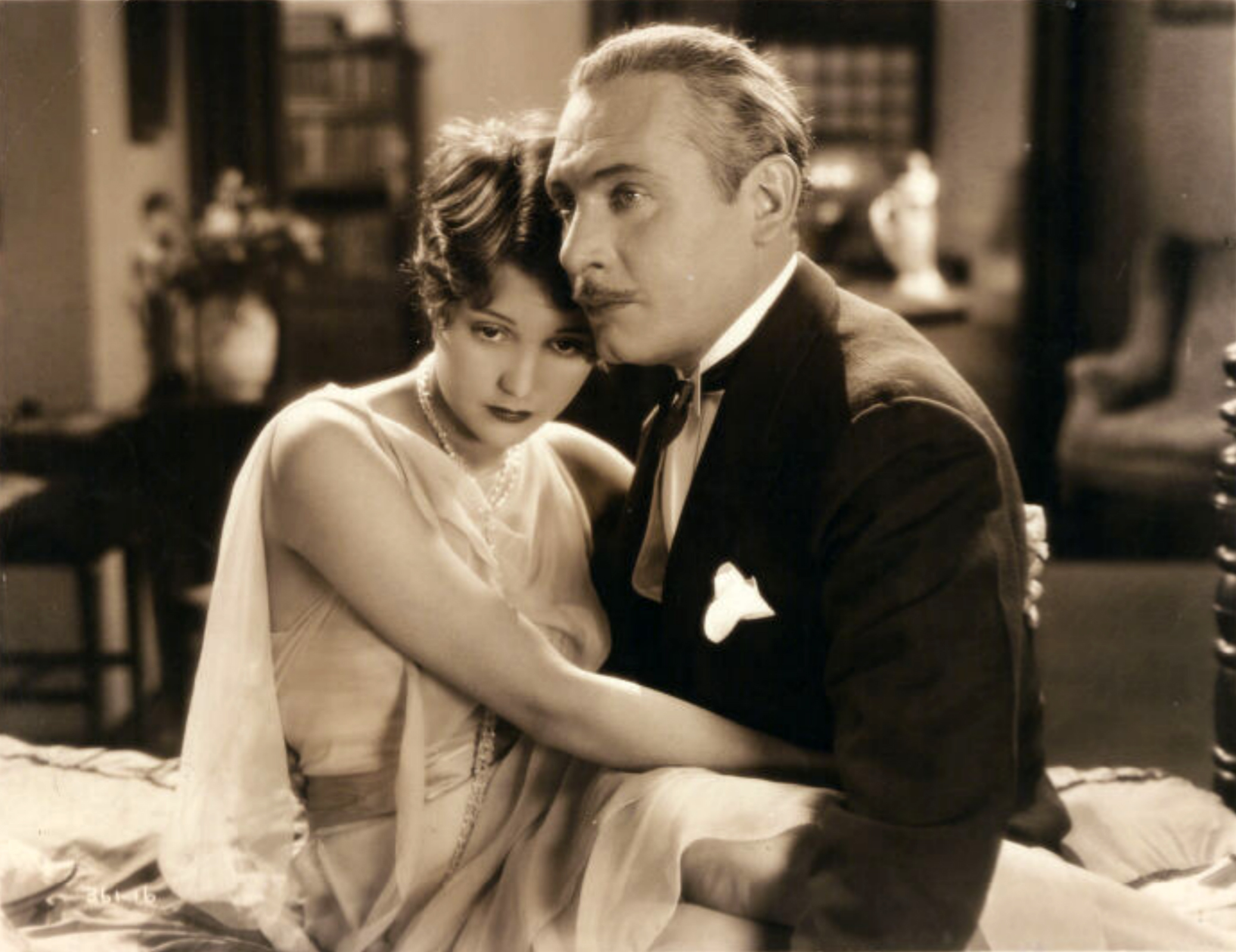
Carol with Lew Cody in Beau Broadway (1928)

Carol was born Evelyn Jean Lederer in Chicago, Illinois, to Samuel and Caroline Lederer, Jewish emigrants from Austria and Germany, respectively.

While Carol was in Hollywood on vacation, a director offered her a screen test that resulted in a contract with Fox. She took it and began playing minor parts. One of the WAMPAS Baby Stars, she performed in motion pictures from 1927 until 1937.

Among the movies in which she appeared are Fox Movietone Follies of 1929 and Girls Gone Wild (both 1929). Her films were made in association with producer Cecil B. DeMille and Metro-Goldwyn-Mayer. After retiring from acting in the late 1930s, Carol established her own talent agency, the Sue Carol Agency.

== Personal life ==
As a young woman, Carol married Allen H. Keefer, a buyer for a Chicago stock yard firm, divorcing in early 1929. In July 1929, Carol became engaged to actor Nick Stuart, and the couple married that November. They had a daughter, actress Carol Lee Ladd (born 1932), who was briefly married to actor Richard Anderson. In 1933, Sue Carol was cleared in a case involving the disappearance of a baby from a Brooklyn, New York family. The family had complained that the baby had been taken for adoption in November 1932 by a woman who said she was acting on behalf of Carol. The Stuarts divorced in 1934. On Oct. 30, 1936 in Los Angeles, Carol married for the third time to fellow actor William Harold Wilson. That marriage also ended in divorce.

She married actor Alan Ladd on March 15, 1942, in Mexico. They had a son, David, and a daughter, Alana Ladd Jackson (married to radio commentator Michael Jackson). Carol was also the stepmother of Alan Ladd, Jr. She was Alan Ladd's manager until his death.

== Death ==
Carol died on February 4, 1982, in Los Angeles, California, from a heart attack and is interred next to Alan Ladd in the Forest Lawn Memorial Park Cemetery in Glendale, California.

For her contribution to the motion picture industry, in 1982, Carol has a star on the Hollywood Walk of Fame at 1639 N. Vine Street. In 1998, a Golden Palm Star on the Palm Springs, California, Walk of Stars was dedicated to her.

== Filmography ==
Film
Year	Title	Role	Notes
1927	Slaves of Beauty	Dorothy Jones	Lost film
1927	Soft Cushions	The Girl	Lost film
1928	The Cohens and the Kellys in Paris	Sadye Cohen	
1928	Skyscraper	Sally	
1928	Walking Back	Patsy Schuyler	
1928	Beau Broadway	Mona	Lost film
1928	Win That Girl	Gloria Havens	Lost film
1928	The Air Circus	Sue Manning	Lost film
1928	Captain Swagger	Sue	
1929	It Can Be Done	Anne Rogers	
1929	Girls Gone Wild	Babs Holworthy	Lost film
1929	Fox Movietone Follies of 1929		Alternative titles: Movietone Follies of 1929; The William Fox Movietone Follies of 1929; Lost film
1929	The Exalted Flapper	Princess Izola	
1929	Chasing Through Europe	Linda Terry	
1929	Why Leave Home?	Mary	Lost film
1930	The Lone Star Ranger	Mary Aldridge	
1930	The Big Party	Flo Jenkins	
1930	The Golden Calf	Marybelle Cobb	Alternative title: Her Golden Calf
1930	Dancing Sweeties	Molly O'Neil	
1930	She's My Weakness	Miss Marie Thurber	
1930	Check and Double Check	Jean Blair	
1931	Graft	Constance Hall	
1931	In Line of Duty	Felice Duchene	
1933	Secret Sinners	Marjorie Dodd	
1933	Straightaway	Anna Reeves	
1937	A Doctor's Diary	Mrs. Mason	
