= Chasing Through Europe =

1929 film by David Butler

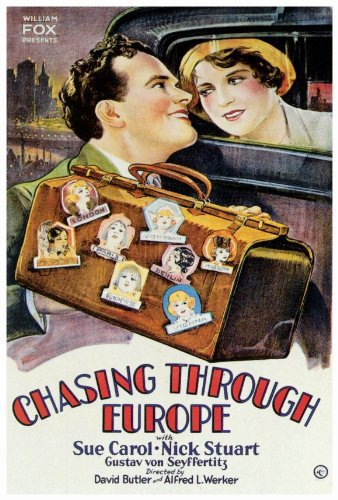
- Directed by: David Butler; Alfred L. Werker
- Written by: Andrew Bennison; John Stone
- Produced by: William Fox
- Starring: Sue Carol; Nick Stuart; Gustav von Seyffertitz
- Cinematography: Lucien N. Andriot; L. William O'Connell; Sidney Wagner
- Music by: Arthur Kay (uncredited)
- Production company: Fox Film Corporation
- Distributed by: Fox Film Corporation
- Release date: August 4, 1929
- Running time: 62 minutes
- Country: United States
- Language: Sound (Synchronized) (English Intertitles)

Chasing Through Europe is a lost 1929 American synchronized sound Pre-Code romance film directed by David Butler and Alfred L. Werker and starring Sue Carol, Nick Stuart and Gustav von Seyffertitz. While the film has no audible dialog, it was released with a synchronized musical score with sound effects using the sound-on-film Movietone process. The film was produced by the Fox Film Corporation. Most of the film was shot on location in Europe. This film was the last "synchronized score" film by Fox.

== Synopsis ==
Dick Stallings, a newsreel reporter in London, falls in love with Linda Terry a wealthy American woman. Together they travel round Europe interviewing leading politicians and celebrities, while being pursued by a gangster who plans to kidnap Linda.

== Cast ==
- Sue Carol as Linda Terry
- Nick Stuart as Dick Stallings
- Gustav von Seyffertitz as Phineas Merrill
- Gavin Gordon as Don Merrill
- E. Alyn Warren as Louise Herriot

== See also ==
- List of early sound feature films (1926–1929)

== Bibliography ==
- Solomon, Aubrey. The Fox Film Corporation, 1915-1935. A History and Filmography. McFarland & Co, 2011. ISBN 978-0786462865
