= Raymond Hackett =

American actor (1902-1958)

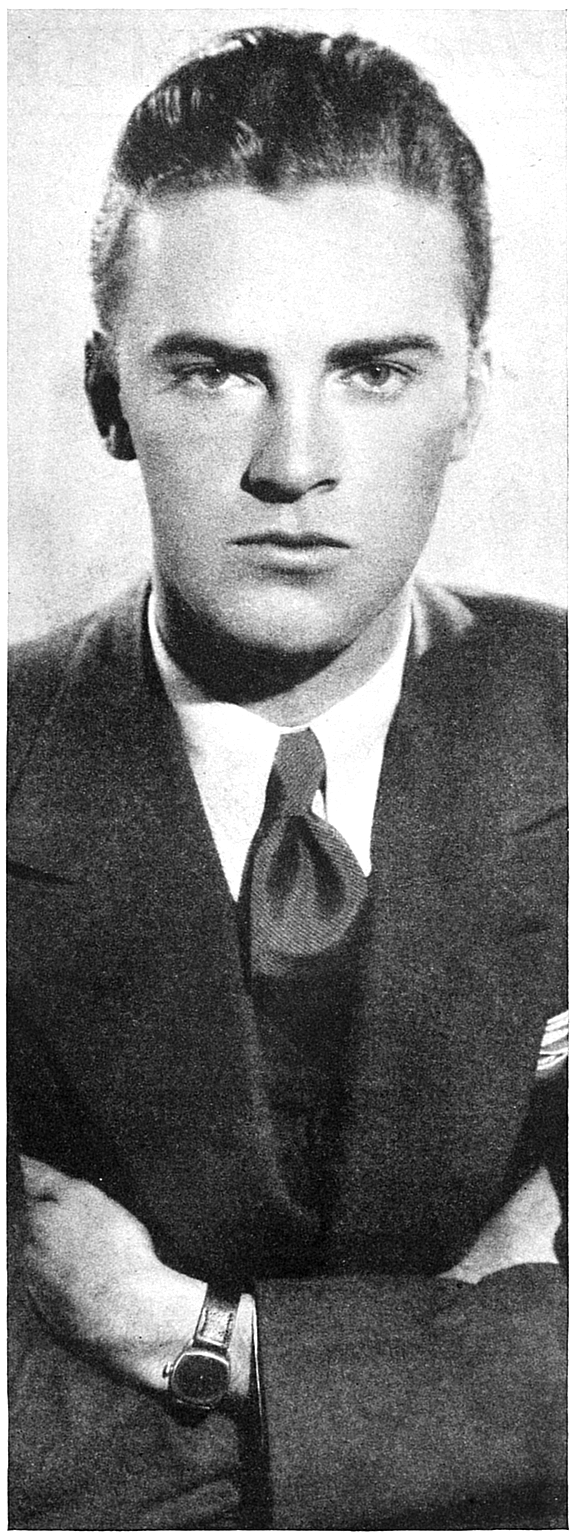
- Hackett in 1929
- Born: July 15, 1902; New York City, U.S.
- Died: July 7, 1958 (aged 55); Hollywood, California, U.S.
- Resting place: Chapel Of The Pines Crematory
- Other name: Master Raymond Hackett
- Occupation: actor
- Years active: 1912-1931 (film)
- Spouse(s): Myra Hampton (m. 1927; div. 1935) Blanche Sweet (m. 1935)

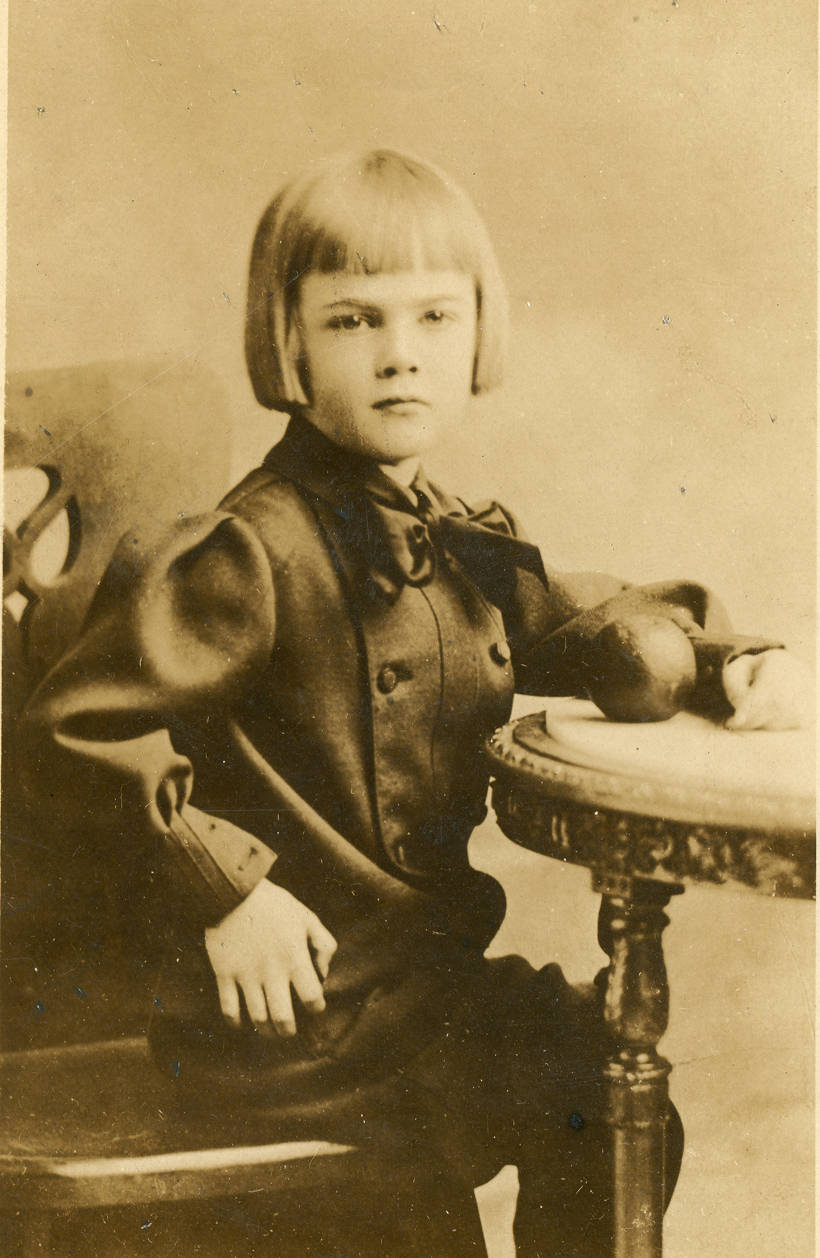
Hackett as a juvenile performer, 1909, in the Broadway play ''The Awakening of Helena Richie''.

Raymond Hackett (July 15, 1902 – July 7, 1958) was an American stage and screen actor. He had been a child actor on the Broadway stage and was the brother of Albert Hackett. He was born in New York City the son of Maurice Hackett and Florence Hackett (née Hart). His mother was later a silent screen actress. Hackett's first wife was Myra Hampton, the marriage was dissolved. His second wife was the actress Blanche Sweet.

As a child he first appeared on stage in New York in 1907 in The Toymaker of Nuremberg; Nov. 25, 1907 Garrick Theatre. In Sept. 1909 he appeared with Margaret Anglin in the play The Awakening of Helena Richie. In early silent films was called Master Raymond Hackett and appeared with his brother Albert in several shorts and one 1921 feature film The Country Flapper co-starring Dorothy Gish and Glenn Hunter. Had a major adult Broadway success in The Cradle Snatchers 1925 with Mary Boland and Humphrey Bogart. Hackett was popular in early sound films but his movie career ceased about 1931.

== Filmography ==
Year	Title	Role	Notes
1912	Little Boy Blue	Harold	Short; Lost film
1914	The Shadow of Tragedy	Robert Sterling	Short; Lost film
1915	The Ringtailed Rhinoceros	Billie Loring / The Prince	Lost film
1918	The Cruise of the Make-Believes	Daniel Meggison	Lost film
1919	Ginger	Tim Mooney	Lost film
1922	The Country Flapper	Shipp Jumpp	
1927	The Love of Sunya	Kenneth Ashling	
1928	Faithless Lover	Harry Ayres	Lost film
1929	The Trial of Mary Dugan	Jimmy Dugan	
1929	Madame X	Raymond Floriot	
1929	The Girl in the Show	Mal Thorne	
1929	Footlights and Fools	Jimmy Willet	Lost film
1930	Not So Dumb	Bill	
1930	Numbered Men	31857	
1930	Let Us Be Gay	Bruce Keene	
1930	Our Blushing Brides	David Jardine	
1930	On Your Back	Harvey	
1930	The Sea Wolf	Allen Rand	
1930	The Cat Creeps	Paul	Lost film
1931	Seed	Junior Carter	(final film role)
