= The Shepherd of the Hills =

The Shepherd of the Hills may refer to:

- The Shepherd of the Hills (novel), 1907 American novel by Harold Bell Wright
  - The Shepherd of the Hills (1919 film), silent version co-directed by Harold Bell Wright
  - The Shepherd of the Hills (1928 film), silent version directed by Albert S. Rogell
  - The Shepherd of the Hills (1941 film), Technicolor version, starring John Wayne
  - The Shepherd of the Hills (1964 film), color version, a/k/a Thunder Mountain
