= Opposition to World War II =

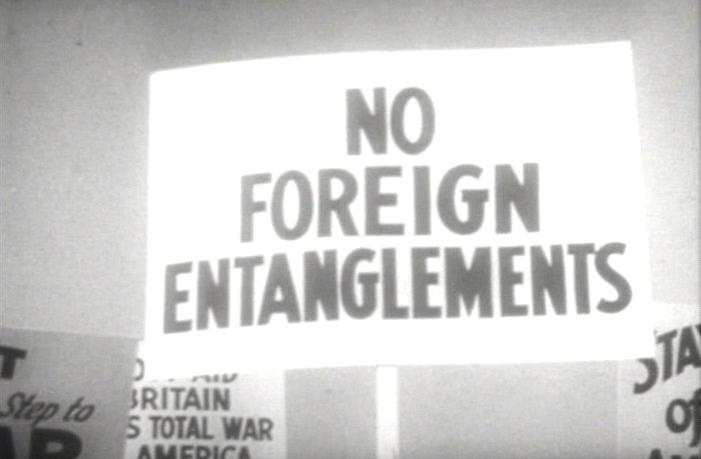
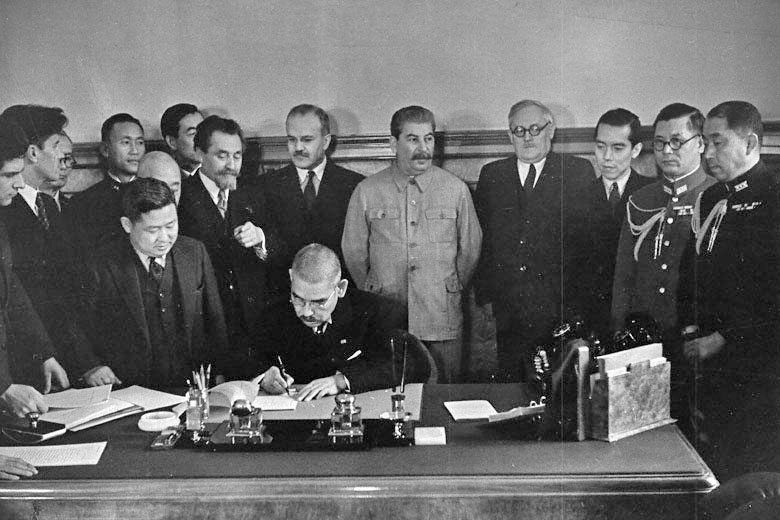
Clockwise from top: Protest march to prevent American involvement in World War II, Meeting at Hendaye between Franco and Hitler in October 1940, signing of the Soviet–Japanese Neutrality Pact April 1941

Opposition to World War II was expressed by the governments and peoples of all combatant nations to various extents. Initial reluctance for conflict in the Allied democratic nations changed to overwhelming, but not complete, support once the war had been joined. Some politicians and military leaders in the Axis powers opposed starting or expanding the conflict during its course. However, the totalitarian nature of these countries limited their effect. Noncombatant nations opposed joining the war for a variety of reasons, including self preservation, economic disincentives or a belief in neutrality in upon itself. After the war the populations of the former Axis powers mostly regretted their nations' involvement. In contrast, the people of Allied nations celebrated their involvement and the perceived just nature of the war, particularly in comparison with World War I.

== Background ==
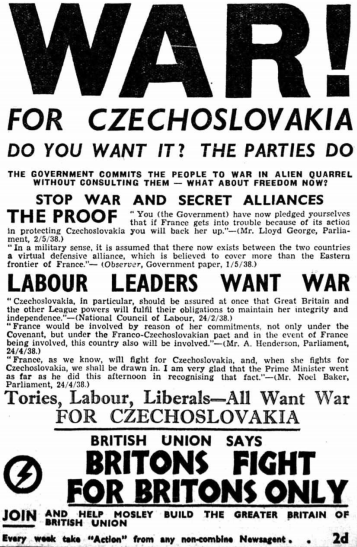
British Union of Fascists' advertisement in Action (1938), opposing Britain's entry into the Second World War

Following World War I the League of Nations was formed in the hope that diplomacy and a united international community of nations could prevent another global war. However, the League and the appeasement of aggressive nations during the invasions of Manchuria, Ethiopia and the annexation of Czechoslovakia was largely considered ineffective. Opposition to these invasions sometimes also came from politicians within the aggressor nations such as Japanese Minister Kijūrō Shidehara. A school of historical thought held the appeasement precipitated a wider war by emboldening aggressive nations.

== Invasion of Poland and Phoney War ==
=== German anti-war sentiment ===
Opposition to what would become World War II reached its height in the German military with the Oster conspiracy, a plot to remove Hitler from power should the pressure placed on Czechoslovakia lead to war. No similar plans are known for the invasion of Poland.

=== Polish anti-war sentiment ===
The public sentiment of interwar Poland was dominated by the idea that their nation was formed through war and could only be maintained by a willingness for future wars. Diplomatic negotiations were pursued with Germany, but fear of compromise leading to a slow loss of sovereignty, as with Czechoslovakia, led Polish leaders to put their faith in a British and French military alliance.

=== British and commonwealth anti-war sentiment ===
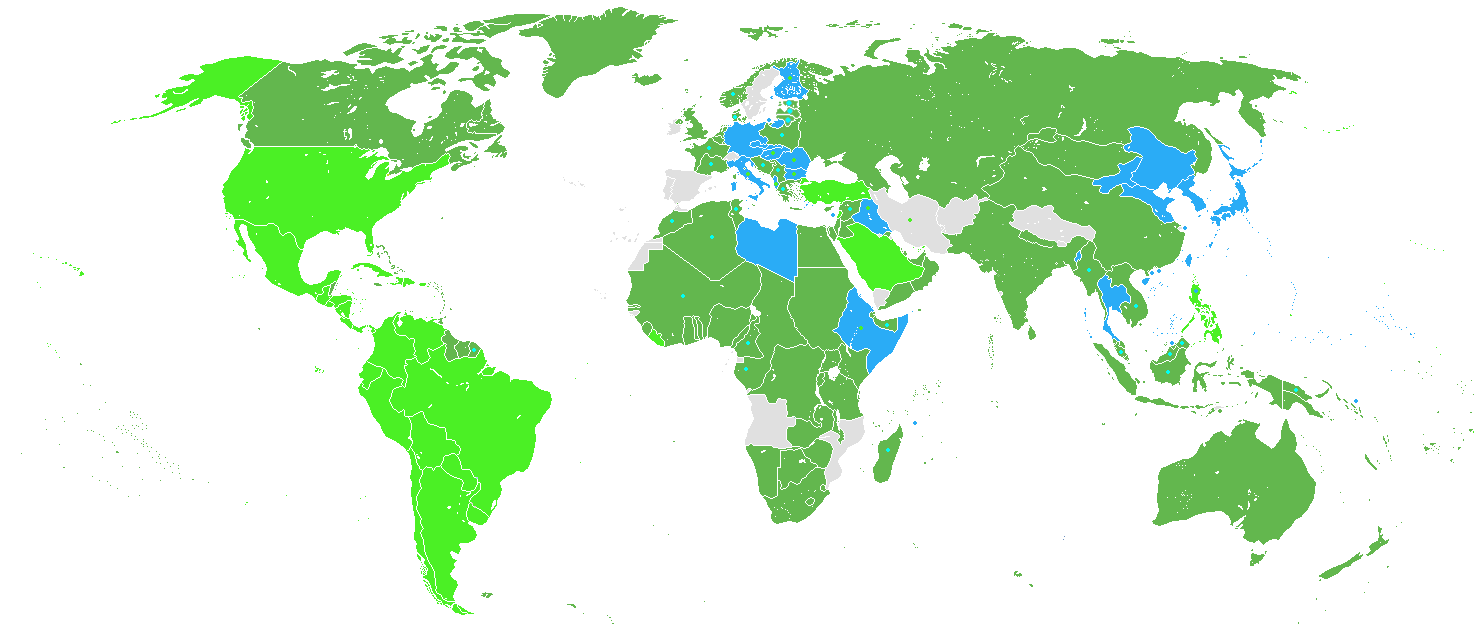
Allies Allies after the attack on Pearl Harbor Axis powers Neutral countries

Throughout the British Empire pacifists were jailed for expressing antiwar sentiment. Also Oswald Mosley and his British Union of Fascists were opposed to war, believing that another world war against Germany was not in Britain's national interest and that Britons should "fight for Britain alone". Editorials and cartoons in Action often asserted that the British Empire needed to prepare for a defensive war against Japan and that war with Germany would put Britain's interests in Asia in jeopardy. Mosley devoted all of the party's efforts to the "Peace Campaign", calling for a referendum on the continuation of the war and advocating a negotiated peace treaty with Germany. The campaign ended after Mosley and many other senior BUF members were interned under Defence Regulation 18B in May 1940.

Socialists in Britain were divided in the 1930s. There was a strong element of pacifism in the socialist movement, for example in Britain's Independent Labour Party. The commitment to pacifism, however, was balanced by militant anti-fascism. During its Popular Front period, the Comintern allied with other anti-fascist parties, including right-wing parties. This policy was terminated by the Comintern when the Soviet Union signed a non-aggression pact with Adolf Hitler in August 1939.

In British India, independence leader Mahatma Gandhi led the Quit India Movement in order to obstruct any efforts to support the British in the war and to demand complete independence of India from the British rule.

=== Isolationism in the United States ===
==== Public opinion ====
In a Gallup poll conducted in the first days of the war (between September 1 and September 6, 1939), Americans were asked if the US should "declare war on Germany in support of England, France and Poland and should deploy forces to assist those countries." with 90% of respondents saying no and 8% saying yes. In a separate question from the poll, respondents were asked what level of assistance should be given to the British, Polish and French. When asked about selling food, 74% agreed while 27% disagreed; for sending airplanes "and other war materials" to the United Kingdom and France 58% would agree with 42% disagreeing; when asked if army and naval forces should be deployed "abroad" to fight Germany 16% said yes with 84% saying no.

During the stalemated "Phoney War" (October 1939 to spring 1940), public opinion in the US was strongly opposed to entering the war. A poll in March 1940 found that 96 percent of Americans were against going to war with Germany. A September 1940 poll from Fortune Magazine found that 40% of "business leaders" were in favor of appeasing Japan while less than 20% supported an embargo or threatening force toward Japan.

==== Opposition elements ====
The Communist Party opposed American involvement in the early stages of World War II, starting in August 1939, when the Molotov–Ribbentrop Pact launched a deal between Stalin and Hitler that allowed Moscow to split control of Eastern Europe with Berlin. Communist activists in CIO labor unions tried to slow the flow of munitions to Britain. Leftist organizations like the American Peace Mobilization and veterans of the Abraham Lincoln Brigade protested in opposition to the war, the draft, and the Lend-Lease Act. They said of Lend-Lease, "Roosevelt needs its dictatorial powers to further his aim of carving out of a warring world, the American Empire so long desired by the Wall Street money lords." Overnight on June 22, 1941, the date of the German invasion of the Soviet Union in Operation Barbarossa, the Communists reversed positions and became war hawks.

Numerous women activists, notably within the Mothers' movement led by Elizabeth Dilling, opposed American involvement on the basis that it would be preferable for Nazism rather than Communism to dominate Europe. These women also wished to keep their own sons out of the combat US involvement in the war would necessitate, and believed the war would destroy Christianity and further spread atheistic Communism across Europe.

Henry Ford, a long-time pacifist, opposed US participation in the war until the attack on Pearl Harbor. Before then he refused to manufacture airplanes and other war equipment for the British. Father Charles Coughlin urged the US to keep out of the war and permit Germany to conquer Great Britain and the Soviet Union. Asked Coughlin, "Must the entire world go to war for 600,000 Jews in Germany?" The most radical of isolationists would say that all of the current problems in the US were because of World War I. US Senator Gerald Nye from North Dakota would even blame the Great Depression on America's economic expansion during World War I.

Isolationism was strongest in the United States, where oceans separated it on both sides from the war fronts. The German-American Bund even marched down the avenues of New York City demanding isolationism. The isolationists, led by the America First Committee, were a large, vocal, and powerful challenge to President Roosevelt's efforts to enter the war. Charles Lindbergh was perhaps the most famous isolationist. Isolationism was strongest in the Midwest with its strong German-American population.

Students at UC Berkeley in 1940 led a large protest in opposition to the war. The Keep America Out of War Congress (originally known as the Keep America Out of War Committee) or KAOWC from its founding on March 6, 1938, until when the America First Committee formed in the fall of 1940 was the only nationwide organization to oppose any foreign intervention and President Roosevelt's foreign policy. The KAOWC was for most of its lifetime composed of 6 pacifist groups apart from the Socialist Party of America: The Peace Section of the American Friends Service Committee (ALSC), Fellowship for Reconciliation (FOR), World Peace Commission of the Methodist Church, American Section of the Women's International League for Peace and Freedom (WIL), National Council for the Prevention of War (NCPW) and the War Resisters League (WRL). After the Attack on Pearl Harbor, the KAOWC would end up dissolving. The KAOWC drew primarily liberals and socialists while conservatives on the other hand were drawn to the No Foreign War Committee.

The Committee on Pacific Relations was a pro-Japanese isolationist organization created in 1941 by a conservative activist and politician from Missouri named Orland K. Armstrong which was tiny in comparison to the America First Committee. Members of the organization beliefs ranged from being simply against having a war between the United States and Japan to those who were strongly pro-Japanese. However, the war broke out before a planned conference they were going to have in Washington to create a more permanent organization and it began to fall apart when its acting chairman resigned in late November 1941. A Japanese diplomat named Terasaki Hidenari would be sent to the United States in an attempt to stir up isolationists and pacifists to prevent the country from entering the war.

With the Pearl Harbor attack in December 1941, nearly all the noninterventionist elements quickly switched to support the war.

=== Soviet and Communist anti-war sentiment ===
The Communist front organizations opposed the war during the period of the Nazi-Soviet pact. Most dutifully followed orders from Moscow. In 1940, Britain's Daily Worker referred to the Allied war effort as "the Anglo-French imperialist war machine." At the same time, Joseph Stalin ordered a series of military attacks on Poland, Finland, Estonia, Latvia, Lithuania, and Romania. He used communist parties and front groups to oppose the war and military preparations to prepare for the war in other countries so the Allies (Britain and France) were less able to resist aggression and to keep the US out of the war.

== The fall of France ==
France's quick defeat by Germany led to an increase in war opposition among the Allies. It also galvanized war support and confidence in the Axis powers. Many French politicians encouraged Britain to negotiate an end to the war. Rudolf Hess, a high ranking Nazi politician, traveled to Scotland in May 1941 in an attempt to start peace negotiations. The attempt was not taken seriously by the British. His full motives are unclear, however, he had no intention of opposing the upcoming invasion of Russia by Germany, however his success would have brought a temporary end to the war.

== Invasion of the Soviet Union ==
Communist parties around the world reversed course when Germany invaded the Soviet Union on June 22, 1941, and then advocated that material support be extended to the Soviets.

A small number of socialists (but very few Comintern members, who obeyed Moscow) continued to oppose the war. Leon Trotsky had drawn up the Proletarian Military Policy, calling for opposition to the war and support for industrial action during it.

Some communist-led organizations with links to the Comintern opposed the war during the period of the Hitler-Stalin pact but then backed it after Germany invaded the Soviet Union. However, the most popular communist organization in the US at the time, the Communist Party of the USA, firmly maintained an anti-fascist outlook on intervention throughout WWII, basing their policies on the need for a Popular Front against fascism.

== Japanese Pacific attacks ==
In Japan, while the majority of the population supported the increased militarism and governmental policies, a minority did exist. Wataru Kaji would help create the Japanese People's Anti-war Alliance, an antiwar organization in China after he had served his sentence for violating the Peace Preservation Law and go on to help the Nationalist government fight the Japanese. Kaji managed to persuade the Nationalist government into building a detention facility in July 1939 and selected 11 captured men from there to do subversive activities with the effect of provoking antiwar attitudes with these soldiers travelling to the battlefield speaking with a megaphone urging them to stop fighting. Similar activities were done by Japanese, Chinese and Korean communists as well.

=== Japanese reluctance for a wider war ===
The secrecy of the Japanese attacks on British and American colonies in the Pacific region and the lack of a free media has reduced the ability to determine the nature of their war opposition. Admiral Yamamoto was part of a military faction that argued against attacking America in particular, however, once war was decided upon he was a key contributor.

=== Public opinion in the United States of America ===
In the United States, over 125 African-Americans were imprisoned for resisting the draft or sedition, including Elijah Muhammad. Many of them were associated with the Pacific Movement of the Eastern World or the Nation of Islam and viewed the Japanese as the champions of the non-white people of the world.

=== Public opinion in British Colonies and Empire ===
A few nationalist movements in colonial countries would take no part in the conflict, which they saw as one of the colonialists' making. This was perhaps strongest in India, where some nationalists went beyond opposition to the war to form the Indian National Army and fight alongside Japanese forces. Opposition was also seen among the Ceylonese garrison on the Cocos Islands which mutinied, in part due to the influence of the Trotskyist Lanka Sama Samaja Party.

=== Late war sentiments ===
At the Yalta Conference in February 1945 the Allies agreed that only unconditional surrender would be accepted from the Axis powers. This reduced the options open to those who opposed a continuation of the war. This was particularly true for the Japanese who sought to negotiate a conditional surrender with the Allies in 1945.

== Post war attitudes ==
The post war view in Allied nations was that it was necessary and noble, with it being referred to informally as the 'good war' or Great Patriotic War. Within the defeated former Axis powers the war has been represented as a national shame leading to Japanese pacifism and German subdued nationalism. In the less significant Axis countries of Italy and Hungary, the war is viewed negatively and the extent to which they were victims or perpetrators of the war is debated.

== Notable pacifist organizations of World War II ==
- American Peace Mobilization
- Bruderhof
- Catholic Worker Movement
- Peace Pledge Union

== Notable pacifists of World War II ==
- Aldous Huxley – British author
- Ammon Hennacy – American activist
- André and Magda Trocmé – French pastor
- Archibald Baxter – New Zealand farmer
- Carl von Ossietzky – German journalist
- Dorothy Day – American journalist
- Franz Jägerstätter – Austrian miner
- Jeannette Rankin – American politician and women's rights advocate
- Olaf Kullmann – Norwegian naval officer
- Ormond Burton – New Zealand soldier
- Sybil Thorndike – British actress
- Vera Brittain – British nurse
- Kurt Vonnegut – American author

== See also ==
- List of peace activists
- List of anti-war organizations
- Opposition to World War I
