= The Shepherd of the Hills (1964 film) =

1964 film

- Directed by: Ben Parker
- Written by: Ben Parker
- Based on: The Shepherd of the Hills; 1907 novel by Harold Bell Wright
- Produced by: Jim McCullough Sr.
- Starring: Richard Arlen; James Middleton; Sherry Lynn
- Cinematography: Ted Saizis; Vincent Saizis
- Edited by: Marcell Greco
- Music by: Marlin Skiles
- Color process: Eastmancolor
- Production company: Macco Productions
- Distributed by: Howco International Pictures
- Release date: April 14, 1964
- Running time: 110 minutes
- Country: United States
- Language: English

The Shepherd of the Hills is a 1964 American Western film directed by Ben Parker and starring Richard Arlen, James Middleton and Sherry Lynn. It is based on Harold Bell Wright's 1907 novel The Shepherd of the Hills. The story was filmed previously in the silent era by author Wright himself in 1919, released on State Rights basis. It was filmed again, in 1928, starring Molly O'Day at First National Pictures. Again remade as 1941, also color version starring John Wayne.

== Plot summary ==
Set in the remote Missouri Ozark Mountains during the early 1900s, the story follows Daniel Howitt (James Middleton), a mysterious stranger who arrives in the backwoods community seeking redemption for a troubled past. The locals, suspicious of outsiders, initially regard him with distrust and hostility. Howitt takes refuge in an abandoned cabin high in the hills, where he begins tending sheep and gradually becomes known as "The Shepherd."

The mountain community is led by the strong-willed Old Matt (Richard Arlen), a respected patriarch whose family has deep roots in the region. His son, Young Matt (Hal Meadows), is torn between his loyalty to the mountain ways and his growing attraction to Sammy Lane (Sherry Lynn), a spirited young woman who represents hope for a different kind of life.

As Howitt integrates himself into the community through acts of kindness and wisdom, he begins to heal old wounds and bring peace to feuding families. However, his past eventually catches up with him when it's revealed that he was once involved in a tragic incident that affected the local community. The revelation threatens to destroy the trust and friendships he has carefully built.

The story builds to a climactic confrontation where Howitt must face the consequences of his past actions while the community must decide whether to embrace forgiveness and redemption or cling to old grievances. Through sacrifice and moral courage, the shepherd figure ultimately brings healing and transformation to the mountain people, fulfilling his role as a Christ-like figure who offers hope and renewal to an isolated community struggling with poverty, violence, and despair.

== Cast ==
- Richard Arlen as Old Matt
- James Middleton as Daniel Howitt
- Sherry Lynn as Sammy Lane
- James Collie as Wash Gibbs
- Lloyd Durre as Doc Coughlan
- Hal Meadows as Young Matt
- James Bradford as The Sheriff
- Joy N. Houck Jr. as Ollie Stewart
- Gilbert Elmore as Jess Lane
- George Jackson as Jed Holland
- Delores James as Aunt Mollie
- Danny Spurlock as Pete
- Reubin Egan as Howard
- Tom Pope as Baldknobber
- Roy Idom as Baldknobber
- Jim Teague as Baldknobber
- Roger Nash as Baldknobber
- Jim Greene as Baldknobber
- Jerry-Mac Johnston as Clint

== Bibliography ==
- Rowan, Terry. The American Western A Complete Film Guide. 2013.
