= Eyes of the World =

The Eyes of the World or Eyes of the World may refer to:

== Film ==
- The Eyes of the World, 1917 American silent drama co-starring Jack Livingston, based on Harold Bell Wright's 1914 novel
- The Eyes of the World (1920 film), German silent starring Conrad Veidt
- The Eyes of the World (1930 film), American sound version of Harold Bell Wright's 1914 novel

== Literature ==
- The Eyes of the World (novel), 1914 American novel by Harold Bell Wright

== Music ==
- "Eyes of the World" (Fleetwood Mac song), from their 1982 album Mirage
- "Eyes of the World" (Grateful Dead song), from their 1973 album Wake of the Flood
- Eyes of the World (album), 1990 album by MacAlpine
- "Eyes of the World", song by Rainbow from their 1979 album Down to Earth
- "Eyes of the World", song by Stratovarius on their 1994 album Dreamspace
- "Eyes of the World", song by Freedom Call from their 2003 album Eternity
- "Eyes of the World", song by Dark Tranquillity from their 2020 album Moment
- Eyes of the World, 2025 album by Valerio Cosi

== See also ==
- The Eye of the World, 1990 science fiction–fantasy novel by Robert Jordan
