= Levi Morrill Post Office and Homestead =

- Levi Morrill Post
- U.S. National Register of Historic Places
- Location within Missouri Location within the United States
- Location: Southeast of Reeds Spring, at Notch, Missouri, near Reeds Spring, Missouri
- Coordinates: 36°40′32″N 93°20′13″W
- Area: 0.5 acres (0.20 ha)
- Built: 1893
- NRHP reference No.: 79001397
- Added to NRHP: April 3, 1979

Levi Morrill Post Office and Homestead, also known as Uncle Ike's Post Office, is a historic post office located at Notch, Stone County, Missouri. The property includes five contributing buildings dated between 1893 and 1926. They are the Notch, Missouri ("Uncle Ike's") Post Office, the Levi Morrill homestead, a well house, smokehouse and privy. The post office is a one-story, rectangular, gable roofed frame building. It was the model for Uncle Ike's Post Office in Harold Bell Wright's novel The Shepherd of the Hills.

It was listed on the National Register of Historic Places in 1979.
