= Hell Harbor =

1930 film

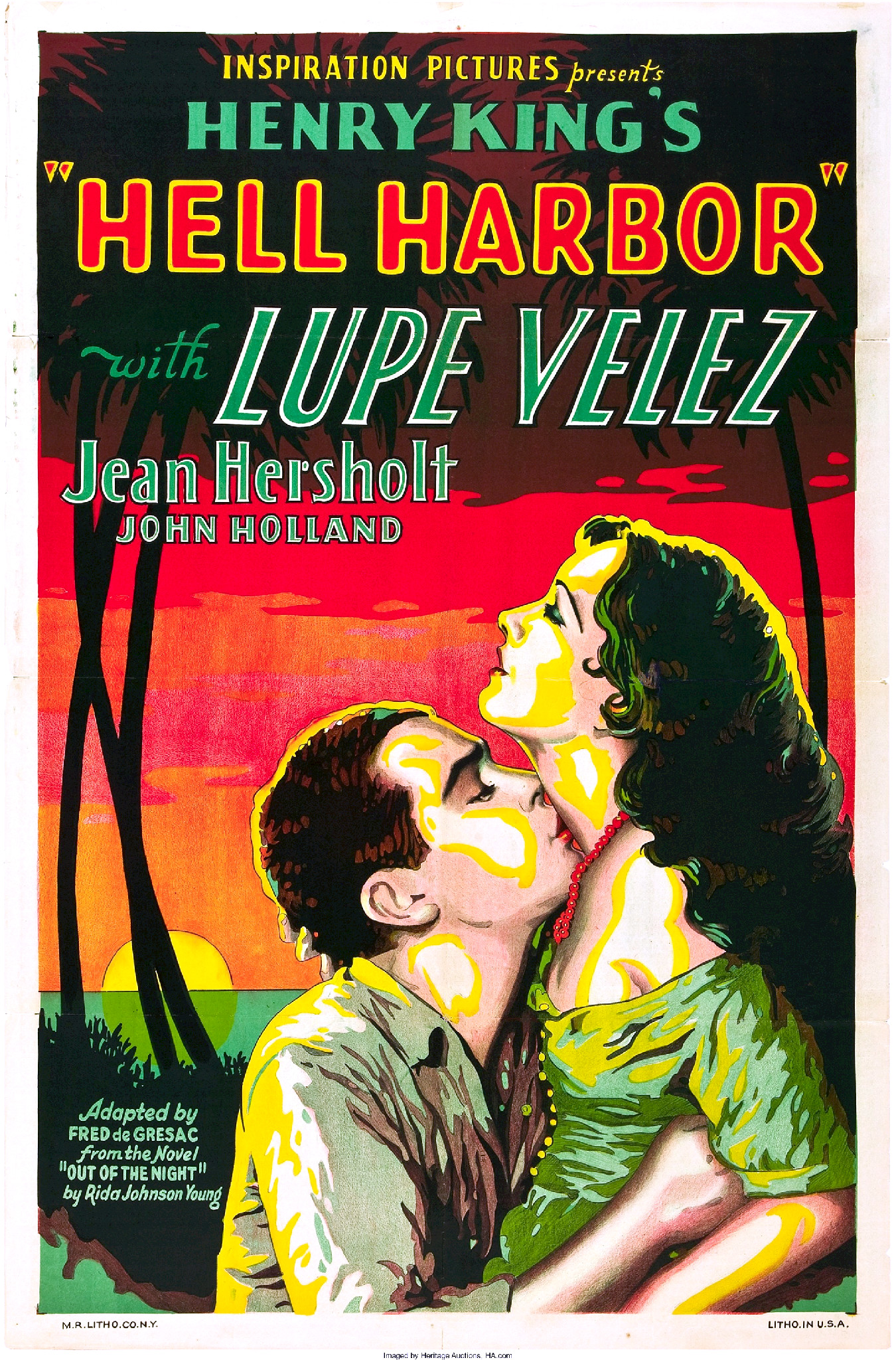
- Theatrical release poster
- Directed by: Henry King
- Screenplay by: Fred de Gresac; Clarke Silvernail; Brewster Morse
- Based on: Out of the Night; 1925 novel by Rida Johnson Young
- Produced by: Henry King
- Starring: Lupe Vélez; Jean Hersholt; John Holland; Gibson Gowland; Harry Allen; Al St. John
- Cinematography: John P. Fulton; Robert M. Haas; Mack Stengler
- Edited by: Lloyd Nosler
- Music by: Harvey Allen; Gene Berten; Sexteto Habanero; Ernesto Lecuona
- Production company: Inspiration Pictures
- Distributed by: United Artists
- Release date: March 15, 1930
- Running time: 93 minutes
- Country: United States
- Language: English

Hell Harbor is a 1930 American pre-Code drama film directed by Henry King and written by Fred de Gresac, Clarke Silvernail and Brewster Morse. The film stars Lupe Vélez, Jean Hersholt, John Holland, Gibson Gowland, Harry Allen and Al St. John. The film was released on March 15, 1930, by United Artists.

== Plot ==
Hell Harbor (1930)

Anita Morgan, a descendant of the famous pirate Henry Morgan, is living a carefree and careless life on an island in the Caribbean, but would much rather be living the same life In Havana. When she learns that her father, in exchange for money, has promised her hand in marriage to a Jewish moneylender, she is more convinced that Havana is the place to be. When an American comes to the island to buy some pearls, she falls in love with him. and when she discovers he is to be tricked out of his money and killed, she makes plans to save him...and go to Havana with him.

== Cast ==
- Lupe Vélez as Anita Morgan
- Jean Hersholt as Joseph Horngold
- John Holland as Bob Wade
- Gibson Gowland as Henry Morgan
- Harry Allen as Peg Leg
- Al St. John as Bunion
- Paul E. Burns as Blinky
- George Bookasta as Spotty
