= The Lady from Nowhere =

1931 film

- Directed by: Richard Thorpe
- Written by: Barney Gerard; Adrian Johnson
- Produced by: George R. Batcheller
- Starring: Alice Day; John Holland; Phillips Smalley
- Cinematography: M.A. Anderson
- Edited by: Richard Thorpe
- Production company: Chesterfield Pictures
- Distributed by: Chesterfield Pictures
- Release date: August 1, 1931
- Running time: 65 minutes
- Country: United States
- Language: English

The Lady from Nowhere is a 1931 American crime film directed by Richard Thorpe and starring Alice Day, John Holland and Phillips Smalley.

== Plot ==
A young couple pose as criminals in order to get the goods on their crooked bosses.

== Cast ==
- Alice Day as Marian
- John Holland as John Conroy
- Phillips Smalley as Barstow
- Barbara Bedford as Mollie Carter
- Mischa Auer as Rigo
- James P. Burtis as Chief of Detectives
- Bernie Lamont
- Raymond Largay
- Lafe McKee as Henchman Snowden

== Bibliography ==
- Michael R. Pitts. Poverty Row Studios, 1929–1940: An Illustrated History of 55 Independent Film Companies, with a Filmography for Each. McFarland & Company, 2005.
