= The Eyes of the World (1930 film) =

1930 film

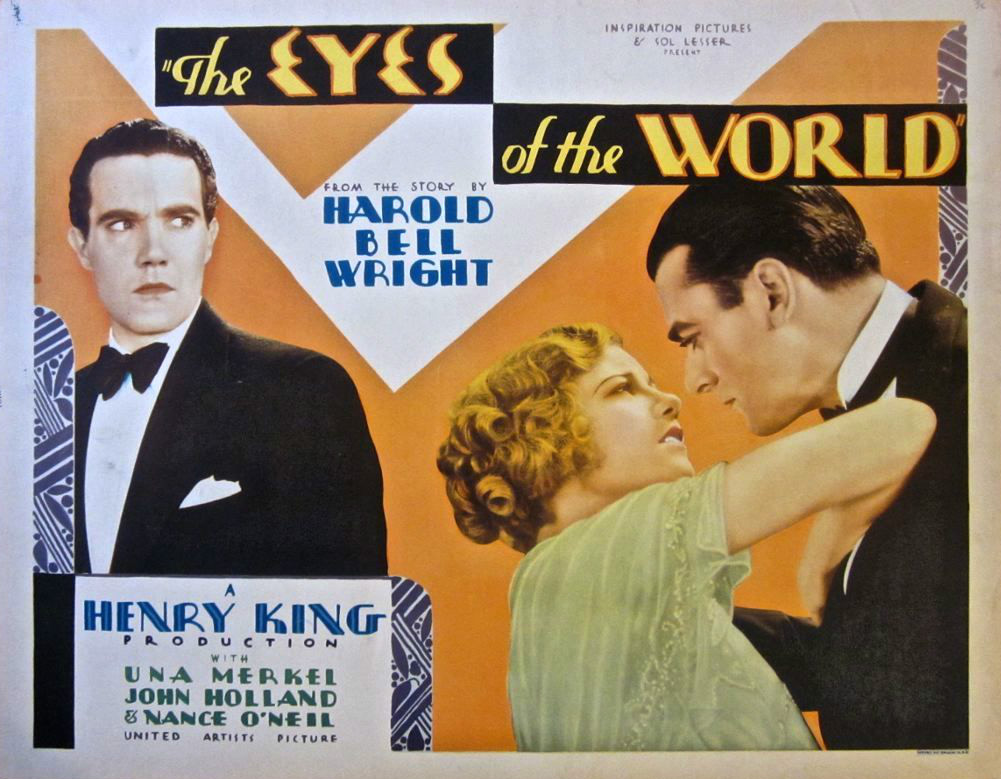
- Lobby card
- Directed by: Henry King
- Screenplay by: Brewster Morse; Clarke Silvernail
- Based on: The Eyes of the World by Harold Bell Wright
- Produced by: Sol Lesser
- Starring: Eulalie Jensen; Florence Roberts; Una Merkel; Nance O'Neil
- Cinematography: John P. Fulton; Ray June
- Edited by: Lloyd Nosler
- Production company: Inspiration Pictures
- Distributed by: United Artists
- Release date: August 30, 1930
- Running time: 80 minutes
- Country: United States
- Language: English

The Eyes of the World is a 1930 American pre-Code drama film directed by Henry King and written by Brewster Morse and Clarke Silvernail. It is an adaptation of Harold Bell Wright's 1914 novel. The film stars Eulalie Jensen, Florence Roberts, Una Merkel, and Nance O'Neil. The film was released on August 30, 1930, by United Artists.

There is also a previous silent-film adaptation of the same novel, which was released in 1917 and is considered lost.

== Cast ==
- Eulalie Jensen as Mrs. Rutledge
- Hugh Huntley as James Rutledge
- Myra Hubert as Myra
- Florence Roberts as The Maid
- Una Merkel as Sybil
- Nance O'Neil as Myra
- John Holland as Aaron King
- Fern Andra as Mrs. Taine
- Frederick Burt as Conrad La Grange
- Brandon Hurst as Mr. Taine
- William Jeffrey as Bryan Oakley
