= The Man from Death Valley =

1931 film

- Theatrical release poster
- Directed by: Lloyd Nosler
- Screenplay by: Lloyd Nosler; George Arthur Durlam
- Produced by: Trem Carr
- Starring: Tom Tyler
- Cinematography: Archie Stout
- Edited by: Arthur A. Brooks
- Production company: Monogram Pictures
- Distributed by: Monogram Pictures
- Release date: September 9, 1931
- Running time: 61 minutes
- Country: United States
- Language: English

The Man from Death Valley is a 1931 American Western film directed by Lloyd Nosler and written by Lloyd Nosler and George Arthur Durlam. The film stars Tom Tyler. The film was released on September 9, 1931, by Monogram Pictures.

== Cast ==
- Tom Tyler as Dave
- John Oscar as Hank
- Betty Mack as Ann
- Gino Corrado as Ortego
- Stanley Blystone as Sheriff Jeffries
- Si Jenks as Bank Teller
- Hank Bell as Deputy
