= George Bookasta =

American actor

- Born: July 14, 1917
- Died: March 26, 2014 (aged 96); Saratoga Springs, New York, United States
- Occupations: Film actor, director
- Years active: 1923–1949

George Bookasta (July 14, 1917 – March 26, 2014) was an American child actor and director who was discovered by Charlie Chaplin. He signed a contract with the film studio United Artists and debuted in the silent film Rosita in 1923. Some of his other films included The Night Bird, Hell Harbor and It Had to Happen. Bookasta was a stand-in in Sergeant York in 1941.

During World War II Bookasta was a radio operator in the Army. As an adult, he created the magazine TV Times, directed episodes for television shows such as The Colgate Comedy Hour and Bachelor Father, and led a big band orchestra in New York.

Bookasta directed summer stock theater with the Lighthouse Players in Ocean City, Maryland. He wrote, produced, and directed the one-woman show Dear Femininity, in which Annie Wiley enacted her "real-life journey as an emerging performer".

Bookasta died at his home in Saratoga Springs, New York on March 26, 2014, at the age of 96.
