= That Printer of Udell's =

1902 book by Harold Bell Wright

That printer of Udell's

That Printer of Udell's is a 1902 work of fiction by Harold Bell Wright.

Wright, who served as a minister before becoming a writer, created a story with Christian themes. In the story, Dick Falkner, who comes from a broken home, sees his father under the influence of alcohol and his mother starving. After his parents die, Dick goes to Boyd City in the Midwestern United States to become employed. Dick believes that "Christians won't let me starve." A printer named George Udell hires Dick; both of them decide to become Christians and Dick becomes a revered member of the religious community due to his public speaking abilities and optimism. At the end of the book, Dick gets a political job in Washington, D.C.

Ronald Reagan read the book at age 11 after his mother, a member of the Protestant Disciples of Christ Church, gave him the book. Reagan says that the book inspired him to become an evangelical Christian; he became baptized by his mother's congregation. At age 66, Reagan said that the book "left an abiding belief in the triumph of good over evil."
