= The Shepherd of the Hills (1941 film) =

1941 film

- Film poster
- Directed by: Henry Hathaway
- Screenplay by: Stuart Anthony; Grover Jones
- Based on: The Shepherd of the Hills; 1907 novel by Harold Bell Wright
- Produced by: Jack Moss
- Starring: John Wayne; Betty Field; Harry Carey; Beulah Bondi; James Barton; Samuel S. Hinds; Marjorie Main; Marc Lawrence
- Cinematography: W. Howard Greene; Charles Lang
- Edited by: Ellsworth Hoagland
- Music by: Gerard Carbonara
- Production company: Paramount Pictures
- Distributed by: Paramount Pictures
- Release date: July 18, 1941
- Running time: 98 minutes
- Country: United States
- Language: English

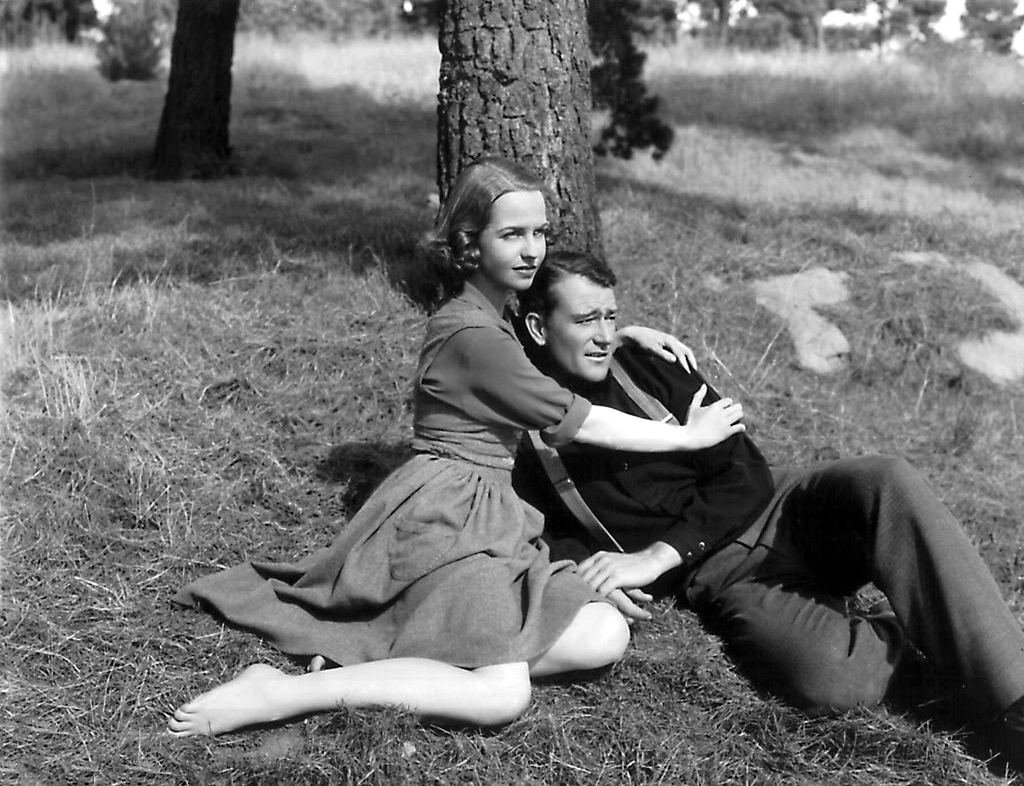
Betty Field and John Wayne

The Shepherd of the Hills is a 1941 American drama film starring John Wayne, Betty Field and Harry Carey. The supporting cast includes Beulah Bondi, Ward Bond, Marjorie Main and John Qualen. The picture was Wayne's first film in Technicolor and was based on the novel of the same name by Harold Bell Wright. The director was Henry Hathaway, who directed several other Wayne films including True Grit almost three decades later.

The story was filmed previously in the silent era by author Wright, in 1919, released on State Rights basis. It was filmed again in 1928, starring Molly O'Day at First National Pictures, and later, in colour in 1964.

The film also features two additional pieces of music that remain uncredited. The first is used as a leit motif to represent the spirit of Young Matt's deceased mother: the Wiegenlied ("Guten Abend, gut' Nacht" [1868]) of Johannes Brahms, commonly known in English as the Brahms Lullaby. The second uncredited composition was "There's a Happy Hunting Ground", words and music by Sam Coslow, sung by "Fuzzy" Knight, accompanied by an a cappella onscreen chorus in multi-voiced harmony; the song is sung again by the chorus alone over the closing credits.

== Plot ==
A family of moonshiners living in the Ozarks have a reckoning regarding their family curse.

Twenty-five years before, a young mother dies in childbirth, having been apparently abandoned by the baby's father. The surviving baby, "Young Matt" Matthews, is raised by Aunt Mollie to find and kill his father, whom Mollie holds responsible.

Meanwhile, an elderly, educated stranger called Daniel Howitt arrives from the city and buys a tract of land called Moanin' Meadow. Young Matt objects because this was his mother's land and it is where she is buried. It is also believed by the locals to be cursed and haunted.

Daniel Howitt helps his new neighbors and comes to be known as the shepherd of the hills for his good deeds. He and Young Matt become friends.

Young Matt's girl, Sammy, realizes from their resemblance that the shepherd is actually Young Matt's father. When it is revealed at a community gathering, Young Matt re-affirms his vow to kill his father.

Instead, the shepherd shoots first, gravely wounding Young Matt. The shepherd reveals that, twenty-five years before, he'd taken a man's life and paid for it in prison, which is why he was not there for Matt or his mother. He wanted to save Young Matt from the same fate, stating he'd rather see Matt dead than ruined by hatred.

Matt forgives the shepherd and proposes marriage to Sammy.

== Cast ==
- John Wayne as Young Matt
- Betty Field as Sammy Lane
- Harry Carey as Daniel Howitt
- Beulah Bondi as Aunt Mollie
- James Barton as Old Matt
- Samuel S. Hinds as Andy Beeler
- Marjorie Main as Granny Becky
- Ward Bond as Wash Gibbs
- Marc Lawrence as Pete
- John Qualen as Coot Royal
- Fuzzy Knight as Mr. Palestrom
- Tom Fadden as Jim Lane
- Olin Howland as Corky
- Dorothy Adams as Elvy
- Virita Campbell as Baby
- Selmer Jackson as Doctor (uncredited)

== Production ==
Filming took place in Big Bear Lake and Moon Ridge, California.

== Critical assessment ==
Literary critic Kingsley Canham reports that The Shepherd of the Hills is considered the best of the director's "mountain feud" films dealing with inter-family conflicts in rural settings. The movie is the first of Hathaway's six pictures to star John Wayne.

== Differences from the novel ==
Only a few plot elements and characters from the novel are used in the 1941 film, and those are depicted differently, so it is basically a different story.

While the novel interposed fiction with portrayals of actual persons residing in the Missouri Ozarks, in the early Branson area, the film departed markedly from the book's presentations. Old Matt, a patriarch, mill owner and influential person within the community, is presented in the film as a doddering fool, henpecked by his wife, Aunt Mollie. In the novel she's a nurturing, kindly, loyal wife and friend, but in this film she is a shrill, nasty moonshiner. The "Shepherd" of the title, a cultured, sympathetic visitor from Chicago who contributes positively to the society he's visiting, in this film is an aging ex-convict. In total odds with the book, he is here Young Matt's (John Wayne's) messianic father, with a shootout perpetrated by "Big John". Other characters differ as markedly from Wright's novel.

== See also ==
- John Wayne filmography

== Sources ==
- Canham, Kingsley. 1973. The Hollywood Professionals: Michael Curtiz, Raoul Walsh, Henry Hathaway, Volume 1. The Tanvity Press, A. S. Barnes Co., New York. ISBN 978-0900730580. Library of Congress Cat no. 72–1786.
