= Guilty? (1930 film) =

1930 film

- Film poster
- Directed by: George B. Seitz
- Written by: Dorothy Howell
- Produced by: Harry Cohn
- Starring: Virginia Valli and John Holland
- Cinematography: Ted Tetzlaff
- Edited by: Leon Barsha
- Distributed by: Columbia Pictures
- Release date: March 3, 1930
- Running time: 67 minutes
- Country: United States
- Language: English

Guilty? is a 1930 American pre-Code drama film directed by George B. Seitz.

== Cast ==
- Virginia Valli as Carolyn
- John Holland as Bob Lee
- John St. Polis as Polk
- Lydia Knott as Martha
- Erville Alderson as Lee
- Richard Carlyle as Dr. Bennett
- Clarence Muse as Jefferson
- Eddie Clayton as Jerry
- Robert T. Haines as Prosecuting Attorney
- Frank Fanning as Warden
- Edward Cecil as Judge
- Gertrude Howard as Lucy
