= Grief Street =

1931 film

- theatrical release poster
- Directed by: Richard Thorpe
- Story by: Arthur Hoerl (& continuity)
- Produced by: George R. Batcheller
- Starring: Barbara Kent; John Holland
- Cinematography: M.A. Anderson
- Production company: Chesterfield Motion Pictures Corporation
- Distributed by: Chesterfield Motion Pictures Corp.
- Release date: October 1, 1931 (US)
- Running time: 64 minutes
- Country: United States
- Language: English

Grief Street is a 1931 American pre-Code mystery crime film directed by Richard Thorpe and starring Barbara Kent and John Holland. It was produced and distributed by the Chesterfield Motion Pictures Corporation.

== Plot ==
A womanizing matinée idol is found strangled in his dressing room. The door is locked from the inside and there is no other way into the room. He had been having an affair with his leading lady, while his actress wife is doing the same with the stage manager. Everyone, including a young actress who had been fired from the play, and an old actor now relegated to a stage-doorman, has a motive. The explanation for the murder lies within the script of the play.

== Cast ==
- Barbara Kent as Jean Royce
- John Holland as Jim Ryan
- Dorothy Christy as Mrs. Alvin Merle aka Ethel Wynn
- Crauford Kent as Alvin Merle
- Lillian Rich as Pamela Gregory
- James P. Burtis as Police Sgt. Jardine
- Larry Steers as Ralph Burns
- Lloyd Whitlock as Frank Murray
- Lafe McKee as Michael - Stage Doorman
- Creighton Hale as Ted
- Raymond Largay as Police Capt. Blake
- Walter Brennan as Walt
