= John Holland (actor, born 1899) =

20th-century American actor

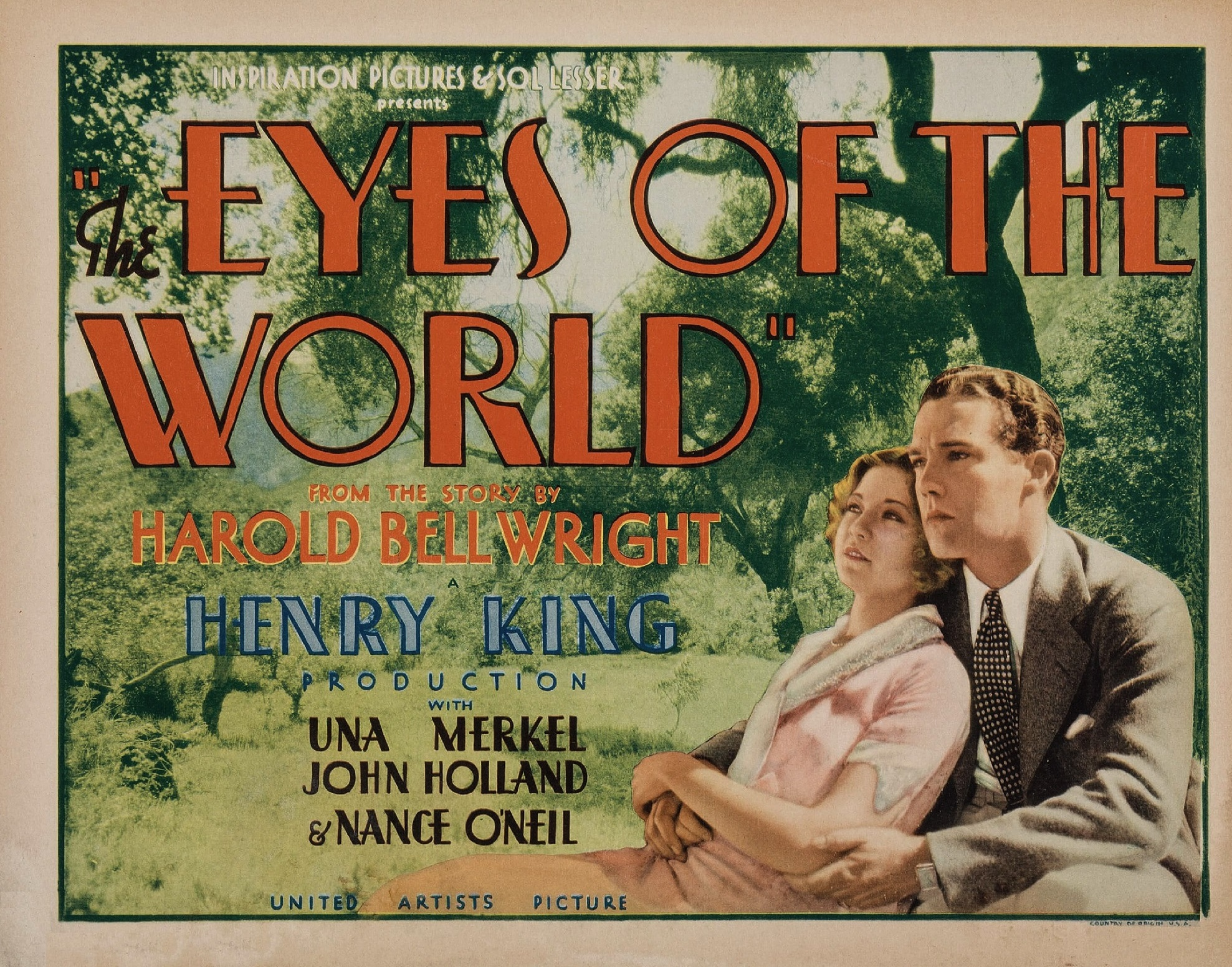
- Lobby card from The Eyes of the World (1930) with Una Merkel and John Holland
- Born: James B. Holland; June 11, 1899; Kenosha, Wisconsin, United States
- Died: September 2, 1971 (aged 72); Laguna Beach, California, United States
- Other name: Clifford Holland
- Occupation: Actor
- Years active: 1926–1932
- Notable credit(s): Hell Harbor, She Goes to War

John Holland (June 11, 1899 – September 2, 1971) was an American actor who started his career as the male lead in two 1927 silents, Rich But Honest and The Secret Studio, but the advent of sound brought him a mix of occasional male leads, second leads and parts further down the cast list.

== Biography ==
John Holland was born James B. Holland in Kenosha, Wisconsin. He began acting in Hollywood films in 1926, billed as Clifford Holland in his earliest appearances. He later ascribed this to a casting director confusing him with his cousin, civil engineer Clifford Milburn Holland. He was best known for roles in the Pre-Code dramas Hell Harbor and She Goes to War. Holland was 33 years old at the time of his final film performance in a 10th-billed supporting role in 1932's The Silver Lining. He died in Laguna Beach, California in 1971 at the age of 72.

== Filmography ==
- Summer Bachelors (1926) as Martin Cole
- Rich But Honest (1927) as Bob Hendricks
- The Secret Studio (1927) as Sloan Whitney
- She Goes to War (1929) as Tom Pike
- Black Magic (1929) as John Ormsby
- The College Coquette (1929) as Coach Harvey Porter
- Guilty? (1930) as Bob Lee
- Hell Harbor (1930) as Bob Wade
- Ladies Must Play (1930) as Geoffrey
- The Eyes of the World (1930) as Aaron King
- Ladies' Man (1931) as Peyton Walden
- Defenders of the Law (1931) as Police Captain Bill Houston
- The Lady from Nowhere (1931) as John Conroy
- Grief Street (1931) as Jim Ryan
- Morals for Women (1931) as Paul Cooper
- The Silver Lining (1932) as Tommy
