= She Goes to War =

1929 film

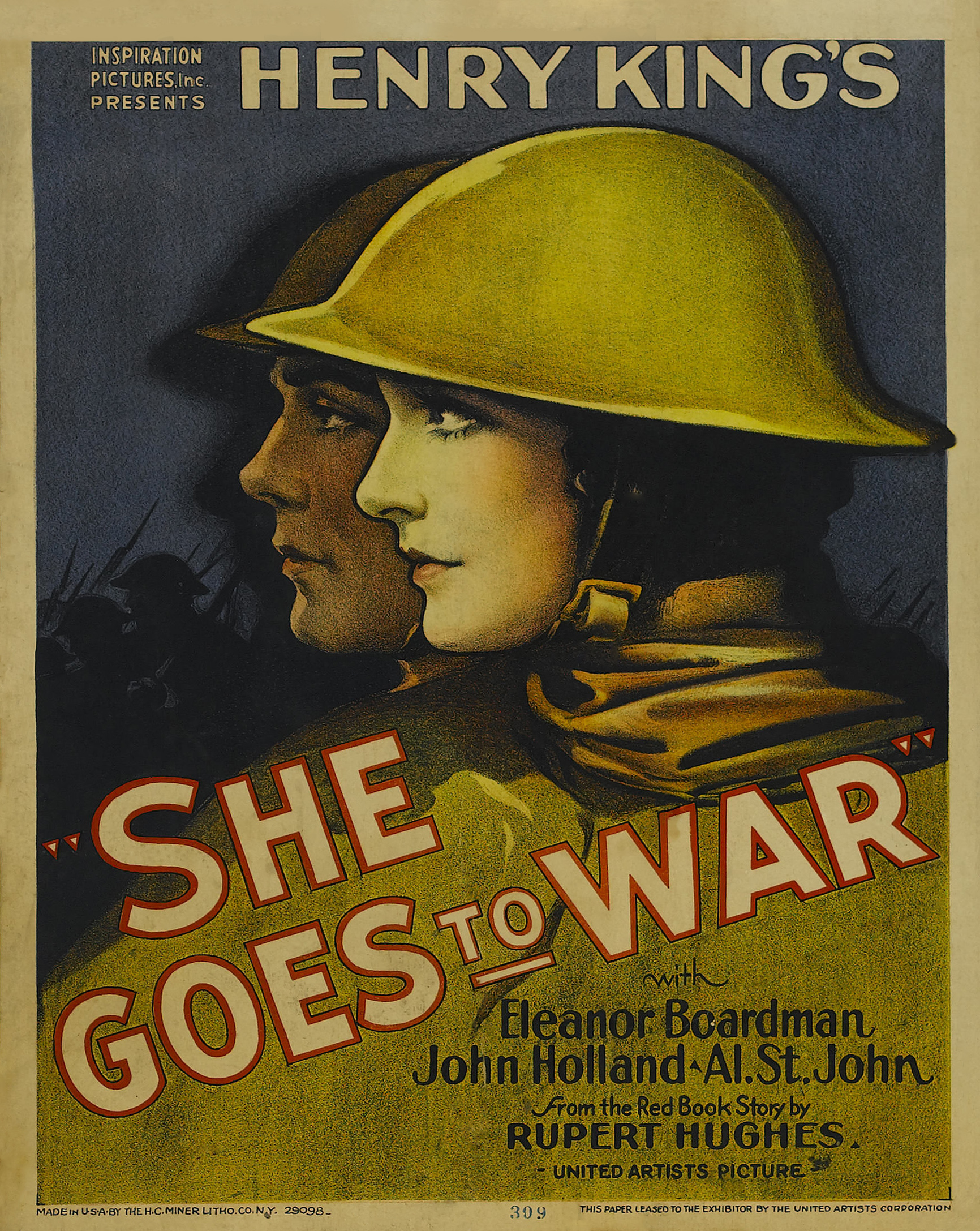
- Theatrical poster
- Directed by: Henry King
- Written by: Rupert Hughes; Fred De Gresac; Howard Estabrook; John Monk Saunders
- Produced by: Victor Halperin; Edward Halperin
- Starring: Eleanor Boardman; John Holland; Edmund Burns
- Cinematography: John P. Fulton; Tony Gaudio
- Edited by: Lloyd Nosler
- Production company: Inspiration Pictures
- Distributed by: United Artists
- Release date: June 8, 1929 (USA)
- Running time: 87 minutes
- Country: United States
- Languages: Sound (Part-Talkie); English intertitles

She Goes to War is a 1929 American sound part-talkie drama film directed by Henry King and starring Eleanor Boardman. In addition to sequences with audible dialogue or talking sequences, the film features a synchronized musical score and sound effects along with English intertitles. The soundtrack was recorded using the RCA Photophone sound-on-film system. The film was released a year after Boardman had starred in The Crowd. The extant version is incomplete.

== Plot ==
The surviving film.

== Cast ==
- Eleanor Boardman as Joan Morant
- John Holland as Tom Pike
- Margaret Seddon as Tom's mother
- Eulalie Jensen as matron of canteen
- Edmund Burns as Reggie
- Alma Rubens as Rosie
- Yola d'Avril as Yvette

== Music ==
The film featured a theme song titled "There Is A Happy Land (Far Far Away)" with words by Joe Young and Sam M. Lewis and music by Harry Akst. Also featured on the soundtrack are the songs "Wait For Me" and "Judy" which were both composed by the same trio.

== See also ==
- List of early sound feature films (1926–1929)
