= The Secret Studio =

1927 film by Victor Schertzinger

- Directed by: Victor Schertzinger
- Screenplay by: James Kevin McGuinness
- Based on: The Secret Studio by Hazel Livingston
- Starring: Olive Borden; John Holland; Noreen Phillips; Ben Bard; Kate Bruce; Joseph Cawthorn
- Cinematography: Glen MacWilliams
- Production company: Fox Film Corporation
- Distributed by: Fox Film Corporation
- Release date: June 19, 1927
- Running time: 60 minutes
- Country: United States
- Language: Silent (English intertitles)

The Secret Studio is a 1927 American silent drama film directed by Victor Schertzinger and written by James Kevin McGuinness. The film stars Olive Borden, John Holland, Noreen Phillips, Ben Bard, Kate Bruce, and Joseph Cawthorn. The film was released on June 19, 1927, by Fox Film Corporation.

== Cast ==
- Olive Borden as Rosemary Merton
- John Holland as Sloan Whitney
- Noreen Phillips as Elsie Merton
- Ben Bard as Larry Kane
- Kate Bruce as Ma Merton
- Joseph Cawthorn as Pa Merton
- Margaret Livingston as Nina Clark
- Walter McGrail as Mr. Kyler
- Lila Leslie as Mrs. Kyler
- Ned Sparks as The Plumber

== Censorship ==
When The Secret Studio was released, many states and cities in the United States had censor boards that could require cuts or other eliminations before the film could be shown. The Kansas censor board ordered a cut of a scene where a character reads a newspaper with the headline, "Nude Model Blinds Artist in Love Row."

== Preservation ==
The Secret Studio is considered to be a lost film.
