= Lloyd Nosler =

American film director

- Born: Lloyd Leonard Nosler; March 13, 1901; Riverton, Oregon, USA
- Died: September 26, 1985 (aged 84); Hanford, California, USA
- Occupations: Film editor, film director
- Spouses: Roberta Fulenwider (m. 1927) Olivia Winter (m. 1951)

Lloyd Leonard Nosler (March 13, 1901 – September 26, 1985) was an American film editor, director, and screenwriter who worked in Hollywood in from the 1910s through the 1950s.

== Biography ==
Lloyd was born in Riverton, Oregon, to Charles Nosler and Ida Belle Wright. He left school at the age of 14, and worked for a time as a paperboy for The Spokesman Review.

He later took on a job as an office boy at Universal Studios after his family relocated to Los Angeles. In 1918, he was given a promotion to the photography department, where he cut his teeth editing Kaiser, Beast of Berlin. The next year, after editing Cassiday of the Air Lanes, he became specifically renowned for cutting action films after catching the eye of Tom Mix. Work on films like Ben Hur followed at MGM; the studio kept him under contract for seven years.

In 1937, he went back to school, compelled by a desire to change careers and pursue screenwriting. During World War II, however, he used his editing skills to cut more than 200 service films while serving as a briefing officer in the U.S. Air Force.

== Selected filmography ==
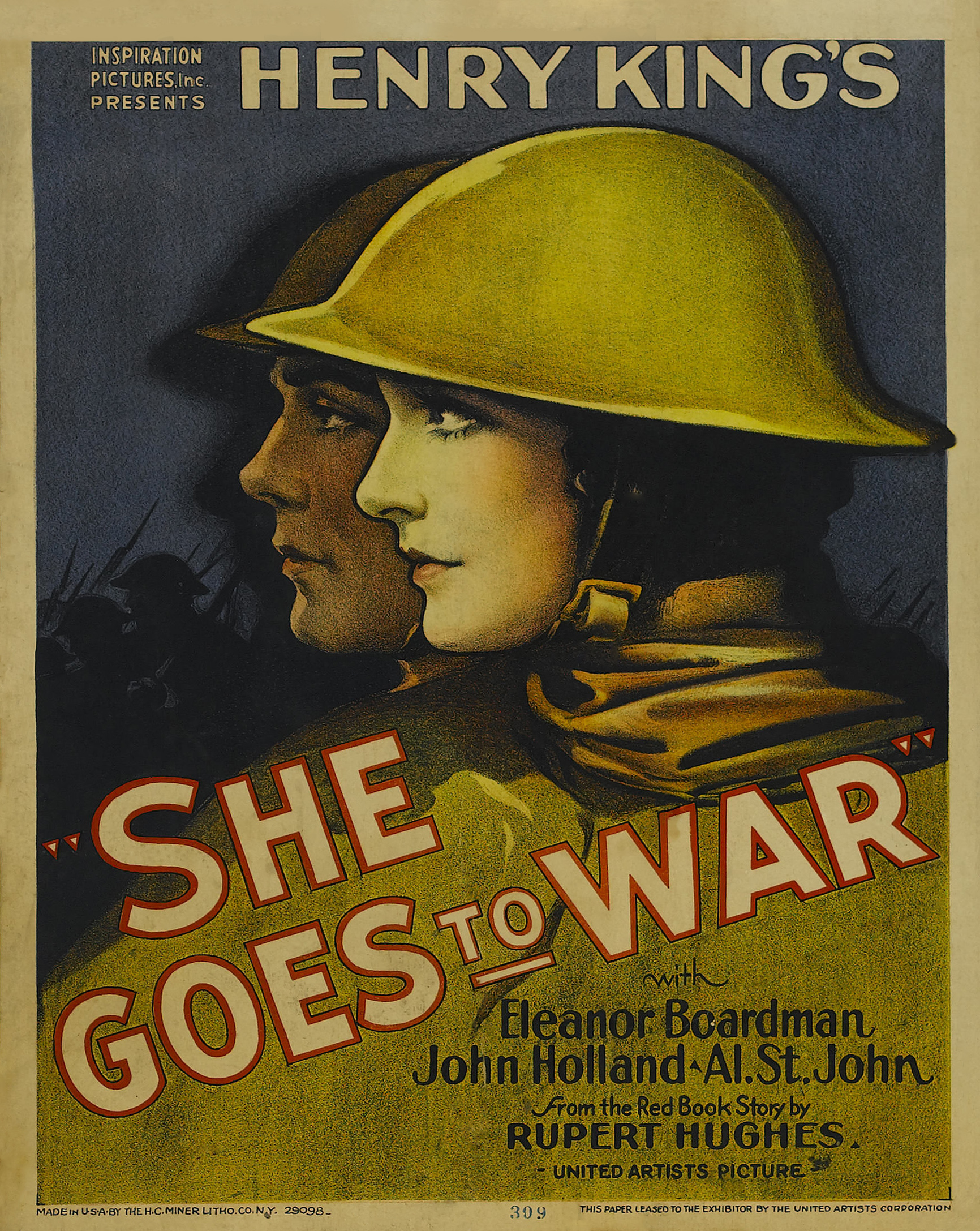
Poster - She Goes to War

As editor:

- Pot o' Gold (1941)
- The River (1938)
- The Hurricane (1937)
- Slave Ship (1937)
- Everybody's Old Man (1936)
- Blood Money (1933)
- Reaching for the Moon (1930)
- The Eyes of the World (1930)
- Hell Harbor (1930)
- She Goes to War (1929)
- The Shakedown (1929)
- Flesh and the Devil (1926)
- The Temptress (1926)
- Blarney (1926)
- Ben-Hur: A Tale of the Christ (1925)
- The Silent Accuser (1924)
- The Red Lily (1924)
- Thy Name Is Woman (1924)
- Strangers of the Night (1923)
- The Famous Mrs. Fair (1923)
- The Great Air Robbery (1919)

As screenwriter:

- Western Trails (1938)
- The Dawn Rider (1935)

As director:

- The Man from Death Valley (1931)
- Son of the Border (1933)
- Single-Handed Sanders (1932)
