= Elizabeth Dilling =

American writer and political activist (1894–1966)

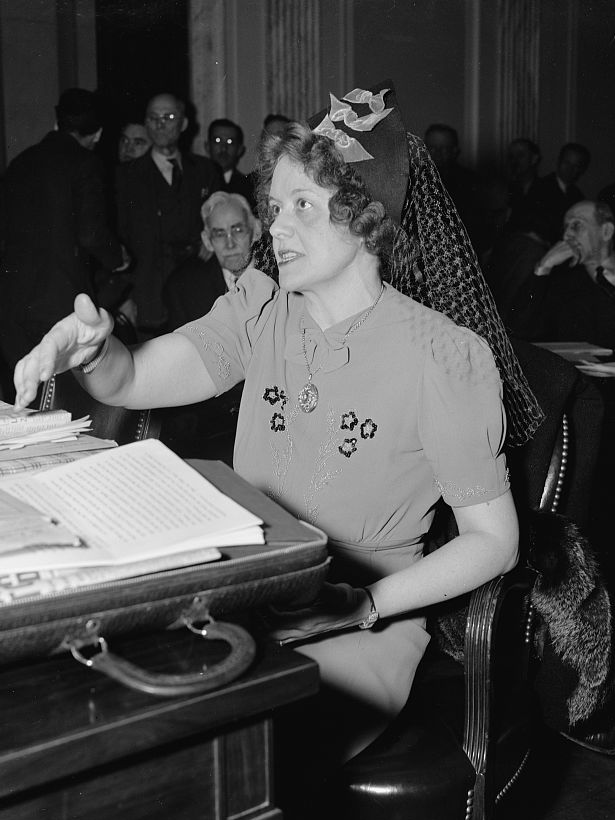
- Dilling addressing the Senate Judiciary Subcommittee, January 11, 1939 (Note: The ("unverified") Library of Congress caption reads: "Assailing all liberals, including the Roosevelt family, before the Senate Judiciary Subcommittee today, Mrs. Elizabeth Dilling, author of the Anti-Communist Volume 'The Red Network,' gave a regular show to a crowded hearing room in opposing the nomination of Felix Frankfurter to the Supreme Court. She challenged the committee collectively and individually to disprove anything she writes or says".)
- Born: Elizabeth Eloise Kirkpatrick; April 19, 1894; Chicago, Illinois, U.S.
- Died: April 30, 1966 (aged 72); Lincoln, Nebraska, U.S.
- Occupations: Writer; political activist
- Spouses: Albert Dilling (m. 1918; div. 1943); Jeremiah Stokes (m. 1948; died 1954)
- Children: 2

Elizabeth Eloise Kirkpatrick Dilling (April 19, 1894 – April 30, 1966) was an American writer and political activist. In 1934, she published The Red Network—A Who's Who and Handbook of Radicalism for Patriots, which catalogs over 1,300 people Dilling stated were suspected communists or fellow travelers. Her books and lecture tours established her as the pre-eminent female right-wing activist of the 1930s, and one of the most outspoken critics of the New Deal, which she referred to as the "Jew Deal". In the mid-to-late 1930s, Dilling praised Nazi Germany.

Dilling was the best-known leader of the World War II women's isolationist movement, a grass-roots campaign that pressured Congress to refrain from helping the Allies. She was among 28 anti-war campaigners charged with sedition in 1942; the charges were dropped in 1946. While academic studies have predominantly ignored both the anti-war "Mothers' movement" and right-wing activist women in general, Dilling's writings secured her a lasting influence among right-wing groups. She organized the Paul Reveres, an anti-communist organization, and was a member of the America First Committee.

== Early life and family ==
Dilling was born Elizabeth Eloise Kirkpatrick on April 19, 1894, in Chicago, Illinois. Her father, Lafayette Kirkpatrick, was a surgeon of Scotch-Irish ancestry; her mother, Elizabeth Harding, was of English and French ancestry. Her father died when she was six weeks old, after which her mother added to the family income by selling real estate. Dilling's brother, Lafayette Harding Kirkpatrick, who was seven years her senior, became wealthy by the age of 23 after developing properties in Hawaii. Dilling had an Episcopalian upbringing, and attended a Catholic girls' school, Academy of Our Lady. She was highly religious, and was known to send her friends 40-page letters about the Bible. Prone to bouts of depression, she went on vacations in the US, Canada, and Europe with her mother.

In 1912, she enrolled at the University of Chicago, where she studied music and languages, intending to become an orchestral musician. She studied the harp under Walfried Singer, the Chicago Symphony's harpist. She left after three years before graduating, lonely and bitterly disillusioned. In 1918, she married Albert Dilling, an engineer studying law who attended the same Episcopalian church as Elizabeth. The couple were well off financially, thanks to Elizabeth's inherited money and Albert's job as chief engineer for the Chicago Sewerage District. They lived in Wilmette, a Chicago suburb, and had two children, Kirkpatrick in 1920, and Elizabeth Jane in 1925.

The family traveled abroad at least ten times between 1923 and 1939, experiences that focused Dilling's political outlook and served to convince her of American superiority. In 1923, they visited Britain, France and Italy. Offended by the lack of gratitude from the British for American intervention in World War I, Dilling vowed to oppose any future American involvement in European conflict. They spent a month in the Soviet Union in 1931, where local guides, who Dilling claimed were Jews, told her that communism would take over the world and showed her a map of the US in which the cities were renamed after Soviet heroes. She documented her travels in home movies, filming such scenes as bathers swimming nude in a river beneath a Moscow church. She was appalled by communism's "atheism, sex degeneracy, broken homes [and] class hatred."

Dilling visited Germany in 1931 and, when she returned in 1938, noted a "great improvement of conditions". She attended Nazi Party meetings, and the German government paid her expenses. She wrote that "The German people under Hitler are contented and happy. ... don't believe the stories you hear that this man has not done a great good for this country." (Note: Dilling's perception of Hitler shifted after the war. In the June 1954 Patriotic Research Bulletin, she states: "Evidence piles up and up that Hitler himself was not only of Jewish ancestry, but had Jewish financing from the very beginning ... At no time did Hitler disturb the great Jewish bankers who own and run German industry.") In 1938, she toured Palestine, where she filmed what she described as Jewish immigrants ruining the country. While touring Spain, then embroiled in the Spanish Civil War, she filmed "Red torture chambers" and burnt-out churches, "ruined by the Reds with the same satanic Jewish glee shown in Russia." She visited Japan, which she viewed as the only Christian nation in Asia, and in 1939, she returned to visit Spain, for a second time.

Dilling wrote of Nazi Germany in 1936:

"Nazism has directed its attacks more against conspiring, revolutionary Communist Jews, than against nationalist German Jews who aided Germany during the war; if it has discriminated against the innocent also, it has been with no such ferocity and loss of life as the planned and imminent Communist revolution would have wreaked upon the German population, had it been successful as in Russia."

== Anti-communism ==
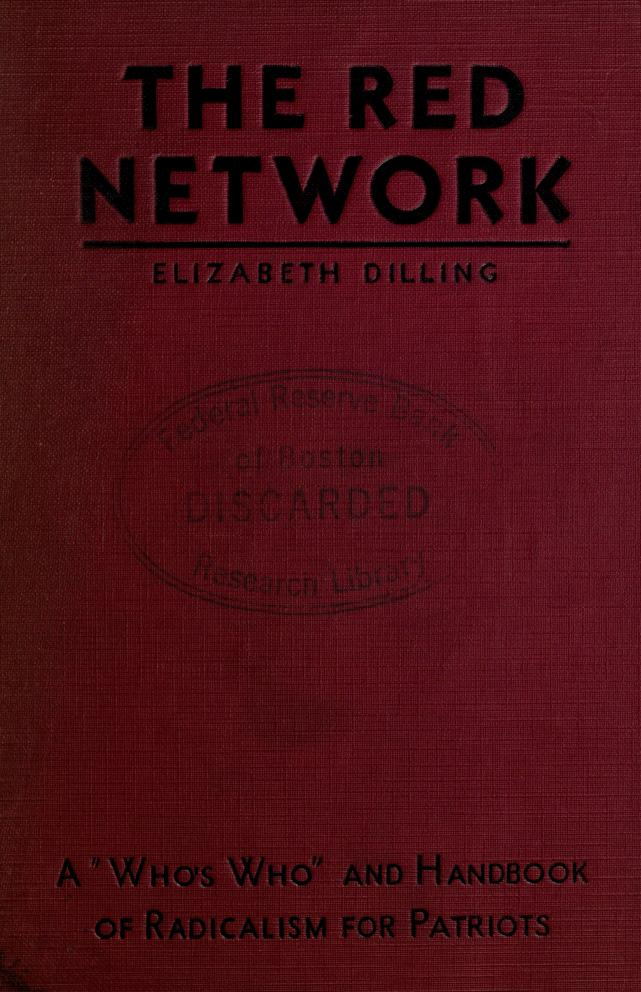
Dilling self-published The Red Network (here, cover from 1934 printing), reprinted several times, which helped launch her political activities

Our family trip to Red Russia in 1931 started my dedication to anti-Communism. We were taken behind the scenes by friends working for the Soviet Government and saw deplorable conditions, first hand. We were appalled, not only at the forced labor, the squalid crowded living quarters, the breadline ration card workers' stores, the mothers pushing wheelbarrows and begging children of the State nurseries besieging us. The open virulent anti-Christ campaign, every-where, was a shock. In public places were the tirades by loud speaker, in Russian, (our friends translated). Atheist cartoons representing Christ as a villain, a drunk, and the object of a cannibalistic orgy (Holy Communion): as an oppressor of labor; again as trash being dumped from a wheelbarrow by the Soviet Five-Year-Plan – these lurid cartoons filled the big bulletin boards in the churches our Soviet guides took us to visit.

— The Plot against Christianity, 1964

Dilling's political activism was spurred by the "bitter opposition" she encountered upon her return to Illinois in 1931, "against my telling the truth about Russia ... from suburbanite 'intellectual' friends and from my own Episcopal minister." She began public speaking as a hobby, following her doctor's advice. Iris McCord, a Chicago radio broadcaster who taught at the Moody Bible Institute, arranged for her to address local church groups. Within a year Dilling was touring the Midwest, the Northeast and occasionally the West Coast, accompanied by her husband. She showed her home movies of the Soviet Union and made the same speech several times a week to audiences sometimes as large as several hundred, hosted by organizations such as the Daughters of the American Revolution (DAR) and the American Legion.

In 1932, Dilling co-founded the Paul Reveres, an anti-communist organization with headquarters in Chicago which eventually had 200 local chapters. She left in 1934, after rejecting the co-founder Col. Edwin Marshall Hadley's antisemitism, and it folded soon after due to lack of interest. With McCord's encouragement, her lectures were published in a local Wilmette newspaper in 1932, and then collected in a pamphlet entitled Red Revolution: Do We Want It Here? Dilling claimed that the DAR printed and distributed thousands of copies.

Beginning in early 1933, Dilling spent twelve to eighteen hours a day for eighteen months researching and cataloging suspected subversives. Her sources included the 1920 four-volume report of the Joint Legislative Committee to Investigate Seditious Activities, and Representative Hamilton Fish's 1931 report of an anti-communist investigation. The result was The Red Network—A Who's Who and Handbook of Radicalism for Patriots, hailed with irony in The New Republic as a "handy, compact reference work". The first half of the 352-page book was a collection of essays, mostly copied from Red Revolution. The second half contained descriptions of more than 1,300 "Reds" (including international figures such as Albert Einstein and Chiang Kai-shek), and more than 460 organizations described as "Communist, Radical Pacifist, Anarchist, Socialist, [or] I.W.W. controlled".

Far more than the Spider-Web chart of the 1920s – a chart composed by a member of the DAR that plotted suspected red-affiliated organisations with progressive individuals – The Red Network revealed the power of "guilt by association," a tactic that would be used all too often by future Red baiters with devastating effectiveness.

— Christine K. Erickson, Journal of American Studies, 2002

The book was reprinted eight times and sold more than 16,000 copies by 1941. Thousands more were given away. It was sold in Chicago book stores and by mail order from Dilling's house. Subscribers to Gerald Winrod's new journal, The Revealer, received a copy; fundamentalist preacher W. B. Riley, president of the Northwest Bible Training School, claimed he had given away hundreds of copies; and it was advertised and sold by the Moody Bible Institute. It was endorsed by officials in the DAR and the American Legion. Copies were bought by the Pinkerton Detective Agency, the New York Police Department, the Chicago Police Department, and the Federal Bureau of Investigation. A Los Angeles arms manufacturer bought and distributed 150 copies, and a tear gas manufacturer bought 1,500 copies, which it distributed to the Standard Oil Company, the National Guard, and hundreds of police departments.

In 1935, Dilling returned to her alma mater to accuse such people as university president Robert Maynard Hutchins, educational reformer John Dewey, activist Jane Addams, and Republican Senator William Borah of being communist sympathizers. Retail tycoon Charles R. Walgreen asked for her help to obtain a public hearing after his niece complained that professors at the university were communists. They demanded the closure of the university. The Illinois legislature convened to discuss the matter, ultimately deciding that the claims were unfounded. Dilling delivered a frenetic half-hour speech at the Illinois General Assembly, with calls from the audience to "kill every communist". She declared, "It is certain that the University of Chicago is diseased with Communism and that its contagion is a menace to the community and the Nation."

Dilling's next book, The Roosevelt Red Record and Its Background, published two weeks before the 1936 presidential election, was less successful. Like much of her later writing, it was largely a disjointed series of quotations. President Franklin D. Roosevelt's New Deal was already a central theme of The Red Network, and it was already being debated elsewhere. Dilling later claimed that the House Un-American Activities Committee was founded largely thanks to her two books. She wrote a pamphlet attacking Borah, entitled Borah: "Borer from Within" the G.O.P., fearing that if he won the presidential nomination voters would be forced to choose between two communists. She distributed 5,000 copies at the Republican National Convention, and claimed credit for his defeat. (Note: Historian Glen Jeansonne notes: "Of all the ultraright women leaders, Dilling was the most critical of Eleanor Roosevelt. In The Roosevelt Red Record and Its Background (Chicago: self-published, 1936), Dilling devoted more space to criticizing Eleanor Roosevelt than she devoted to denouncing Franklin Roosevelt. Among her charges were that Eleanor entertained prostitutes, fraternized with Blacks, joined communist organisations, neglected her children, dominated her weak husband, and associated with Jews. Perhaps there was no better litmus test of a woman's political ideology than a woman's opinion of Eleanor Roosevelt.")

In 1938, Dilling founded the Patriotic Research Bureau, a vast archive in Chicago with a staff of "Christian women and girls" from the Moody Bible Institute. She began regular publication of the Patriotic Research Bulletin, a newsletter outlining her political and personal views, which she mailed free of charge to her supporters. Editions were often 25 to 30 pages long, with a youthful photograph of the author on the cover conveying a personal touch. The masthead of early issues reads: "Patriotic Research Bureau. For the defense of Christianity and Americanism".

Dilling was paid $5,000 in 1939 by industrialist Henry Ford to investigate communism at the University of Michigan. As well as distributing his antisemitic newspaper The Dearborn Independent during the 1920s, Ford was a financial supporter of dozens of antisemitic propagandists. Dilling discovered hundreds of books at the university library written by "radicals". Her 96-page report stated that the university was "typical of those American colleges which have permitted Marxist-bitten, professional theorists to inoculate wholesome American youths with their collectivist propaganda." She reached a similar conclusion when the Los Angeles Chamber of Commerce paid her to investigate UCLA, and when she investigated her children's universities, Cornell and Northwestern.

In 1940, hoping to influence the presidential election, Dilling published The Octopus, setting out her theories of Jewish Communism. The book was published under the pseudonym "Rev. Frank Woodruff Johnson". Avedis Derounian reported Dilling claiming that "The Jews can never prove that I'm anti-Semitic, I'm too clever for them." Her husband feared that allegations of antisemitism would damage his law practice. She admitted that she was the author at her divorce trial in 1942. She explained that she wrote the book as a response to B'nai B'rith. She stated: "It airs their dirty lying attempts to shut every Christian mouth and prevent anyone from getting a fair trial in this country" (for which she was cited for contempt).

== Isolationism ==
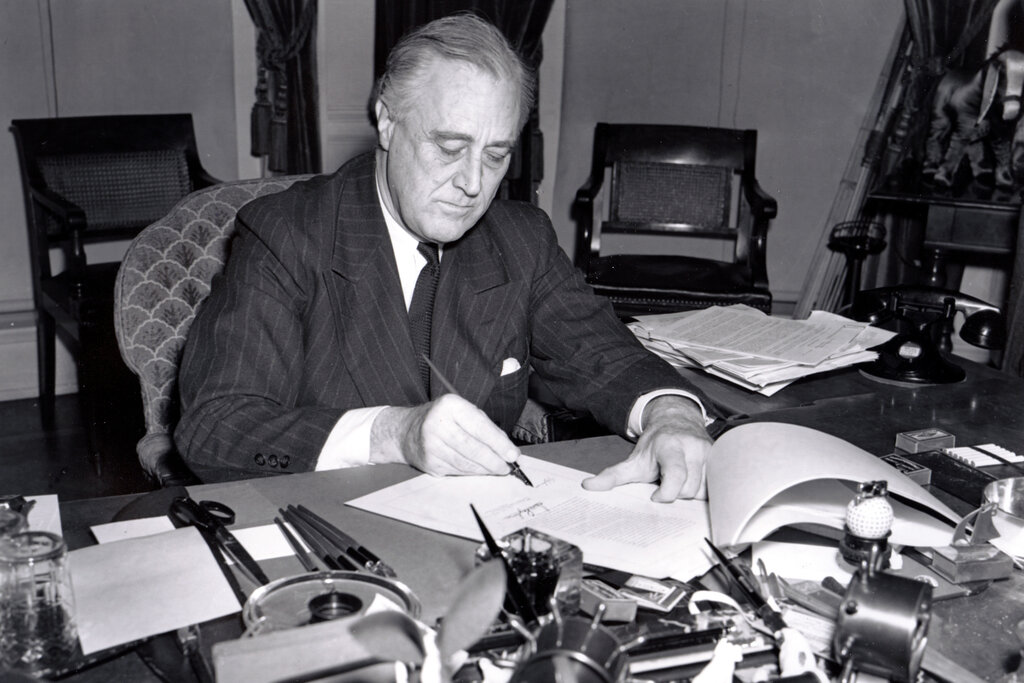
Dilling opposed the Lend-Lease Act, here being signed by Franklin Delano Roosevelt March 11, 1941

Besides relying on a gendered appeal to patriotic duty, Dilling enjoyed portraying herself as a helpless victim confronted by diabolical evil. One telling example was when a federal subpoena in 1941, issued by the Justice Department, ordered her to Washington DC to explain her alleged affiliations with Nazi sympathizers. She described her experiences at the "New Deal O.G.P.U.," an unsubtle reference to Stalin's secret police, in the format of a play, in which she acted the part of the victim interrogated by an agent of the New Deal. The dramatic scene overflowed with "sinister glower[s]," "sarcastic questions" and "long harangue[s]." The victim, "a bit weary with the endless hectoring," answered unfair questions with righteous indignation. Throughout this little skit, Dilling downplayed her public role and denied the accusation that she was "an important woman" and that her "name carr[ied] weight." A sincere act of humility this was not, but it did reveal Dilling's inclination for martyrdom and self-importance, as well as a talent for propaganda.

— Erickson, 2002 (Note: Quoting Patriotic Research Bulletin, October 1941)

Dilling was a central figure in a mass movement of isolationist women's groups, which opposed US involvement in World War II from a "maternalist" perspective. The membership of these groups in 1941 was between one and six million. According to historian Kari Frederickson: "They argued that war was the antithesis of nurturant motherhood, and that as women they had a particular stake in preventing American involvement in the European conflict. ... they intertwined their maternalist arguments with appeals that were right-wing, anti-Roosevelt, anti-British, anti-communist and anti-Semitic."

The movement was strongest in the Midwest, a conservative stronghold with a culture of antisemitism, which had long resented the political dominance of the East Coast. Chicago was the base of far-right activists Charles E. Coughlin, Gerald L. K. Smith and Lyrl Clark Van Hyning, as well as the America First Committee, which had 850,000 members by 1941. Dilling spoke at America First meetings, and was involved in the founding of Van Hyning's "We the Mothers Mobilize for America", a highly active group with 150,000 members who were tasked with infiltrating other organizations. The Chicago Tribune, the newspaper with the highest circulation in the region, was strongly isolationist. It treated Dilling as a trusted expert on anti-communism and continued to support her after she was charged with sedition. (Note: According to historian Glen Jeansonne: "Although the committee repudiated the support of fascist sympathizers, its membership included partisans of far-right organizations such as Coughlin's, Smith's, and the mothers' groups. The mothers' movement and the committee recruited members from each other. In January 1941, for example, ten thousand members of the Roll Call of American Women, based in Chicago, voted to merge with the committee because their aims were similar.")

In early 1941, when the movement was at its height, Dilling spoke at rallies in Chicago and other cities in the Midwest, and recruited a group to coordinate her efforts to oppose Lend-Lease, the "Mothers' Crusade to Defeat H. R. 1776". Hundreds of these activists picketed the Capitol for two weeks in February 1941. Dilling was arrested when she led a sit-down strike with at least 25 other protesters in the corridor outside the office of 84-year-old Senator Carter Glass. After a sensational trial lasting six days, she wept as she was found guilty of disorderly conduct and fined $25. Glass called for the FBI to investigate the women's groups, and stated in The New York Times on March 7 that the women had caused "a noisy disorder of which any self-respecting fishwife would be ashamed. I likewise believe that it would be pertinent to inquire whether they are mothers. For the sake of the race, I devoutly hope not." Isolationist leader Cathrine Curtis believed that the image of the Mothers' movement had been wrecked, and privately criticised Dilling's "hoodlum" tactics as "communistic" and "un-womanly".

Many of the women's groups continued to oppose the war after the attack on Pearl Harbor, unlike their allies, the America First Committee. Dilling campaigned for Thomas E. Dewey in the 1944 presidential election, although she accused him of "fawning at the feet of international Jewry". Her political activity decreased as a result of her highly publicized divorce trial, beginning in February 1942, during which dozens of fist fights broke out, involving both men and women, and Dilling received three citations for contempt. The judge, Rudolph Desort, said that he feared he would suffer "a nervous breakdown" during the four-month trial. (Note: Albert filed a countersuit, making allegations including alcoholism and drug addiction, and accusing her of being a fanatic who incited "class and religious hatred". She sued for libel when radio broadcaster Walter Winchell reported the claims. Albert fired his counsel, Maurice Weinshenk, for demanding that his wife produce a list of Bureau contributors, including any Axis or foreign government agents. Weinshenk stated that Albert was concerned he could be implicated in such an investigation. In May, an uncontested divorce was agreed. Albert blamed Weinshenk and B'nai B'rith for his allegations and Dilling dropped her libel suit. In June however they decided not to divorce. Albert acted as her lawyer at her sedition trial. They finally divorced in October 1943. She re-married in 1948 to Salt Lake City lawyer, Jeremiah Stokes, who died in 1954 six years later.)

A grand jury, convened in 1941 to investigate fascist propaganda, called several women's leaders to testify, including Dilling, Curtis and Van Hyning. Roosevelt prevailed upon Attorney General Francis Biddle to launch a prosecution, and on July 21, 1942, Dilling and 27 other anti-war activists were indicted on two counts of conspiracy to cause insubordination of the military in peacetime and wartime. The case was the main part of a government campaign against domestic subversion, which historian Leo P. Ribuffo labelled "The Brown Scare". The charges and list of defendants were extended in January 1943. The charges were again extended in January 1944. The judge, Edward C. Eicher, suffered a fatal heart attack on November 29, 1944. Federal judge James M. Proctor declared a mistrial. The charges were dismissed by federal judge Bolitha Laws on November 22, 1946, after the government had failed to present any compelling new evidence of a German conspiracy. Biddle later called the proceedings "a dreary farce".

== Post-war publications ==
Following the 1946 trial dismissal, Dilling continued to publish the Patriotic Research Bulletin. She later became a Holocaust denier and accused Dwight D. Eisenhower of secretly being Jewish. In 1964, she published The Plot Against Christianity. The book purports to "reveal the satanic hatred of Christ and Christians responsible for their mass murder, torture and slave labour in all Iron Curtain countries – all of which are ruled by Talmudists". After her death, it was retitled The Jewish Religion: Its Influence Today.

The UN Charter and treaties are constructed to make way for the "man of sin," the Anti-Christ who will hold supreme power over life or death as he briefly heads this last Red satanic world empire.

— Patriotic Research Bulletin, September – October 1954

Dilling died on April 30, 1966, in Lincoln, Nebraska.

== Media references ==
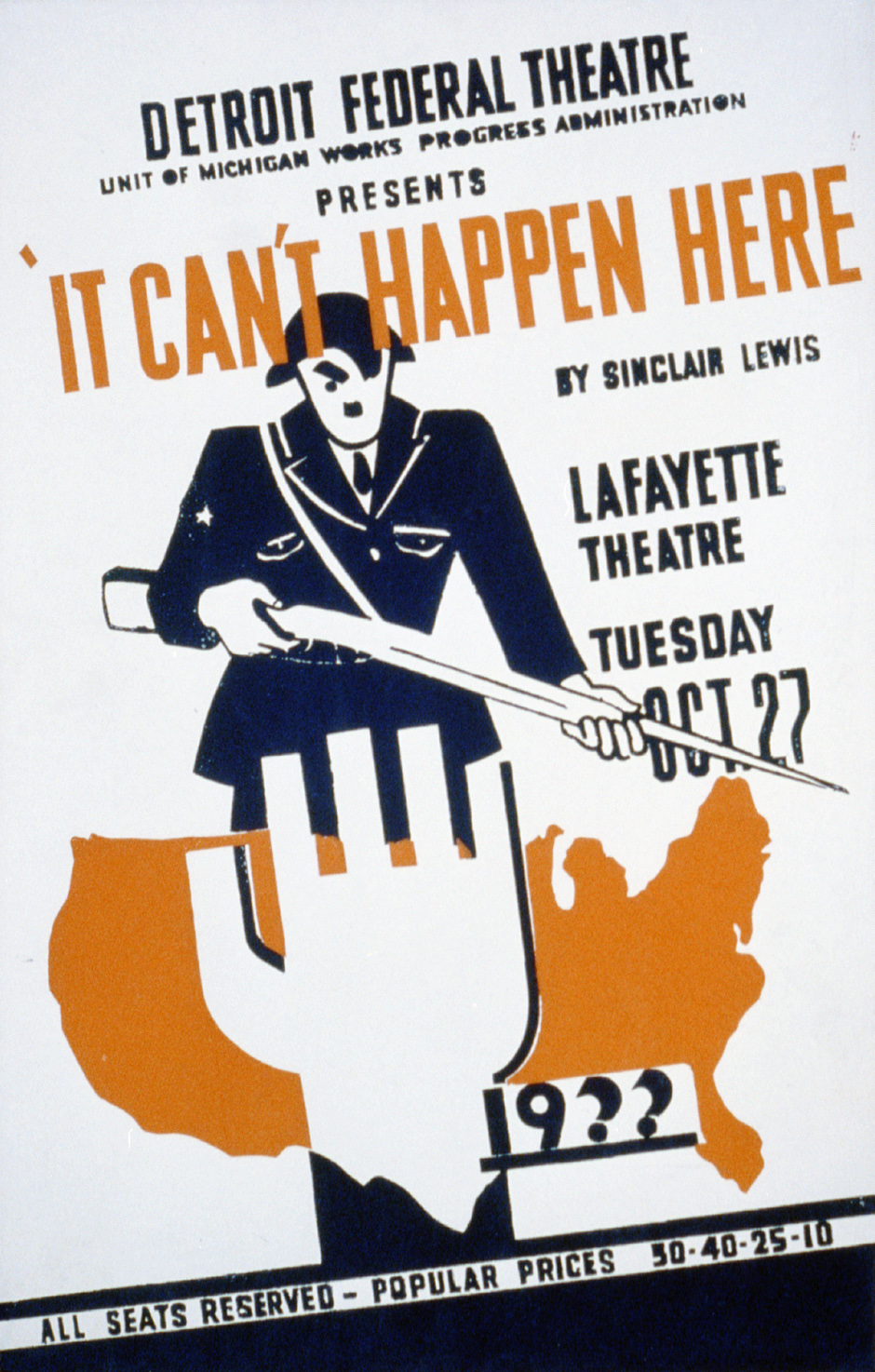
Theatre poster for Sinclair Lewis' 1936 It Can't Happen Here, in which a character based on Dilling appears

- A character based on Dilling named "Adelaide Tarr Gimmitch" appears in the novel It Can't Happen Here (1935) by Sinclair Lewis. The book describes a fascist takeover in the US.
- "Who then, is Mrs Dilling? Upon what strange meat has she been fed that she hath grown so great: And what inspired her, she who might have taken up knitting or petunia-growing, to adopt as her hobby the deliberate and sometimes hasty criticism of men and women she has never seen." — Harry Thornton Moore, "The Lady Patriot's Book", The New Republic, January 8, 1936
- "To see the lady in action, screaming and leaping and ripping along at breakneck speed, is to see certain symptoms of simple hysteria on the loose." — Milton S. Mayer, "Mrs. Dilling: Lady of the Red Network", American Mercury, July 1939
- "I have rarely seen hatred take complete possession of a woman's face as when Elizabeth Dilling stormed around the corridors shouting. She seemed like a woman pursued by the furies. What she did not know was that the furies were not outside her, but in her own mind." — Max Lerner describing an encounter in 1941, PM, 1943/44

== Works ==
According to the Library of Congress records, Dilling self-published the original printings of her books in Kenilworth, Illinois, then some 20 miles north of downtown Chicago. They were later republished by printing houses throughout the country, such as the Elizabeth Dilling Foundation in the 1960s, Arno Press in the 1970s and Sons of Liberty in the 1980s.

=== Books ===
- The Red Network, A "Who's Who" and Handbook of Radicalism for Patriots (1934, 1935, 1936, 1977)
- "Lady Patriot" Replies (1936)
- The Roosevelt Red Record and Its Background (1936)
- Dare We Oppose Red Treason? (1937). OCLC 11099317.
- The Red Betrayal of the Churches (1938). OCLC 8211409.
- The Octopus, by Rev. Frank Woodruff Johnson [pseud.] (Oct. 1940; Sons of Liberty, 1985, 1986)
- The Plot Against Christianity (1964)
  - Republished as The Jewish Religion: Its Influence Today.
