= Mothers' movement =

World War II-era anti-war group in the United States

The mothers' movement was an anti-war women's movement in the United States, beginning in California in 1939, soon after the start of World War II. At its height, it consisted of 50 to 100 loosely-confederated groups, with a total membership that may have been as high as five or six million.

They organized petitions and demonstrations, published material, and were active in political campaigns. They are credited with having delayed U.S. involvement with the Allies. Their activity declined after the Great Sedition Trial (later found to be unconstitutional by the Supreme Court) of 1944 that criminalized anti-war activism, but their leaders' opposition to the war continued.

== Beginning ==
The movement originated in 1939 in Los Angeles, California, with the National League of Mothers of America. It gradually grew into a loose confederation of 50 to 100 groups that developed on the West Coast, the Midwest, and the East Coast. The members of these groups were largely white middle-aged middle-class Christian women; their leaders were exclusively college-educated upper-middle-class Christians. The groups published books, pamphlets, and newsletters opposed to the war. The members testified before congress, picketed the White House, collected petitions, and participated in political campaigns. The leaders most likely learned their organizing experience from women's clubs, political parties, or movements led by men.

== Great Sedition Trial ==
The mother's movement was involved in the Great Sedition Trial of 1944 in which the government charged an assortment of 30 heterogeneous individuals with violations of the Smith Act of 1940 and the Sedition Act of 1917. The defendants were held to be pro-fascist participants in a Nazi conspiracy. US President Franklin D. Roosevelt pressured US Attorney General Francis Biddle into indicting the activists for sedition. Some of the leaders called to testify before the grand jury were Elizabeth Dilling, Cathrine Curtis, and Lyrl Clark Van Hyning.

A mistrial was declared on November 29, 1944, sometime after the death of the trial judge, ex-Representative Edward C. Eicher.

== End ==
The mother's movement failed to accomplish its main goal of ending involvement in World War II, which led to the declining enthusiasm for the cause. The movement slowly diminished after the war ended. The leaders mostly dispersed into different paths, and most of them lost the distinction that they once had during the 1930s and the 1940s.

== Sources ==
- Glen Jeansonne (9 June 1997). Women of the Far Right: The Mothers' Movement and World War II. University of Chicago Press. ISBN 978-0-226-39589-0.
- Lawrence, Dennis, and Maximilian John St. George. A Trial on Trial; the Great Sedition Trial of 1944. National Civil Rights Committee, 1946.
- Berkowitz, June Melby. Days of Discontent:American Women and Right-Wing Politics, 1933–1945. Northern Illinois University Press, 2002
- Frost, J.(2010). Dissent and Consent in the "Good War": Hedda Hopper, Hollywood Gossip, and World War II Isolationism. Film History: An International Journal 22(2), 170–181. Indiana University Press
