= The Shepherd of the Hills (1919 film) =

1919 film directed by Louis F. Gottschalk and Harold Bell Wright

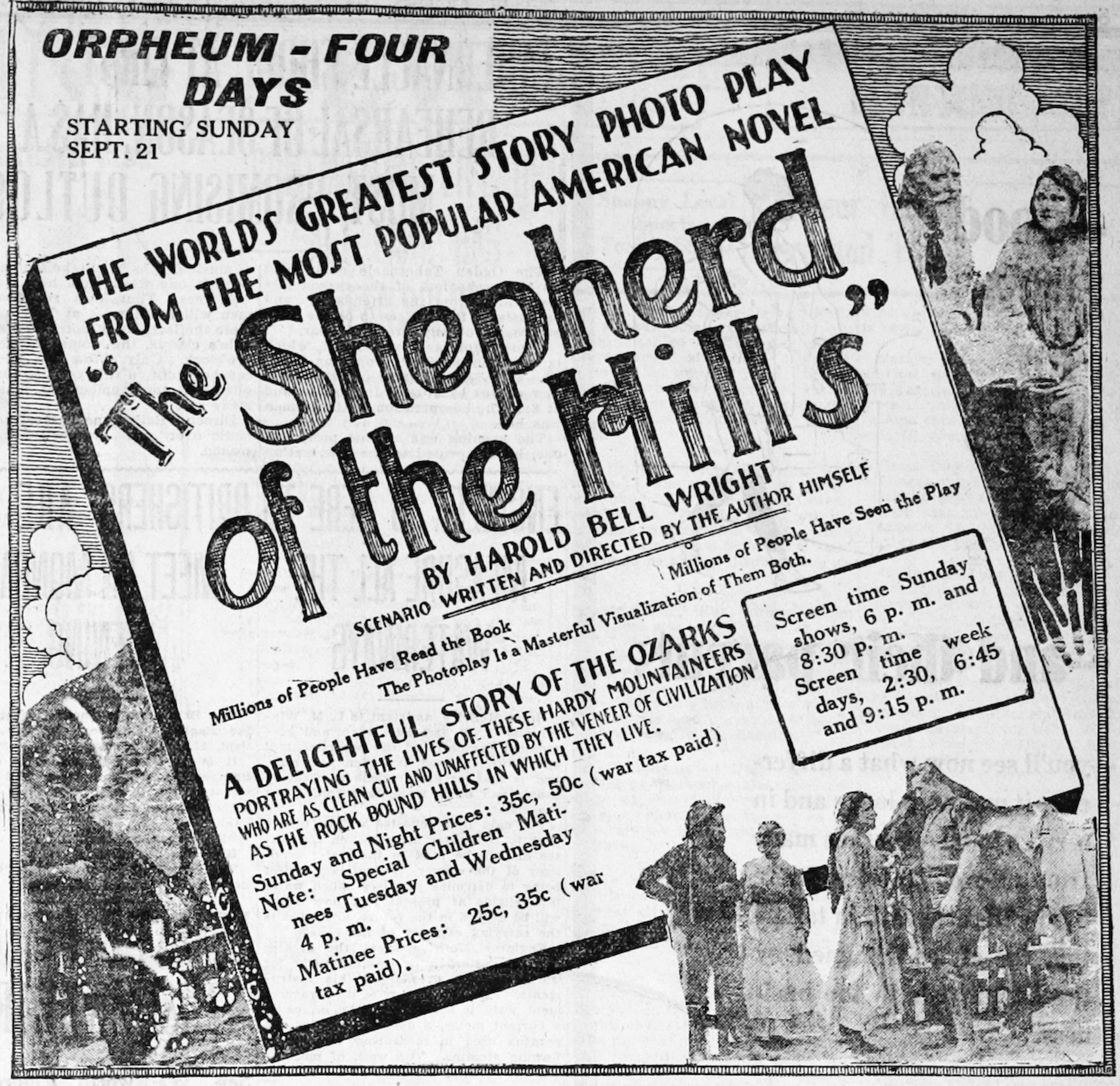
- Contemporary newspaper advertisement
- Directed by: Louis F. Gottschalk; Harold Bell Wright
- Written by: Harold Bell Wright
- Based on: The Shepherd of the Hills; 1907 novel by Harold Bell Wright
- Starring: Harry Lonsdale; Cathrine Curtis; George A. McDaniel
- Cinematography: Homer Scott
- Distributed by: W.T. Gaskell
- Release date: May 1919 (USA)
- Running time: 10 reels
- Country: United States
- Language: Silent (English intertitles)

The Shepherd of the Hills is a lost 1919 American silent drama film directed by Louis F. Gottschalk and Harold Bell Wright, and based on Bell Wright's 1909 novel of the same name. It was remade in 1941 by director Henry Hathaway.

== Plot ==
A world-weary man arrives in a small Ozark town to atone for the wrongdoing of his son, who had a child with one of the town's residents and left town years earlier.

== Cast ==
- Harry Lonsdale as The Shepherd
- Cathrine Curtis as Sammy Lane
- George A. McDaniel as Young Matt
- Don Bailey as Old Matt
- Elizabeth Rhodes as Aunt Molly
- Lon Poff as Jim Lane
- C. Edward Raynor as Little Pete
- Bert Sprotte as Wash Gibbs
- George Hackathorne as Ollie Stuart
- Louis Darclay as The Artist
- E.K. Kendall as Postmaster
- Ardita Mellinina as The Girl at the Spring (credited as Ardita Mellonino)
- William De Vaull as Doctor (credited as William P. Du Vaull)
- J. Edwin Brown as Uncle Ike

== Production ==
Wright was heavily involved in the production of the film; he preferred to shoot the film as more of a traditional play rather than cutting in and using close-ups of the actors. He even cast a neighbor, Phoenix resident Cathrine Curtis, as his leading lady. The film was produced by the Clune Film Company over the course of several months spanning from 1917 to 1918, and was shot in California and the Ozark Mountains of Missouri.
