= Cathrine Curtis =

American actress and producer (1889–1955)

- Born: Cathrine Taylor; 1889; Albany, New York, U.S.
- Died: 1955 (aged 65–66); California
- Occupations: Film producer, actress, political organizer
- Spouse(s): Joseph O'Neil, Perit Coit Myers, Jr.

Cathrine Curtis (1889–1955) was an American actress, film producer, investor, and radio personality. She was one of the first female film producers and was also a political organizer noted for her far-right and antisemitic views.

== Early life ==
Curtis was born in Albany, New York, attended boarding school in a suburb of New York and graduated from St. Agnes High School in Albany. She attended New York University but left before graduating.

== Career ==
Curtis owned and operated a ranch in Phoenix, Arizona. She began investing in stocks at the age of 15. In Phoenix, one of her neighbors was the novelist Harold Bell Wright, who invited her to Hollywood to play a role in his film, The Shepherd of the Hills.

=== Hollywood career ===
While working on the film, she decided that she wanted to become a producer that she would stay in Los Angeles. Her first credit as a producer was on King Vidor's 1921 silent film The Sky Pilot. She planned an adaptation of Arthur Conan Doyle's The Lost World (ultimately released in 1925), but legal wrangling ensued over rights. She was noted as one of the only film producers of her day and was notable for being the first woman in that position. Curtis ran her own production company, The Cathrine Curtis Pictures Corporation. Created in 1919, the company had offices in New York City and Los Angeles. She seems to have lost interest after she married her husband, Joseph O'Neill, but continued making advertorial films through the end of the decade.

=== Political leanings ===
After moving back to New York City after the stock market crash, she continued investing and became a radio personality, producing a twice-weekly show, Women and Money, for WMCA, in which she began espousing a brand of feminism centered on women's financial independence. Her criticism of the New Deal eventually led to cancelation of the program.

Curtis was also a far-right activist and organizer known for her anticommunist, antisemitism, and isolationist views. She created a number of committees and organizations in her day, including the National Legion of Mothers of America and the Women's National Committee to Keep the U.S. Out of War. Her criticism of the New Deal and her lobbying on behalf of women investors led her to create the Women Investors Research Institute, a non-profit organization that grew to 300,000 members in 1939.

== Personal life ==
Curtis was married several times; her husbands included lawyer Joseph O'Neil (divorced 1929) and Perit Coit Myers Jr. Myers and Curtis had a daughter, Gretchen, together.
