= The Eyes of the World (novel) =

1914 novel by Harold Bell Wright

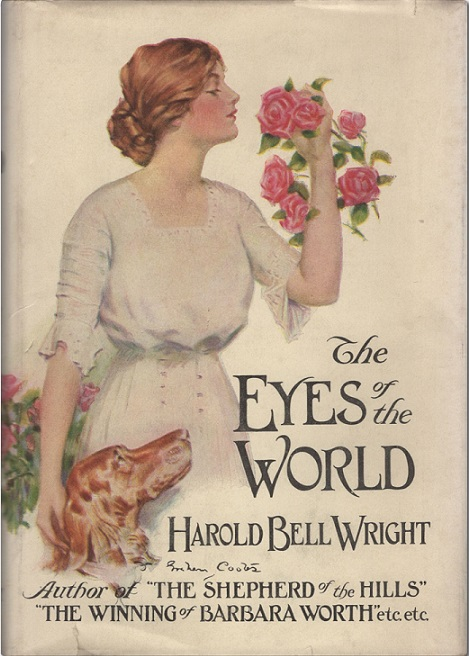
- Dust jacket
- Author: Harold Bell Wright
- Illustrator: Frank G. Cootes
- Language: English
- Published: August 1914
- Publisher: A.L. Burt Co./The Book Supply Company
- Publication place: United States
- Media type: Print
- Pages: 464

The Eyes of the World is a 1914 novel by Harold Bell Wright. It was the bestselling novel in the United States for that year.

Wright's works were very popular at the time, although this was the only one to top the year-end bestsellers list. Despite their popularity, Wright's moralistic tales were critically scorned. Owen Wister’s comments are representative: “I doubt if the present hour furnishes any happier symbols [of the quack novel] than we have in Mr. Wright [and The Eyes of the World]. It gathers into its four hundred and sixty pages all the elements ...of the quack-novel. It is,” Wister says, “stale, distorted, a sham, a puddle of words,” and “a mess of mildewed pap.”

This novel is set in "Fairlands", which is based on Redlands, California, and focuses on several artists and art patrons.

The Eyes of the World was released in August 1914, with an advertising budget of $100,000 to promote it. By the end of September 1914, it was claimed that 750,000 copies had been sold, and in November, that 8,000 copies were being bought daily. By Wright's own calculations in 1942, the novel had sold 925,000 total copies, the fifth-most among his output, all of which therefore would rank as "top bracket" best-sellers for their times.

== Adaptations ==
- The Eyes of the World (1917 film) (directed by Donald Crisp)
- The Eyes of the World (1930 film)
