= Notch, Missouri =

Unincorporated community in Missouri, U.S.

Coordinates: 36°40′34″N 93°20′19″W

Notch is an unincorporated community in Stone County, in the U.S. state of Missouri. Notch is located just north of Silver Dollar City on Missouri Route 76.

== History ==
A post office called Notch was established in 1895, and remained in operation until 1934. The community was named for "notches" (i.e. blazes) on the road through town. A variant name was "The Forks".
