= Harold Bell Wright =

American writer (1872–1944)

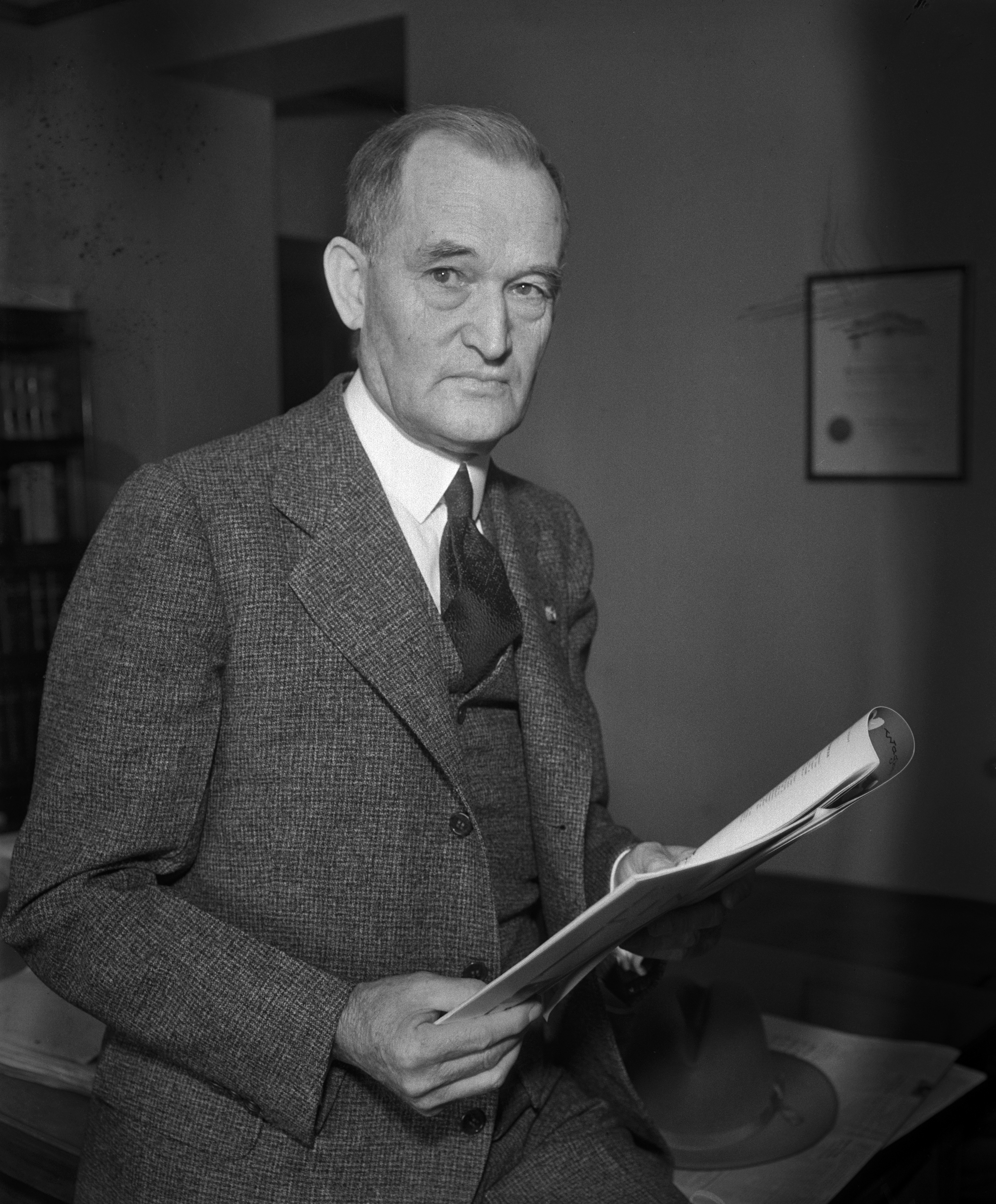
- Born: May 4, 1872; Rome, New York, US
- Died: May 24, 1944 (aged 72); La Jolla, California, US
- Occupations: Author, preacher
- Known for: The Shepherd of the Hills; The Winning of Barbara Worth
- Spouses: Frances Long-Wright (m. 1899; div. 1920) Winifred Mary Potter (m. 1920)
- Children: 3

Harold Bell Wright (May 4, 1872 – May 24, 1944) was a best-selling American writer of fiction, essays, and nonfiction. Although mostly forgotten or ignored after the middle of the 20th century, he had a very successful career; he is said to have been the first American writer to sell a million copies of a novel and the first to make $1 million from writing fiction. Between 1902 and 1942 Wright wrote 19 books, several stage plays, and many magazine articles. More than 15 movies were made or claimed to be made from Wright's stories, including Gary Cooper's first major movie, The Winning of Barbara Worth (1926) and the John Wayne film The Shepherd of the Hills (1941).

== Early life ==
Wright was born in Rome, New York, to Alma Watson and William A. Wright. In his autobiography, To My Sons, Wright reports that his father, a former Civil War lieutenant and lifetime alcoholic, dragged "his wife and children from place to place, existing from hand to mouth, sinking deeper and deeper, as the years passed, into the slough of wretched poverty."

His mother, on the other hand, paid close attention to the children, taught them moral principles and read to them from the Bible, Shakespeare, The Pilgrim's Progress and Hiawatha. From his mother Wright learned to appreciate the beauties of nature. When a neighbor taught young Wright to draw and paint, his mother nourished his artistic talents.

When Wright was 11, his mother died and his father abandoned the children. For the remainder of his childhood, Wright lived with various relatives or strangers, mostly in Ohio. He found odd jobs here and there, frequently sleeping under bridges or in haystacks. In his late teens he found regular employment painting both works of art and houses. After two years of what Wright called "pre-preparation" education at Hiram College in Hiram, Ohio, Wright became a minister for the Christian Church (Disciples of Christ) in Pierce City, Missouri.

He said, "As I have told you, after that first year of my disillusionment at Hiram College, I never deliberately, with malice aforethought, set out to be a preacher. I did not seek the job with the Pierce City Church, the job found me." 'To My Sons', pg. 204. Other churches he pastored were located in Pittsburg, Kansas; Forest Avenue in Kansas City, Missouri; Lebanon, Missouri; and Redlands, California.

== Writing and preaching career ==
In 1902, while pastoring the Christian Church in Pittsburg, Kansas, he wrote a melodramatic story, entitled That Printer of Udell's, which he intended to read to his congregation, one chapter per week, at successive Sunday night meetings. But before he read it to his congregation, the story was published in serial form in The Christian Century, his denomination's official journal.

Wright despised the magazine version so much that he "hid the poor mutilated corpse in the bottom of the least used drawer of my desk and moved on to other things" (To My Sons, p. 213). Yet parishioners enjoyed the story so much that they encouraged him to publish it in book form, which he did. But it was Wright's second novel, The Shepherd of the Hills, published in 1907 and set in Branson, Missouri, that established him as a best-selling author. That book also attracted an overwhelming number of tourists to the little-known town of Branson, resulting in its becoming a major tourist destination.

In 1905 Wright accepted the position of pastor at the Christian Church in Lebanon, Missouri. Wright remained there until 1907 when he accepted another pastoral position in California. In that same year, after the success of The Shepherd of the Hills (his first book to sell one million copies), Wright resigned as pastor of the Redlands, California, Christian Church, moved to a ranch near El Centro, California, and devoted the rest of his life to writing popular stories. In 1911, he published his most popular book, The Winning of Barbara Worth, a historical novel set in the Imperial Valley of southeastern California.

== Themes and later work ==
Wright was motivated to leave the ministry because he realized he could make more money writing fiction. In most of his novels, beginning with That Printer of Udell's, he attacked the hypocrisy and impractical nature of popular churches. To Wright, hard work, integrity and concrete efforts to aid people in need were far more important than church doctrines or sermons.

In 1909, pastors across America were incensed by his third book, The Calling of Dan Matthews, which told the story of a young preacher who, like Wright, resigned from the ministry in order to retain his integrity. The story included the town of Corinth, which was obviously Lebanon, Missouri. Several townspeople from Lebanon were highly disappointed in the novel and called it disgraceful. In 1910 Alexander Corkey wrote a novel that countered Wright's message. In The Victory of Allen Rutledge: A Tale of the Middle West, another young pastor in another midwestern town, faces moral challenges similar to those faced by Wright's hero. But in Corkey's book the pastor takes a courageous stand for principle, reforms the church and remains in the ministry. Though Wright's book quickly sold a million copies, Corkey's remained largely unknown.

Wright never responded to his critics, except to say that he never intended to create great literature, only to minister to ordinary people.

== Personal life ==
Harold Bell Wright married Frances Long in 1899 and they divorced in 1920. They had three children from this marriage: Gilbert Munger Wright (b. March 17, 1901, d. April 25, 1966), Paul Williams Wright (b. 1902, d. June 3, 1928, from an undetermined illness), and Norman Hall Wright (b. January 8, 1910, d. July 21, 2001). Wright married Winifred Mary Potter Duncan on August 5, 1920, and remained married to her until his death. He also maintained a home in Palm Springs, California.

== Later life and death ==
From 1914 to about 1933 Wright lived mostly in Tucson, Arizona. Wright's land on Tucson's east side became the Harold Bell Wright Estates subdivision and the streets bear names of some of his fictional characters and book titles such as Printer Udell, Barbara Worth, Shepherd Hills, Brian Kent, and Marta Hillgrove. A small city park in the neighborhood is named for him. His home has been restored and is now a private residence.

From 1935 until his death in 1944, Wright lived on his "Quiet Hills Farm" in or near Escondido, California. He traveled much, staying for months at a time in primitive camps, vacation homes, hotels or resorts, in such places as Riverside, San Diego, Palm Springs and Benbow, California; Tucson and Prescott, Arizona; Hawaii; and Barbados. Wright usually lived one or two years in a location before using it as the setting for one of his novels.

Wright struggled most of his life with lung disease. He died of bronchial pneumonia in Scripps Memorial Hospital in La Jolla, California on May 24, 1944, twenty days after his 72nd birthday, and was buried in the Cathedral Mausoleum, in Greenwood Memorial Park, in San Diego.

== Book sales compared to other authors ==
In 1945 Frank Luther Mott developed a system to compare top selling books from 1665 (Golden Multitudes, the Story of Bestsellers in the United States). To make comparisons possible, Mott defines a bestseller as a book with sales equal to one percent of the US population.

His ranking:

1. Charles Dickens, 16 bestsellers;
2. Erle Stanley Gardner, 7;
3. Sir Walter Scott, 6; and
4. James Fenimore Cooper, Gene Stratton Porter, and Harold Bell Wright, 5 each.

Scott and Dickens were not American authors, and Gardner's successes came later than Wright's. By Mott's reckoning Harold Bell Wright was one of only three American authors to write five best sellers from the arrival of the pilgrims in America through the first quarter of the 20th century. And Wright's total book sales were higher than Cooper and Porter. No American beat, or quite matched, Harold Bell Wright's record until Erle Stanley Gardner, whose career peaked 30 years after Wright's.

== Literary criticism ==
Wright's biographer, Lawrence V. Tagg (Harold Bell Wright: Storyteller to America, Westernlore Press, 1986), gathered a collection of contemporary attacks on Wright.

Owen Wister’s comments are representative: “I doubt if the present hour furnishes any happier symbols [of the quack novel] than we have in Mr. Wright [and The Eyes of the World]. It gathers into its four hundred and sixty pages all the elements ...of the quack-novel. It is,” Wister says, “stale, distorted, a sham, a puddle of words,” and “a mess of mildewed pap.” It was also number one on the Publishers Weekly bestseller list for 1914. In 1946, Irvin Harlow Hart wrote, "Harold Bell Wright supplied more negative data on the literary quality of the taste of the fiction reading public than any other author. No critic has ever damned Wright with even the faintest praise." (Hundred Leading Authors, p. 287)

Wonder Stories panned Wright's only science fiction novel, The Devil's Highway, in 1932, saying "If not for the mawkish sentimentality, and endless moralizing of this book, it might have been an interesting piece of work". Amazing Stories, however, found the novel "a very creditable attempt at combining two almost incompatible conceptions: The psychic and the physical" and concluded that The Devil's Highway "is quite enjoyable, as it is logical and exceedingly well written".

== California Historical Landmark ==
Wright's Tecolote Rancho Site is California Historical Landmark number 1034. A plaque reads:

NO. 1034 TECOLOTE RANCHO SITE (Imperial Valley home of Harold Bell Wright) - Prolific author Harold Bell Wright purchased 160 acres here in 1907. While living in a tent he built Rancho El Tecolote, constructing a woven arrowweed studio in 1908 and a ranch house in 1909. From 1907 to 1916 he wrote three best sellers, including the historical novel, The Winning of Barbara Worth, a chronicle of desert reclamation and the Colorado River flood of 1905. As Wright’s most successful and important book, it brought the Imperial Valley and its agricultural wealth to the attention of the nation. The book’s heroine Barbara Worth became an icon for the region.

== Published works ==
- That Printer of Udell's Book Supply Company, 1902–03
- The Shepherd of the Hills Book Supply Company, 1907, illustrated by Frank G. Cootes
- The Calling of Dan Matthews Book Supply Company, 1909
- The Uncrowned King Book Supply Company, 1910
- The Winning of Barbara Worth Book Supply Company, 1911, illustrated by Frank G. Cootes
- Their Yesterdays Book Supply Company, 1912, illustrated by Frank G. Cootes
- The Eyes of the World Book Supply Company, 1914, illustrated by Frank G. Cootes
- When a Man's a Man A. L. Burt Company, 1916
- The Re-Creation of Brian Kent Book Supply Company, 1919
- Helen of the Old House D. Appleton and Company, 1921
- The Mine with the Iron Door D. Appleton and Company, 1923
- A Son of His Father D. Appleton and Company, 1925
- God and the Groceryman D. Appleton and Company, 1927
- Long Ago Told: Legends of the Papago Indians D. Appleton and Company, 1929
- Exit D. Appleton and Company, 1930
- The Devil's Highway D. Appleton and Company, 1932
- Ma Cinderella Harper and Brothers, 1932
- To My Sons Harper and Brothers, 1934
- The Man Who Went Away Harper and Brothers, 1942

== Filmography ==
- The Eyes of the World (1917)
- The Shepherd of the Hills (1919, also director)
- When a Man's a Man (1924)
- The Mine with the Iron Door (1924)
- The Re-Creation of Brian Kent (1925)
- A Son of His Father (1925)
- The Winning of Barbara Worth (1926)
- The Shepherd of the Hills (1928)
- The Eyes of the World (1930)
- When a Man's a Man (1935)
- The Calling of Dan Matthews (1935)
- The Mine with the Iron Door (1936)
- Wild Brian Kent (1936)
- Secret Valley (1937)
- It Happened Out West (1937)
- The Californian (1937)
- Western Gold (1937)
- The Shepherd of the Hills (1941)
- Massacre River (1949, uncredited)
- The Shepherd of the Hills (1964)

== See also ==
- California Historical Landmarks in Imperial County
- California Historical Landmark
