= John P. Fulton =

John P. Fulton, A.S.C.
- Born: November 4, 1902; Beatrice, Nebraska, United States
- Died: July 5, 1966 (aged 63); Iver Heath, Buckinghamshire, London, England, UK
- Occupation: Special effects artist
- Years active: 1928–1966
- Title: A.S.C.

John P. Fulton, A.S.C. (November 1902, in Beatrice, Nebraska – July 1966, in London, England) was an American special effects supervisor and cinematographer. A three-time Academy Award winner, his work included the parting of the Red Sea scene in the 1956 film The Ten Commandments.

== Biography ==
Though Fulton began his adult life as a surveyor, he became involved in the movie industry after accepting a job as an assistant cameraman with the D. W. Griffith Company. This led to a job at the Frank D. Williams Studio in Los Angeles, where Fulton learned the basics of optical composites and traveling matte photography, which would serve him so well for the rest of his career. In time he became a camera operator and acted as cinematographer in his first official credit in 1929 with the early sound drama She Goes to War. His experiments and experience with camerawork eventually lead him to the special effects department at Universal Pictures, assisting in the special effects of the landmark horror film Frankenstein in 1931. Fulton eventually became head of the special effects department at Universal.

Fulton followed his early success as special effects supervisor with a number of memorable films, many of them of the horror film genre, including John Ford's Air Mail and The Mummy in 1932. The following year he created some of the most astounding effects of the time in The Invisible Man as well as 1935's Bride of Frankenstein. Between other film projects, he worked on the special effects for three sequels to the successful Invisible Man, and received Academy Award nominations for his work in all three films, as well as the 1940 musical The Boys from Syracuse. While on loan to Samuel Goldwyn in 1945, he earned a Special Effects Academy Award for his work in the Danny Kaye fantasy Wonder Man.

In 1953, however, after the death of Gordon Jennings, A.S.C., he became the head of the special effects department at Paramount Pictures, which led to his work on The Naked Jungle (1954), Elephant Walk (1954), Alfred Hitchcock's Rear Window (1954), Billy Wilder's Sabrina (1954), and The Bridges at Toko-Ri (1954). Fulton won his second Academy Award for The Bridges at Toko-Ri.

Fulton also became known for his collaborations with Alfred Hitchcock. Though he had worked on 1942's Saboteur, the two did not begin their frequent collaborations until 1954's Rear Window. Fulton's work for Hitchcock culminated with 1958's Vertigo. Though the film met lukewarm reception when released, it has gained almost legendary status in recent years, especially for its innovative special effects. In 1957, Fulton won his final Best Special Effects Academy Award for his work on Cecil B. DeMille's The Ten Commandments (1956), in which he parted the Red Sea, among other impressive special photographic effects.

After leaving Paramount Pictures in the early '60s, Fulton continued to work until his death in 1966. While working in Spain on Battle of Britain (1969), he contracted a rare infection and died shortly thereafter in a London hospital.

John P. Fulton's body of work includes some 250 films spanning nearly four decades. His daughter Joanne Fulton recalled his life and career in an 18-page interview in the book "A Sci-Fi Swarm and Horror Horde" (McFarland & Co., 2010) by Tom Weaver.

== Academy Awards - (Special Photographic Effects) ==
- 1940: Nominated for The Boys from Syracuse (Universal) - John P. Fulton, ASC (photographic effects)
- 1940: Nominated for The Invisible Man Returns (Universal) - John P. Fulton, ASC (photographic effects)
- 1941: Nominated for The Invisible Woman (Universal) - John P. Fulton, ASC (photographic effects)
- 1942: Nominated for Invisible Agent (Universal) - John P. Fulton, ASC (photographic effects)
- 1945: Won for Wonder Man (Goldwyn; RKO Radio) - John P. Fulton, ASC (photographic effects)
- 1949: Nominated for Tulsa (Walter Wanger Pictures) - John P. Fulton, ASC (photographic effects)
- 1955: Won for The Bridges at Toko-Ri (Paramount) - John P. Fulton, ASC (photographic effects)
- 1956: Won for The Ten Commandments (DeMille; Paramount) - John P. Fulton, ASC (photographic effects)
