= The Shepherd of the Hills (1928 film) =

1928 silent film

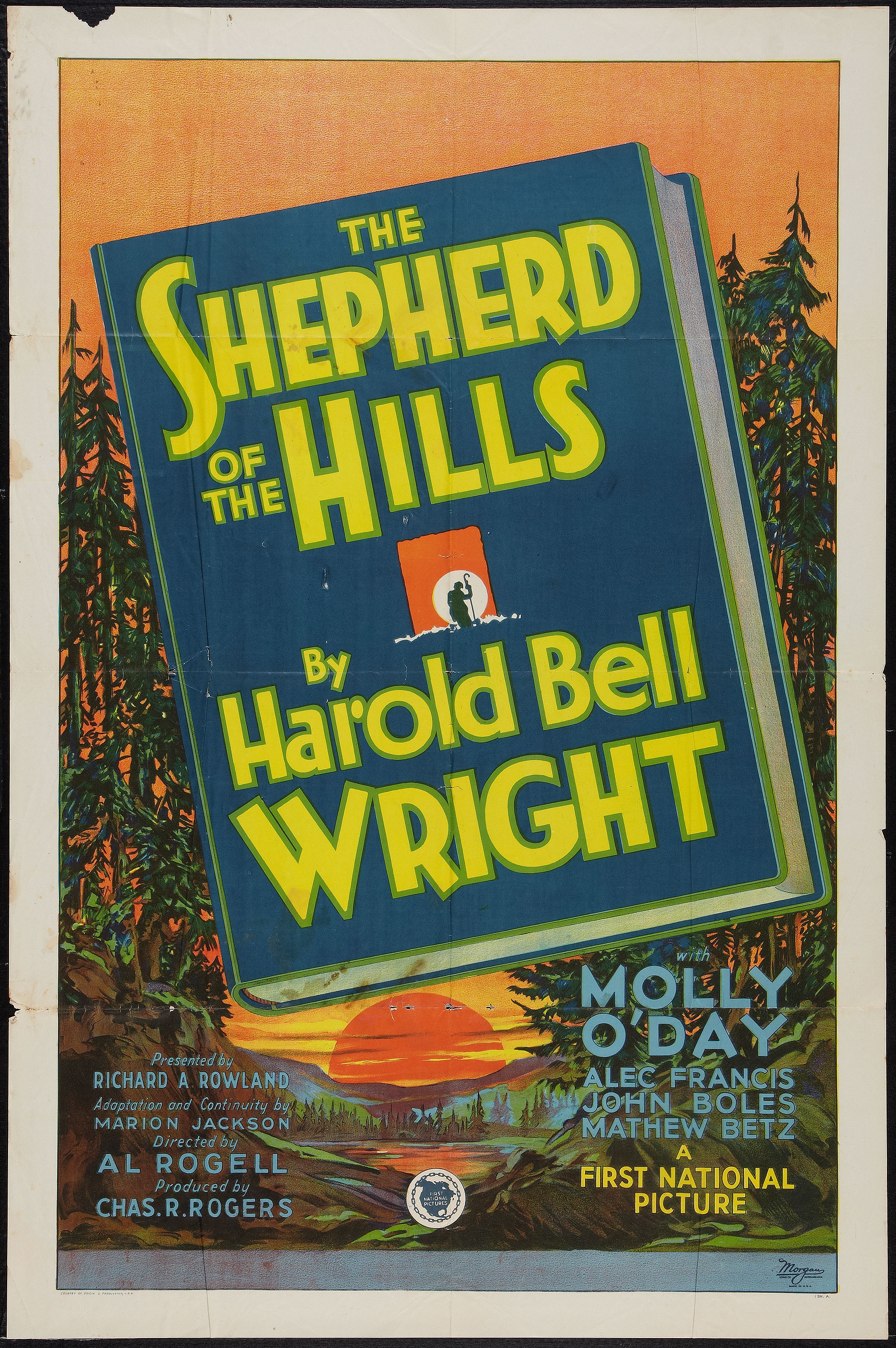
- Film poster with novel
- Directed by: Albert S. Rogell
- Written by: Dwinelle Benthall; Marion Jackson; Rufus McCosh
- Based on: The Shepherd of the Hills by Harold Bell Wright
- Produced by: Charles R. Rogers; Richard A. Rowland
- Starring: Alec B. Francis; Molly O'Day; John Boles
- Cinematography: Sol Polito
- Edited by: Hugh Bennett
- Production company: First National Pictures
- Distributed by: First National Pictures
- Release date: January 1, 1928
- Running time: 90 minutes
- Country: United States
- Language: Silent (English intertitles)

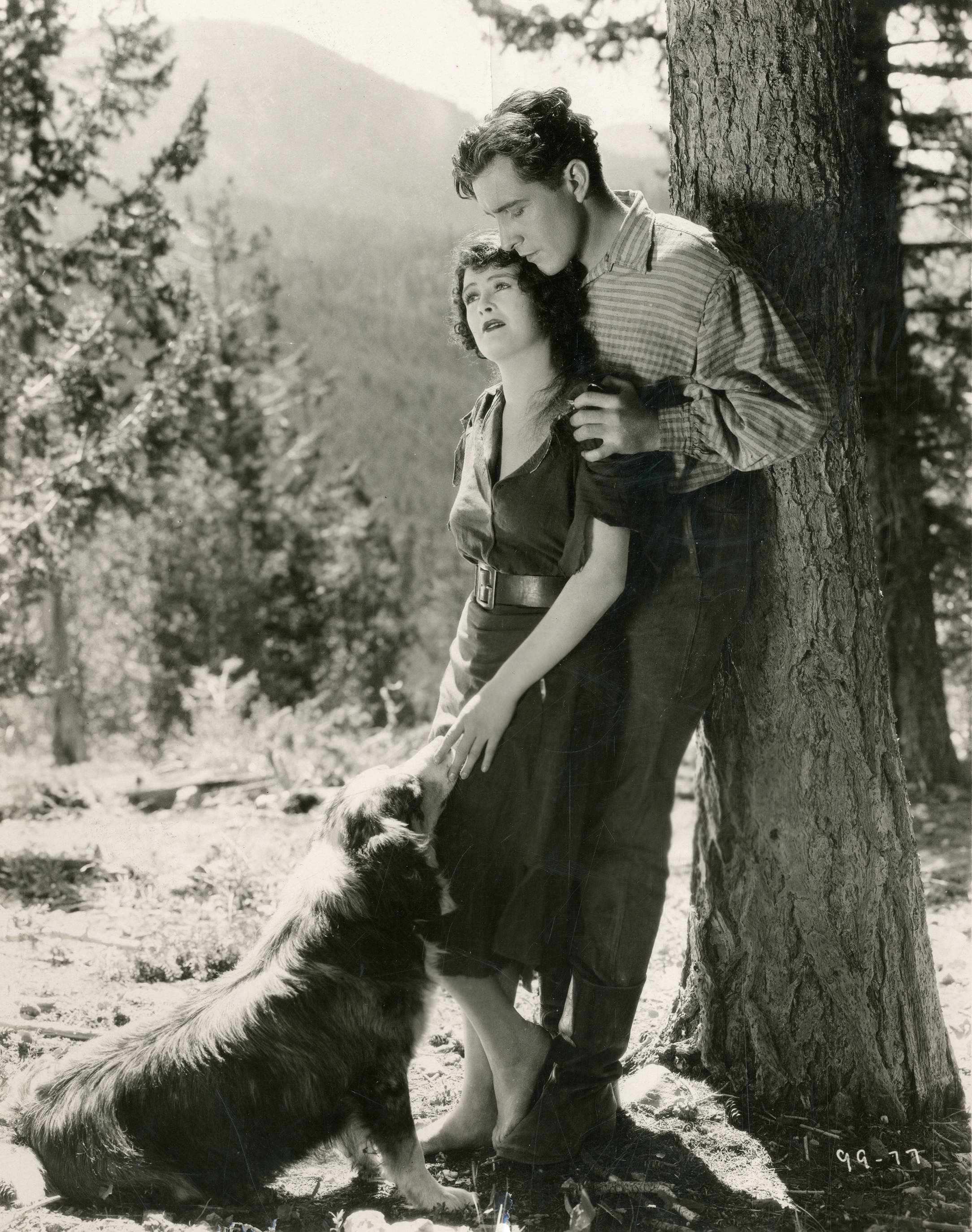
Molly O'Day and John Boles, 1927

The Shepherd of the Hills is a 1928 American silent drama film directed by Albert S. Rogell and starring Alec B. Francis, Molly O'Day, and John Boles.

== Cast ==
- Alec B. Francis as David Howitt, The Shepherd
- Molly O'Day as Sammy Lane
- John Boles as Young Matt
- Matthew Betz as Wash Gibbs
- Romaine Fielding as Old Matt
- Otis Harlan as By Thunder
- Joseph Bennett as Ollie
- Maurice Murphy as Little Pete
- Edythe Chapman as Aunt Mollie
- Carl Stockdale as Jim Lane
- Ena Gregory as Maggie
- John Westwood as The Artist

== Production ==
The Shepherd of the Hills was filmed on location in southern Utah.

== Preservation ==
With no prints of The Shepherd of the Hills located in any film archives, it is a lost film.

== Bibliography ==
- Munden, Kenneth White. The American Film Institute Catalog of Motion Pictures Produced in the United States, Part 1. University of California Press, 1997.
