= The Shepherd of the Hills (novel) =

1907 novel by Harold Bell Wright

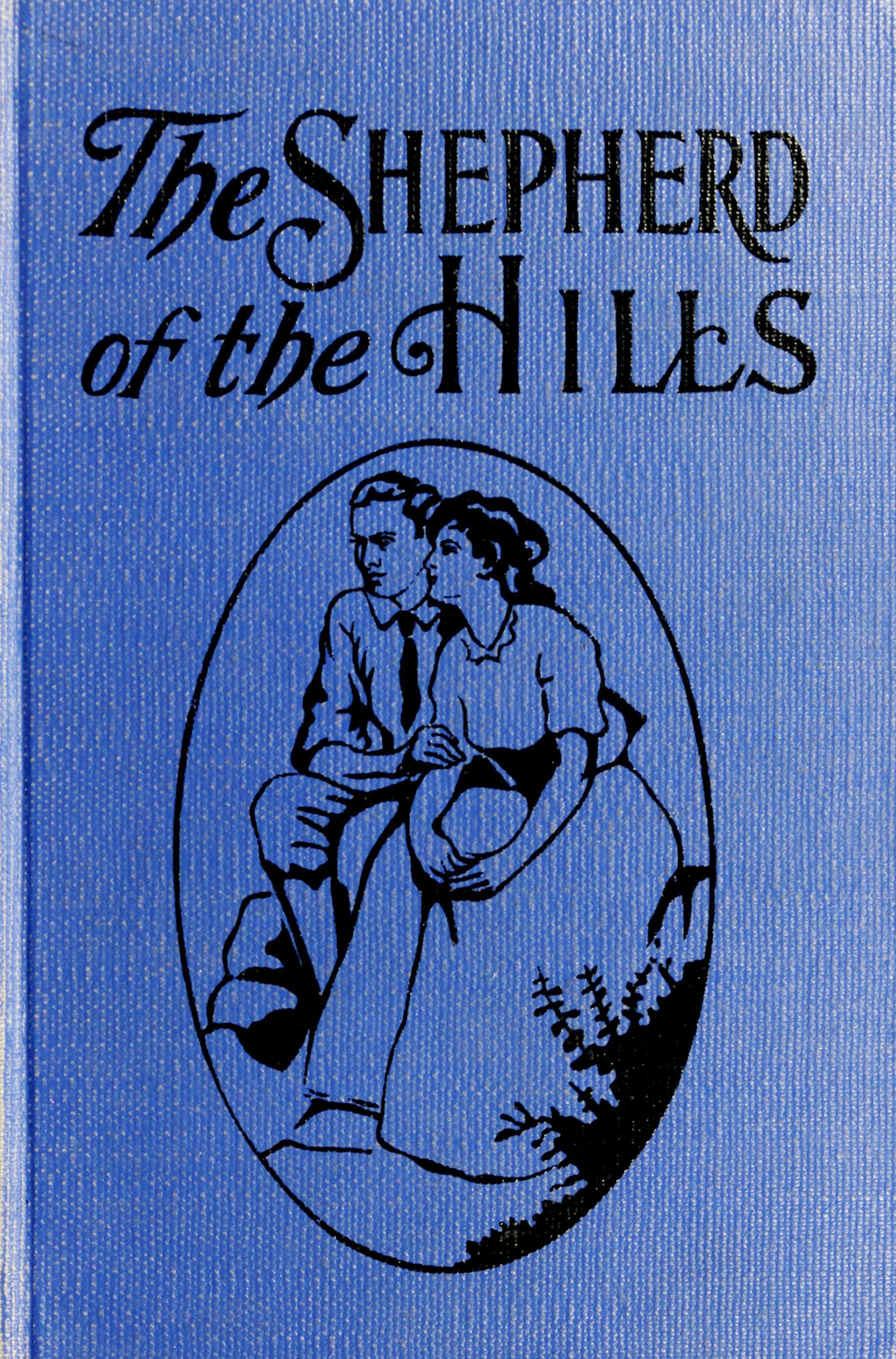
- First edition cover
- Author: Harold Bell Wright
- Illustrator: Frank G. Cootes
- Cover artist: Frank G. Cootes
- Language: English
- Published: 1907
- Publisher: A. L. Burt
- Publication place: United States
- Media type: Print

The Shepherd of the Hills is a book written in 1907 by author Harold Bell Wright and illustrated by Frank G. Cootes. It depicts a mostly fictional story of mountain folklore and forgiveness, and has been translated into seven languages since its release.

== History ==
Wright began visiting the Ozark Mountains in southern Missouri and northern Arkansas in 1898 at the bidding of his physician, who recommended two vacations a year in a more suitable climate for health reasons. In following his doctor's advice, he became acquainted with John and Anna Ross, who would later become known locally as Old Matt and Aunt Mollie. The people he encountered during his eight summers spent camping on the Rosses' land were the inspirations for his characters in the book.

== Plot summary ==
The story depicts the lives of mountain people living in the Ozarks.

The main story surrounds the relationship between Grant "Old Matt" Matthews Senior and Dad Howitt, an elderly, mysterious, learned man who has escaped the buzzing restlessness of the city to live in the backwoods neighborhood of Mutton Hollow. Howitt spends his time alone, acting as a mediator and friend to the mountain people, and trying to recover from his tragic past, which includes the prior deaths of his wife and children, and the later presumed madness and subsequent suicide of his only surviving child, his artist son (later referred to as "Mad Howard").

Howitt's reclusiveness has earned him the moniker "The Shepherd of The Hills", yet he befriends the Matthews clan (the strongest and most respected family in the area), who come to love and trust him. Old Matt and the Shepherd's common history (which only The Shepherd knows at the outset) involves Old Matt's daughter, who died while giving birth to her son (and Old Matt's grandson), Pete Howard: unbeknownst to the Matthews, Mad Howard is Pete's father, and thus The Shepherd is Pete's grandfather.

Years earlier, Mad Howard returned home after spending time painting in the mountains, and one of his paintings became famous, as did he. That painting was of a young girl, pretty, standing beside a creek; the girl in the painting was Old Matt's daughter, with whom he had fallen in love. However, Mad Howard believed that his father's pride of family and place in society would never allow him to approve of his son's marriage to an Ozark country girl. Mad Howard packed up his paintings and returned to the city, leaving Old Matt's daughter with the impression that he would return. Once returning to the city, Mad Howard sent her a letter explaining that his father would not approve of their marriage. However, he never told his father about Old Matt's daughter and his relations with her; the secrecy drove a wedge between Mad Howard and his father, although his father never understood why. Meanwhile, Old Matt has sworn he will kill the man who abandoned his daughter, as well as his father, if ever he finds them.

Over the years, Mad Howard's love for Old Matt's daughter and his guilt over abandoning her slowly drove him insane. Eventually, Mad Howard feigns suicide and leaves behind his city life. He goes to the Ozarks and learns that Old Matt's daughter is dead, but that she has a son who (like his father) suffers from mental instability. Mad Howard hides in the woods, living like a hermit, trying to atone for the wrongs he has done. Mad Howard is portrayed throughout the story as a ghostly person, masked and always hiding in the shadows, who reveals himself only to Pete (as a result, Pete is also believed to have some mental instability).

The Shepherd is suffering a mental breakdown of his own over the presumed death of his son. Though The Shepherd is a pastor, he realizes that he has no true belief in the Good Shepherd he preaches to others; this crisis of faith pushes him over the edge. His doctor recommends he take a long vacation, so he spends some time wandering around the country, rediscovering and strengthening his faith. Eventually, he changes his name and moves to the hills to connect with what his son loved most. Here he finally learns of his son's secret, the subsequent death of the Matthews girl, and the identity of young Pete as his grandson. He keeps this and his true identity from everyone, knowing that Old Matt has sworn vengeance. The Shepherd also hopes to do what he can to atone for his son's actions and intends to spend the rest of his life helping these people and teaching them about the "true Shepherd".

Only later in the story does The Shepherd discover that the ghostly figure is his son Mad Howard. Shortly afterwards, Mad Howard is shot while risking his life to save others. The Shepherd then confesses his identity to Old Matt and tells him that the betrayer of his daughter is still alive, but dying and desires to be forgiven. After The Shepherd's confession Old Matt, although angry, finds it within himself to forgive both father and son, and he and the Shepherd (along with his wife and Pete) go to Mad Howard's bedside.

With the doctor and family present, Mad Howard looks at the painting of the Matthews girl. He speaks to her of their life together, saying, "I loved her, I--LOVED--HER. She was my natural mate. My other self. I belonged to her, she to me." For a time he lies exhausted; then he rises on his arms and says, "Do you hear her? She is calling. She is calling again! Yes, sweetheart. Yes, dear, I am coming!" With that, Mad Howard dies and is buried in an unmarked section of a cave on Dewey Bald. Shortly thereafter, Pete also dies and is buried next to his mother.

A backdrop storyline surrounds the pretty Samantha "Sammy" Lane and her love of Grant "Young Matt" Matthews Jr. Young Matt is in love with Sammy, who is also being courted by two other men: Ollie Stewart (a "city slicker" who at the outset appears to have the inside track, but Sammy decides that she doesn't want to move to the city) and Wash Gibbs (leader of the Baldknobbers, a gang who terrorize the countryside wearing frightening masks with horns at their top and who rob banks and settlers as they see fit). Gibbs (whose father and Sammy's father Jim were involved with the Baldknobbers in the past) is jealous of Young Matt, and during the story kills Jim after he refuses to go along with one of the Baldknobbers' schemes (it is during this episode that Mad Howard is shot by a posse mistaking him for one of the Baldknobbers). Eventually, Sammy and Young Matt marry and have children of their own.

The last chapter of the story skips ahead many years to an artist wandering through the mountains, looking for inspiration. He meets The Shepherd, and the two men converse casually for a time. The Shepherd notes that the mountains will eventually become "the haunt of curious idlers" once the railroad comes, but he will not be alive by then. For a few days they see one another regularly, conversing, and one day The Shepherd invites the artist to his home where the artist meets Sammy and Young Matt and their family. Inside, the artist takes special note of how nicely decorated the home is, and he is especially interested in one room, where paintings of good quality are hanging. He notices that the largest painting is veiled, hiding its content. The Shepherd never offers to show the young artist that painting, and the young artist does not ask to see it, but remains curious.

The artist leaves the mountains, but returns the following summer. He is greeted by Young Matt and Sammy, and discovers that The Shepherd's prediction had come true – the railroad was blasting away nearby mountains, but he had died while the surveyors were in the area before construction had started (and was buried at Dewey Bald). It was then that, as requested by The Shepherd, the veiled painting is revealed to the young artist, who then becomes excited, knowing it immediately as Mad Howard's famous lost painting (though not revealed in the story, it is implied that it is the painting of Old Matt's daughter). The young artist asks excitedly, "How – where did you find it?" They enter another room, as Young Matt and Sammy begin re-telling the story of The Shepherd of The Hills.

== Other portrayals ==
The novel has been the basis for four films, the first in 1919, and a television movie. The best-known version is the 1941 film of the same name starring Harry Carey and John Wayne.

The Shepherd of the Hills is a popular outdoor drama staged from May to October, from 1960 until what was initially announced as its final performance on October 19, 2013, in Branson, Missouri. However, the play was brought back the next year with a reduced performance schedule beginning on May 23, 2014. The outdoor play features more than eighty actors, forty horses, and an actual nightly burning of the cabin.

In July 2017 new owners were announced as Jeff Johnson and Steve Faria purchased the property from the Snadon family and had a press conference to announce their plans to continue the play and turn the 177 acre property into the Shepherd of the Hills Homestead Adventure Park.

William L. Reese, I, became acquainted with Harold Bell Wright in Pittsburg, Kansas, through the Disciples of Christ. While working on Shepherd of the Hills, Wright became disenchanted with his manuscript, opened the door to a potbelly stove, and tossed it into the blaze. Reese hastily proceeded to rescue the manuscript.

The model for Uncle Ike's Post Office was listed on the National Register of Historic Places in 1979 as the Levi Morrill Post Office and Homestead.
