= The Adventure Girls =

Novel series by Clair Blank

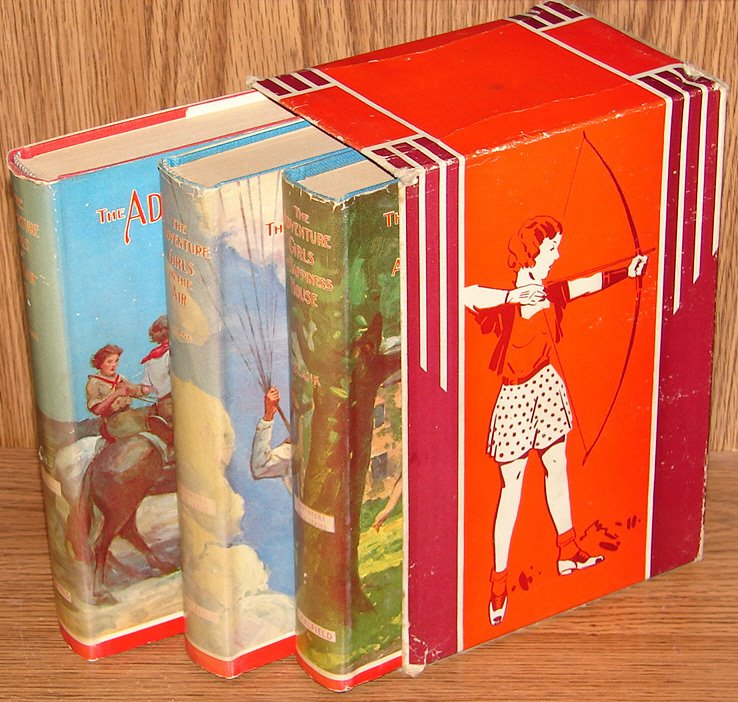
- Box set of Saalfield editions—the second publisher for the series—in their earlier (taller) format
- The Adventure Girls at K Bar O; The Adventure Girls in the Air; The Adventure Girls at Happiness House
- Author: Clair Blank
- Country: United States
- Language: English
- Genre: Juvenile literature
- Publisher: A. L. Burt; Saalfield
- Published: 1936
- Media type: Print (hardback)

The Adventure Girls is a book trilogy written by Clair Blank and published in 1936. A children's series, the books chronicle the six titular girls on summer vacation before their senior year of high school, during their senior year, and during their first year of college. The series was published two years after the first volumes in Blank's Beverly Gray series, which ran to 26 titles between 1934 and 1955, and for which she is best known.

The first book, The Adventure Girls at K Bar O, follows the girls during a summer at a ranch owned by one of their uncles; he has been targeted by cattle rustlers, whom the girls help capture. The second book, The Adventure Girls in the Air, sees the girls both help a young inventor save his new plane from rivals, and also rescue one of their company after she is in a plane crash and develops amnesia. The final book, The Adventure Girls at Happiness House, involves a new dean who is targeted by an unknown person, and one of the girls breaking her leg badly, and then discovering that her unknown father is a celebrated surgeon.

The series was published by A. L. Burt, Blank's initial publisher for the Beverly Gray series. After Burt was acquired in 1937, however, the Beverly Gray series ended up with Grosset & Dunlap, which continued the series, while The Adventure Girls ended up with Saalfield, a reprint specialist without the resources to commission new books. The series was therefore ended; a fourth book, The Adventure Girls on Vacation, was advertised at the end of the third but never published.

== Clair Blank ==
Clarissa Mabel Blank is best known as the author of the 26-volume Beverly Gray series, which ran from 1934 to 1955. Born on August 5, 1915, she began writing that series while still in high school, and saw the four-volume "breeder set" published when she was 18 years old. (Note: Breeder sets were a common tactic when issuing new series books, including with the Stratemeyer Syndicate: The first three or so would be published simultaneously in order to gauge reaction and build audience. Depending on the results, the series would (or would not) be continued.) The first eight volumes of that series were published by A. L. Burt, then reprinted by Blue Ribbon Books after its acquisition of Burt in March 1937. The following seventeen were published by Grosset & Dunlap, which purchased the series in 1938, and the final book by Clover Books, an imprint of McLoughlin Brothers, which was purchased by Grosset & Dunlap in 1954. Blank published one additional book, the adult novel Lover Come Back, in 1940.

Outside of her writing, Blank was a typist and then secretary in Philadelphia for the Keystone Pipeline Company, a subsidiary of the Atlantic Refining Company. She left the company in 1946 to focus on raising her sons and writing. Blank died of cancer in 1965, at the age of 50.

== Books ==
#	Title	Copyright
1*	The Adventure Girls at K Bar O	1936
2	The Adventure Girls in the Air	1936
3	The Adventure Girls at Happiness House	1936
4^{†}	(The Adventure Girls on Vacation)	N/A

* Errantly referred to as "K-Bar-O" on the dust jacket

^{†} Advertised by name at the end of the third book, but never published

=== The Adventure Girls at K Bar O ===
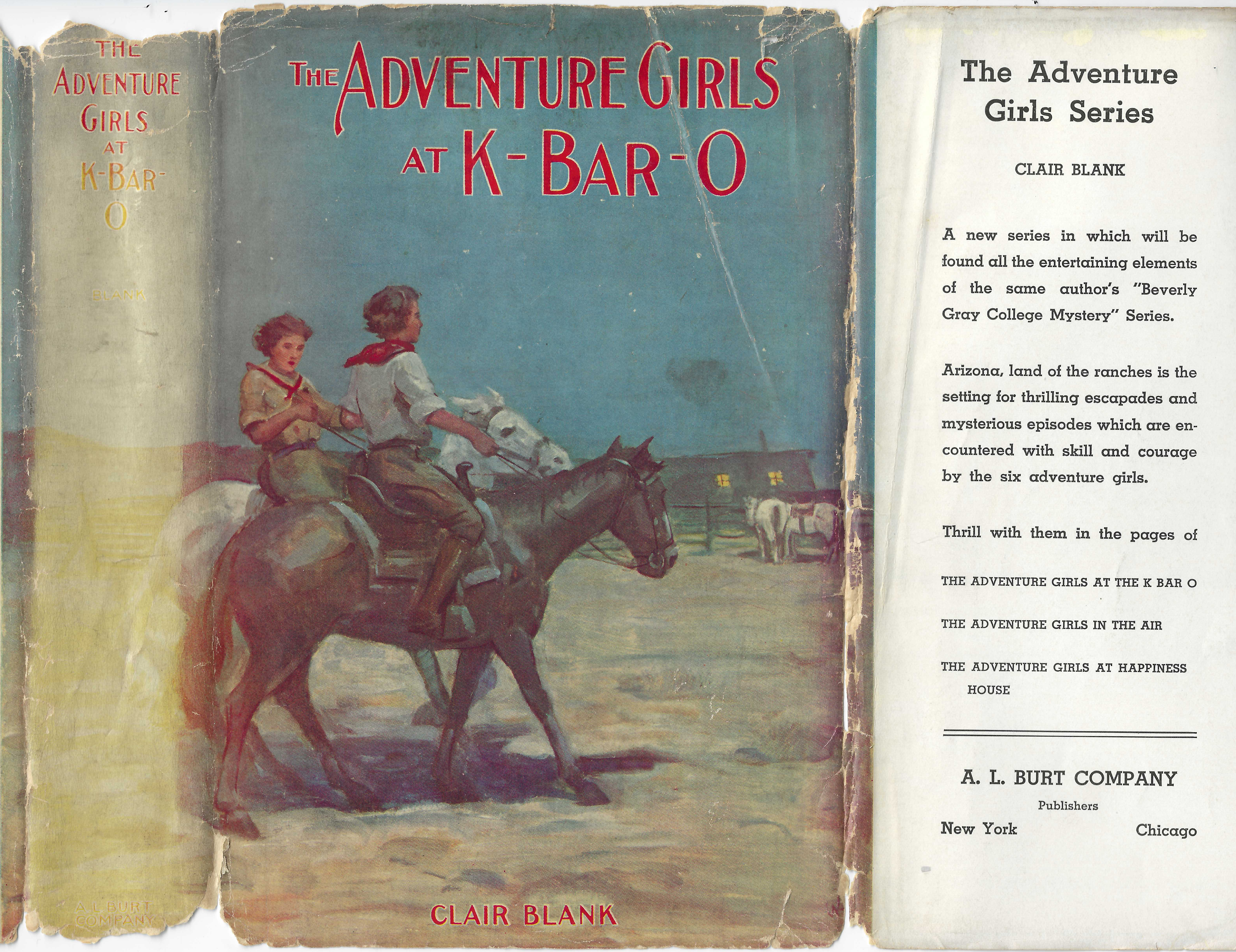
"The cabin where she was to do her spying stood squarely in the center of a large patch of moonlight"; depicts gale approaching a cabin housing cattle rustlers in chapter 13

The Adventure Girls at K Bar O introduces the six titular heroines: Gale Howard, Carol Carter, Janet Gordon, Phyllis Elton, Madge Reynolds, and Valerie Wallace. The girls are rising seniors at Marchton High School; Marchton is described as "a little town near the Atlantic Ocean", and the following book clarifies that it is "a small but busy little town in Maine, bordering the rocky coast". The girls arrive at the K Bar O Ranch in northern Arizona at the invitation of Gale's cousin, Virginia Wilson. Virginia's father owns the cattle ranch, described as "one of the biggest in the state". A weeks-long camping trip on horseback pits the girls, along with Virginia's older brother Tom and ranch hand Jim, against a band of rustlers that have driven Mr. Wilson close to the point of ruin.

Scenery combines with adventure in K Bar O, but usually takes a back seat. Chapter nine sees the girls tour the Colorado River and Grand Canyon, the Petrified Forest, the Painted Desert, Monument Valley (and "El Capitan" therein), and the ruins of the Betatakin cliff dwellings. Throughout the rest of the book, various assemblages of girls foil a bank robbery; get uncomfortably close to a rattlesnake; get lost in a cave with the (recently escaped) bandits; narrowly avoid being crushed by a boulder; get kidnapped; exchange gunshots with a bandit during escape from said kidnapping; rope and kill an attacking cougar; get kidnapped again; survive a ride on a runaway horse; get kidnapped for a third time after the bandits escape for a second time; and avoid another bullet. Tom is not quite as lucky, getting shot in the arm as he and the cook, Loo Wong, capture the bandits for the third and final time. For their efforts the Adventure Girls are awarded $1,000 by the sheriff. This is promptly bestowed upon Bobby, a destitute boy of around eight, such that he can pursue a formal education. Adventures concluded, the girls depart back East.

=== The Adventure Girls in the Air ===
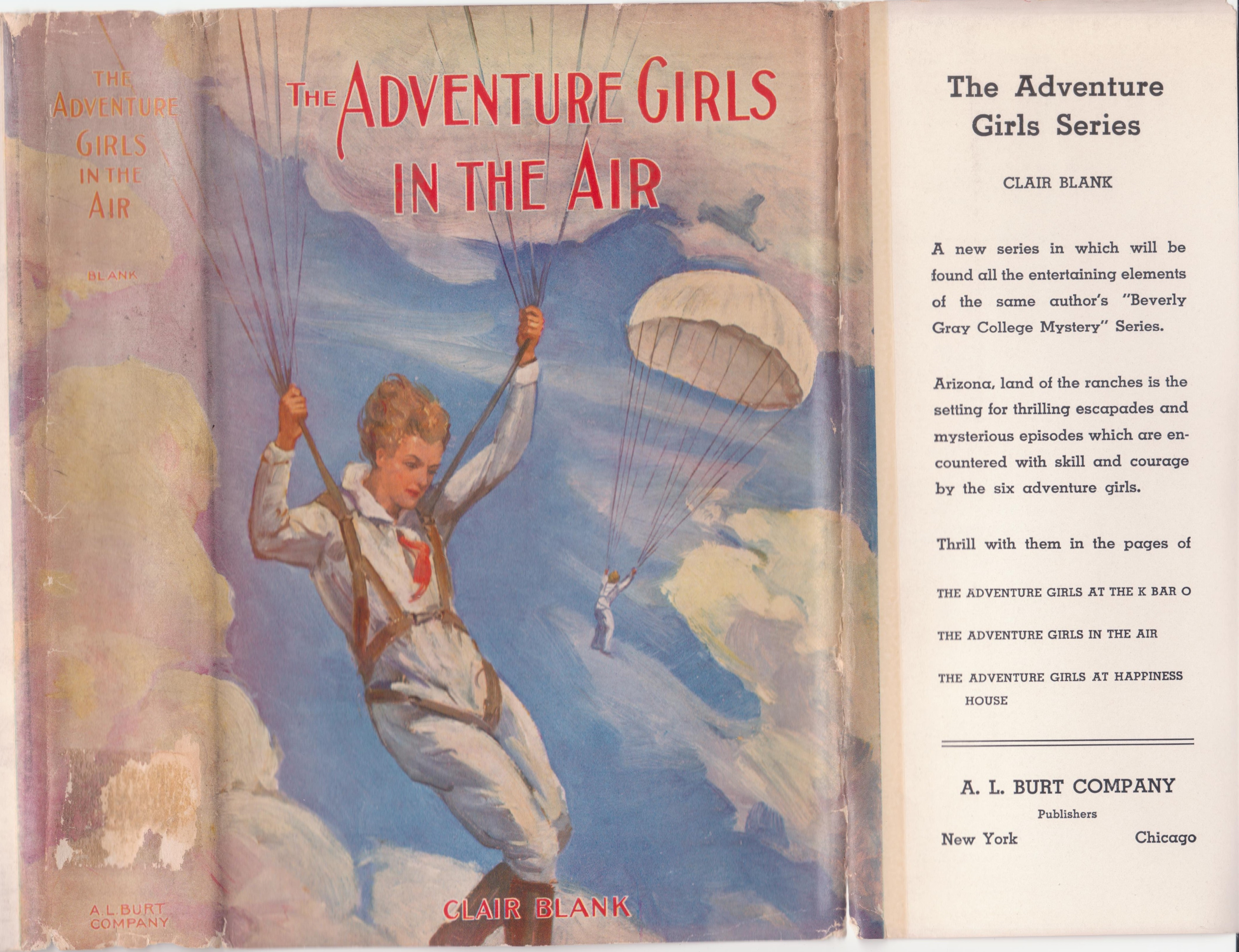
"Phyllis' parachute came free and straightened out with a jerk"; depicts a parachute competition preceding the airplane race in chapter 9, when the cords of Janet and Phyllis get tangled

The Adventure Girls in the Air picks up with the six girls in their senior year. The book involves two distinct narrative arcs. The first nine chapters involve the attempt by Brent Stockton, a pilot and inventor aged about twenty-three, to perfect a new airplane motor, and the attempts by enemies to steal his designs. Chapters ten through sixteen detail a plane crash resulting in Gale's disappearance, amnesia, and rediscovery. The book then concludes with five chapters narrating the end of the school year and preparations for college.

The novel opens on the beach, where the girls and three male companions—Bruce Latimer, David Kimball, and Peter Arnold—watch a red monoplane doing aerobatics above the Atlantic Ocean. After it crashes on nearby Cloudy Island, Gale, Phyllis and Bruce rush over; the pilot, who has a sprained ankle, turns out to be Brent, who is developing an airplane motor that will be "the most practical and economical as well as fastest". An unknown competitor has attempted three times to steal Brent's plans, including "a bold attempt on his life." In the following chapters Bruce is punched, the airplane hangar is subject to a bomb attempt, and two men stage an armed break-in. Brent's plane nevertheless wins a race, setting him up to sell his patent to the United States government and accept a job in Washington, D.C., with the Transcontinental Air Line Company.

The second narrative arc begins when Brent flies Gale and her father, a successful lawyer, to visit a client in Quebec. Gale and Brent return the next day while Mr. Howard stays behind for another night. Brent forgets to fill up on gas, and crashes in the woods. He leaves to get help for a trapped and unconscious Gale, who develops amnesia. She is discovered and taken in by François and Antoinette Bouchard, French Canadian siblings living in a small farmhouse in the woods. While Gale's friends search frantically for her, the Bouchards are unable to alert the world to her presence. As François explains it, "I injured my foot [splitting logs], and I have not been able to go to the village to notify the authorities. My sister knows very little about such things." Gale's friends eventually discover her, but, because she does not recognize them and refuses to return with them, this still leaves time for her to spend a night lost in the woods and have her memory restored by a fall off a 20-foot cliff. Once back in Marchton, Gale accepts Brent's proposal at Senior Prom, and the girls trick Phyllis's domineering aunt into allowing Phyllis to attend college at Briarhurst with the other five. The next chapter sees Gale and Bruce trapped on Cloudy Island during a storm (dodging a falling lightning-struck tree and falling into the stormy waters in the process). (Note: Some copies of the book are bound without the final chapter and thus end here, with Gale and Bruce awaiting rescue.) The book ends the day after graduation, with the girls looking forward to Briarhurst.

=== The Adventure Girls at Happiness House ===
The Adventure Girls at Happiness House finds the six girls at Briarhurst College, where they have just arrived to begin their first year. The main plot revolves around the efforts of an unknown person to hurt or possibly kill the college's new dean. A subplot centers on Phyllis, who breaks her leg and needs an operation to be able to walk again, and on her unknown father, who is discovered to be a famous surgeon. The book's title refers to the name of the Omega Chi sorority house where Gale and Phyllis live.

Dean Travis is an unpopular force on campus, particularly amongst those who enjoyed "special privileges" under the old dean. In chapter 2, Gale saves the dean from going over a waterfall after her canoe's rope is cut and the boat set adrift. Chapter 4 sees the dean sent poisoned candy, have her curtains set on fire, and, with Gale, narrowly avoid a vial of acid tossed from a window. Two chapters later, college funds are stolen from the safe and a typewritten note slipped under Gale's door warns "Do not interfere in affairs that are none of your concern". Gale then sees a suspicious-looking man on campus, turns "all the girls into Sherlock Holmeses" to find the typewriter used for the note, and finds her room ransacked. The culprit is unmasked in chapter 14, when Gale oversees the dean's secretary, Miss Horton, take a vial from the chemistry laboratory, pour it into the dean's water glass, and then have a phone call in which she says that "Sarah—you will be Dean of Briarhurst someday". The secretary confesses, stating that she was trying to help her sister obtain the deanship. The money, she says, she took but intended to return; the identity of the man on campus remains unresolved, but the girls assume he was working with the secretary. The dean tells her that the matter will be forgotten if she returns the money and leaves that night.

The subplot begins in chapter 5, when Phyllis breaks her leg playing field hockey; five weeks later, the same leg is crushed when she saves Gale and the dean from a falling pile of lumber in an apparent accident. The doctor declares that Phyllis needs an operation by "the best [surgeon] in the East" to again walk properly. Phyllis's aunt, described as "aloof", "stern," and "a female Simon Legree", initially and without explanation refuses to help. Finally, however, Miss Fields relents, divulging that she is not truly Phyllis's aunt. In "a story as incredible and fantastic as any fiction", she reveals that Phyllis is actually the daughter of the celebrated surgeon Doctor Philip Elton, for whom Miss Fields served as secretary. After Phyllis's mother died in a railroad accident, the grief-stricken doctor left for Europe to study surgery, and bade his secretary take care of Phyllis; upon his return Miss Fields, now attached to Phyllis and afraid of losing her, fled. Her mean demeanor, she said, was out of fear that Phyllis would make friends, and the truth would be uncovered. In the next chapter, the girls overhear a radio bulletin: "Flash! An unconfirmed report has just been received that Doctor Philip Elton, the world renowned surgeon, is lost in the jungles of Brazil. Doctor Elton sailed from Liverpool, England, a month ago for a vacation cruise on his yacht, the Tornado." Brent Stockton and the girls' hometown friend, David Kimball, fly to Brazil to join a search party organized by the "South American government"; a few pages later, the doctor is found. He flies to Briarhurst, operates on Phyllis's leg, and familial harmony is restored.

The final chapters relate the more day-to-day aspects of life at Briarhurst College. Janet is thrown from a horse, Gale pretends to drown to coax Phyllis from her wheelchair, and Phyllis rescues horses from a burning stable, collapses, and is rescued in turn by Gale. The final chapter sees the girls after their final classes discussing summer plans, for which Doctor Elton has offered the use of his yacht. No fourth book was ever published, but The Adventure Girls at Happiness House closes with a promise for more adventure:

"Suppose we leave the Adventure Girls here, discussing their plans for the summer. We shall join them again for more excitement in The Adventure Girls on Vacation."

== Publication history ==
Close to two years after A. L. Burt published the first four Beverly Gray books, Blank submitted the manuscript of The Adventure Girls at K Bar O to her publisher. Edwin van Deventer of the company responded with enthusiasm on January 17, 1936. Around a week later he informed Blank that the publisher's reader enjoyed the manuscript, and "thought a series of this nature would be a good one to add to our list"; he therefore asked "how soon could we have two additional stories to add to the present one". Blank wrote the following two novels extremely quickly: van Deventer reported on in the Air on February 11, and Happiness House on March 16. Quoting his reader, he wrote that in the Air was "an absorbingly interesting story, and especially delightful [is] the description of life in the Canadian woods". Happiness House, for its part, his reader found "a very suitable narrative for girls. Although the action slows down at times, it maintains interest and has sufficient number of exciting events to make it interesting as well as mysterious." Van Deventer wrote that the books were targeted "for early spring publication". They were copyrighted the next month, on April 27, 1936, when Blank was 20 years old, and issued as a three-part breeder set. Blank was paid a flat fee of $150 per manuscript, earning no royalties.

Although the Beverly Gray series would see a book issued in 1937 by A. L. Burt, The Adventure Girls was never continued. In March 1937 A. L. Burt was sold to Blue Ribbon Books, and on June 2, 1938, Blue Ribbon Books wrote Blank to inform her that "We have just concluded negotiations to sell our entire juvenile business to the firm of Grosset & Dunlap." Somewhere along the way The Adventure Girls was dropped; its rights never made it to Grosset & Dunlap, but were instead sold to Saalfield, a small Ohio-based reprint specialist without the means to commission new works. Saalfield left the series idle, perhaps not even reprinting the existing three titles until the fall of 1942.

Blank wrote to Saalfield in March 1942, stating "It has been several years since you took over the girls' juvenile series 'The Adventure Girls' when the A. L. Burt Company, of New York, disbanded, and during that time the series has been left idle. It is my desire to know whether or not you intend to do anything with the series in the future or if they are for sale to any other publisher." Saalfield responded with plans to publish the three titles "this fall", but declined Blank's request for a fourth volume: "We are not in the market for new material at this time, but should we desire to bring out any additional titles in this series we shall be happy to get in touch with you." Although the three original works were reprinted over the years, The Adventure Girls never saw any additional titles published. None of the books had their copyright renewed, and thus passed into the public domain.

== Formats ==
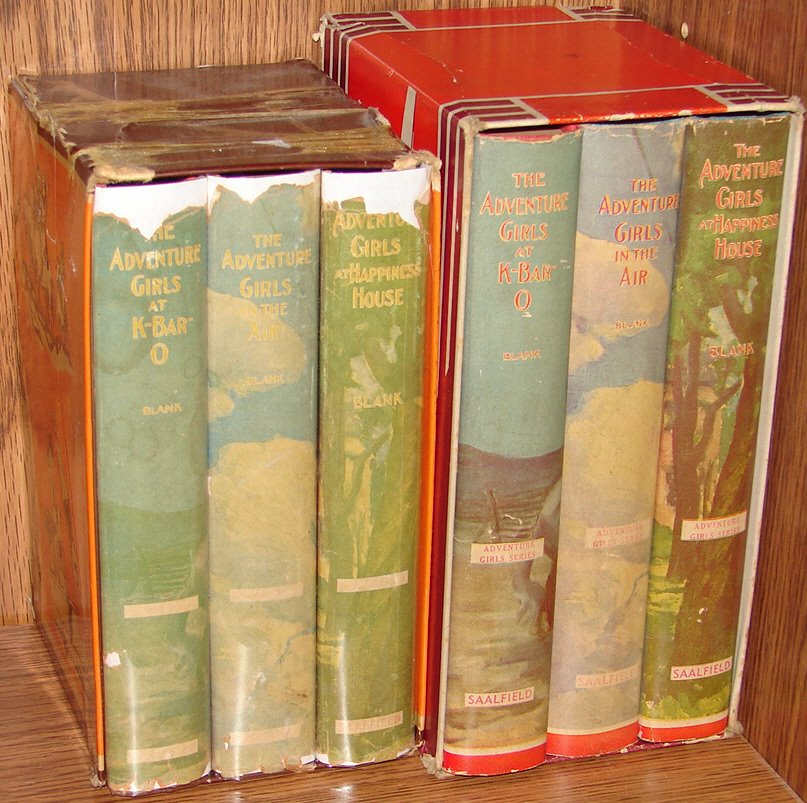
Saalfield box sets in different formats

The Adventure Girls books were published by both A. L. Burt and Saalfield, and accordingly were issued in multiple formats. Under A. L. Burt, the books were thick green hardcovers, approximately eight inches in height; the black and white glossy frontispieces copied the illustrations on the dust jackets. When republished by Saalfield, the books initially kept the same height, but were issued with boards of different colors, such as blue, green, or red, and with poor quality paper. The frontispieces, no longer glossy, were given line drawn renderings of the dust jacket illustrations. At some point the books were printed approximately an inch shorter, while Saalfield occasionally issued the books in cardboard box sets.

== Bibliography ==
- Abreu, John E. (May–June 1984a). "Beverly Gray: Junior Soap, A Golden Anniversary Retrospective (part 1)". Yellowback Library (21): 3–8. OCLC 8523968.
- Abreu, John E. (July–August 1984b). "Beverly Gray: Junior Soap, A Golden Anniversary Retrospective (part 2)". Yellowback Library (22): 5–10. OCLC 8523968.
- Blank, Clair (1936). The Adventure Girls at K Bar O. New York: A. L. Burt Company.
- Blank, Clair (1936). The Adventure Girls in the Air. New York: A. L. Burt Company.
- Blank, Clair (1936). The Adventure Girls at Happiness House. New York: A. L. Burt Company.
- Grossman, Anita Susan (January 1989a). "The Mystery of Clair Blank". Yellowback Library (55): 5–14. OCLC 8523968.
- Grossman, Anita Susan (January 1989b). "Clair Blank and Her Publishers: A Look at the Written Record". Yellowback Library (66): 5–15. OCLC 8523968.
- Grossman, Anita Susan (October 1998). "Lover Come Back: A Synopsis of Clair Blank's Forgotten Novel". The Whispered Watchword (98–10): 20–27. OCLC 1114933237.
- Grossman, Anita Susan (April 1994). "A Note on McLoughlin Brothers and Clover Books". Yellowback Library (118): 12. OCLC 1114933237.
- Keeline, James D. (12 October 2022). "A". The Series Book Encyclopedia: A Bio-Bibliographical Dictionary of Twentieth Century Series Fiction for Boys and Girls with special emphasis on Stratemeyer Syndicate series and those most collected today (PDF). Pre-publication draft. pp. 1–46. Archived (PDF) from the original on 6 November 2026.
- Lange, Brenda (2004). Edward Stratemeyer: Creator of the Hardy boys and Nancy Drew. Who Wrote That?. Philadelphia: Chelsea House Publishers. ISBN 0-7910-7621-0.
- Library of Congress Copyright Office (1937). Catalog of Copyright Entries, Part 1: Books, Group 1. New Series. Vol. 33. Washington, D.C.: United States Government Printing Office.
- The Society of Phantom Friends (2006). The Girls' Series Companion (2006 ed.). Rheem Valley, California: SynSine Press. ISBN 1-891388-07-X.
