= Otwell =

Otwell may refer to:

- Otwell, Indiana
- Otwell (Oxford, Maryland). a historic home
- Otwell Johnson, 16-century English merchant
- The Otwell Twins, an American singing duo

== See also ==
- Ottwell Binns (1872–1935), British novelist and Unitarian minister
- Ottewell (disambiguation)
