= Ben Bolt (disambiguation) =

"Ben Bolt" is a poem by Thomas Dunn English.

Ben Bolt may also refer to:

- Ben Bolt, Texas
- Big Ben Bolt, comic strip
- Ben Bolt (director), director of The Big Town (1987)
- Ben Bolt, pen name of Ottwell Binns (1872–1935), British novelist and Unitarian minister
