= Clair Blank =

American novelist (1915–1965)

- Blank c. 1933
- Born: Clarissa Mabel Blank; August 5, 1915; Allentown, Pennsylvania, U.S.
- Died: August 15, 1965 (aged 50); Philadelphia, Pennsylvania, U.S.
- Education: Peirce College
- Occupation: Novelist
- Writing career
- Genre: Juvenile fiction

Clarissa Mabel Blank (August 5, 1915 – August 15, 1965) was an American novelist. She wrote the 26-volume Beverly Gray mystery series from 1934 to 1955, the three-volume The Adventure Girls series in 1936, and the adult-oriented novel Lover Come Back in 1940.

Blank was born in Allentown, Pennsylvania, then moved to Philadelphia, where she graduated from Olney High School with honors. She began writing the Beverly Gray books while still in high school; they were accepted by the publisher A. L. Burt and published around May 1934, when Blank was 18. She wrote two more books in the series the following year, and then one each year thereafter, until the series was cancelled in 1955. The three volumes in The Adventure Girls were published in 1936, but never continued; although both series were sold in 1937, Beverly Gray ended up at Grosset & Dunlap, which could continue the series, while The Adventure Girls went to Saalfield Publishing, which only reprinted existing titles.

Outside of her writing career, Blank worked as a typist and secretary for the Keystone Pipeline Company before quitting in 1946 to focus on her family and writing. She died of cancer in 1965, at the age of 50.

== Background ==
=== Early life and education ===
Clarissa Mabel Blank was born on August 5, 1915, in Allentown, Pennsylvania, to Bessie and Edgar H. Blank. Her father worked as a loom fixer at a local silk mill, and later at a clothing plant in the Germantown section of Philadelphia. (Note: Three consecutive U.S. census reports—for 1920, 1930, and 1940—listed his occupation as a knitter.)

Blank attended Herbst Elementary School in Allentown until she was about ten. Her family then moved to the Olney section of Philadelphia. Though her parents had completed only nine years of schooling, Blank graduated from Olney High School with honors during the mid-winter commencement in February 1933, and published the first four books in her Beverly Gray series by age 18. She then attended Peirce School of Business Administration (now Peirce College) in Philadelphia.

=== After high school ===
Blank worked as a typist in Philadelphia for the Keystone Pipeline Company, a subsidiary of the Atlantic Refining Company. In 1940, she became a secretary there, and, still living with her parents, earned about $1,500 a year (equivalent to $34,500 in 2025). She joined the American Women's Voluntary Services during World War II, where she drove U.S. Army officers when they came to town. Blank left Keystone in 1946 to focus on raising her sons and to write.

== Author ==
Blank published 30 novels: the 26-volume Beverly Gray series from 1934 to 1955, the 3-volume The Adventure Girls series in 1936, and the adult novel Lover Come Back in 1940. In addition, at least two manuscripts went unpublished. In December 1941, Blank sent an unsolicited manuscript, Linda Ross at Hamilton, to Grosset & Dunlap. Her editor there rejected it four months later, writing that "there seems to be a strong prejudice against starting a new mystery series with a school background". Blank also wrote a novel to follow Beverly Gray's Surprise—the last in the series. This work was never printed, as the series was cancelled in 1955. In addition, a fourth Adventure Girls book—The Adventure Girls on Vacation—was advertised at the end of the third and never published, although it is unclear if Blank began work on it.

In addition to her novels, Blank may have authored magazine stories. According to the Allentown Morning Call, writing in 1934, Blank "recently sold a manuscript to a leading magazine". The article is quoted in Blank's entry in Something About the Author, which describes Blank as a "Contributor to magazines."

=== Beverly Gray ===
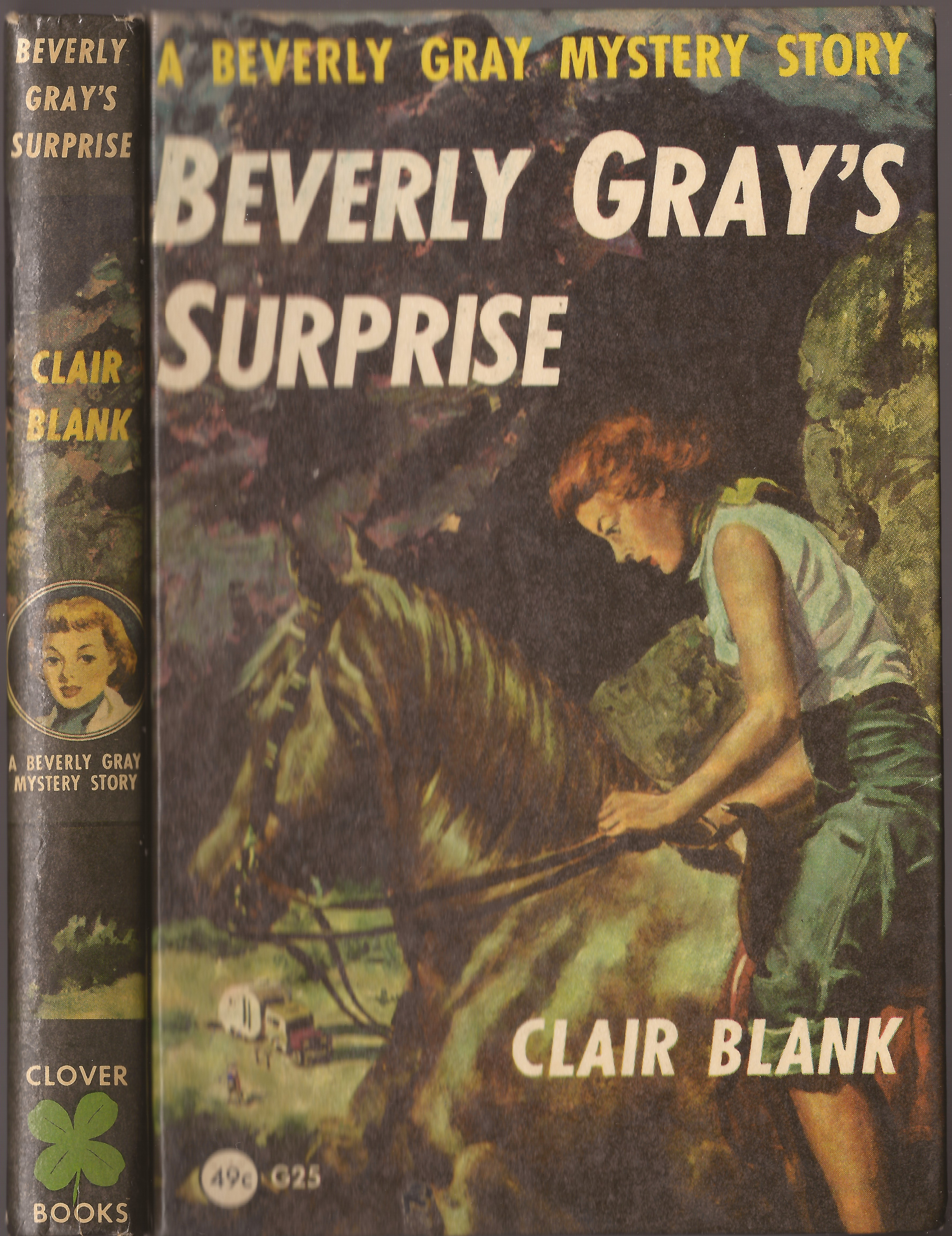
Beverly Gray's Surprise, the final volume in the series

Blank began writing the Beverly Gray books while in high school; by late 1933 she had sent a manuscript of the first volume to the publisher A. L. Burt, and by the following March she had completed the first four volumes. These were released as a "breeder set" around May. (Note: Breeder sets were a common tactic when issuing new series books, including with the Stratemeyer Syndicate: The first three or so would be published simultaneously in order to gauge reaction and build audience. Depending on the results, the series would (or would not) be continued.) Several local newspapers published profiles on Blank at the time, calling her "A story-writer at 19 with a record of never having had a manuscript rejected".

Blank wrote two additional Beverly Gray books in 1935, a seventh volume in 1936, and an eighth in 1937, receiving a flat fee of $175 for each of the eight (equivalent to $4,200 in 2025). In 1937, A. L. Burt was sold to Blue Ribbon Books; at the time, the Beverly Gray series was the best-selling girls' series sold by A. L. Burt. Although Blue Ribbon continued issuing the eight extant novels, the sale resulted in a nearly year-long period in which it was unclear if the series would be continued. Eventually, the series was sold in 1938 to the publisher Grosset & Dunlap. It published Beverly Gray on a Treasure Hunt that year. Blank also began earning royalties for the first time: two cents per book and later three (two cents in 1938 being equivalent to $0.5 in 2025), in addition to $200 per manuscript (equivalent to $4,600 in 2025).

In taking over the series, Grosset & Dunlap dropped the original sixth novel—Beverly Gray at the World's Fair, set at the Century of Progress in Chicago from 1933 to 1934—due to fears that it would date the series. It therefore renumbered the seventh and eighth books to make them the sixth and seventh, and published Beverly Gray on a Treasure Hunt as the eighth. Blank continued publishing one Beverly Gray book a year until Grosset & Dunlap cancelled the series in 1955. The later books in the series were thereafter republished by Clover Books, a reprint line acquired by Grosset & Dunlap in 1954, for some years.

#	Title	Copyright
1	Beverly Gray, Freshman	1934
2	Beverly Gray, Sophomore	1934
3	Beverly Gray, Junior	1934
4	Beverly Gray, Senior	1934
5	Beverly Gray's Career	1935
(6)*	Beverly Gray at the World's Fair	1935
6/7	Beverly Gray on a World Cruise	1936
7/8	Beverly Gray in the Orient	1937
8	Beverly Gray on a Treasure Hunt	1938
9	Beverly Gray's Return	1939
10	Beverly Gray, Reporter	1940
11	Beverly Gray's Romance	1941
12	Beverly Gray's Quest	1942
13	Beverly Gray's Problem	1943
14	Beverly Gray's Adventure	1944
15	Beverly Gray's Challenge	1945
16	Beverly Gray's Journey	1946
17	Beverly Gray's Assignment	1947
18	Beverly Gray's Mystery	1948
19	Beverly Gray's Vacation	1949
20	Beverly Gray's Fortune	1950
21	Beverly Gray's Secret	1951
22	Beverly Gray's Island Mystery	1952
23	Beverly Gray's Discovery	1953
24	Beverly Gray's Scoop	1954
25	Beverly Gray's Surprise	1955

*This title was dropped from the series in 1938.

=== The Adventure Girls ===
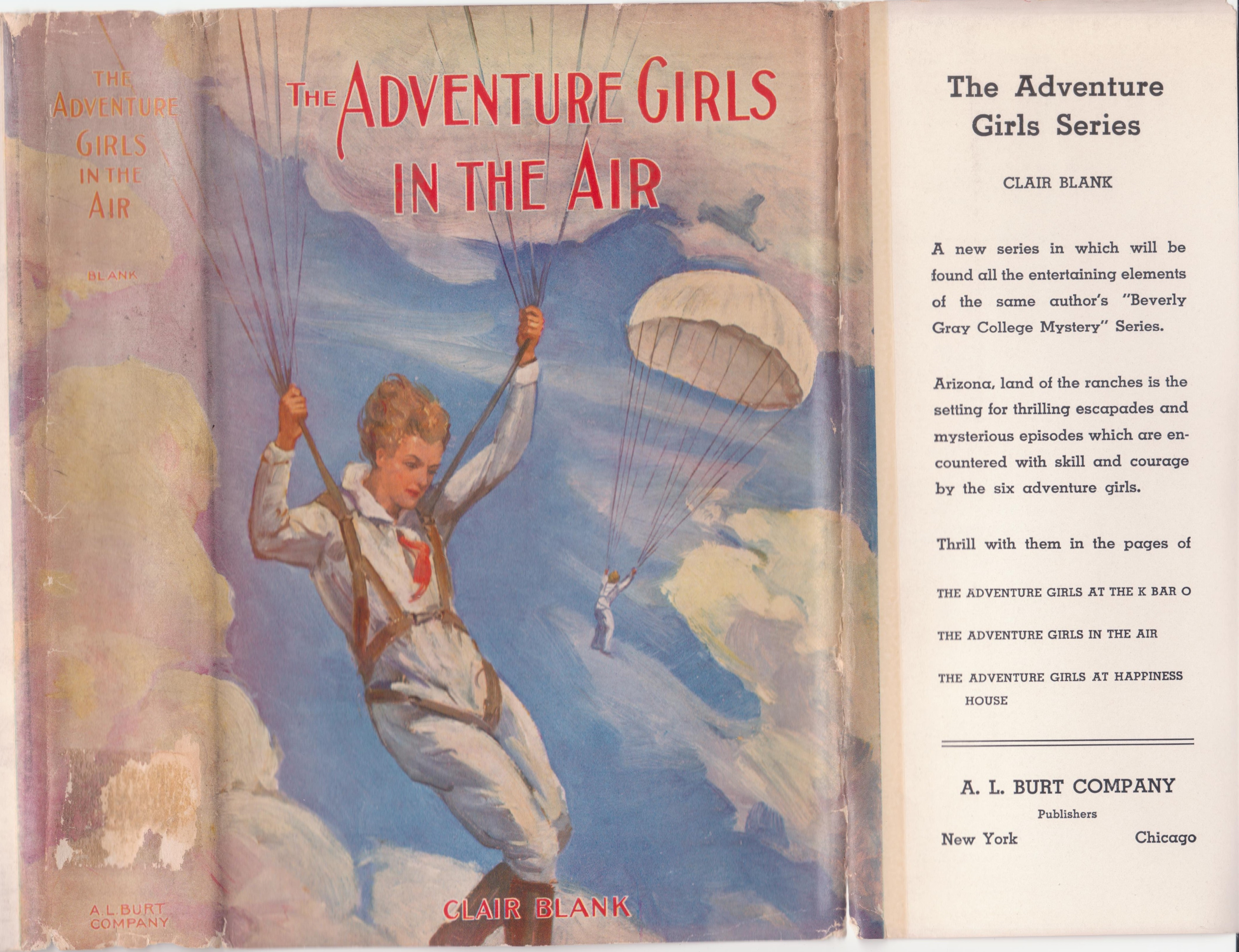
Dust jacket to The Adventure Girls in the Air

A trilogy by default, The Adventure Girls series was published as a breeder set by A. L. Burt in 1936 and never continued. All works were copyrighted on April 27, 1936, the same day as Beverly Gray on a World Cruise. Although a fourth work was advertised at the end of the third, it was never published. Unlike the Beverly Gray series, which was purchased by a publisher able to issue new titles, in 1937 The Adventure Girls series was purchased by Saalfield Publishing, which simply reprinted the titles in its catalog. Even then, new printings were not issued until the fall of 1942. None of the books had their copyright renewed.

#	Title	Copyright
1*	The Adventure Girls at K Bar O	1936
2	The Adventure Girls in the Air	1936
3	The Adventure Girls at Happiness House	1936
4^{†}	The Adventure Girls on Vacation	N/A

* Errantly referred to as "K-Bar-O" on the dust jacket

^{†} Advertised by name at the end of the third book but never published.

=== Lover Come Back ===
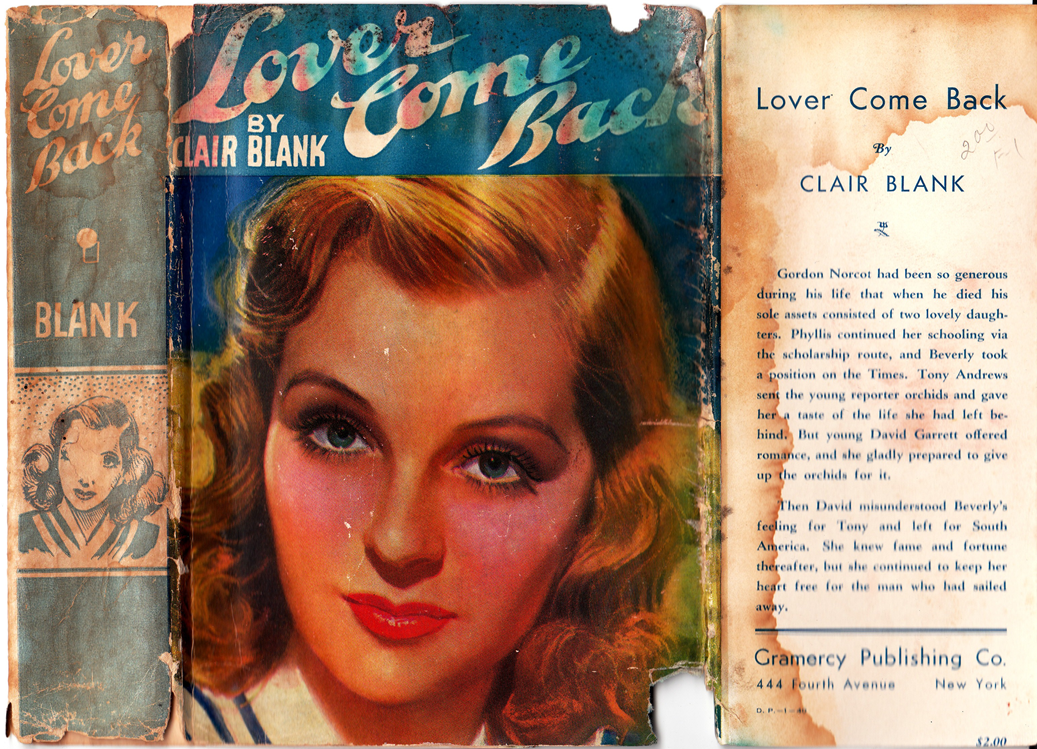
Dust jacket to Lover Come Back

Blank's only adult novel, Lover Come Back, was published in 1940 by Gramercy, now a division of Random House. Notices in The Pittsburgh Press state that it was printed in the paper's complete novel section on April 13, 1941. As a result of this limited print run, Lover Come Back remains particularly scarce.

Lover Come Back echoes the Beverly Gray series in both plot and writing style. Just as Beverly Gray is a successful screenwriter, playwright, novelist, and reporter for the Herald Tribune, Beverly Norcot shares the same vocations and success, and reports for The Times, presumably The New York Times. Just as Beverly Gray leads "such a life of adventure as would tax the resources of any soap opera heroine", in the words of one reviewer, Lover Come Back, in the words of another, "is a soap opera" with a "series of mini-climaxes strung together". The book's "major ingredients" consist of:

"3 auto accidents (2 human, 1 canine)
2 shootings
1 emergency appendectomy
3 witnessing by jealous suitor of girlfriend embracing another man
3 reversals of fortune (1 downward, 2 upward)
2 sudden disappearances of boyfriends out of the country
4 unexpected reunions of same with girls
numerous reversals of feeling between lovers
frequent dashing around by characters in cars, ships, and a plane
multiple rendezvous at society parties [and] swanky nightclubs"

== Personal life ==
Blank was a member of the Order of the Eastern Star, and taught Sunday school for many years. Similar to the group of friends in the Beverly Gray books, Blank's group consisted of four longtime friends with whom she met regularly. She took weekend trips with her friends to New York, and later spent summers with family in Wildwood, New Jersey. Though Blank did not cover the globe like Beverly Gray, she enjoyed travel, including several trips to California: one for the Golden Gate International Exposition in 1939, and one in 1960 with her family.

In 1941, George Elmer Moyer, whom Clair knew while growing up in Allentown, moved to Philadelphia; the two married two years later, on April 10, 1943. Moyer attained the rank of sergeant while serving in the U.S. Army for two years, from February 1944 to February 1946, at the end of World War II. A skilled welder, he was employed at the Budd Company after his military service, working on automobiles, tank construction, Chevrolet fenders, and plastics until his retirement. He also took night classes in mechanical engineering at Drexel University in Philadelphia. The couple had two sons, Robert G. and John C. Moyer, who were born in 1947 and 1953, respectively.

Blank had surgery for cancer around 1960. It eventually returned, and she died on August 15, 1965, in Philadelphia. Her husband died on February 27, 1998; obituaries were published in the Courier-Post, the Allentown Morning Call, the Philadelphia Daily News, and The Philadelphia Inquirer.

== Bibliography ==
- Abreu, John E. (May–June 1984). "Beverly Gray: Junior Soap, A Golden Anniversary Retrospective". Yellowback Library (21): 3–8. OCLC 8523968.
- Commire, Anne, ed. (1990). "Clair Blank". Something About the Author: Facts and Pictures About Authors and Illustrators of Books for Young People. Vol. 62. Detroit: Gale Research Inc. pp. 4–5. ISBN 0-8103-2272-2. ISSN 0276-816X. LCCN 72-27107.
- Gowen, William (January–February 2009). "Worthy challenger to the Stratemeyer Syndicate: A.L. Burt's inexpensive series books, 1905–37" (PDF). Newsboy. XLVII (1): 8–12.
- Grossman, Anita Susan (January 1989a). "The Mystery of Clair Blank". Yellowback Library (55): 5–14. OCLC 8523968.
- Grossman, Anita Susan (January 1989b). "Clair Blank and Her Publishers: A Look at the Written Record". Yellowback Library (66): 5–15. OCLC 8523968.
- Grossman, Anita Susan (April 1994). "A Note on McLoughlin Brothers and Clover Books". Yellowback Library (118): 12. OCLC 8523968.
- Grossman, Anita Susan (October 1998). "Lover Come Back: A Synopsis of Clair Blank's Forgotten Novel". The Whispered Watchword (98–10): 20–27. OCLC 1114933237.
- Keeline, James D. (October 12, 2022). "A". The Series Book Encyclopedia: A Bio-Bibliographical Dictionary of Twentieth Century Series Fiction for Boys and Girls with special emphasis on Stratemeyer Syndicate series and those most collected today (PDF). Pre-publication draft. pp. 1–46. Archived (PDF) from the original on November 6, 2026.
- Lange, Brenda (2004). Edward Stratemeyer: Creator of the Hardy boys and Nancy Drew. Who Wrote That?. Philadelphia: Chelsea House Publishers. ISBN 0-7910-7621-0.
- United States Copyright Office (1937). Catalogue of Copyright Entries: Part 1, Books, Group 1. New Series. Vol. 33. Washington, D.C.: United States Government Printing Office.
