= Ottewell =

Ottewell may refer to:

- Ottewell, Edmonton, a neighbourhood of Edmonton, Alberta, Canada
- Ben Ottewell (born 1976), British musician
- Sid Ottewell (1919–2012), British footballer

== See also ==
- Ottewill
- Otwell (disambiguation)
