= Ottewill =

Ottewill is an English surname. Notable people with the surname include:

- Brandon Ormonde-Ottewill (born 1995), English footballer
- Peter Ottewill (1915–2003), English Air Force officer

== See also ==
- Ottewell (disambiguation)
