= Ottwell Binns =

British novelist and minister

- Born: 11 February 1872; Rochdale, Lancashire, U.K.
- Died: 27 November 1935 (aged 63); Penzance, Cornwall, U.K.
- Other names: Ben Bolt, Benjamin Bolt
- Occupation(s): Writer, minister
- Children: 4, including Bernard Ottwell Binns

Ottwell Binns (11 February 1872 – 27 November 1935) was a British novelist and Unitarian minister. He wrote mostly genre fiction, adventures, mysteries, and at least one science fiction novel, Dan Yeo; Or, The Island of the Lost (1929).

== Early life ==
Binns was born in Rochdale, Lancashire, the son of Thomas Binns. He trained for the ministry at Western College, in Plymouth. He was a Congregational minister in Portland, then a Unitarian minister in Scarborough, Ainsworth, Mansfield, and Torquay. He was a Freemason and served on the library committee in Mansfield.

== Career ==
Binns was a prolific author, publishing many novels of adventure and mystery, from 1917 to 1939. His publisher in Britain was Ward Lock. Binns also published novels with Ward Lock under the pseudonym of Ben Bolt; these were similar in subject matter and treatment to the novels published under his own name. His stories were set in many locations, including Britain and the European continent, Africa, Asia, the South Pacific, the Caribbean and Canada, particularly the Yukon. His novels always feature a courageous, resourceful hero and a love interest, and there is an emphasis on action and narrow escapes from danger. His novel A Mating in the Wild was published in the U.S. in 1920 by Alfred A. Knopf and the A. L. Burt Company.

== Personal life and legacy ==
Binns married and was the father of three sons and a daughter. He died in 1935, at the age of 63, in a Penzance hospital. Ward Lock continued to publish novels under his name until 1939. His son Max Dalman Binns was also a mystery writer, under the name Max Dalman. Another son, Bernard Ottwell Binns, was Commission of Settlements and Land Records in Burma, and received the OBE in 1941.

== Work ==
A partial list of his published books includes:

- 1917 The Man from Maloba
- 1918 A Sin of Silence
- 1919 The Lady of the Miniature
- 1920 The Mystery of the Heart
- 1920 A Mating in the Wilds
- 1922 The Treasure of Christophe
- 1922 The Lady of North Star
- 1923 The Lifting of the Shadow
- 1924 Clancy of the Mounted Police
- 1925 The Trail of Adventure
- 1925 Java Jack
- 1926 A Gipsy of the North
- 1926 Flotsam of the Line
- 1928 Behind the Ranges
- 1930 Dan Yeo
- 1930 The Vanished Guest
- 1930 The White Hands of Justice
- 1931 The Secret Pearls
- 1931 The Grey Rat
- 1931 The Flaming Crescent
- 1932 Trader Random
- 1933 Secret Adventure
- 1934 Gold is King
- 1934 The Red Token
- 1935 The Last Door
- 1936 The Far Pursuit
- 1936 Weeds of Hate
- 1937 A Soldier of the Legion
- 1937 The Poisoned Pen
- 1938 By Papuan Waters
- 1938 A Shot in the Woods

A partial list of novels written as Ben Bolt:

- 1921 Diana of the Islands
- 1921 The Diamond Buckled Shoe
- 1928 The Jewels of Sin
- 1930 The Badge
- 1930 The Other Three
- 1930 The Coil of Mystery
- 1931 The Forest Ranger
- 1931 The Sealed Envelope
- 1932 The Subway Mystery
- 1933 The Green Arrow
- 1935 The Crooked Sign
- 1936 The Five Red Stars
- 1936 The Empty House Mystery
- 1937 By Breathless Ways
- 1939 The Girl in the Train
