= Beverly Gray =

Series of children's novels by Clair Blank

The cover illustration of Beverly Gray

Beverly Gray is a series of mystery stories comprising 26 novels, and published between 1934 and 1955, by Clair Blank. The novels began as a series of school stories, following the progress of Beverly, its main character, through college, various romances, and a career as a reporter, before evolving strictly into a mystery series.

Beverly is portrayed as an extraordinarily determined individual, with "a driving ambition in her heart that would not let her idle her life away". Across 26 books, she leads "such a life of adventure as would tax the resources of any soap opera heroine".

== Books ==
#	Title	Copyright
1	Beverly Gray, Freshman	1934
2	Beverly Gray, Sophomore	1934
3	Beverly Gray, Junior	1934
4	Beverly Gray, Senior	1934
5	Beverly Gray's Career	1935
(6)*	Beverly Gray at the World's Fair	1935
6/7	Beverly Gray on a World Cruise	1936
7/8	Beverly Gray in the Orient	1937
8	Beverly Gray on a Treasure Hunt	1938
9	Beverly Gray's Return	1939
10	Beverly Gray, Reporter	1940
11	Beverly Gray's Romance	1941
12	Beverly Gray's Quest	1942
13	Beverly Gray's Problem	1943
14	Beverly Gray's Adventure	1944
15	Beverly Gray's Challenge	1945
16	Beverly Gray's Journey	1946
17	Beverly Gray's Assignment	1947
18	Beverly Gray's Mystery	1948
19	Beverly Gray's Vacation	1949
20	Beverly Gray's Fortune	1950
21	Beverly Gray's Secret	1951
22	Beverly Gray's Island Mystery	1952
23	Beverly Gray's Discovery	1953
24	Beverly Gray's Scoop	1954
25	Beverly Gray's Surprise	1955

*This title was dropped from the series in 1938.

=== Beverly Gray, Freshman ===
"With a last desperate effort, Beverly stumbled out into the night".

Beverly Gray, Freshman is the first book in the Beverly Gray series. Published concurrently in 1934 with Sophomore, Junior, and Senior, it introduces Beverly as a freshman at Vernon College.

Beverly makes her first appearance as she steps off the train carrying her to Vernon College. She is accompanied by her childhood friend, Anne White. They attend Vernon to follow in their mothers' footsteps. Beverly's mother is described as "the patron saint of Vernon College".

The two girls settle into life at Vernon College, where Beverly's paternal surname affords her anonymity as she attempts to succeed "on her own merits, not under another's colors". Three of the other four freshmen in her dormitory, Lenora Whitehill, Rosalie Arnold, and Lois Mason, prove friendly, while Beverly's roommate Shirley Parker is "aloof" and "patronizing". These girls variously join Beverly in the seven chapters preceding winter break, where they break curfew to view a movie (chapter 2); are caught (chapter 3); are hazed by the sophomores and juniors (chapter 4); gain revenge by crashing the junior and sophomore masquerade dance (chapter 5); scrape through a geometry examination (chapter 6); and beat the juniors in a basketball game (chapter 7).

Winter break sees Beverly and Anne reunite the "Lucky Circle", a collection of eight childhood friends, and together they go camping. As the group returns home, they become lost in a blizzard. The boys in the group try to find their way back, with Beverly leading them. She sprains her ankle, falls down a hill, and awakes to the sight of a tall and disheveled-looking woman. The "hermit woman of Dunnsville", or "Big Bertha", as she calls herself, is a homicidal escapee from a sanitarium. Bertha believes Beverly to be the daughter for whose death she was responsible and starts treating her ankle. During Beverly's second night of captivity, she sneaks away while Bertha sleeps, but she falls into a pit trap and climbs out to find herself face to face with a bear. Bertha arrives and fights the animal. They return to the cabin, where Beverly's father shows up to rescue her, and Bertha escapes.

During the spring term, Beverly discovers that Shirley is sneaking out at night to meet a man, Tom. He exhorts her to run away with him, and Shirley agrees to go the next night. Beverly, Anne, Lenora, Lois, and Rosalie confront her to no avail. Shirley leaves but returns shortly thereafter.

Shirley is a new woman upon her return and is no longer unfriendly, losing her aloofness toward Beverly when the latter saves her from a fire. Beverly ends up in the college infirmary with her mother watching over her, and Shirley visits to offer her friendship.

The remainder of Beverly's first year passes quickly. Shirley performs in a play and is asked to join a theater company over the summer. Tom, who witnesses her performance, is rebuffed again when he attempts to woo her. He returns as Beverly and Shirley walk back to their dormitory, confronting them with a revolver and demanding ten thousand dollars from Shirley's rich father, threatening to sell the "story of the rich Shirley Parker who was going to run away with a thief" to the newspapers. Shirley calls his bluff, and Beverly whacks his wrist with a stick causing him to drop the gun. Tom leaves, and Shirley keeps his revolver as a memento. The book ends with a going-away party at the students' favorite ice cream parlor, where Beverly's friends gather for a celebration in her honor. The college dean gives a toast, and Beverly is given an engraved watch.

=== Beverly Gray, Sophomore ===
"The two girls ran all the way from Chadwick Hall".

Beverly Gray, Sophomore explores the mystery that the series would become known for. Beverly spends most of her year investigating a seemingly haunted mansion used by drug smugglers. She also manages to foil a jewel theft over winter break, survive a plane crash, and solve the theft of a set of history examination questions.

Now in their second year at Vernon College, the six main girls reunite in Beverly's room and form a sorority, the "Alpha Delta Sorority". Beverly joins the Comet, the college paper, as an entry into a literary career. The Comet's editor, Alison Cox, assigns Beverly to investigate the strange happenings in the abandoned Horler Mansion, a decaying structure whose last owner was reportedly murdered.

In her first trip to the house, Beverly encounters an unkempt man with a "long, evil-looking scar". The man warns Beverly of "ghosts", introduces himself as "the head ghost", and escorts her "roughly" to the door. Beverly gains reentry through a back window and discovers "pink packets filled with a finely ground powder" in the mansion's attic. Beverly leaves without taking a sample, and when she returns three days later "all the boxes [are] gone". The mystery deepens when various Alpha Delta girls observe "a skeleton dance" on successive nights, where ten skeletons move in "queer jerky steps" in the mansion while "making chill-provoking groans and murmurs".

Beverly's next trip inside the house finds her face to face with a handsome young man named Larry. He remains mysterious to Beverly, who can't figure out whether he is one of the "ghosts" or not. Nevertheless, she is attracted to him. On Halloween, dressed in a Robin Hood costome, Larry crashes the sophomore dance, the same one that Beverly herself crashed the year before. He claims to be there to "ask questions about the Horler Mansion", and he shares two dances with Beverly.

On Beverly's third visit to the Horler Mansion, she encounters another sinister character. Through the window, she sees the grotesque face of a "Chinaman". Beverly continues exploring when the man does not reappear, but upon making her way back to the attic, she is locked in by "the head ghost". Larry arrives to pull her out through the skylight, and they escape together. Two days later, Beverly's friend Lenora vanishes inside the mansion, and Beverly and Shirley go after her. In the scene depicted on the book's dust jacket, they run from their dormitory to the mansion, where they find Lenora unconscious in the cellar. They determine that she tripped on a broken step and fell, while Larry arrives to aid the girls as they take Lenora back to campus.

On Thanksgiving, Yale plays Jackson College. Beverly and Anne are at the Yale Bowl to witness Jim Stanton, a childhood friend who has a crush on Beverly, score a touchdown. Yale wins, and at that night's celebratory dance Jim suddenly kisses Beverly. The chapter concludes, and Jim is not mentioned again in Sophomore. The girls return to Vernon College to hear that an unidentified man was shot near the Horler Mansion while they were away.

Before the mysteries surrounding Horler Mansion can be investigated any further, the six Alpha Delpha girls travel to Shirley's residence in New York City for the Christmas holidays. Shirley's parents prove too distracted with their own lives to pay attention to their daughter and her friends. The girls pass the time by attending a number of upscale parties. At one of these events, Beverly is approached by Charlie Blaine, a reporter for the Herald Tribune. They find they have much in common, including both being reporters. The following afternoon, he takes the girls sightseeing around the best and worst parts of the city.

Two days after their tour of Manhattan, Charlie Blaine invites Beverly to help him cover a ball in honor of the "Duke of Abernethy". Beverly dances with the "Comte de Bourgeine", who seems particularly "fond of jewels". Soon after, one of the attendees reports her bracelet has been stolen. Beverly sees the count slip away, and overhears him on the telephone, declaring that "I've got it". While Charlie leaves to get the police, Beverly confronts the thief, scuffling with him long enough for two officers to arrive and arrest him. In the morning, the Herald Tribune prints the story of her efforts. With their holiday adventures at an end, the girls take the train back to Vernon.

On Beverly's next trip to the Horler Mansion, she again encounters "that evil-looking Chinaman", who warns her away in broken English. She then contacts Inspector Dugan of the Vernon police, who suggests that "the most logical explanation" is that the men are "smuggling drugs into this country" from "the Orient". The inspector leaves to unsuccessfully search for the men in the mansion. Beverly follows later and conveniently sees the "Chinaman" using a secret passage hidden behind the front room's fireplace. She enters it and discovers an opium den, but the secret door closes, trapping her inside. Unable to escape, she decides to wait for the man to return. In the resulting confrontation, the "Chinaman" is introduced as "Wah Fang", and Pete (the "head ghost") threatens to put Beverly "on a boat bound for China". Larry and Inspector Dugan arrive to break down the dividing wall, but not before Wah Fang chokes Beverly unconscious. He then attacks Larry, but is shot by the inspector before inflicting any harm. The next day, Beverly and Larry arrive at the inspector's office and the final details of the mystery are explained. Larry is employed by the Secret Service and has been chasing the gang of smugglers from the beginning. His partner is revealed to have been the unknown man who was shot, a crime to which Pete confesses. Other smugglers were also involved, and the "skeleton dance" is explained by the men donning "black suits" with "bones in phosphorescent paint" in order scare people away.

The mysterious goings on at the Horler Mansion may be over, but the same cannot be said for Sophomore. Beverly's adventures continue in a plane crash with Larry, who has promised to take her flying in his monoplane. Their plane is caught in a storm and its engine fails. Beverly and Larry are "thrown clear" of the wreckage, sustaining "a broken rib" and "a broken arm" respectively. A hike through the surrounding woods takes them to the house of poor farmers, who call for a doctor. The doctor alerts Beverly's friends, who arrive with Inspector Dugan in the inspector's car. Beverly and Larry soon recover from their injuries.

The final excitement in Beverly Gray, Sophomore comes when a history examination is stolen from the office of Professor Leonard. Beverly and Shirley happen to be looking out their window at the right time to see the movements of the thief, a girl "gliding silently and mysteriously from dark shadow to shadow across the campus". That evening, Shirley is accused of stealing the test, and it is revealed that her "silver bracelet, with her name engraved on it, was found just inside the window". Professor Leonard is especially suspicious of Shirley, because of her low history grades. Shirley resigns herself to being expelled, while the other Alpha Delta girls attempt to catch the real culprit. Their suspicions center on "snobbish May Norris", the professor's assistant and "teacher's pet". Beverly's suspicions are confirmed when Alison Cox, who lives in May's dormitory, tells her that she saw May prowling about on the night of the theft. Beverly confronts May, who confesses to the crime. Shirley, despite her close brush with expulsion, forgives May, appearing "before the faculty and ask[ing] for leniency". Adventure and mystery finally over, the girls depart for their summer break.

=== Beverly Gray, Junior ===
"Anselo stopped close to the window and continued his playing".

Opening on the first day of term, Beverly Gray, Junior is the story of Beverly's third year at Vernon College, which includes her kidnapping by a group of gypsies. Her rescue does come in time, however, for a few parting adventures: Winter break sees Beverly and Shirley suffer skiing and ice skating injuries, while the attempts by May Norris to sabotage Shirley's role as Hamlet in the school play ultimately effect her redemption.

A band of gypsies has set up camp on the outskirts of Vernon. The six Alpha Delta girls visit them to have their fortunes told. They are met at the camp by Orlenda, and Beverly is warned of impending danger. Returning to Vernon College, the girls notice a "dark and swarthy" man, whom they immediately assume is a thief. He denies the accusation but then flees, dropping stolen money and jewelry as he does.

That night, after leaving to mail letters from town, Beverly fails to return. Her disappearance is met with alarm, and both her parents and Inspector Dugan are notified. Because of her father's political importance, Beverly's picture is "put in every newspaper in the country". The first purported news is that a "girl matching Beverly's description" was in a Vernon art shop the night of her disappearance, when it was robbed by a man "believed to be a gypsy". He had stolen the girl's wristwatch, and she had given chase. Although the shop owner offers conflicting descriptions, the Alpha Delta girls know Beverly is attached to her watch, which was presented to her at the end of her first year "for extraordinary heroism". Inspector Dugan is "positive" that Beverly has been kidnapped, since "there have been so many kidnappings in the country", and he holds the gypsies responsible. Meanwhile, Jim Stanton and Larry Owens (who were introduced in Sophomore) arrive to aid in the search. Two days later, the boys depart in Larry's monoplane to search the gypsy camp. They land on a nearby road and quickly earn an invitation to the camp, where they observe a sealed wagon protected by two men. Soon after this, Inspector Dugan and his men arrive. Armed with a warrant, they search every wagon, including the sealed one. The gypsies protest that the wagon contains a "sick grandmother" who must not be disturbed. The Inspector agrees to let two gypsies enter first and "prepare the old woman" before he investigates. His search is fruitless, and he returns to Vernon with Larry and Jim. Three days later, Gerry Foster (a friend from Freshman) writes to tell Shirley she has seen Beverly at the County Fair in the company of a strange man.

As Larry and Jim fly to the fair, the narration turns back nine days to tell Beverly's side of the story. On her way to mail letters, she stops in the art shop. Suddenly, the "dark and swarthy" man enters, intending to rob the store. He takes the money from the register and steals Beverly's watch as a bonus. She pursues him, but upon catching up, she finds the tables turned. The man pins "her arms to her sides" and throws her into a "gypsy wagon". There she is met by Orlenda, the woman who had warned Beverly earlier about impending danger. Orlenda suggests to Dimiti, Beverly's kidnapper, that they might be able to ransom the girl. They depart with Beverly a hostage in their wagon, and in the morning they attempt to dye her skin with a "mysterious brown substance". As Dimiti explains it, the "liquid is to make your skin darker so, if anyone should see you, you could pass for one of us". Beverly attempts to escape but is quickly subdued. The pair daub her skin with the liquid until it becomes "as dark as any of the gypsies'".

Although the gypsies are almost universally described as unpleasant, unkempt and ruthless, there is one that does not fit the mold. Anselo is a "refined" gypsy who carries "the bearing of a gentleman", and "a touch of Old World gallantry". He is also an extraordinary violinist, serenading Beverly from outside the wagon where she is held prisoner. He also reunites Beverly with her wristwatch, which he has somehow obtained from Dimiti. The next day, Anselo takes Beverly for a walk in the woods, during which he suggests she has "the gypsy heart". Beverly admits that the roving life fascinates her. She nevertheless complains that "Gypsies don't like to work. . . . That is why they are so restless. They roam about, living on what the earth produces". The conversation ends when the pair see Larry's airplane overhead, which Beverly recognizes. Anselo refuses to return to camp, admitting that Dimiti had anticipated a police investigation and ordered him to take Beverly away for a while. Beverly realizes that Anselo's loyalty still lies with the gypsies and not with her.

The gypsies migrate to a new camp, and Anselo proposes to take Beverly to the County Fair if she promises not to run away. The other gypsies are unaware of his plan, and they continue their usual pattern of cheating and stealing. At the fair, Beverly is spotted simultaneously by Gerry and Dimiti, who is there trading horses. Anselo takes Beverly back to her wagon, where she is joined that afternoon by an irate Dimiti. He claims to have "slashed" Anselo with a knife, and he attempts to seduce Beverly. In the ensuing struggle, Beverly thrusts Dimiti's knife "deep into the flesh of his upper arm", and he responds by knocking her unconscious.

By the next night, the gypsies have moved once again, this time to "a regular camping place in the hills". Beverly, Anselo and Dimiti have all recovered, the latter two with bandaged wounds. Larry and Jim, meanwhile, arrive at the county fair and are directed to the camping grounds. They wait until night to investigate but are caught by the gypsies. Larry and Jim are bound and thrown in "a cave on the hillside". Watching from her wagon, Beverly implores Anselo to help them escape, and he agrees. Anselo enters the cave under cover of darkness and frees the boys. He then reveals where Beverly is being held and asks that they tell her "Anselo wishes her happiness always". Jim and Larry rescue Beverly (who throws herself at Jim), and together they return to Larry's plane. Beverly sprains her ankle in the process, and the boys carry her the rest of the way.

Having failed in their kidnapping efforts, the gypsies quickly disappear. The story moves on to winter break, where Larry proposes to Beverly, who declines. Jim leaves to take an engineering job in Wyoming, and Shirley is invited to Renville. Assuring Beverly that (despite being from New York) she will not find Renville dull, Shirley hints at the premise for The Adventure Girls at K Bar O when she declares that she spent one summer on a ranch in Arizona. Beverly, Shirley and Anne leave shortly before Christmas for home, where the Lucky Circle (sans Jim) is reunited. The usual celebrations and gaiety intersperse themselves among several close calls. Shirley and Beverly barely avoid crashing into Anne and Joan's "wrecked sled". Shirley learns to ski, only to be knocked unconscious at the bottom of a hill. She is "fit as a fiddle" the next day, and accompanies the Lucky Circle ice skating on "the lake front". When Bucky Harris, "a chubby little fellow" who "lives across the street from" Beverly, falls through thin ice, Shirley inches towards him and also falls in. She pushes Bucky back on the ice before losing consciousness again. Beverly ties a rope to herself and jumps in after Shirley while the Lucky Circle pulls them to safety. Despite their adventure, the girls prove none the worse for wear, and the next afternoon their friends come by to anoint Shirley "an honorary member of the Lucky Circle". Beverly and company return to school in high spirits.

The Christmas holidays are "weeks past", when they are next heard from. The six Alpha Delta girls are planning the junior production of Hamlet. Lenora is the director, Lois is cast as Ophelia, Beverly is "in charge of the scenery" with Anne as her assistant, and Rosalie has "charge of the costumes". Shirley is to play the leading role, fulfilling a pledge made in Sophomore to pursue an acting career. This assignment comes at the expense of May Norris, who is "no friend of any of the Alphas" after Shirley was wrongfully accused of stealing examination questions in the previous year. May has "her heart set on playing the lead" but must settle for understudy. When Josephine Carter breaks her arm falling down a flight of stairs to the storeroom, claiming afterwards that "[s]omebody pushed me", Lenora suspects May. Beverly is tapped to replace Josephine as Hamlet's mother, and "nothing ever [comes] to light about the 'accident'". In the following weeks, May feigns friendliness towards Shirley, a shift from her previous "violent dislike" of "all the Alpha girls". Her true nature is revealed on the day of the play, when she convinces Shirley to investigate "[m]ysterious lights and figures that have been seen in the old Horler Mansion again". Shirley relents when May accuses her of being "afraid of the ghosts" and May promptly locks her in the attic where Beverly had been imprisoned the previous year. Luckily, Beverly is aware of May's plan, having intentionally eavesdropped on a conversation between May and her roommate. She hurries to the mansion and frees Shirley, who returns just in time to impress the audience with her performance. After the show, a movie producer stops by the dressing room to announce his intention of making "a motion picture [at Vernon College] next year". He suggests the girls audition for minor parts before departing.

As the girls leave the auditorium, they notice "[l]ittle wafts of smoke" coming from under May's dressing room door. The girls break down the door and extinguish the fire, discovering "a lighted cigarette in the ash tray". Knowing that May was the only one in the room who smokes, the girls confront her and threaten to inform the dean (smoking is strictly forbidden on campus). May promises to give up her habit and apologizes for her previous bad behavior. The girls offer May a chance to "reform", tell the dean of the fire without mentioning May's involvement, and head back to their dormitory to sleep.

By the concluding chapter is it June, "and time to part for the summer vacation". Beverly has been elected class president for the coming year: "She was so typically the American College Girl. Her warm-heartedness and sense of fair play and good sportsmanship had won for her an army of friends. It was no wonder, when everyone loved her, that she should have been chosen as their leader. It would have been more to wonder at if she didn't". Junior thus comes to an end, promising "new and exciting adventures" in Beverly Gray, Senior.

=== Beverly Gray, Senior ===
"The man they were chasing drove like a madman".

Beverly's last year at Vernon College forms the basis for Beverly Gray, Senior, the fourth and final work in Clair Blank's 1934 breeder set. Sports-related tribulations, commencement activities, and Shirley's fame-induced snobbishness form an undercurrent to the two main plot pieces: the arrival of a film company on campus, and Shirley's eventual kidnapping.

As promised in the previous term, Senior opens with the arrival of the Forsythe Film Company at Vernon College to shoot a "college picture", in return for which the school will receive money to build "a new indoor swimming pool for the students". "Directors, actors, [and] cameramen" all descend upon the town, alongside the star Marcia Lyman, a "dark beauty" and "dazzling figure" fresh from Hollywood. Oddly, the planned film does not have a screenplay, and rather than hire a professional, Mr. Forsythe decides to hold a script-writing contest among the students and film the winning submission. Each of the six Alpha Delta girls put pen to paper, but only Beverly and Lenora following through to completion. Beverly's screenplay, Stepping Stone, takes first place, while Lenora's A Senior's Dilemma, or They Shall Not Pass, "deserves honorable mention".

A snag hits Beverly's newfound fame the next day, when Marcia Lyman leaves "the movie company flat" to take "a new contract with a much higher salary" from Cordial Pictures Company. Mr. Forsythe quickly gives up and plans to return to home, but Lenora has a better idea. She suggests that aspiring actress Shirley take over Marcia's role. Forsythe agrees, and with the star and story set, film production begins.

The proceeding chapters reveal Shirley's success going to her head, and the remaining Alpha Delta girls butting heads with a group of six juniors: Connie Elwood, Kathleen Ryan, Ada Collins, Evelyn DeLong, Virginia Harris, and Phyllis Tanner. As president of the senior class, it falls on Beverly to govern the juniors. She finds herself repeatedly running afoul of their schemes, much to her frustration. Worse yet, her elected position comes with little power to punish the girls, or otherwise stop their antics. Between dealing with Shirley's ego, and the increasing trouble in their dormitory, Beverly is exhausted.

The middle section of Senior is defined by a series of episodic events. A détente emerges between the six seniors and the six juniors, with Connie promising to "do our part" to "keep things peaceful". Shirley, who has apparently supplanted Beverly as the "shining light on the basketball team", refuses to let the senior-junior game interfere with her filming and subsequently watches from the stands as the seniors lose by a single point. Connie and her friends show up uninvited at the seniors' Halloween "Fiction Dance", copying the Alphas' move from Freshman. Jim Stanton, who was last seen leaving for an engineering job in Wyoming, returns to Renville from a job well done only to have his Christmas Eve proposal declined by Beverly. A movie "camera [is] mysteriously smashed", and the Cordial Pictures Company is suspected of trying to stop Forsythe's production. Beverly and Lenora catch one "Mr. Smith" attempting to "climb in the window" of the Forsythe Film Company's railway coach, and the next day, they find the door "broken open" and "three rolls of film" missing. Having followed Mr. Smith to the Wildon Hotel the previous night, Beverly and Lenora go back and gain entrance to his room through the fire escape. There, they recover the stolen film and elude the hotel authorities. Forsythe is overjoyed and rewards Vernon College with $5,000 and the necessary funds to build a new swimming pool.

The "winter turn[s] to spring" and with it comes a new source of trouble: Shirley is kidnapped. While walking back to the college, she is captured by two men and swept away. That night, Beverly receives a ransom note demanding $10,000 from Shirley's parents, the Parkers. She informs Lenora, Rosalie, Miss Wilder, Mrs. Dennis and the Parkers. In two days time, Beverly and Lenora place the ransom money in "a hollow tree stump" near the old Horler Mansion. They then hide in the house, watching the stump from upstairs. The kidnappers arrive, and Beverly hides in the trunk of their car. She is taken to an "old house", "three stories" tall with shades "drawn tight to shut out prying eyes". Beverly waits for the men to enter, then follows through the back door. Inside, she overhears them gloating and planning to "deliver another note demanding twenty-five thousand". Climbing the stairs, she discovers Shirley in a locked room on the second floor. From there, they dash to the car, driving off and leaving the men "dancing like wild Indians".

Shirley's kidnappers do not waste much time dancing. Rather, they call the police in a neighboring "little suburban town", telling them to be on the lookout for a stolen car. Shirley and Beverly are soon pulled over and informed that their "father told us you took the car and were running away", and that the police "are to hold you until he gets here". At the police station, Shirley convinces the policemen to call her real father, but he is unable to arrive before the kidnappers appear, claiming to be friends of the girls. One man talks to the police chief while the other walks to the girls, "a revolver in his hand", and threatens them to back up the story. Beverly speaks the truth instead and narrowly avoids being shot. Shirley's father arrives unseen but is overpowered. Beverly, Shirley, Mr. Parker and the police chief are held at gunpoint, until Beverly edges around the men, takes a flashlight from her pocket, and thrusts "it against the back of the man before her with a stern command to put up his hands". Mr. Parker and the chief use this distraction to throw themselves upon the kidnappers: one is handcuffed, and the other bolts for the exit.

The ensuing car chase is shown on the dust jacket. The kidnapper jumps into his car while the girls, along with Mr. Parker, pile into the police chief's car. The chase ends when a truck sideswipes the kidnapper's car, flipping it over. The kidnapper is pulled out of the wreckage and arrested. Mr. Parker then drives the girls back to Vernon, where they regale their classmates with the story of their adventure.

Spring term continues, and Shirley gradually makes amends with the girls she had previously "snubbed" and "treated shamefully". Beverly "resign[s] from the tennis team", ostensibly because she does not have "the time to devote to practice". It is implied she is resigning to make Shirley feel better about quitting the basketball team earlier. This interpretation is believed by Shirley herself, and she entreats Beverly not to "make the mistake I made". Beverly changes her tune and her resignation is forgotten. With Beverly on the team, the "championship tennis match between Vernon College and Wayne Seminary" results in a Vernon victory. In the course of the match, Beverly once again injures her ankle and nearly collapses from exhaustion.

The six seniors and six juniors have mended their ties by the end of the year. The seniors invite the juniors to join Alpha Delta as "full-fledged members". From there the chapter titles tell the story: The Senior Prom, Senior Dinner, Commencement, and Auld Lang Syne. Jim Stanton and Tommy Chandler (another old friend) appear at the prom festivities, and Beverly again rebuffs Jim's advances. The senior dinner at Weller's features a speech by Shirley, reformed valedictorian, and a paean by Beverly to "the ideals and traditions" of Vernon College. Commencement ensues the following week, marking "the end of Senior Road". Beverly resolves to "devote my time to stories", perhaps "even try to write a play". Shirley's aim is to forsake the "endless teas and . . . boresome people" of society and pursue a career on the stage. "Lois wants to sketch", while Rosalie "would like to go to a conservatory and continue her music".

The final chapter, Auld Lang Syne, opens back in Renville. Jim has "unenthusiastically" accepted "a job in South America" to construct a "canal of some sort", a commitment of up to a year that will prevent him from wooing Beverly. The department of love is more gracious to Tommy, who announces to the group that "Anne has promised to marry me". "Three weeks later the little church on the hill was the scene of the simple but impressive ceremony that joined the two young people together for all time". The newly expanded Alpha Delta Sorority, along with the Lucky Circle, all join in the festivities before Anne and Tommy depart on honeymoon to "the Golden west". Lenora declares that she will never settle down, insisting that she wants 'the life of a sailor' with a new lover in every town.

=== Beverly Gray at the World's Fair ===
"The girls went to see the show in the lagoon theater".

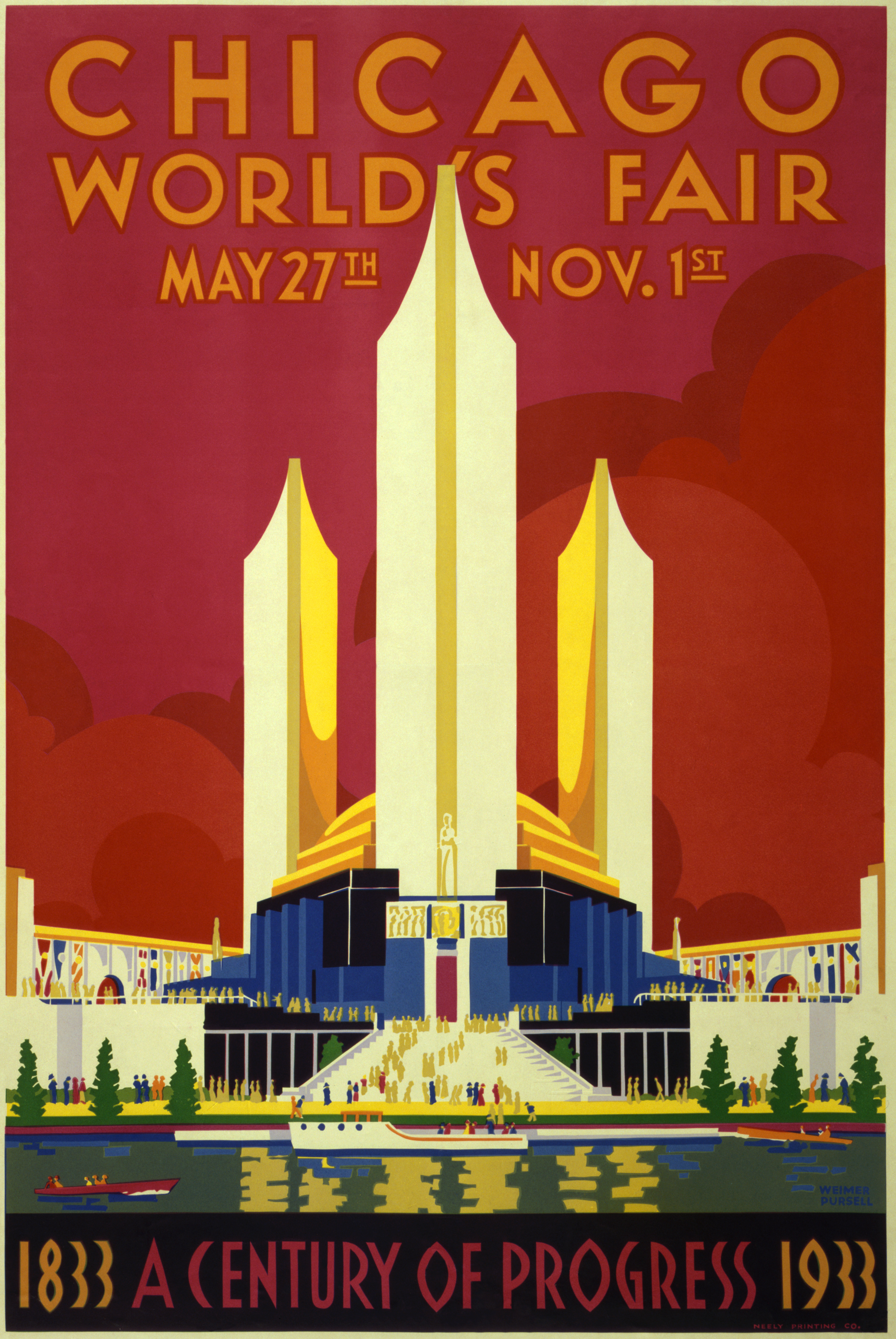
1933–34 Chicago World's Fair poster

Beverly Gray at the World's Fair, the sixth work by Blank, was issued for a short window from 1935 to 1938 before being dropped from the series. Because of fears that the book's setting would seem dated, publication of World's Fair was ceased after Grosset & Dunlap acquired the rights to the Beverly Gray books in 1938. Due to this limited printing run it is the scarcest of the 26 books.

World's Fair sees Beverly travel with a coterie of friends to the 1933–34 Chicago World's Fair. After Lois departs to Paris, where she has won "an art contest" with "a year's free study" as the prize, Lenora and Connie travel by train to visit Virginia, who lives in Chicago with her aunt and uncle. Although Beverly initially has to stay behind and work, the very next day her editor assigns her to write "a series of feature articles" on the fair for "the Sunday magazine section". She flies out that day with Larry, who is coincidentally headed to Chicago, "and then points West", for his work with the Secret Service.

Some days after joining forces in Chicago, the four girls witness the murder of a high diver, Paul Graham, during a show at the lagoon theater. Paul fails to surface following his "famous three somersault dive", and it emerges that he was "shot with a high powered air rifle". Suspicion falls on John Cummings, described as the "best friend" of the Grahams and their late uncle, and for whom Beverly harbors immediate misgivings. Lenora think that "there is something about him" and she mistrusts him. Lenora resolves to "follow him like his shadow" with her "Ciné-Kodak eight", and soon thereafter films him loosening the wires on a trapeze about to be used by Paul's sister, June. Before the girls can take the footage to the police, Paul's brother George is attacked by lion and suffers a "few scratches" after somebody "file[s] the lock" on a lion cage where he works as a trainer. This is not the last lion attack in the book, for towards the end of the book another one manages to slip out and sink its claws "deep into [Beverly's] shoulder" before it can be subdued. Despite the footage Cummings remains free, leading Beverly and Lenora to sneak into his hotel room in search of evidence. Hidden inside his chimney they discover a violin case, empty except for a single bullet.

Cummings sees them as they depart, however, and that night warns Beverly that "[i]f you play with fire you must expect to get burned". These words prove prescient the next day when, relaxing at Lake Geneva, the girls have their motorboat "rammed" by another and are forced to swim an unconscious Beverly back to shore. Before impact Beverly catches "a clear, distinct glimpse of the face of the man at the wheel of the boat", and believes it to be Cummings. He is finally caught in the next chapter, after Beverly observes him leaving a pawn ticket in June's dressing room trunk. This appears to be an effort to frame her, for upon redemption of the ticket Beverly and Virginia are handed the murder weapon, "a gun, not small enough to be a revolver and not quite long enough for a rifle. . . . It looked like a sawed off shotgun". They take the gun to the police, where "[e]verything was carefully considered and they all agreed that Cummings was the murderer". He was left out of the will of the Grahams' uncle, it turns out, but stood to gain the share willed to Paul, June and George should anything have happened to all three. Officers are sent to arrest Cummings, who "confesse[s] when confronted with the evidences of his guilt". Beverly is left to "break the news" for her paper.

Several subplots share space with the murder of Paul Graham in World's Fair. Significant ink is expended on the many wonders and exhibits at the fair, some of it copied word for word from the fair's official guidebook, and Shirley's acting career encounters both downfall and revival. Beverly runs into Shirley on her first day in Chicago, discovering her to be "out of a job", with "scarcely any money and no friends". She can ill afford to eat and is about to be evicted, yet refuses to take any money from Beverly and moves out when she discovers Beverly has spoken to her landlord and paid the rent. Shirley's luck seems to change for the better, however, for later on Beverly receives the money in the mail with a note saying only "Thanks so much", and Virginia spots Shirley in a big limousine. Shirley turns out to be "Dale Arden", a former understudy who "stepped up and did the performance ten times better than the star" when "the star was suddenly taken ill on opening night". Shirley remembered the details slightly differently, relating in World Cruise that "the star suddenly broke her ankle the night before the opening". Later on Shirley herself is taken ill during a performance, collapsing due to exhaustion and overwork. Beverly prescribes her a trip to "get away" and "lounge lazily about in the sun", and Roger proposes "a trip around the world" on his yacht the Susabella. So is born the inspiration for Beverly Gray on a World Cruise, promising a "journey into alien lands" with "strange adventures amid new scenes and faces".

Originally published only a year after the fair ended, World's Fair brought to bear recent memories when released. By the time Grosset & Dunlap acquired the Beverly Gray series in 1938, however, the Chicago World's Fair was receding further into the past and preparations had begun for the 1939–40 New York World's Fair. Blank's editor wrote her in a 1941 letter that said: "Because [Beverly Gray at the World's Fair] specifically referred to the Chicago Fair and work on the New York Fair was underway, we felt that readers might be disappointed to discover that Beverly had been to the old fair – not the New York one". As a general policy, her editor went on, when Grosset foresaw "a long and steady sale", it sought to "avoid having anything in the stories that might date them". This policy would not prove to withstand the entry by the United States into World War II, but was sufficient to end publication of the original sixth work in the Beverly Gray series. The original seventh and eighth works, Beverly Gray on a World Cruise and Beverly Gray in the Orient, were renumbered 6 and 7. Beverly Gray on a Treasure Hunt, the first work published by Grosset, became book number 8.

For collectors of the Beverly Gray series, World's Fair is the most challenging and expensive book to acquire. World's Fair went through multiple printings by A. L. Burt from 1935 to 1937, and was thereafter reprinted by Blue Ribbon Books from 1937 to 1938. It is thus theoretically no scarcer than any other Beverly Gray A. L Burt or Blue Ribbon edition, (excepting the first four works, which began printing one year earlier), and considerably more common than certain other series published by A. L. Burt.

=== Beverly Gray on a World Cruise ===
Originally published as the seventh title in the Beverly Gray series, World Cruise was recast as the sixth work when Grosset & Dunlap acquired the series and halted publication of World's Fair. This cancelled title nevertheless continued to exert its pull on the succeeding books; World's Fair began a trend towards plots focused on travel as much as mystery, a trend reflected, and intensified, by World Cruise. Beverly and Co. prepare to set sail aboard the yacht Susabella as World Cruise opens, embarking upon a four-book circumnavigation of the globe. Mystery and adventure continue to remain important themes—a villainous count threatens the party after Jim comes into possession of one-half of a treasure map, and Beverly suffers the usual barrage of misfortune—yet in most other respects the book resembles a travelogue. From New York to Jerusalem, 251 pages transport Beverly nearly a quarter of the way across the world, while intervening stops, in London, Le Havre, Paris, Flanders Field, Berne, Grindelwald, Cairo, and Bethlehem, serve to celebrate the far places of the world.

The title of Beverly Gray on a World Cruise is an accurate one. Joining Roger Garrett and his aunt Miss Ernwood—"a nominal chaperone, who never gets in the way of the story"—on his yacht the Susabella, Beverly, Lenora, Shirley, Jim and Paul Benson set sail to London with no final destination or end date in sight. There they are met by Roger's friend Sir Terence "Terry" Cartwright, "a jolly, good-looking young man" who "wore his clothes well, had money, was not a bit uppish with his title, and had excellent taste in neckties". Beverly, "a working girl" who constantly runs "uptown, downtown, and across town" while reporting for the Tribune, is initially hesitant; though she earns "an income from [her] short stories", her financial stability depends on the sale of her manuscript, already rejected once, to a publisher. Ultimately the second rejection actually spurs her to "revolt". Quitting her job mid-week, Beverly elects "to hang her conscience in a dark closet and forget about it". Three days later the Susabella leaves New York. That day Beverly narrowly escapes a "menacing" shark, but the real excitement waits three more days, for when a storm washes Jim overboard. Despair is particularly acute for Beverly, whom Shirley believes "has been in love with Jim all the time—and didn't know it". Mourning turns to joy with the passage of another three days, at which point Jim, having been discovered by a "tramp steamer" apparently sans radio set, (Note: Whether or not Jim might have been picked up by a ship without a radio set is an issue of debate in the days after he falls overboard. Shirley hopefully suggests that "[p]erhaps he was picked up by a ship that hasn't a wireless", to which Beverly responds that "[e]very ship these days has a wireless". The issue at the root of Beverly's assertion was actually litigated four years previous to World Cruise in a now famous case, The T. J. Hooper.) meets the Susabella at the London docks.

The story of Jim's rescue and reappearance fuels the remainder of World Cruise, and much of the succeeding two books. As he tells it, after being swept over the railing by a "terribly big wave", the yacht day hidden in a fog. Some hours later, clinging to a piece of driftwood, he was rescued by the a crew that seemed drawn "from the pirate stories". Jim was locked into a cabin, his contact limited to "Slim", a crew member who "had only signed on as steward to work his way back to England". Slim confided that he is in possession of a treasure map, and, fearing for his life should his secret be discovered, found it prudent to bestow upon Jim one half of the map until they set foot on dry land. The first night in London thus sees Jim and six others disembarking for "The Purple Dragon", a seedy bar in Limehouse, "hotbed of crime, river noises, and frequent fogs". Slim enters the bar; the lights go out; "[s]creams, angry shouts, . . . a heavy groan and a thud" follow; and when the lights come one, Slim is on the floor with "a knife through his heart. Murdered!" Slim's half of the map falls into the permanent possession of Beverly's party, promising adventure and the search for treasure.

The remainder of World Cruise consists of travels through six countries while followed by those seeking Slim's half of the map. London sees Beverly, Shirley and Lenora go to the "famous Rag Market", a story plagiarized from Mabel Herbert Urner, and Beverly runs into one Count Alexis de Frachiny, whose charm quickly turns Jim jealous; his charm is such that when she stumbles into him again that night, she accepts his invitation to go dancing and does not return to the Susabella until "early in the morning". A boat and a train ride later in Paris, the eight Susabella passengers reunite with Lois, "studying art in Paris" on a scholarship, and Anselo, who upon a chance encounter in a café informs Beverly he has "not seen the gypsies since the night your friends rescued you" in Junior, and has "played my violin" since. They also run into Count Alexis multiple times. When Beverly and Lenora forget the name of their hotel he conveniently shows up, and even more conveniently saw them "this afternoon when I registered" at the same hotel, and when Beverly espies the Count "lounging in a doorway across the street" through Anselo's window, she blows off Aneslo's warning that "[h]e is a dangerous man" without thinking to ask why. An Armistice Day trip to Flanders Field finds the grave site of Roger's brother George, who "ran off and joined the Army" at seventeen, while a trip to Switzerland provides mild adventure when Beverly and Shirley are lost in a snowstorm in Grindelwald. Beverly there sees "all the sights that were to bee seen": the "famous fountains, the Bear, the 'Man who eats the children', and the Sharpshooter; the old Bear Gardens; the five-hundred-year old Cathedral with the beautiful carvings and tinted glass", not to mention Count Alexis, who again pops up unannounced. The Count finally tips his hand back in France when, driving Beverly to Le Havre to embark for Cairo, they weather a storm in a country château. Beverly both overhears him discussing his attempts to get the treasure map from her, and finally recognizes him as a man she saw at "The Purple Dragon" shortly before Slim's murder.

== Beverly's tribulations ==
Kidnappings

- by Hermit Woman (Freshman, ch. 12)
- by smugglers (Sophomore, ch. 8)
- by gypsies (Junior, ch. 3)
- by ransomers (attempted) (Senior, ch. 17)

Wild animals

- Pawed by bear (Freshman, ch. 15)
- Clawed by lion (World's Fair, ch. 14)
- Pursued by shark (World Cruise, ch. 4)

Injuries

- Sprains ankle (Freshman, ch. 10)
- Knocked unconscious (Freshman, ch. 20)
- Breaks rib and arm (Sophomore, ch. 21)
- Twists ankle (Junior, ch. 13)
- Sprains ankle (Senior, ch. 19)

Menaced with weapon

- Held at gunpoint (Freshman, ch. 27)
- Held at knifepoint (Sophomore, ch. 17)
- Dodges throwing knives (Junior, ch. 13)
- Dodges bullet (Senior, ch. 17)
- Held at gunpoint (Senior, ch. 17)
- Dodges knife (World Cruise, ch. 7)

Assorted assaults

- Attacked by thief (Sophomore, ch. 16)
- Choked unconscious (Sophomore, ch. 19)
- Knifes gypsy (Junior, ch. 11)
- Struck unconscious (Junior, ch. 11)
- Rammed unconscious (World's Fair, ch. 11)

Elemental misfortune

- Lost in blizzard (Freshman, ch. 9)
- Rescues Shirley from fire (Freshman, ch. 23)
- Falls through ice (Junior, ch. 17)
- Lost in blizzard (World Cruise, ch. 11)
- Lost in sandstorm (World Cruise, ch. 17)

Other

- Trapped in smugglers' den (Sophomore, ch. 19)
- In plane crash (Sophomore, ch. 21)
- Arrested (Senior, ch. 17)
- Witnesses murder (World's Fair, ch. 6)
- Witnesses murder (World Cruise, ch. 7)
- Drugged (attempted) (World Cruise, ch. 13)
- Almost hit by car (World Cruise, ch. 17)

== Publication history ==
The Beverly Gray series was published in the United States from 1934 to 1955. Four publishers were responsible for the series output during this time: A. L. Burt (1934–1937), Blue Ribbon Books (1937–1938), Grosset & Dunlap (1938–1954) and McLoughlin Bros. (1955).

=== A. L. Burt (1934–1937) ===
A. L. Burt was responsible for publishing the first eight titles in the series, from Beverly Gray, Freshman through Beverly Gray in the Orient. The first four titles were copyrighted on June 1, 1934 and issued concurrently as a "breeder set", a common practice at the time. Books five and six (Career and World's Fair) followed in similar fashion, both copyrighted on June 14, 1934, while the next two works followed in yearly intervals. Although A. L. Burt's president retired and sold the company to Blue Ribbon Books in early March 1937, the copyright for the final book published by A. L. Burt, Beverly Gray in the Orient, was actually issued on April 15 of that year.

The A. L. Burt editions had a uniform appearance. Approximately 8 inches tall and 1.5 inches thick, they were composed of gray cloth boards with black lettering, and supplied with light blue endpapers with an etching of buildings. The publisher was denoted on the lower spine as "A. L. BURT/COMPANY".

=== Blue Ribbon Books (1937–1938) ===
Blue Ribbon Books dust jacket to Beverly Gray at the World's Fair. The rectangular yellow box at the bottom of the spine was added to cover up "A. L. Burt Company".

Blue Ribbon Books announced the purchase of A. L. Burt on March 4, 1937. Robert de Graff, president of Blue Ribbon from May 28 of the previous year until February of the next, described the purchase as "supplementary", bringing together "the fiction list of the A. L. Burt Company and the non-fiction books issued under the Blue Ribbon imprint". Taking over approximately 2,000 titles from A. L. Burt, Blue Ribbon indicated its intention to continue "the Burt name" on "fiction and juvenile titles"; each Beverly Gray book was thus referred to as "A Burt Book" on the title page. The company had to that point been a reprint specialist, and, at least vis-à-vis the Beverly Gray series, its specialty did not change. No new titles were commissioned for the series by Blue Ribbon, although from 1937 to 1938 they reprinted the eight works already issued by A. L. Burt. From April 15, 1937 (Orient, A. L. Burt) until October 15, 1938 (Treasure Hunt, Grosset & Dunlap) it would be seventeen months until another Beverly Gray book was copyrighted.

The initial Beverly Gray books issued by Blue Ribbon used the same stock as the A. L. Burt editions. The books were bound in cloth boards of the same color and size, while the copyright remained under the name of A. L. Burt. The only changes were to the spine, where "B U R T" replaced "A. L. BURT/COMPANY", and to the title page, where "A Burt Book/BLUE RIBBON BOOKS, Inc./New York" replaced "A. L. BURT COMPANY, publishers/New York Chicago".

Blue Ribbon began using colored boards after the initial printing runs with gray boards, perhaps reflecting the exhaustion of binding materials acquired from A. L. Burt. The size and composition of the books remained the same.

=== Grosset and Dunlap (1938–1954) ===
Grosset & Dunlap purchased the "entire juvenile business" of Blue Ribbon Books in mid-1938. By that point Grosset was publishing such successful series as Nancy Drew, The Hardy Boys, The Dana Girls, Tom Swift Sr., and Judy Bolton as part of "one of the largest and most active juvenile lists in the business". The Beverly Gray series would last until 1954 with Grosset & Dunlap, then see one final year of publication with its McLoughlin Bros. division.

With the purchase of Blue Ribbon Books came "their stock" of Beverly Gray books.

=== McLoughlin Bros. (1955) ===
In June 1954, Grosset & Dunlap purchased McLoughlin Bros, a publisher of toy books since 1828. McLoughlin became a division of Grosset & Dunlap, with the Clover Books imprint used to publish the Beverly Gray series. Clover Books was primarily used as "a reprint line for juvenile titles that were still profitable enough to merit publication in a cheap format but were no longer selling sufficiently well to continue in their original hardback edition" and the switch to this imprint portended the fate of the Beverly Gray series. Only one more book would be published before the series was cancelled.

McLoughlin printed Beverly Gray's Surprise, the final work in the series, in 1955. It additionally reprinted the previous nine books (Journey through Scoop), which had originally been issued by Grosset & Dunlap. The ten books were numbered from G-16 (Journey) to G-25 (Surprise), with G-1 through G-15, representing the books not reprinted by McLoughlin, left unassigned.

=== International editions ===
From 1944 until 1970, translations of several Beverly Gray books were published in Iceland and in Norway. Twelve works were initially published by the Icelandic publisher Norðri. The first of these, Beverly Gray nýliði (Freshman), was translated by Gudjon Gudjonsson, with the eleven succeeding titles translated by Kristmundur Bjarnason. The first four translations (Freshman through Senior) were later reprinted by another Icelandic publisher, Iðunn. Either intentionally or mistakenly, both Norðri and Iðunn used the pen name "Clarie Blank" rather than Blank's true first name. Between the publication and republication of these Icelandic translations, seven Norwegian titles were issued by the publisher Forlagshuset.

==== Icelandic titles ====
Dust jacket to Beverly Gray í III bekk (Iðunn, 1969)

#	Title	English title		Pub. by Norðri	Pub. by Iðunn
1	Beverly Gray nýliði	1	Freshman	1944	1967
2	Beverly Gray í II bekk	2	Sophomore	1945	1968
3	Beverly Gray í III bekk	3	Junior	1946	1969
4	Beverly Gray í IV bekk	4	Senior	1946	1970
5	Beverly Gray fréttaritari	10	Reporter	1947	N/A
6	Beverly Gray á ferðalagi	16	Journey	1948	N/A
7	Beverly Gray í gullleit	8	Treasure Hunt	1948	N/A
9*	Ástir Beverly Gray	11	Romance	1949	N/A
10	Beverly Gray í New York	5	Career	1949	N/A
11	Beverly Gray í Suður-Ameríku	12	Quest	1950	N/A
12	Beverly Gray vinnur nýja sigra	13	Problem	1950	N/A
13	Beverly Gray og upplýsingaþjónustan	14	Adventure	1951	N/A

*Although the books were numbered, no #8 was ever issued.

==== Norwegian titles ====
Title	English Title		Pub.
Beverly Gray på college	4	Senior	1960
Beverly Grays hemmelighet	21	Secret	1960
Beverly Gray det forsvunne maleriet	23	Discovery	1961
Beverly Gray på egne ben	5	Career	1961
Beverly Gray som journalist	10	Reporter	1961
Beverly Gray og den mystiske rytter	18	Mystery	1962
Beverly Gray og den stjålne medaljongen	16	Journey	1962

== Bibliography ==
Works by Clair Blank

Beverly Gray

- Blank, Clair (1934). Beverly Gray, Freshman. A. L. Burt Company.
- Blank, Clair (1934). Beverly Gray, Sophomore. A. L. Burt Company.
- Blank, Clair (1934). Beverly Gray, Junior. A. L. Burt Company.
- Blank, Clair (1934). Beverly Gray, Senior. A. L. Burt Company.
- Blank, Clair (1935). Beverly Gray at the World's Fair. A. L. Burt Company.
- Blank, Clair (1936). Beverly Gray on a World Cruise. A. L. Burt Company.
- Blank, Clair (1938). Beverly Gray on a Treasure Hunt. Grosset & Dunlap.

The Adventure Girls

- Blank, Clair (1936). The Adventure Girls at K Bar O. A. L. Burt Company.
- Blank, Clair (1936). The Adventure Girls in the Air. A. L. Burt Company.
- Blank, Clair (1936). The Adventure Girls at Happiness House. A. L. Burt Company

Other

- Blank, Clair (1940). Lover Come Back. Gramercy.
- Blank, Clair (1941). Linda Ross at Hamilton. Unpublished manuscript.

Secondary sources

- Abreu, John E. (May 1984). "Beverly Gray, Juvenile Soap: A Golden Anniversary Retrospective (part 1)". Yellowback Library.
- Abreu, John E. (July 1984). "Beverly Gray, Juvenile Soap: A Golden Anniversary Retrospective (part 2)". Yellowback Library.
- Allcock, Doug (June 2009). "A Peek at Beverly Gray". Yellowback Library.
- Axe, John (July 2000). The Secret of Collecting Girls' Series Books. Hobby House Press. ISBN 978-0875885773.
- Axe, John (July 2002). All About Collecting Girls' Series Books. Hobby House Press. ISBN 978-0875886350.
- Bourke, Sean (July 1995). "American Juvenile Series Books in European Editions". Yellowback Library.
- Chenu, Julius "Bob" (Jan 1982). "Beverly Gray Series, by Clair Blank". Yellowback Library.
- Enright, John M. (Mar 1990). "It's Gray, It Has Two Legs, And It Travels Around the World". Mystery & Adventure Series Review.
- Grossman, Anita Susan (Jan 1989). "Mystery of Clair Blank". Yellowback Library.
- Grossman, Anita Susan (Dec 1989). "Clair Blank and Her Publishers: A Look at the Written Record". Yellowback Library.
- Grossman, Anita Susan (April 1994). "A Note on McLoughlin Brothers and Clover Books". Yellowback Library.
- Grossman, Anita Susan (October 1998). "Lover Come Back: A Synopsis Of Clair Blank's Forgotten Novel". The Whispered Watchword.
