= Radio Boys =

Radio Boys was the title of three series of juvenile fiction books published by rival companies in the United States in the 1920s:

- Grosset & Dunlap - authored by "Allen Chapman", a Stratemeyer Syndicate pseudonym - 13 titles. The best known, and biggest seller of the three series:
  - The Radio Boys' First Wireless or Winning the Ferberton Prize
  - The Radio Boys at Ocean Point or The Message that Saved the Ship
  - The Radio Boys at the Sending Station or Making Good in the Wireless Room (1922)
  - The Radio Boys at Mountain Pass or The Midnight Call for Assistance
  - The Radio Boys Trailing a Voice or Solving a Wireless Mystery
  - The Radio Boys with the Forest Rangers or The Great Fire on Spruce Mountain
  - The Radio Boys with the Iceberg Patrol or Making Safe the Ocean Lanes
  - The Radio Boys with the Flood Fighters or Saving the City in the Valley
  - The Radio Boys on Signal Island or Watching for the Ships of Mystery
  - The Radio Boys in Gold Valley or The Mystery of the Deserted Mining Camp
  - The Radio Boys Aiding the Snowbound or Starvation Days at Lumber Run (1928)
  - The Radio Boys on the Pacific or Shipwrecked on An Unknown Island (1928)
  - The Radio Boys to the Rescue or The Search for the Barmore Twins (1930)
- A. L. Burt Company - authored by Gerald Breckenridge - 10 titles. Unlike the other books in the series, which were published under pseudonyms, there appears to have really been a Gerald Breckenridge, a former journalist. Some of his papers were donated to Auburn University. According to radio listings that were published in the New York Times and other newspapers, Breckenridge was a guest on radio station Newark's WJZ three times during October 1922, reading selections from his latest "Radio Boys" book
- M. A. Donohue & Co. - various authors - 6 titles

There was also a related Radio Girls series, another Stratemeyer Syndicate product, published by Cupples & Leon and authored by "Margaret Penrose".

All of these series were launched seemingly simultaneously in 1922 and the earliest books in each series were by far the biggest sellers, often incorporating details on how to build a crystal set (a simple radio receiver). Later installments tended toward routine action adventure.
