= Otwell Johnson =

16th-century English businesspeople

Otwell Johnson was a successful merchant in England during the reign of Henry VIII. His chronicle is one of the main sources detailing the execution of Henry's fifth wife, Katherine Howard.
