= Bernard Ottwell Binns =

British agriculturalist (1898-1953)

Sir Bernard Ottwell Binns KBE
- Born: 16 July 1898
- Died: 8 December 1953 (aged 55)
- Education: Brasenose College, Oxford
- Occupations: Agriculturalist and colonial administrator
- Children: 1 daughter

Sir Bernard Ottwell Binns KBE (16 July 1898 – 8 December 1953) was a British agriculturalist and colonial administrator.

== Early life and education ==
Binns was born on 16 July 1898. He was educated at Bury Grammar School and Brasenose College, Oxford with a scholarship in classics and took his degree in 1928.

Binns served in the European War 1914–1918, and was 2nd lieutenant on the General List of the British Army in 1917. From 1917 to 1919, he was in the Indian Army Reserve, and from 1919 to 1923, was attached to the 9th Delhi Infantry and the 37th Dogra Regiment of the Indian Army in Britain.

== Career ==
Binns passed the Indian Civil Service competitive examination in 1922, and entered the Indian Civil Service. The following year he was posted to Burma, spent his early career mostly in Finance and Revenue Departments, and rose to deputy Secretary of the Finance Department, Burma in 1935.

In 1936, Binns was appointed Commissioner of Settlements and Land Records, Burma and dealt with problems of agrarian settlement, land taxation and administration, and rice production. From 1941–42 , he was secretary to the Governor of Burma and just prior to the Japanese invasion, was appointed commissioner of the Sagaing Division. From 1942 to 1945, he was joint secretary of the Reconstruction Department, and from 1945 to 1947 was Financial Commissioner Lands and Rural Department. In 1949, he retired from the Indian Civil Service.

In 1949, Binns joined the United Nations Food and Agricultural Organisation (FAO) as an expert on land tenure, land administration and settlement, and agricultural production, and attended various international conferences on agricultural matters. He made considerable studies of agrarian problems, and his papers were issued as official publications by the FAO. Binns was a Fellow of the Royal Society of Arts (FRSA) and a Fellow of the Royal Geographic Society (FRGS).

== Publications ==
Revenue Settlement Report, Amherst District (1930-33); and Pegu District (1932-34); Agricultural Economy in Burma (1943) (all official publications of the Government of Burma); Consolidation of Fragmented Agricultural Holdings (1950); Land Settlement for Agriculture (1951); Agricultural Credit for Small Farmers (1951); Cadastral Surveys and Registration of Rights in Land (1953); Large Centrally Operated Agricultural Estates (1953) (all official publications of the FAO).

== Personal life and death ==
Binns married Dorothy Ambrose in 1928 and they had a daughter.

Binns died on 8 December 1953.

== Honours ==
Binns was appointed Officer of the Order of the British Empire (OBE) in 1941, promoted to a Knight Commander of the Order of the British Empire (KBE) in the 1948 New Year Honours.
