= Blue Ribbon Books =

American publishing house

Blue Ribbon Books was an American publishing house established in Garden City, New York, in 1930 "by a consortium of publishers (Dodd & Mead, Harcourt & Brace, Harper, and Little, Brown) as a reprint publisher to compete with Grosset & Dunlap".

Alfred Harcourt and Eugene Reynal were connected with its management. In 1933, Reynal assumed complete control of the company. In 1937, Blue Ribbon acquired the list of the A. L. Burt publishing house and it continued publishing some of A. L. Burt's titles, terming them "A Burt Book." In 1939, Blue Ribbon Books sold its assets and reproduction rights to Doubleday, Doran & Company.

== Pop-up books ==
The firm was also known for its innovative production of children's books featuring movable elements, particularly pop-ups. It is recognized as the first U.S. publisher to trademark the term "pop-up" for its Illustrated Pop-up Editions. Blue Ribbon Books collaborated with Harold B. Lentz, who was instrumental in the success of their pop-up books. Lentz provided not only the artwork but also the engineering behind the intricate pop-up mechanisms, making these books highly sought after by collectors. Some of the most famous titles produced by Blue Ribbon include *The "Pop-Up" Pinocchio* (1932) and *The "Pop-Up" Cinderella* (1933), both featuring detailed illustrations and interactive paper mechanics.

Blue Ribbon Books also made a significant impact with their Disney-themed pop-up books, which helped bring classic Disney stories to life through interactive illustrations. These editions included iconic titles such as *The "Pop-Up" Mickey Mouse* and *The "Pop-Up" Donald Duck*, which became highly popular among children and collectors alike.

Blue Ribbon Books' pop-up editions remain highly collectible due to their historical significance and craftsmanship, marking a key moment in the development of children's interactive literature in the United States. The publishing house is remembered for popularizing movable books in the U.S. market during the 1930s and establishing a lasting legacy in the genre of pop-up books.

== Book series ==
- Best Known Works (implicit series)
- Blue Ribbon Specials
- Famous Books for Young Americans
- Pop-Up Books
- Rainbow Bindings (AKA Rainbow Editions)
- Waddle Books

== Imprints ==
- Book League of America
- Halcyon House
