= A. L. Burt =

Defunct New York book publisher

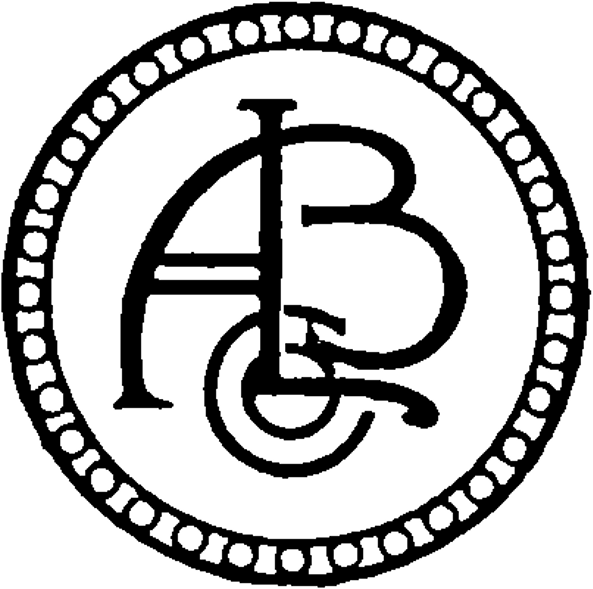

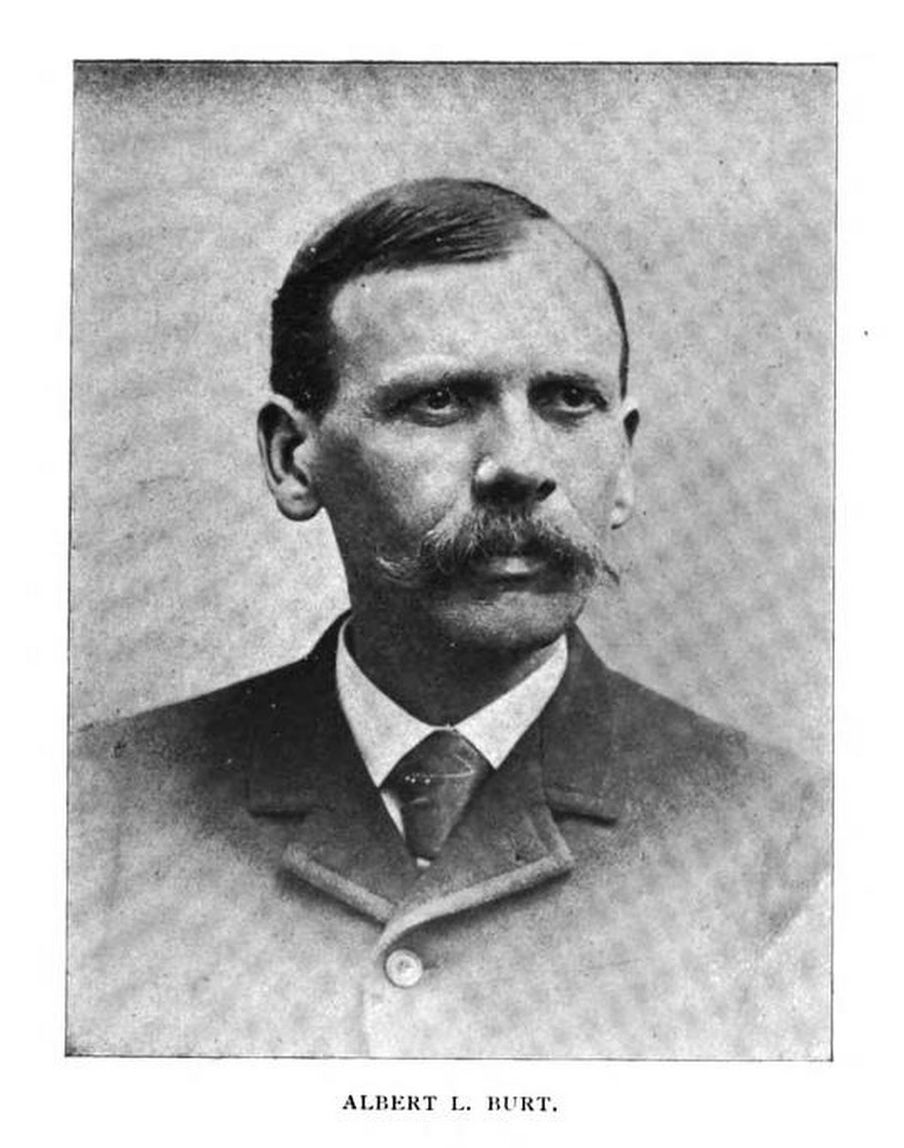
- c. 1891 portrait of Albert Levi Burt
- Type: Publishing companies
- Founded: 1883
- Defunct: 1937
- Headquarters: New York City, U.S.

A. L. Burt (incorporated in 1902 as A. L. Burt Company) was a US book publishing house from 1883 until 1937. It was founded by Albert Levi Burt, a 40-year-old from Massachusetts who had come to recognize the demand for inexpensive reference works while working as a traveling salesman. The company began by reprinting home reference works and reprints of popular and classic fiction, before expanding into the field of children's works, particularly series books.

A. L. Burt published both reprints and first editions, and targeted both adult and juvenile audiences. At the same time that it published works aimed at adults by authors such as Zane Grey, Harold Bell Wright, and Joseph C. Lincoln, it targeted the juvenile market with works by such authors as Horatio Alger, James Otis, Harry Castlemon, and Edward S. Ellis. The company repeatedly adapted with the market; it entered a popular paperback market, refocused on hardcovers when the paperback market became saturated, and in 1911, in an effort to compete with the Stratemeyer Syndicate, began issuing inexpensive juvenile series books.

Albert Burt died in 1913 with a sizable estate, after which the business was continued by his three sons, who each took an equal share. They continued the newfound emphasis on series books, pursuing both reprints rights and new works. The company met particular success with series influenced by contemporaneous influences and trends; nearly two dozen books in The Boy Allies series centered around World War I, and upon the war's end the company's new offers explored topics such as aviation and wireless radio. Although sales and titles declined with the Great Depression, the company continued to issue popular works, including the Beverly Gray series by Clair Blank, and titles by Howard R. Garis. Eventually, with an eye towards retirement, Albert Burt's sons sold the company to Blue Ribbon Books in 1937. Two years later, Blue Ribbon Books itself sold its assets and reproduction rights to Doubleday.

== Albert Levi Burt ==
A. L. Burt Company was named after its founder, Albert Levi Burt. Burt was born in Belchertown, Massachusetts in 1843. He was one of fourteen children born to Vila Burt (née Randall) and Levi Burt, a utility man and musician, and the grandson of Reuben Burt, the last surviving veteran of the American Revolutionary War in Hampden County. He was also an eighth-generation New Englander from a prolific family, tracing his ancestry to Henry Burt's arrival in Massachusetts around 1638.

Burt grew up on a farm with limited resources and schooling. As a family genealogy put it, other than four months each winter at a small district school, "the rest of the year the farm itself was the alpha and omega of educational opportunities." Burt's father died on January 26, 1860, when Burt was seventeen. Burt moved to Amherst, where he worked as a clerk in a general store for fifty dollars a year along with his board; two years later he moved to Hartford, Connecticut, working for several years as a traveling salesman for a publishing house. During this time, according to the genealogy, Burt came to understand the market that existed for inexpensive artistic, literary, and household books, which many could not afford.

In his personal life, Burt married Sarah Prentice Burt in Gilead, Connecticut, in 1872. They had three sons: Harry Prentice Burt (born c. 1874), Frederick Andrew Burt (born c. 1876), and Edward Fuller Burt (born c. 1878). He was a Republican, and according to an obituary in The Brooklyn Daily Eagle had a "retiring disposition"; he was a member of only one organization, Plymouth Church, of which he served for years as a trustee. In 1891, having found publishing success in New York, he donated 100 volumes of his works to Belchertown's Clapp Memorial Library. He was also an authority on bass and trout fishing, and wrote on the subject. Burt eventually gave up his active work in May 1913—"much against his will," per the obituary. After a months-long illness he died in his home at 178 Brooklyn Avenue on 28 December 1913, and was buried in the Cemetery of the Evergreens. His estate was valued at $191,605.71 (equivalent to $6,200,000 in 2025).

== History ==
=== Early years, 1883–1902 ===
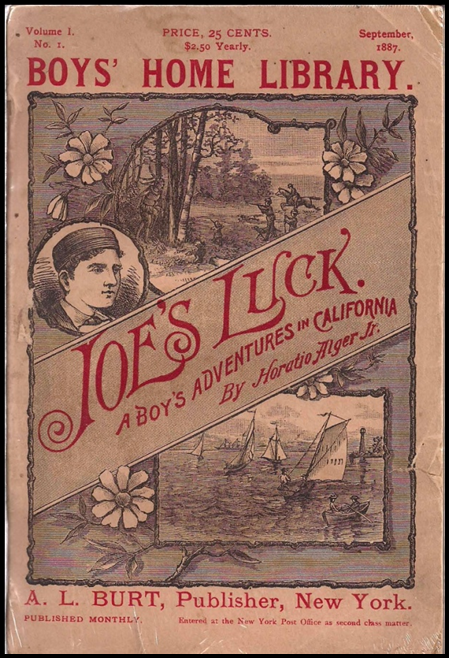
Volume 1, number 1 of A. L. Burt's Boys' Home Library, a September 1887 first edition by Horatio Alger

Albert Levi Burt began his book-publishing efforts in 1883, although A. L. Burt Company was not officially incorporated until 1902. In 1883 Albert Burt moved to New York City, and soon thereafter began using a small office at 105 John Street to publish books. He initially focused on home reference works. His first publication was a reprint of The National Standard Dictionary, which contained some 40,000 words and 700 illustrative woodcuts. According to the family genealogy, for this work he poured the entirety of his $900 savings into typesetting—providing for paper, printing, and binding on credit—and within ten years had sold some 250,000 copies. Albert Burt followed the dictionary with The National Standard Encyclopedia and several works on household art and ladies' handicrafts, along with such titles as Law Without Lawyers, Household Recipes, Useful Knowledge, and The Family Physician. Late in the 1880s Albert Burt turned to inexpensive paperback fiction, which was then popular and would allow him to extend his reach, with his Manhattan Library line of books. He also wanted to publish so-called "good literature," and so at the same time began the Burt's Home Library line with 25 titles, eventually reaching 500.

In 1887, Albert Burt launched the Boys' Home Library line of juvenile paperbacks, with individual titles priced at 25 cents and a yearly subscription for $2.50; these appear to have been published concurrently with $1 hardcover editions of the same works. The titles, which included first editions as well as reprints, were by such authors as Horatio Alger, James Otis, Harry Castlemon, and Edward S. Ellis. The line comprised 24 titles, the first 19 issued monthly and the remaining quarterly. Seven were by Alger: Joe's Luck, Frank Fowler, the Cash Boy, Tom Temple's Career, Tom Thatcher's Fortune, The Errand Boy, Tom the Bootblack, and Tony the Hero. The first five of these were first editions, though all seven had earlier been serialized in New York Weekly. The final issue, Captured by Zulus by Otis—writing under the pen name Harry Prentice—was published in June 1890.

Albert Burt's business grew rapidly, and between 1883 and 1900 he moved into larger offices in lower Manhattan at least four times. He also began to focus on hardcover novels, a response to the saturation of the cheap paperback market; dime novels and other 10- and 15-cent publications were undercutting his own 25-cent titles.

=== Incorporation and series books, 1902–1937 ===
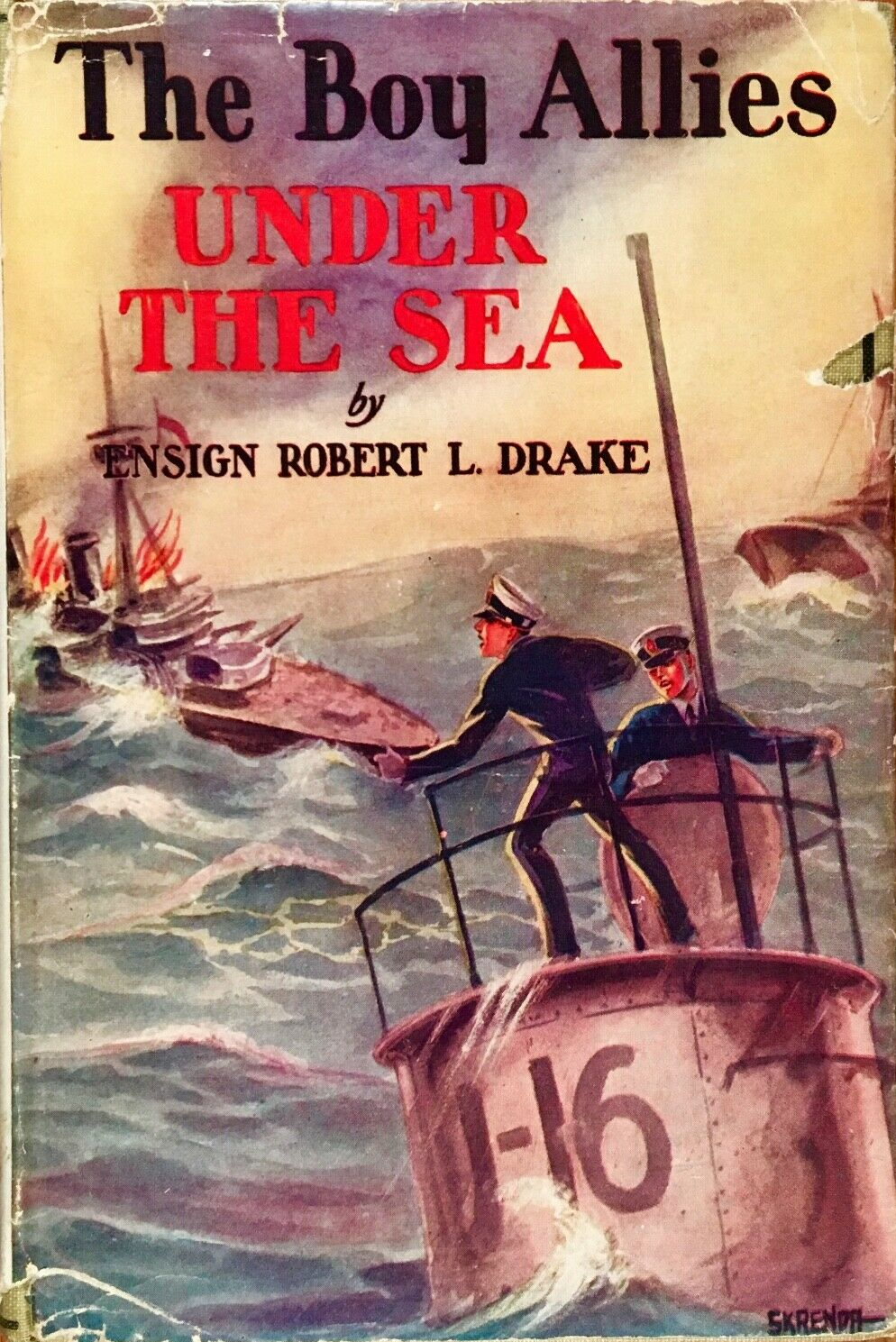
The Boy Allies Under the Sea

As A. L. Burt expanded, and after it incorporated in 1902, it began targeting both adult and juvenile markets. Zane Grey's second book, The Spirit of the Border, sold some 750,000 copies as an A. L. Burt first edition. Similar success was found with other adult authors, such as Harold Bell Wright and Joseph C. Lincoln. Meanwhile, the Chimney Corner Series began offering 50-cent juvenile hardcovers in 1905; 69 titles were issued under the series in slightly less than a decade, during which the price eventually rose to 60 cents. The company also issued a line of "illustrated cover" juvenile books between 1907 and 1911, with titles by authors such as Ellis, Otis, and Everett Tomlinson. With cheaper options readily available, the dollar books did not sell well; two first editions by Alger, In Search of Treasure and Wait and Win, are now scarce.

In 1911 A. L. Burt began issuing series books as part of an effort to compete with the Stratemeyer Syndicate, whose books were primarily published by Grosset & Dunlap and Cupples & Leon. An early effort simply repackaged four of the books from the dollar "illustrated cover" line: Wilmer M. Ely's books The Young Plume Hunters, The Boy Truckers, The Young Pearl Hunters, and The Young Treasure Seekers, originally published as standalone works between 1905 and 1911, became the Boy Chums Series, and sold for 40 cents each. They sold well, and were supplemented with four new titles. Albert Burt's sons, who were active in the company, continued with series books after their father's 1913 death; Harry Burt became president and treasurer, Fred Burt secretary, and Edward Burt assistant treasurer, with each receiving a third of their father's 510 shares in the company. They initially pursued reprint rights for existing works; series such as the Jack Lorimer Series, the Oakdale Series, the Boy Scouts Series, and the Border Boys Series were thus acquired and reprinted. New series were also introduced, such as the Bronco Rider Boys and the Big Five Motorcycle Boys under pseudonyms of St George Henry Rathborne. Particular success was had with World War I-themed series, such as The Boy Allies. The series—comprising 13 The Boy Allies of the Army books and 10 of The Boy Allies of the Navy—presents "the boy heroes practically winning the war single-handedly". The books were initially sold for 40 cents each, rising to 50, 60, and 75 cents over time. Other publications with similar themes included the Our Young Aeroplane Scouts Series by Horace Porter, and the postwar Boy Troopers Series, which was relatively unsuccessful.

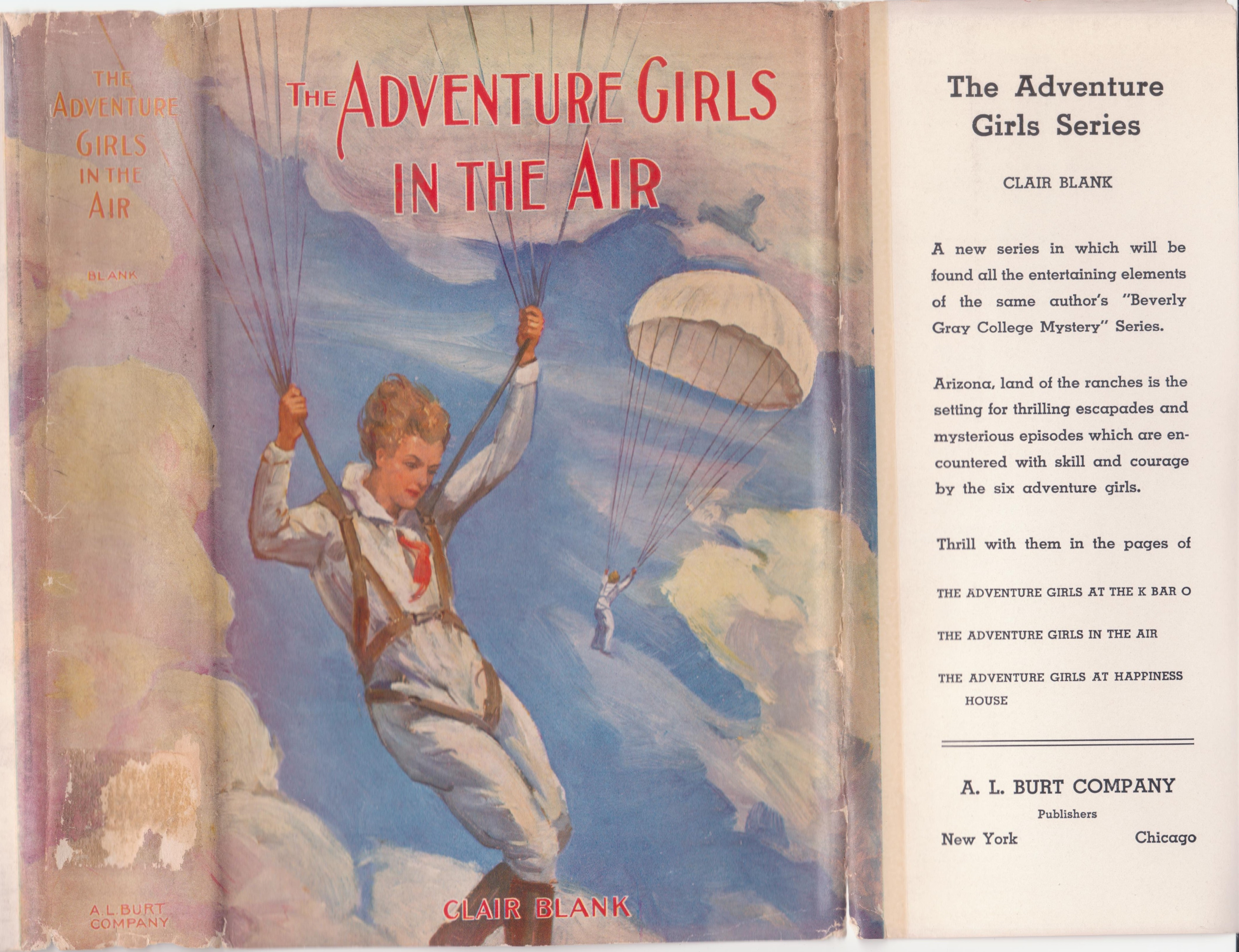
The Beverly Gray series by Clair Blank, who also wrote the three-book The Adventure Girls series, was A. L. Burt's most successful series of the 1930s despite starting publication in 1934.

After the war ended, A. L. Burt's series books adapted with the times. The Radio Boys Series, started in 1922, coincided with a popular interest in wireless radio—and with the Stratemeyer Syndicate's issuance of an identically titled series. Several series by Levi Parker Wyman also sold well, such as the ten-volume Golden Boys Series and the seven-volume Lakewood Boys Series. Wyman also wrote the eight-volume Hunniwell Boys Series, one of several series with an aviation theme. Major Henry H. Arnold, later to become General of the Army and General of the Air Force, contributed to the effort with the Bill Bruce Air Pilot Series.

As the Great Depression hit, A. L. Burt's sales, and line of publications, declined. The company still published a number of successful series, and even bought the printing plates and copyrights from George Sully and Company, which liquidated. The Beverly Gray mysteries, published from 1934 to 1937 by A. L. Burt, and later by Grosset & Dunlap, were the company's most successful series of the 1930s; The series was a veritable soap opera, with the many adventures of its protagonist including twenty-six kidnappings, seven attacks by wild animals, and three plane crashes. A. L. Burt also published the Rocket Rider Series by Howard R. Garis, who until Edward Stratemeyer's death had been a prolific author for the Stratemeyer Syndicate, writing many of the early Tom Swift books; the plots of the first two books, Rocket Riders Across the Ice and Rocket Riders Over the Desert, resemble plot outlines in the Syndicate's archives for unpublished Tom Swift books, and may have been intended as such before Garis left for A. L. Burt. The Rocket Riders Series was published in 1933–34, and during this time Garis's son Roger Garis also wrote for A. L. Burt, with the four-volume Outboard Boys Series. The company also published works by Van Powell, including the seven-volume Sky Scouts Series, and Capwell Wyckoff, including the ten-volume Mercer Boys Series and the four-volume Mystery Hunters Series.

Looking to retire, in 1933 Harry Burt began discussions about a sale with Blue Ribbon Books. In 1937 he finally sold; Blue Ribbon continued publishing some of A. L. Burt's titles, terming them "A Burt Book." In 1939, Blue Ribbon Books sold its assets and reproduction rights to Doubleday.

== Locations ==
A. L. Burt maintained at least six New York addresses, in addition to a Chicago office, during its history, progressively moving into larger spaces. The address listed in a book can is thus one manner of dating, within a range of years, a book's date of publication. Albert Burt remained at his small 105 John Street office from 1883 until at least November 1884, and by April 1885 had moved to 162 William Street. He remained there until moving to 56 Beekman Street, around June 1888, and staying until at least June 1890. In April 1899 he moved from 93–95 Reade Street to the Jones Building at 52–58 Duane Street, where he occupied the entire seventh floor. Burt remained there for some 15 years, before moving around 1914 to 114–120 East 23rd Street, where the company took up two floors and 35,000 square feet. Around this time the company also opened an office in Chicago, where it had long done business, at 506 South Wabash Avenue.

== Works and book series ==
A. L. Burt published more than 2,000 titles from 1883 to 1937, including as standalone works, as series of standalone works such as Burt's Home Library, and as series of related works such as The Adventure Girls. The following is a partial list of such works:

- The Adventure Girls (3 volumes, 1936)
- Adventurous Allens Series
- Adventure and Mystery Series
- Adventure and Mystery Series for Girls
- American Adventures Series
- Arden Blake Mystery Series (3 volumes, 1934)
- Aunt Amy's Animal Stories
- Betty Lee Series
- Beverly Gray College Mystery Series (8 volumes, 1934–1937)
- Bill Bruce Air Pilot Series
- Black Shadow Series
- Burt's Series of One Syllable Books
- The Boy Allies With the Army
- The Boy Allies With the Navy
- Boys of the Royal Mounted Police Series
- Camp Fire Boys Series
- Camp Fire Girls Series
- Daddy Series
- Exploration Series
- Famous Books for Young Americans
- Famous Elsie Books
- Favorite Stories for Children
- Girl Scouts Mystery Series (6 volumes, 1933–1936)
- Girl Scouts Series (10 volumes, 1922–1925)
- Jean Mary Series
- Linda Carlton Series (5 volumes, 1931–1933)
- Marjorie Dean Series
- Mary Lou (3 volumes, 1935)
- Mercer Boys Series
- Merilyn Series
- Mexican Mystery Stories for Girls (3 volumes, 1936)
- Mother Goose Series
- Mystery Boys Series
- Mystery Hunters Series
- Nancy Pembroke Series
- Outboard Motor Boat Series
- Radio Boys Series
- Rocket Riders Series
- Sky Scouts Series
- Uncle Wiggily Series

== Bibliography ==
- Abreu, John E. (May 1984). "Beverly Gray: Junior Soap, A Golden Anniversary Retrospective (part 1)". Yellowback Library (21).
- Burt, Henry Martyne & Burt, Silas Wright (1893). Early Days in New England: Life and Times of Henry Burt of Springfield and Some of His Descendants. Springfield, Massachusetts: Clark W. Bryan Company.
- "Burt Celebrates Fiftieth Anniversary". The Publishers' Weekly. CXXIV (3): 163–164. 15 July 1933.
- "Business Notes". The Publishers' Weekly. LV (17): 704–705. 29 April 1899.
- Chase, Bradford S. Horatio Alger Books Published by A.L. Burt. Enfield, Conn. (6 Sandpiper Rd., Enfield 06082): B.S. Chase, 1983. Print.
- Directory of Directors in the City of New York (11th ed.). New York City: Directory of Directors Company. 1911–1912.
- Directory of Directors in the City of New York (12th ed.). New York City: Directory of Directors Company. 1913–1914.
- Eastlack, Robert D. (November–December 2013). "Collecting Fez editions and other A.L. Burt publisher Alger editions" (PDF). Newsboy. LI (6): 3, 7–15.
- Gowen, William (September–October 2007). "Other Similar A.L. Burt Covers" (PDF). Newsboy. XLV (5): 6.
- Gowen, William (January–February 2009). "Worthy challenger to the Stratemeyer Syndicate: A.L. Burt's inexpensive series books, 1905–37" (PDF). Newsboy. XLVII (1): 8–12.
- Harris, Gale; Howson, Jean & Bradley, Betsy (February 1993). Pearson, Marjorie (ed.). African Burial Ground and the Commons Historic District: Designation Report (PDF). New York City: New York City Landmarks Preservation Commission. Archived (PDF) from the original on 24 December 2025.
- Kasper, Robert E. (July–August 2000). "The A. L. Burt Boys' Home Library" (PDF). Newsboy. XXXVIII (4): 3–10.
- Keeline, James D. (November–December 1992). "Mechanics of the Stratemeyer Syndicate" (PDF). Newsboy. XXX (6): 9–15.
- Leonard, John W., ed. (1907). Who's Who in New York City and State (3rd ed.). New York City: L. R. Hamersly & Company. p. 223.
- The National Standard Dictionary (Revised and enlarged ed.). New York City: A. L. Burt. 1883.
- "Obituary Notes: Albert L. Burt". The Publishers' Weekly. LXXXV (1): 21. 21 January 1914.
- "Spring Lines of the Publishers and Some of the Men Who Will Show Them". The Publishers' Weekly. XCIX (7): 735–458. 12 February 1921.
- Sternick, Cary. A Bibliography of 19th Century Children's Series Books: With Price Guide. United States: C. Sternick, 2003. Print.
- Tylutki, George E. (1986). "A. L. Burt Company". In Dzwonkoski, Peter (ed.). American Literary Publishing Houses, 1638–1899, Part 1: A–M. Dictionary of Literary Biography. Vol. 49. Detroit, Michigan: Gale Research Company. pp. 69–70. ISBN 0-8103-1727-3.
- "Publishing Histories: A.L. Burt (1883–1937)." Newport Vintage Books. N.p., n.d. Web. 24 Jan. 2016.
