= Murder in the Library =

1933 film by George Melford

- Directed by: George Melford
- Written by: Fred V. Blair
- Based on: Playthings of Desire by Harry Sinclair Drago
- Produced by: Aubrey M. Kennedy
- Starring: Linda Watkins; James Kirkwood Sr. Reed Howes
- Cinematography: Mack Stengler
- Edited by: Helene Turner
- Music by: George Henninger
- Production company: Sun Haven Studios
- Distributed by: Pinnacle Productions
- Release date: September 2, 1933
- Running time: 50 minutes
- Country: United States
- Language: English

Murder in the Library or Playthings of Desire (U.S. alternate title) is a 1933 American drama film directed by George Melford and starring Linda Watkins, James Kirkwood Sr., and Reed Howes. It was made by the Poverty Row company Pinnacle Productions. It is a remake of the 1924 silent film Playthings of Desire.

== Partial cast ==
- Linda Watkins as Gloria Dawn
- James Kirkwood Sr. as Jim Malvern
- Reed Howes as Jack Halliday
- Josephine Dunn as Anne Cabot Ford
- Molly O'Day as Renee Grant
- Jack Chapin as Wheeler Johnson

== DVD release ==
The 1933 film was released on Region 0 DVD-R by Alpha Video on July 7, 2015.

== Bibliography ==
- Liebman, Roy. The Wampas Baby Stars: A Biographical Dictionary, 1922-1934. McFarland, 2000.
