= Weedon Island, Florida =

Weedon Island
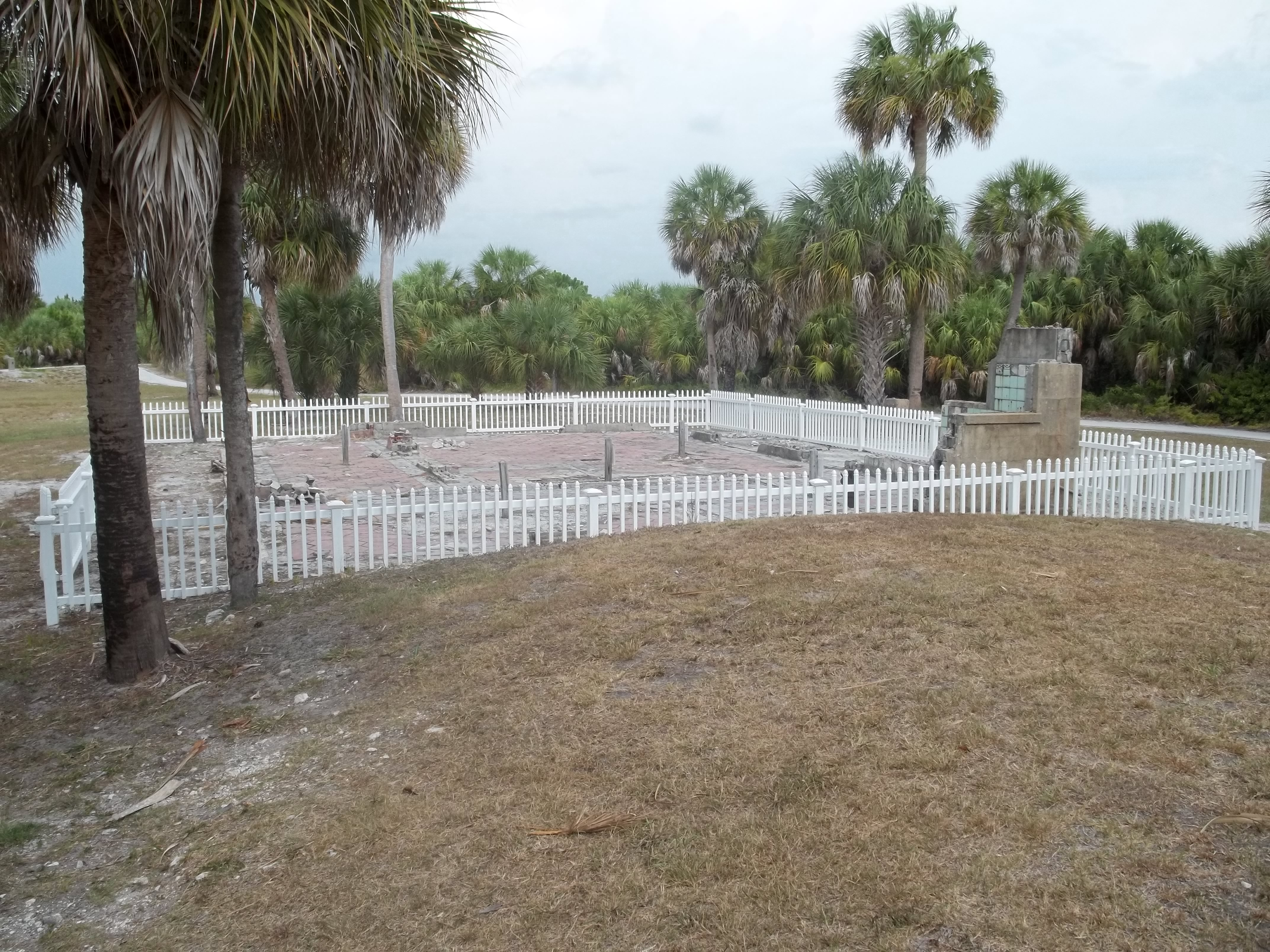
- Remains of the airport's waiting room

- Location within Florida
- Coordinates: 27°50′43.09″N 82°36′5.35″W
- Country: United States
- State: Florida
- County: Pinellas
- Established: 1898
- Area code: 727
- GNIS feature ID: 292981

Weedon Island is located in Pinellas County, Florida, United States. It is located within the Weedon Island Preserve, in the northern portion of the city of St. Petersburg, on the western coast of Old Tampa Bay. Weedon Island is archaeologically significant as it serves as a type-site for the Weeden Island Culture. Weedon Island is named for its early owner Dr. Leslie Weedon.

== History ==
=== Early years ===
Former Confederate soldier Captain W. B. Henderson purchased the land that was to become Weedon Island in 1886 with war bonds. When Captain Henderson's daughter Blanche married Dr. Leslie Weedon in 1898, Henderson gave the new couple the island as a wedding present. Weedon Island was only an island in high tide, and during low tide, it was connected to the peninsula. Leslie Weedon and his family spent the weekends here from nearby Tampa. At that time, there were no bridges across Tampa Bay, so they traveled to the island with their belongings by boat and brought everything back home for the weekdays. Another family, the Benjamins, lived on the nearby Benjamin Island. Henry R. Benjamin bought Benjamin Island for $1,000 (worth $23,000 in 2016) from Henderson on April 30, 1878. He kept the land for two years and then sold it to his son George M. Benjamin.

=== Archaeology ===
In 1923–24, the island was visited by a Florida archaeologist, Dr. Leslie Weedon, who preserved Indian mounds here and hoped that they would one day be a place of public heritage. During the winter of 1923–24 Professor J. Walter Fewkes, the chief of the Bureau of American Ethnology, directed excavations of the Weedon Island mounds. He concluded there were two waves of migration, the first one of unknown origin and the second thought to be from Georgia because the mounds there were very similar. The name for the Weeden Island Culture comes from the island itself.

=== Development ===
In 1934, Florida land boom developer Eugene M. Elliot wanted to establish a residential community on Weedon Island but ultimately failed.

The San Reno Club did manage to get built by one of his associates, Fred Blair, opening the Sky Harbor Airport (by the 1930s it was known as Grand Central Airport) in 1926. The airport was served by Pitcairn a predecessor of Eastern Air Lines taking passengers to places such as Miami, New York City and Washington, D.C. until the 1930s. On January 27, 1913 the Eastern Air Transport (Eastern Air Lines) moved its headquarters here, making it a very busy airport. On February 4, 1927 a man on a motorcycle had reported flames coming out of the island. The next morning an investigation was started and found one dead body and a blood-stained ax. This soon started many different trials and the victim that had died in the shed was identified as George W. Dash, a printer. The man accused of murdering the man and burning down the shed was William Cole. Cole was tried and convicted of murder and pleaded and was freed two years later. He also spent approximately six months in the Pinellas County Jail.

=== Film ===
The Weedon Island soon became a popular place for many Hollywood celebrities. In the 1930s the San Reno Club was made into a movie studio which soon burned down and a new one built nearby. In 1933 Sun Haven Studios made three movies Chloe, Playthings of Desire and Hired Wife here. Many performers included: Buster Keaton, Olive Borden, Greta Nissen, James Kirkwood with locals being extras.

=== National Park Proposal ===
In the mid 1930s a proposal was to make the island a national park by Pinellas County and St. Petersburg, and a committee was formed and sent to Washington, D.C. to meet with the head of the National Park Service at the time, Arno B. Cammerer. The committee had planned that the National Park Service would recognize it as de Soto's official landing site. In 1937, John R. Swanton, an ethnologist and chairman from Harvard University who went on to be part of the Smithsonian Institution's De Soto Commission, decided to research the locations of de Soto's landing site. The exact location was not determined but it was thought to have been at the Little Manatee River. The island did not get the monument and did not become a protected reserve. The landing site of de Soto is still debated today.

=== World War II ===
During World War II, the island's airport was converted into a military base due to a surge in aircraft demand.

=== Decline and later years ===
The demand for commercial flights during World War II declined, and the bridge into Weedon Island burned down in 1953. In 1965 and 1970, two teenagers were killed in a car accident on the bridge. The airport soon became vandalized and completely destroyed. In 1955, the Florida Power Corporation (Progress Energy) bought most of the northern end of the island to build a power plant. In 1960, a temporary salt water conversion plant was built here by Progress Energy, Cornell University and the federal government which operated for four years and made 35,000–50,000 gallons of fresh water a day. In 1970 the Greek Oil Tanker Dellan Apollon almost ran aground while trying to dock at the power plant on the island. By the early 1970s the last commercial land owners had sold the land, showing there was no future for commercial development and only the energy facility was left alone and the rest of the island was converted to a nature preserve. On March 25, 2000 on a clear day a helicopter was returning form St. Joseph's Hospital in Tampa and hit a radio tower guy wire and crashed into the mangroves on the island with all three people on board.

Today, the island is a preserve.

== Gallery ==
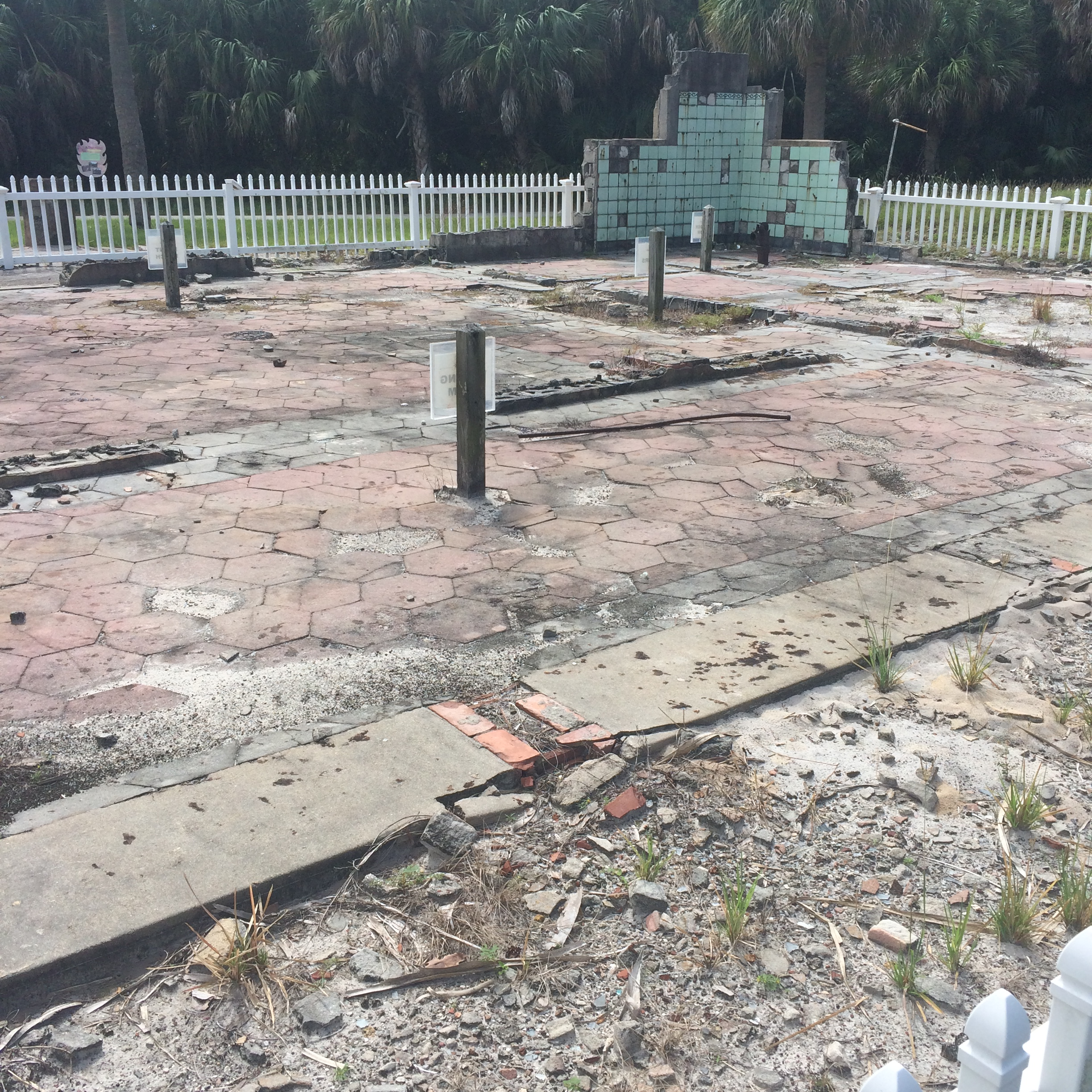
Airport Waiting Room Ruins (from the tarmac)

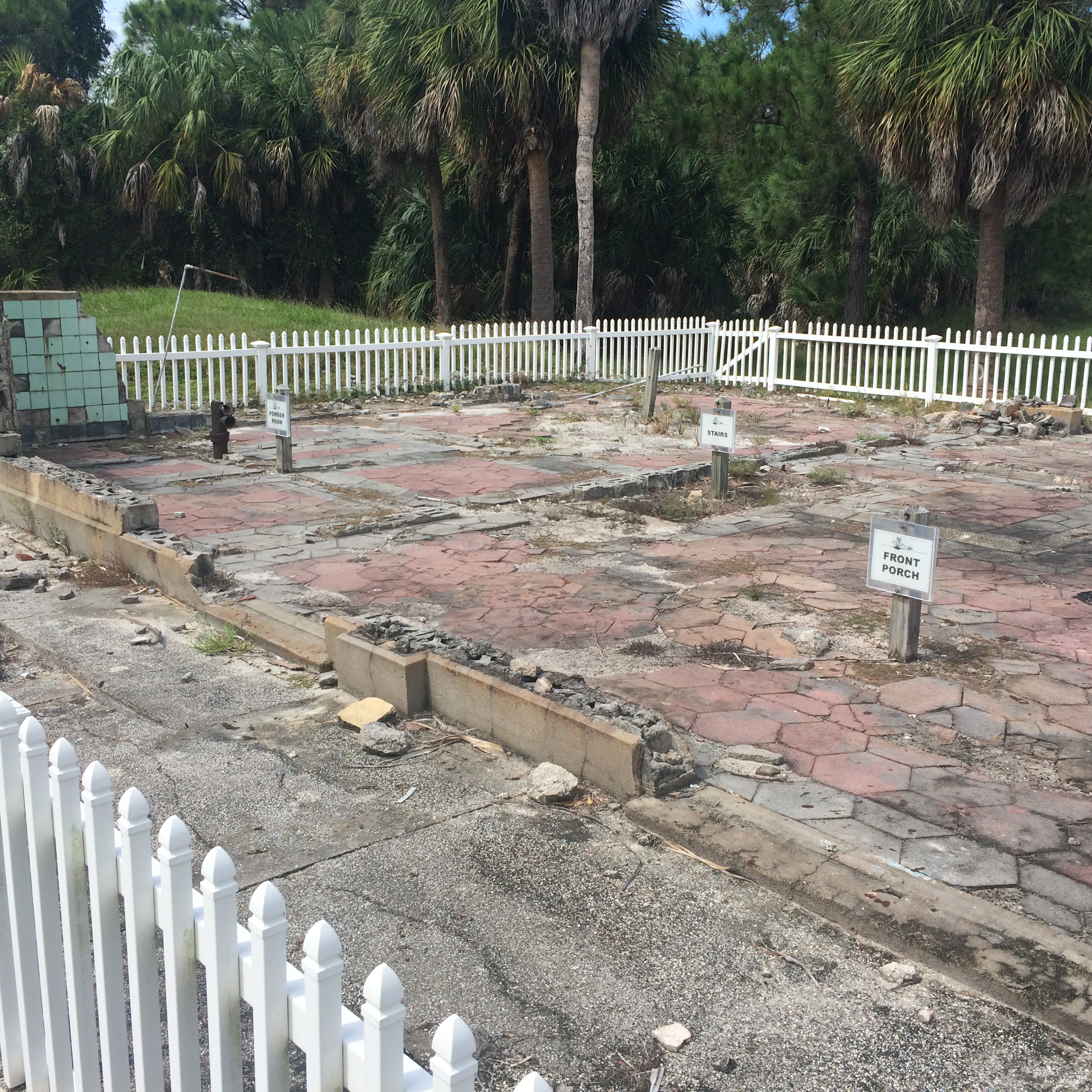
Airport Waiting Room Ruins (From the trail)

== See also ==
- Weeden Island culture
- List of ghost towns in Florida
