= Morgan Farley =

American actor (1898–1988)

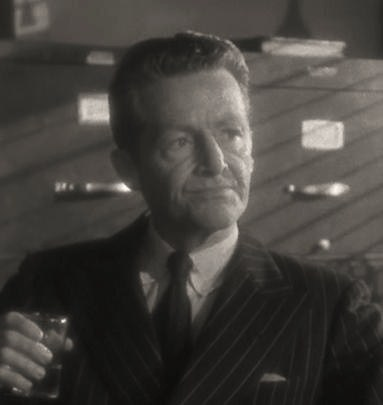
- Farley in Hollow Triumph (1948)
- Born: Francis Morgan Farley; October 3, 1898; Mamaroneck, New York, U.S.
- Died: October 11, 1988 (aged 90); San Pedro, California, U.S.
- Resting place: Valhalla Memorial Park Cemetery
- Occupation: Actor
- Years active: 1918–1981

Francis Morgan Farley (October 3, 1898 – October 11, 1988) was an American actor on the stage and in films and television.

== Career ==
His theatrical career began in 1917 in the stage adaptation of Booth Tarkington's Seventeen. He starred in the long-running Broadway comedy Fata Morgana by Ernest Vajda in 1924. He recreated the role of Joe Bullitt in Orson Welles's Mercury Theatre on the Air adaptation of the story that aired October 16, 1938. He gained a whole new generation of followers as a result of his guest spots on the original Star Trek series in the 1960s in the episodes "The Return of the Archons" and "The Omega Glory". In 1967 he appeared as Paco on the TV western series The Big Valley in the episode titled "Days of Grace". He played the counterfeiter Harry Holmes in The Wild Wild West S3 E9 "The Night of the Circus of Death" which aired 11/2/1967. Morgan Farley also appeared in the Barnaby Jones episode titled, "See Some Evil...Do Some Evil" (4/8/1973).

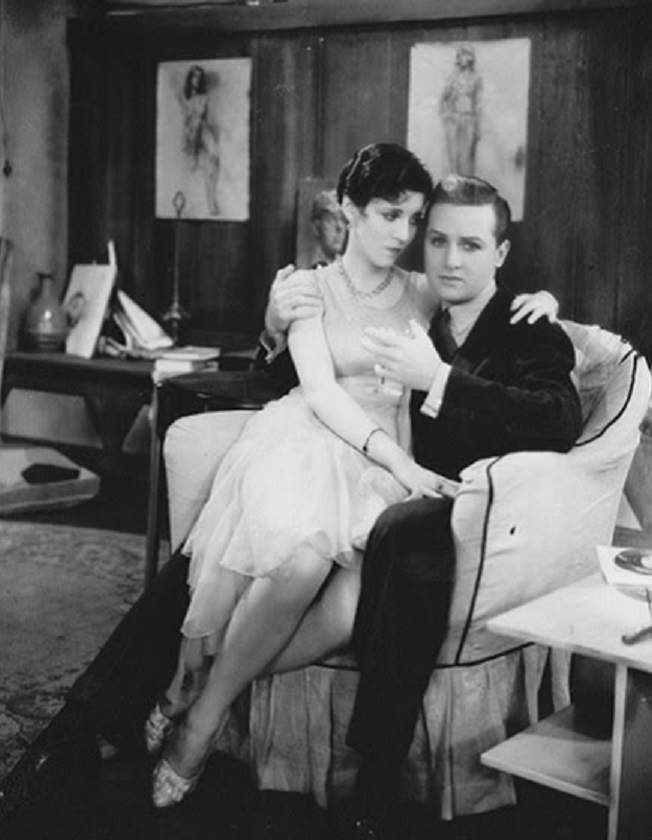
Still from Half Marriage (1929) with Olive Borden and Morgan Farley

Farley played a large number of mostly small parts in movies, television and Broadway, including the church minister in High Noon; and a juror permitted to ask questions in Angel Face. He also served in World War II.

He was an openly homosexual actor and was an activist in the early movement to gain civil and equal rights for homosexual Americans. He was a member of the board of ONE, Inc., the first public LGBT organization and publication (ONE Magazine). His contribution is covered in a book by Joseph Hansen on ONE Magazine's main editor, Don Slater, titled A Few Doors West of Hope, published by the Homosexual Information Center. (Information on HIC can be found on the website, tangentgroup.org)

He died on October 11, 1988, eight days after his 90th birthday. His ashes were scattered in the rose garden at Valhalla Memorial Park Cemetery, North Hollywood, California.

== Selected filmography ==
- The Love Doctor (1929) - Bud Woodbridge
- The Greene Murder Case (1929) - Rex Greene
- Half Marriage (1929) - Dickie Carroll
- The Mighty (1929) - Jerry Patterson
- Slightly Scarlet (1930) - Malatroff's Victim
- Only the Brave (1930) - Lt. Tom Wendell
- Men Are Like That (1930) - Joe Fisher
- The Devil's Holiday (1930) - Monkey McConnell
- A Man from Wyoming (1930) - Lt. Lee
- Beloved (1934) - Eric Hausmann
- Gentleman's Agreement (1947) - Resort Clerk
- You Were Meant for Me (1948) - Ticket Taker
- Open Secret (1948) - Larry Mitchell
- The Winner's Circle (1948) - Gus
- The Walls of Jericho (1948) - Proprietor
- Hollow Triumph (1948) - Howard Anderson
- MacBeth (1948) - Doctor
- Behind Locked Doors (1948) - Mr. Topper - a Patient
- Bride of Vengeance (1949) - Treasurer
- Flamingo Road (1949) - Link Niles
- Manhandled (1949) - Doc, Police Lab Man
- Special Agent (1949) - Dr. Jerome Bowen
- Abbott and Costello Meet the Killer, Boris Karloff (1949) - Gregory Milford
- Top o' the Morning (1949) - Edwin Livesley
- That Forsyte Woman (1949) - Bookseller
- Guilty of Treason (1950) - Doctor
- Barricade (1950) - The Judge
- The Man Who Cheated Himself (1950) - Rushton
- Double Crossbones (1951) - Caleb Nicholas
- Sealed Cargo (1951) - Caleb
- Goodbye, My Fancy (1951) - Doctor Pitt
- Tomorrow Is Another Day (1951) - Doctor
- The Lady from Texas (1951) - Lucian Haddon
- The Strange Door (1951) - Renville
- The Wild North (1952) - Father Simon
- Love Is Better Than Ever (1952) - Joe, Piano Player
- High Noon (1952) - Dr. Mahin - Minister
- My Wife's Best Friend (1952) - Dr. McCurran
- Angel Face (1953) - Juror
- Julius Caesar (1953) - Artemidorus
- Remains to Be Seen (1953) - Kyle Manning
- Jivaro (1954) - Vinny
- Hello, Dolly! (1969) - Workman / Onlooker
- The Barefoot Executive (1971) - Advertising Executive
- Bedknobs and Broomsticks (1971) - Old Piano Player
- Scorpio (1973)
- Soylent Green (1973) - Book #1
- At Long Last Love (1975) - Third Man
- Won Ton Ton, the Dog Who Saved Hollywood (1976) - Old Man in Back of Bus With Hat
- The Last Tycoon (1976) - Marcus
- Nickelodeon (1976) - Movie Fanatic
- Heaven Can Wait (1978) - Middleton
- Sgt. Pepper's Lonely Hearts Club Band (1978) - Old Lonely Hearts Club Band
- Dreamer (1979) - Old Timer
