= Helene Turner =

American film editor

- Born: 1899 or 1900
- Died: November 10, 1969; aged 69
- Occupation: Film editor
- Years active: 1929–1941; 1954–1962
- Spouse(s): J. Raymond Friedgen (? – 1966, his death); Dick Currier (m. 1969)

Helene Turner (1899 or 1900 – November 10, 1969), sometimes credited as Helen Turner, was an American film editor who worked in the industry for over 30 years, beginning during the silent era.

== Career ==
For part of her career, she worked as a cutter at Florida's Sun Haven Studios. There was also a period where she was employed by Paramount. She received a writing credit on the 1958 film noir Hong Kong Affair. She was noted for cutting a number of serials for Republic, which may help explain how she came to be onstage in the July 1937 debut production of the recently formed Republic Studio Club, a farce entitled Buckshot and Butterflies, penned by cast member King Kennedy and directed by Ralph Byrd. She would appear in at least one additional RSC production, another actor-penned original, in April 1940.

== Personal life and death ==
Until his death in 1966, Turner was married to her onetime writing partner, producer John Raymond Friedgen. In July 1969, she married her fellow former editor, Dick Currier.

Although little is known of Turner's life, either pre- or post-Hollywood, one very brief item–"Turner Given Leave," published by the Hollywood Reporter in 1939, may shed light on both.

Survived by her husband, Turner died, following a short illness, on November 20, 1969, aged 69, in Laguna, California.

== Selected filmography ==
- The Lady Lies (1929)
- Roadhouse Nights (1929)
- Dangerous Nan McGrew (1930)
- Laughter (1930)
- Honor Among Lovers (1931)
- Secrets of a Secretary (1931)
- Playthings of Desire (1933)
- Hired Wife (1934)
- Chloe, Love Is Calling You (1934)
- Fish from Hell (1935)
- Just My Luck (1936)
- Undersea Kingdom (1936)
- Zorro Rides Again (1937)
- Dick Tracy (1937)
- The Painted Stallion (1937)
- Child Bride (1938)
- The Lone Ranger Rides Again (1939)
- The Carson City Kid (1940)
- Hi-Yo Silver (1940)
- Secret Evidence (1941)
- Attila (1954)
- Huk! (1956)
- The Delinquents (1957)
- Hong Kong Affair (1958)
- The Cool and the Crazy (1958)
- The Cosmic Man (1959)
