= As a Man Lives =

1923 film

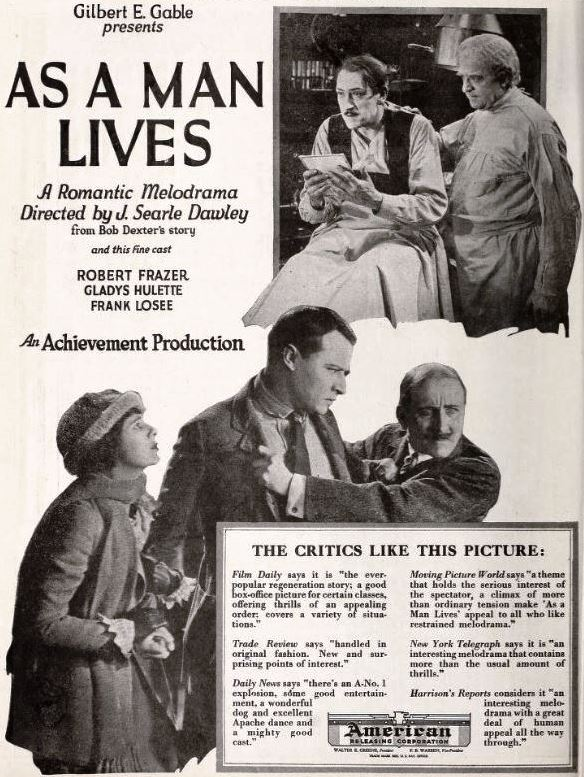
- Directed by: J. Searle Dawley
- Written by: Bob Dexter; William Dudley Pelley
- Produced by: Gilbert E. Gable
- Starring: Robert Frazer; Gladys Hulette; Frank Losee
- Cinematography: Bert Dawley
- Production company: Achievement Films
- Distributed by: American Releasing Corporation
- Release date: January 21, 1923
- Running time: 60 minutes
- Country: United States
- Languages: Silent; English intertitles

As a Man Lives is a 1923 American silent drama film directed by J. Searle Dawley and starring Robert Frazer, Gladys Hulette and Frank Losee.

== Cast ==
- Robert Frazer as Sherry Mason
- Gladys Hulette as Nadia Meredith
- Frank Losee as Dr. Ralph Neyas
- Jack Baston as La Chante
- Alfred E. Wright as Henri Camion
- Kate Blancke as Mrs. John Mason
- Tiny Belmont as Babette
- Charles Sutton as Atwill Meredith

== Bibliography ==
- Connelly, Robert B. The Silents: Silent Feature Films, 1910-36, Volume 40, Issue 2. December Press, 1998.
- Munden, Kenneth White. The American Film Institute Catalog of Motion Pictures Produced in the United States, Part 1. University of California Press, 1997.
