= Hard-Boiled Haggerty (film) =

1927 film

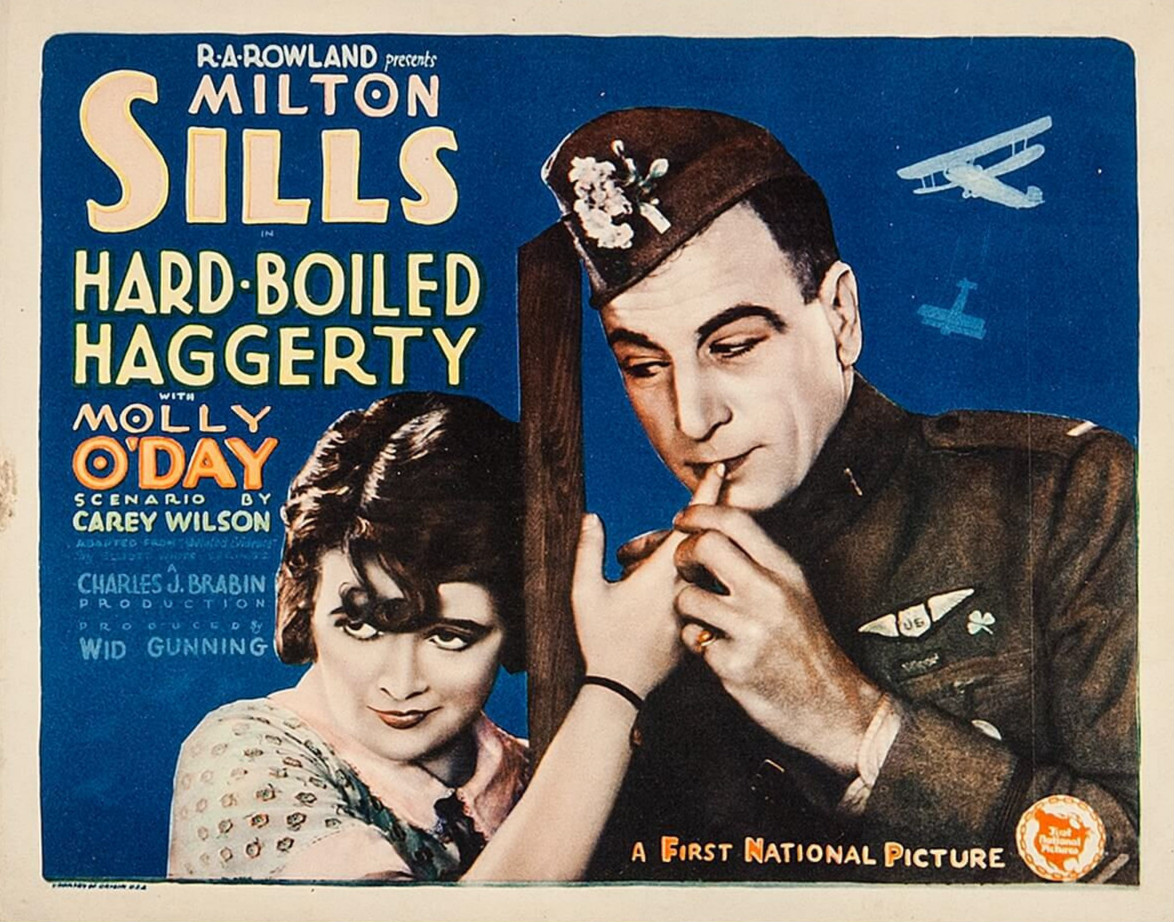
- Lobby card
- Directed by: Charles Brabin
- Written by: Carey Wilson
- Based on: "Belated Evidence"(story) by Elliot White Springs
- Produced by: Wid Gunning
- Starring: Milton Sills; Molly O'Day
- Cinematography: Sol Polito
- Production company: First National Pictures
- Distributed by: First National Pictures
- Release date: August 21, 1927; (United States)
- Country: United States
- Language: Silent (English intertitles)

Hard-Boiled Haggerty (aka Hard Boiled Haggerty) is a 1927 American silent war film directed by Charles Brabin. The film stars Milton Sills and Molly O'Day, taking on two roles as both the character Germaine and her look-alike sister. Hard-Boiled Haggerty was one of the first American films to portray aerial combat in World War I.

== Plot ==
After bringing down yet another German pilot and escaping uninjured from his burning aircraft, Haggerty and his buddy, aircraft machinist Klaxon, head for Paris, albeit without an official leave of absence. In escaping from M.P.'s, Haggerty takes refuge in a room occupied by Germaine Benoit. Love soon springs up, and Haggerty decides to reform, returning to Major Cotton with this resolution. He is unprepared, however, to be awarded a medal for his actions as a fighter pilot.

Major Cotton, when introduced to Germaine at the officers' ball, recognizes her as "Go-Go", a notorious cabaret dancer, and tries to tell Haggerty who she really is. Haggerty angrily knocks him down, and they are both arrested. At the trial, the major tells his story and Germaine confesses. After the Armistice, it develops that Go-Go is actually Germaine's sister, and that Germaine was trying to protect her. The two lovers Germaine and Haggerty are finally reunited.

== Cast ==
- Milton Sills as Hard-Boiled Haggerty
- Molly O'Day as Germaine Benoit / "Go-Go" Benoit
- Mitchell Lewis as Major Cotton
- Arthur Stone as Klaxon, the mechanic
- George Fawcett as Brigadier-General
- Yola d'Avril as Cafe dancer

== Production ==
Hard-Boiled Haggerty was based on a story by former World War I pilot Elliot White Springs, but was more of a romantic comedy than an aviation film. Nevertheless, a number of aircraft were used in the production: Travel Air 4000, Travel Air 4000, Fokker D.VII and Thomas Morse S-4C.

== Reception ==
Aviation film historian James Farmer considered Hard-Boiled Haggerty, although one of the first films to depict the aerial conflicts of World War I, as light weight fare. Aviation film historian Stephen Pendo noted that more action took place on the ground than in the air.
