= Jack Baston =

Film & stage actor (1892–1970)

Jack Baston (1892–1970) was an American actor who appeared on stage and in films. He is known by various iterations of his name. He specialized in roles as a villain.

In 1917 his one-act play The Color Scheme was copyrighted.

Emerson College has a document related to him.

Baston was born and raised in San Francisco, California.

== Filmography ==
- Empty Pockets (1918) as Shang Ganley (credited as J. Thornton Baston)
- The White Moll (1920) as The Dangler (credited as J. Thornton Baston)
- The Tiger's Cub (1920)
- The Fighting Kentuckians (1920)
- Dynamite Allen (1921) as Howard Morton (credited as J. Thornton Baston)
- Beyond Price (1921) as Mrs. Temple's Friend
- A Virgin Paradise (1921) as Slim (credited as J. Thornton Baston)
- The Mountain Woman (1921) as Jase Mallows
- Down to the Sea in Ships (1922) as Samuel Siggs (credited as J. Thornton Baston)
- As a Man Lives (1923) as La Chante
- The Snow Bride (1923) as Paul Gerard
- Chain Lightning (1927) as Campan
- The Circus Ace (1927) as Kirk Mallory
- By Whose? Hand? (1927) as Sidney (credited as J. Thornton Baaston)
- The Loves of Carmen (1927) as Morales
- Hello Cheyenne (1928) as Buck Lassiter
- The Branded Sombrero (1928) as Charles Maggert
