= Beyond Price =

1921 film

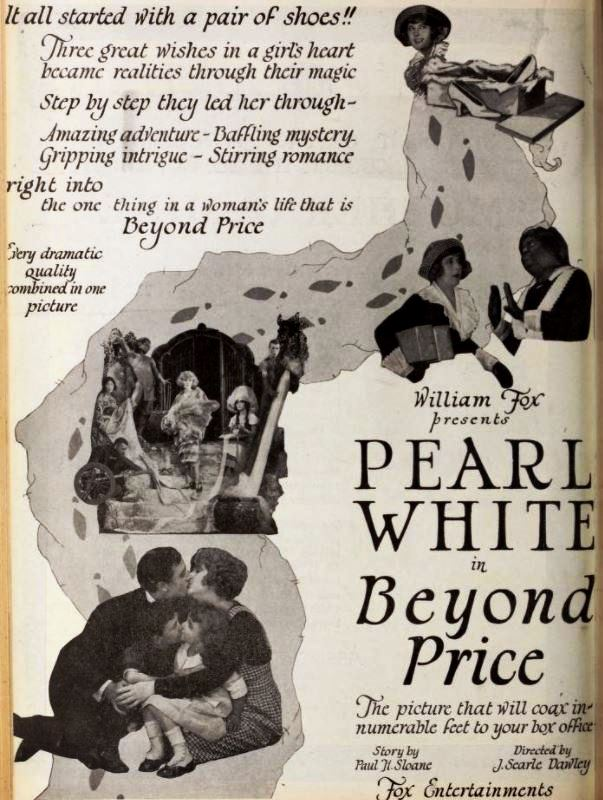
- Directed by: J. Searle Dawley
- Written by: Paul Sloane
- Produced by: William Fox
- Starring: Pearl White; Vernon Steele; Ottola Nesmith
- Cinematography: Joseph Ruttenberg
- Production company: Fox Film
- Distributed by: Fox Film
- Release date: May 8, 1921
- Running time: 50 minutes
- Country: United States
- Languages: Silent; English intertitles

Beyond Price is a 1921 American silent drama film directed by J. Searle Dawley and starring Pearl White, Vernon Steele and Ottola Nesmith.

== Cast ==
- Pearl White as Sally Marrio
- Vernon Steele as Philip Marrio
- Nora Reed as Valicia
- Arthur Gordini as Lester Lawton
- Louis Haines as J. Peter Weatherby
- Maude Turner Gordon as Mrs. Florence Weathersby
- Byron Douglas as Norbert Temple
- Ottola Nesmith as Mrs. Temple
- Dorothy Walters as Mrs. Dusenberry
- Dorothy Allen as Lizzie
- Jack Baston as Mrs. Temple's Friend
- Charles Sutton as Cobbler

== Bibliography ==
- Munden, Kenneth White. The American Film Institute Catalog of Motion Pictures Produced in the United States, Part 1. University of California Press, 1997.
