= Sisters (1930 film) =

1930 film

- Directed by: James Flood
- Written by: Ralph Graves; Jo Swerling
- Produced by: Harry Cohn
- Starring: Sally O'Neil; Molly O'Day; Russell Gleason
- Cinematography: Ted Tetzlaff
- Edited by: Gene Havlick
- Production company: Columbia Pictures
- Distributed by: Columbia Pictures
- Release date: June 15, 1930
- Running time: 66 minutes
- Country: United States
- Language: English

Sisters is a 1930 American pre-Code crime film directed by James Flood and starring Sally O'Neil, Molly O'Day and Russell Gleason.

== Cast ==
- Sally O'Neil as Sally Malone
- Molly O'Day as Molly Shannon
- Russell Gleason as Eddie Collins
- Jason Robards Sr. as John Shannon
- Morgan Wallace as William Tully
- John Fee as Johnson
- Carl Stockdale as Jones

== Bibliography ==
- Martin, Len D. Columbia Checklist: The Feature Films, Serials, Cartoons, and Short Subjects of Columbia Pictures Corporation, 1922-1988. McFarland, 1991.
