= The Winner's Circle (1948 film) =

1948 film by Felix E. Feist

- Theatrical release poster
- Directed by: Felix E. Feist
- Screenplay by: Howard J. Green; Leonard Praskins
- Produced by: Richard K. Polimer
- Starring: Jean Willes; Morgan Farley; Johnny Longden; Robert S. Howard; William Gould; John Beradino
- Cinematography: Elmer Dyer
- Edited by: Richard G. Wray
- Music by: Lucien Cailliet
- Production company: 20th Century Fox
- Distributed by: 20th Century Fox
- Release date: June 8, 1948
- Running time: 74 minutes
- Country: United States
- Language: English

The Winner's Circle is a 1948 American drama film directed by Felix E. Feist and written by Howard J. Green and Leonard Praskins. The film stars Jean Willes, Morgan Farley, Johnny Longden, Robert S. Howard, William Gould and John Beradino. It was released on June 8, 1948, by 20th Century Fox.

== Plot ==
A new foal on Colonel Waldron's horse farm has him feeling nostalgic for great thoroughbreds of old. Another racehorse owner, Robert Howard, would like to buy the young colt, but young Jean Trent, daughter of stable owner Tom Trent, persuades the colonel to sell the horse to her.

Jean names the colt Teacher's Pet and is not discouraged when its practice times are very slow. But when the horse throws jockey Johnny Longden in a race at Santa Anita, her father insists that Teacher's Pet be sold. Howard buys the colt from the heartbroken girl.

After the horse's times fail to improve, Jean sells everything she owns and begs Howard to sell Teacher's Pet back to her. Her trainer Gus believes that the horse will fare better racing at longer distances, and when Longden is convinced to ride him one more time, Teacher's Pet races to victory.

== Cast ==
- Jean Willes as Jean Trent
- Morgan Farley as Gus
- Johnny Longden as Johnny Longden
- Robert S. Howard as Bob Howard
- William Gould as Tom Trent
- John Beradino as Trainer
- Frank Dae as Col. Waldron
- Joe Hernandez as Racetrack Announcer
- Elliott Lewis as Narrator

== See also ==
- List of films about horse racing
