= Mack Stengler =

American cinematographer

- Born: July 31, 1895; Wisconsin, U.S.
- Died: May 27, 1962 (aged 66); Hollywood, California, U.S.
- Occupation: Cinematographer

Macklyn Stengler (July 31, 1895 – May 27, 1962) was an American cinematographer whose Hollywood cinema and television career spanned 40 years. He shot the only three movies Sun Haven Studios ever released.

== Partial filmography ==
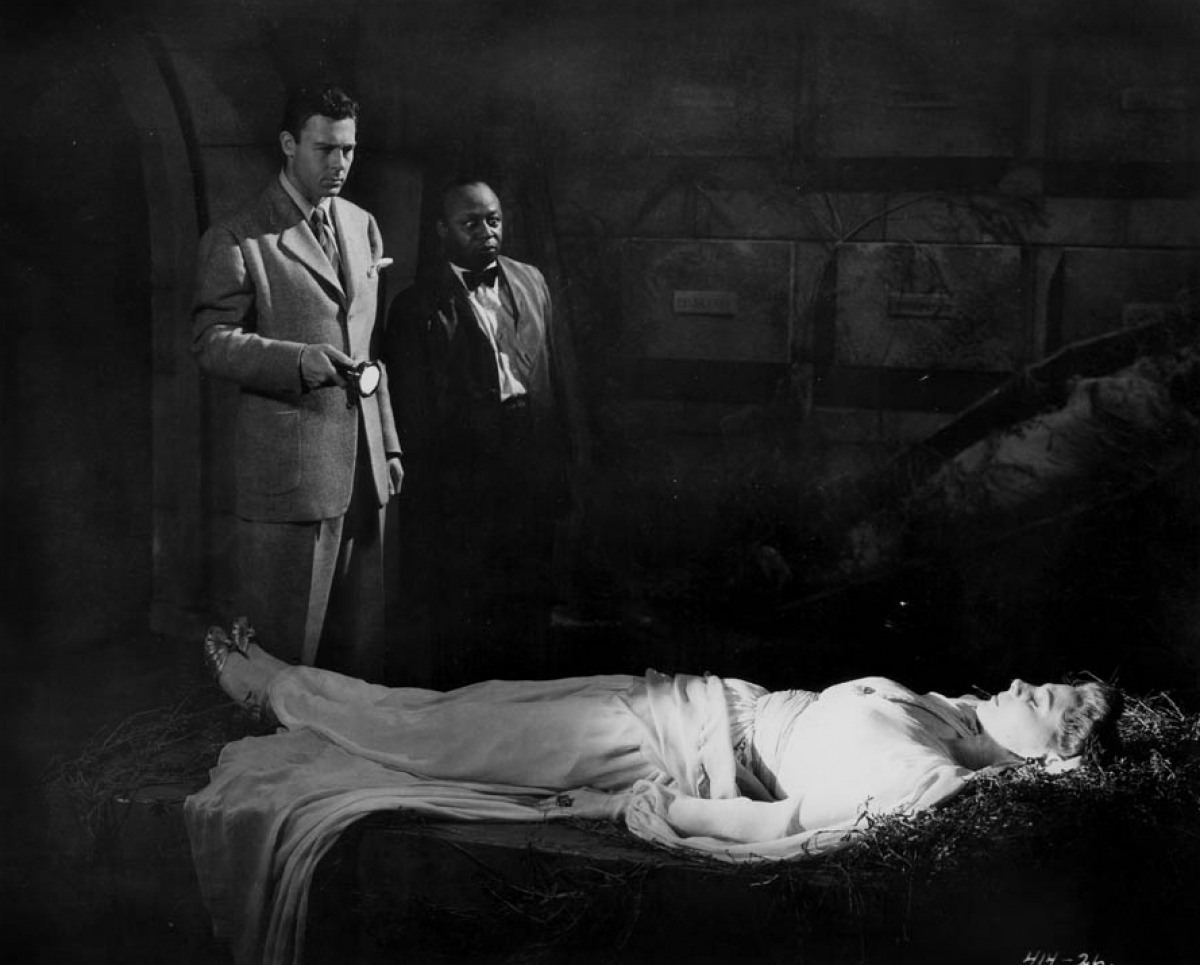
Dick Purcell, Mantan Moreland, and Patricia Stacey in King of the Zombies (1941)

- That Model from Paris (1926)
- College Days (1926)
- The Millionaire Policeman (1926)
- Sin Cargo (1926)
- Out of the Storm (1926)
- One Hour of Love (1927)
- The First Night (1927)
- Silver Comes Through (1927)
- Hired Wife (1934)
- Chloe, Love Is Calling You (1934)
- We're in the Legion Now! (1936)
- The Devil on Horseback (1936)
- King of the Zombies (1941)
- Caught in the Act (1941)
- Gambling Daughters (1941)
- Let's Go Collegiate (1941)
- Reg'lar Fellers (1941)
- Duke of the Navy (1942)
- Campus Rhythm (1943)
- Ghosts on the Loose (1943)
- The Crime Smasher (1943)
- Adventures of Kitty O'Day (1945)
- Fall Guy (1947)
- Jens Mansson in America (1947)
- I Wouldn't Be in Your Shoes (1948)
- Here Comes Tobor (1956)
