= Devil on Deck =

1932 film

- Directed by: Wallace Fox
- Written by: Bernard McConville
- Produced by: George W. Weeks
- Starring: Molly O'Day; Reed Howes
- Cinematography: William Nobles
- Edited by: Fred Bain
- Distributed by: Sono Art-World Wide Pictures
- Release date: January 1, 1932
- Running time: 70 minutes
- Country: United States
- Language: English

Devil on Deck is a 1932 Pre-code talking film directed by Wallace Fox and starring Reed Howes and Molly O'Day. It was produced and distributed by Sono Art-World Wide Pictures, a B-movie studio that turned out occasionally some successful pictures like The Great Gabbo.

== Story ==
As this is a lost film, not even the AFI has any story or plot on it. By the promotional material that survives, it's a typical South Seas story found all over the silent film era just a few years before sound arrived. The cast is made up mostly of silent film veterans.

== Cast ==
- Reed Howes as John Moore
- Molly O'Day as Kay Wheeler
- Wheeler Oakman as Shanghai Morgan
- June Marlowe as Mary Moore
- Kenneth Treseder as Limey
- A. S. 'Pop' Byron as Pop Wheeler
- Rolfe Sedan as Frenchie
- Constantine Romanoff as Swede

== Preservation status ==
- This film is presumed lost.
