= Half Marriage (film) =

1929 film directed by William J. Cowen

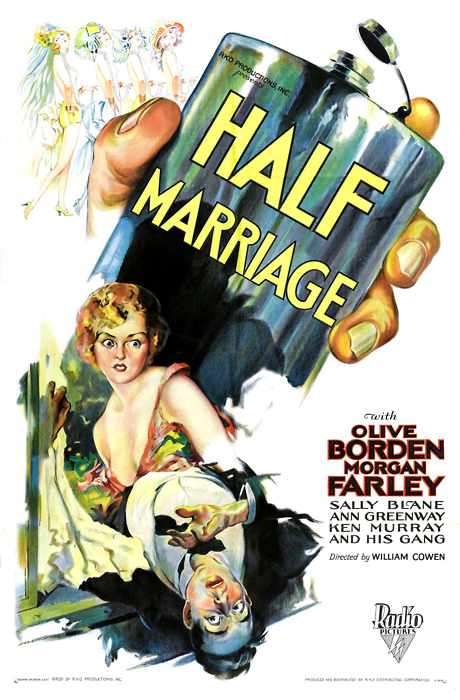
- Film poster for Half Marriage
- Directed by: William J. Cowen
- Screenplay by: Jane Murfin
- Based on: the short story, Half Marriage by George Kibbe Turner
- Produced by: William Le Baron
- Starring: Olive Borden; Morgan Farley
- Edited by: Archie Marshek
- Music by: Sidney Clare; Oscar Levant
- Production company: RKO Pictures
- Distributed by: RKO Pictures
- Release dates: August 10, 1929 (Premiere-New York City); October 13, 1929 (U.S.)
- Running time: 68 minutes
- Country: United States
- Language: English

Half Marriage is a 1929 American pre-Code melodramatic film directed by William J. Cowen from a script by Jane Murfin, based on the short story of the same name by George Kibbe Turner. The film starred Olive Borden and Morgan Farley, while the later-famed gossip columnist, Hedda Hopper played Borden's mother.

== Plot ==
Half Marriage (1929)

Judy Page is a young society girl who falls in love with an architect who works in her father's architectural firm, Dick Carroll. She lives in Greenwich Village in New York City, and one night after a party at her apartment, she runs off with Dick to get married. They are intercepted by Judy's mother at the apartment, who, not realizing they have already been married, insists that Judy return with her to their estate in the country. Dick remains behind in Judy's apartment.

In the country, Judy is being courted by Tom Stribbling, who has insinuated himself to be close to Judy, at the expense of all other suitors. Dick learns that Judy's parents are going to be away, and visits Judy at her parents' estate. He has words with Stribbling, after which he makes plans to meet with Judy in the coming days at her apartment. When Tom learns of the meeting, he sends a telegram to Dick, forging that it is from Judy, cancelling the rendezvous. At the appointed time of the meeting, Stribbling shows up, instead of Dick. When Judy makes it clear she wants nothing to do with him, Stribbling attempts to force himself on her. In the ensuing struggle, Stribbling trips, falling out of Judy's window to his death.

Just as Stribbling trips, Dick has arrived at the apartment, to witness his fall. Afraid that Judy will be blamed for Stribbling's death, Dick takes the blame, but the truth comes out during the brief police investigation, and Judy is cleared of any wrongdoing. Also, during the investigation, it is revealed that Judy and Dick are already married, much to the astonishment of her parents. After their initial shock, they give their blessing to the couple.

== Cast ==
- Olive Borden as Judy Page
- Morgan Farley as Dick Carroll
- Ken Murray as Charles Turner
- Ann Greenway as Ann Turner
- Anderson Lawler as Tom Stribbling
- Sally Blane as Sally
- Hedda Hopper as Mrs. Page
- Richard Tucker as George Page
- James Bradbury Jr. as Poverty
- Jack Trent as Rudy
- James Eagle as Matty
- G. Pat Collins as Mulhall

== Songs ==
- "After the Clouds Roll By" - Sidney Clare and Oscar Levant — performed by Ann Greenway
- "You're Marvelous" - Written by Sidney Clare and Oscar Levant Performed by Gus Arnheim and His Ambassadors, with Ken Murray

== Notes ==
The film was also released in the US in a silent version (at 5883 feet) by Radio-Keith-Orpheum Corporation [RKO] in 1929.

== See also ==
- List of early sound feature films (1926–1929)
