= Where East Is East =

1929 film

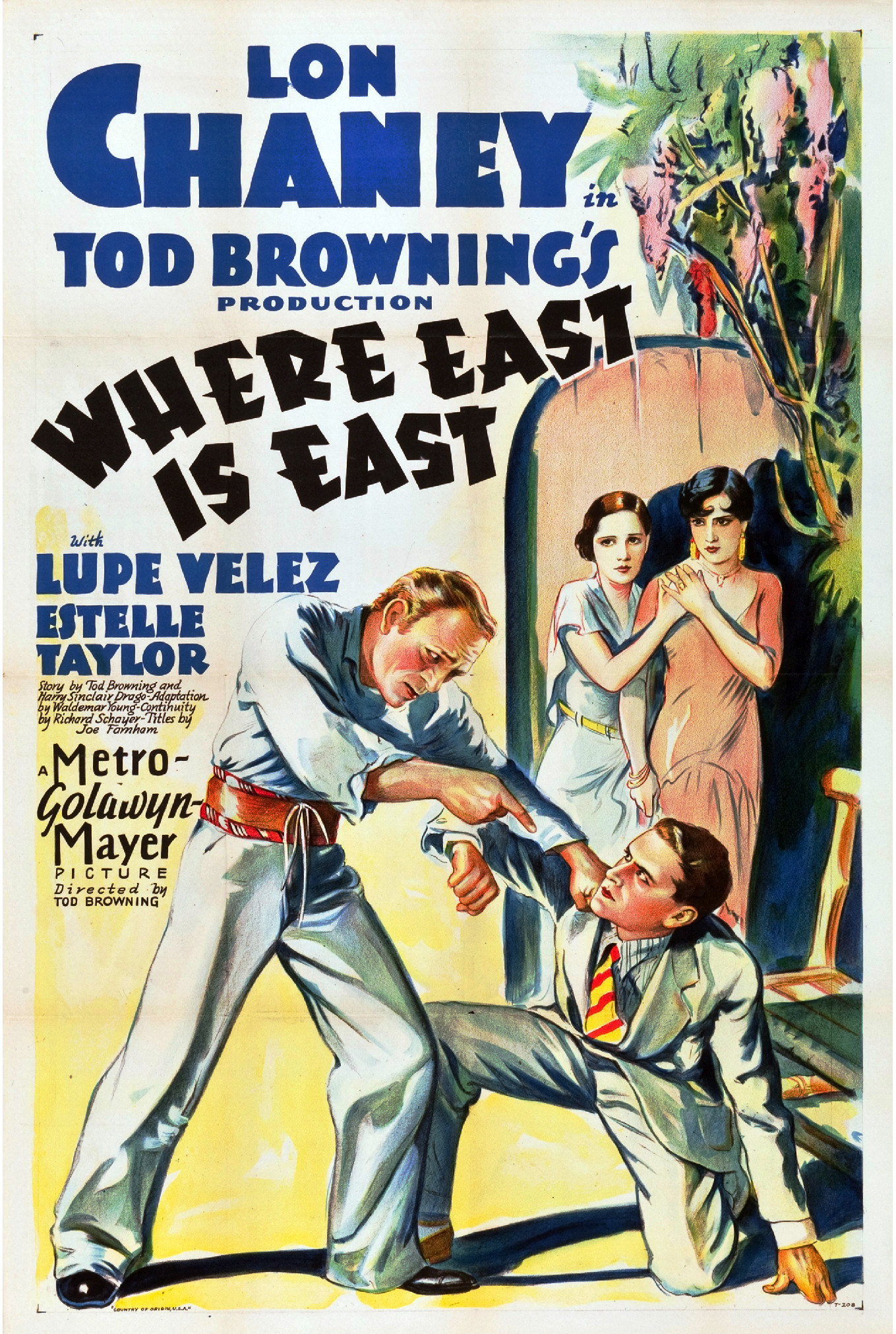
- Theatrical release poster
- Directed by: Tod Browning
- Written by: Waldemar Young (adaptation); E. Richard Schayer (scenario); Joseph Farnham (intertitles)
- Story by: Tod Browning; Harry Sinclair Drago
- Produced by: Hunt Stromberg; Irving Thalberg (uncredited)
- Starring: Lon Chaney; Lupe Vélez; Estelle Taylor; Lloyd Hughes
- Cinematography: Henry Sharp
- Edited by: Harry Reynolds; Irving Thalberg (uncredited)
- Music by: William Axt
- Distributed by: Metro-Goldwyn-Mayer
- Release date: May 4, 1929
- Running time: 65 minutes
- Country: United States
- Languages: Sound (Synchronized) (English Intertitles)

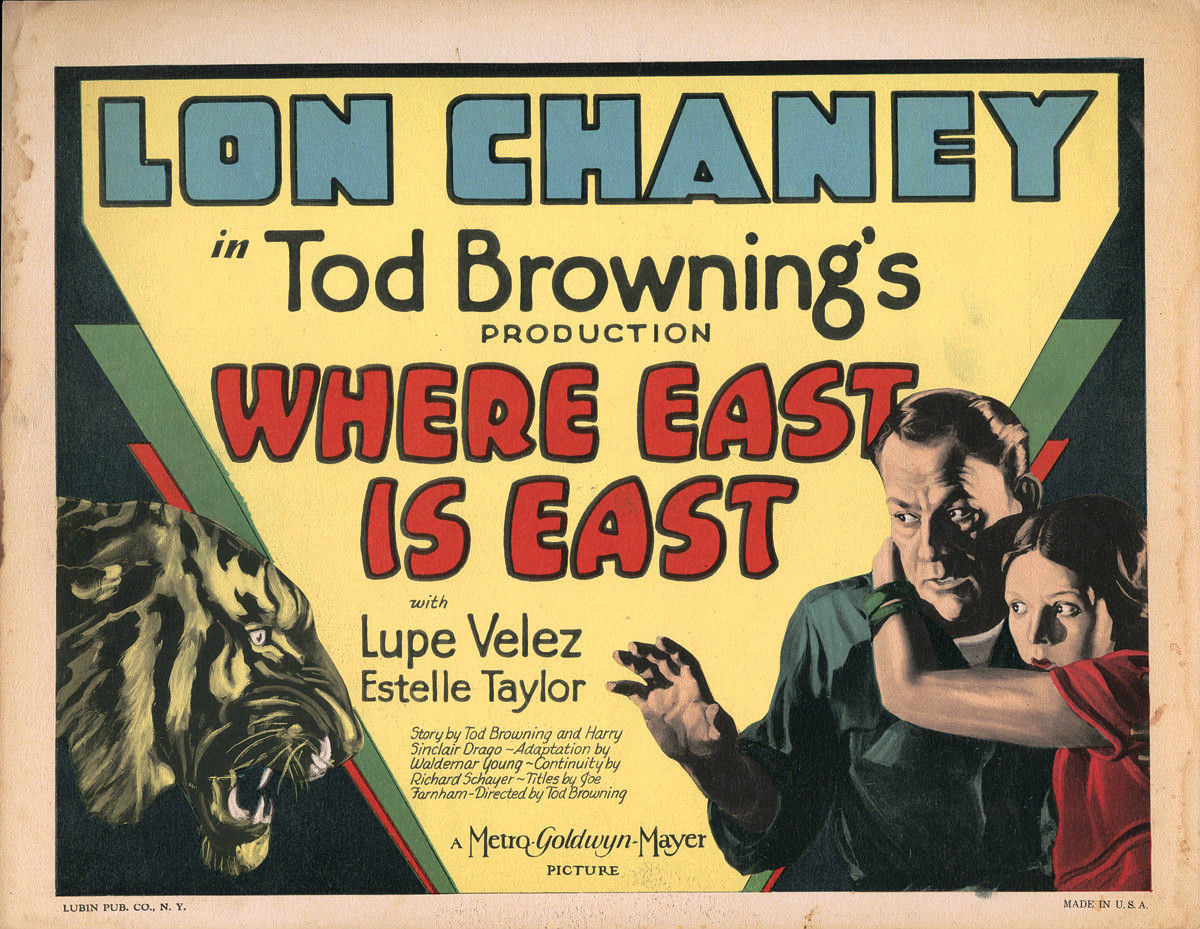
Lobby card

Where East Is East (1929)

Where East Is East is a 1929 American synchronized sound drama film starring Lon Chaney as an animal trapper in Laos. While the film has no audible dialog, it was released with a synchronized musical score with sound effects using both the sound-on-disc and sound-on-film process. The motion picture is Chaney's penultimate film without dialogue and the last of his collaborations with director Tod Browning. Metro-Goldwyn-Mayer used the Western Electric sound-on-film process to record the soundtrack for the film.

== Plot ==
Tiger Haynes traps wild animals for a living and bears the scars of his dangerous occupation on his face. He cares for only one thing in life: his beloved daughter Toyo. When he returns to the city of Vien-Tien from his latest foray in the jungle, Toyo tells him that she and Bobby Bailey, the son of an American circus owner (one of Tiger's best customers), have fallen in love and are engaged. Initially opposed to the union, Tiger gives them his blessing after Bobby protects the girl from a tiger that has gotten loose.

Tiger and Bobby take the captured animals down the river for shipment to Bobby's father. On the trip, Bobby becomes infatuated with the alluring Madame de Sylva. When Bobby introduces Tiger to her, they regard each other with intense hatred. Tiger takes Bobby off the ship to get him away from the woman. While waiting for the barge carrying the animals, he explains that Madame de Sylva is Toyo's mother. She ran away when Toyo was only a baby. Aghast, Bobby makes Tiger promise to keep the whole incident secret.

When they reach the port, Tiger is worried because Bobby and De Sylva will be sailing across the Pacific on the same ship. Bobby reassures him by instead returning with him to Toyo. However, Madame de Sylva arrives unexpectedly, and she is welcomed by an unsuspecting Toyo. De Sylva uses all her feminine wiles to try to lure Bobby away from her daughter. After Toyo overhears the truth in a heated argument between her parents, she tells Bobby she only wants him to be happy, which frees Bobby from the older woman's spell.

Tiger secretly opens the cage of an old gorilla who still remembers being mistreated by De Sylva long ago. It is implied that the femme fatale is killed. When Toyo and Bobby see what is going on, Tiger rushes into De Sylva's room, and he is gravely injured. Afterward, hiding the seriousness of his wounds, Tiger watches the young couple get married by the Padre.

== Cast ==
- Lon Chaney as Tiger Haynes
- Lupe Vélez as Toyo Haynes
- Estelle Taylor as Madame de Sylva
- Lloyd Hughes as Bobby Bailey
- Louis Stern as Padre, Father Angelo
- Mrs. Wong Wing as Ming, the woman who raised Toyo
- Willie Fung as Servant (uncredited)
- Duke Kahanamoku as Wild Animal Trapper (uncredited)
- Mademoiselle Kithnou as de Sylva's maid, who tries to help Tiger several times (uncredited)
- Richard Neill as Rangho the Gorilla (uncredited)

== See also ==
- List of early sound feature films (1926–1929)
