= The Tiger's Cub =

American 1920 film

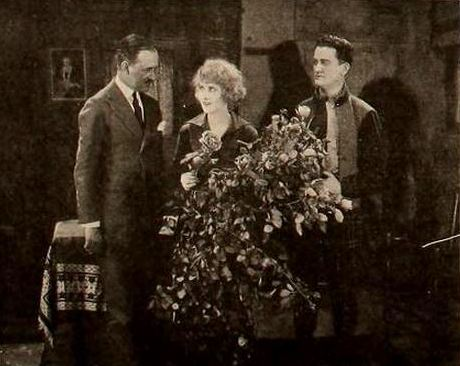
- Directed by: Charles Giblyn
- Written by: Paul H. Sloan
- Based on: Tiger's Cub by George Goodchild
- Produced by: William Fox
- Cinematography: Joseph Ruttenberg
- Production company: Fox Film
- Distributed by: Fox Film
- Release date: October 10, 1920
- Running time: 6 reels
- Country: USA
- Language: Silent (English intertitles)

The Tiger's Cub is a lost 1920 American silent drama film directed by Charles Giblyn. It was adapted from George Potter's 1915 play staged in London. The play was novelized by George Goodchild.

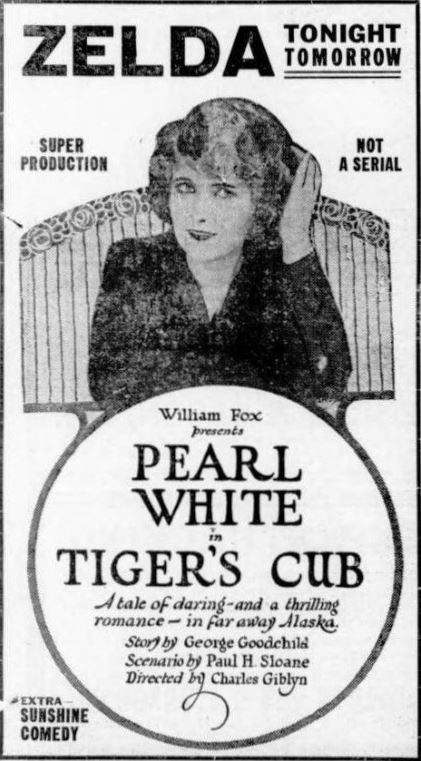

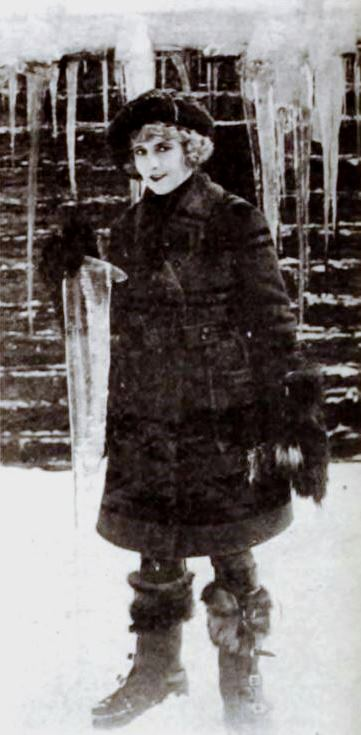

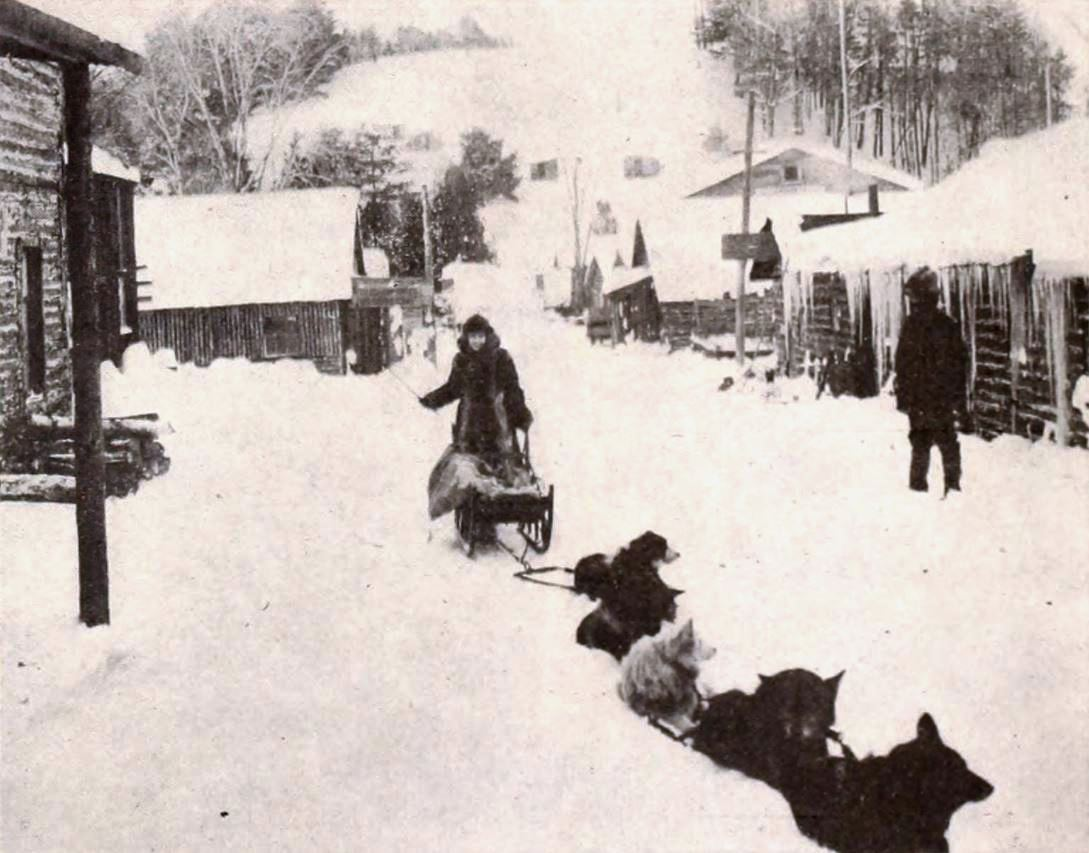

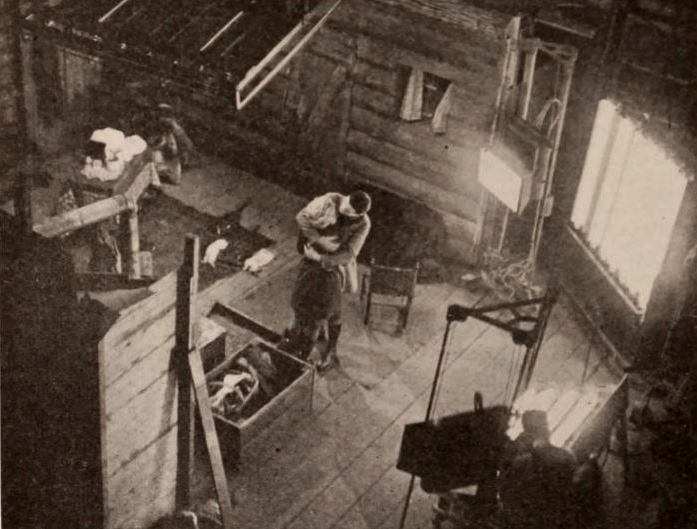

One review states, "It's a Klondike picture full of snow, ice, log cabins, macinaws, gamblers and much other scenery and character, but always snow in the foregrounds." Pearl White wore fashionable gowns in the film. Another review calls it a "faithful portrayal of Alaskan conditions."

The six-reel drama is set in Alaska and includes a love story.

== Cast ==
- Pearl White as Tiger's Cub
- Thomas Carrigan as David Summers
- Jack Baston as Bill Slark
- John Davidson as Lone Wolf
- Frank Evans as Tiger
- John Woodford as Colonel Summers
- Ruby Hoffman as Hilda
- Albert Tavarnier as Father Jerome

== Preservation ==
With no holdings located in archives, The Tiger's Cub is considered a lost film.
