= Fig Leaves =

1926 film

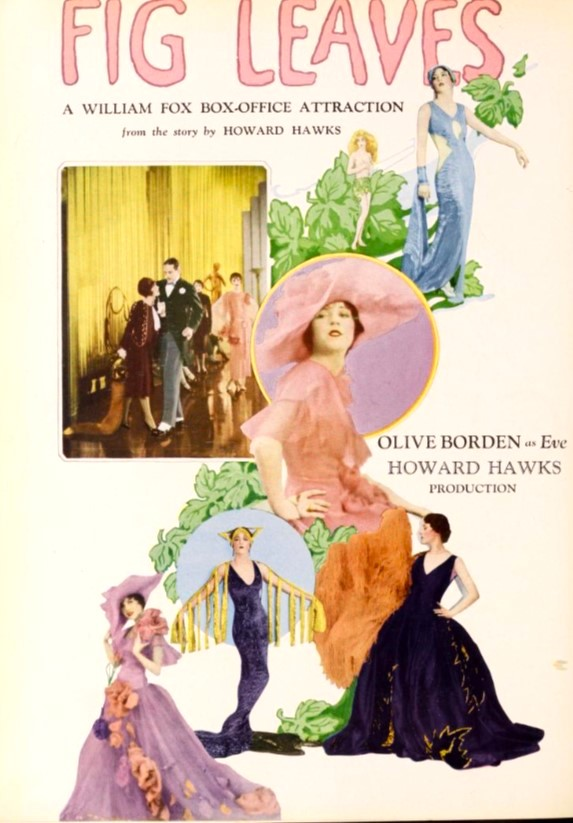
- Advertisement
- Directed by: Howard Hawks
- Written by: Story: Howard Hawks; Screenplay: Louis D. Lighton; Hope Loring
- Produced by: William Fox
- Starring: George O'Brien; Olive Borden
- Cinematography: Joseph H. August
- Edited by: Rose Smith
- Distributed by: Fox Film Corporation
- Release date: August 22, 1926
- Running time: 70 minutes
- Country: United States
- Language: Silent (English intertitles)

Fig Leaves is a 1926 American silent comedy film directed by Howard Hawks, released by Fox Film Corporation, and starring George O'Brien and Olive Borden. The film had a sequence, a fashion show, that was filmed in 2-strip Technicolor.

== Plot ==
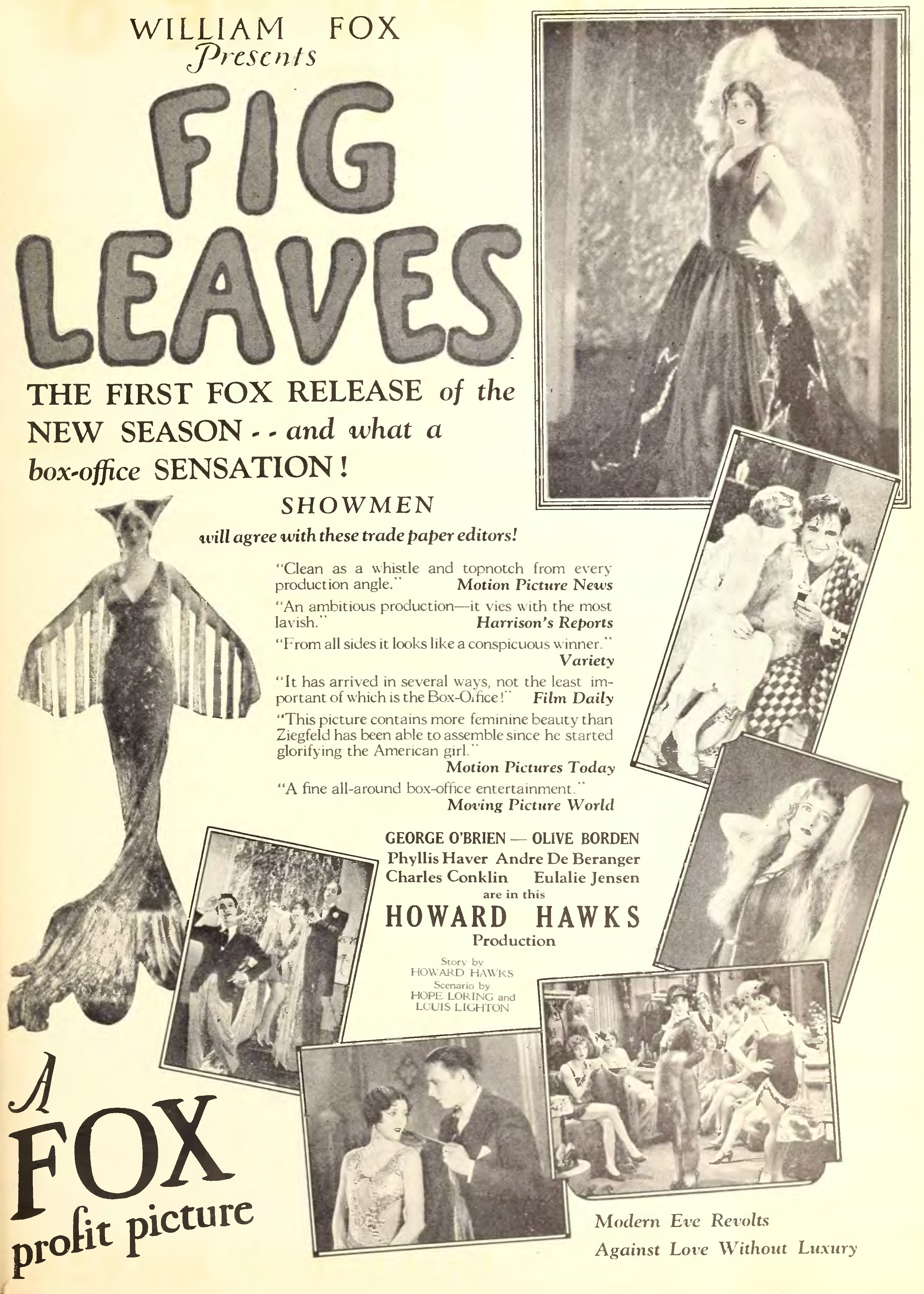
Fig Leaves ad in Motion Picture News, 1926

Fig Leaves (1926)

A married couple is juxtaposed in the Garden of Eden and in modern New York City. The Garden of Eden humorously depicts Adam (played by George O'Brien) and Eve (played by Olive Borden) awoken by a Flintstones-like coconut alarm clock and Adam reading the morning news on giant stone tablets. In the modern day, the biblical serpent is replaced by Eve's gossiping neighbor and Eve becomes a sexy flapper and fashion model when Adam is at work.

== Cast ==
- George O'Brien as Adam Smith
- Olive Borden as Eve Smith
- Phyllis Haver as Alice Atkins
- George Beranger as Josef André (as André de Beranger)
- William Austin as André's assistant
- Heinie Conklin as Eddie McSwiggen
- Eulalie Jensen as Madame Griswald

== Preservation ==
A print of Fig Leaves survives in the film archive of the Museum of Modern Art.

== See also ==
- List of early color feature films
- List of films featuring dinosaurs
