= Robert Bischoff =

American film editor

- Born: Robert William Bischoff; January 28, 1899; Denver, Colorado, United States
- Died: May 12, 1945 (aged 46); Bethesda, Maryland, United States
- Occupation: Film editor
- Years active: 1927-1943

Robert William Bischoff (January 28, 1899 – May 12, 1945) was an American film editor. In a career that lasted from the mid-1920s until his World War II service with U.S. Navy in 1943, he worked on over 30 films for Fox Film Corporation and then continued with 20th Century Fox. He died at the end of the war in Europe while still serving in the Navy.

Born in Denver, Bischoff signed a contract with Fox in 1927 and started by editing three silent Western vehicles for Tom Mix — The Last Trail, Hello Cheyenne and Painted Post.

He worked uncredited on a number of films and received billing on others, such as Rackety Rax, a 1932 vehicle for Victor McLaglen. In 1936 he moved to Paramount Pictures as the editor of The Trail of the Lonesome Pine, the studio's first film in Technicolor and the first feature to be shot on location in three-strip Technicolor.

Returning to Fox in 1939, now under the logo "20th Century Fox", he edited a number of big-budget productions — two vehicles for Shirley Temple — 1939's Susannah of the Mounties and 1940's The Blue Bird — as well as three Tyrone Power films — 1940's Brigham Young and The Mark of Zorro, along with 1941's Blood and Sand.

Bischoff's final studio film was the Jack Benny comedy, The Meanest Man in the World, released in February 1943, during the middle of World War II. Commissioned as a naval lieutenant at age 44, he was put in charge of the photographic science lab at Anacostia Naval Laboratories.

In May 1945, shortly after V-E Day, he became ill in his office and died at Bethesda Naval Medical Center at the age of 46. He was survived by his wife. His grave is in Hollywood Forever Cemetery.
