= Molly O'Day =

American actress (1909–1998)

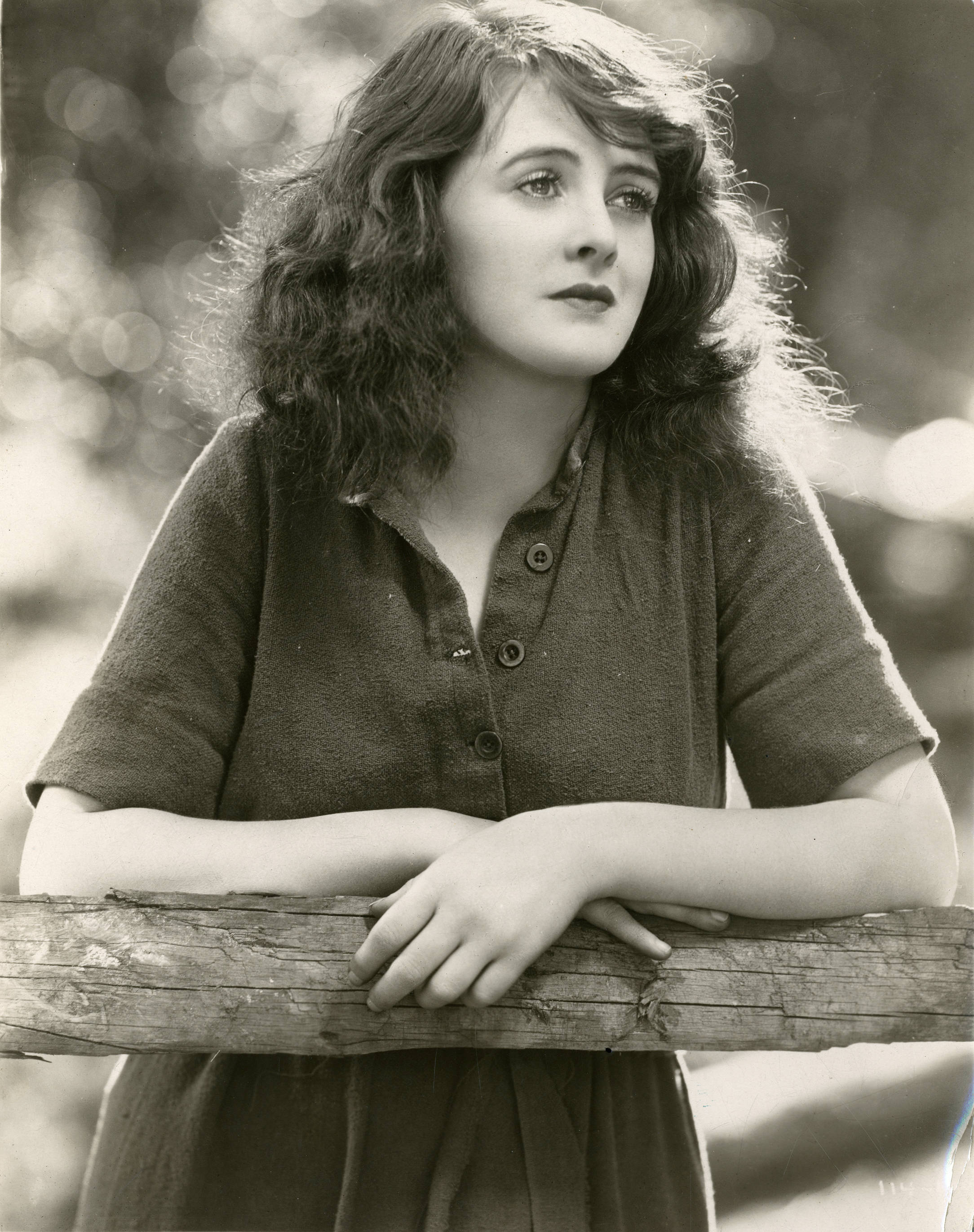
- O'Day in 1928
- Born: Suzanne Dobson Noonan; October 16, 1909; Bayonne, New Jersey, U.S.
- Died: October 15, 1998 (aged 88); Arroyo Grande, California, U.S.
- Occupation: Actress
- Spouses: Jack Durant (m. 1934; div. 1951) James Kenaston (m. 1952; div. 1956)
- Children: 4
- Relatives: Sally O'Neil (sister)

Molly O'Day (born Suzanne Dobson Noonan; October 16, 1909 – October 15, 1998) was an American film actress and the younger sister of Sally O'Neil.

== Early years ==
Born in Bayonne, New Jersey, she was the youngest of 11 children of Judge Thomas Francis Patrick Noonan and his wife, Hannah Kelly, a Metropolitan Opera singer. After their father's death, O'Day and her two sisters moved to Hollywood. Besides O'Neil, another sister, Isabelle, also acted in films. Her brother, John J. Noonan, received a seven-year prison sentence in 1930 for receiving stolen property. Another brother, Victor Noonan, faced two charges of grand larceny, as he was accused in two cases of receiving money to buy stocks that were never purchased. He was arrested in 1934 as a fugitive from justice.

== Career ==
O'Day appeared in minor roles in films early in her career. Her first appearance was in the Laurel and Hardy short 45 Minutes from Hollywood in 1926. She also appeared in Hal Roach's Our Gang series.

Only 16, she defeated 2,000 contenders in an audition for the tough girl heroine in the 1927 prizefighter movie The Patent Leather Kid. One source says that producer Al Rockett chose O'Day for the film after he saw her as one of the extras in a mob scene. Although others preferred to cast a prominent actress in the role, Rockett said, "Either Molly O'Day plays the part or we don't make the picture." When she signed with First National Pictures in 1927 she was initially assigned Kitty Kelly as her screen name. By mid-March 1927 her screen name had been changed to Molly O'Day.

Like O'Neil in 1926, O'Day became one of the WAMPAS Baby Stars in 1928. Also in 1928, she had surgery to "remove several pounds of flesh from her hips and legs." An Associated Press news story reported: "The actress has been gaining weight steadily for the last year and although under contract to a film studio has been idle. Her excessive weight was the cause of her lack of work, Miss O'Day said, and after other flesh reducing methods failed she decided on the surgeon's knife as the final resort."

In June 1930 O'Day and Sally O'Neil headlined the vaudeville bill at the Eighty-sixth Street Theater in New York City.

After appearing in a few dozen films in the 1930s she retired.

== Personal life and death ==
In 1930 O'Day filed a voluntary petition in bankruptcy in Hollywood, listing $200 in assets and $12,798.78 in liabilities.

O'Day married actor Jack Durant in 1934 in Tijuana, Baja California, Mexico. They divorced July 10, 1951, in Los Angeles, California. They had 4 children together.

O'Day died in Arroyo Grande, California, on October 15, 1998.

== Recognition ==
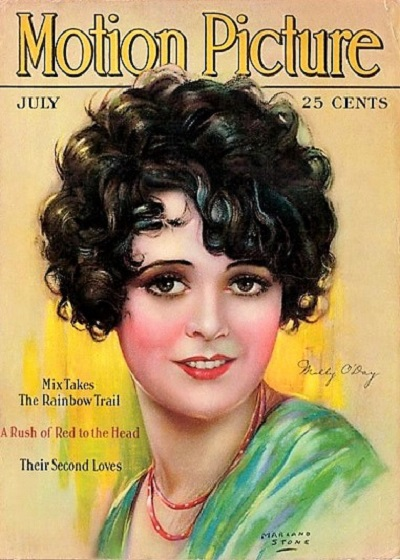
On the cover of Motion Picture (July 1928)

O'Day has a star at 1708 Vine Street in the Motion Pictures category on the Hollywood Walk of Fame. It was dedicated February 8, 1960.

== Filmography ==
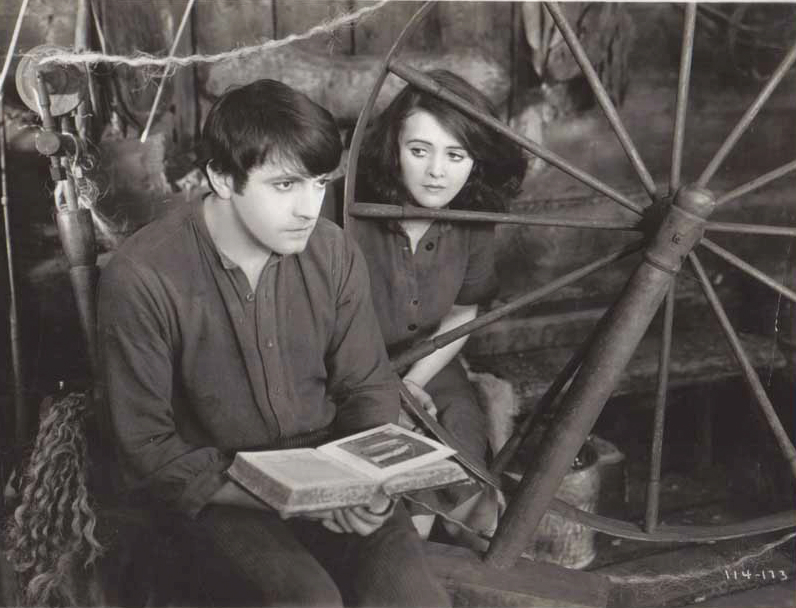
O'Day and Richard Barthelmess in The Little Shepherd of Kingdom Come (1928)

Year	Title	Role	Notes
1926	45 Minutes from Hollywood		Short
1927	The Patent Leather Kid	Curley Boyle, the Golden Dancer	
1927	Hard-Boiled Haggerty	Germaine Benoit	
1927	The Lovelorn	Ann Hastings	
1928	The Shepherd of the Hills	Sammy Lane	
1928	The Little Shepherd of Kingdom Come	Melissa Turner	Lost film
1929	The Show of Shows	Performer in 'Meet My Sister' Number	
1930	Sisters	Molly Shannon	
1931	Sea Devils	Ann McCall	
1931	Sob Sister	Daisy	
1932	Devil on Deck	Kay Wheeler	Lost film
1933	Playthings of Desire	Renee Grant	
1933	Get That Venus	Belle	
1933	Gigolettes of Paris	Paulette	
1934	Hired Wife	Pat Sullivan	
1934	Chloe, Love Is Calling You	Joyce Gordon	
1934	The Life of Vergie Winters	Sadie	
1935	Bars of Hate	Gertie	
1935	The Law of 45's	Joan Hayden	
1935	Lawless Border	Mary Warren	
1935	Skull and Crown	Ann Norton	
