= The Joy Girl =

1927 film by Allan Dwan

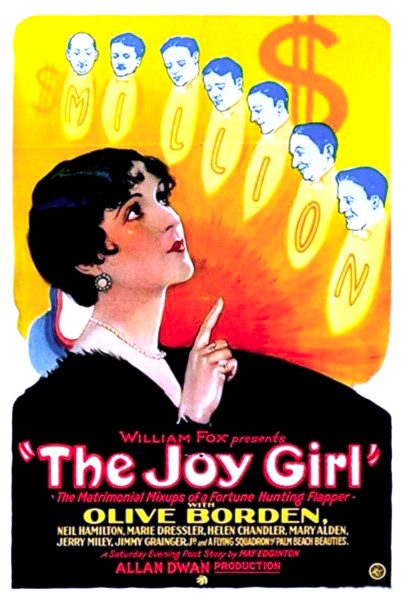
- Theatrical release poster
- Directed by: Allan Dwan
- Written by: Frances Agnew; Malcolm Stuart Boylan; Adele Comandini
- Based on: The Joy Girl by May Edginton
- Produced by: William Fox
- Starring: Olive Borden; Neil Hamilton; Marie Dressler; Mary Alden
- Cinematography: William J. Miller; George Webber
- Color process: Two-color Technicolor
- Production company: Fox Film Corporation
- Distributed by: Fox Film Corporation
- Release date: September 3, 1927
- Running time: 70 minutes
- Country: United States
- Language: Silent (English intertitles)

The Joy Girl is a 1927 American two-strip Technicolor silent comedy film directed by Allan Dwan, released by Fox Film Corporation, starring Olive Borden, Neil Hamilton, and Marie Dressler, and based on the short story of the same name by May Edginton.

== Plot ==
Jewel Courage rejects a suitor, whom she thinks is a chauffeur, in favor of a man she thinks is a millionaire. It transpires that the roles were, in fact, reversed; Hamilton is the millionaire and the other man a chauffeur. Jewel is crushed, but manages to do well for herself in business, until the real millionaire and she find themselves reconciled.

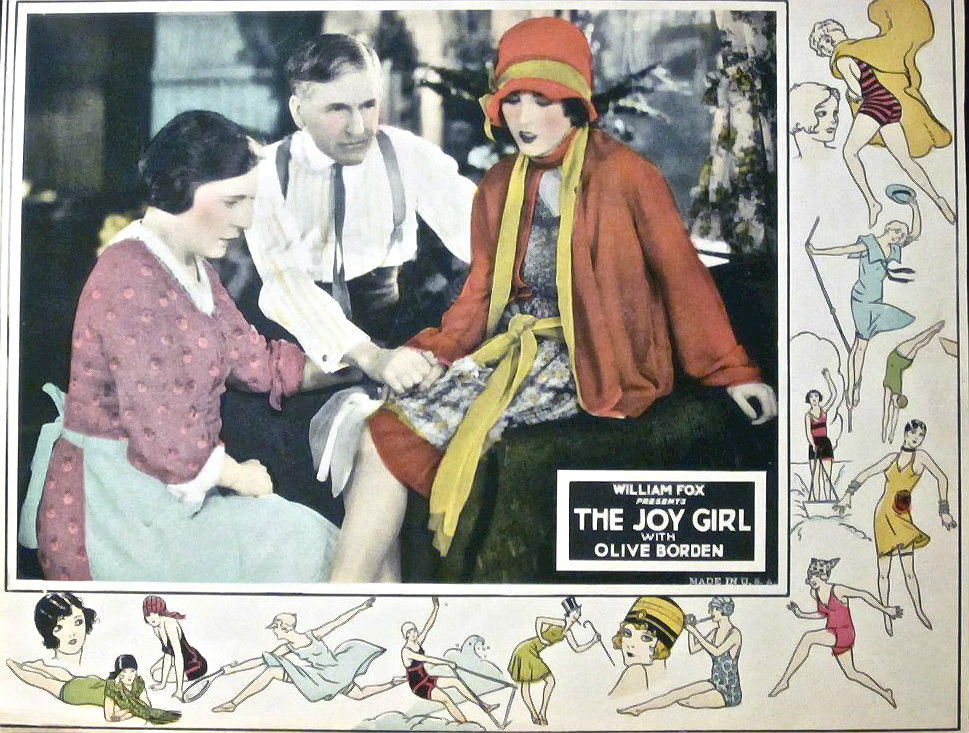
Lobby card

== Cast ==
- Olive Borden as Jewel Courage
- Neil Hamilton as John Jeffrey Fleet
- Marie Dressler as Mrs. Heath
- Mary Alden as Mrs. Courage
- William Norris as Herbert Courage
- Helen Chandler as Flora
- Jerry Miley as Vicary
- Frank Walsh as Hugh Sandman
- Clarence Elmer as Valet
- Peggy Kelly as Isolde
- Jimmy Grainger Jr. as Chauffeur
- Betty Byrne (uncredited)
- Ursula Fisher (uncredited)
- Edna Wilson (uncredited)

== Production ==
Location filming took place in Palm Beach, Florida. Either part or all of the film was shot in Technicolor. It was the last film to be shot in the second Technicolor process ("System 2"), before the company's implementation of a new, improved format in 1928.

== Preservation status ==
A print of The Joy Girl with Czech intertitles is held at the Museum of Modern Art.

== See also ==
- List of early color feature films
