= Hello Cheyenne =

1928 film

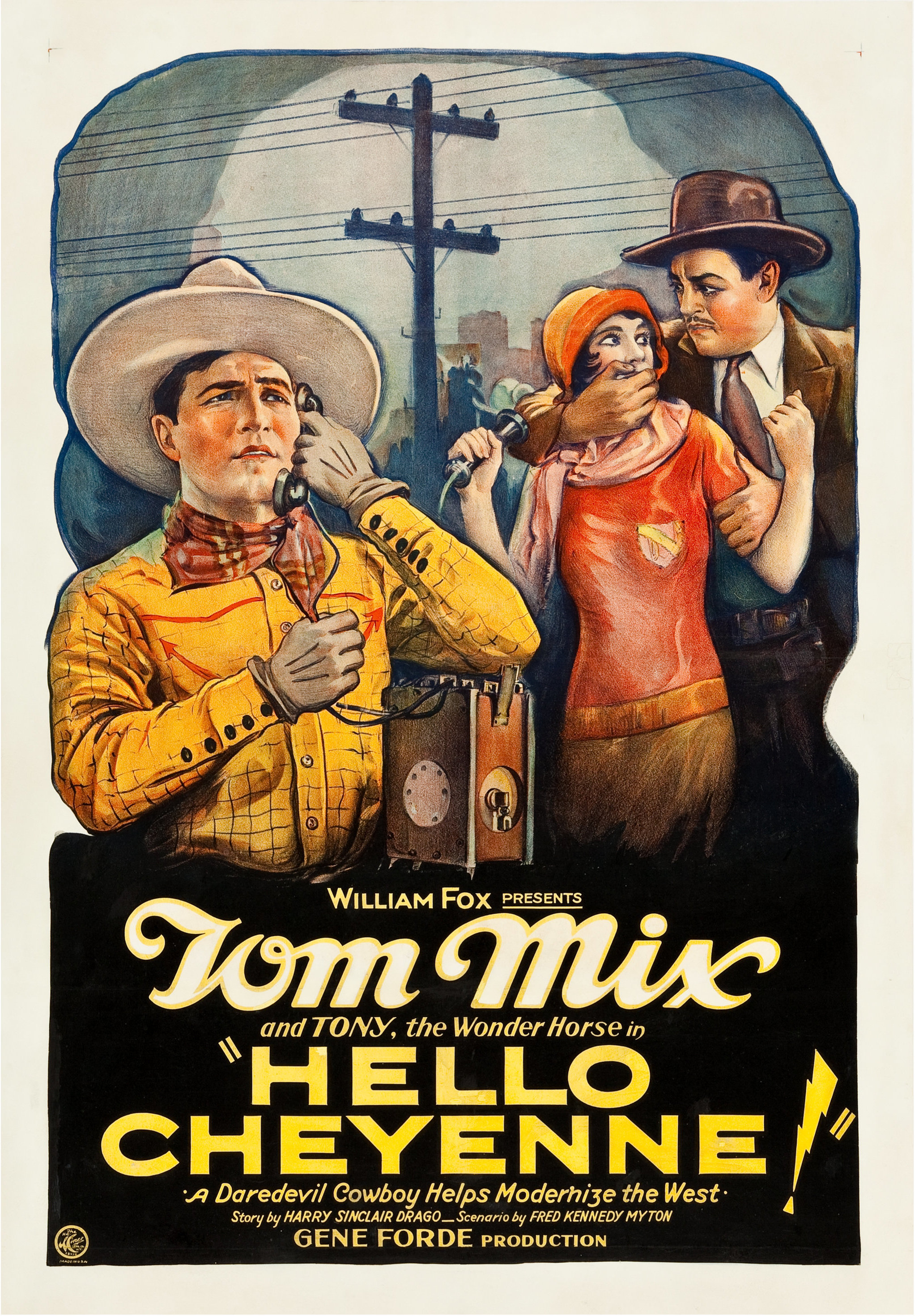
- Directed by: Eugene Forde
- Written by: Harry Sinclair Drago; Dudley Early; Fred Myton
- Starring: Tom Mix; Caryl Lincoln; Jack Baston
- Cinematography: Daniel B. Clark
- Edited by: Robert Bischoff
- Production company: Fox Film
- Distributed by: Fox Film
- Release date: May 13, 1928
- Running time: 80 minutes
- Country: United States
- Languages: Silent; English intertitles

Hello Cheyenne or Hello Cheyenne! is a 1928 American silent Western film directed by Eugene Forde and starring Tom Mix, Caryl Lincoln and Jack Baston. Two rival telephone companies attempt to be the first to connect Cheyenne in Wyoming.

== Cast ==
- Tom Mix as Tom Remington
- Tony the Wonder Horse as Tom's Horse
- Caryl Lincoln as Diana Cody
- Jack Baston as Buck Lassiter
- Martin Faust as Jeff Bardeen
- Joseph W. Girard as Fremont Cody
- William Caress as Bus Driver
- Al St. John as Zip Coon

== Bibliography ==
- Jensen, Richard D. The Amazing Tom Mix: The Most Famous Cowboy of the Movies. 2005.
