= Chloe, Love Is Calling You =

- Home Video Cover Of The Film.
- Directed by: Marshall Neilan
- Written by: Marshall Neilan (story and screenplay)
- Produced by: J. D. Trop (producer)
- Cinematography: Mack Stengler
- Edited by: Joseph Josephson; Helene Turner
- Music by: George Henninger
- Production company: Sun Haven Studios
- Distributed by: Pinnacle Productions
- Release date: April 1, 1934
- Running time: 62 minutes 54 minutes (Home video release)
- Country: United States
- Language: English

The Home Movie Cut.

Chloe, Love Is Calling You is a 1934 American pre-Code drama film directed by Marshall Neilan. The film is also known as Chloe (American short title). This was lead actress Olive Borden's last film.

== Plot summary ==
A low-budget Southern drama about a light skinned woman who was raised in the swamps who wishes to avenge her black father's lynching. She falls in love with Wade Carson, a white man who works for Col. Gordon, who orchestrated the lynching. Later she discovers that Col. Gordon is actually her father.

== Cast ==
- Olive Borden as Chloe (Betty Ann Gordon)
- Reed Howes as Wade Carson
- Molly O'Day as Joyce, the Colonel's niece
- Philip Ober as Jim Strong
- Georgette Harvey as Old Mandy
- Francis Joyner as Col. Gordon
- J. Augustus Smith as Mose, a Thieving Worker
- Jess Cavin as Hill, a Thieving Worker
- Richard Huey as Ben, the Servant

== Reception ==
Like many American films of the time, Chloe, Love Is Calling You was subject to review by city and state film censorship boards. The Ohio board banned the film.

== Soundtrack ==
- "Chloe" (Music by Neil Moret, lyrics by Gus Kahn)
