= Painted Post (film) =

1928 film directed by Eugene Forde

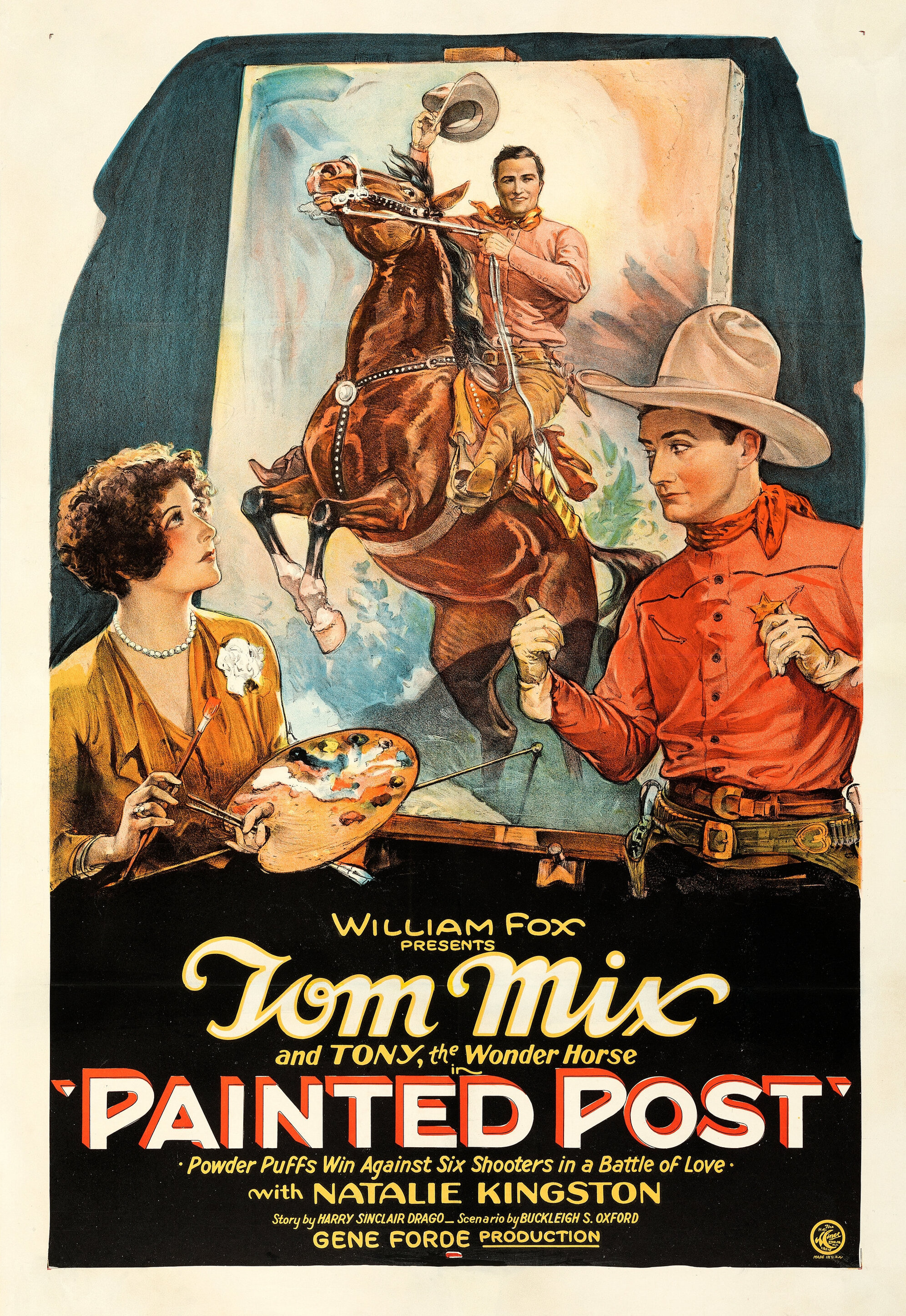
- Film poster
- Directed by: Eugene Forde
- Written by: Harry Sinclair Drago; Buckleigh Fritz Oxford; Delos Sutherland
- Starring: Tom Mix; Natalie Kingston; Philo McCullough
- Cinematography: Daniel B. Clark
- Edited by: Robert Bischoff
- Production company: Fox Film
- Distributed by: Fox Film
- Release date: July 1, 1928
- Running time: 50 minutes
- Country: United States
- Languages: Silent; English intertitles

Painted Post is a 1928 American silent Western film directed by Eugene Forde and starring Tom Mix, Natalie Kingston and Philo McCullough. It was the final release Mix appeared in for Fox Film, having been one of their biggest stars during the decade. A print of Painted Post survives complete.

== Cast ==
- Tom Mix as Tom Blake
- Tony the Horse as Tony
- Natalie Kingston as Barbara Lane
- Philo McCullough as Ben Tuttle
- Al St. John as Joe Nimble
- Fred Gamble as Theatrical Manager

== Bibliography ==
- Jensen, Richard D. The Amazing Tom Mix: The Most Famous Cowboy of the Movies. 2005.
