= Hired Wife (1934 film) =

1934 film

- Directed by: George Melford
- Written by: Alma Sioux Scarberry
- Based on: The Flat Tire by Alma Sioux Scarberry
- Produced by: Raymond Friedgen
- Starring: Greta Nissen; Weldon Heyburn; James Kirkwood
- Cinematography: Mack Stengler
- Edited by: Helene Turner
- Music by: George Henninger
- Production company: Sun Haven Studios
- Distributed by: Pinnacle Productions
- Release date: March 1, 1934
- Running time: 60 minutes
- Country: United States
- Language: English

Hired Wife is a 1934 American drama film directed by George Melford and starring Greta Nissen, Weldon Heyburn and James Kirkwood. It was produced as a second feature by the independent company Pinnacle Productions. It was shot at the Sun Haven Studios in Florida rather than in Hollywood. Location shooting took place at the Soreno Hotel in St. Petersburg, Florida.

== Cast ==
- Greta Nissen as Vivian Mathews
- Weldon Heyburn as Kent Johns
- James Kirkwood as Philip Marlowe
- Molly O'Day as Pat Sullivan
- Jane Winton as Dovie Jansen
- Blanche Taylor as Mrs. Jansen
- Carolyn Gales as Aunt Mancha
- Evelyn Bennett as Celeste
- Johnnie Lee a s Hotel Bellboy
- Bob Miller as Hotel Bellboy
- James Peters as Airport Truck Driver
- Patricia Jean Worthington as Party Guest

== Bibliography ==
- Pitts, Michael R. Poverty Row Studios, 1929–1940. McFarland & Company, 2005.
- Wollstein, Hans J. Strangers in Hollywood: the history of Scandinavian actors in American films from 1910 to World War II. Scarecrow Press, 1994.
