= Philip Ober =

American actor (1902–1982)

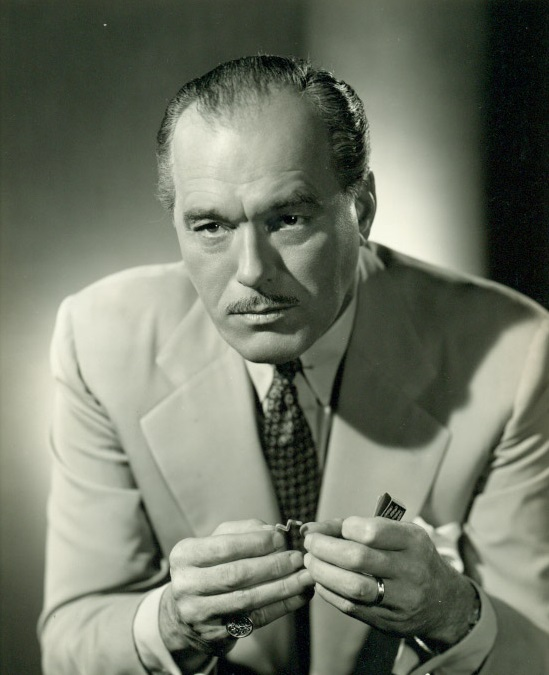
- Ober in 1950
- Born: Philip Nott Ober; March 23, 1902; Fort Payne, Alabama, U.S.
- Died: September 13, 1982 (aged 80); Santa Monica, California, U.S. or Mexico City
- Education: Princeton University
- Occupation: Actor
- Years active: 1931–1968
- Spouses: Phyllis Roper (m. 1923; div. 1941) Vivian Vance (m. 1941; div. 1959) Jane Westover (m. 1961)
- Children: 1

Philip Nott Ober (March 23, 1902 – September 13, 1982) was an American screen and stage actor who later retired from performing to be a foreign service diplomat.

Ober is best remembered for his roles in the films From Here to Eternity (1953) and North by Northwest (1959). His other notable credits include The Magnificent Yankee (1950), Broken Lance (1954), Torpedo Run (1958) and The Ugly American (1963).

== Early years ==
The son of Frank Ober, he was raised in White Plains, New York. After attending The Peddie School and Princeton University, he worked in advertising before moving into acting. In a 1935 interview, he claimed "I got kicked out of Princeton in sophomore year."

== Acting career ==
Ober often appeared in roles as a straight man in farcical circumstances. He made his debut on stage, playing Tom Faulkner in Technique in 1931. He appeared in Lawrence Riley's Broadway show Personal Appearance (1934) opposite Gladys George.

Ober's film debut came in Chloe, Love Is Calling You (1934).

From 1954 to 1967, he frequently appeared in television series. He appeared in the episode "The Vultures" of Sugarfoot.

Ober was twice cast on I Love Lucy, first playing "Arnold" in episode 5, "The Quiz Show," and later portraying the Hollywood producer Dore Schary in episode 119, "Don Juan is Shelved" when Schary decided at the last minute not to play himself. He made five appearances on Perry Mason, including that of defendant Peter Dawson in the 1960 episode, "The Case of the Treacherous Toupee", and the dual role of murder victim Sumner Hodge and his brother Adrian Hodge in the 1964 episode, "The Case of the Tandem Target". He also appeared in one episode of The Twilight Zone ("Spur of the Moment"), co-starring Diana Hyland, and in one episode ("Bankrupt Alibi") of Whirlybirds in which he portrayed a man who convinces his son to take the blame for a hit-and-run accident he committed. He made one guest appearance on the 1961 crime adventure-drama series The Investigators and four on the comedy series Hazel. Also in 1961, he appeared as "General Silas Guild" in the TV Western series Bat Masterson (S3E18 "The Prescott Campaign"). He played Colonel Hoey in "The Alfred Hitchcock Hour" S1 E4 episode "I Saw the Whole Thing" in 1962. He had a recurring role as General Wingard Stone in the early episodes of I Dream of Jeannie, appeared in two episodes of McHale's Navy as tough-as-nails Admiral "Iron Pants" Rafferty, and played the museum curator Dr. Wilkerson in episode 32 of The Munsters, "Mummy Munster," in 1965.

Ober continued to work as an actor in films. He played the United Nations ambassador in Alfred Hitchcock's North by Northwest (1959) whom Roger Thornhill (Cary Grant) meets, to clarify who had occupied his mansion. He also played Capt. Dana "Dynamite" Holmes, the neglectful, unsympathetic husband of Karen Holmes (Deborah Kerr), in the film version of From Here to Eternity (1953).

== Post-acting career ==
He retired from acting and went into the U.S. diplomatic service, serving as consular agent to the U.S. consul in Puerto Vallarta, Mexico.

== Personal life ==
Ober's uncle was American naturalist and writer Frederick A. Ober. and was married to the former Phyllis Ober.

On August 12, 1941, Ober married actress Vivian Vance. Ober was known for being physically and emotionally abusive towards Vance, and the two eventually divorced in 1959.

Ober's third marriage was to Jane Westover; they were married from 1961 until Ober's death in 1982.

== Death ==
Although many sources report that Ober died of a heart attack in Mexico City at the age of 80, Associated Press obituaries quote a hospital spokesperson stating Ober died of lung cancer at Santa Monica Hospital in Santa Monica, California, on September 13, 1982. The California Death Index and Social Security Death Index substantiate this information.

== Filmography ==
- 1934: Chloe, Love Is Calling You as Jim Strong
- 1938: Little Me
- 1950: The Secret Fury as Gregory Kent
- 1950: Never a Dull Moment as Jed
- 1950: The Magnificent Yankee as Owen Wister / Narrator
- 1951: The Unknown Man as Wayne Kellwin
- 1952: Washington Story as Gilbert Nunnally
- 1952: Come Back, Little Sheba as Ed Anderson
- 1953: The Clown as Ralph Z. Henderson
- 1953: The Girls of Pleasure Island as Colonel Reade
- 1953: Scandal at Scourie as B. G. Belney
- 1953: From Here to Eternity as Captain Dana 'Dynamite' Holmes
- 1954: About Mrs. Leslie as Mort Finley
- 1954: Broken Lance as Van Cleve
- 1956: Calling Terry Conway (TV Movie) as Stan
- 1957: Tammy and the Bachelor as Alfred Bissle
- 1957: Escapade in Japan as Lieutenant Colonel Hargrave
- 1958: The High Cost of Loving as Herb Zorn
- 1958: Ten North Frederick as Lloyd Williams
- 1958: Torpedo Run as Admiral Samuel Setton
- 1959: The Mating Game as Wendell Burnshaw
- 1959: North by Northwest as Lester Townsend
- 1959: Beloved Infidel as John Wheeler
- 1960: Elmer Gantry as Reverend Planck
- 1960: Let No Man Write My Epitaph as Grant Holloway
- 1960: The Facts of Life as Doc Mason
- 1961: Go Naked in the World as Josh Kebner
- 1961: The Crimebusters as Herman Hauzner
- 1963: The Ugly American as Ambassador Sears
- 1964: The Brass Bottle as William Beevor
- 1966: The Ghost and Mr. Chicken as Nicholas Simmons
- 1968: Assignment to Kill as Bohlen (final film role)

== Television ==
Year	Title	Role	Notes
1955	I Love Lucy	Dore Schary	Season 4 Episode 21: "Don Juan Is Shelved"
1955	Science Fiction Theater	-	Season 1 Episode 39: "The Other Side of the Moon"
1962	Alfred Hitchcock Presents	Wilton Stark	Season 7 Episode 21: "Burglar Proof"
1962	The Alfred Hitchcock Hour	Colonel John Hoey	Season 1 Episode 4: "I Saw the Whole Thing"
1966	The Dick van Dyke Show	Mr. Howard	Season 5 Episode 16: "I Do Not Choose to Run"
1967	The Monkees	Mr. Weatherwax	Season 1 Episode 30: "Monkees in Manhattan"
