= Sinners in Love =

1928 film by George Melford

Sinners in Heaven
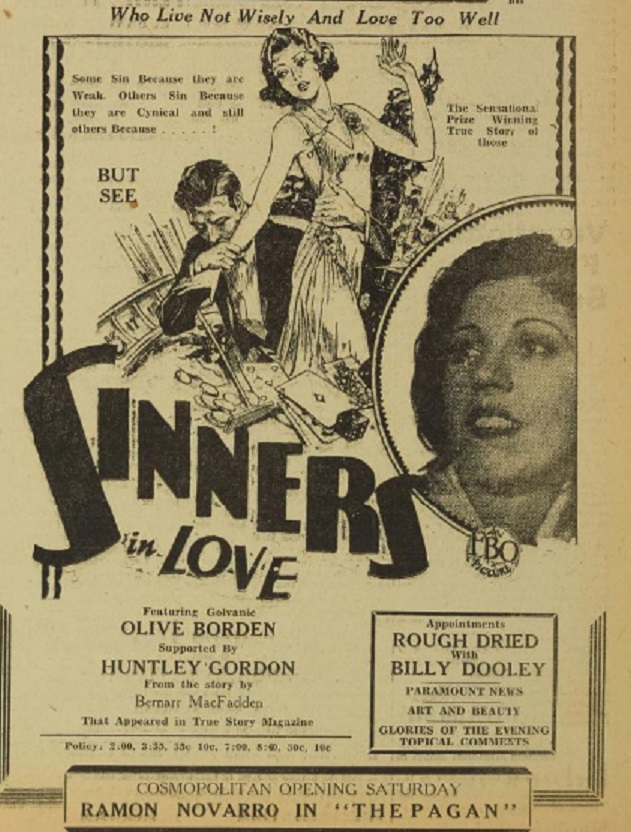
- Film poster
- Directed by: George Melford
- Distributed by: Film Booking Offices of America
- Release date: November 4, 1928
- Running time: 6 reels
- Country: USA
- Language: Silent (English intertitles)

Sinners in Love is a 1928 silent film comedy directed by George Melford and starring Olive Borden and Seena Owen. It was produced and released by Film Booking Offices of America (FBO).

== Cast ==
- Olive Borden as Ann Hardy
- Huntley Gordon as Ted Wells
- Seena Owen as Yvonne D'Orsy
- Ernest Hilliard as Silk Oliver
- Daphne Pollard as Mabel
- Phillips Smalley as Spencer
- Henry Roquemore as (uncredited)

== Preservation status ==
- The film survives at Bois du Arcy.
