= Harry Sinclair Drago =

American screenwriter and novelist (1887–1979)

- Born: March 20, 1887; Toledo, Ohio, U.S.
- Died: October 25, 1979 (aged 92); White Plains, New York, U.S.
- Occupations: Novelist, screenwriter, historian
- Spouse: Herminne Drago
- Children: Tom R. Drago
- Writing career
- Pen name: Stewart Cross, Kirk Deming, Will Ermine, Bliss Lomax, J. Wesley Putnam, Grant Sinclair
- Genres: Western fiction, American Old West history
- Notable works: Wild, Woolly & Wicked (1960); Outlaws on Horseback (1964); The Great Range Wars (1970)
- Notable awards: Buffalo Award (1960); Western Heritage Award (1971)

Harry Sinclair Drago (March 20, 1887 – October 25, 1979) was an American novelist, screenwriter, and historian, known for his prolific output of Western fiction and his histories of the American Old West. Over a career spanning more than five decades, he published over 100 books, averaging roughly three per year, many under pseudonyms including Stewart Cross, Kirk Deming, Will Ermine, Bliss Lomax, J. Wesley Putnam, and Grant Sinclair. His Western novels were popular enough that President Dwight D. Eisenhower reportedly named Bliss Lomax and Will Ermine—both Drago pen names—as two of his favorite authors.

== Early life and journalism career ==
Drago was born on March 20, 1887, in Toledo, Ohio. He began his writing career as a reporter and columnist for the Toledo Bee. His first novel, Suzanna: A Romance of Early California, was published in 1922 by The Macaulay Company of New York.

== Hollywood career ==
In 1928, Drago relocated to Hollywood to work as a screenwriter, a period that lasted until 1933 and encompassed the transition from silent films to sound pictures. He contributed scripts primarily to Westerns and adventure films, frequently writing for cowboy stars of the silent era including Tom Mix, Buck Jones, and Ken Maynard. His credits from this period include story and screenplay work on Hello Cheyenne (1928) and Painted Post (1928), both starring Tom Mix, as well as The Overland Telegraph (1929) with Tim McCoy. He also provided the story for Where East Is East (1929), a drama directed by Tod Browning and starring Lon Chaney, and wrote the screenplay for the early sound serial The King of the Kongo (1929). During this period he also wrote novelizations of several major studio films for publisher A. L. Burt, including The Champ, Madam Satan, and Rio Rita.

== Western fiction ==
After leaving Hollywood in 1933, Drago settled in New York and devoted himself to writing books. He was an exceptionally productive novelist, typically writing 1,000 words per day; in one instance, he completed the 60,000-word novel Oh, Susannah in just eleven days. He placed strong emphasis on historical authenticity in his Westerns, consulting period atlases and wall maps for geographical accuracy and committing the names of more than 1,800 counties to memory to ground his fiction in real locations.

His Western novels include Out of the Silent North, Whispering Sage, Trigger Gospel, Following the Grass, Laramie Rides Alone, Buckskin Affair, Fenced Off, and Decision at Broken Butte. Many of his most popular novels appeared under the pseudonyms Bliss Lomax and Will Ermine.

== Historical non-fiction ==
In his later career, Drago transitioned from fiction to non-fiction histories of the American West. These works covered a range of subjects including cattle trails, frontier outlaws, steamboat navigation, and Western banditry. Notable titles include Wild, Woolly & Wicked: The History of the Kansas Cow Towns and the Texas Cattle Trade (1960); Outlaws on Horseback (1964), chronicling organized gangs of bank and train robbers; The Steamboaters (1967), on the history of steamboat travel; The Great Range Wars: Violence on the Grasslands (1970), which he wrote at the age of 82; and Canal Days in America (1972), on the history of American towpaths and waterways.

== Awards and recognition ==
Drago's Wild, Woolly and Wicked received the Buffalo Award for best Western book of the year in 1960. His The Great Range Wars was honored with the Western Heritage Award from the National Cowboy Hall of Fame in 1971 for outstanding Western non-fiction.

Drago was a member of the Publication Committee of the Westerners, New York Posse, a non-profit educational organization dedicated to preserving the cultural history of the American West.

== Personal life ==
Drago married Herminne Drago, who survived him, as did their son, Tom R. Drago. He spent his later years in White Plains, New York, where he died on October 25, 1979, at the age of 92.

== Partial filmography ==
- Out of the Silent North (1922)
- Playthings of Desire (1924)
- Whispering Sage (1927)
- Silver Valley (1927)
- A Horseman of the Plains (1928)
- Hello Cheyenne (1928)
- Painted Post (1928)
- The Cowboy Kid (1928)
- The Overland Telegraph (1929)
- Where East Is East (1929)
- The Desert Rider (1929)
- The King of the Kongo (1929)
- Lotus Lady (1930)
- Murder in the Library (1933) (from Playthings of Desire)
- Secret of the Wastelands (1941)
- Buckskin Frontier (1943)
- The Leather Burners (1943)
- Colt Comrades (1943)

== Selected bibliography ==
=== Novels ===
- Suzanna: A Romance of Early California (1922)
- Out of the Silent North
- Whispering Sage
- Trigger Gospel
- Following the Grass
- Laramie Rides Alone
- Montana Road
- Pay-Off at Black Hawk
- Guardians of the Sage
- Where the Loon Calls
- River of Gold
- Showdown at Sunset
- This Way to Hell (1933; as Stewart Cross)
- The Loner (1956; as Bliss Lomax)

=== Non-fiction ===
- Wild, Woolly & Wicked: The History of the Kansas Cow Towns and the Texas Cattle Trade (1960)
- Outlaws on Horseback (1964)
- The Steamboaters: From the Early Side-Wheelers to the Big Packets (1967)
- The Great Range Wars: Violence on the Grasslands (1970)
- Canal Days in America: The History and Romance of Old Towpaths and Waterways (1972)
- Road Agents and Train Robbers: Half a Century of Western Banditry (1973)
- Great American Cattle Trails: The Story of the Old Cow Paths of the East and the Longhorn Highways of the Plains
- Lost Bonanzas: Tales of the Legendary Lost Mines of the Old West
- Notorious Ladies of the Frontier
- The Legend Makers: Tales of the Old-Time Peace Officers and Desperadoes of the Frontier

=== Screenplay novelizations ===
Published by A. L. Burt, circa 1929–1932:

- The Champ
- Madam Satan
- Rio Rita
- The Singer of Seville
- The Trespasser

== Legacy ==
Drago's papers are held at Syracuse University and the American Heritage Center at the University of Wyoming.
