= Sun Haven Studios =

Florida movie company

- Formerly: Kennedy Studios
- Type: Private
- Industry: Film
- Founded: 1933
- Founder: Aubrey M. Kennedy
- Defunct: 1934
- Fate: Closed
- Headquarters: Weedon Island, Florida

Sun Haven Studios was a movie company located on Weedon Island in St. Petersburg, Florida during the early 1930s. Originally founded as Kennedy Studios by Hollywood director Aubrey M. Kennedy, it was renamed to Sun Haven after being purchased by local investors. It produced only three movies: Playthings of Desire (1933), Hired Wife (1934) and Chloe, Love Is Calling You (1934). All of the lead actors were minor players from Hollywood.

In addition to these three productions, the company had several adaptations from popular novels in development, including The Mad Dancer, Ermine and Rhinestones, Wings of Pride, Her Indiscretion and Madonnas and Men. Buster Keaton did come to the studios to work on revitalizing his career but left before making any movies. The studio was closed shortly thereafter.

In late 1933, pulp writer Eustace L. Adams, who wintered in the St. Petersburg area, was working on a script for the Sun Haven film Gambler's Throw, based on his 1930 Argosy magazine serial.
