= Olive Borden =

American actress (1906–1947)

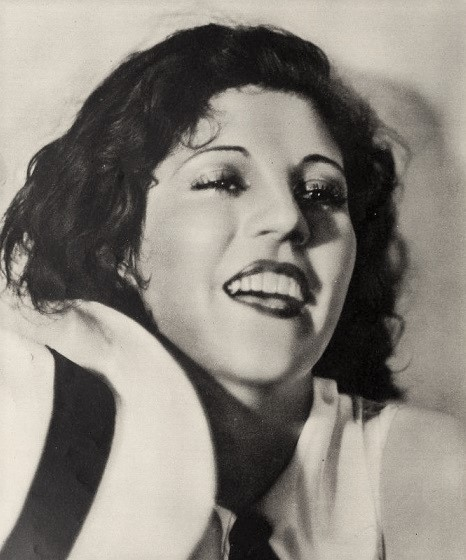
- Olive Borden in 1929
- Born: July 14, 1907; Richmond, Virginia, U.S.
- Died: October 1, 1947 (aged 40); Los Angeles, California, U.S.
- Resting place: Forest Lawn Memorial Park, Glendale, California
- Other name: The Joy Girl
- Occupation: Actress
- Years active: 1924–1934
- Spouses: Theodore Spector (m. 1931; ann. 1932) John Moeller (m. 1934; div. 1941)
- Relatives: Natalie Joyce (cousin)

Olive Mary Borden (July 14, 1907 – October 1, 1947) was an American film and stage actress who began her career during the silent film era. She was nicknamed "the Joy Girl", after playing the lead in the 1927 film of that same title. Borden was known for her jet-black hair and stunning overall beauty.

At the peak of her career in the mid-1920s, Borden was earning $1,500 a week. In 1927, she walked out on her contract with Fox after refusing to take a pay cut. By 1929, her career began to wane due to her rumored reputation for being temperamental and her difficulty transitioning to sound films. She made her last film, Chloe, Love Is Calling You, in 1934 and moved on to stage work for a time. By the late 1930s, she had declared bankruptcy and stopped acting. During World War II, she joined the Women's Army Corps. She was later honorably discharged with distinction after sustaining a foot injury during service. Borden attempted a comeback in films, however, she was hindered by her alcoholism and health problems.

In 1945, she began working at the Sunshine Mission, a home for impoverished women located in a formerly skidrow section of Los Angeles. She died there in October 1947 of a stomach ailment and pneumonia at the age of 40.

== Early life ==
Borden was born in Richmond, Virginia on July 14, 1907. It was often erroneously reported that Sybil Tinkle was Borden's real name, until the 1990s when it was discovered that another woman had been confused with Borden. In a 1910 census report, her name is listed as Borden. Her father Harry Robinson Borden (1880–1907) died when she was a baby and she was raised by her mother Cecelia "Sibbie" Shields (1884–1959) in Norfolk, Virginia, and Baltimore, Maryland, where she attended Catholic boarding schools. Through her father, she was a fourth cousin of Lizzie Borden.

== Career ==
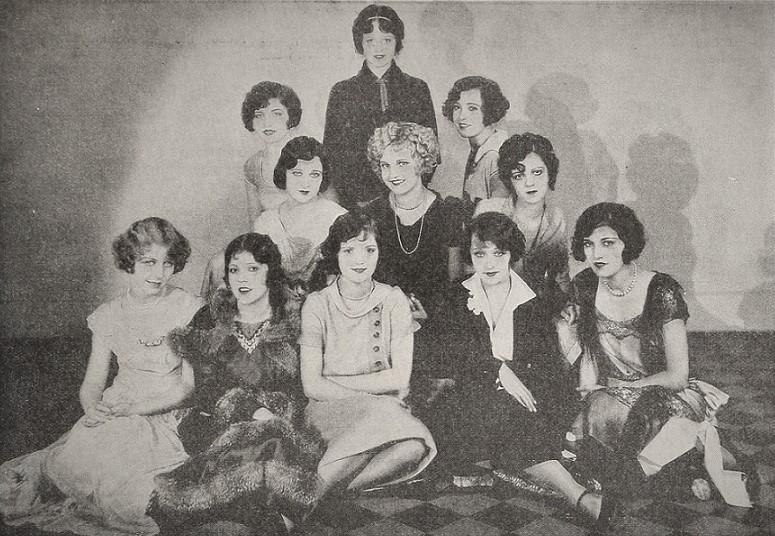
1925 WAMPAS: Borden, seated, second from left

Borden began her career as one of the Sennett Bathing Beauties in 1922 and was soon appearing as a vamp in Hal Roach comedy shorts. Producer Paul Bern chose her for an uncredited role in his film The Dressmaker from Paris (1925). She was signed by Fox after being named a WAMPAS Baby Star in 1925 (along with her cousin, Natalie Joyce). Borden quickly became one of their most popular and highest paid stars earning a salary of $1,500 a week. She had starring roles in eleven films at Fox, including 3 Bad Men and Fig Leaves, both of which costarred her then-boyfriend George O'Brien. 3 Bad Men has also been featured at the Museum of Modern Art. During this time she worked with some directors who would go on to achieve major fame, including John Ford, Howard Hawks, and Leo McCarey.

Paramount Studios began a policy of 10% paycuts on any salary over $50 to recoup production costs, when Fox tried the same and cut her salary in 1927, Borden left the studio. By this point she was a major film star. In making the transition to "talkies" she worked with a voice coach (to suppress her Southern accent). She was less successful, but still remained in demand as an actress, continuing to work for Columbia and RKO. She had cut her trademark hair into a short bob, and turned herself into a modern flapper. But Borden had trouble with the new look, losing her identity; she couldn't find her audience and this confused her waning public.

She made few movies in the early 1930s and her once promising career stalled, producing but one picture in 1932 (The Divorce Racket), and three in 1933 (Leave it to Me, Hotel Variety, and The Mild West). Her last screen credit came in the 1934 film Chloe, Love Is Calling You, where she played a woman kidnapped at birth and raised as a child of mixed race. Some say that this once-lost film "is so bad it should've stayed lost." A pre-code movie made under Will Hays, it had little box office success and in some states (mostly southern) it was banned at the time of its release. Borden then moved to New York, where she had a brief stage career, and made a living on the waning vaudeville circuit.

== Later years ==
During her acting career, Borden was one of the highest paid stars. She spent her money freely and by the late 1930s, she was broke. Borden then found work as a postal clerk and mail carrier and also worked as a nurse's aide. In December 1942, Borden joined the Women's Army Corps (the Women's Army Corps, the only non-Nurse Corps element that women could serve in the Army at that time) where she served as an ambulance driver and received an Army citation for bravery in turning over an enemy ammunition truck. Her Army career ended in 1944, with an honorable discharge after she was hospitalized in Walter Reed Medical Center with a severe foot injury. After her discharge, she attempted an unsuccessful comeback in films.

Borden struggled with alcoholism and numerous health problems. She spent her final years in the skid row section of Los Angeles working and living at the Sunshine Mission, a home for women alongside her mother Sibbie, who got Borden the work.

== Personal life ==
Cover of a 1928 magazine with Borden on the cover, tagline asking "Is any star really happy?"

Borden had several relationships with men, in and out of the motion picture industry. For the majority of her life, she lived with her mother, Sibbie, who was known as a "stage mother", helping Borden with most decisions and spending of money until Borden's death. From 1926 to 1930, Borden was romantically involved with actor George O'Brien and the press reported they were engaged. She also dated director Marshall Neilan and producer Paul Bern.

Borden was married twice. Her first marriage was to stockbroker Theodore Spector, whom she married on March 28, 1931, in Harrison, New York. The marriage was rocky from the start, and the couple separated in early 1932 after news of scandal broke that she was involved in a love triangle. Spector had not divorced his first wife, Pearl, whom he married in 1919, and he was arrested for bigamy after his first wife came forward and claimed they were still married. In November 1932, Borden petitioned the court for an annulment, which was granted on November 22. Spector was ultimately cleared of bigamy, but Borden had the marriage annulled and moved on from the entire incident. She married her second husband, 26-year-old railroad technician, John Moeller, in November 1934 under the pseudonym Mary Borden.

== Death ==
Borden died on October 1, 1947, from complications of pneumonia at the age of 40. The only possession she had when she died was a signed photo of herself. Borden's funeral was held on October 3 at the Sunshine Mission home for women, where she had worked and lived since 1945. The mission's founder, Essie Binkley West, officiated at the service. Borden was buried at Forest Lawn Memorial Park in Glendale, California. Her mother was interred in the grave next to her when she died of a heart attack in 1959.

For her contributions to the film industry, Borden has a motion pictures star on the Hollywood Walk of Fame at 6801 Hollywood Boulevard. She was one of the first eight stars chosen to receive a star in 1958.

== Selected filmography ==
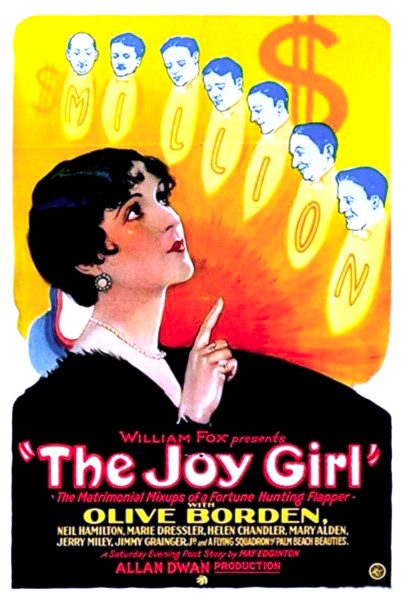
Poster for one of Borden's most famous films, The Joy Girl (1927), which is described as depicting "The Matrimonial Mixups of a Fortune Hunting Flapper!"

Year	Title	Role	Notes
1924	Neck and Neck		
1924	Wide Open		
1924	Air Pockets		
1924	Why Men Work		
1924	Should Landlords Live?		
1924	Too Many Mamas		
1924	The Royal Razz		
1924	Just a Good Guy		
1925	Should Husbands be Watched?	The New Maid	
1925	The Dressmaker from Paris		Lost film
1925	Bad Boy	Undetermined Role	Uncredited
1925	Tell It to a Policeman		
1925	Good Morning, Nurse!		Lost film
1925	The Happy Warrior	Ima	Lost film
1925	The Overland Limited	Ruth Dent	
1926	The Yankee Señor	Manuelita	Alternative title: The Conquering Blood; Lost film
1926	My Own Pal	Alice Deering	Lost film
1926	Yellow Fingers	Saina	
1926	3 Bad Men	Lee Carlton	
1926	Fig Leaves	Eve Smith	
1926	The Country Beyond	Valencia	Lost film
1927	The Monkey Talks	Olivette	
1927	The Secret Studio	Rosemary Merton	Lost film
1927	The Joy Girl	Jewel Courage	
1927	Pajamas	Angela Wade	
1927	Come to My House	Joan Century	Lost film
1928	The Albany Night Boat	Georgie	Lost film
1928	Virgin Lips	Norma	Lost film
1928	Gang War	Flowers	Alternative title: All Square; Lost film
1928	Stool Pigeon	Goldie	Alternative title: The Decoy
1928	Sinners in Love	Ann Hardy	
1929	Love in the Desert	Zarah	
1929	The Eternal Woman	Anita	
1929	Half Marriage	Judy Paige	
1929	Dance Hall	Gracie Nolan	
1929	Wedding Rings	Eve Quinn	Alternative title: The Dark Swan, lost film
1930	Hello Sister	Vee Newell	
1930	The Social Lion	Gloria Staunton	
1932	The Divorce Racket	Marie Douglas	
1933	Hotel Variety		Alternative title: The Passing Show
1933	Leave It to Me	Peavey	Alternative title: Help
1933	The Mild West	Baby Doll	Short film
1934	The Inventors		Uncredited
1934	Chloe, Love Is Calling You	Chloe (Betty Ann Gordon)	

== Footnotes ==
=== Works cited ===
- Ankerich, Michael G. (2010). Dangerous Curves Atop Hollywood Heels: The Lives, Careers, and Misfortunes of 14 Hard-Luck Girls of the Silent Screen. BearManor. ISBN 1-59393-605-2
- Brettell, Andrew; Imwold, Denise; Kennedy, Damien (2005). Cut!: Hollywood Murders, Accidents and Other Tragedies. Barrons Educational Series. ISBN 9780764158582. OCLC 659908036.
- Klepper, Robert K. (1999). Silent Films, 1877-1996: A Critical Guide to 646 Movies. McFarland. ISBN 978-0-7864-0595-4.
- Liebman, Roy (2000). The Wampas Baby Stars: A Biographical Dictionary, 1922-1934. McFarland. ISBN 978-0-7864-0756-9.
- Lowe, Denise (2005). An Encyclopedic Dictionary of Women in Early American Films, 1895-1930. Psychology Press. ISBN 978-0-7890-1843-4.
- Springer, John; Hamilton, Jack D. (1974). They Had Faces Then: Super Stars, Stars, and Starlets of the 1930's. Castle. ISBN 978-0-89009-568-3.
- Vogel, Michelle (2010). Olive Borden: The Life and Films of Hollywood's "Joy Girl". McFarland. ISBN 978-0-7864-4795-4.
