= Playthings of Desire =

1924 film by Burton L. King

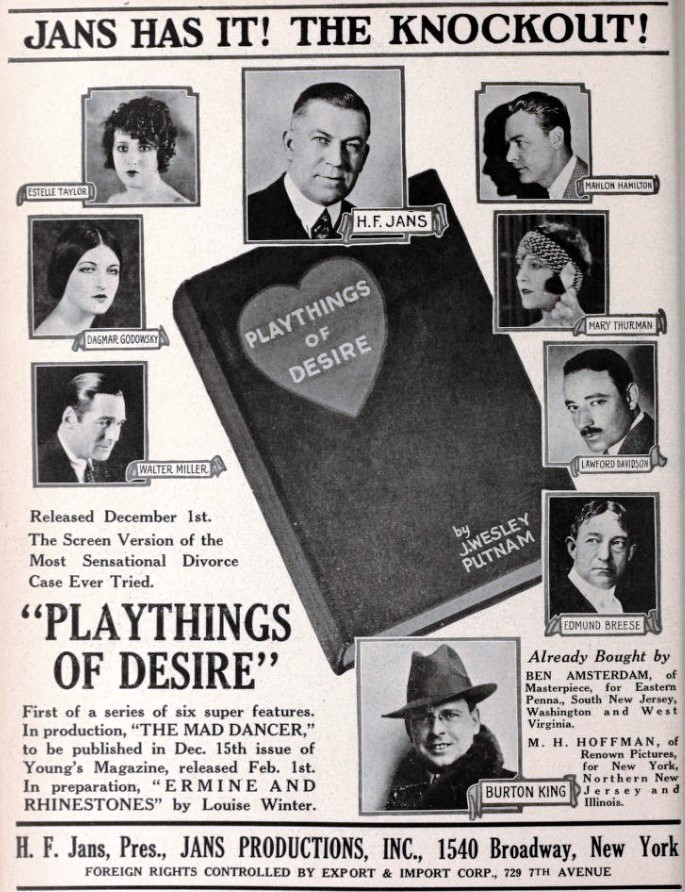
- Advertisement
- Directed by: Burton L. King
- Written by: William B. Laub (scenario)
- Story by: Harry Sinclair Drago
- Produced by: Burton L. King
- Starring: Estelle Taylor
- Distributed by: Jans; Renown Pictures
- Release date: December 15, 1924
- Running time: 7 reels
- Country: United States
- Language: Silent (English intertitles)

Playthings of Desire is a 1924 American silent melodrama film produced and directed by Burton L. King and starring Estelle Taylor.

== Cast ==
- Estelle Taylor as Gloria Dawn
- Mahlon Hamilton as Pierre du Charme
- Dagmar Godowsky as Renee Grant
- Mary Thurman as Anne Cabot
- Lawford Davidson as James Malvern
- Walter Miller as Brom Jones
- Edmund Breese as Gov. Cabbot
- Bradley Barker as Wheeler Johnson
- Ida Pardee as Gloria's Mother
- Lee Beggs as Caretaker

== Preservation ==
A print listed as being complete of Playthings of Desire is located in the Library of Congress.
