= Sailor's Holiday =

Sailor's Holiday refers to:

- Sailor's Holiday (1929 film)
- Sailor's Holiday (1944 film)
