= The Hot Heiress =

1931 film

- Lobby card
- Directed by: Clarence G. Badger
- Screenplay by: Herbert Fields
- Starring: Ben Lyon; Ona Munson; Walter Pidgeon; Tom Dugan; Holmes Herbert; Inez Courtney
- Cinematography: Sol Polito
- Edited by: Thomas Pratt
- Music by: Leon Rosebrook
- Production company: First National Pictures
- Distributed by: Warner Bros. Pictures
- Release date: March 28, 1931
- Running time: 79 minutes
- Country: United States
- Language: English

The Hot Heiress is a 1931 American pre-Code comedy film directed by Clarence G. Badger and written by Herbert Fields, with three songs by Richard Rodgers and Lorenz Hart. The film stars Ben Lyon, Ona Munson, Walter Pidgeon, Tom Dugan, Holmes Herbert and Inez Courtney. The film was released by Warner Bros. Pictures on March 28, 1931.

== Plot ==
Hap Harrigan is a construction worker who spots socialite Juliette through a window of the building next door and is instantly smitten. She falls for him as well and they begin a romance. But since her family wouldn't approve, she tells them he's actually an architect. Things get sticky when the man she broke up with plans to sabotage their impending engagement.

== Cast ==
- Ben Lyon as 'Hap' Harrigan
- Ona Munson as Juliette
- Walter Pidgeon as Clay
- Tom Dugan as Bill Dugan
- Holmes Herbert as Mr. Hunter
- Inez Courtney as Margie
- Thelma Todd as Lola
- Nella Walker as Mrs. Hunter

== Reception ==
Mordaunt Hall of The New York Times said, "Under the rather self-consciously moviesque title of The Hot Heiress, the team of Fields, Rodgers and Hart offer at the Strand a musical comedy romance of poverty and riches. The story is too fragile and stale even for the films, whatever Mr. Fields may have read about screen stories, but the comedy is bright and the tunes are in the gay and lilting Rodgers and Hart manner."

== Preservation status ==
- A copy resides in the Library of Congress collection. On April 4, 2018, Warner Archive released it as a Region 1 made-on-demand DVD. It also airs occasionally on Turner Classic Movies.
