= Whispering Sage =

1927 film

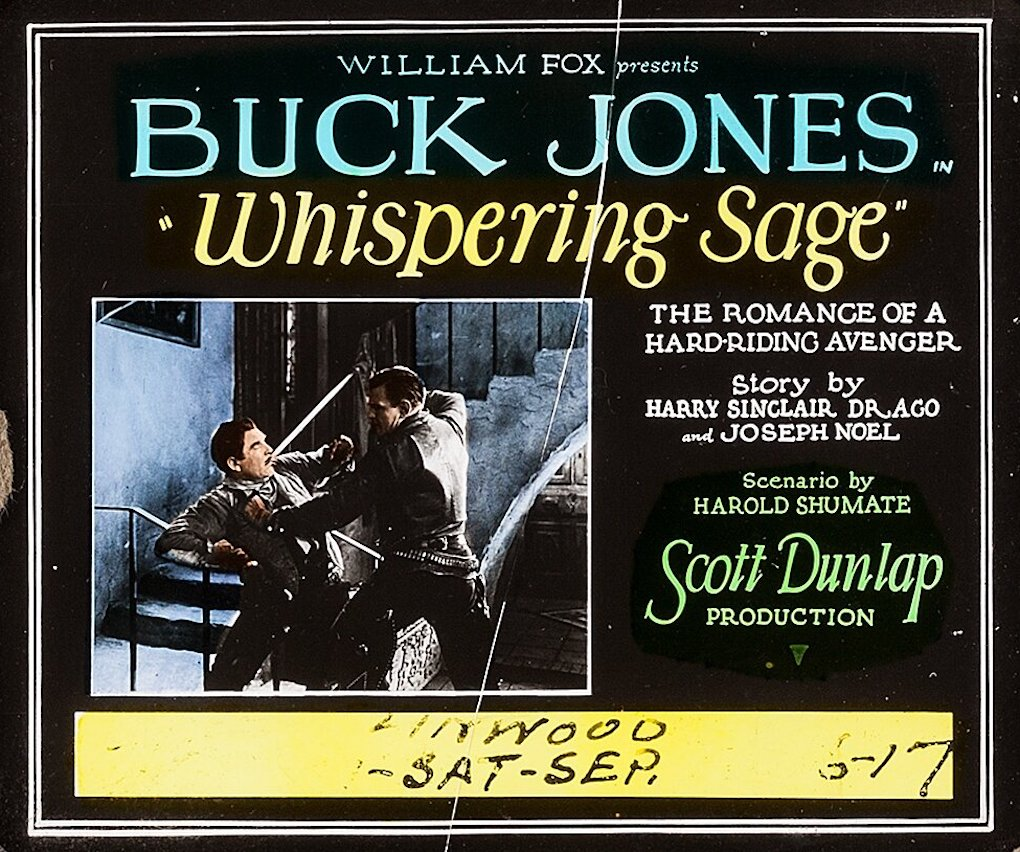
- Lantern slide
- Directed by: Scott R. Dunlap
- Screenplay by: Harold Shumate
- Based on: Whispering Sage by: Harry Sinclair Drago; Joseph Noel
- Starring: Buck Jones; Natalie Joyce; Émile Chautard; Carl Miller; Albert J. Smith; Joseph W. Girard
- Cinematography: Reginald Lyons
- Production company: Fox Film Corporation
- Distributed by: Fox Film Corporation
- Release date: March 20, 1927
- Running time: 50 minutes
- Country: United States
- Languages: Silent; English intertitles

Whispering Sage is a 1927 American silent Western film directed by Scott R. Dunlap and written by Harold Shumate. It is based on the 1922 novel Whispering Sage by Harry Sinclair Drago and Joseph Noel. The film stars Buck Jones, Natalie Joyce, Émile Chautard, Carl Miller, Albert J. Smith and Joseph W. Girard. The film was released on March 20, 1927, by Fox Film Corporation.

== Cast ==
- Buck Jones as Buck Kildare
- Natalie Joyce as Mercedes
- Émile Chautard as José Arastrade
- Carl Miller as Esteban Bengoa
- Albert J. Smith as Ed Fallows
- Joseph W. Girard as Hugh Acklin
- William Steele as Tom Kildare
- Ellen Winston as Mrs. Kildare
- Hazel Keener as Mercedes' Friend
- Enrique Acosta as Old Pedro
