= Through the Breakers =

1928 film

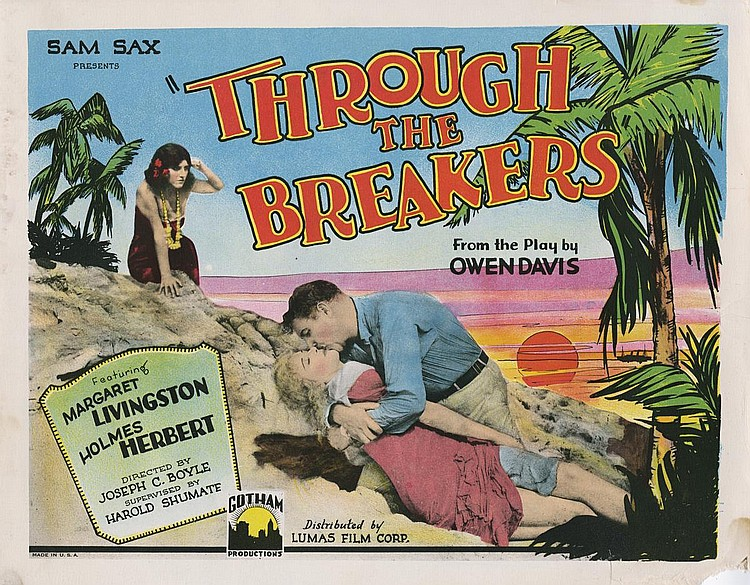
- Directed by: Joseph C. Boyle
- Written by: Owen Davis (play); Harold Shumate; John Steele
- Produced by: Harold Shumate
- Starring: Margaret Livingston; Holmes Herbert; Clyde Cook
- Cinematography: Ray June
- Edited by: Ray Snyder
- Production company: Gotham Productions
- Distributed by: Lumas Film Corporation
- Release date: September 28, 1928
- Running time: 55 minutes
- Country: United States
- Languages: Silent; English intertitles

Through the Breakers is a 1928 American drama film directed by Joseph C. Boyle and starring Margaret Livingston, Holmes Herbert and Clyde Cook.

== Cast ==
- Margaret Livingston as Diane Garrett
- Holmes Herbert as Eustis Hobbs
- Clyde Cook as John Lancaster
- Natalie Joyce as Taya
- Frank Hagney as Gamboa

== Bibliography ==
- Steven Stack & Barbara Bowman. Suicide Movies: Social Patterns 1900-2009. Hogrefe Publishing, 2011.
