= The Circus Ace =

1927 film

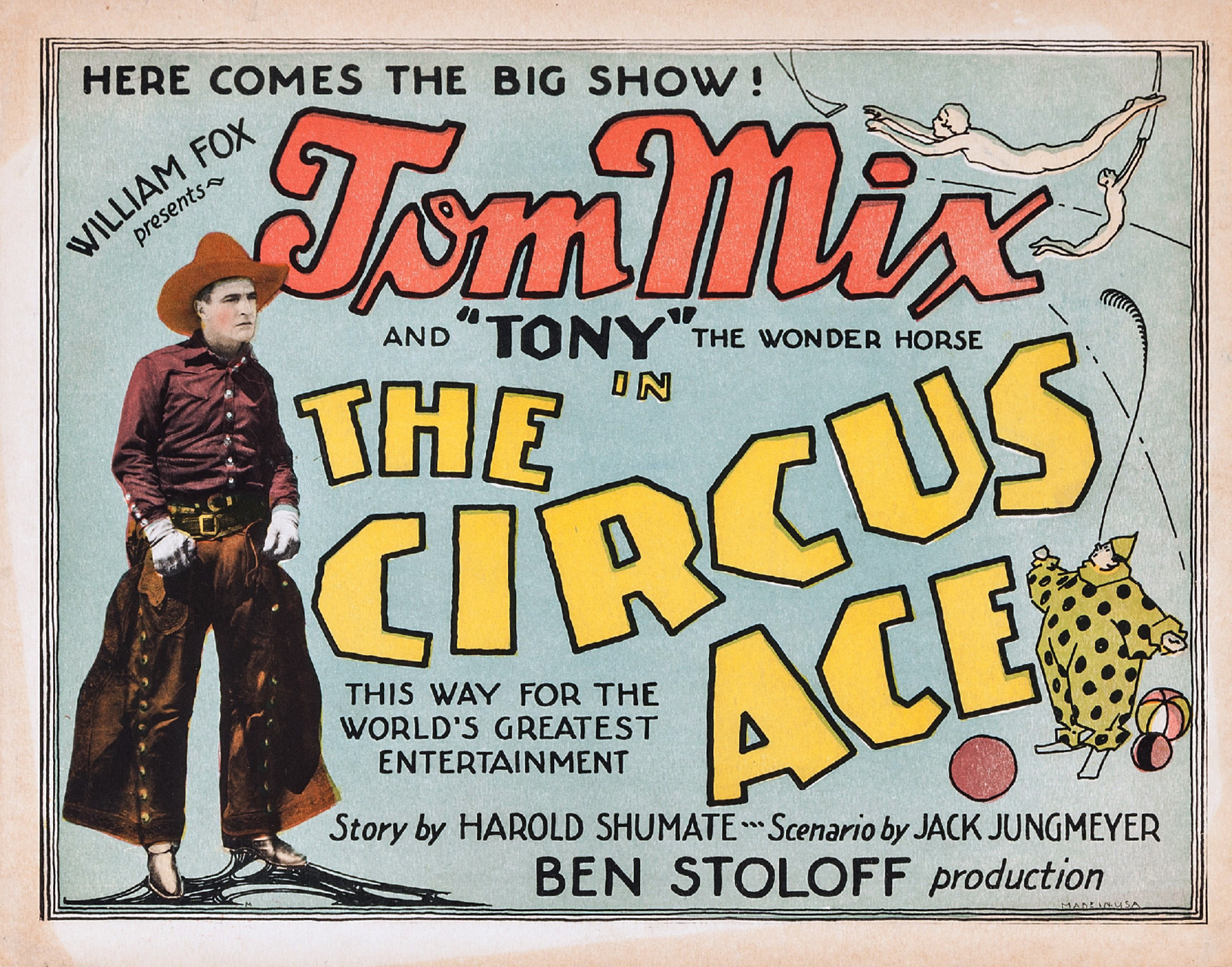
- Lobby card
- Directed by: Benjamin Stoloff
- Screenplay by: Jack Jungmeyer
- Story by: Harold Shumate
- Starring: Tom Mix; Natalie Joyce; Jack Baston; Duke R. Lee; James Bradbury Sr. Stanley Blystone
- Cinematography: Daniel B. Clark
- Production company: Fox Film Corporation
- Distributed by: Fox Film Corporation
- Release date: June 26, 1927
- Running time: 50 minutes
- Country: United States
- Languages: Silent; English intertitles

The Circus Ace is a 1927 American silent Western film directed by Benjamin Stoloff and written by Jack Jungmeyer. The film stars Tom Mix, Natalie Joyce, Jack Baston, Duke R. Lee, James Bradbury Sr., and Stanley Blystone. The film was released on June 26, 1927, by Fox Film Corporation. The film survives complete at the Czech Film Archive.

== Cast ==
- Tom Mix as Tom Terry
- Natalie Joyce as Millie Jane
- Jack Baston as Kirk Mallory
- Duke R. Lee as Job Jasper
- James Bradbury Sr. as Gus Peabody
- Stanley Blystone as Boss Convas Man
- Dudley Smith as Durgan the Miller
- Buster Gardner as The Sheriff

== See also ==
- Tom Mix filmography
