= The Great Well =

1924 film by Henry Kolker

- Directed by: Henry Kolker
- Written by: Alfred Sutro; Louis Stevens
- Starring: Thurston Hall; Seena Owen; Lawford Davidson; Joan Morgan
- Production company: Ideal Film Company
- Distributed by: Ideal Film Company
- Release date: 1924
- Running time: 60 minutes
- Country: United Kingdom
- Language: English

The Great Well is a 1924 British silent drama film directed by Henry Kolker and starring Thurston Hall, Seena Owen and Lawford Davidson. It was based on the 1923 play The Great Well by Alfred Sutro.

== Cast ==
- Thurston Hall - Peter Starling
- Seena Owen - Camilla Challenor
- Lawford Davidson - Major Dereth
- Joan Morgan - Annette
- Eva Moore - Mrs. Starling
- Cameron Carr - John
- Harvey Braban - Eric
- Simeon Stuart - Sir Wilmot
- Hugh Dempster - Dick
