= Cock o' the Walk (1930 film) =

1930 film

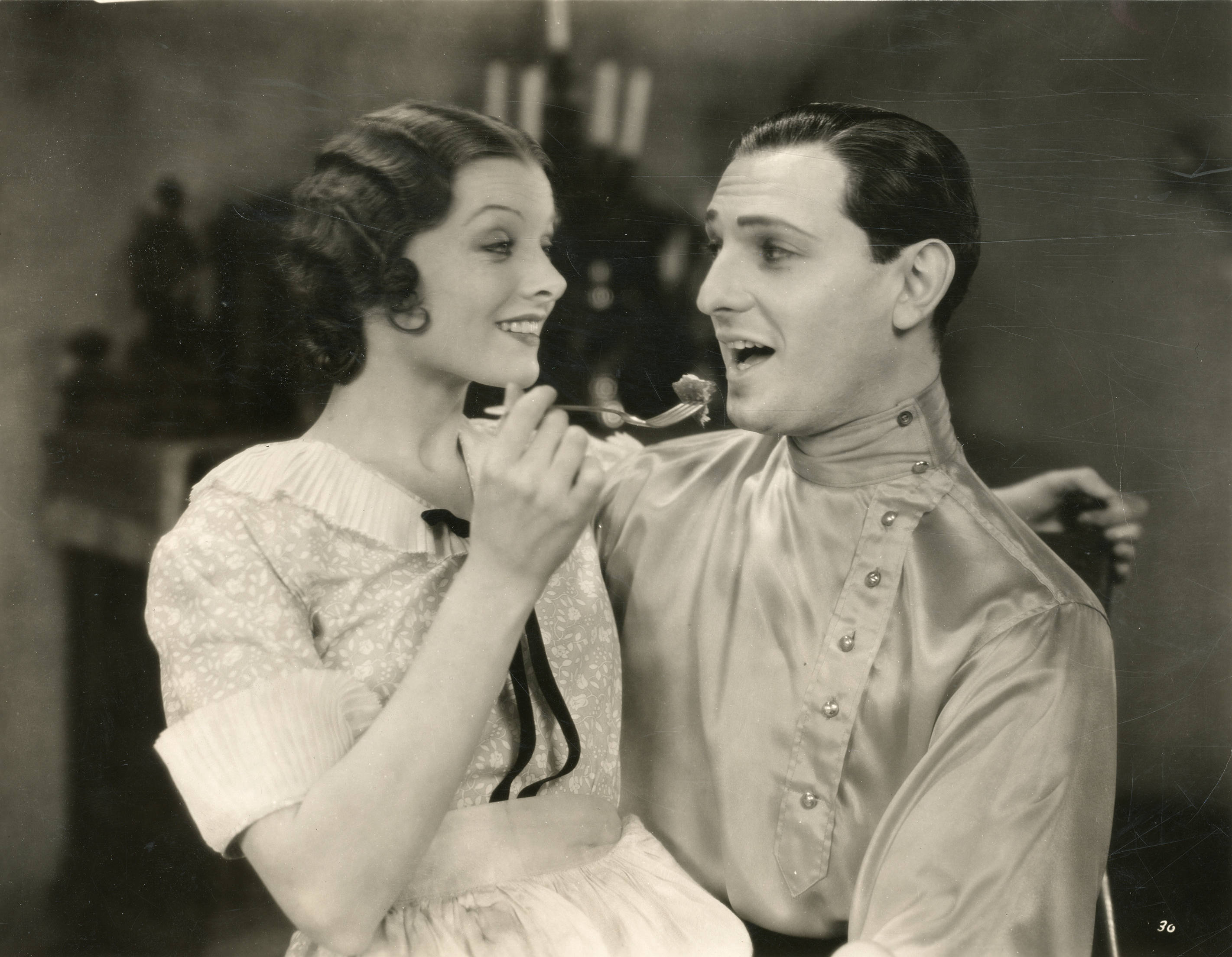
- Film still
- Directed by: Walter Lang; Roy William Neill
- Written by: Arturo S. Mom; Frances Guihan; Nagene Searle
- Starring: Joseph Schildkraut
- Distributed by: Sono-Art World Wide Pictures
- Release date: April 15, 1930
- Running time: 50 minutes
- Country: United States
- Language: English

Cock o' the Walk is a 1930 American pre-Code drama film directed by Walter Lang. The film is now considered to be lost.

== Plot ==
Carlos Lopez is an aspiring violinist in Buenos Aires, who pursues and is pursued by many married women. He ends up making enemies of married men in the city.

== Cast ==
- Joseph Schildkraut as Carlos Lopez
- Myrna Loy as Narita
- Philip Sleeman as José
- Edward Peil Sr. as Ortega (credited as Edward Peil)
- John Beck as Cafe Manager
- Olive Tell as Rosa Vallejo
- Wilfred Lucas as Señor Vallejo
- Frank Jonasson as Pedro
- Sally Long as Paulina Castra
- Natalie Joyce as Maria
