= The Man from Nevada (1929 film) =

1929 film directed by J.P. McGowan

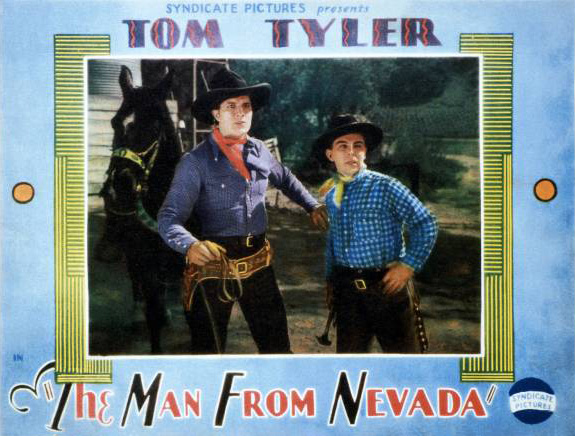
- Directed by: J.P. McGowan
- Written by: Sally Winters
- Produced by: J.P. McGowan
- Starring: Tom Tyler; Natalie Joyce; Al Ferguson
- Cinematography: Hap Depew
- Production company: J.P. McGowan Productions
- Distributed by: Syndicate Pictures
- Release date: August 1929
- Running time: 55 minutes
- Country: United States
- Languages: Silent; English intertitles

The Man from Nevada is a 1929 American silent Western film directed by J.P. McGowan and starring Tom Tyler, Natalie Joyce and Al Ferguson.

== Cast ==
- Tom Tyler as Jack Carter
- Natalie Joyce as Virginia Watkins
- Al Ferguson as Luke Baldridge
- Alfred Hewston as Jim Watkins
- Kip Cooper as 'Wart' Watkins
- Godfrey Craig as 'Wiggles' Watkins
- Frank Hall Crane as 'Wobbles' Watkins
- William L. Nolte as 'Bowery' Walker
