= Ona Munson =

American actress (1903–1955)

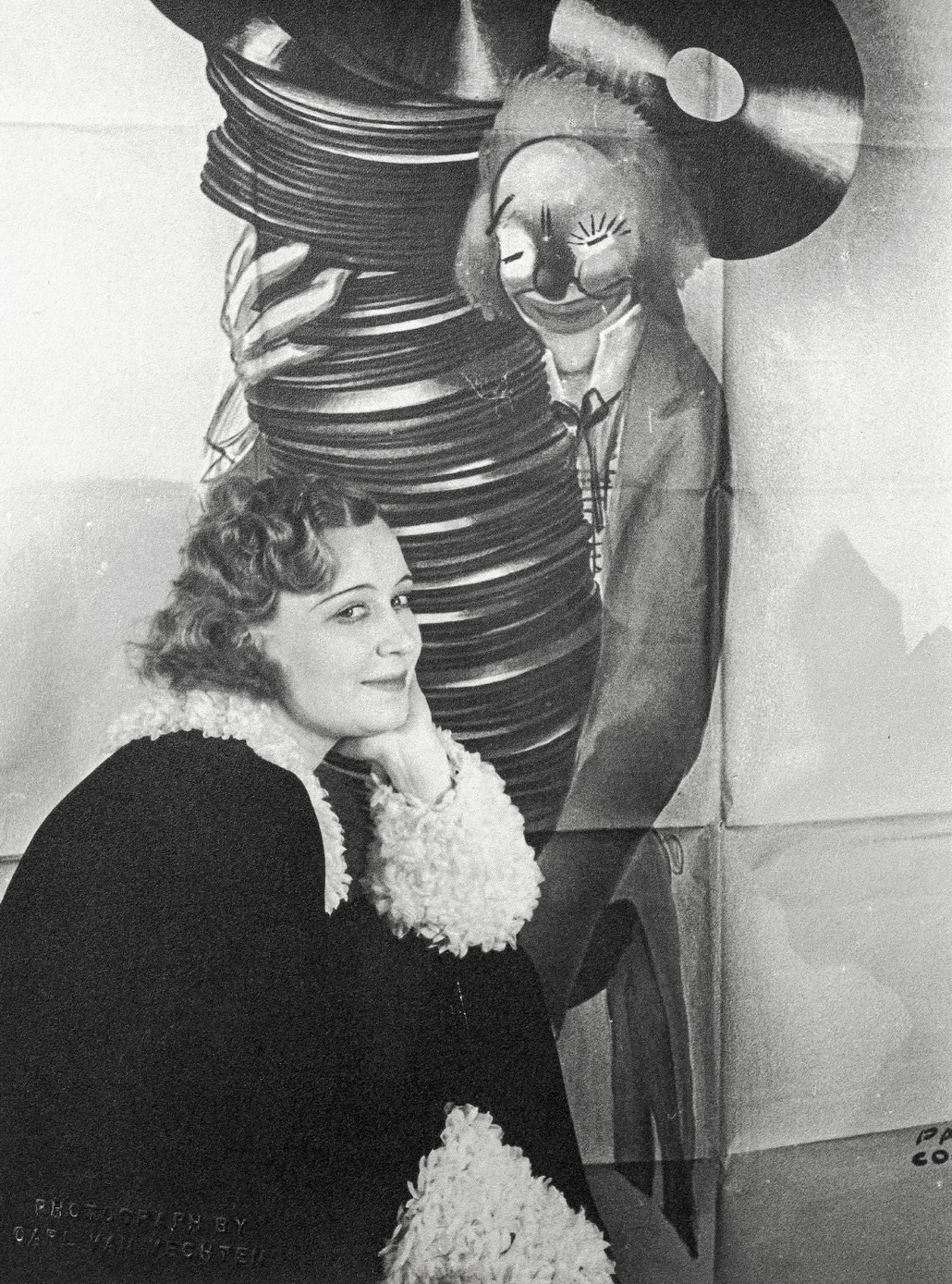
- Munson in 1932 by Carl Van Vechten
- Born: Owena Elizabeth Wolcott; June 16, 1903; Albany, Oregon, U.S.
- Died: February 11, 1955 (aged 51); New York City, New York, U.S.
- Resting place: Ferncliff Cemetery
- Occupation: Actress
- Years active: 1919–1953
- Spouses: Edward Buzzell (m. 1926; div. 1931) Eugene Berman (m. 1950)

Ona Munson (born Owena Elizabeth Wolcott; June 16, 1903 – February 11, 1955) was an American film, stage, and radio actress. She starred in nine Broadway productions and 20 feature films in her career, which spanned over 30 years.

Raised in Portland, Oregon, Munson performed in local theatrical productions before beginning a stage career in New York theater in 1919, debuting on Broadway in George White's Scandals. She starred in another four Broadway plays and musicals before the end of the 1920s. In 1930, she moved to Los Angeles to embark on a career in film, but after appearing as leads in several films, such as Going Wild (1930) and The Hot Heiress (1931), she returned to Broadway, starring in several productions, including Henrik Ibsen's Ghosts (1935).

Munson resumed her film career in the late 1930s, and was cast as madam Belle Watling in David O. Selznick's Gone with the Wind (1939), a role which became her most famous. She starred in numerous films for Warner Bros. in the 1940s, often typecast based on her performance in Gone with the Wind, for instance in von Sternberg’s The Shanghai Gesture (1941).

Munson married painter Eugene Berman in 1950, her second husband after a five-year marriage to director Edward Buzzell. She also had several documented affairs with women, including Alla Nazimova and playwright Mercedes de Acosta. Some commentators have considered her marriages as "lavender marriages", concealing Munson's bisexuality. By the mid-1950s, Munson was suffering from health complications following an unspecified surgical procedure, and frequently using barbiturates. In February 1955, Berman found Munson dead in their Manhattan apartment, having taken her own life via a barbiturate overdose.

== Early life ==
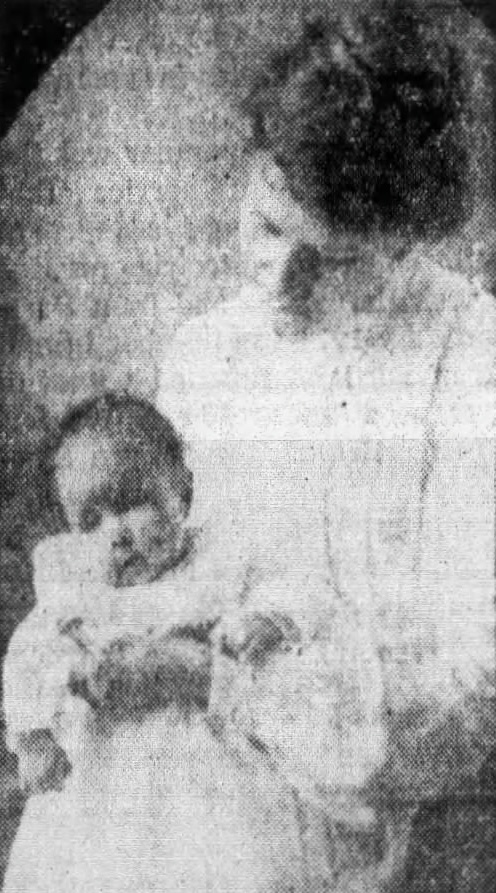
Munson with her mother, c. 1903

Munson was born Owena Elizabeth Wolcott on June 16, 1903 in Albany, Oregon, (Note: Some newspaper sources at the time of Munson's death claimed she was 48, indicating a birth date of June 16 or September 17, 1906. However, biographer Axel Nissen notes in his book, Accustomed to Her Face: Thirty-Five Character Actresses of Golden Age Hollywood—citing census records—that Munson was born in fact born June 16, 1903. Munson's 1923 U.S. passport application lists her date of birth as June 16, 1903. Additionally, numerous sources erroneously state Munson was born in Portland, Oregon, though Nissen cites passenger list records from 1936 indicating she was in fact born in Albany, Oregon. Munson gave Albany as her birthplace on numerous other occasions, and it was published in local newspapers prior to her fame.) the last of four children born to Sally (née Gore) and Owen Parrett Wolcott. She was named after her father. All three of her elder siblings had died in infancy, leaving Munson the first surviving and only child. Munson was of French-Canadian heritage; her paternal grandmother immigrated from Quebec in 1865.

When Munson was two years old, her family relocated from Albany to Portland, where she was raised in the city's southeast section. Her father worked as a real estate agent, while her mother was employed as a milliner. She began taking dancing lessons at age four, and was later tutored in French as well as taking swimming and horseback riding lessons. She attended the Catlin Gabel School (then known as Miss Catlin's School), where she developed an affinity for English literature. She also performed as an actress and dancer in local theatrical productions in Portland throughout her late childhood and early teenage years.

Around 1917, at age fourteen, Munson relocated with her mother to New York City to pursue a stage acting career. In 1920, she was residing with her mother in a hotel on the Upper West Side, while training in Russian ballet for approximately one year. Her parents divorced in the 1920s, and her father later remarried.

== Career ==
=== 1919–1929: Stage beginnings and Broadway ===
Munson first appeared on Broadway in a minor role in George White's Scandals, followed by a supporting part in Twinkle, Twinkle (both staged in 1919). In 1922, vaudevillian Gus Edwards recruited Munson to perform in one of his shows, The Song Revue, which was staged for 52 weeks on the Orpheum tour circuit throughout the United States. After completing the tour, Munson and her mother traveled to Europe where Munson continued her education.

In 1925, Munson was cast in the title role of the singing and dancing ingenue Nanette in No, No, Nanette, which ran for 27 weeks at the Garrick Theatre in Philadelphia. The following year, she reprised the role in the original Broadway production, replacing Louise Groody. In 1927, she portrayed the title character in Manhattan Mary, followed by the female lead in 1928's original production of Hold Everything!, a musical in which she introduced the song "You're the Cream in My Coffee".

=== 1930–1940: Move to Hollywood ===
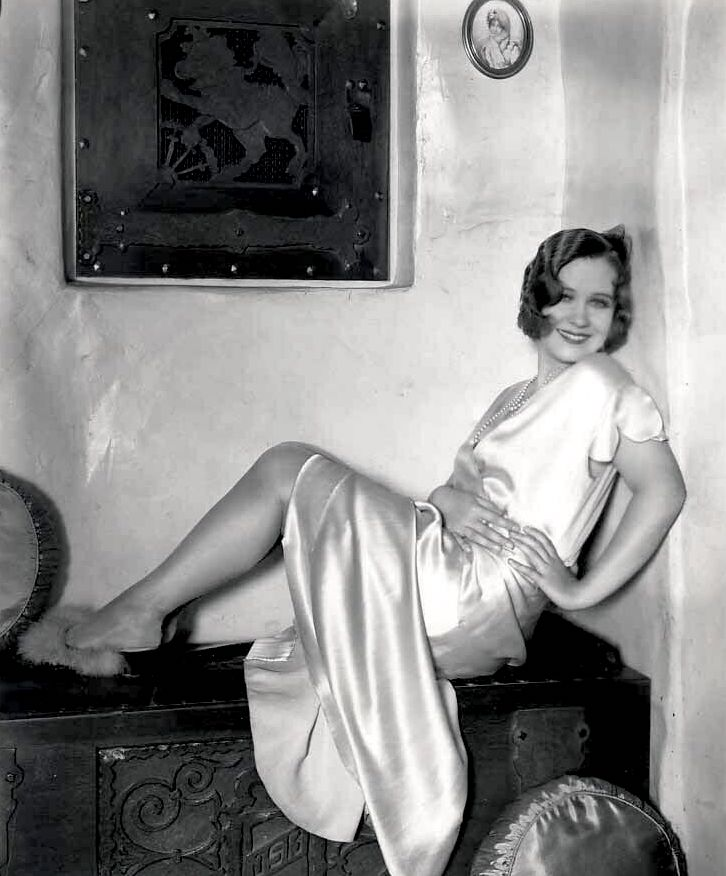
Munson in Going Wild (1930)

Munson moved to Los Angeles in 1930, and appeared in the Warner Bros. movie Going Wild. Originally, this film was intended as a musical, but all the numbers were removed before release owing to the public's distaste for musicals, which virtually saturated the cinema in 1929–30. The following year, she divorced Buzzell. After the divorce, Munson had a brief affair with filmmaker Ernst Lubitsch before his marriage to Vivian Gaye.

Munson appeared the next year in The Hot Heiress, in which she sings several songs along with her co-star Ben Lyon. She also starred in Broadminded (1931) and Five Star Final (1931). After completing these films, Munson returned to New York and resumed her theater career, starring in Broadway productions of Hold Your Horses (1933), followed by Petticoat Fever and Henrik Ibsen's Ghosts (both staged in 1935), in the latter of which she portrayed Regina Engstrand. During rehearsals for Ghosts, Munson had a short-lived romantic affair with actress Alla Nazimova, which ended before the play's premiere. Co-star Harry Ellerbe stated that the couple had "parted amicably."

Around 1933, Munson began regularly performing in radio dramas, averaging twelve programs per week, including Rich Man's Darling, David Harum, Cavalcade of America, The March of Time, and Manhattan Merry-Go-Round. Commenting on her radio career, Munson said: "I like the medium very much and realized its possibilities so I began to add other programs in which I could play characters."

==== Gone With the Wind ====
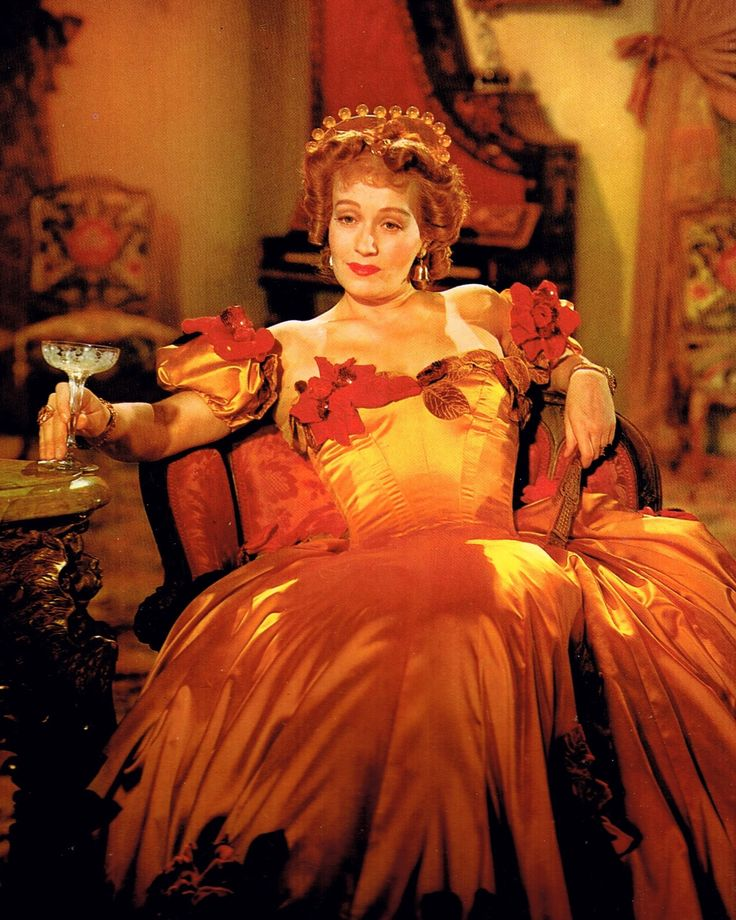
Munson as Belle Watling in Gone With the Wind (1939)

Munson returned to Los Angeles in 1938 to appear a minor part in His Exciting Night, followed by an uncredited role in Dramatic School. When David O. Selznick began casting his production Gone with the Wind, he first announced that Mae West was to play Belle, but both West and Tallulah Bankhead refused the role as too small. Munson was the antithesis of the voluptuous Belle: freckled and of slight build—but Selznick cast her in the role.

Munson had no apprehensions in accepting the role, as she said was the case of many an actress confronted with an objectionable character. Upon learning she had the role, "I was delighted. So many wanted it, I had no idea the directors would give it to me."

"The most difficult part of [the] role is acting between the lines. 'Belle' had so many things to say that could not be said, it was necessary to enact them. That took patience and hard work. I hope I have been able to do what they would not let me say."

Munson’s career was stalemated by the acclaim of Gone with the Wind; for the remainder of her career, she was typecast in similar roles. In 1940, Munson had an affair with playwright Mercedes de Acosta while working for Republic Pictures in Los Angeles. Their affair was intense, with Munson once writing to Acosta in a letter: "I long to hold you in my arms and pour my love into you."

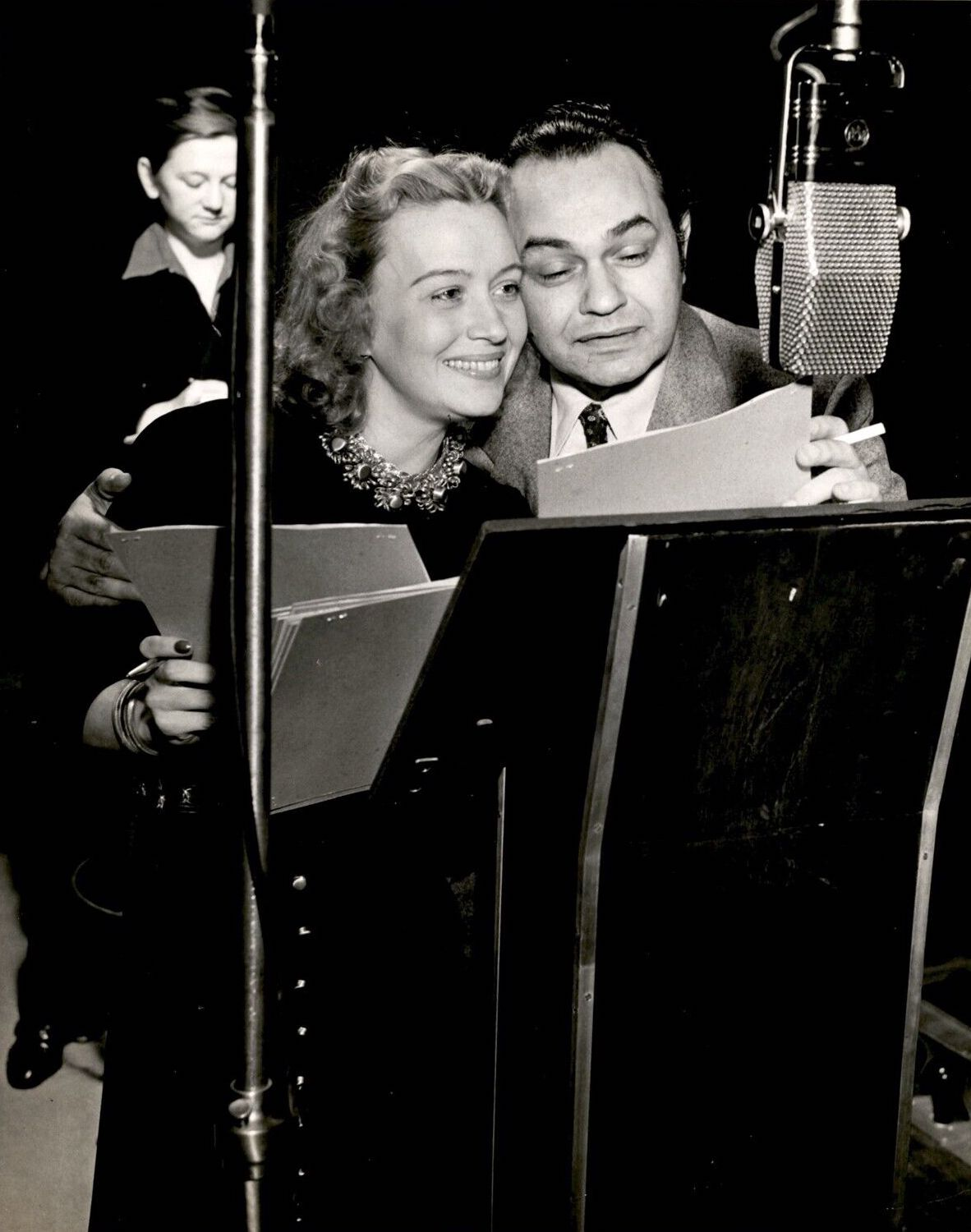
Munson with Edward G. Robinson performing on Big Town, 1941

Munson's returned to radio performing as Lorelei opposite Edward G. Robinson on Big Town in 1941.

=== 1941–1955: Later years ===
In 1941, Munson portrayed a Chinese casino owner of dubious repute, Mother Gin Sling, in Josef von Sternberg's film The Shanghai Gesture (1941), in which she was "unrecognizable" due to the ‘yellowface’ make-up created for her character and others for the film. Bosley Crowther of The New York Times wrote in his review of the film that Munson "looks like an alabaster statue and acts like a gunman's moll."

Her final feature film appearance was The Red House (1947), a psychological horror film in which she co-starred with Edward G. Robinson, Rory Calhoun, and Julie London. By 1949, Munson semi-retired from acting.

== Personal life ==
On July 16, 1926, Munson married actor Edward Buzzell in New York City. The marriage lasted six years before their divorce in 1931. During production of The Shanghai Gesture (1941), it was publicized that Munson had planned to marry Federal Housing agent Stewart McDonald. Though the couple ultimately did not marry, they remained romantically involved through 1942. She later married painter Eugene Berman on January 20, 1950 in Beverly Hills.

Historians Billy Harbin and Kim Marra have termed Munson's marriages as "lavender marriages" intended to conceal her bisexuality and affairs with women.

Munson has been listed as a member of a group termed the "sewing circle", a clique of lesbians organized by actress Alla Nazimova, who was one of Munson's lovers.

== Death ==
Plagued by ill health stemming from an unnamed surgical procedure, Munson died by suicide at the age of 51 with an overdose of barbiturates in her apartment in The Belnord on Manhattan's Upper West Side. Her body was discovered by her husband Berman on the afternoon of February 11, 1955. A note found next to her bed read: "This is the only way I know to be free again... Please don't follow me." An autopsy determined that Munson had ingested the barbiturates between 4:00 a.m. and 6:00 a.m. on February 11.

She was interred at Ferncliff Cemetery in Hartsdale, New York. Munson posthumously received a star on the Hollywood Walk of Fame, located on the north side of the 6200 block of Hollywood Boulevard.

== Filmography ==
Year	Title	Role	Notes	Ref.
1928	The Head of the Family		Uncredited	
1930	Going Wild	Ruth Howard		
1931	The Hot Heiress	Juliette		
1931	Broadminded	Constance Palmer		
1931	Five Star Final	Kitty Carmody		
1938	His Exciting Night	Anne Baker		
1938	Dramatic School	Student	Uncredited	
1939	Scandal Sheet	Kitty Mulhane		
1939	Legion of Lost Flyers	Martha Wilson		
1939	Gone with the Wind	Belle Watling		
1939	The Big Guy	Mary Whitlock		
1940	Wagons Westward	Julie O'Conover		
1941	Lady from Louisiana	Julie Mirbeau		
1941	Wild Geese Calling	Clarabella		
1941	The Shanghai Gesture	'Mother' Gin Sling		
1942	Drums of the Congo	Dr. Ann Montgomery		
1943	Idaho	Belle Bonner		
1945	The Cheaters	Florie Watson		
1945	Dakota	Jersey Thomas		
1947	The Red House	Mrs. Storm		

== Stage credits ==
Year	Title	Role	Notes	Ref.
1919	George White's Scandals	Another Soubrette	Liberty Theatre	
1919	Twinkle, Twinkle	Alice James	Liberty Theatre	
1925	No, No, Nanette	Nanette	Garrick Theatre	
1926	No, No, Nanette	Nanette	Globe Theatre	
1927	Manhattan Mary	Mary Brennan	Apollo Theatre	
1928	Hold Everything!	Sue Burke	Broadhurst Theatre	
1933	Hold Your Horses	Marjory Ellis	Winter Garden Theatre	
1935	Petticoat Fever	Clara Wilson	Ritz Theatre	
1935	Ghosts	Regina Engstrand	Empire Theatre	
1952	First Lady	Sophy Prescott	City Center Theatre	

== Sources ==
- Harbin, Billy J.; Marra, Kim; Schanke, Robert A. (2005). The Gay & Lesbian Theatrical Legacy: A Biographical Dictionary of Major Figures in American Stage History in the Pre-Stonewall Era. Ann Arbor, Michigan: University of Michigan Press. ISBN 0-472-09858-6.
- Jewell, Richard B. (2012). RKO Radio Pictures: A Titan Is Born. Berkeley, California: University of California Press. ISBN 978-0-520-27178-4.
- Madsen, Axel (1995). The Sewing Circle: Hollywood's Greatest Secret: Female Stars Who Loved Other Women. New York City, New York: Birch Lane Press. ISBN 978-1-559-72275-9.
- Nissen, Axel (2016). Accustomed to Her Face: Thirty-Five Character Actresses of Golden Age Hollywood. Jefferson, North Carolina: McFarland & Company. ISBN 978-1-476-62606-2.
- Wollstein, Hans J. (2024). Vixens, Floozies and Molls: 28 Actresses of Late 1920s and 1930s Hollywood. Jefferson, North Carolina: McFarland & Company. ISBN 978-1-476-61181-5.
