= The Little Door Into the World =

1923 film

- Directed by: George Dewhurst
- Written by: George Dewhurst
- Produced by: George Dewhurst
- Starring: Lawford Davidson; Nancy Beard; Olaf Hytten
- Production company: Dewhurst-Thompson
- Distributed by: Astra-National
- Release date: August 1923
- Country: United Kingdom
- Languages: Silent; English intertitles

The Little Door Into the World is a 1923 British silent drama film directed by George Dewhurst and starring Lawford Davidson, Nancy Beard and Olaf Hytten.

== Cast ==
- Lawford Davidson as Lefarge
- Nancy Beard as Maria Jose / Celestine
- Olaf Hytten as Mountebank
- Peggy Patterson as Dancer
- Victor Tandy as Agent
- Arthur Mayhew as Troubador
- Bob Williamson as Manager

== Bibliography ==
- Ann C. Paietta. Saints, Clergy and Other Religious Figures on Film and Television, 1895–2003. McFarland, 2005.
