= Wildfire (1925 film) =

1925 film

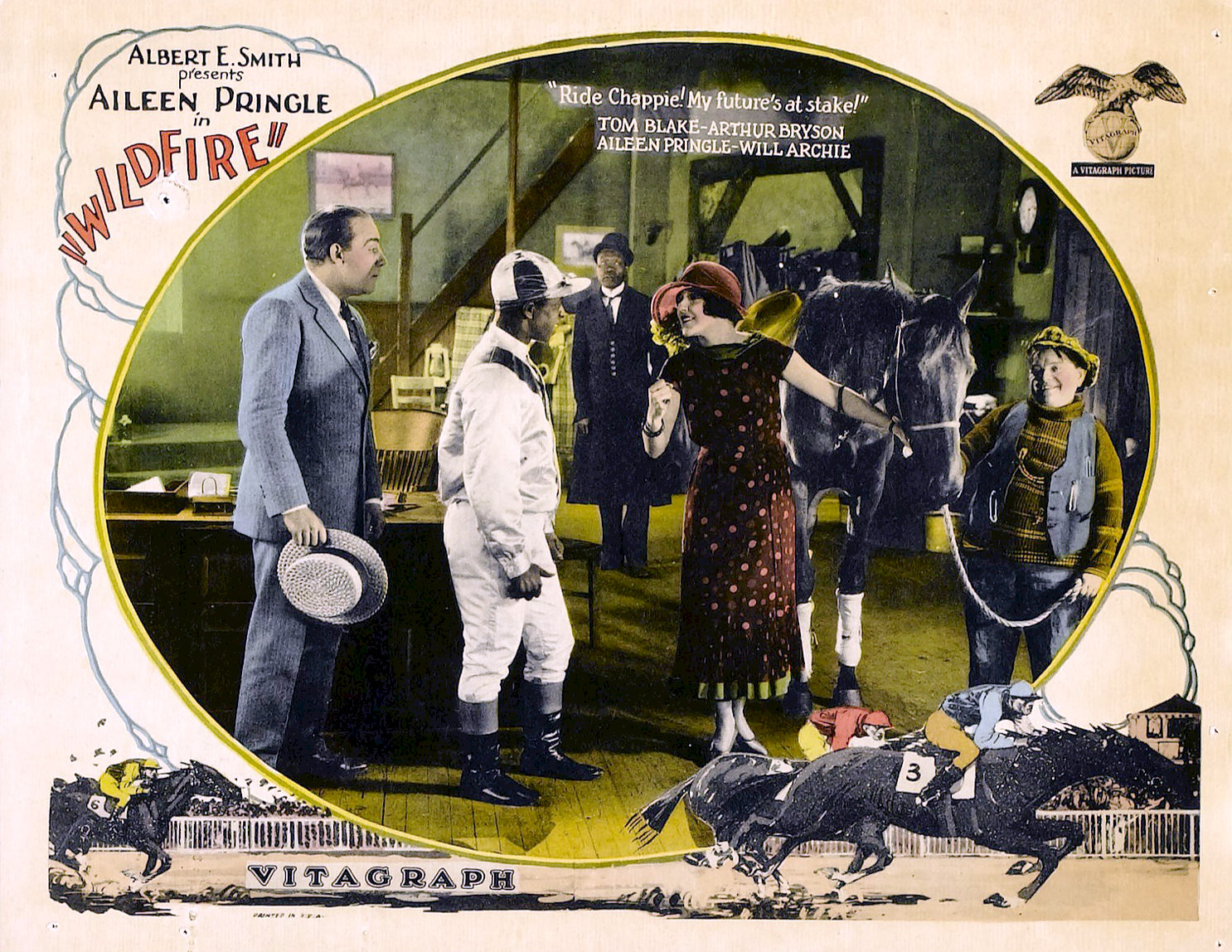
- Lobby card
- Directed by: T. Hayes Hunter
- Based on: Wildfire by George Broadhurst and George V. Hobart
- Starring: Aileen Pringle
- Cinematography: J. Roy Hunt
- Production company: Distinctive Productions
- Distributed by: Vitagraph Company of America (through Warner Bros.)
- Release date: June 7, 1925
- Running time: 7 reels
- Country: United States
- Language: Silent (English intertitles)

Wildfire is a 1925 American silent drama film directed by T. Hayes Hunter. It was produced by Distinctive Productions, a company founded by George Arliss, and distributed by the Vitagraph Company of America. The film stars Aileen Pringle.

The film is based on the successful 1908 play Wildfire that had starred Lillian Russell on Broadway and a young actor just starting out named Irving Cummings, later a silent director. The story had been filmed before in 1915 with Lillian Russell herself and Lionel Barrymore.

== Plot ==
As described in a film magazine review, Claire Barrington falls heir to a famous racing stable with many debts, whose payment is dependent upon the sweepstakes in which the horse Wildfire is entered. John Duffy, her principal creditor, plots to throw the race to another horse, but Claire learns of the signal that would be used to alert the jockey and uses this to ensure Wildfire is triumphant. A charge of treachery made against John's enemy Garrison is proved false and Claire and Garrison become engaged.

== Cast ==
- Aileen Pringle as Claire Barrington
- Edna Murphy as Myrtl Barrington
- Holmes Herbert as Garrison
- Edmund Breese as Sen. Woodhurst
- Antrim Short as Ralph Woodhurst
- Tom Blake as Matt Donovan
- Lawford Davidson as John Duffy
- Arthur Bryson as Chappie Raster
- Will Archie as Bud
- Edna Morton as Hortense
- Robert Billoupe as Valet
- Vester Pegg (uncredited)

== Preservation status ==
This film survives in the Library of Congress collection and at the UCLA Film & Television Archive.
