= Wagons Westward =

1940 film by Lew Landers

- Theatrical release poster
- Directed by: Lew Landers
- Screenplay by: Joseph Moncure March; Harrison Jacobs
- Produced by: Armand Schaefer
- Starring: Chester Morris; Anita Louise; Buck Jones; Ona Munson; George "Gabby" Hayes; Guinn "Big Boy" Williams
- Cinematography: Ernest Miller
- Edited by: Ernest J. Nims; Murray Seldeen
- Music by: William Lava
- Production company: Republic Pictures
- Distributed by: Republic Pictures
- Release date: June 19, 1940
- Running time: 69 minutes
- Country: United States
- Language: English

Wagons Westward is a 1940 American Western film directed by Lew Landers, written by Joseph Moncure March and Harrison Jacobs and starring Chester Morris, Anita Louise, Buck Jones, Ona Munson, George "Gabby" Hayes and Guinn "Big Boy" Williams. It was released on June 19, 1940 by Republic Pictures.

== Plot ==
Twin brothers David and Tom Cook go their separate ways, David as a lawman, Tom as an outlaw. Tom is in league with corrupt sheriff Jim McDaniels and at odds with two members of his gang, Hardman and Marsden. The honest, upright David has few allies except for an elderly uncle, Hardtack.

Saloon singer Phyllis O'Conover is in love with Tom even though he has gone bad. Because of a case of mistaken identities, she marries his twin. Tom considers this unforgivable, even though Phyllis was sincerely in love with him, and kills her. David falls in love with Phyllis's jealous older sister Julie.

A showdown occurs between the twins. Tom has the drop on David and appears to be the victor until he is shot dead by their uncle.

== Cast ==
- Chester Morris as David Cook / Tom Cook
- Anita Louise as Phyllis O'Conover
- Buck Jones as Sheriff Jim McDaniels
- Ona Munson as Julie O'Conover
- George "Gabby" Hayes as Hardtack
- Guinn "Big Boy" Williams as Jake Hardman
- Douglas Fowley as Bill Marsden
- John Gallaudet as Blackie
- Virginia Brissac as Angela Cook
- Trevor Bardette as Alan Cook
- Selmer Jackson as Major Marlowe
- Charles Stevens as Pima
- Warren Hull as Young Tom Cook
- Wayne Hull as Young David Cook
- Max Waizmann as Storekeeper
