= His Exciting Night =

Film directed by Gus Meins

- Theatrical release poster
- Directed by: Gus Meins
- Screenplay by: Pat C. Flick; Edward Eliscu; Morton Grant
- Based on: Adam's Evening by Katharine Kavanaugh
- Produced by: Ken Goldsmith
- Starring: Charlie Ruggles; Richard Lane; Maxie Rosenbloom; Marion Martin; Stepin Fetchit; Ona Munson
- Cinematography: Henry Sharp
- Edited by: Philip Cahn
- Production company: Universal Pictures
- Distributed by: Universal Pictures
- Release date: November 11, 1938
- Running time: 61 minutes
- Country: United States
- Language: English
- Budget: $91,000

His Exciting Night is a 1938 American comedy film directed by Gus Meins and written by Pat C. Flick, Edward Eliscu and Morton Grant. It is based on the 1934 play Adam's Evening by Katharine Kavanaugh. The film stars Charlie Ruggles, Richard Lane, Maxie Rosenbloom, Marion Martin, Stepin Fetchit and Ona Munson. The film was released on November 11, 1938, by Universal Pictures.

== Plot ==
On his wedding-eve night Adam Tripp becomes the victim of several practical jokes and almost loses his future bride.

== Cast ==
- Charlie Ruggles as Adam Tripp
- Richard Lane as Homer Carslake
- Maxie Rosenbloom as 'Doc' McCoy
- Marion Martin as Gypsy McCoy
- Stepin Fetchit as Casper
- Ona Munson as Anne Baker
- Raymond Parker as Bob
- Frances Robinson as Margie Baker
- Georgia Caine as Aunt Elizabeth Baker
- Regis Toomey as Bill Stewart
- Mark Daniels as McGill
- Benny Baker as Taxi Driver
- Mary Field as Carslake's Secretary (uncredited)
