= Olaf Hytten =

Scottish actor (1888–1955)

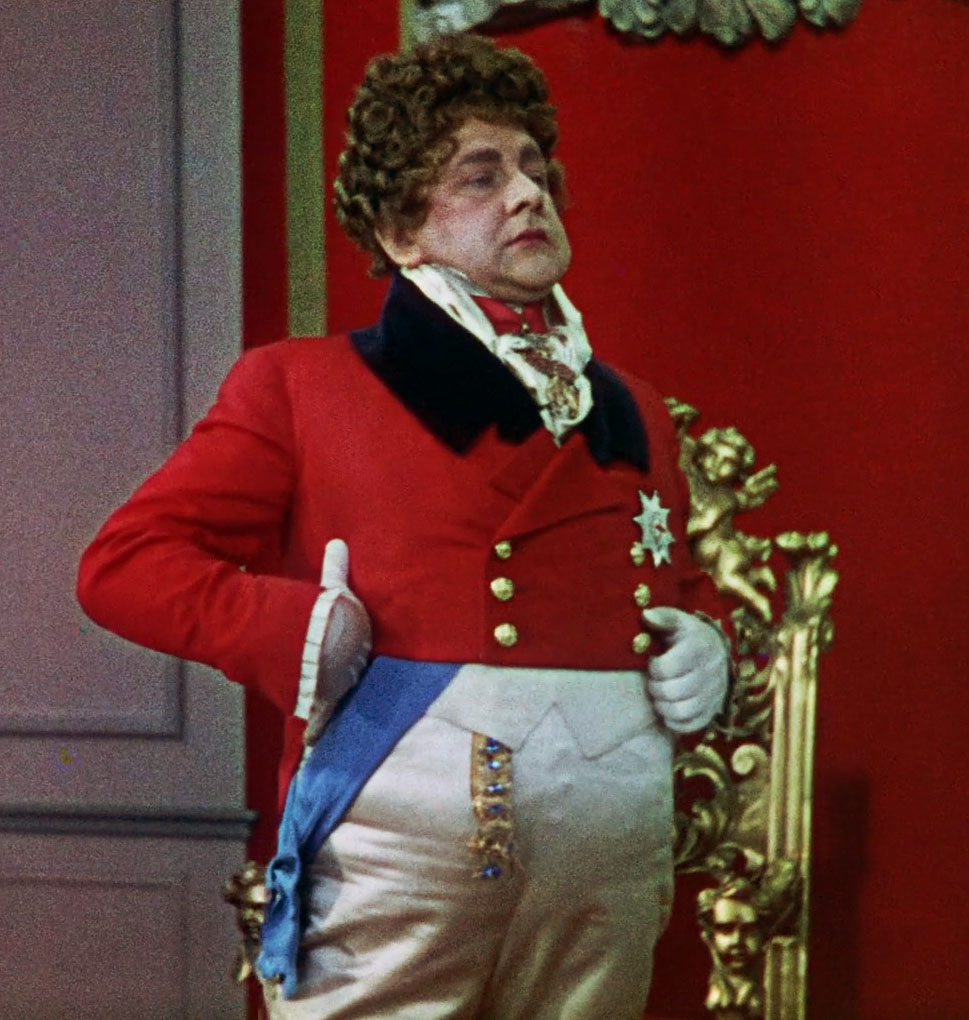
- Hytten in Becky Sharp (1935)
- Born: 3 March 1888; Glasgow, Scotland
- Died: 11 March 1955 (aged 67); Los Angeles, California, U.S.
- Resting place: Woodlawn Cemetery
- Occupation: Actor
- Years active: 1921–1955

Olaf Hytten (3 March 1888 – 11 March 1955) was a Scottish actor. He appeared in more than 280 films between 1921 and 1955. He was born in Glasgow, Scotland, and died in Los Angeles, California from a heart attack, while sitting in his car in the parking lot at 20th Century Fox Studios. His remains are interred in an unmarked crypt, located in Santa Monica's Woodlawn Cemetery.

== Filmography ==
- Demos (1921) - Daniel Dabbs (film debut)
- Money (1921) - Henry Graves
- The Knave of Diamonds (1921) - Sir Giles Carfax
- Sonia (1921) - Fatty Webster
- The Knight Errant (1922) - Hernando Perez
- Trapped by the Mormons (1922) - Elder Marz
- The Wonderful Story (1922) - Jimmy Martin
- The Crimson Circle (1922)
- The Missioner (1922) - Stephen Hurd
- His Wife's Husband (1922) - Fred Pearson
- A Gamble with Hearts (1923) - Dallas Jr.
- The Little Door Into the World (1923) - Mountebank
- Out to Win (1923) - Cumberston
- Chu-Chin-Chow (1923) - Mukhill
- The White Shadow (1924) - Herbert Barnes
- It Is the Law (1924) - Bill Elliott
- The Salvation Hunters (1925) - The Brute
- Marriage License? (1926) - Detective (uncredited)
- The Better 'Ole (1926) - German Officer (uncredited)
- Old Age Handicap (1928)
- Master and Man (1929) - Lord Overbury
- Kitty (1929) - Leaper
- City of Play (1929) - Schulz
- The Return of Dr. Fu Manchu (1930) - Deacon at Wedding (uncredited)
- Grumpy (1930) - Keble
- Playboy of Paris (1930) - Nightclub Waiter (uncredited)
- Along Came Youth (1930) - Minor Role (uncredited)
- Unfaithful (1931) - Minor Role (uncredited)
- Born to Love (1931) - Aide to Major General (uncredited)
- Forbidden Adventure (1931) - Florist (uncredited)
- Secrets of a Secretary (1931) - Court Reporter (uncredited)
- Daughter of the Dragon (1931) - Flinders the Butler (uncredited)
- Platinum Blonde (1931) - Mr. Radcliffe (uncredited)
- Under Eighteen (1931) - Penthouse Party Guest (uncredited)
- Peach O'Reno (1931) - Croupier (uncredited)
- Lovers Courageous (1932) - Perry (uncredited)
- Love Bound (1932) - Ship Passenger (uncredited)
- The Impatient Maiden (1932) - Doctor at Lecture (uncredited)
- Arsène Lupin (1932) - Party Guest (uncredited)
- The Wet Parade (1932) - Nightclubber Asking the Time (uncredited)
- Beauty and the Boss (1932) - Business Associate (uncredited)
- But the Flesh Is Weak (1932) - Party Guest (uncredited)
- The Man Called Back (1932) - Upper Level Court Clerk (uncredited)
- Crooner (1932) - Impatient Nightclub Patron (uncredited)
- The Night Club Lady (1932) - Walter - Colt's Butler (uncredited)
- The Eagle and the Hawk (1933) - Story-Telling Officer at Party (uncredited)
- A Study in Scarlet (1933) - Merrydew's Butler (uncredited)
- He Couldn't Take It (1933) - Professor Brewster Stevens (uncredited)
- Blind Adventure (1933) - Lady Rockingham's Butler (uncredited)
- The Masquerader (1933) - Doctor (uncredited)
- Berkeley Square (1933) - Sir Joshua Reynolds
- Design for Living (1933) - Englishman at Train (uncredited)
- The House on 56th Street (1933) - Peggy's Butler (uncredited)
- The Women in His Life (1933) - Page (uncredited)
- Lady Killer (1933) - Mr. Marley's Butler (uncredited)
- Mandalay (1934) - Cockney Purser (uncredited)
- The Mystery of Mr. X (1934) - Reporter (uncredited)
- Jimmy the Gent (1934) - Atlantis Steward (uncredited)
- Journal of a Crime (1934) - Victor - Butler (uncredited)
- Mystery Liner (1934) - Grimson's Aide (uncredited)
- Glamour (1934) - Dobbs (uncredited)
- Sisters Under the Skin (1934) - Butler
- The Key (1934) - First Regular (uncredited)
- Let's Talk It Over (1934) - Waiter (uncredited)
- Money Means Nothing (1934) - Parsons - the Butler (uncredited)
- Murder in the Private Car (1934) - Man Asking About Radio (uncredited)
- Whom the Gods Destroy (1934) - Purser of the Balkan (uncredited)
- Shock (1934) - Adjutant (uncredited)
- Jane Eyre (1934) - Jeweler (uncredited)
- Bulldog Drummond Strikes Back (1934) - Hotel Clerk (uncredited)
- The Moonstone (1934) - Dr. Ezra Jennings
- One Night of Love (1934) - Bill's Valet (uncredited)
- British Agent (1934) - Under Secretary Avery (uncredited)
- The Richest Girl in the World (1934) - Valet (uncredited)
- Happiness Ahead (1934) - Bradford's Butler (uncredited)
- What Every Woman Knows (1934) - Meeting Chairman (uncredited)
- Girl o' My Dreams (1934) - Prof. E. Phlatt (uncredited)
- The Painted Veil (1934) - Dr. Somerset (uncredited)
- Secret of the Chateau (1934) - LaFarge (uncredited)
- Strange Wives (1934) - Jim's Butler
- Red Morning (1934) - McTavish
- The Little Minister (1934) - Cruickshank - Villager (uncredited)
- Clive of India (1935) - Parson at Hustine (uncredited)
- After Office Hours (1935) - Patterson's Butler (uncredited)
- Vanessa: Her Love Story (1935) - Herries Family Member (uncredited)
- Traveling Saleslady (1935) - Twitchell's Butler (uncredited)
- The Florentine Dagger (1935) - Scotland Yard Radio Operator (uncredited)
- Les Misérables (1935) - Pierre (uncredited)
- Mister Dynamite (1935) - Police Chemist (uncredited)
- Becky Sharp (1935) - The Prince Regent
- Going Highbrow (1935) - Watkins - Butler (uncredited)
- Bonnie Scotland (1935) - Scottish Recruiting Sergeant (uncredited)
- Atlantic Adventure (1935) - Ship's Doctor (uncredited)
- Anna Karenina (1935) - Butler (uncredited)
- The Dark Angel (1935) - Mills (uncredited)
- Two Sinners (1935) - French Judge
- His Night Out (1935) - Butler (uncredited)
- She Couldn't Take It (1935) - Van Dyke Butler (uncredited)
- The Spanish Cape Mystery (1935) - DuPre
- The Last Outpost (1935) - Doctor (uncredited)
- Metropolitan (1935) - Male Modiste (uncredited)
- A Feather in Her Hat (1935) - Taxi Driver (uncredited)
- I Found Stella Parish (1935) - Robert - Stephan's Butler (uncredited)
- Ship Cafe (1935) - Butler (uncredited)
- Thanks a Million (1935) - Byron (uncredited)
- The Widow from Monte Carlo (1935) - Englishman at Casino (uncredited)
- Sylvia Scarlett (1935) - Customs Inspector (uncredited)
- The Lone Wolf Returns (1935) - Bancrofts' Butler (uncredited)
- The Garden Murder Case (1936) - Vance's Butler (uncredited)
- Sutter's Gold (1936) - Johann, Waiter (uncredited)
- Doughnuts and Society (1936) - Wellington
- The House of a Thousand Candles (1936) - Sergeant
- And So They Were Married (1936) - Secretary (uncredited)
- Sons o' Guns (1936) - Sentry (uncredited)
- Trouble for Two (1936) - Butler (uncredited)
- The White Angel (1936) - Orderly in Dr. Hunt's Office (uncredited)
- Shakedown (1936) - Butler (uncredited)
- The Last of the Mohicans (1936) - King George II
- Libeled Lady (1936) - Reporter (uncredited)
- The Charge of the Light Brigade (1936) - Officer (uncredited)
- House of Secrets (1936) - Wilson (uncredited)
- Love Letters of a Star (1936) - Thompson
- Lloyd's of London (1936) - Telescope Man (uncredited)
- White Hunter (1936) - Barton
- With Love and Kisses (1936) - Dickson
- Camille (1936) - Baccarat Croupier (uncredited)
- The Good Earth (1937) - Liu - Grain Merchant
- We Have Our Moments (1937) - Steward (uncredited)
- California Straight Ahead! (1937) - Huggins
- Parnell (1937) - House of Commons Member (uncredited)
- Dangerous Holiday (1937) - Popcorn
- The Emperor's Candlesticks (1937) - Conspirator (uncredited)
- I Cover the War! (1937) - Sir Herbert
- Easy Living (1937) - Joseph a.k.a. Justin - Houseman (uncredited)
- Souls at Sea (1937) - Proprietor (uncredited)
- Double or Nothing (1937) - Eustace the Butler (uncredited)
- Lancer Spy (1937) - Barber (uncredited)
- Angel (1937) - Consolidated Press Photographer (uncredited)
- Conquest (1937) - Conspirator (uncredited)
- The Great Garrick (1937) - Ambassador in 'Hamlet' (uncredited)
- Ebb Tide (1937) - English Tourist (uncredited)
- First Lady (1937) - Bleeker
- Bluebeard's Eighth Wife (1938) - Store President's Valet (uncredited)
- The Adventures of Robin Hood (1938) - Outlaw (uncredited)
- The Lone Wolf in Paris (1938) - Jenkins
- Lord Jeff (1938) - Instructor (uncredited)
- Blond Cheat (1938) - Paul Douglas
- Marie Antoinette (1938) - Monsieur Boehmer - the Jeweler (uncredited)
- Secrets of an Actress (1938) - Reynolds - Peter's Butler (uncredited)
- Arrest Bulldog Drummond (1938) - Island Police Arresting Sergeant (uncredited)
- Up the River (1938) - Ship Steward (uncredited)
- A Christmas Carol (1938) - Schoolmaster (uncredited)
- Zaza (1938) - Waiter (uncredited)
- The Little Princess (1939) - Pedestrian Discussing the War (uncredited)
- The Lady and the Mob (1939) - Brewster - Hattie's Butler (uncredited)
- Broadway Serenade (1939) - Hotel Manager (uncredited)
- The Flying Irishman (1939) - Irish Airport Radio Operator (uncredited)
- Man of Conquest (1939) - Footman (uncredited)
- The Sun Never Sets (1939) - Statesman (uncredited)
- 6,000 Enemies (1939) - Prison Photographer (uncredited)
- Andy Hardy Gets Spring Fever (1939) - Mr. Higgenbotham
- Our Leading Citizen (1939) - Charles, the Butler
- Rio (1939) - Banker (uncredited)
- The Great Commandment (1939) - Nathan
- Pride of the Blue Grass (1939) - Spectator (uncredited)
- Mr. Smith Goes to Washington (1939) - Butler (uncredited)
- Television Spy (1939) - Wagner - Llewellyn's Butler
- Little Accident (1939) - Meggs (uncredited)
- Rulers of the Sea (1939) - Third Secretary (uncredited)
- Allegheny Uprising (1939) - General Gage
- Our Neighbors – The Carters (1939) - Butler (uncredited)
- We Are Not Alone (1939) - Mr. Clark (uncredited)
- The Earl of Chicago (1940) - Hodges (uncredited)
- Calling Philo Vance (1940) - Charles (uncredited)
- Parole Fixer (1940) - Carter, Butler (uncredited)
- Drums of Fu Manchu (1940, Serial) - Dr. Flinders Petrie
- Gaucho Serenade (1940) - Norton School Headmaster (uncredited)
- Escape to Glory (1940) - Agent
- Captain Caution (1940) - Stannage's Officer Aide (uncredited)
- No Time for Comedy (1940) - Pearson (uncredited)
- The Howards of Virginia (1940) - Witt (uncredited)
- Arise, My Love (1940) - Employee (uncredited)
- Rage in Heaven (1941) - Hotel Clerk (uncredited)
- Footsteps in the Dark (1941) - Horace - Warren's Butler (uncredited)
- That Hamilton Woman (1941) - Gavin
- Washington Melodrama (1941) - Parry
- All the World's a Stooge (1941, Short) - Botters - Butler (uncredited)
- For Beauty's Sake (1941) - Father McKinley
- Man Hunt (1941) - Piel - Saul's Law Clerk (uncredited)
- Blondie in Society (1941) - Butler (uncredited)
- The Bride Came C.O.D. (1941) - Winfield's Valet (uncredited)
- Dr. Jekyll and Mr. Hyde (1941) - Hobson (uncredited)
- When Ladies Meet (1941) - Matthews (uncredited)
- Nine Lives Are Not Enough (1941) - Richards - Jane's Butler (uncredited)
- Passage from Hong Kong (1941) - British Official (uncredited)
- The Blonde from Singapore (1941) - Doorman (uncredited)
- The Wolf Man (1941) - Villager (uncredited)
- Bedtime Story (1941) - Alfred
- Son of Fury: The Story of Benjamin Blake (1942) - Court Clerk (uncredited)
- To Be or Not to Be (1942) - Polonius in Warsaw (uncredited)
- The Ghost of Frankenstein (1942) - Hussman
- The Affairs of Jimmy Valentine (1942) - Butler
- A Gentleman After Dark (1942) - Butler (uncredited)
- You're Telling Me (1942) - Fielding (uncredited)
- This Above All (1942) - Proprietor (uncredited)
- Spy Ship (1942) - Drake, the Butler
- Eagle Squadron (1942) - Day Controller
- The Voice of Terror (1942) - Fabian Prentiss
- Destination Unknown (1942) - Wing Fu
- Lucky Jordan (1942) - Charles the Servant (uncredited)
- Casablanca (1942) - Pickpocketed Prosperous Man (uncredited)
- The Black Swan (1942) - Clerk Reading Proclamation (uncredited)
- Journey for Margaret (1942) - Hotel Manager (uncredited)
- The Great Impersonation (1942) - Faye, Tobacco Shop Owner (uncredited)
- Happy Go Lucky (1943) - Jeweler (uncredited)
- The Gorilla Man (1943) - Hospital attendant (uncredited)
- Silent Witness (1943) - Sidney
- London Blackout Murders (1943) - Court Usher - Bailiff (uncredited)
- The Amazing Mrs. Holliday (1943) - Cable Office Clerk (uncredited)
- Hit Parade of 1943 (1943) - Waiter (uncredited)
- Mission to Moscow (1943) - Parliament Member (uncredited)
- Holy Matrimony (1943) - Cockney (uncredited)
- Sherlock Holmes Faces Death (1943) - Captain MacIntosh
- Flesh and Fantasy (1943) - Chemist (uncredited)
- The Return of the Vampire (1943) - Ben - Lady Jane's Butler (uncredited)
- The Lodger (1944) - Harris - The Haberdasher (uncredited)
- Passport to Destiny (1944) - Mr. Hawkins (uncredited)
- Detective Kitty O'Day (1944) - Butler
- The Scarlet Claw (1944) - Hotel Day Desk Clerk (uncredited)
- Ministry of Fear (1944) - Tailor's Shop Clerk (uncredited)
- The Invisible Man's Revenge (1944) - Gray - a Cabman (uncredited)
- Leave It to the Irish (1944) - The Hamilton Butler
- Oh, What a Night (1944) - Wyndy
- Our Hearts Were Young and Gay (1944) - Deck Steward (uncredited)
- Babes on Swing Street (1944) - William (uncredited)
- House of Frankenstein (1944) - Hoffman
- National Velvet (1944) - Villager (uncredited)
- The Suspect (1944) - Mr. Jevne (uncredited)
- A Guy, a Gal and a Pal (1945) - Butler (uncredited)
- The Brighton Strangler (1945) - Banks - the valet
- The Woman in Green (1945) - Norris - Fenwick's Butler (uncredited)
- Christmas in Connecticut (1945) - Elkins (uncredited)
- Scotland Yard Investigator (1945) - Purvis (uncredited)
- Pursuit to Algiers (1945) - Stimson (uncredited)
- Confidential Agent (1945) - Harry Bates (uncredited)
- Hold That Blonde (1945) - Charles (uncredited)
- My Name Is Julia Ross (1945) - The Reverend Lewis (uncredited)
- Three Strangers (1946) - Prison Turnkey (uncredited)
- The Notorious Lone Wolf (1946) - Prince of Rapur (uncredited)
- She-Wolf of London (1946) - Constable Alfred (uncredited)
- Dressed to Kill (1946) - Alfred - Auction House Bookkeeper (uncredited)
- Holiday in Mexico (1946) - (uncredited)
- Black Beauty (1946) - Mr. Gordon
- The Verdict (1946) - Sergeant (uncredited)
- Magnificent Doll (1946) - Blennerhassett (uncredited)
- Alias Mr. Twilight (1946) - Eckles
- That Way with Women (1947) - Davis
- The Ghost Goes Wild (1947) - Manservant (uncredited)
- Bells of San Angelo (1947) - Lionel Bates
- The Private Affairs of Bel Ami (1947) - Keeper of the Seals
- The Imperfect Lady (1947) - Butler (uncredited)
- Unconquered (1947) - Officer on 'Star of London' (uncredited)
- If Winter Comes (1947) - Officer at Inquest (uncredited)
- The Shanghai Chest (1948) - Bates - the Butler
- Kidnapped (1948) - The Red Fox
- A Connecticut Yankee in King Arthur's Court (1949) - Tailor (uncredited)
- The Secret of St. Ives (1949) - Defense Officer (uncredited)
- Challenge to Lassie (1949) - Reeves (uncredited)
- That Forsyte Woman (1949) - Gallery Assistant in London (uncredited)
- Rogues of Sherwood Forest (1950) - Charcoal Burner (uncredited)
- Fancy Pants (1950) - Stage Manager (uncredited)
- Kim (1950) - Mr. Fairlee (uncredited)
- Anne of the Indies (1951) - Capt. Harris (uncredited)
- The Son of Dr. Jekyll (1951) - Prosecutor (uncredited)
- Les Misérables (1952) - Judge (uncredited)
- Million Dollar Mermaid (1952) - Minor Role (uncredited)
- Against All Flags (1952) - King William (uncredited)
- Perils of the Jungle (1953) - Mac
- Fort Ti (1953) - Governor (uncredited)
- The Scarlet Coat (1955) - Maj. Andre's Butler (uncredited)
