= Natalie Joyce =

American actress

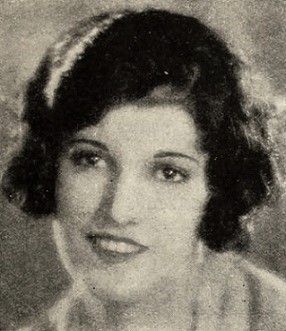
- Joyce in March 1925
- Born: Natalie Marie Johnson; November 6, 1902; Norfolk, Virginia, U.S.
- Died: November 9, 1992 (aged 90); San Diego, California, U.S.
- Occupation: Actress
- Relatives: Olive Borden (cousin)

Natalie Joyce (born Natalie Marie Johnson; November 6, 1902 – November 9, 1992) was an American actress.

== Biography ==
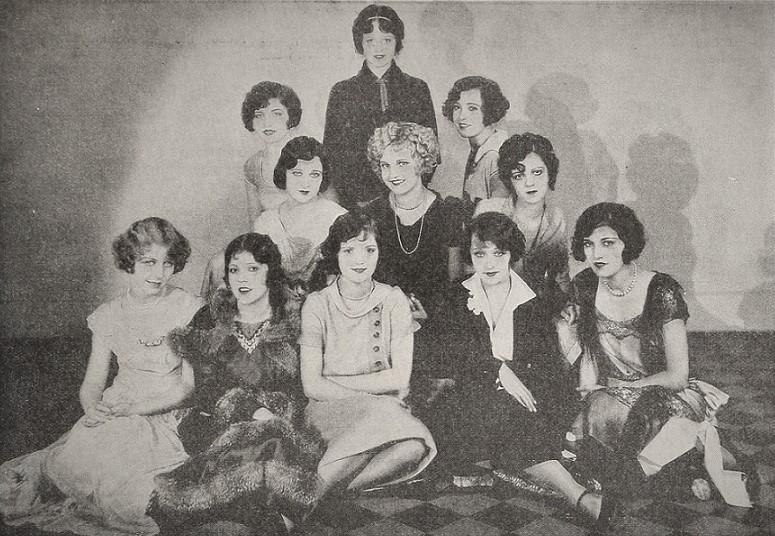
The WAMPAS Baby Stars of 1925 Natalie Joyce is seated, lower right

Born as Natalie Marie Johnson on November 6, 1902, one of eight children to Henry and Elizabeth Johnson in Norfolk, Virginia, U.S. In 1920, at the ago of 18, Johnson's first job performing was alongside her oldest sister in the Ziegfeld Follies. She moved to Los Angeles, CA in 1922 and began her motion picture career in a series of two-reel comedies produced by the Christie Film Company. Around this time she began being billed as Natalie Joyce. She was named one of the WAMPAS Baby Stars of 1925. In 1927 she co-starred as a circus entertainer with Tom Mix in The Circus Ace for Fox Pictures. In 1928 she portrayed a Panama beauty in A Girl in Every Port, and she was part of the cast of Through the Breakers. Her first cousin was actress Olive Borden.

Joyce gave the Los Angeles Police Department important information in their quest to find two physicians wanted in the death of 22-year-old dancer Delphine Walsh in May 1929. Walsh died in a Glendale, California hospital following an illegal procedure, the term then used for an abortion.

After being away from making movies for a time, Joyce returned in Cock o' the Walk (1930), also known as The Soul of the Tango. Produced by James Cruze, the cast included Joseph Schildkraut, Myrna Loy, and Olive Tell. Joyce appeared in the ingenue role.

After retiring from acting, Joyce worked as a bookkeeper and opened a hair salon. She married aviator William Morris Pryce in 1933. The couple had one son named Michael. Joyce died in San Diego, California in 1992, aged 90.

== Partial filmography ==
- The Circus Ace (1927)
- Whispering Sage (1927)
- Daredevil's Reward (1928)
- A Girl in Every Port (1928)
- Naughty Baby (1928)
- Through the Breakers (1928)
- Pals of the Prairie (1929)
- Laughing at Death (1929)
- The Man from Nevada (1929)
- Times Square (1929)
- Sailor's Holiday (1929)
- Cock o' the Walk (1930) *lost film
- Police Court (1932)
