= Daredevil's Reward =

1928 film

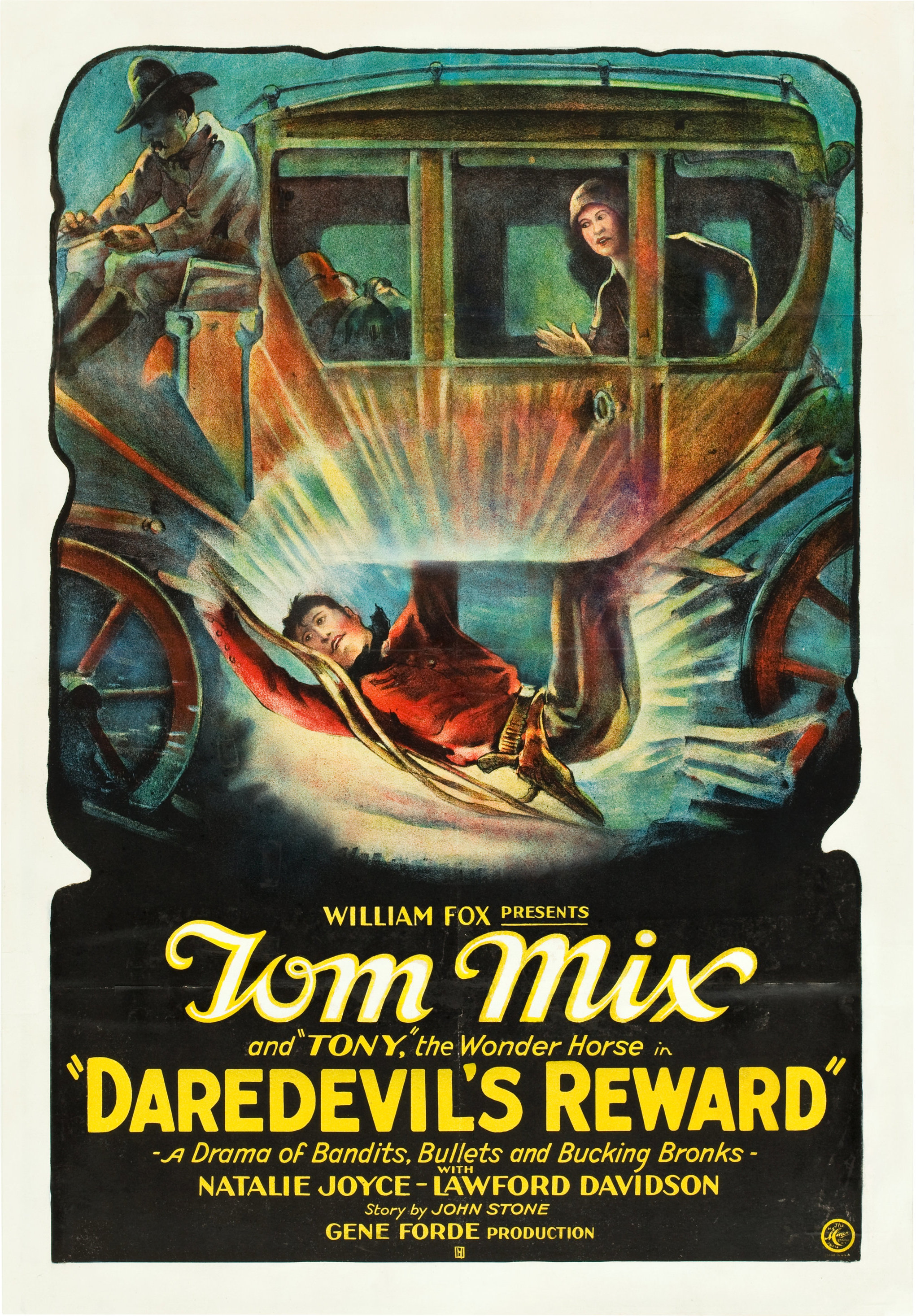
- Theatrical release poster
- Directed by: Eugene Forde
- Screenplay by: John Stone
- Story by: John Stone
- Starring: Tom Mix; Natalie Joyce; Lawford Davidson; Billy Bletcher; Harry Cording; William Welsh
- Cinematography: Daniel B. Clark
- Production company: Fox Film Corporation
- Distributed by: Fox Film Corporation
- Release date: January 15, 1928
- Running time: 50 minutes
- Country: United States
- Languages: Silent; English intertitles

Daredevil's Reward is a 1928 American silent Western film directed by Eugene Forde and written by John Stone. The film stars Tom Mix, Natalie Joyce, Lawford Davidson, Billy Bletcher, Harry Cording, and William Welsh. The film was released on January 15, 1928, by Fox Film Corporation.

== Cast ==
- Tom Mix as Tom Hardy
- Natalie Joyce as Ena Powell
- Lawford Davidson as Foster
- Billy Bletcher as Slim
- Harry Cording as Second Heavy
- William Welsh as James Powell

== Preservation ==
With no holdings located in archives, Daredevil's Reward is considered a lost film.

== See also ==
- Tom Mix filmography
- 1937 Fox vault fire
