= The Sun Never Sets (1939 film) =

1939 film by Rowland V. Lee

- Directed by: Rowland V. Lee
- Written by: W. P. Lipscomb
- Based on: a story by: Arthur Fitz-Richard; Jerry Horwin
- Produced by: Rowland V. Lee
- Starring: Douglas Fairbanks Jr.; Basil Rathbone; Barbara O'Neil
- Cinematography: George Robinson
- Edited by: Ted J. Kent
- Music by: Frank Skinner
- Production company: Universal Pictures
- Distributed by: Universal Pictures
- Release date: May 31, 1939
- Running time: 97 minutes
- Country: United States
- Language: English
- Budget: $800,000

The Sun Never Sets is a 1939 American drama film directed by Rowland V. Lee and starring Douglas Fairbanks Jr., Basil Rathbone and Barbara O'Neil.

== Plot ==
The Randolph family have a tradition of working in the British colonial service. Clive comes home from a mission in the Gold Coast of Africa accompanied by his wife Helen. He discovers his younger brother John, who is in love with Phyllis is not keen on following in his footsteps.

John is persuaded to try colonial service by his grandfather Sir John. John goes to the Gold Coast. He is accompanied by Clive who has been sent to investigate the source of a series of radio broadcasts that are sewing unrest throughout the world. These may be linked to Hugo Zurof, a man plotting to rule the world.

Clive leaves his pregnant wife Helen behind to go on a mission. Zurof tricks John into calling his brother back, causing Clive to be sent home in disgrace, despite the fact that Clive and Helen's child dies in childbirth.

John goes to Zurof's base and infiltrates it by pretending to be drunk. He manages to broadcast a code to his family. Clive leads a bombing mission to destroy the base. John survives it. Zurof and his men are killed.

== Cast ==
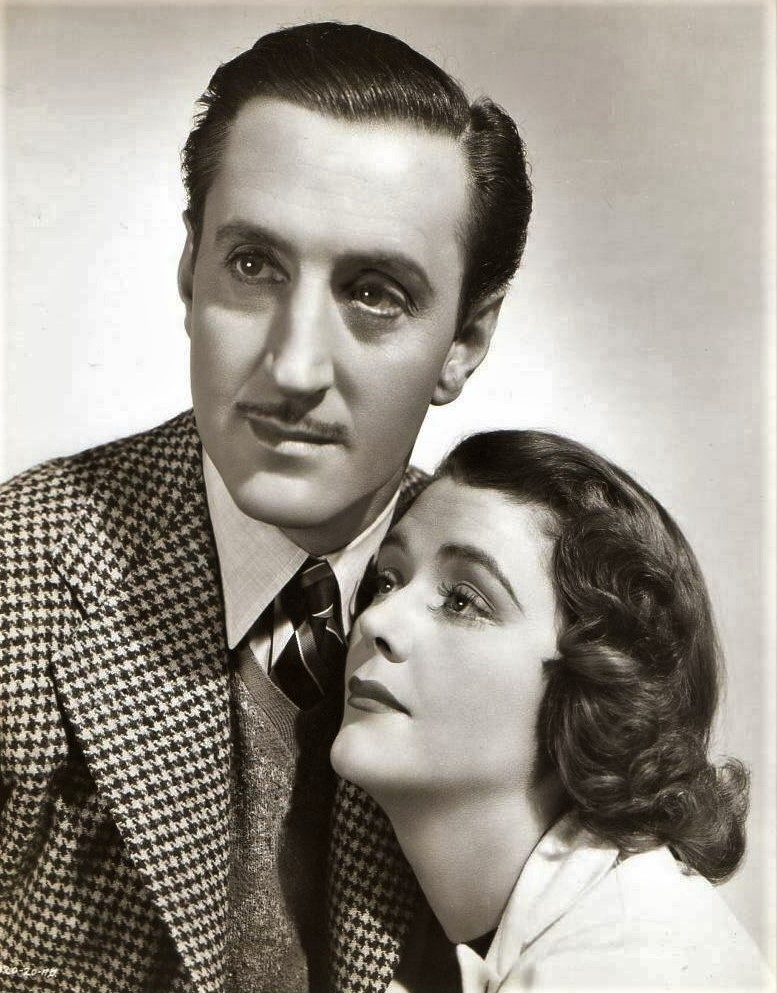
Basil Rathbone and Barbara O'Neil in The Sun Never Sets

- Douglas Fairbanks Jr. as John Randolph
- Basil Rathbone as Clive Randolph
- Barbara O'Neil as Helen Randolph
- Lionel Atwill as Zurof
- Virginia Field as Phyllis
- C. Aubrey Smith as Sir John Randolph
- Melville Cooper as Cosey
- Mary Forbes as Mrs. Randolph
- John Burton as Simon
- Arthur Mulliner as Uncle Gerald
- Theodore von Eltz as Delafons
- Douglas Walton as Carpenter
- Cecil Kellaway as Colonial Official
- Lionel Belmore as Third Selection Board Member
- Sidney Bracey as Minister of Colonial Affairs
- Jess Lee Brooks as Angry - Heavyset Chief
- Russell Burroughs as Young Candidate
- Frederick Clarke as Dr. Anderson
- Harry Cording as Zurof Camp Guard
- Jack Deery as Command Bomber Pilot
- Al Duvall as Kim Kroo
- James Eagles as Assistant Operator
- Mary Field as Maid
- Lawrence Grant as Second Selection Board Member
- Eddie Hall as Henchman Bringing John Randolph Through Sliding Doors
- Holmes Herbert as Colonial Official
- Claude Horton as Sir Walter Raleigh
- Philip Hurlic as Tuppence - Native Boy
- Brandon Hurst as A Doctor
- Olaf Hytten as Statesman
- Edward Keane as DNXY Radio Operator
- Robert Emmett Keane as Henchman Careira
- Walter McGrail as Henchman DaCosta
- Lew Payton as Village Chief
- Hilda Plowright as Queen Elizabeth
- Napier Raikes as First Selection Board Member
- Hassan Said as 'Palaver' Translator
- C. Montague Shaw as Colonial Affairs Official
- Ivan F. Simpson as A Doctor
- Eric Snowden as The Randolph Manservant
- Eric Wilton as Colonial Affairs Official

== Production ==
The film had been in development and Universal "on and off" for three years. Eventually Rowland V. Lee was assigned to direct and Basil Rathbone to star. (The two men had just made Son of Frankenstein together.) In February Douglas Fairbanks Jr. signed to co star.

The script was written by W.P. Lipscomb who said the film wanted to pay tribute to the British colonial service.

We attacked it by telling the story of one family, typical of hundreds of families who devote their lives to "the service." We show human beings and human emotions involved in affairs greater than themselves., and watch how they react. ' They are not conscious heroes; they make bad mistakes and cause intense suffering- If they worry through, it is by keeping their sense of humour in desperate circumstances and trusting that doing one's best, although one can't see the end in sight, may sometimes bring unexpected results. That is a trait common to all people in "the service" and is particularly true of Englishmen whose ability to take on a big job, face difficulties and meet them with good humour when 'things go badly, is accepted as one of the finest traditions of their national character.

Filming began 13 March 1939. Lipscomb was a friend of Virginia Field and wrote her into the movie.

Douglas Fairbanks Jr. says C Aubrey Smith walked up to him on the first day of filming and said, "Rotten title. It already has set."

== Reception ==
Fairbanks Jr. said the film "did nothing at the bo [box office] because Americans were realizing we'd soon be at war."

== Bibliography ==
- Dick, Bernard F. The Star-Spangled Screen: The American World War II Film. University Press of Kentucky, 2015.
