= One Increasing Purpose =

1927 film by Harry Beaumont

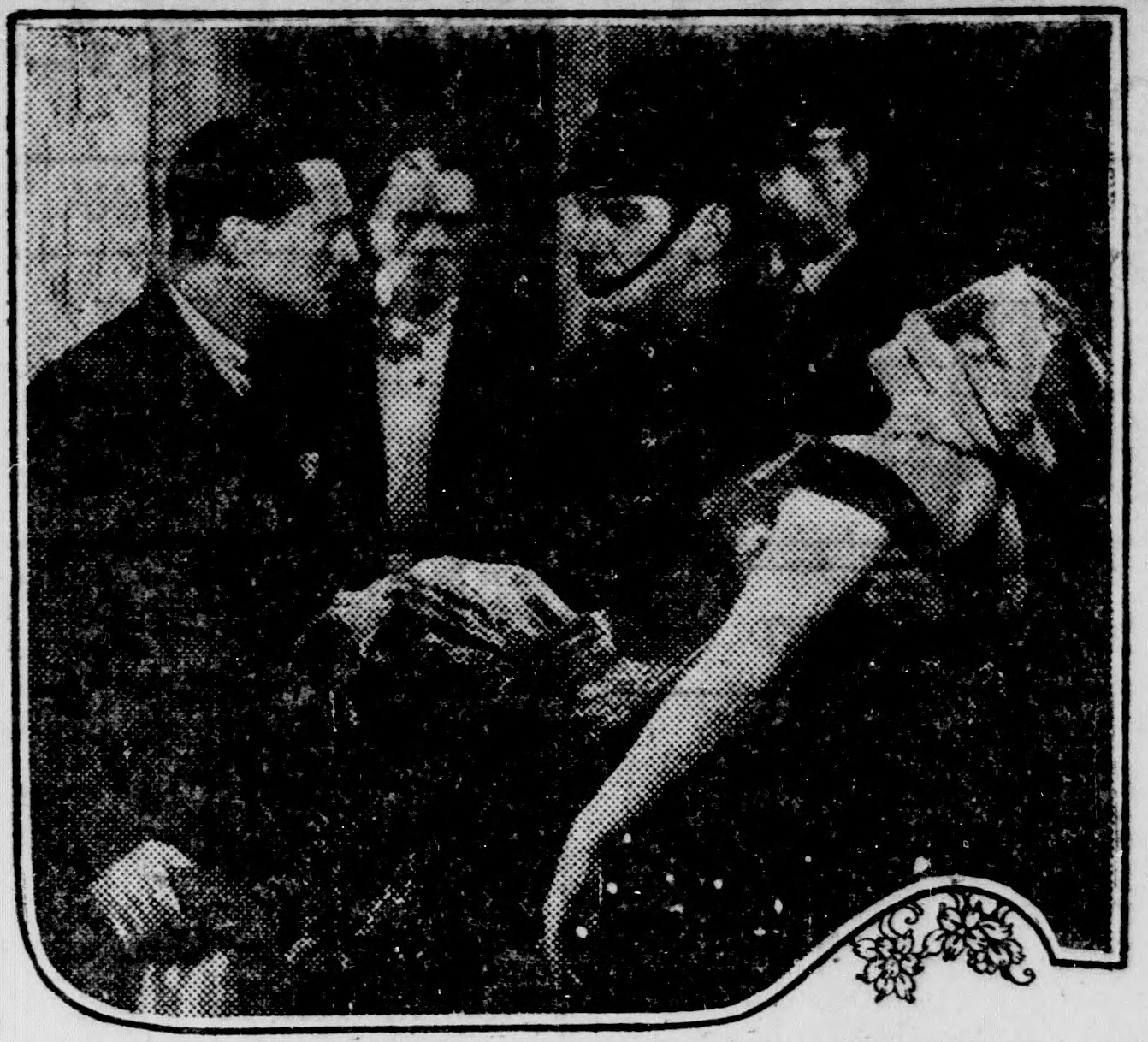
- Contemporary publicity photo for the film
- Directed by: Harry Beaumont
- Screenplay by: Bradley King
- Based on: One Increasing Purpose by A. S. M. Hutchinson
- Starring: Edmund Lowe; Lila Lee; Holmes Herbert; May Allison; Huntley Gordon; Lawford Davidson
- Cinematography: Rudolph J. Bergquist
- Production company: Fox Film Corporation
- Distributed by: Fox Film Corporation
- Release date: January 2, 1927
- Running time: 80 minutes
- Country: United States
- Language: English

One Increasing Purpose is a 1927 American silent drama film directed by Harry Beaumont and written by Bradley King. It is based on the 1925 novel One Increasing Purpose by A. S. M. Hutchinson. The film stars Edmund Lowe, Lila Lee, Holmes Herbert, May Allison, Huntley Gordon and Lawford Davidson. The film was released on January 2, 1927, by Fox Film Corporation.

== Plot ==
A man returns to England having fought in the British Army during World War I. He finds both his problems are having difficulties with their marriages and sets out to help them and others.

== Cast ==
- Edmund Lowe as Slim Paris
- Lila Lee as Elizabeth Glade
- Holmes Herbert as Charles Paris
- May Allison as Linda Travers Paris
- Huntley Gordon as Andrew Paris
- Lawford Davidson as Dr. Byrne
- Emily Fitzroy as Mrs. Andiron
- George Irving as Mr. Glade
- Josef Swickard as Old Gand
- Jane Novak as Alice Paris
- Nicholas Soussanin as Jule
- Tom Maguire as Blinky
- Gwynneth Bristowe as Mrs. Yeoman
- J. Fisher White as Mr. Yeoman
