= Holmes Herbert =

English-American actor (1882–1956)

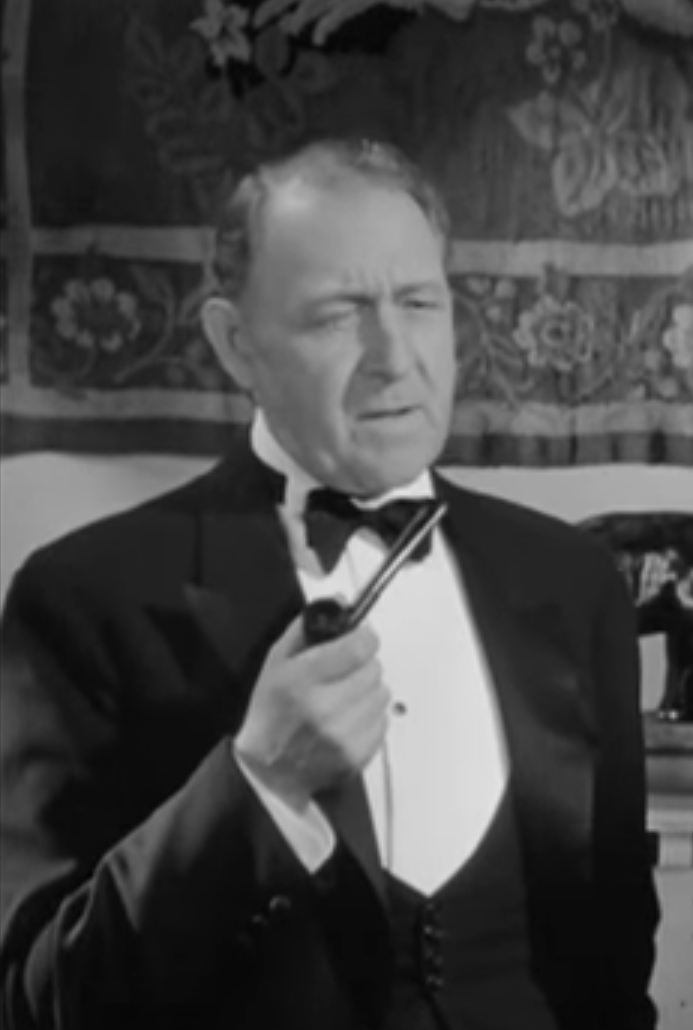
- Herbert in Sherlock Holmes and the Secret Weapon (1942)
- Born: Horace Edward Jenner; 30 July 1882; Mansfield, Nottinghamshire, England
- Died: 26 December 1956 (aged 74); Hollywood, California, U.S.
- Resting place: Forest Lawn Memorial Park, Glendale, California
- Occupation: Actor
- Years active: 1915–1952
- Spouse(s): Elinor Kershaw Ince (m. 19??; div. 19??); Beryl Mercer (m. 1909; div. 19??); Agnes Bartholomew (m. 19??; d. 1955)
- Children: 1

Holmes Herbert (born Horace Edward Jenner; 30 July 1882 – 26 December 1956) was an English character actor who appeared in Hollywood films from 1915 to 1952, often as a British gentleman.

== Early life ==
Hebert was born Horace Edward Jenner, (some sources give Edward Sanger) the first son of Edward Henry Jenner (stage name Ned Herbert), who worked as an actor and comedian in the British theatre. He emigrated to the United States in 1912.

== Career ==
Holmes Herbert never made a film in his native country but managed to appear in 228 films during his career in the U.S., beginning with stalwart leading roles during the silent era. Without audible dialogue, Herbert could play different nationalities, as did his contemporaries like Wyndham Standing, but when sound films came in, their pronounced British accents were revealed.

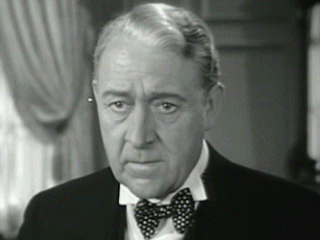
Herbert in British Intelligence (1940)

Herbert is perhaps best known for his role as Dr. Jekyll's friend Dr. Lanyon in Dr. Jekyll and Mr. Hyde (1931), and made something of a career in horror films of the period, appearing in The Terror (1928), The Thirteenth Chair (1929 and 1937), Mystery of the Wax Museum (1933), The Invisible Man (1933), Mark of the Vampire (1935), Tower of London (1939), The Ghost of Frankenstein (1942), The Undying Monster (1942), The Mummy's Curse and The Son of Dr. Jekyll (1952). He also played in several of Universal's cycle of Sherlock Holmes films during the 1940s.

Hebert had supporting roles in many classic Hollywood films of the sound era, including Captain Blood (1935), The Charge of the Light Brigade (1936), The Life of Emile Zola (1937), The Adventures of Robin Hood (1938), and Foreign Correspondent (1940).

He retired from acting in 1952.

== Personal life and death ==
Herbert was married three times. His first wife was actress Beryl Mercer, and his second was Elinor Kershaw Ince, widow of film mogul Thomas H. Ince. Both marriages ended in divorce. His third wife, Agnes Bartholomew, died in 1955, leaving Herbert a widower. He died in 1956 at age 74. He was buried in Forest Lawn Memorial Park, Glendale, California.

== Filmography ==
- His Wife (1915) - John Dennys
- Her Life and His (1917) - Ralph Howard
- The Man Without a Country (1917) - Lt. Philip Nolan
- A Doll's House (1918) - Thorvald Helmar
- The Whirlpool (1918) - Judge Reverton
- The Death Dance (1918) - Arnold Maitland
- The Divorcee (1919) - Sir Paradine Fuldes
- The Rough Neck (1919) - A Half-Breed Indian
- The White Heather (1919) - Lord Angus Cameron
- Other Men's Wives (1919) - Fenwick Flint
- The Market of Souls (1919) - Temple Bane
- The A.B.C. of Love (1919) - Harry Bryant
- On with the Dance (1920) - Minor Role
- His House in Order (1920) - Filmer Jesson
- Black Is White (1920) - Jim Brood
- My Lady's Garter (1920) - Henry Van Derp, aka The Hawk
- The Right to Love (1920) - Lord Falkland
- Lady Rose's Daughter (1920) - Jacob Delafield
- Dead Men Tell No Tales (1920) - Squire John Rattray
- The Truth About Husbands (1920) - Dustan Renshaw
- Her Lord and Master (1921) - R. Honorable Thurston Ralph, Viscount Canning
- Heedless Moths (1921) - The Sculptor
- The Wild Goose (1921) - Frank Manners
- The Inner Chamber (1921) - Edward J. Wellman
- The Family Closet (1921) - Alfred Dinsmore
- Any Wife (1922) - Philip Gray
- A Stage Romance (1922) - Prince of Wales
- Evidence (1922) - Judge Rowland
- Divorce Coupons (1922) - Roland Bland
- Moonshine Valley (1922) - Dr. Martin
- A Woman's Woman (1922) - John Plummer
- Toilers of the Sea (1923) - Sandro
- I Will Repay (1923) - Sir Percy Blakeney
- Week End Husbands (1924) - William Randall
- The Enchanted Cottage (1924) - Maj. Hillgrove
- Another Scandal (1924) - Pelham Franklin
- Her Own Free Will (1924) - Peter Craddock
- Sinners in Heaven (1924) - Hugh Rochedale
- Love's Wilderness (1924) - David Tennant
- The Lost World (1925) - Angry Man at Meeting
- Daddy's Gone A-Hunting (1925) - Greenough
- Up the Ladder (1925) - Robert Newhall
- Wildfire (1925) - Garrison
- The Wanderer (1925) - Prophet
- Wreckage (1925) - Stuart Ames
- A Woman of the World (1925) - Richard Granger
- The Passionate Quest (1926) - Erwen
- The Honeymoon Express (1926) - Jim Donaldson
- Josselyn's Wife (1926) - Thomas Josselyn
- The Fire Brigade (1926) - James Corwin
- One Increasing Purpose (1927) - Charles Paris
- The Nest (1927) - Richard Elliot
- When a Man Loves (1927) - Jean Tiberge
- Mr. Wu (1927) - Mr. Gregory
- Lovers (1927) - Milton
- The Heart of Salome (1927) - Sir Humphrey
- Slaves of Beauty (1927) - Leonard Jones
- The Gay Retreat (1927) - Charles Wright
- East Side, West Side (1927) - Gilbert Van Horn
- The Silver Slave (1927) - Tom Richards
- Gentlemen Prefer Blondes (1928) - Henry Spoffard
- Their Hour (1928) - Cora's Father
- The Sporting Age (1928) - James Driscoll
- The Terror (1928) - Goodman
- Through the Breakers (1928) - Eustis Hobbs
- On Trial (1928) - Gerald Trask
- The Charlatan (1929) - Count Merlin - aka Peter Dwight
- Careers (1929) - Carouge
- Say It with Songs (1929) - Dr. Robert Merrill
- Madame X (1929) - Noel
- Her Private Life (1929) - Rudolph Solomon
- The Careless Age (1929) - Sir John
- The Thirteenth Chair (1929) - Sir Roscoe Crosby
- The Kiss (1929) - M. Lassalle
- Untamed (1929) - Howard Presley
- The Ship from Shanghai (1930) - Paul Thorpe
- The Single Sin (1931) - Roger Van Dorn
- The Hot Heiress (1931) - Mr. Hunter
- Chances (1931) - Maj. Bradford
- Broadminded (1931) - John J. Hackett Sr.
- Daughter of the Dragon (1931) - Sir John Petrie
- Dr. Jekyll and Mr. Hyde (1931) - Dr. John Lanyon
- Shop Angel (1932) - James Walton Kennedy
- Miss Pinkerton (1932) - Arthur Glenn
- Central Park (1932) - Benefit Emcee
- Sister to Judas (1932) - Bruce Rogers
- Mystery of the Wax Museum (1933) - Dr. Rasmussen
- The Invisible Man (1933) - Chief of Police
- Beloved (1934) - Lord Landslake
- The House of Rothschild (1934) - Rowerth
- The Count of Monte Cristo (1934) - Judge
- The Pursuit of Happiness (1934) - Gen. Sir Henry Clinton
- The Curtain Falls (1934) - John Scorsby
- Sons of Steel (1934) - Curtis Chadburne
- One in a Million (1935) - Donald Cabot, Sr.
- Cardinal Richelieu (1935) - Noble
- Mark of the Vampire (1935) - Sir Karell Borotyn
- Accent on Youth (1935) - Frank Galloway
- The Dark Angel (1935) - Major in Dugout
- Captain Blood (1935) - Capt. Gardner
- Wife vs. Secretary (1936) - Frawley
- Brilliant Marriage (1936) - Mr. Rodney Allison
- The Country Beyond (1936) - Insp. Reed
- Champagne Charlie (1936) - Capt. Dell
- The White Angel (1936) - War Minister
- Charlie Chan at the Race Track (1936) - Chief Steward, Melbourne Cup
- The Gentleman from Louisiana (1936) - Chief Steward
- 15 Maiden Lane (1936) - Harold Anderson
- The Charge of the Light Brigade (1936) - Gen. O'Neill
- House of Secrets (1936) - Sir Bertram Evans - Home Secretary
- Lloyd's of London (1936) - Spokesman
- Stolen Holiday (1937) - Nicole's Dance Partner at Party
- The Prince and the Pauper (1937) - First Doctor
- The Thirteenth Chair (1937) - Sir Roscoe Crosby
- Slave Ship (1937) - Commander
- The Life of Emile Zola (1937) - Commander of Paris
- Love Under Fire (1937) - Darnley
- The Girl Said No (1937) - Charles Dillon (scenes deleted)
- Lancer Spy (1937) - Dr. Aldrich
- The Buccaneer (1938) - Captain McWilliams
- Here's Flash Casey (1938) - Major Addison
- The Black Doll (1938) - Dr. Giddings
- The Adventures of Robin Hood (1938) - Archery Referee
- Kidnapped (1938) - Judge
- Marie Antoinette (1938) - Herald
- Say It in French (1938) - Richard Carrington Sr.
- Mr. Moto's Last Warning (1939) - Bentham
- The Mystery of Mr. Wong (1939) - Prof. Ed Janney
- The Little Princess (1939) - Doctor
- Mystery of the White Room (1939) - Hospital Administrator
- Juarez (1939) - Marshal Randon
- Wolf Call (1939) - J.L. Winton
- The Sun Never Sets (1939) - Colonial Official
- Trapped in the Sky (1939) - Fielding
- The House of Fear (1939) - Minor Role
- Stanley and Livingstone (1939) - Frederick Holcomb
- The Adventures of Sherlock Holmes (1939) - Justice
- Hidden Power (1939) - Dr. Morley
- The Private Lives of Elizabeth and Essex (1939) - Majordomo
- Intermezzo (1939) - The Doctor
- 20,000 Men a Year (1939) - Dean Norris
- Rulers of the Sea (1939) - Member of Naval Company
- Tower of London (1939) - Councilman
- We Are Not Alone (1939) - Police Inspector
- Everything Happens at Night (1939) - Featherstone
- The Earl of Chicago (1940) - Sergeant-at-Arms
- British Intelligence (1940) - Arthur Bennett
- An Angel from Texas (1940) - Second Banker
- Women in War (1940) - Chief Justice
- Phantom Raiders (1940) - Sir Edward
- Foreign Correspondent (1940) - Asst. Commissioner
- Boom Town (1940) - Doctor
- A Dispatch from Reuters (1940) - Member of Parliament
- The Letter (1940) - Robert's Friend at Bar at Party
- South of Suez (1940) - Simpson
- Rage in Heaven (1941) - The Judge
- Scotland Yard (1941) - Dr. Woodward
- Man Hunt (1941) - Saul Farnsworthy
- International Squadron (1941) - Sir Basil Wryxton
- The Men in Her Life (1941) - Second Doctor
- The Ghost of Frankenstein (1942) - Magistrate
- Danger in the Pacific (1942) - Commissioner
- Lady in a Jam (1942) - Man
- Invisible Agent (1942) - Sir Alfred Spencer
- Strictly in the Groove (1942) - Commissioner
- The Undying Monster (1942) - Chief Constable
- Sherlock Holmes and the Secret Weapon (1942) - Sir. Reginald
- Sherlock Holmes in Washington (1943) - Mr. Ahrens
- A Stranger in Town (1943) - Supreme Court Justice
- Two Tickets to London (1943) - Kilgallen
- The Man from Down Under (1943) - Government Official at Train Station
- Corvette K-225 (1943) - Commodore Ramsay
- Calling Dr. Death (1943) - Bryant - the Butler
- The Uninvited (1944) - Charlie Jessup
- Bermuda Mystery (1944) - Judge
- The Pearl of Death (1944) - James Goodram
- Our Hearts Were Young and Gay (1944) - Captain
- The Unwritten Code (1944) - McDowell
- Enter Arsène Lupin (1944) - Jobson
- The Mummy's Curse (1944) - Dr. Cooper
- Sherlock Holmes and the House of Fear (1945) - Alan Cosgrave
- Jealousy (1945) - Melvyn Russell
- The Strange Affair of Uncle Harry (1945) - Warden
- Swingin' on a Rainbow (1945) - Butler
- George White's Scandals (1945) - Lord Michael Asbury
- Confidential Agent (1945) - Lord Benditch
- Three Strangers (1946) - Sir Robert
- The Bandit of Sherwood Forest (1946) - Baron
- Dressed to Kill (1946) - Ebenezer Crabtree
- Cloak and Dagger (1946) - British Officer
- The Verdict (1946) - Sir William Dawson
- Love Laughs at Andy Hardy (1946) - Dr. White, Minister
- Over the Santa Fe Trail (1947) - Doc Henderson
- Mr. District Attorney (1947) - Gallentyne
- The Ghost Goes Wild (1947) - Judge
- Bulldog Drummond at Bay (1947) - Scotland Yard Inspector McIvar
- Ivy (1947) - Mulloy
- Singapore (1947) - Rev. Thomas Barnes
- Bulldog Drummond Strikes Back (1947) - Scotland Yard Inspector McIvar
- This Time for Keeps (1947) - Norman Randall
- If Winter Comes (1947) - Mr. Broadhurst, the Chemist
- The Swordsman (1948) - Lord Glowan
- A Woman's Vengeance (1948) - Warder
- The Wreck of the Hesperus (1948) - Pastor West
- Sorry, Wrong Number (1948) - Wilkins
- Johnny Belinda (1948) - Judge
- Hills of Home (1948) - Hillocks
- Family Honeymoon (1948) - Rev. Miller
- Jungle Jim (1948) - Commissioner Geoffrey Marsden
- Command Decision (1948) - Chairman
- South of St. Louis (1949) - Sir Cecil
- The Lost Tribe (1949) - Narrator
- The Stratton Story (1949) - Doctor
- Canadian Pacific (1949) - Head of Canadian Parliament
- Barbary Pirate (1949) - Thomas Jefferson
- Post Office Investigator (1949) - James Seeley
- Mark of the Gorilla (1950) - Narrator
- The Iroquois Trail (1950) - Gen. Johnson
- To Please a Lady (1950) - Benson - Regina's Butler
- The Magnificent Yankee (1950) - Justice McKenna
- The Law and the Lady (1951) - English Colonel
- David and Bathsheba (1951) - Jesse
- Anne of the Indies (1951) - English Sea Captain
- The Son of Dr. Jekyll (1951) - Constable
- The Unknown Man (1951) - Reverend Michael
- The Wild North (1952) - Magistrate
- At Sword's Point (1952) - Mallard
- The Brigand (1952) - Archbishop
