= Broadminded (film) =

1931 film

- Film poster
- Directed by: Mervyn LeRoy
- Written by: Bert Kalmar; Harry Ruby
- Starring: Joe E. Brown; Ona Munson; William Collier Jr.
- Cinematography: Sid Hickox
- Edited by: Al Hall
- Production company: First National Pictures
- Release date: August 1, 1931
- Running time: 65 minutes
- Country: United States
- Language: English

Broadminded is a 1931 American pre-Code romantic comedy film directed by Mervyn LeRoy and starring Joe E. Brown, Ona Munson and William Collier Jr.

== Plot ==
Jack, a New York City playboy sent to California to straighten himself out after a string of scandals. His father pairs him with his "responsible" cousin, Ossie, who he does not realize is even more of a partier than his son is, and the two get mixed up with two pretty girls while driving west. Jack decides to marry his girl, but when his ex fiancé shows up and threatens to reveal his past to her, Ossie comes up with a plan to save his relationship.

== Cast ==
- Joe E. Brown as Ossie Simpson
- Ona Munson as Constance Palmer
- William Collier Jr. as Jack Hackett
- Marjorie White as Penny Packer
- Holmes Herbert as John J. Hackett Sr.
- Margaret Livingston as Mabel Robinson
- Thelma Todd as Gertie Gardner
- Bela Lugosi as Pancho Arango
- Grayce Hampton as Aunt Polly

== Production ==
Filming took place in March 1931. The movie premiered a few months fresh from their Lugosi's hit Dracula.

== Preservation status ==
- A print of the film is preserved in the Library of Congress collection.
