= Delphine Walsh =

American dancer

- Born: Delphine Dougherty; 1907; Bisbee, Arizona, U.S.
- Died: May 3, 1929 (aged 21); Glendale, California, U.S.
- Cause of death: Septic peritonitis following criminal abortion
- Resting place: Hollywood Forever Cemetery
- Occupation: Dancer

Delphine Walsh (born Delphine Dockerty, 1907 – May 3, 1929) was an American dancer. Her death following an abortion performed illegally by two doctors made headlines in 1929.

== Early life and career ==
Walsh was born Delphine Dockerty in Bisbee, Arizona. Her father, Thomas Dougherty, worked as a copper miner. She had an older sister, Dorothy. Due to poverty, Walsh's parents gave her up for adoption when she was 6 years old. She was adopted by Mrs. Mae Walsh, who later gave her dance lessons.

Walsh left Arizona and traveled to Los Angeles to become a dancer. She was immediately popular with booking agencies and began to establish herself in the theatrical world.

== Death ==
Walsh died on May 3, 1929, in a Glendale, California hospital two days after undergoing what the media then referred to as an "illegal operation". Walsh had actually undergone an abortion. Before her death, she implicated Dr. R.S. Lanterman and Dr. P.S. Traxler. Her death certificate lists her cause of death as Septic peritonitis following criminal abortion.

Lanterman, who was a Los Angeles coroner, had a history of legal troubles. In 1907, he was arrested at a bordello for being drunk and disorderly. The charges in that case were eventually dropped when a witness failed to appear to testify against Lanterman. He resigned as coroner in 1908 but was later indicted on charges of fraud after submitting falsified documents to the Board of Supervisors regarding his election and travel expenses. He was sentenced to a year in prison in April 1908, but his sentence was overturned in 1909. In 1916, he was charged after performing an abortion on a 17-year-old girl, but was later freed on a technicality. The following year, he was charged in connection with the death of Mrs. Regina Greenburg "Reggie" Evans. Evans died after Lanterman allegedly performed her abortion. Evans reportedly told her brother while she was dying that Lanterman performed the abortion but later told people at County Hospital that she had attempted the abortion herself. Lanterman denied the charges stating that they were "spite work" made by his political enemies. He was found not guilty and had his medical license reinstated in 1921 after a petition drive.

The California State Medical Examiners presided over the Walsh investigation. Lanterman and Traxler were indicted on murder charges on May 14, 1929, and were free on $15,000 bond each.

Actresses Natalie Joyce and Mildred Harris were interviewed by authorities. Joyce offered valuable information but the nature of her disclosure was kept confidential by Glendale officials. Harris confided that Walsh was a member of a troupe in which Harris played a leading part. However Harris did not know Walsh closely. Film director Mickey Moran was a key informant during the inquest, and he was a state witness in the subsequent trial.

Authorities revealed that Walsh received a letter from a man from Vancouver, British Columbia approximately one week before she died. The letter contained a substantial sum of money which was believed to have been used to fund the operation.

Lanterman and Traxler were represented by attorney Jerry Giesler. Both contended that Walsh caused her own death by performing an abortion on herself before requesting their assistance. Lanterman and Traxler were found not guilty, but both had their medical licenses revoked by the California State Board of Medical Examiners.

Walsh was buried in an unmarked grave at Hollywood Forever Cemetery in Los Angeles. In 2020 her fans organized a fundraiser and paid for a headstone to be placed.
