= Lawford Davidson =

British actor (1890–1964)

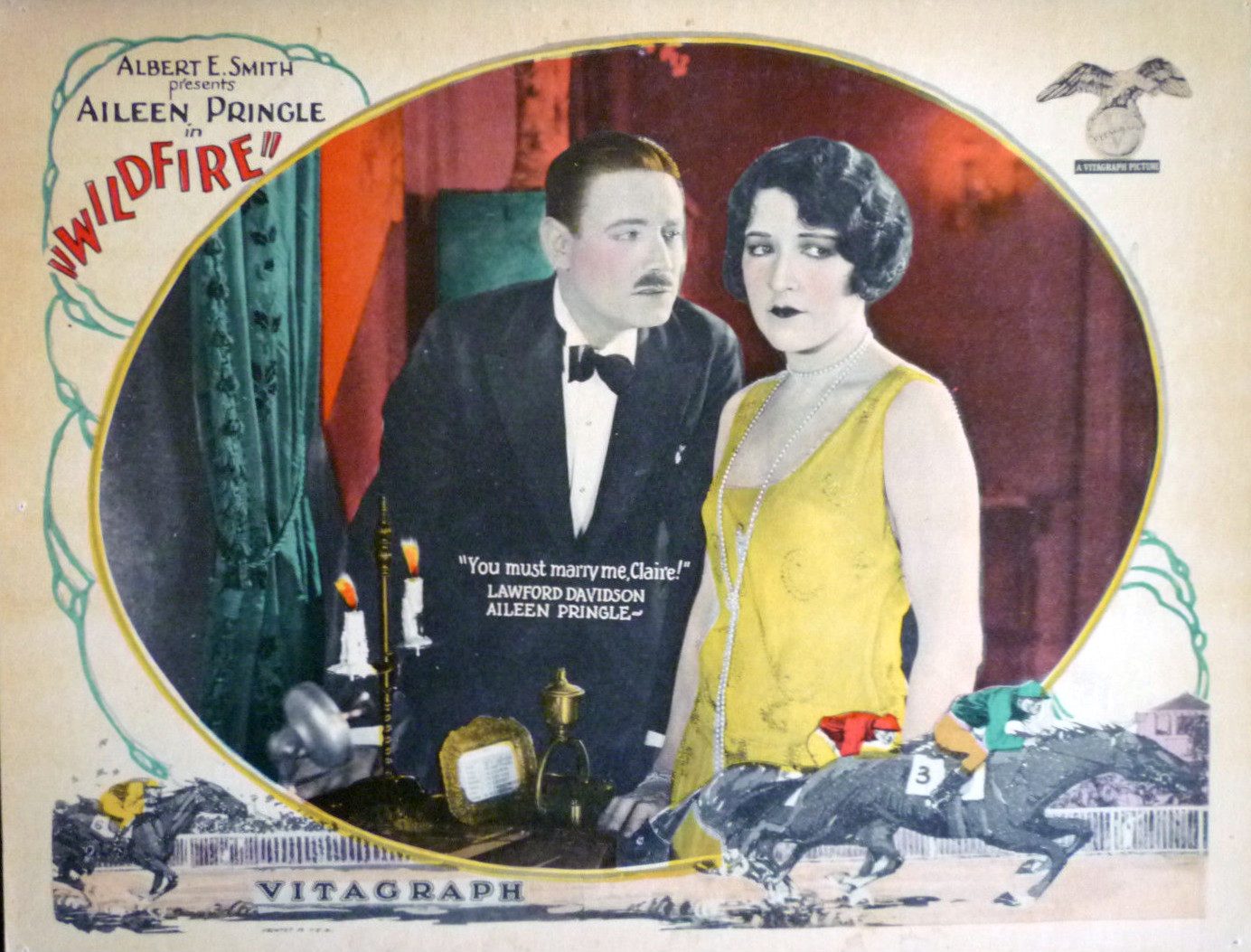
- Davidson and Aileen Pringle on lobby card for Wildfire (1925)
- Born: 1 January 1890; London, England
- Died: 1964 (aged 73–74); Bedford, Bedfordshire, England
- Occupation: Silent film actor

Lawford Davidson (1 January 1890 – 1964) was a British film actor.

He was born Charles Lawford Davidson in London and died in Bedford, Bedfordshire, England, at age 74. He was the first actor to dub another actor's voice, for Hungarian actor Paul Lukas in The Wolf of Wall Street (1929).

== Partial filmography ==
- The Garden of Resurrection (1919)
- The Lure of Crooning Water (1920)
- Duke's Son (1920)
- Testimony (1920)
- The Grass Orphan (1922)
- The Truants (1922)
- Half a Truth (1922)
- Running Water (1922)
- A Rogue in Love (1922)
- The Passionate Friends (1922)
- The Starlit Garden (1923)
- Constant Hot Water (1923)
- The Little Door Into the World (1923)
- The Great Well (1924)
- Love of Women (1924)
- Miami (1924)
- Playthings of Desire (1924)
- The Sky Raider (1925)
- Back to Life (1925)
- Wildfire (1925)
- Bright Lights (1925)
- The Mad Racer (1926)
- The Golden Web (1926)
- Sin Cargo (1926)
- College Days (1926)
- Marriage (1927)
- A Little Journey (1927)
- One Increasing Purpose (1927)
- The Patent Leather Kid (1927)
- Daredevil's Reward (1928)
- Burning Daylight (1928)
- Three-Ring Marriage (1928)
- George Washington Cohen (1928)
- The Love Doctor (1929)
- The Overland Telegraph (1929)
- The Mysterious Dr. Fu Manchu (1929)
- The Vagabond King (1930)
- Hell's Angels (1930)
