= Sailor's Holiday (1929 film) =

1929 film

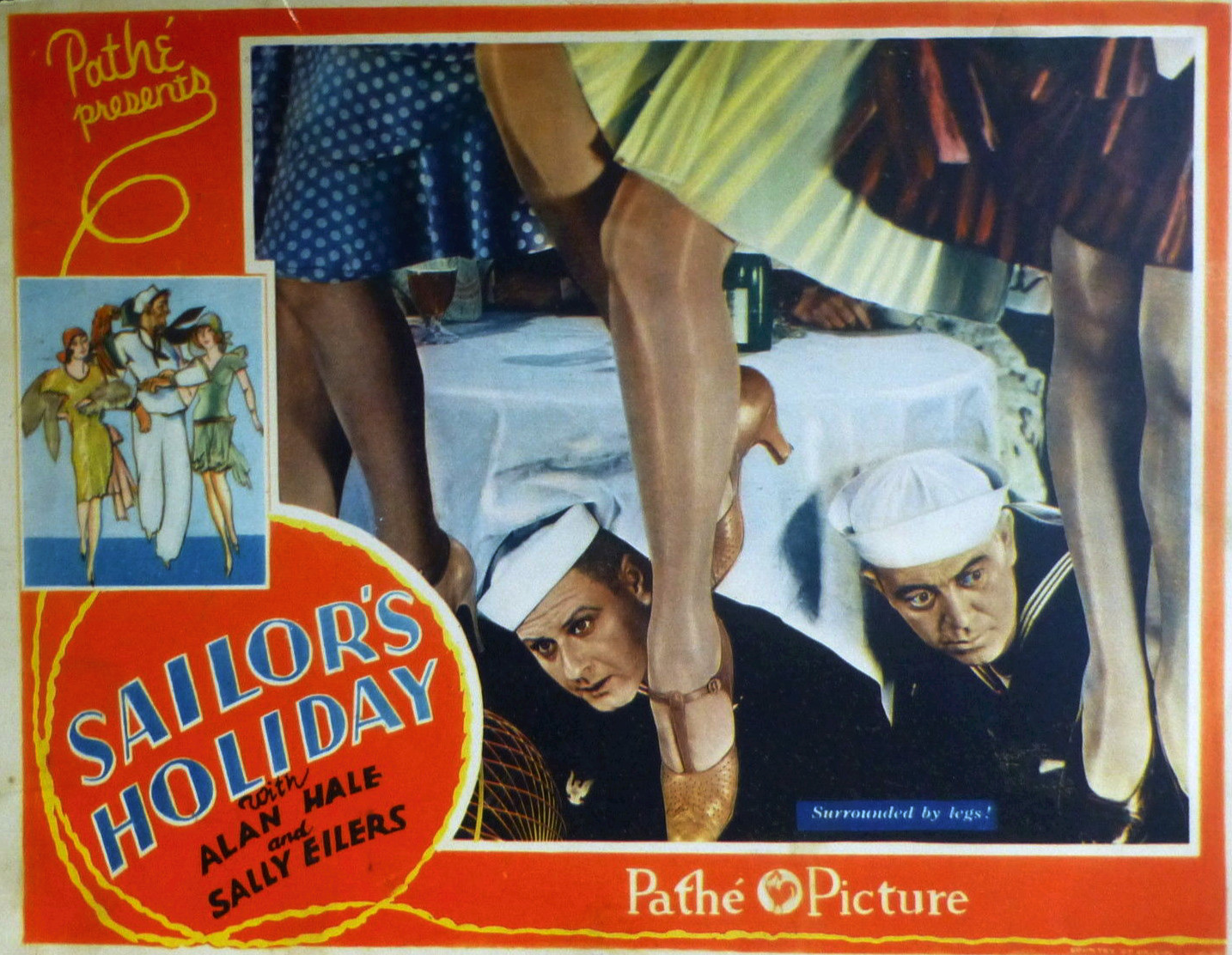
- Lobby card
- Directed by: Fred C. Newmeyer
- Written by: Ray Harris; Joseph F. Poland (screenplay, story)
- Produced by: Pathé Exchange
- Starring: Alan Hale; Sally Eilers; Mary Carr
- Cinematography: Arthur C. Miller
- Edited by: Claude Berkeley
- Distributed by: Pathé Exchange
- Release date: September 14, 1929
- Running time: 58 minutes
- Country: United States
- Language: English

Sailor's Holiday is a 1929 American pre-Code sound comedy film directed by Fred C. Newmeyer and produced and distributed by Pathé Exchange. The film was also released in a silent version.

== Plot ==
Based upon a review in a film magazine, the Captain of a battleship calls the crew aft to the fantail to announce their shore leave, with the mischievous sailors Adam Pike and Shorty looking forward to spending time at a Pacific amusement park, trying to avoid their nemesis, a boatswain's mate. They meet Molly Jones, who is looking for her brother, but after they also see a professional crier pulling the same gag, the boys think that Molly is also a phony. Adam has brought along his parrot. The bird is responsible for a rumpus in a restaurant that causes Molly to be taken as a pickpocket, although it is the two boys who have innocently pulled the pinch on the bos'n in one of their countless tricks in eluding him. Taking a taxi, they cruise around while Shorty watches the meter, knowing he has no cash in his pocket. Later the bos'n is found to be Sally's missing brother, and they end up in Mrs. Pike's diner for a fine home cooked meal.

== Cast ==
- Alan Hale as Adam Pike
- Sally Eilers as Molly Jones
- George Cooper as Shorty
- Paul Hurst as Jimmylegs
- Mary Carr as Mrs. Pike
- Charles Clary as Captain
- Jack Richardson as Captain
- Natalie Joyce as The Fast Worker
- Phil Sleeman as Her Secretary
- Ray Cooke as Sailor in Cafe (uncredited)
- Russ Powell as Midway Customer (uncredited)
- Randolph Scott as Undetermined Role (uncredited)
- Rolfe Sedan as Ferris Wheel Barker (uncredited)
- Slim Summerville as Midway Photographer (uncredited)
- Grady Sutton as Sailor Extra in Cafe (uncredited)

== Preservation ==
Sailor's Holiday is preserved at the Library of Congress.
