= Jack Pennick =

American actor (1895–1964)

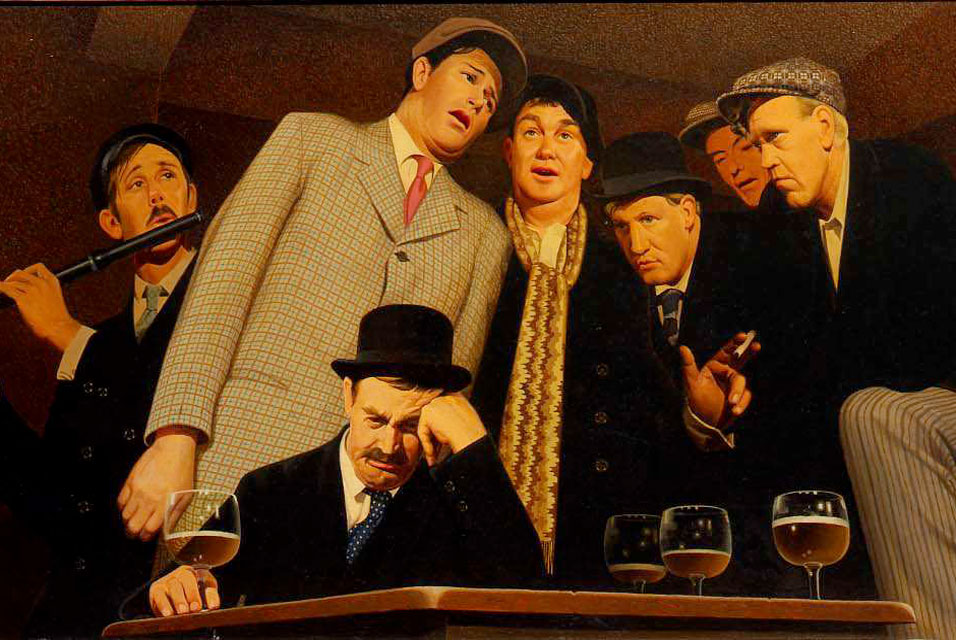
- 'Sentimental Ballad' by Grant Wood, 1940
- Born: Ronald Jack Pennick; December 7, 1895; Portland, Oregon, U.S.
- Died: August 16, 1964 (aged 68); Manhattan Beach, California, U.S.
- Occupation: Actor
- Years active: 1926–1962
- Spouse(s): Grechin Pennick (? – ?); Nona Lorraine (? – ?)
- Children: 3

Ronald Jack Pennick (December 7, 1895 – August 16, 1964) was an American film actor. After working as a gold miner as a young man, and serving as a U.S. Marine, he went on to appear in more than 140 films between 1926 and 1962. Pennick was a leading member to in the informal John Ford Stock Company, appearing in dozens of the director's films. Pennick also drilled the military extras in John Wayne's The Alamo (1960).

== Biography ==
Pennick was born in Portland, Oregon, the son of gold miner Albert R. and Bessie (Murray) Pennick. His first wife, Grechin, and he had two children by the time he was 20. He had a third child with his second wife, Nona Lorraine.

Pennick joined the U.S. Marine Corps, serving in China and World War I. In the 1920s, he worked as a horse wrangler on various film productions before he was noticed by filmmaker John Ford. He soon began working as an actor and military technical adviser.

He re-enlisted in the U.S. Navy in September 1941, at the age of 45. He was promoted to chief warrant officer (chief photographer) in December 1942. He served in the Field Photographic Unit for the Office of Strategic Services under the command of Ford, where he helped to drill and train new recruits in the unit. Pennick was awarded the Silver Star medal for action in North Africa.

He died in Manhattan Beach, California, at the age of 68.

== Selected filmography ==
- The Blue Eagle (1926) – Ship's Crewman (uncredited)
- What Price Glory? (1926) – Soldier (uncredited)
- The Broncho Twister (1927) – Jinx Johnson
- Paid to Love (1927) – Body Guard (uncredited)
- The Lone Eagle (1927) – Sven Linder
- Four Sons (1928) – The Iceman
- Why Sailors Go Wrong (1928) – First Mate (uncredited)
- Hangman's House (1928) – Man Bringing Dermot to Hanging (uncredited)
- Plastered in Paris (1928) – Bud Swenson
- Strong Boy (1929) – Baggage Man
- The Black Watch (1929) – 42nd Highlander (uncredited)
- Lucky Star (1929) – Army Driver (uncredited)
- Salute (1929) – Football Player (uncredited)
- The Virginian (1929) – Slim (uncredited)
- The Mighty (1929) – Doughboy (uncredited)
- Navy Blues (1929) – Kansas – Sailor (uncredited)
- His First Command (1929) – Rookie (uncredited)
- City Girl (1930) – Reaper (uncredited)
- Paramount on Parade (1930) – Marine (The Montmartre Girl) (uncredited)
- Born Reckless (1930) – Sergeant
- Way Out West (1930) – Pete
- Min and Bill (1930) – Merchant Seaman Checking in at Hotel (uncredited)
- Caught (1931) – Cavalryman (uncredited)
- Hell Divers (1931) – Mechanic Socked by Windy for Smoking (uncredited)
- Possessed (1931) – 'Parole for Convicts' Heckler (uncredited)
- Emma (1932) – Man at Railway Station Who Retrieves Emma's Corset (uncredited)
- The Beast of the City (1932) – Policeman #2 on Telephone (uncredited)
- Hell Fire Austin (1932) – Joe (uncredited)
- Sky Bride (1932) – Tom, Pilot (uncredited)
- Strangers of the Evening (1932) – Policeman (uncredited)
- The Phantom Express (1932) – Bubba, Henchman
- Heritage of the Desert (1932) – Fred (uncredited)
- Slightly Married (1932) – Sailor (uncredited)
- Air Mail (1932) – Airport Postal Worker (uncredited)
- If I Had a Million (1932) – Sailor with Violet (uncredited)
- Renegades of the West (1932) – Dave
- Wild Horse Mesa (1932) – Cowhand (uncredited)
- Sensation Hunters (1933) – Olaf Anderssen (uncredited)
- Hello, Everybody! (1933) – Joe, a Farmhand (uncredited)
- Mister Mugg (1933, Short)
- Strange People (1933) – The Plumber
- Pilgrimage (1933) – A Minute for Each Cedar Soldier (uncredited)
- Tugboat Annie (1933) – Pete
- Skyway (1933) – Spike
- I'm No Angel (1933) – Carny on spotlight (uncredited)
- Ace of Aces (1933) – Pilot (uncredited)
- The Prizefighter and the Lady (1933) – Bar Patron #6 (uncredited)
- Son of a Sailor (1933) – Sailor (uncredited)
- Jail Birds of Paradise (1934, Short) – Redface – Prisoner (uncredited)
- Come On Marines! (1934) – Cpl. Spike (uncredited)
- The World Moves On (1934) – French Orderly (uncredited)
- The Notorious Sophie Lang (1934) – Bystander (uncredited)
- Romance in Manhattan (1935) – Cab Driver on Strike (uncredited)
- West Point of the Air (1935) – Randolph Air Field Mechanic (uncredited)
- Goin' to Town (1935) – Cowboy (uncredited)
- Public Hero No. 1 (1935) – Bus Driver (uncredited)
- Don't Bet on Blondes (1935) – Gangster #1 (uncredited)
- The Farmer Takes a Wife (1935) – Man Waiting in Freight Office (uncredited)
- Steamboat Round the Bend (1935) – River Man with Pappy (uncredited)
- Navy Wife (1935) – Sailor (uncredited)
- Cappy Ricks Returns (1935) – Sailor (uncredited)
- Waterfront Lady (1935) – Ship Gambler (uncredited)
- Barbary Coast (1935) – Miner Chasing Chinese Man (uncredited)
- Hitch Hike Lady (1935) – Mug (uncredited)
- Rose Marie (1936) – Brawler (uncredited)
- The Prisoner of Shark Island (1936) – Corporal (uncredited)
- Drift Fence (1936) – Weary (uncredited)
- The Music Goes 'Round (1936) – Aspiring Actor (uncredited)
- Under Two Flags (1936) – Cpl. Vaux (uncredited)
- The Road to Glory (1936) – Soldier (uncredited)
- Private Number (1936) – Gus Rilovitch
- Come and Get It (1936) – Foreman (uncredited)
- Banjo on My Knee (1936) – Skipper of Small Launch (uncredited)
- The Plough and the Stars (1936) – (uncredited)
- Great Guy (1936) – Truck Driver (uncredited)
- Devil's Playground (1937) – Gob (uncredited)
- 23 1/2 Hours' Leave (1937) – Sgt. Johnson (uncredited)
- Wee Willie Winkie (1937) – Soldier (uncredited)
- Double or Nothing (1937) – Taxi Driver (uncredited)
- Big City (1937) – Ugly Comet Cab Driver (uncredited)
- Live, Love and Learn (1937) – Jonesie – Marine (uncredited)
- The Last Gangster (1937) – Convict in Mess Hall Riot (uncredited)
- Navy Blue and Gold (1937) – Ship's Fireman (uncredited)
- The Buccaneer (1938) – Bucktoothed Private (uncredited)
- King of the Newsboys (1938) – Lefty
- Tip-Off Girls (1938) – Truck Driver (uncredited)
- Battle of Broadway (1938) – Slim (uncredited)
- Yellow Jack (1938) – Soldier Who Once Had Yellow Jack (uncredited)
- Cocoanut Grove (1938) – Bus Driver (uncredited)
- Alexander's Ragtime Band (1938) – Drill Sergeant (uncredited)
- You and Me (1938) – Gangster
- Squadron of Honor (1938) – Elmer (uncredited)
- Submarine Patrol (1938) – Bos'un 'Guns' McPeek
- Thanks for Everything (1938) – Medical Sergeant (uncredited)
- Stagecoach (1939) – Bartender in Tonto (uncredited)
- Tail Spin (1939) – Mechanic (uncredited)
- Sergeant Madden (1939) – Prisoner (uncredited)
- Union Pacific (1939) – Harmonicist (uncredited)
- Young Mr. Lincoln (1939) – Big Buck Troop (uncredited)
- Mountain Rhythm (1939) – Rocky
- The Star Maker (1939) – Prizefighter
- Drums Along the Mohawk (1939) – Amos Hartman
- The Grapes of Wrath (1940) – Camp Helper (uncredited)
- The Westerner (1940) – Henry Willims (uncredited)
- The Long Voyage Home (1940) – Johnny
- North West Mounted Police (1940) – Sergeant Field
- Charter Pilot (1940) – Workman (uncredited)
- Tobacco Road (1941) – Deputy Sheriff (uncredited)
- Men of Boys Town (1941) – Reform School Guard (uncredited)
- Lady from Louisiana (1941) – Cuffy Brown
- Sergeant York (1941) – Corporal Cutting (uncredited)
- Wild Geese Calling (1941) – Mug (uncredited)
- How Green Was My Valley (1941) – Superintendent (uncredited)
- They Were Expendable (1945) – "Doc"
- My Darling Clementine (1946) – Stagecoach Driver (uncredited)
- Unconquered (1947) – Joe Lovat (uncredited)
- The Fugitive (1947) – Man (uncredited)
- Fort Apache (1948) – Sgt. Daniel Schattuck
- 3 Godfathers (1948) – Luke
- She Wore a Yellow Ribbon (1949) – Sergeant Major (uncredited)
- Mighty Joe Young (1949) – Sam, Truck Driver
- The Fighting Kentuckian (1949) – Captain Dan Carol
- When Willie Comes Marching Home (1950) – Sgt. Briggs – Instructor (uncredited)
- Rock Island Trail (1950) – Army Sergeant (uncredited)
- Rio Grande (1950) – Sergeant (uncredited)
- Tripoli (1950) – Busch
- Operation Pacific (1951) – Chief
- Fighting Coast Guard (1951) – Coast Guardsman
- The Sea Hornet (1951) – Salty
- What Price Glory (1952) – Ferguson (uncredited)
- Stars and Stripes Forever (1952) – Right Guard in Opening Scene (uncredited)
- The Sun Shines Bright (1953) – Beaker (uncredited)
- The Beast from 20,000 Fathoms (1953) – Jacob Bowman
- 20,000 Leagues Under the Sea (1954) – Cannon Mate Carson (uncredited)
- The Long Gray Line (1955) – Recruiting Sergeant (uncredited)
- Mister Roberts (1955) – Marine Sergeant
- The Last Frontier (1955) – Sergeant (uncredited)
- The Searchers (1956) – Sergeant at Fort
- The Wings of Eagles (1957) – Joe McGuffin (uncredited)
- The Last Hurrah (1958) – Police Sgt. Rafferty (uncredited)
- The Buccaneer (1958) – Yank Pirate
- The Horse Soldiers (1959) – Sgt. Major "Mitch" Mitchell (uncredited)
- Sergeant Rutledge (1960) – Courtroom Sgt. (uncredited)
- The Alamo (1960) – Sgt. Lightfoot (uncredited)
- Two Rode Together (1961) – Sergeant (uncredited)
- The Man Who Shot Liberty Valance (1962) – Jack-Bartender (uncredited)
- How The West Was Won (1962) – Captain Dan Carrol (uncredited)

== Television ==
- Wagon Train – episode – "The Colter Craven Story" – Drill Sgt. Tim Molley (uncredited) (1960)
- Gunslinger – episodes – "The Buried People", "Appointment in Cascabel", "The Zone", and "The Diehards" – Sgt. Duffy (1961)
