= Plastered in Paris =

1928 film

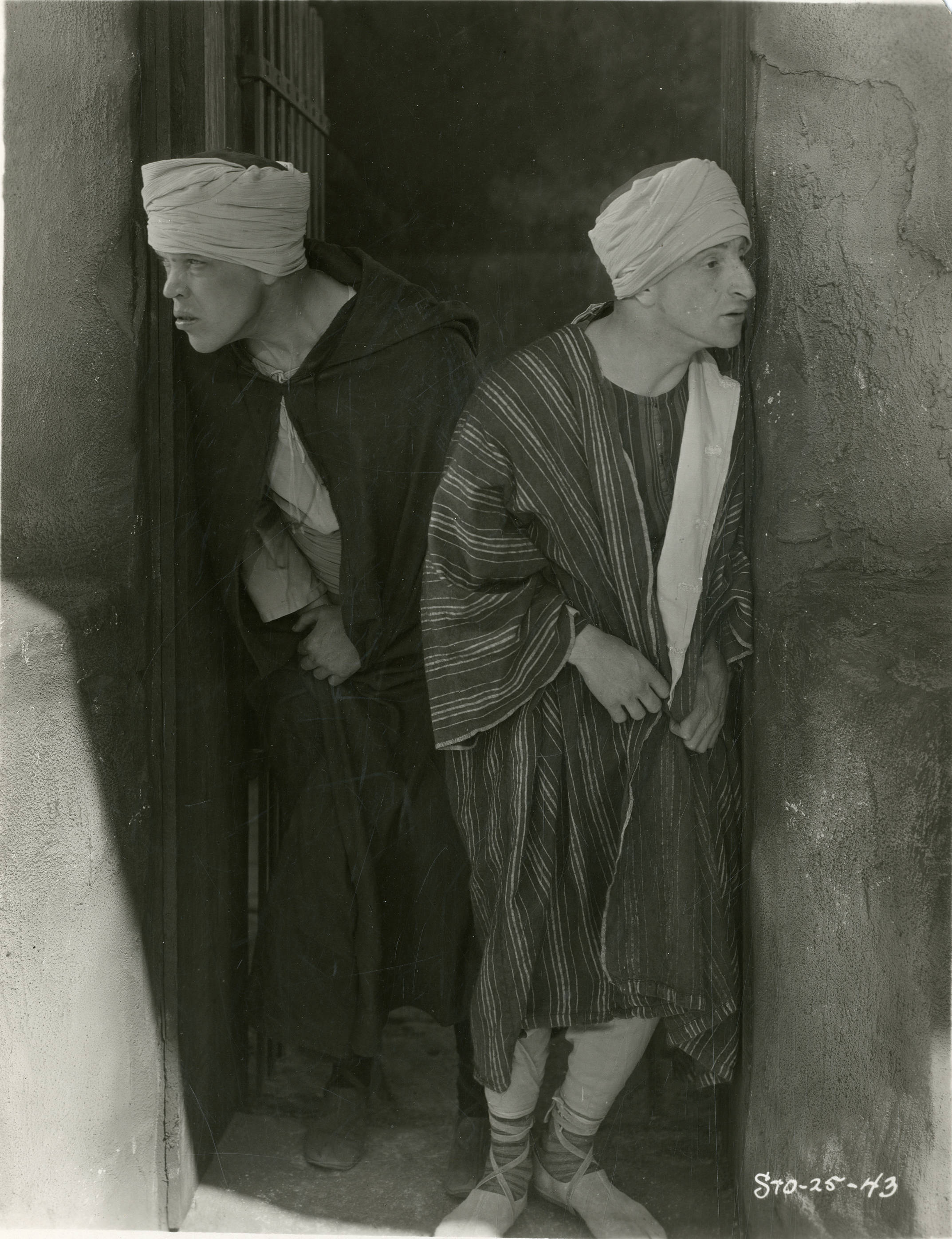
- Directed by: Benjamin Stoloff
- Written by: Malcolm Stuart Boylan; Harry Brand; Lou Breslow; Edwin J. Burke; Andrew Rice; Harry Sweet
- Starring: Sammy Cohen; Jack Pennick; Lola Salvi
- Cinematography: Charles G. Clarke
- Production company: Fox Film
- Distributed by: Fox Film
- Release date: September 23, 1928
- Running time: 62 minutes
- Country: United States
- Languages: Sound (Synchronized) (English Intertitles)

Plastered in Paris is a 1928 American synchronized sound comedy film directed by Benjamin Stoloff and starring Sammy Cohen, Jack Pennick and Lola Salvi.

While the film has no audible dialog, it was released with a synchronized musical score with sound effects using the sound-on-film movietone process. It was intended as a parody of Foreign Legion films such as Beau Geste. However, this drew some criticism for its mockery of the Foreign Legion, which an observer compared to the British Guards Regiments as being above parody.

In the film, two veterans of the American Legion enlist in the French Foreign Legion by mistake. They are assigned a mission in North Africa.

== Synopsis ==
The film opens on the Western Front in 1918, with Sammy Nosenblum (Sammy Cohen) and Bud Swenson (Jack Pennick) serving as American doughboys. In the trenches, Sammy’s oversized nose gets in the way when he tries to don his gas mask during a German attack. He’s gassed, and in the ensuing chaos, a falling rock strikes his head. When the smoke clears, we learn that Sammy’s war injury has left him with an uncontrollable urge to steal — a condition that would plague him for the next decade.

Ten years later, the American Legion convention brings Sammy and Bud back to Paris, city of their wartime memories. Bud hopes to find a French girl they both knew in 1918, while Sammy, still suffering from his compulsion, is reluctantly taken by Bud to a famed specialist in kleptomania (August Tollaire). The doctor's favored treatment involves a sharp slap to the face — which works only temporarily. In the specialist’s office, Sammy lifts a photograph from the doctor’s pocket, leading to the discovery that both men once courted the same young woman. When the doctor steps into his reception room, he finds his other patients — also kleptomaniacs — have stripped it of furniture.

The friends wander through Paris, meeting girls, including Marcelle (Lola Salvi), daughter of a French general (Michael Visaroff), and her suitor Hugh (Hugh Allan). They enter a lively café, where Sammy’s twitching fingers spark the film’s most famous gag: he impulsively yanks a stranger’s necktie. The affronted victim retaliates, setting off an epidemic of necktie-snatching that sweeps the entire café — customers sneak up behind strangers, dive across tables, and even duck behind pillars to grab scarves and cravats until the floor is littered with ties. In the confusion, Sammy and Bud are mistakenly arrested.

Instead of jail, the two find themselves shanghaied into the French Foreign Legion, their enlistment rubber-stamped before they know what’s happened. Shipped to North Africa, they run afoul of the towering drillmaster, Sergeant Cou-Cou (Ivan Linow), a parody of Beau Geste’s Sergeant Lejaune. Training sequences burlesque the Legion mythos, with Sammy repeatedly collapsing, tripping, and being hauled to his feet.

The plot turns when the general’s daughter, Marcelle, is kidnapped by the Riffians, led by chieftain Abou Ben Abed (Albert Conti). Sammy and Bud trail the captors into the desert, blundering into a Riffian village where they’re mistaken for magicians — and suspected of being French spies. The mob’s fury mounts, but the pair escape into the chieftain’s harem, where they discover not only Marcelle but also the spirited Mimi (Marion Byron).

To remain undetected, Sammy and Bud disguise themselves as veiled dancing girls. In the film’s most suggestive sequence, Sammy is summoned to the chieftain’s bedroom and performs a ridiculous “dance” atop the bed, flipping and somersaulting while trying to keep his veil in place. The chieftain reaches for him with amorous intent (“Come to Papa!”), but chaos erupts as Bud, the girls, and a mob of townspeople converge.

The final act is a frenzied escape sequence: Sammy, Bud, Marcelle, and Mimi race through corridors, tumble into an underground water chute, and slide into a canal, pulling a blanket over themselves to avoid detection. They commandeer a camel, then an automobile, and crash back into the Legion fort, delivering Marcelle to her father. The general hails them as heroes; Marcelle thanks Hugh, and Sammy tries to steal a moment — and perhaps a kiss — for himself.

The comedy closes with Cou-Cou looming over Sammy, Sammy’s imagination transforming the sergeant into a grinning devil in double exposure, and a final fade-out.

== Cast ==
- Sammy Cohen as Sammy Nosenblum
- Jack Pennick as Bud Swenson
- Lola Salvi as Marcelle
- Ivan Linow as Sergeant Cou Cou
- Hugh Allan as Hugh
- Marion Byron as Mimi
- Michael Visaroff as French General
- Albert Conti as Abou Ben Abed
- August Tollaire as Doctor

== Production ==
A large portion of Plastered in Paris was shot on location at Cedar City.

== See also ==
- List of early sound feature films (1926–1929)

== Bibliography ==
- Solomon, Aubrey. The Fox Film Corporation, 1915-1935: A History and Filmography. McFarland, 2011.
- Lee Grieveson & Peter Kramer. The Silent Cinema Reader. Psychology Press, 2004.
