= Carl Miller (actor) =

American actor (1894–1979)

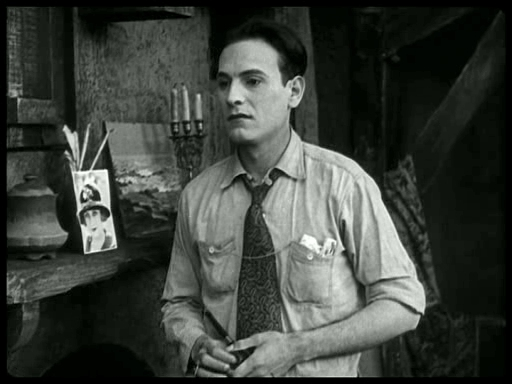
- Miller as "The Man" in The Kid (1921)
- Born: August 9, 1894; Wichita County, Texas
- Died: January 20, 1979 (aged 84); Honolulu, Hawaii
- Occupation: Actor

Carl Miller (August 9, 1894 – January 20, 1979) was an American film actor. He appeared in 48 films from 1917 to 1942, including roles in two Charlie Chaplin films: The Kid (1921) and A Woman of Paris (1923).

He was born in Wichita County, Texas and died in Honolulu, Hawaii.

== Selected filmography ==
- The Doctor and the Woman (1918)
- The Kid (1921)
- Cinderella of the Hills (1921)
- Condemned (1923)
- A Woman of Paris (1923)
- Jealous Husbands (1923)
- The Lover of Camille (1924)
- The Redeeming Sin (1925)
- The Red Kimona (1925)
- The Wall Street Whiz (1925)
- The Great K & A Train Robbery (1926)
- Raggedy Rose (1926)
- The Power of the Weak (1926)
- Whispering Sage (1927)
- Why Sailors Go Wrong (1928)
- Making the Varsity (1928)
- Traveling Husbands (1931)
- Honor of the Family (1931)
- Renegades of the West (1932)
- No Ransom (1934)
- The Plainsman (1936, uncredited)
- Lawless Valley (1938, uncredited)
- In Old California (1942, uncredited)
