= The Power of the Weak =

1926 film

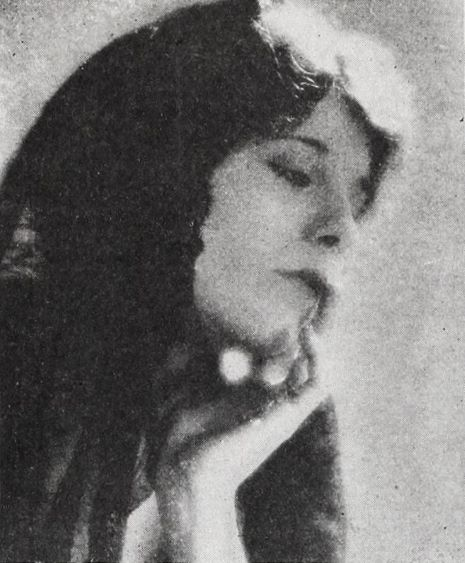
- Still with Calhoun
- Directed by: William James Craft
- Written by: William James Craft; Wyndham Gittens
- Produced by: I.E. Chadwick
- Starring: Alice Calhoun; Carl Miller; Spottiswoode Aitken
- Cinematography: Arthur Reeves
- Production company: Chadwick Pictures
- Distributed by: Chadwick Pictures
- Release date: May 24, 1926
- Running time: 7 reels
- Country: United States
- Language: Silent (English intertitles)

The Power of the Weak is a 1926 American silent drama film directed by William James Craft and starring Alice Calhoun, Carl Miller, and Spottiswoode Aitken.

== Cast ==
- Alice Calhoun as Myra
- Carl Miller as Raymond
- Spottiswoode Aitken as The Father
- Arnold Gray as Raymond Bradford
- Marguerite Clayton
- J.C. Fowler

== Bibliography ==
- Darby, William. Masters of Lens and Light: A Checklist of Major Cinematographers and Their Feature Films. Scarecrow Press, 1991. ISBN 0-8108-2454-X
