= Mister Mugg =

1933 film

- Directed by: James W. Horne
- Written by: James W. Horne; J. A. Howe
- Produced by: Warren Doane
- Starring: James Gleason; Dorothy Christy
- Distributed by: Universal Pictures
- Release date: May 10, 1933
- Running time: 20 minutes
- Country: United States
- Language: English

Mister Mugg is a 1933 short American pre-Code comedy film directed by James W. Horne. It was nominated for an Academy Award at the 6th Academy Awards in 1933 for Best Short Subject (Comedy). The Academy Film Archive preserved Mister Mugg in 2012.

== Cast ==
- James Gleason
- Dorothy Christy
- Ben Alexander
- Otis Harlan
- Jack Pennick
- Fred Warren
