= Charles Morton (actor) =

American actor

- Publicity shot, 1927
- Born: January 28, 1908; Illinois, U.S.
- Died: October 26, 1966 (aged 58); North Hollywood, California, U.S.
- Occupation(s): Theatre, film, television actor
- Years active: 1927–1964

Charles Morton (28 January 1908 in Illinois, USA – 26 October 1966 in North Hollywood, California) was an American actor.

== Career ==
Born in Illinois, Charles Morton spent his adolescence in Madison, Wisconsin; receiving his education at Madison High School and the University of Wisconsin–Madison. He made his first stage appearance at the age of seven and later appeared in vaudeville, stock and the legitimate stage. Morton's career started late in the silent era, first as a leading man, continued into sound features and finally television.

His polished physical appearance, charm and personality were noted by the studios and at the age of 19 signed his first contract with Fox in 1927. Audiences first discovered the handsome youth that same year opposite the studio's leading flapper, Madge Bellamy, in Colleen, one of the era's many comedy-dramas.

Morton went on to star in John Ford's 1928 World War I silent film Four Sons. Morton was also a member of the ultimately tragic circus troupe in F. W. Murnau's near-classic 4 Devils, among the most mourned of the lost films of the silent era. Morton also starred in Fox's None but the Brave (1928).

In 1931, Morton married Lya Lys, but the marriage ended in divorce some months later, not long after the birth of their daughter. Later a dispute over alimony payments would see Morton spending a few days behind bars.

After 1933 with the widespread use of sound film, Morton's career began to lose momentum; and by 1936 his roles were significantly reduced, playing minor roles on television until his death from heart disease in 1966. Even though Morton's career continued into the mid-1960s, almost all of his roles after 1933 were so minor he was left uncredited for the majority of his performances.

He died at the age of 58, was cremated and his ashes interred in an unmarked grave in Valhalla Memorial Park, North Hollywood, Los Angeles County, California, in Block G, Section 6755, Lot 1.

== Partial filmography ==
- Rich But Honest (1927)
- Wolf Fangs (1927)
- Colleen (1927)
- Dressed to Kill (1928)
- None but the Brave (1928)
- Four Sons (1928)
- 4 Devils (1928)
- New Year's Eve (1929)
- Check and Double Check (1930)
- Caught Short (1930)
- The Dawn Trail (1930)
- The Last Ride (1931)
- Goldie Gets Along (1932)
- Gunsmoke 1964 TV Series - "Crooked Mile" (S10E2) - Barfly
