= The Monkey Talks (film) =

1927 film by Raoul Walsh

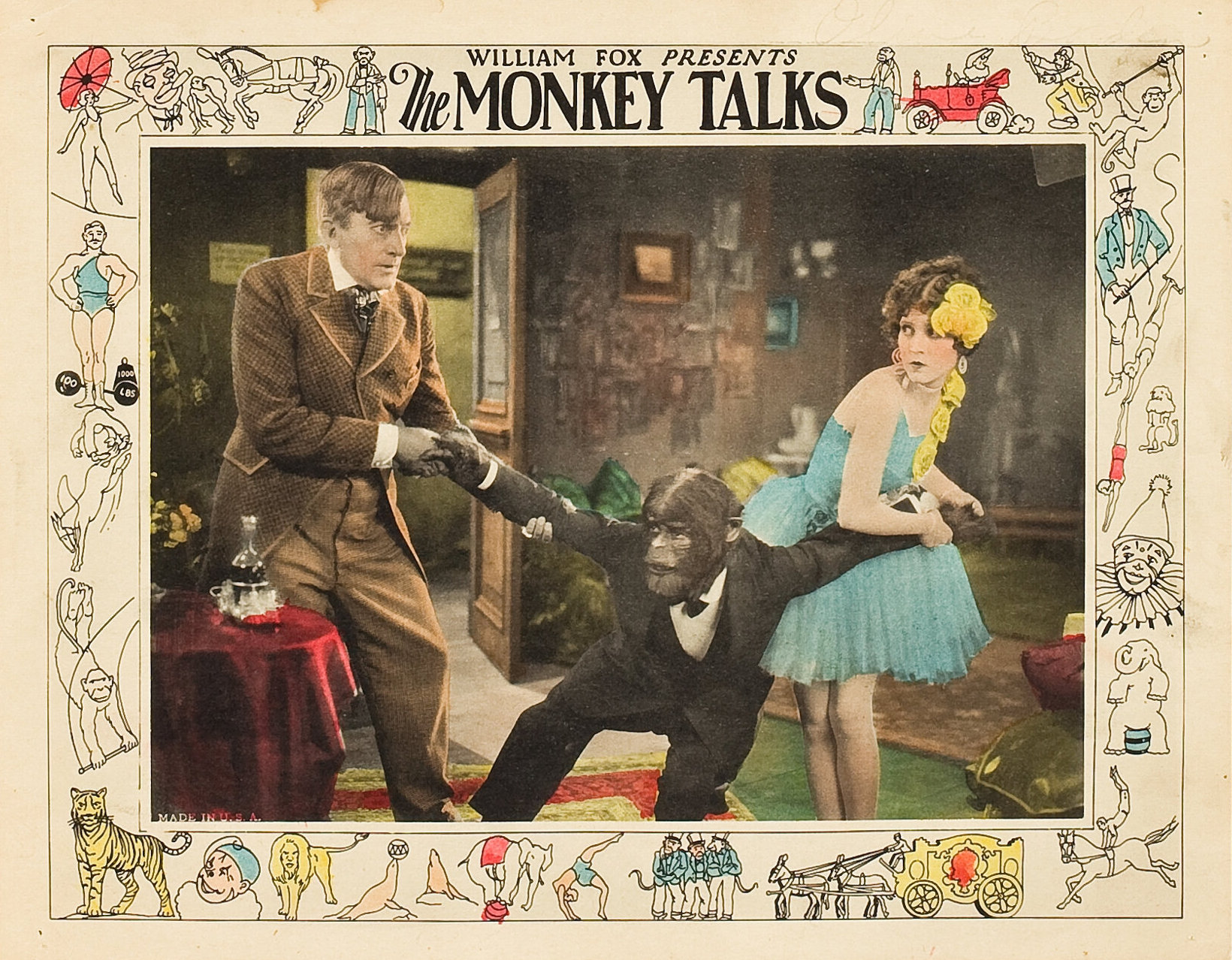
- Lobby card for the film
- Directed by: Raoul Walsh
- Screenplay by: Malcolm Stuart Boylan; Elizabeth Pickett Chevalier
- Based on: Le Singe qui parle by René Fauchois
- Starring: Olive Borden; Jacques Lerner; Don Alvarado; Malcolm Waite
- Cinematography: L. William O'Connell
- Edited by: Rose Smith
- Production company: Fox Film Corporation
- Distributed by: Fox Film Corporation
- Release date: February 20, 1927
- Running time: 60 minutes
- Country: United States
- Language: Silent (English intertitles)

The Monkey Talks is a 1927 American silent drama film directed by Raoul Walsh and written by Malcolm Stuart Boylan and Elizabeth Pickett Chevalier. The film stars Olive Borden, Jacques Lerner, Don Alvarado, Malcolm Waite, Raymond Hitchcock, and Ted McNamara. Based on the play Le Singe qui parle by René Fauchois, the film was released on February 20, 1927, by Fox Film Corporation.

== Cast ==
- Olive Borden as Olivette
- Jacques Lerner as Jocko Lerner
- Don Alvarado as Sam Wick
- Malcolm Waite as Bergerin
- Raymond Hitchcock as Lorenzo
- Ted McNamara as Firmin
- Jane Winton as Masisie
- August Tollaire as Mata

== Preservation ==
A 35 mm print of the film is held by George Eastman House.
