= Why Sailors Go Wrong =

1928 film

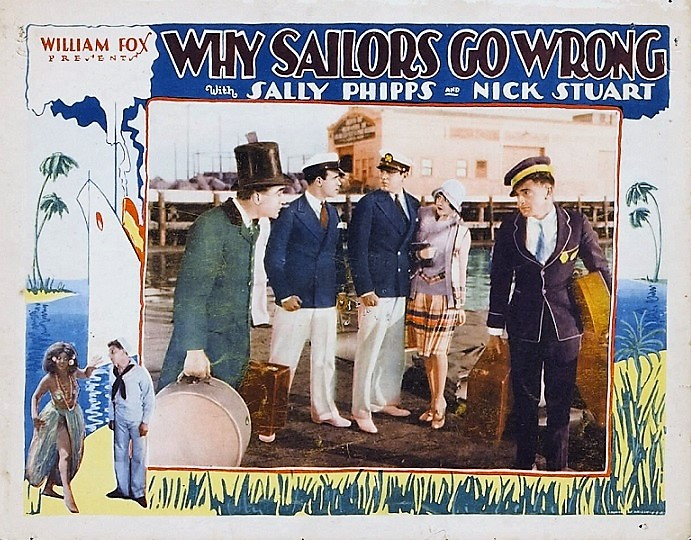
- Lobby card
- Directed by: Henry Lehrman
- Screenplay by: Randall Faye; Delos Sutherland
- Story by: William M. Conselman; Frank O'Connor
- Starring: Sammy Cohen; Ted McNamara; Sally Phipps; Nick Stuart; E. H. Calvert; Carl Miller
- Cinematography: Sidney Wagner
- Edited by: Ralph Dietrich
- Production company: Fox Film Corporation
- Distributed by: Fox Film Corporation
- Release date: March 25, 1928
- Running time: 60 minutes
- Country: United States
- Language: Silent (English intertitles)
- Budget: $46,000

Why Sailors Go Wrong is a 1928 American silent comedy film directed by Henry Lehrman and written by Randall Faye and Delos Sutherland. The film stars Sammy Cohen, Ted McNamara, Sally Phipps, Nick Stuart, E. H. Calvert, and Carl Miller. The film was released on March 25, 1928, by the Fox Film Corporation.

== Cast ==
- Sammy Cohen as Sammy Beezeroff
- Ted McNamara as Angus McAxle
- Sally Phipps as Betty Green
- Nick Stuart as Jimmy Collier
- E. H. Calvert as Cyrus Green
- Carl Miller as John Dunning
- Jules Cowles as Native (uncredited)
- Noble Johnson as Native (uncredited)
- Jack Pennick as First Mate (uncredited)
- Russ Powell as Native Chieftain (uncredited)

== Production ==
The film was originally made by Frank O'Connor at a cost of $110,000. It was completed, but this was scrapped. The film was remade by director Henry Lehrman at a cost of $46,000.

== Preservation ==
A print of Why Sailors Go Wrong is held by the George Eastman Museum.
