= Arthur "Bugs" Baer =

American cartoonist

Arthur Baer
- Baer in 1930
- Born: January 9, 1886; Philadelphia, Pennsylvania, U.S.
- Died: May 17, 1969 (aged 83); New York City, New York, U.S.
- Other name: Bugs Baer
- Occupations: Journalist, humorist

Arthur "Bugs" Baer (January 9, 1886 - May 17, 1969) was an American journalist, sportswriter, and humorist—widely credited with coining the nickname “Sultan of Swat” for Babe Ruth. Baer who often included his own cartoons with his articles.

He was known for his clever, sometimes suggestive, quips, such as one praising pitcher Allen Sothoron: "Allan S. Sothoron pitched his initials off today."

== Early life ==
Baer was born in Philadelphia, Pennsylvania, the seventh of 14 children born to immigrants from Alsace-Lorraine. He left school at age 14 to work, attended art school, and designed lace on a wage of $12 a week. One article from 1918 lists Baer as a notable graduate of the Field Artillery Officers' Training School in Camp Zachary Taylor. Baer also contributed to the 1919 book F.A.C.O.T.S. - The Story of the Field Artillery Central Officers Training School.

A 1921 article shows that Baer played on the New York Newspaper Golf Club team in an intercity New York-Boston journalists' golf match.

== Career ==
Baer began his career in journalism as an artist with the Philadelphia Public Ledger and later worked for other papers before working as a sports journalist for the Washington Times, where he drew cartoons of a "baseball-bodied insect" named "Bugs." Baer was thereafter known as "Bugs," insisting upon being referred to by this nickname. One of his famous jokes involved Gavvy Cravath, a Phillies player who, on June 23, 1919, was caught attempting to steal second base. Baer quipped that "his head was sure full of larceny, but his feet were honest." –a joke that amused William Randolph Hearst so much that he hired Baer to work for the New York American.

Baer was active on Broadway in the 1920s. Among his many credits, he co-authored the third "George White's Scandals" review in 1923, with George White as writer and George Gershwin as a composer. For the new motion picture industry, he wrote the only movie for Babe Ruth in which Ruth played himself. As a ghostwriter, he wrote the continuity for the Mutt and Jeff comic strip for two years in the 1920s. He also served as emcee for various appearances and shows by the syndicated newspaper cartoonists.

== Personal life ==
Baer married twice. His first wife, Marjorie Cassidy, died from typhoid fever two years after their first Arthura "Atra" was born. His second wife, Louise Andrews, mother of his son, Arthur Bugs Baer, Jr., was a Ziegfeld Follies girl who became one of the first fund-raisers for heart disease research. She was president-elect of the American Heart Association on her death from heart illness in 1950.

Baer rubbed elbows with the likes of Marilyn Monroe, Lou Gehrig, Milton Berle, Bob Considine, Jack Dempsey, and more. He was friends with the likes of Gershwin, the great comedian and entertainer Ed Sullivan, cartoonist George McManus, crusty columnist Damon Runyon, and Robert Ripley of "Ripley's Believe It or Not!" amongst many others. Ripley was a close friend to the end, punctuated by Baer serving as pal bearer at Ripley's funeral. Baer became a regular at the midtown speakeasy "Club Intime" run by the larger-than-life hostess Texas Guinan (known her signature greeting to patrons, "Hello Sucker!"

Baer died at age 83 at New York Hospital on May 17, 1969. He was survived by his daughter Atra Cavataro nee Baer and son, Arthur Bugs Baer, Jr., as well as seven grandchildren.

Atra was a gifted musician, journalist, and speech writer. She also penned screenplays, songs and operas. She was the goddaughter of New York City Mayor James J. "Jimmy" Walker. Atra was a reporter for the Journal American newspaper for close to 30 years, often collaborating with other editorial staff, including Ed Sullivan, Dorothy Kilgallen, Jimmy Breslin, and Jack O'Brien. Friend and retired New York Times writer Rita Reif recalls Atra as being "the most gifted writer at the Journal-American - and that's saying a lot because her father also worked there." Atra interviewed the likes of Elvis Presley, Shirley Temple, Marilyn Monroe, Judy Garland, and Chubby Checker. In 1967, Atra was a two-day champion on the then nascent television program "Jeopardy!" She went on to be a speechwriter for three New York City mayors, including Abe Beame, David Dinkins, and Ed Koch, the later for his 12 years in office. Mayor Koch was often heard in his office exclaiming, "let's give them another funny one, Atra!" referring to the speeches she would pen for him.

Bugs Jr. graduated from Harvard College and Harvard Business School and became an investment manager, venture capitalist, and yacht racer.
