= Ted McNamara =

Australian actor (1894–1928)

Edward Joseph McNamara
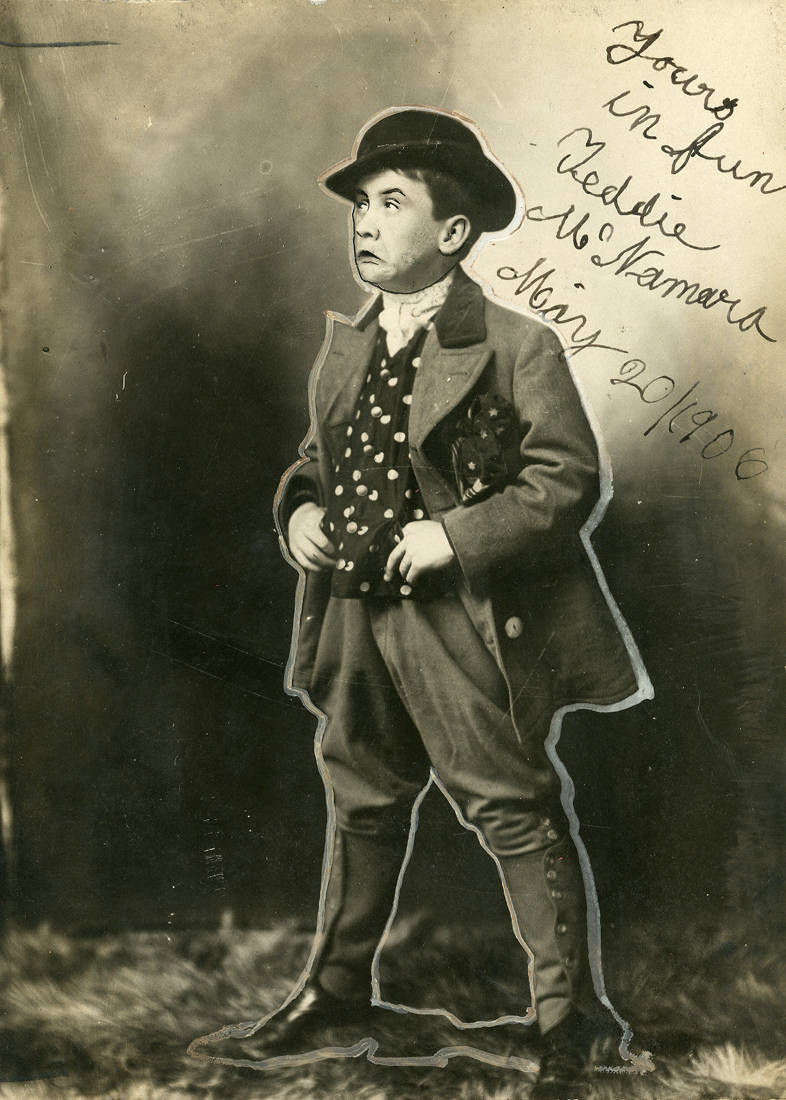
- McNamara in 1906
- Born: 19 September 1894; Melbourne, Australia
- Died: February 1928 (aged 33); Los Angeles, California, U.S.

Edward Joseph McNamara (19 September 1894 – February 1928) was an Australian vaudevillian who made a career on stage in Australia, the United States, and in Hollywood silent films before dying suddenly in 1928. At various times he has credited as Ted McNamara, Teddy McNamara, and Teddie McNamara.

== Biography ==
McNamara was born in Melbourne, Australia. As a juvenile, he appeared on stage in numerous productions while travelling Australia and New Zealand, with great acclaim. In 1905, he joined a long tour by Pollard's Lilliputian Opera Company through Japan, China, Canada and the US, the company achieving considerable renown.

He married former company member and Australian actress Phyllis Hill in Canada in 1913, while both were underage. She returned to Australia in 1915, obtaining a divorce nine years later, in 1926, on the grounds of desertion. There was one child of the union. McNamara continued to perform in North America, including on Broadway through 1922–1924.

In 1926, Raoul Walsh teamed him with fellow comedian Sammy Cohen for supporting character roles in the war film What Price Glory? As a comedy duo, McNamara and Cohen would appear together in several films.

He died of pneumonia in early 1928. Many of the former Pollard's performers living in Hollywood attended the funeral, including Alf Goulding, Billy Bevan, Snub Pollard, and Daphne Pollard. He had remarried by this time.

== Filmography ==
- Shore Leave (1925)
- What Price Glory? (1926) (with Sammy Cohen)
- The Monkey Talks (1927)
- Upstream (1927)
- Rich But Honest (1927)
- Colleen (1927) (with Sammy Cohen)
- Chain Lightning (1927)
- The Gay Retreat (1927) (with Sammy Cohen)
- The Gateway of the Moon (1928)
- Mother Machree (1928)
- Why Sailors Go Wrong (1928) (with Sammy Cohen)
