= Homesick (1928 film) =

1928 film

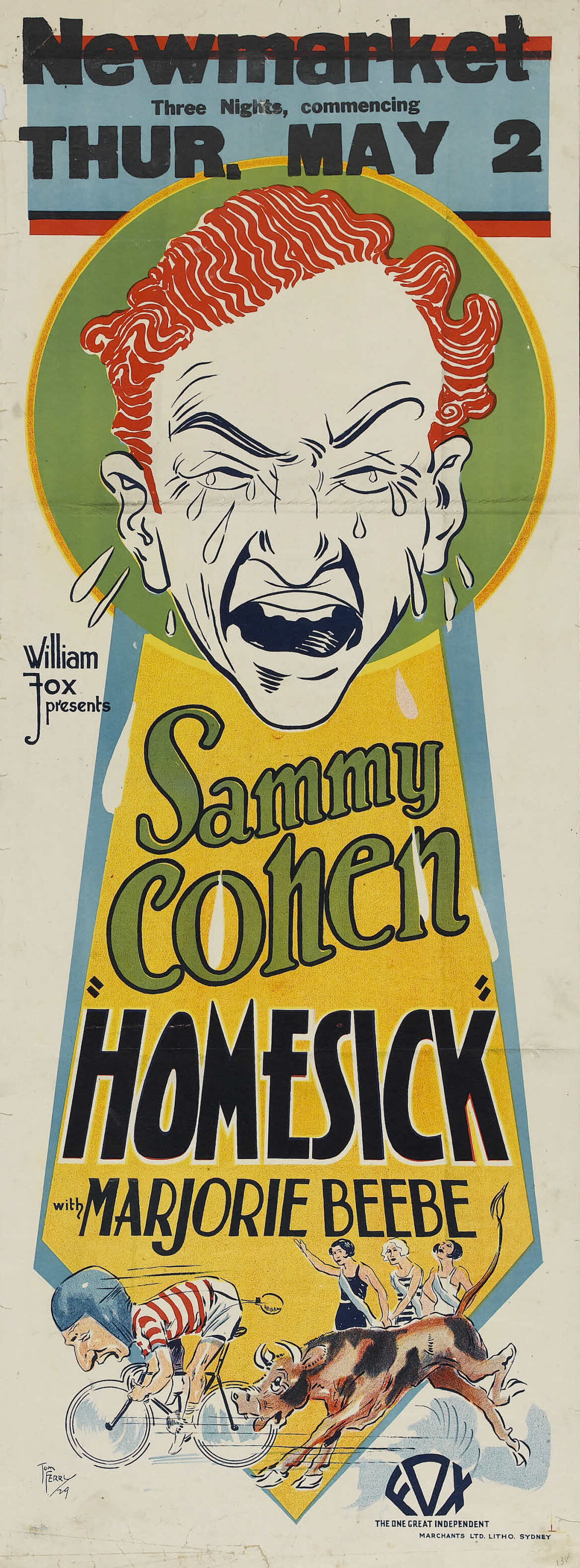
- Poster
- Directed by: Henry Lehrman
- Screenplay by: John Stone; William Kernell
- Story by: John Stone
- Starring: Sammy Cohen; Harry Sweet; Marjorie Beebe; Henry Armetta; Pat Harmon
- Cinematography: Charles Van Enger
- Edited by: Ralph Dixon
- Production company: Fox Film Corporation
- Distributed by: Fox Film Corporation
- Release date: December 16, 1928
- Running time: 55 minutes
- Country: United States
- Languages: Sound (Synchronized) (English Intertitles)

Homesick is a 1928 American synchronized sound comedy film directed by Henry Lehrman and written by John Stone and William Kernell. While the film has no audible dialog, it was released with a synchronized musical score with sound effects using the sound-on-film movietone process. The film stars Sammy Cohen, Harry Sweet, Marjorie Beebe, Henry Armetta, and Pat Harmon. The film was released on December 16, 1928, by Fox Film Corporation.

== Plot ==
In a small California town, Babe (played by Marjorie Beebe), a sweet and lonely servant girl, dreams of escaping her solitary life. Hoping to find love and security, she places a newspaper advertisement seeking a husband—someone kind-hearted and solvent enough to help her buy a chicken ranch. She mails the letter, unaware of the chaos it will unleash.

Thousands of miles away in New York City, Sammy Schnable (played by Sammy Cohen), a fast-talking but broke young man with more nerve than money, comes across Babe’s ad. Struck by her photo and charmed by her words, he instantly decides she’s the girl for him. But with no job, no funds, and no prospects, Sammy has to get creative.

Seeing a chance to raise quick money, Sammy joins a two-day poker game, staking his last dime. Across the table is Ambrose (played by Harry Sweet), a fellow hustler and Sammy’s frenemy, who also reads Babe’s ad and develops the same plan. After a marathon of bluffing and bad luck, Ambrose loses heavily to Sammy, who now has just enough money to buy a bicycle and enter a cross-country race to California with a $25,000 grand prize.

Angry and suspicious, Ambrose signs up for the race too—intent on winning both the money and Babe.

Thus begins the madcap, transcontinental bicycle race, with Sammy and Ambrose at the center of a comedic storm. Alongside them are a host of eccentric cyclists, including an exuberant Italian (played by Henry Armetta) and a competitive Polish rider (played by Pat Harmon). The race quickly turns into a rolling battlefield of sabotage and slapstick.

As the contestants roll westward, Sammy and Ambrose’s antics escalate. In one segment, they’re seen working as window washers on a high-rise, teetering on ladders and ropes, flinging water and insults at each other. Later, they sneak aboard a train—Sammy still clutching Babe’s photo—to skip part of the route. Their schemes backfire repeatedly, resulting in physical comedy, pratfalls, and bruised egos.

In one of the most memorable sequences, Ambrose causes a stampede of wild cattle while trying to cheat ahead in an automobile. Sammy, caught in the chaos, is chased by the herd and ends up hanging from a tree branch, pantsless, before escaping with his dignity barely intact.

As the race continues through blistering desert, Sammy and Ambrose stumble through heatwaves and mirages, exchanging punchy dialogue and enduring one comic setback after another. At one point, they collapse in the sand, hallucinating oases and blaming each other for their misfortunes.

Back in California, Babe receives a letter proclaiming Sammy as the race’s frontrunner. Thrilled, she prepares to meet him. But Ambrose, having skipped ahead again, reaches her first and falsely presents himself as the winner—and as the man who answered her ad. Babe is initially flattered, though confused by Ambrose’s awkward manner.

Soon after, the real Sammy arrives in town to cheering crowds and is welcomed as the race’s true victor. He finally meets Babe face to face. Their chemistry is instant and sincere, but the reunion is disrupted when Ambrose returns to stir up trouble and reclaim his false prize.

The final act is a whirlwind of farcical misunderstandings and confrontations. At a party meant to honor the race’s winner—and possibly celebrate a wedding—Ambrose crashes in and sets off a string of comic mishaps. A tiered cake is upended, couples are mismatched, and Sammy finds himself flat on the floor more than once in his attempt to propose.

In the climax, amid a flurry of accusations, flung insults, and slapstick brawls, Babe learns the truth: Sammy is the man who rode every mile, won the race, and answered her letter with genuine heart. Ambrose’s trickery is exposed, and he slinks away in defeat.

Sammy and Babe, now united, embrace their hard-won happiness. With the prize money in hand, Sammy offers to fulfill Babe’s dream: they’ll start a new life together—on a chicken ranch, just as she’d hoped.

== Cast ==
- Sammy Cohen as Sammy Schnable
- Harry Sweet as Ambrose
- Marjorie Beebe as Babe
- Henry Armetta as Bicycle Rider
- Pat Harmon as Polish Bicycle Rider

== See also ==
- List of early sound feature films (1926–1929)
