= Sammy Cohen =

American film actor and comedian

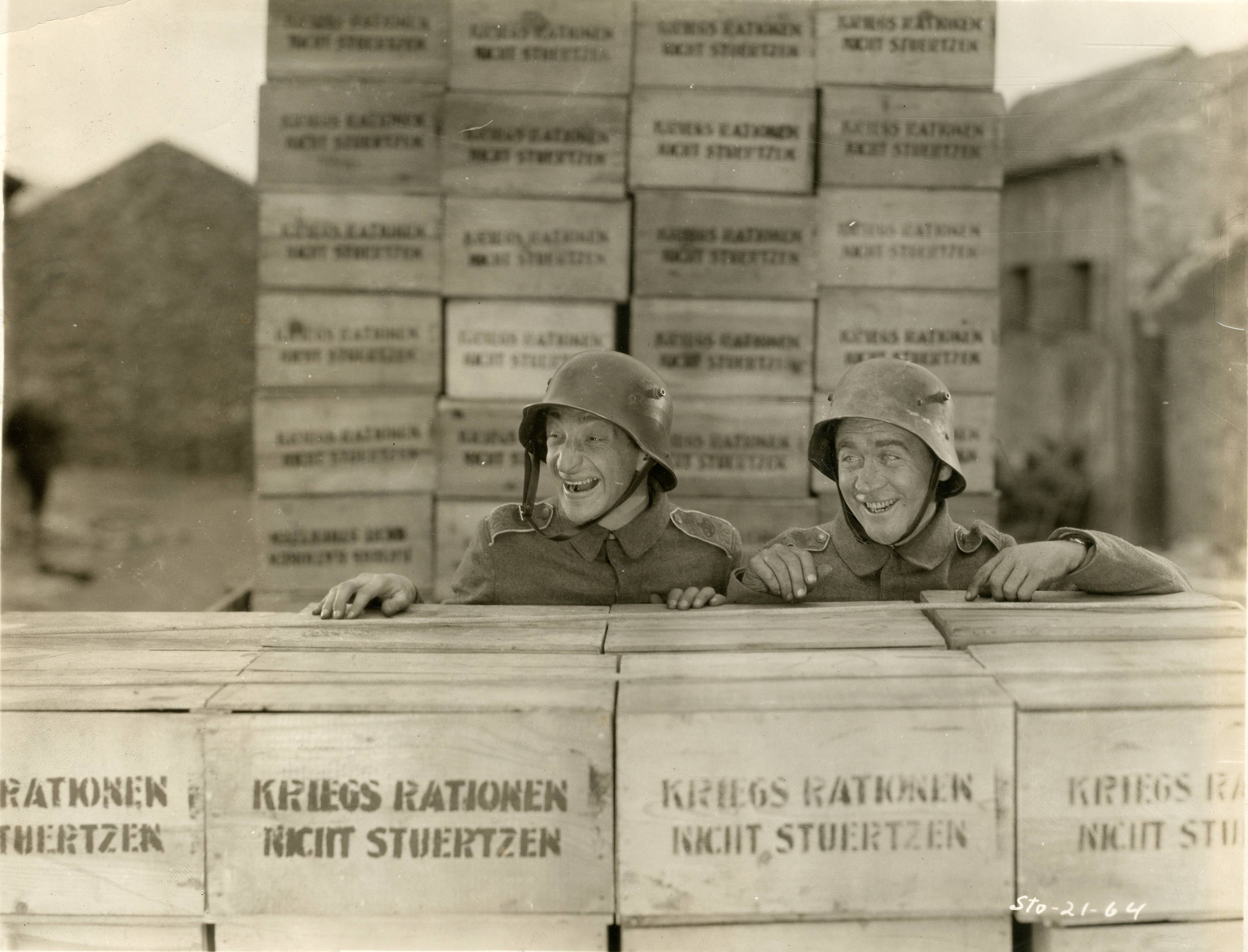
- Still from The Gay Retreat (1927) with Sammy Cohen and Ted McNamara
- Born: December 8, 1902; Minneapolis, Minnesota, United States
- Died: May 30, 1981 (aged 78); Santa Monica, California, United States
- Occupation: Actor
- Years active: 1926-1946 (film)

Sammy Cohen (December 8, 1902– May 30, 1981) was an American film actor and comedian. He was one of several popular Jewish comedians acting in films during the late 1920s. He was teamed with Ted McNamara as a comedy duo in the films What Price Glory? (1926), Colleen (1927), The Gay Retreat (1927), and Why Sailors Go Wrong (1928).

== Selected filmography ==
- The Skyrocket (1926)
- The Great K & A Train Robbery (1926)
- The Return of Peter Grimm (1926)
- What Price Glory? (1926)
- The Auctioneer (1927)
- Upstream (1927)
- Cradle Snatchers (1927)
- Colleen (1927)
- The Gay Retreat (1927)
- Why Sailors Go Wrong (1928)
- Homesick (1928)
- Plastered in Paris (1928)
- Sailor's Luck (1933)
- Arizona to Broadway (1933)
- Swellhead (1935)
- Rip Roarin' Buckaroo (1936)
- Here Comes Trouble (1936)
- The Phantom of the Range (1936)
- 45 Fathers (1937)
- Battle of Broadway (1938)
- The Fighting 69th (1940)
- You're the One (1941)

== Bibliography ==
- Erens, Patricia. The Jew in American Cinema. Indiana University Press, 1984.
