= The Midnight Kiss =

1926 film

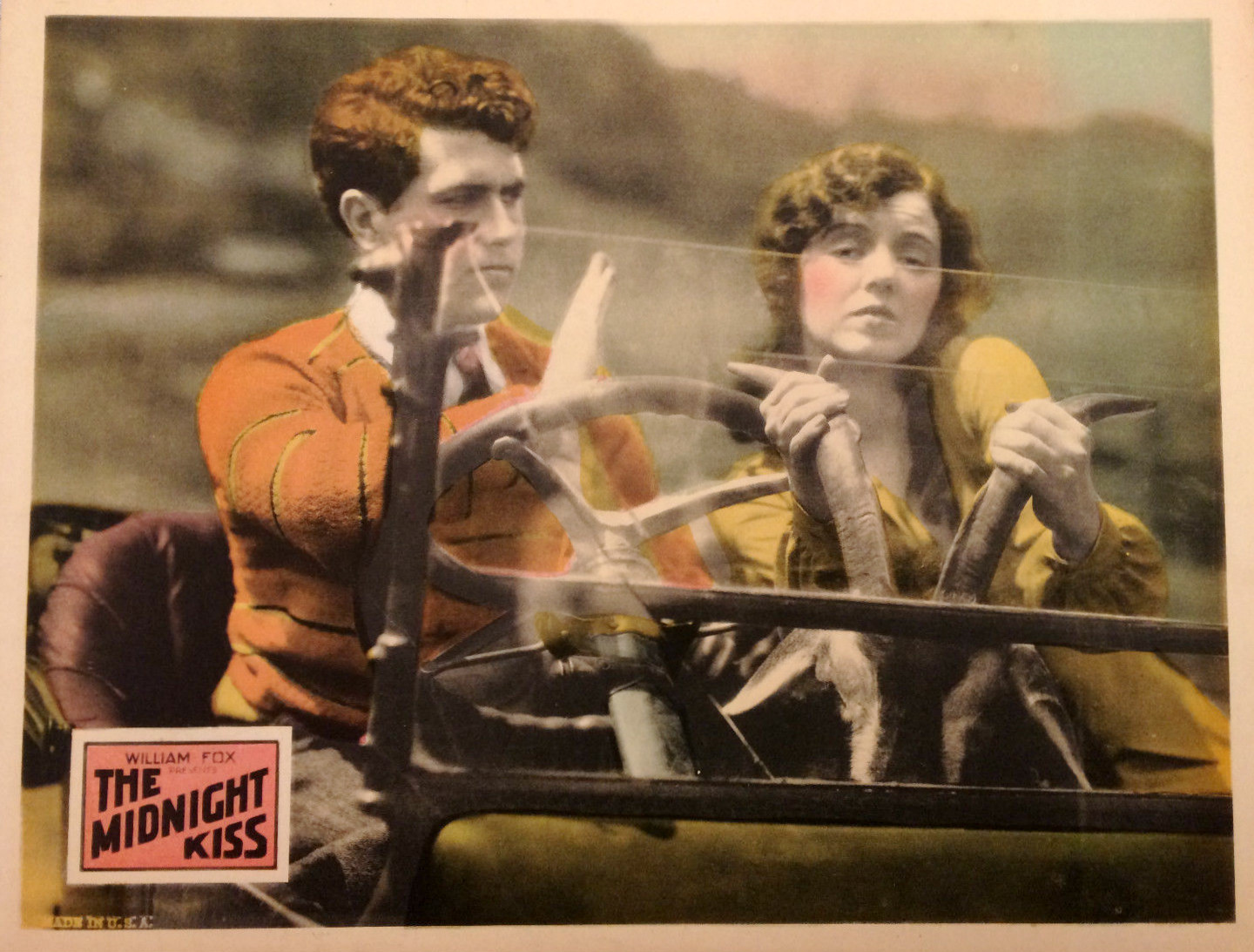
- Lobby card
- Directed by: Irving Cummings
- Written by: Alfred A. Cohn (scenario, adaptation)
- Based on: Pigs by Anne Morrison Chapin and Patterson McNutt
- Produced by: William Fox
- Starring: Janet Gaynor
- Cinematography: Abraham Fried
- Distributed by: Fox Film Corporation
- Release date: October 10, 1926
- Running time: 5 reels
- Country: United States
- Language: Silent (English intertitles)

The Midnight Kiss is a 1926 American silent comedy film directed by Irving Cummings and starring Janet Gaynor. It was produced and distributed by Fox Film Corporation. It is a lost film.

== Cast ==
- Richard Walling as Thomas H. Atkins Jr.
- Janet Gaynor as Mildred Hastings
- George Irving as Thomas H. Atkins Sr.
- Doris Lloyd as Ellen Atkins
- Tempe Pigott as Grandma
- Gladys McConnell as Lenore Hastings
- Herbert Prior as Smith Hastings
- Gene Cameron as Spencer Hastings
- Arthur Housman as Uncle Hector
- Bodil Rosing as Swedish maid
