= None but the Brave (1928 film) =

1928 film by Albert Ray

- Directed by: Albert Ray
- Written by: Dwight Cummins; Frances Agnew (scenario); Norman Z. McLeod (titles)
- Produced by: William Fox
- Starring: Charles Morton; Sally Phipps; J. Farrell MacDonald; Sharon Lynn; Tom Kennedy
- Cinematography: Edward T. Estabrook; Charles Van Enger
- Edited by: Alex Troffey
- Distributed by: Fox Film Corporation
- Release date: August 5, 1928
- Running time: 60 minutes
- Country: United States
- Languages: Silent film English intertitles

None but the Brave (1928) is an American silent film, released by Fox Film Corporation, directed by Albert Ray, and starring Charles Morton as Charles Stanton, Sally Phipps as Mary. The film also co-starred J. Farrell MacDonald, Sharon Lynn, and Tom Kennedy. One or two sequences were filmed in a two-strip Technicolor, made of black-and-white 35mm film dyed in colors. The film consists of six reels.

== Cast ==
- Charles Morton as Charles Stanton
- Sally Phipps as Mary
- Sharon Lynn as Paula
- J. Farrell MacDonald as John Craig
- Tom Kennedy as Noah
- Billy Butts as Freckles
- Alice Adair as Mary's Cook
- Tyler Brooke as Hotel Clerk

== See also ==
- List of early color feature films
