= The Last Ride (1931 film) =

1931 film

- Directed by: Duke Worne
- Written by: Arthur Hoerl
- Starring: Dorothy Revier; Virginia Brown Faire; Charles Morton
- Cinematography: M.A. Anderson
- Production company: Universal Pictures
- Distributed by: Universal Pictures
- Release date: December 28, 1931
- Running time: 64 minutes
- Country: United States
- Language: English

The Last Ride is a 1931 American crime film directed by Duke Worne and starring Dorothy Revier, Virginia Brown Faire and Charles Morton.

== Cast ==
- Dorothy Revier as Lita Alvaro
- Virginia Brown Faire as Doris White
- Charles Morton as Roy Smith
- Frank Mayo as Piccardi
- Tom Santschi as Big Boy
- Francis Ford as Brady
- Bobby Dunn as Dink

== Bibliography ==
- Alan G. Fetrow. Sound films, 1927-1939: a United States filmography. McFarland, 1992.
