= Condemned (1923 film) =

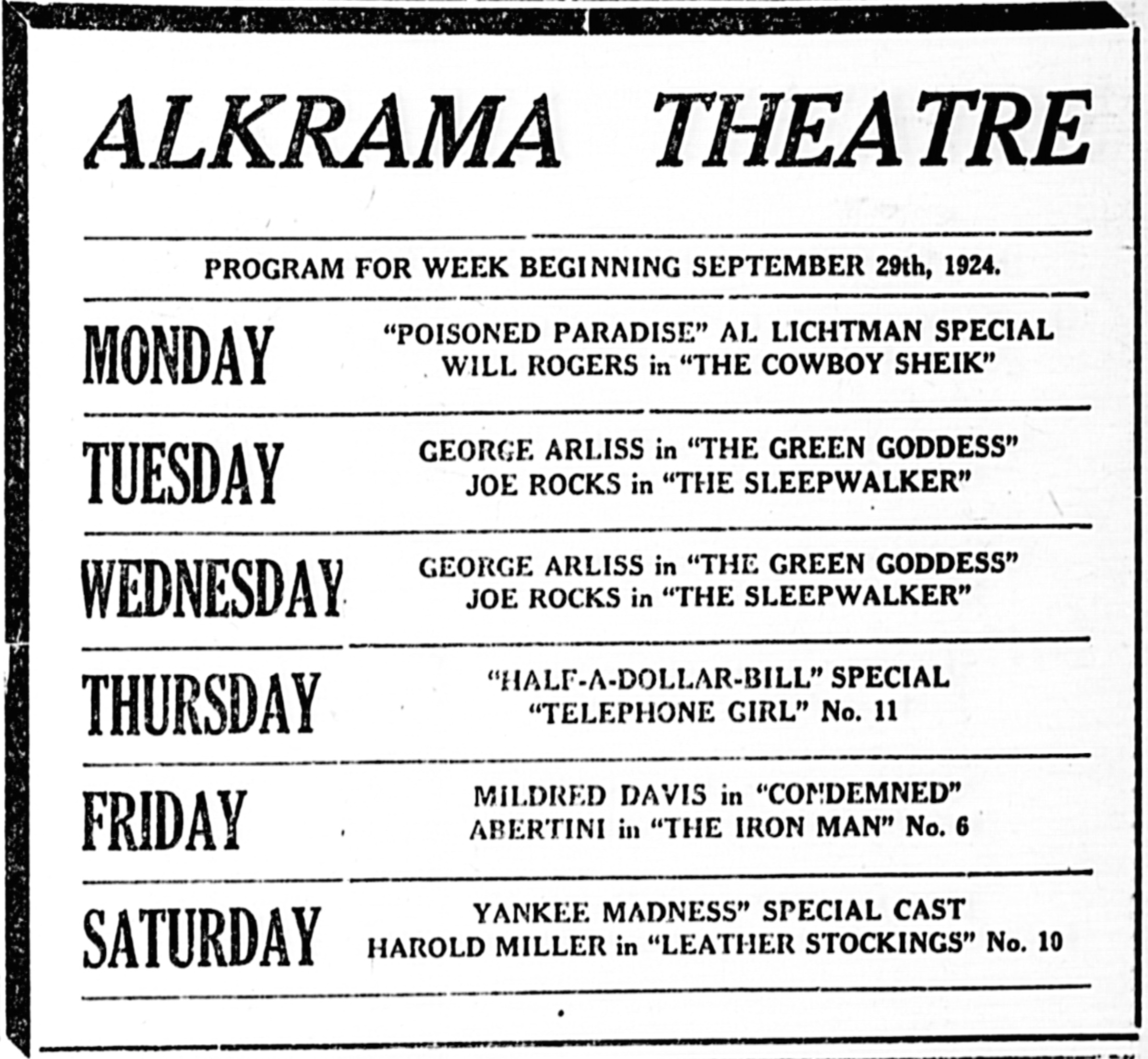
- Advertisement for several films, including one for the film Condemned on Friday.
- Directed by: Arthur Rosson
- Written by: Jules Furthman
- Produced by: Ben F. Wilson
- Starring: Mildred Davis; Carl Miller
- Production company: Ben Wilson Productions
- Distributed by: Grand Asher Distributing Corporation
- Release date: December 1923
- Running time: 60 minutes
- Country: United States
- Languages: Silent; English intertitles

Condemned is a 1923 silent comedy film directed by Arthur Rosson and starring Mildred Davis and Carl Miller. It was an independent production.

== Cast ==
- Mildred Davis as The Girl
- Carl Miller as The Man

== Bibliography ==
- Robert B. Connelly. The Silents: Silent Feature Films, 1910-36, Volume 40, Issue 2. December Press, 1998.
