= The City (1926 film) =

1926 film

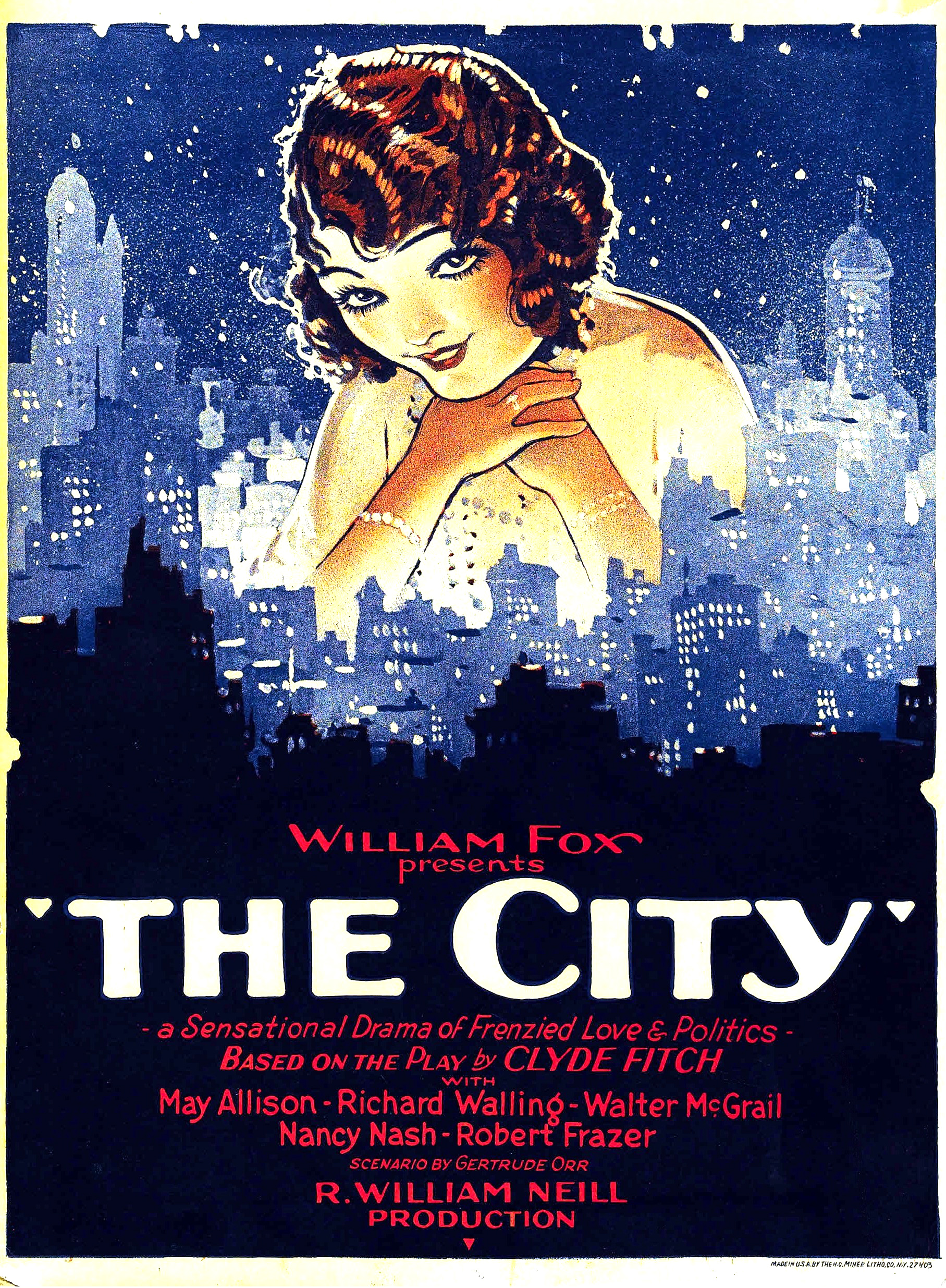
- Film poster
- Directed by: Roy William Neill
- Written by: Gertrude Orr (scenario / screenplay)
- Based on: The City by Clyde Fitch
- Produced by: William Fox
- Starring: May Allison; Robert Frazer; Walter McGrail; Nancy Nash
- Cinematography: James Diamond
- Distributed by: Fox Film Corporation
- Release date: November 14, 1926
- Running time: 60 minutes
- Country: United States
- Language: Silent (English intertitles)

The City is a 1926 American silent romantic drama film produced and released by the Fox Film Corporation. It was directed by Roy William Neill and is based on Clyde Fitch's 1909 Broadway play. A previous film on Fitch's play appeared in 1916. This version updated the story to contemporary 1926.

== Plot ==
After the death of George Rand Sr., the family breadwinner, a former criminal who has honestly rebuilt his life, his family members move to the city, where George Rand Junior soon finds himself running for mayor. The wife, on the other hand, neglects the family to pursue her social ambitions while young Cicely is tricked by Hannock, a drug addict who is responsible for the death of old Rand. Knowing the dead man's background, Hannock now blackmails George, his son, who eventually gives up his political ambitions and confronts the blackmailer. The latter ends up committing suicide and the family hurries to leave the city to return to the village.

== Cast ==
- May Allison as Elinor Voorhees
- Robert Frazer as George Rand Jr.
- George Irving as George Rand Sr.
- Lillian Elliott as Mrs. Elliott
- Walter McGrail as Jim Hannock
- Richard Walling as Chad Morris
- Nancy Nash as Cicely Rand
- Melbourne MacDowell as Vorhees
- Bodil Rosing as Sarah
- Fred Walton
- Scott Seaton (uncredited)

== Preservation ==
With no prints of The City located in any film archives, it is a lost film.

== See also ==
- 1937 Fox vault fire
