= New Year's Eve (1929 film) =

1929 film

- Directed by: Henry Lehrman
- Written by: Richard Connell(story:One Hundred Dollars); Dwight Cummins(scenario); William Kernell(intertitles)
- Produced by: William Fox
- Starring: Mary Astor; Charles Morton
- Cinematography: Conrad Wells
- Music by: Samuel L. Rothafel
- Distributed by: Fox Film Corporation
- Release date: February 24, 1929
- Running time: 70 minutes
- Country: United States
- Language: Sound (Synchronized) (English Intertitles)

New Year's Eve is a lost 1929 synchronized sound film drama produced and distributed by Fox Film Corporation and starring Mary Astor and Charles Morton. While the film has no audible dialog, it was released with a synchronized musical score with sound effects using the sound-on-film Movietone process. Veteran Henry Lehrman, who had worked with Mack Sennett and Charlie Chaplin, was the director. Samuel L. Rothafel wrote the music for film. As was the case for the majority of films during the early sound era, a silent version was prepared for theatres who had not yet converted to sound. Max Gold was an assistant director.

== Plot ==
Saddled with the care of a younger brother and unable to find work, Marjorie Ware puts aside her scruples and goes to see a gambler who has long cast a lustful eye on her. A pickpocket kills the gambler, and the police find Marjorie at the scene of the crime, charging her with the murder. The pickpocket later falls to his death, however, and evidence is uncovered that sets Mary free, cleared of all suspicion of guilt in the gambler's death. Mary is then reunited with Edward Warren, a man who once did her a great kindness.

== Cast ==
- Mary Astor – Marjorie Ware
- Charles Morton – Edward Warren
- Earle Fox – Barry Harmon
- Florence Lake – Pearl
- Arthur Stone – Steve
- Helen Ware – Landlady
- Freddie Burke Frederick – Little Brother
- Jane La Verne – Little Girl
- Sumner Getchell – Edward's friend
- Stuart Erwin – Landlady's son
- Virginia Vance – Little Girl's Mother

== See also ==
- List of early sound feature films (1926–1929)
