= Harry Sweet =

American actor

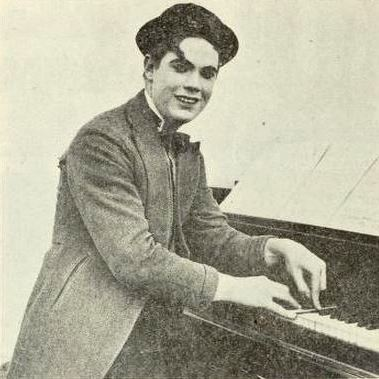
- Sweet in 1921
- Born: October 2, 1901; Colorado, US
- Died: June 18, 1933 (aged 31); Big Bear, California, US
- Years active: 1919–1933

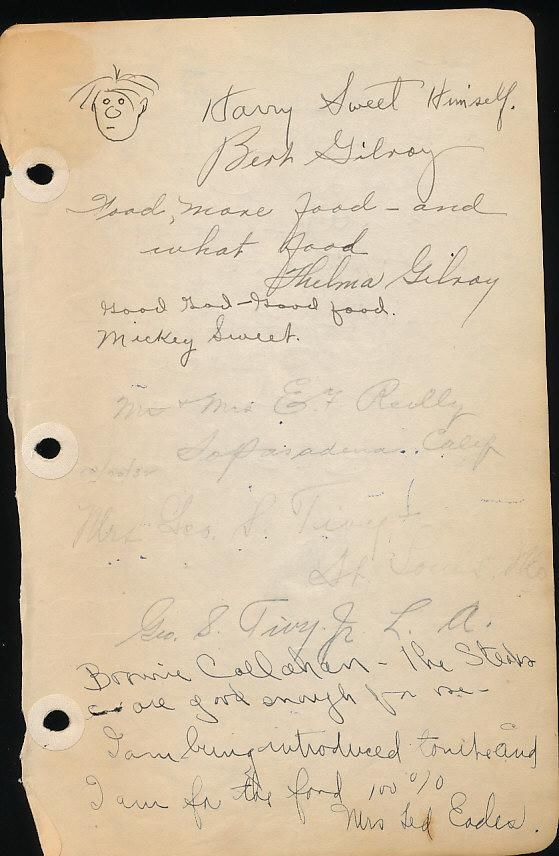
Mickey & Harry Sweet; Thelma & Bert Gilroy Inn registration book

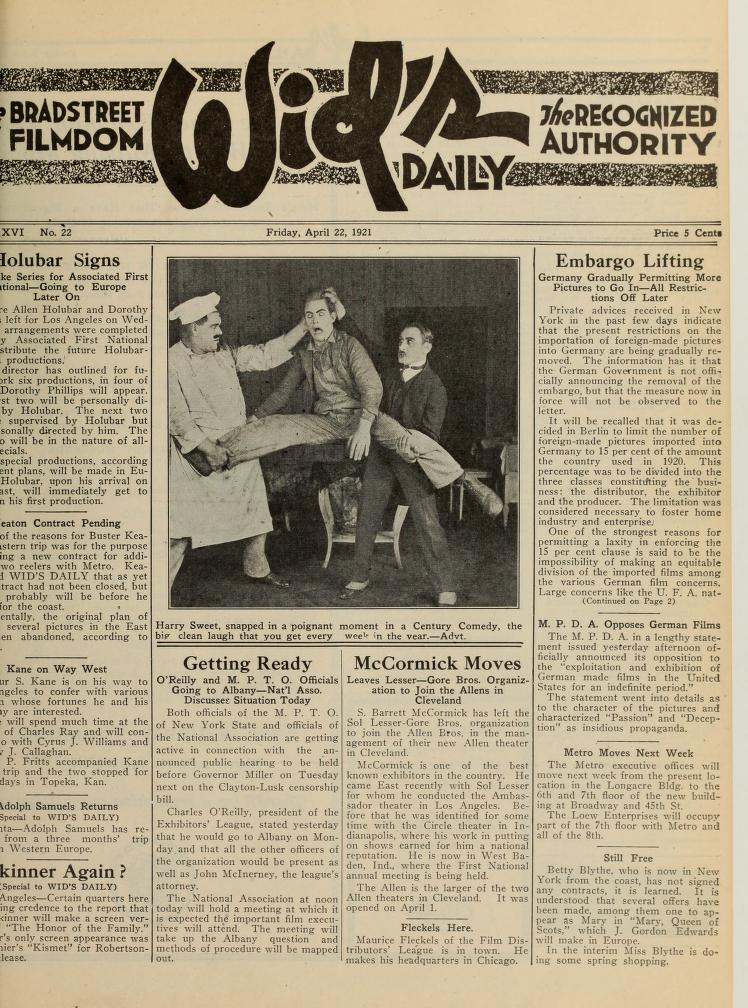
Chef Bud Jamison wishbones Harry Sweet in this Wid's Daily 1921 ad.

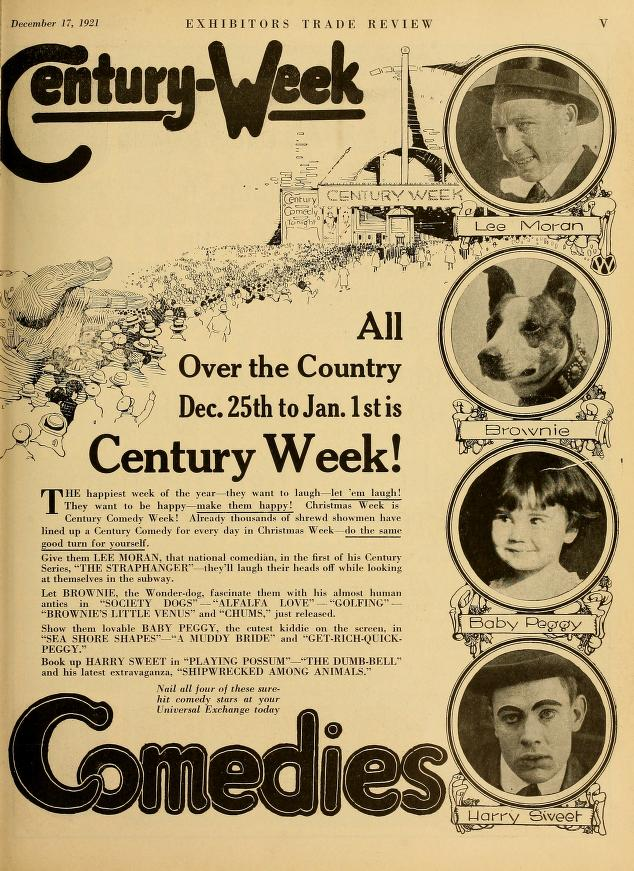
Harry Sweet Exhibitors Trade Review December 17, 1921

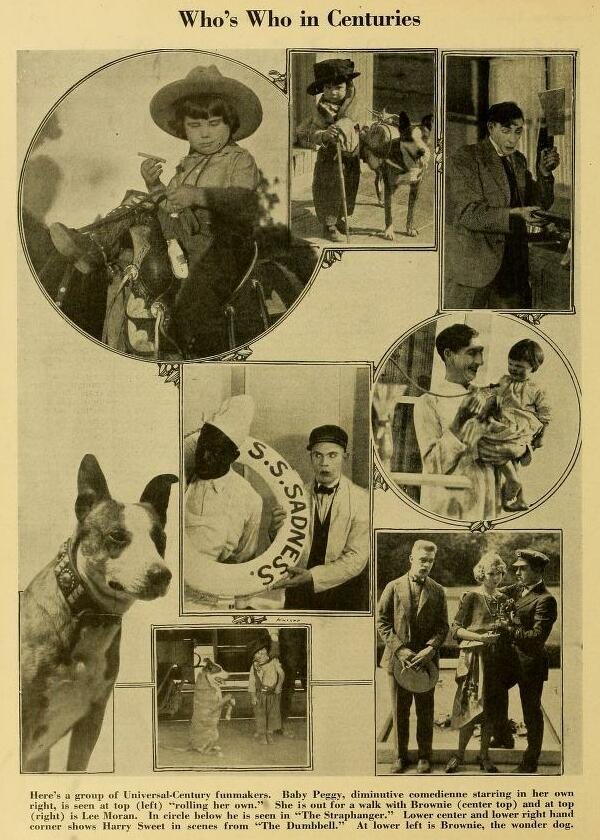
Harry Sweet Lee Moran Baby Peggy Exhibitors Trade Review 1922

Harry Sweet (October 2, 1901 – June 18, 1933) was an American actor, director and screenwriter. He appeared in 57 films between 1919 and 1932. He also directed 54 films between 1920 and 1933, including one Harry Langdon short, two of the Tay Garnett- penned comedies Stan Laurel made for Joe Rock, and fifteen of the earliest entries in the Edgar Kennedy "Average Man" series.

Sweet was an acrobat before he became an actor, which led to his doing his own stunts in films.

== Death ==
On June 18, 1933, Sweet was location scouting by private plane in the vicinity of Big Bear Valley. That night, at 7:15 pm, a plane crashed and sank to the bottom of Big Bear Lake, with the authorities initially uncertain as to the identity of the pilot as well as the number and identity of the plane's passengers; on June 19, Bert Gilroy, a film associate of Sweet's, left Los Angeles for Big Bear after efforts to contact the director in that city failed. Hours after the accident, when the plane was pulled from 28 feet of water, the bodies of Sweet, actress Claudette Ford, and scenario writer Howard (Hal) Davitt, were found in the cockpit; the coroner's investigation determined Sweet had drowned and that his companions had both died from fractured skulls suffered in the crash.

== Selected acting filmography ==
- Carnival Boat (1932)
- Her Man (1930)
- Hit the Deck (1930)
- Homesick (1928)
- Fascinating Youth (1926)
- Smart Alec (1921)

== Selected directing filmography ==
- She Outdone Him (1933) July 21, 1933 Script: Hugh Cummings, Harry Sweet
- Good Housewrecking (1933) June 16, 1933 Script: Harry Sweet
- A Merchant of Menace (1933) April 21, 1933 Script: Leslie Goodwins, Walter Weems
- Art in the Raw (1933) February 24, 1933 Script: Ben Holmes, Harry Sweet ...
- Fish Feathers (1932) December 16, 1932 Script: Hugh Cummings, Harry Sweet
- Sham Poo, the Magician (1932) November 25, 1932 Script: Hugh Cummings, Harry Sweet
- Parlor, Bedroom and Wrath (1932) October 14, 1932 Script: Hugh Cummings, Harry Sweet
- The Golf Chump (1932) August 5, 1932 Script: Hugh Cummings, Harry Sweet
- High Hats and Low Brows (1932) July 11, 1932 Script: Arthur 'Bugs' Baer, Ralph Ceder
- Giggle Water (1932) June 27, 1932 Script: Harry Sweet
- Stealin' Home (1932) May 9, 1932 Script: Arthur 'Bugs' Baer, Ralph Ceder
- Rule 'Em and Weep (1932) May 2, 1932 Script: Edward Earle, Walter Weems
- Mother-in-Law's Day (1932) April 25, 1932 Script: Harry Sweet
- Extra! Extra! (1932) April 4, 1932 Script: Ralph Ceder, Lex Neal
- Battle Royal (1932) February 29, 1932 Script: Arthur 'Bugs' Baer, Ralph Ceder
- Bon Voyage (1932) February 22, 1932 Script: Harry Sweet
- The Big Scoop (1931) November 16, 1931 Script: Everett Alton Brown, Hal Yates
- Slow Poison (1931) October 19, 1931 Script: Arthur 'Bugs' Baer, Ralph Ceder
- Thanks Again (1931) Script: Harry Sweet October 5, 1931
- Lemon Meringue (1931) August 3, 1931 Script: Harry Sweet
- All Gummed Up (1931) May 23, 1931 Script: Harry Sweet
- Not So Loud (1931) May 3, 1931 Script: Harry Sweet
- Rough House Rhythm (1931) April 5, 1931 Script: Harry Sweet
- Hot Wires (1931) February 22, 1931 Script: Chuck Callahan, Harry L. Fraser
- Next Door Neighbors (1931) January 28, 1931 Script: George Green, Harry Sweet
- Waltzing Around (1929) May 13, 1929 Script: Paul Gerard Smith
- Music Fiends (1929) April 3, 1929 Script: Clark & McCullough
- Beneath the Law (1929) March 7, 1929 Script: Clark & McCullough ...
- Half a Man (1925) Script: Tay Garnett
- The Sleuth (1925) Script: Tay Garnett
