= An Old Sweetheart of Mine =

1923 film directed by Harry Garson

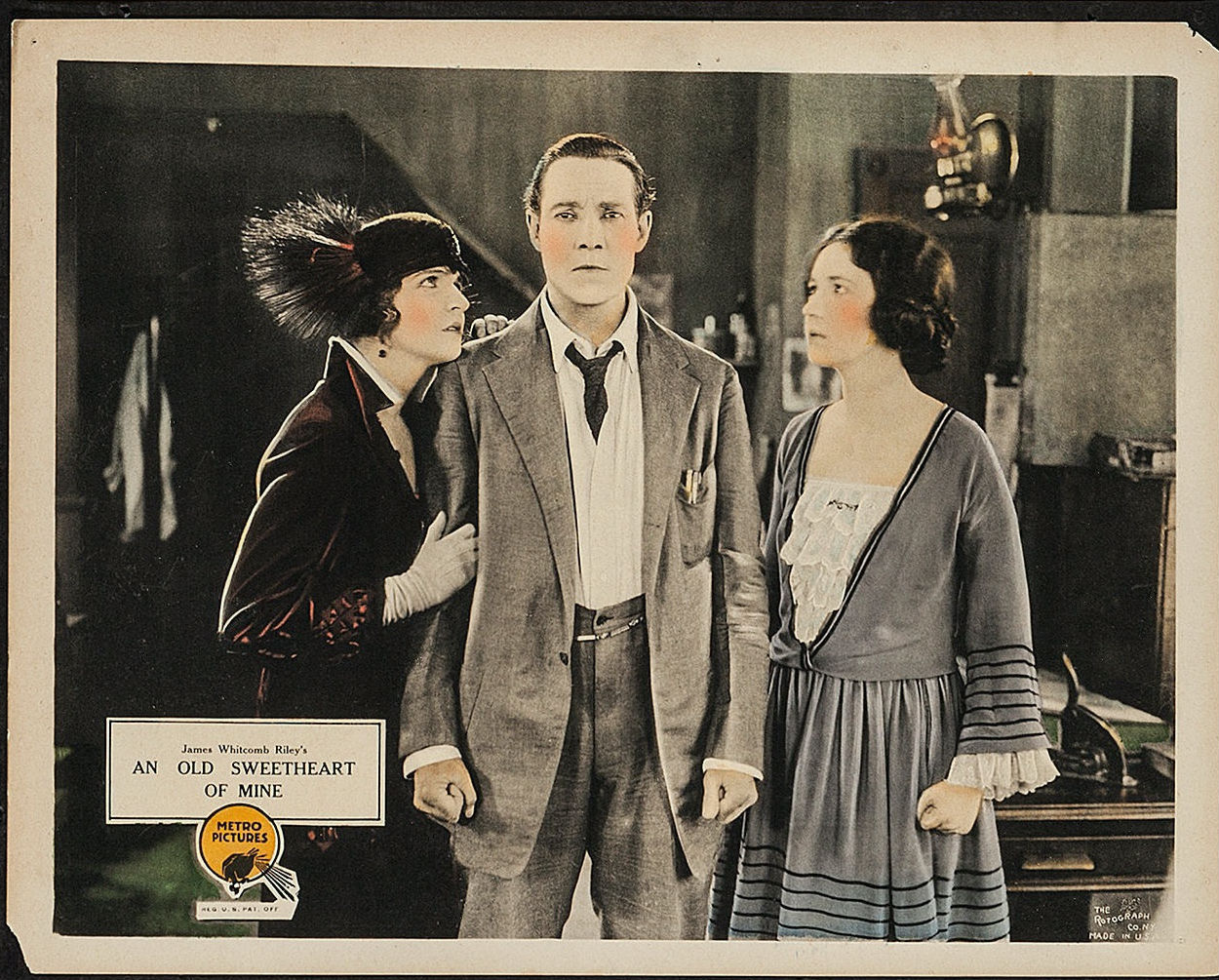
- Directed by: Harry Garson
- Written by: Louis D. Lighton
- Based on: "An Old Sweetheart of Mine" by James Whitcomb Riley
- Starring: Elliott Dexter; Helen Jerome Eddy; Lloyd Whitlock
- Cinematography: L. William O'Connell
- Edited by: Violet Blair
- Production company: Harry Garson Productions
- Distributed by: Metro Pictures
- Release date: April 16, 1923
- Running time: 60 minutes
- Country: United States
- Language: Silent (English intertitles)

An Old Sweetheart of Mine is a 1923 American silent drama film directed by Harry Garson and starring Elliott Dexter, Helen Jerome Eddy, and Lloyd Whitlock.

== Cast ==
- Elliott Dexter as John Craig
- Helen Jerome Eddy as Mary Ellen Anderson
- Lloyd Whitlock as Stuffy Shade
- Hazel Keener (credited as Barbara Worth) as Irene Ryan
- Arthur Hoyt as Frederick McCann
- Gene Cameron as William Norton
- Pat Moore as John Craig, as a boy
- Mary Jane Irving as Mary Ellen Anderson, as a girl
- Turner Savage as Stuffy Shade, as a boy

== Preservation ==
With no prints of An Old Sweetheart of Mine located in any film archives, it is considered a lost film.

== Bibliography ==
- Goble, Alan. The Complete Index to Literary Sources in Film. Walter de Gruyter, 1999.
