= Renegades of the West =

1932 film

- Directed by: Casey Robinson
- Screenplay by: Albert S. Le Vino
- Story by: Frank Richardson Pierce
- Produced by: B.F. Zeidman
- Starring: Tom Keene; Roscoe Ates; Betty Furness; James Mason; Carl Miller
- Cinematography: Allen G. Siegler
- Edited by: Holbrook N. Todd
- Music by: Max Steiner
- Production company: RKO Pictures
- Distributed by: RKO Pictures
- Release date: November 25, 1932
- Running time: 55 minutes
- Country: United States
- Language: English

Renegades of the West is a 1932 American Western film directed by Casey Robinson and written by Albert S. Le Vino. The film stars Tom Keene, Roscoe Ates, Betty Furness, James Mason and Carl Miller. The film was released on November 25, 1932, by RKO Pictures.

== Plot ==
After learning of his father's killer in prison, Tom Bagby goes undercover to prove Curly Bogard, whom he believes did it, is guilty. Tom gets a job on Curly's ranch and tries to get evidence against him, but his plans are foiled when the plot twists and his cellmate comes and exposes his identity.

== Cast ==
- Tom Keene as Tom Bagby
- Roscoe Ates as Dr. Henry Fawcett
- Betty Furness as Mary Fawcett
- James Mason as Blackie
- Carl Miller as Banker Rankin
- Max Wagner as Bob
- Rockliffe Fellowes as Curly Bogard
- Roland Southern as Abandoned Baby
- Jules Cowles as Marshal
- Joseph W. Girard as James Dowling (as Joe Girard)
- Jack Pennick as Dave
