= Gene Cameron =

American actor (1901–1927)

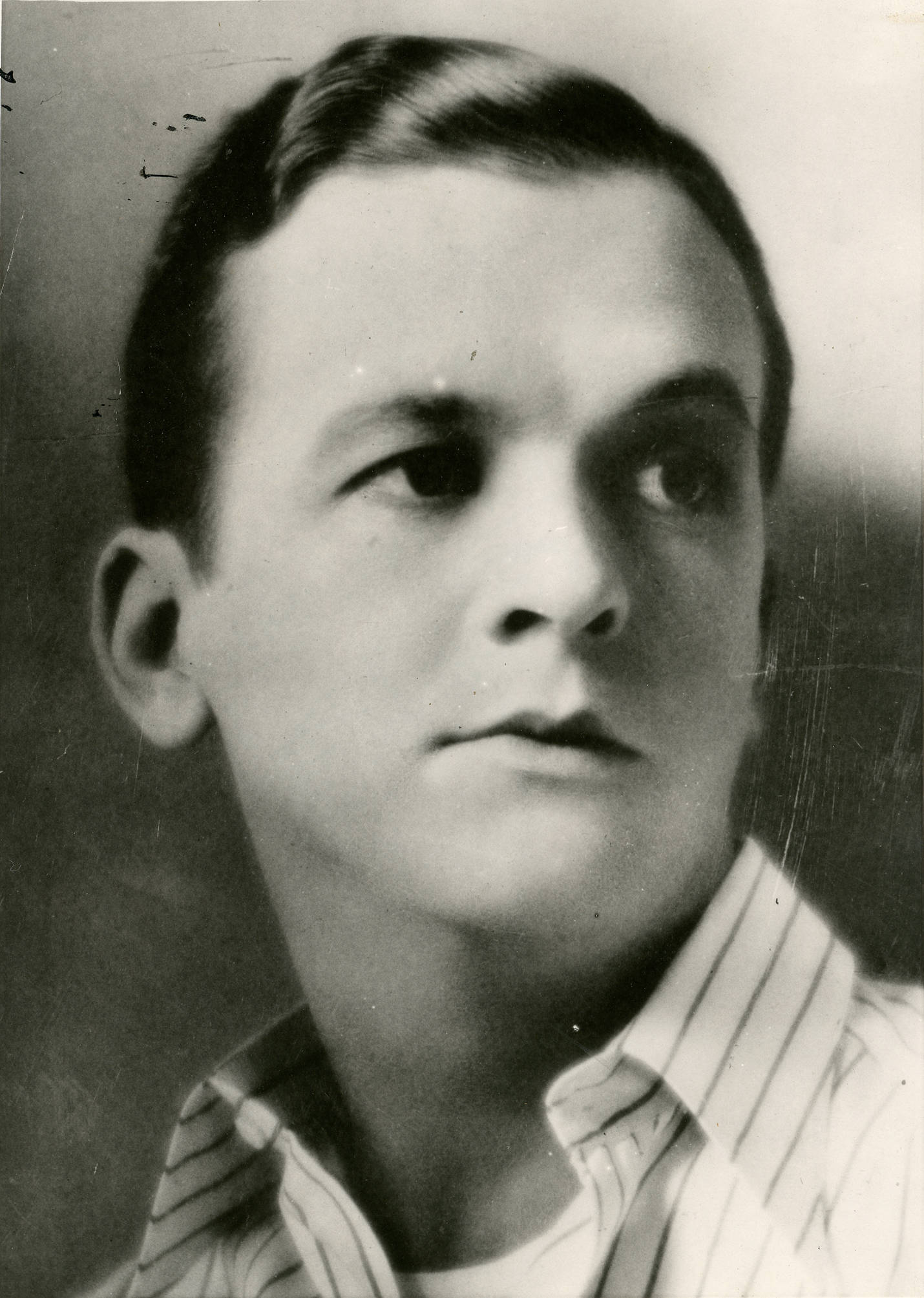

Gene Cameron (1901 – November 16, 1927) was an actor who appeared on stage and in films. He performed in minstrel shows including in drag. Cameron appeared in feature films and comedy shorts. He had a starring role in the 1927 film The Gay Retreat.

Cameron was born in Denton, Texas and raised in Dallas. He was killed in a car accident in Arizona and two girls that were in the car were injured.

== Filmography ==
- The Sign of the Rose (1922) as Philip Griswold
- An Old Sweetheart of Mine (1923) as William Norton
- Circe, the Enchantress (1924)
- Excuse Me (1925) as Lt. Hudson
- The Midnight Kiss (1926) as Spencer Hastings
- Light Wines and Bearded Ladies (1926)
- Chain Lightning (1927) as Binghamwell Stokes
- The Gay Retreat (1927) as Richard Wright, a starring role. The film was later remade as Great Guns.
