= Nancy Nash (actress) =

American actress (1897–?)

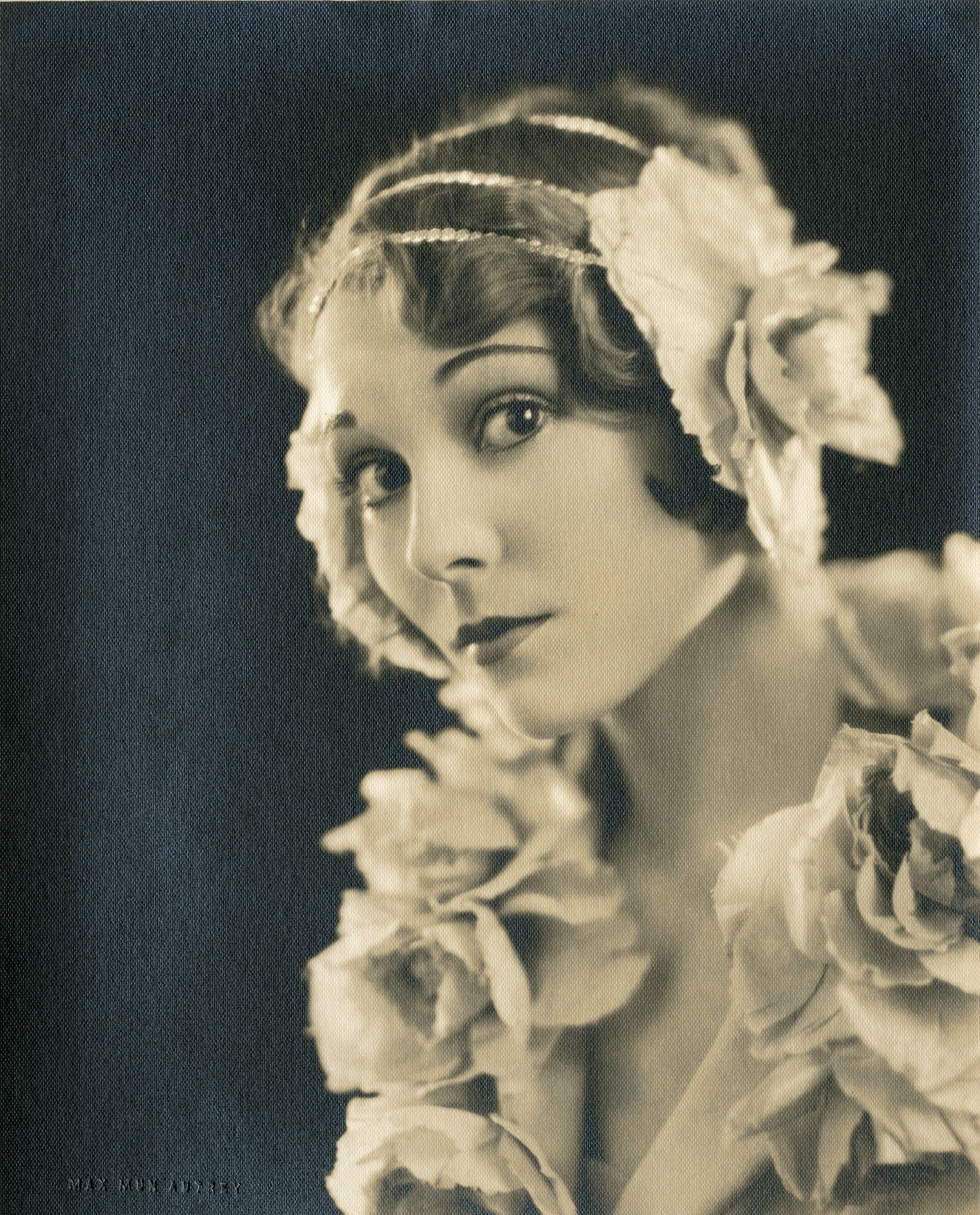
- Nash in 1926
- Born: Maude Miller; 1897; Mercedes, Texas, U.S.
- Occupation: Actress
- Years active: 1926–1941

Nancy Nash (born Maude Miller; 1897–?) was an American actress. She appeared in films from the 1920s into the early 1940s. She had several leading roles including in Upstream and Rich But Honest. She was promoted as one of the "Youth in Fox Pictures" during her early career.

== Career ==
Born to a family of ranchers near Mercedes, Texas, Nash was interested in recreating high fashion shown in films and often took notes on the outfits actresses wore in order to copy them. In 1926, on a visit to Hollywood, she decided to audition for an acting role in The City alongside 60 other applicants, and won the part. This conflicted with her plans to attend the University of Texas the following week, and she had to convince her parents that pursuing a film career was more important.

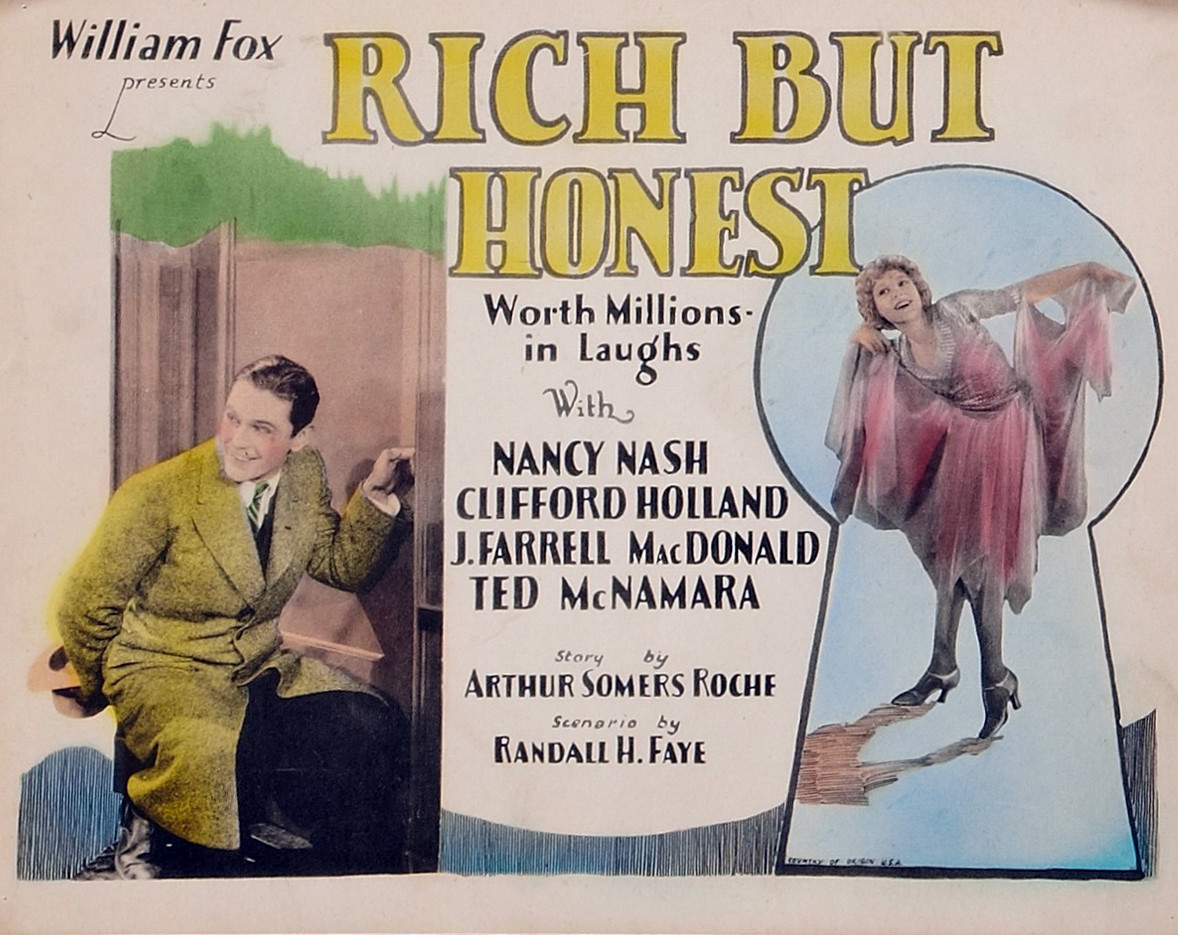
Lobby card for Rich But Honest

She was announced as an actress by Winfield Sheehan, vice president of Fox Film, in September 1926 before confirming her first role in The City in October of that year. She next had the lead role with Earle Foxe in the 1927 comedy feature Upstream, which was considered a lost film until the discovery of a copy in the New Zealand Film Archive in 2009. The Times said that Nash's and Raymond Hitchcock's work gave the film "pathos and humor, thrills and suspense and characterization that is poignantly human".

Nash then starred in the 1927 Vitaphone film Rich But Honest alongside Clifford Holland, based on a short story by Arthur Somers Roche, in which Nash's character rode in a Willys-Knight sedan to represent her newfound wealth. Nash left her acting career for several years when she married a newspaper reporter, but returned to film in 1931, when she joined the Goldwyn Girls team led by Samuel Goldwyn and starred alongside 75 other women in the 1932 film The Kid from Spain. In 1933, she signed a new contract with Jack L. Warner as a chorus girl for Warner Brothers films, first starring in Footlight Parade.

== Filmography ==
- The City (1926) as Cicely Rand
- Upstream (1927) as Gertie Ryan
- Rich But Honest (1927) as Florine Candless
- The Loves of Carmen (1927) as Michaela
- The Ballyhoo Buster (1928) as Dorothy
- Palmy Days (1931) as Goldwyn Girl (uncredited)
- The Kid from Spain (1932) as Goldwyn Girl (uncredited)
- 42nd Street (1933) as Chorus Girl (uncredited)
- Footlight Parade (1933) as Chorus Girl (uncredited)
- Dames (1934) as Chorus Girl (uncredited)
- Sis Hopkins (1941) as Chorus Girl (uncredited)

== Personal life ==
Originally married to Los Angeles Examiner reporter Otto Winkler, they divorced in the early 1930s. Nash then married her second husband, attorney Jay Chotiner in 1933. She was later married to film producer Ben Hershfield, a former husband of actress Rita La Roy.
