= Rich But Honest =

1927 film directed by Albert Ray

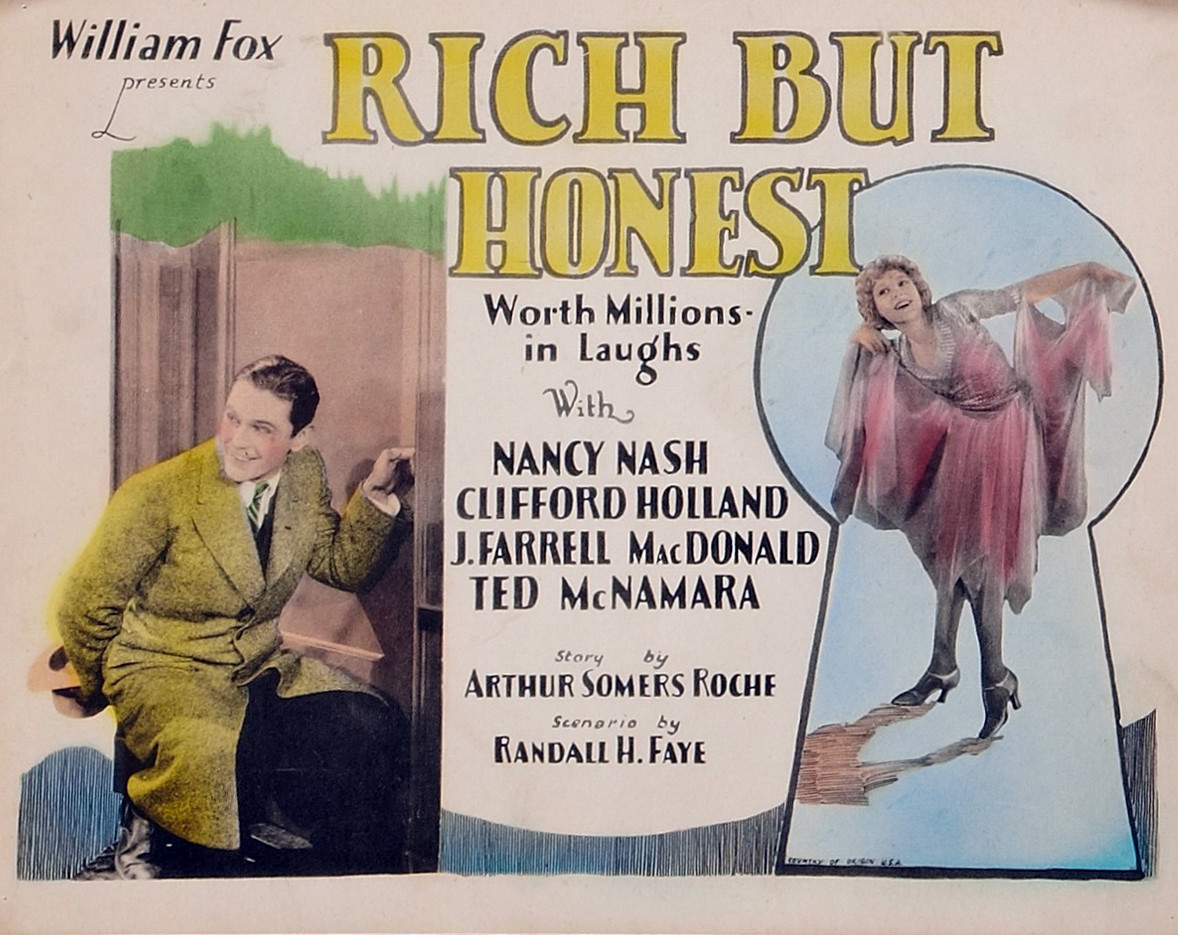
- Lobby card
- Directed by: Albert Ray; Horace Hough
- Written by: Randall H. Faye
- Produced by: William Fox
- Starring: Nancy Nash; John Holland; Charles Morton; J. Farrell MacDonald
- Cinematography: Sidney Wagner
- Production company: Fox Film Corporation
- Distributed by: Fox Film Corporation
- Release date: May 22, 1927
- Running time: 60 minutes
- Country: United States
- Language: Silent (English intertitles)

Rich But Honest is a lost 1927 American silent comedy-drama film, written by Randall H. Faye and directed by Albert Ray and Horace Hough. The film was released on May 22, 1927 by Fox Film Corporation, starring Nancy Nash, John Holland, Charles Morton, and J. Farrell MacDonald.

== Cast ==
- Nancy Nash as Florine Candless
- John Holland as Bob Hendricks
- Charles Morton as Dick Carter
- J. Farrell MacDonald as Diamond Jim O'Grady
- Tyler Brooke as Barney Zoom
- Ted McNamara as Heinie
- Marjorie Beebe as Maybelle
- Ernest Shields as Archie
- Doris Lloyd as Mrs. O'Grady
- Coy Watson Jr. as Jimmie (uncredited)

== Preservation ==
The film is now considered lost.

== See also ==
- List of lost films
- 1937 Fox vault fire
