= The Gay Retreat =

1927 silent comedy film

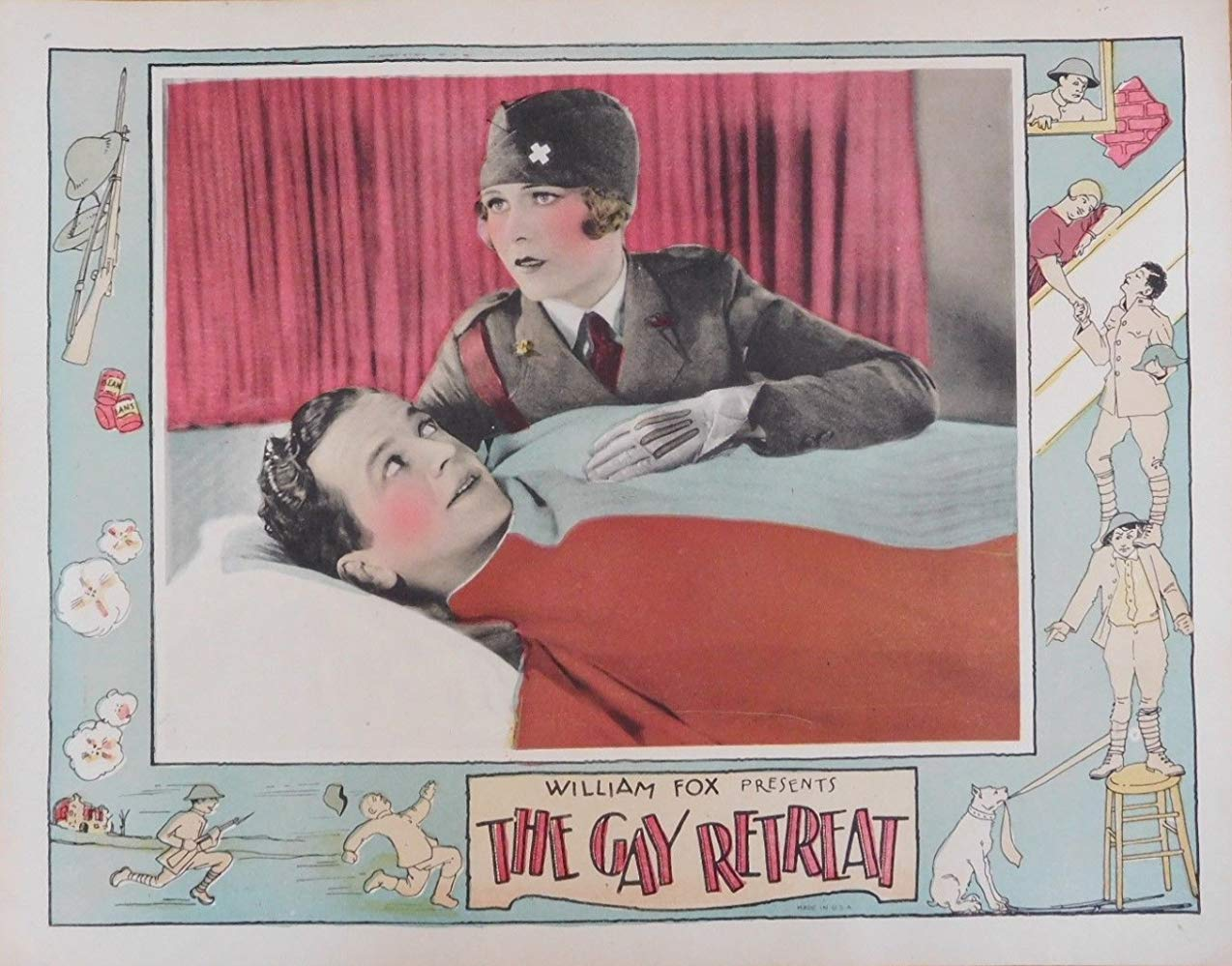
- Directed by: Benjamin Stoloff
- Written by: Eddie Moran (adaptation) (as Edward Moran); Murray Roth (adaptation); J. Walter Ruben
- Story by: William M. Conselman; Edward Marshall
- Starring: Gene Cameron; Betty Francisco; Judy King; Sammy Cohen; Jerry Madden; Holmes Herbert
- Cinematography: Sidney Wagner
- Production company: Fox Film Corporation
- Distributed by: Fox Film Corporation
- Release date: September 25, 1927
- Running time: 60 minutes
- Country: United States
- Language: Silent (English intertitles)

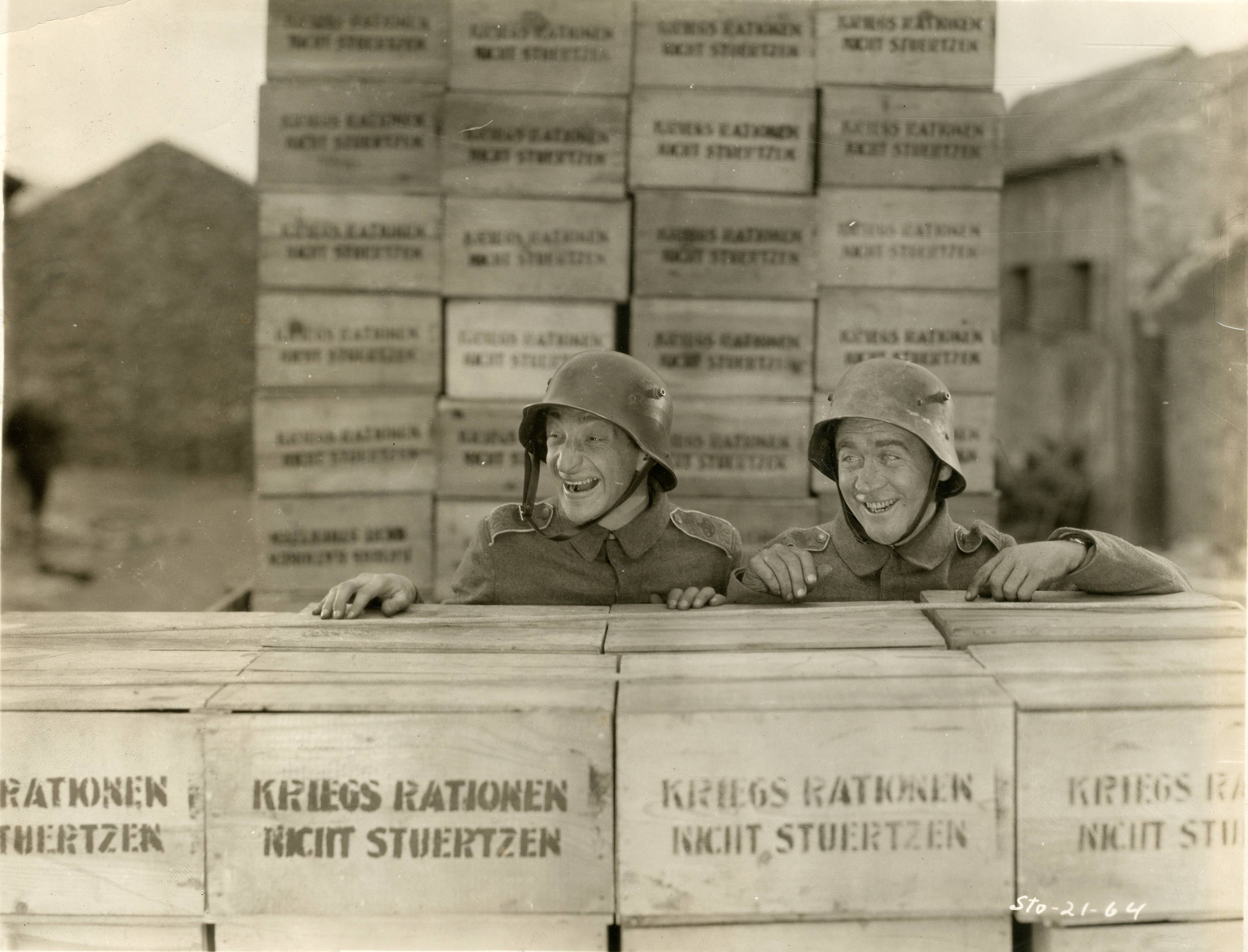
1927 film still

The Gay Retreat is a 1927 American silent comedy film directed by Benjamin Stoloff and starring Gene Cameron, Betty Francisco, Judy King, Sammy Cohen, Jerry Madden, and Holmes Herbert. The film was released by Fox Film Corporation on September 25, 1927.

It was originally to be titled A.W.O.L.

== Cast ==
- Gene Cameron as Richard Wright
- Betty Francisco as Betty Burnett
- Judy King as Joan Moret
- Sammy Cohen as Sam Nosenbloom
- Jerry Madden as Jerry (as Jerry the Giant)
- Holmes Herbert as Charles Wright
- Ted McNamara as Ted McHiggins
- Charles Gorman as Edward Fulton
- Pal the Dog as Pal

== Preservation ==
A print of the film survives at the EYE Film Institute Netherlands.
