= Colleen (1927 film) =

1927 film

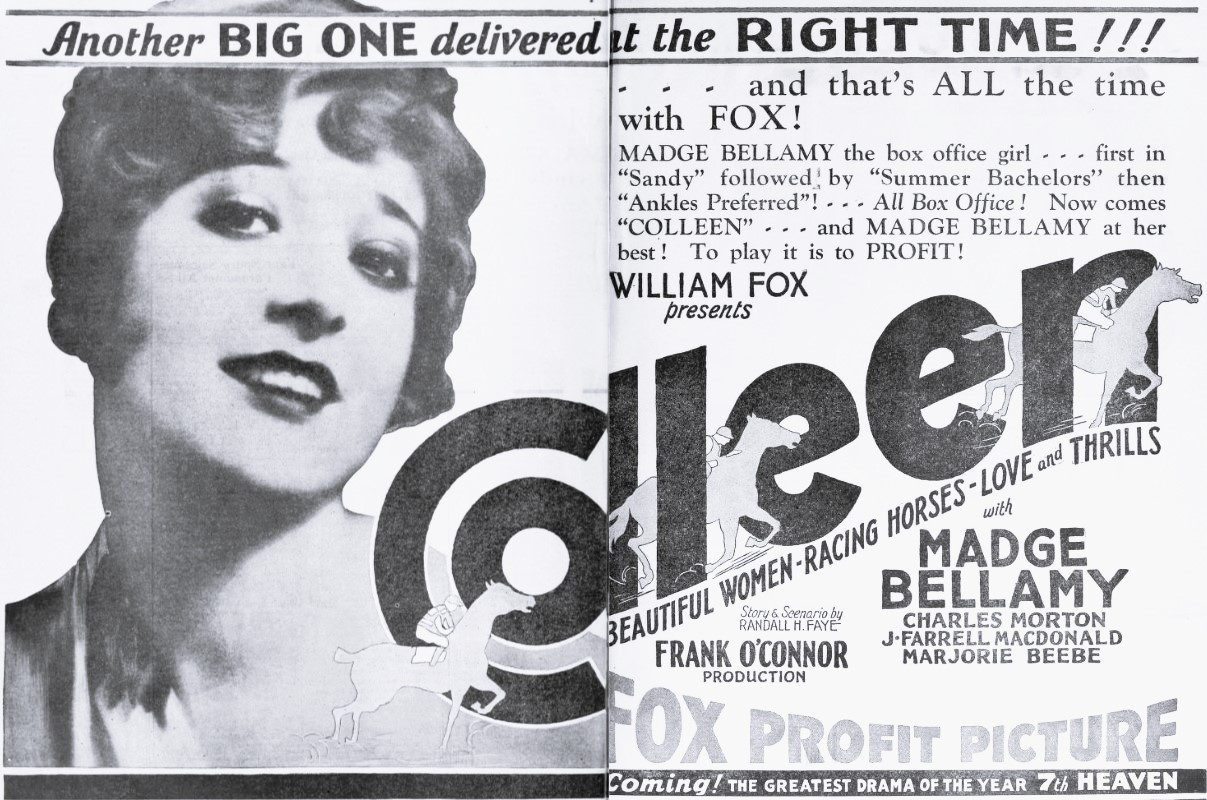
- Advertisement
- Directed by: Frank O'Connor
- Screenplay by: Randall Faye
- Produced by: William Fox
- Starring: Madge Bellamy; Charles Morton; J. Farrell MacDonald; Tom Maguire; Sammy Cohen; Marjorie Beebe
- Cinematography: George Schneiderman
- Production company: Fox Film Corporation
- Distributed by: Fox Film Corporation
- Release date: July 3, 1927
- Running time: 60 minutes
- Country: United States
- Language: Silent (English intertitles)

Colleen is a 1927 American silent comedy film directed by Frank O'Connor and written by Randall Faye. The film stars Madge Bellamy, Charles Morton, J. Farrell MacDonald, Tom Maguire, Sammy Cohen, and Marjorie Beebe. The film was released on July 3, 1927, by Fox Film Corporation.

== Plot ==
Shiela Kelly, an Irish-American debutante, falls in with love Terry O'Flynn, an impoverished aristocrat.

== Cast ==
- Madge Bellamy as Sheila Kelly
- Charles Morton as Terry O'Flynn
- J. Farrell MacDonald as Mr. O'Flynn
- Tom Maguire as Sheridan McShane Kelly
- Sammy Cohen as Pawnbroker's Son
- Marjorie Beebe as Kitty
- Ted McNamara as O'Flynn's Groom
- Tom McGuire as Police Lieutenant
- Sarah Padden as Police Lieutenant's Wife
- Sidney Franklin as Pawnbroker
- Carl Stockdale as Bailiff

== Preservation ==
An incomplete print of Colleen is in the Czech Film Archive.
