= Battle of Broadway =

1938 film by George Marshall

- Film poster
- Directed by: George Marshall
- Screenplay by: Lou Breslow; John Patrick
- Story by: Norman Houston
- Produced by: Sol M. Wurtzel
- Starring: Victor McLaglen; Brian Donlevy; Gypsy Rose Lee; Raymond Walburn; Lynn Bari; Jane Darwell
- Cinematography: Barney McGill
- Edited by: Jack Murray
- Production company: 20th Century Fox
- Distributed by: 20th Century Fox
- Release date: April 22, 1938
- Running time: 84 minutes
- Country: United States
- Language: English

Battle of Broadway is a 1938 American comedy film directed by George Marshall and written by Lou Breslow and John Patrick. The film stars Victor McLaglen, Brian Donlevy, Gypsy Rose Lee, Raymond Walburn, Lynn Bari and Jane Darwell. The film was released on April 22, 1938, by 20th Century Fox.

== Plot ==
Homer C. Bundy (Raymond Walburn), the president of the Bundy Steel Company of Bundy, Pennsylvania, sends troublesome employees "Big" Ben Wheeler (Victor McLaglen) and "Chesty" Webb (Brian Donlevy) to New York City to break up Bundy's son Jack's (Robert Kellard) engagement to suspected gold digger Marjorie Clark (Lynn Bari). Jack discovers his father's plot, and turns the tables on the brawling steelworkers: he asks gorgeous Linda Lee (Gypsy Rose Lee)--the object of the competitive Big Ben's and Chesty's amorous pursuits—to pretend she's his fiancé, to put the boys off the trail. Trouble ensues when Homer arrives in NYC...and falls for Linda.

== Cast ==
- Victor McLaglen as Big Ben Wheeler
- Brian Donlevy as Chesty Webb
- Gypsy Rose Lee as Linda Lee
- Raymond Walburn as Homer C. Bundy
- Lynn Bari as Marjorie Clark
- Jane Darwell as Mrs. Rogers
- Robert Kellard as Jack Bundy
- Sammy Cohen as Turkey
- Esther Muir as Opal Updyke
- Eddie Holden as Svenson
- Hattie McDaniel as Agatha
- Paul Irving as Professor Halligan
- Frank Moran as Pinky McCann
- Andrew Tombes as Judge Hutchins

== Reception ==
Critical reception for Battle of Broadway upon its initial release was largely positive. In a 1938 review for the film The New York Times stated "Though it will not be hailed as one of the year's finer historical films and might even be said, despite the riot scenes, to suffer from a ind of timid civilian understatement, the extent of which can only be measured by those who have lived through "the terror" – as we of the Times Square area tend to think of it – "Battle of Broadway" seems to provoke enough of those tolerant, unanalytical audience guffaws to justify its modestly budgeted existence."

DVD Talk gave a favorable review for Battle of Broadway, writing that it was a "Knockabout farce, energetically handled" and that "By the time the movie wraps up with its third or fourth unapologetic big brawl, Battle of Broadway's hard-won rough-and-tumble pose becomes positively endearing."
