= Rita Reif =

American columnist and author (1929–2023)

Rita Anne Reif (née Murphy; June 12, 1929 – June 16, 2023) was an American newspaper columnist and author. She wrote the Antiques column for The New York Times from 1972 to 1997.

== Books ==
- Home, it takes more than money (Quadrangle/New York Times Book Co, 1975)
- Rita Reif's The New York Times World Guide to Antiques Shopping
- Treasure Rooms of America's Mansions Manors and Houses
