= Four Sons =

1928 film directed by John Ford

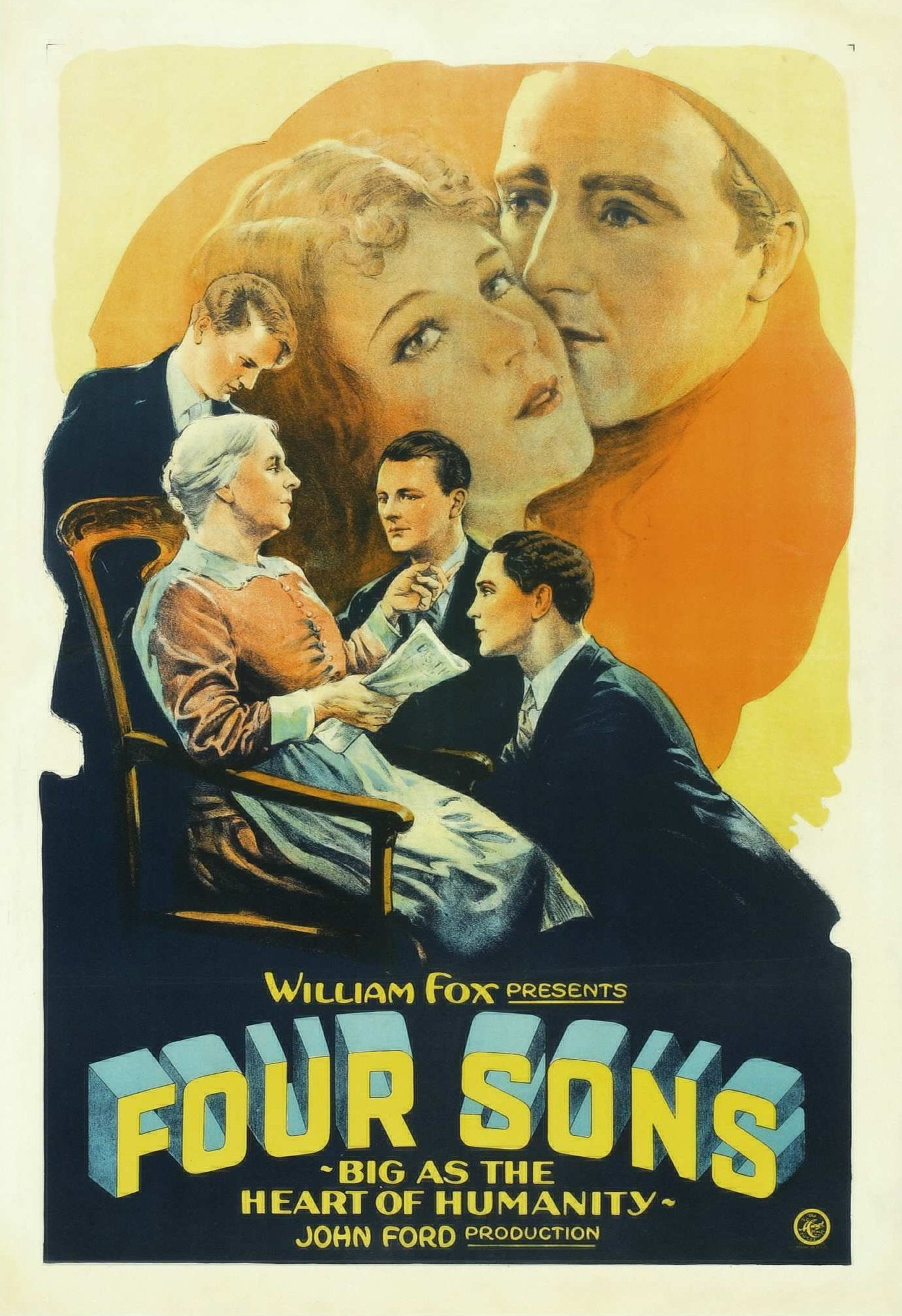
- Theatrical release poster
- Directed by: John Ford
- Written by: Philip Klein
- Based on: "Grandmother Bernle Learns Her Letters" by I. A. R. Wylie
- Produced by: John Ford; William Fox
- Starring: Margaret Mann; June Collyer; Charles Morton; Francis X. Bushman Jr.
- Cinematography: Charles G. Clarke; George Schneiderman
- Edited by: Margaret Clancey
- Production company: Fox Film Corporation
- Distributed by: Fox Film Corporation
- Release date: February 13, 1928 (United States)
- Running time: 100 minutes
- Country: United States
- Languages: Sound (Synchronized) (English intertitles)
- Box office: $1.5 million

Four Sons is a 1928 American synchronized sound drama film directed and produced by John Ford and written for the screen by Philip Klein from a story by I. A. R. Wylie first published in the Saturday Evening Post as "Grandmother Bernle Learns Her Letters" (1926). While the film has no audible dialog, it was released with a synchronized musical score with sound effects using the sound-on-film movietone process.

It is one of only a handful of survivors out of the more than 50 films Ford directed between 1917 and 1928. It starred Margaret Mann, James Hall, and Charles Morton. The film is also notable for the presence of the young John Wayne in an uncredited role as an officer. The film's soundtrack was recorded using the Movietone sound-on-film system but was also released in the sound-on-disc format.

A family is torn apart by the advent of World War I. It was remade in 1940 with the same title, starring Don Ameche and Eugenie Leontovich, and directed by Archie Mayo, although the war was updated to World War II.

== Plot ==
Four Sons (1928)

In a quiet Bavarian village before the Great War, Mother Bernle, a widow, tends a home and devotes herself to her four sons. The eldest, Joseph “Dutch” Bernle, dreams of opportunity abroad and departs for America, where he marries Annabelle and opens a small delicatessen in New York City. The remaining three—Franz, Johann, and youngest son Andreas—remain in Bavaria under their mother’s care.

Life in the village is filled with simple routines, enlivened by the visits of the pompous yet kindly postman, gossip at the inn run by the innkeeper, and pronouncements from the Bürgermeister. But the peaceful rhythms are overshadowed by the presence of the arrogant Prussian officer Major von Stomm, whose militaristic posturing foreshadows the coming storm.

When war breaks out, Bavaria is swept into the conflict. Joseph, now an American citizen, enlists with the American Expeditionary Forces, while his three brothers are conscripted into the German army. One by one, Franz, Johann, and Andreas march away through the mist-shrouded countryside, their departures marked by the tolling church bells. Mother Bernle endures the separations with quiet courage, even as the military machine strips away her comforts and the officers treat the villagers with cold disdain.

The war’s cruelty reaches its height when Joseph, serving in France, comes upon a battlefield where his brother lies dying. In the fog, the wounded man calls weakly for “Mütterchen” (“Little Mother”). Soon after, news arrives from the postman—three times over—that Franz, Johann, and Andreas have been killed in action. The grief is overwhelming, yet Mother Bernle sits steadfastly at her supper table, the same place where her boys once gathered, refusing to let despair consume her.

With the Armistice, Joseph returns to America to find his delicatessen thriving, now the heart of a small chain of stores. Longing to care for his mother, he writes for her to join him. To qualify for immigration, the illiterate woman attends school under the guidance of the kindly schoolmaster, struggling to learn her letters among children.

At Ellis Island, however, the pressure of the examination proves too much; she forgets her lessons and is detained. That night, in a moment of innocent confusion, she wanders out of the detention area into the streets of New York. Lost in the rain, she faces the crush of the subway and the chaos of traffic until a patrolman takes her in hand. Eventually she is brought to Joseph’s modern apartment, where he returns from a frantic search to find her by the fire, cradling his young son in her arms.

== Cast ==
- Margaret Mann as Mother Bernle
- James Hall as Joseph "Dutch" Bernle
- Charles Morton as Johann Bernle
- Ralph Bushman as Franz Bernle
- George Meeker as Andreas Bernle
- June Collyer as Annabelle
- Earle Foxe as Maj. von Stomm
- Albert Gran as The postman
- Frank Reicher as The schoolmaster
- Archduke Leopold of Austria as a captain
- Hughie Mack as The Innkeeper (uncredited)
- August Tollaire as The Bürgermeister (uncredited)
- Robert Parrish as Joseph's son (uncredited)
- John Wayne as Officer (uncredited)

== Music ==
The film featured a theme song entitled "Little Mother" which was composed by Ernö Rapée and Lew Pollack.

== Reception ==
Time magazine called the movie "nicely cast," though also "the latest candified cinemotherlove":

Four Sons parades the emotions of Bavarian Mother Bernle who sees three sons goose step to war and death. The fourth and youngest had sailed before the War to the U. S., but he too eventually holds a bayonet. Evil appears in the person of a Prussian, monocled and stooped, mannered and sneering. But Director John Ford sees to it that the boy is safely returned to New York and mother.

== Preservation ==
The Academy Film Archive preserved Four Sons in 1999.

== See also ==
- List of early sound feature films (1926–1929)
