= Strong Boy =

1929 film directed by John Ford

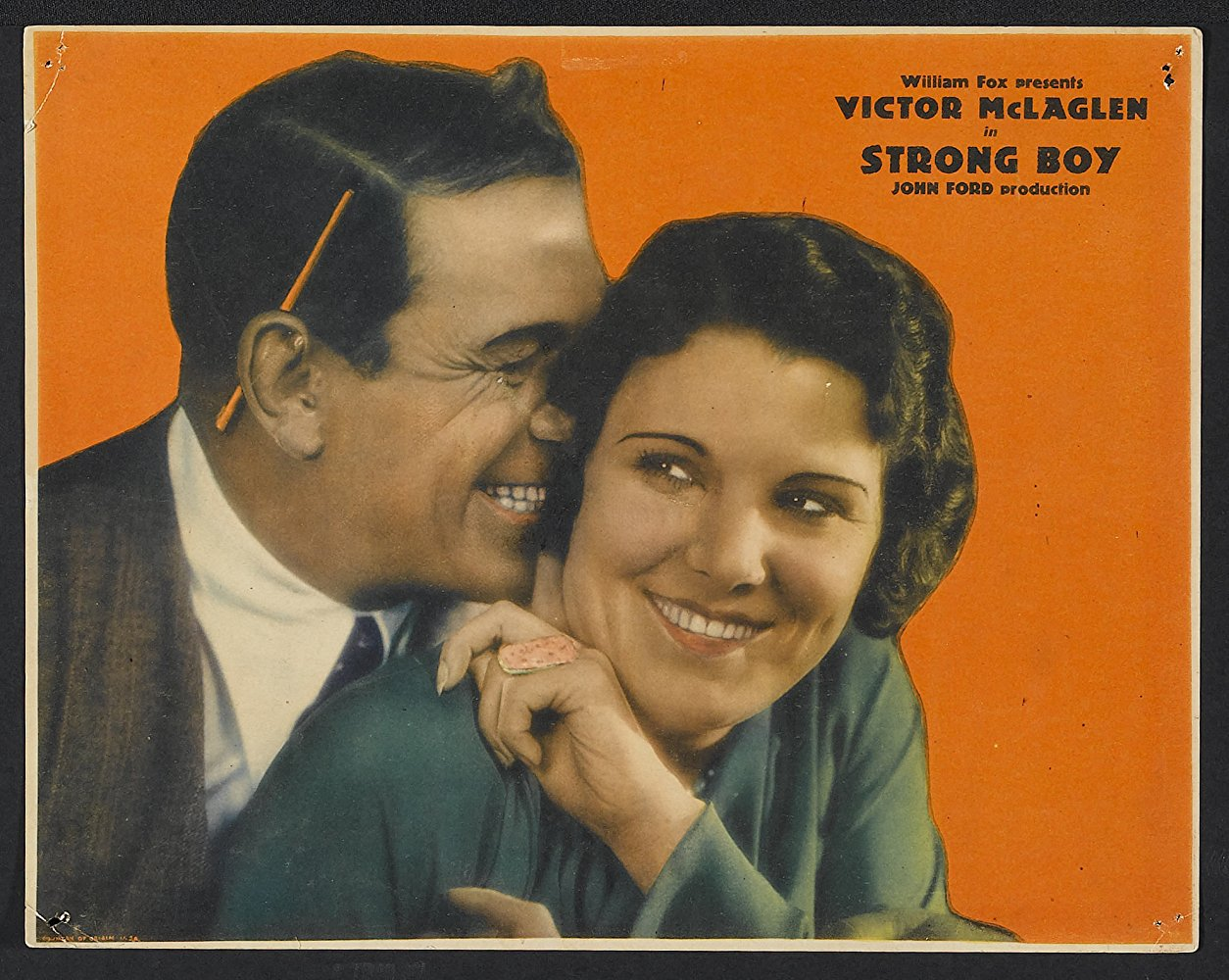
- Film poster
- Directed by: John Ford
- Written by: Andrew Bennison; James Kevin McGuinness; John McLain; Malcolm Stuart Boylan (titles)
- Story by: Frederick Hazlitt Brennan
- Starring: Victor McLaglen; Leatrice Joy
- Cinematography: Joseph H. August
- Distributed by: Fox Film Corporation
- Release date: March 3, 1929
- Running time: 62 minutes
- Country: United States
- Language: Sound (Synchronized) (English Intertitles)

Strong Boy is a 1929 American Synchronized sound comedy film directed by John Ford. While the film has no audible dialog, it was released with a synchronized musical score with sound effects using the sound-on-film Movietone process. The film, which was Ford's last silent film, is now considered to be lost. A trailer for the film was discovered in the New Zealand Film Archive in 2010 and subsequently preserved by the Academy Film Archive the same year.

== Cast ==
- Victor McLaglen as Strong Boy
- Leatrice Joy as Mary McGregor
- J. Farrell MacDonald as Angus McGregor
- Clyde Cook as Pete
- Buddy Roosevelt as Wilbur Watkins (credited as Kent Sanderson)
- Douglas Scott as Wobby
- Slim Summerville as Slim
- Tom Wilson as Baggage master
- Eulalie Jensen as Queen of Lisonia
- David Torrence as Railroad president
- Dolores Johnson as Prima donna
- Robert Ryan as Baggage man
- Jack Pennick as Baggage man

== See also ==
- List of lost films
- List of early sound feature films (1926–1929)
