= Gerould =

Gerould is a surname. Notable people with the surname include:

- Bobby Gerould, American sports announcer
- Daniel C. Gerould (1928–2012), American playwright
- Gary Gerould, American sports announcer
- Gordon Hall Gerould (1877–1953), American philologist and folklorist
- Katharine Elizabeth Fullerton Gerould (1879–1944), American writer

== See also ==
- Gerould Wilhelm (born 1948), American botanist and lichenologist
