= Tennessee's Partner (short story) =

- Short story by Bret Harte
- Country: United States

Publication
- Published in: Overland Monthly
- Publication type: Periodical
- Media type: Print
- Publication date: 1869

Tennessee's Partner is a short story by Bret Harte, first published in the Overland Monthly in 1869, which has been described as "one of the earliest 'buddy' stories in American fiction." It was later loosely adapted into four films.

== Background ==
The characters are reportedly based on the lives of Jason P. Chamberlain and James A. Chaffee, two inseparable friends, who settled in the California gold rush town Second Garrotte in 1852, and built a house, later referred to as Bret Harte's Cabin.

== Homosexual context ==
Logan Scherer, writing about late-nineteenth-century literature in the Oxford American, notes that "Novels and stories about men exploring intimacy with each other abounded: [such as] Bret Harte’s 'Tennessee’s Partner' (1869)." Scherer adds:

It is not until later, after Tennessee’s partner buries the body of his hanged friend, that we see the heart-stopping love he had for his mate: “[F]rom that day his rude health and great strength seemed visibly to decline; and when the rainy season fairly set in, and the tiny grass-blades were beginning to peep from the rocky mound above Tennessee’s grave, he took to his bed.” Tennessee’s partner finally surrenders himself in the midst of a terrible storm: in death they reunite. Harte tells the story of surly frontier besties in the hushed language of inarticulate but star-crossed lovers. Romantic friendship can be exultant or quiet. It can also be tragic.

== Plot ==
An audiobook version of Tennessee’s Partner read by Nick Number.

The story is set in Sandy Bar, an Old West town, and focuses on two men, nicknamed "Tennessee" and "Tennessee's Partner." While Tennessee is a reckless gambler, his partner is humorless and practical. Despite their disparate personalities, they share a strong friendship that did not fail even when Tennessee was responsible for his partner's bride estranging him.

When Tennessee blatantly tries to steal from a stranger, he is arrested and put on trial. Tennessee's Partner tries to stick up for his friend, saying that he might not agree with everything Tennessee does, but he still supports him. Tennessee's Partner then tries to bribe the judge, so as to pay for his partner's crime, but the judge refuses. Tennessee shakes hands with his partner, telling him, "Euchred, old man!" Tennessee's Partner claims that he was just passing through and decided to check up on Tennessee. Neither speak to each other again and Tennessee is hanged.

Tennessee's Partner asks for the body of his friend and as he takes the donkey-cart away, other people follow out of curiosity or jest. Once Tennessee's Partner reaches his cabin, he makes a grave for his dead partner and declares that he carried Tennessee home, just as he'd done while his friend was alive. Weeks later, after declining in health, Tennessee's Partner lies in his death bed on a stormy night and thinks that he needs to go get Tennessee. After an attempt to rise, he is stopped by his attendant, but believes himself to be braving the storm, looking for Tennessee on the trail. In his final moment, Tennessee's Partner imagines himself finding Tennessee, and the story ends with "And so they met".

== Publication history ==
First printed in California in the Overland Monthly for October 1869, "Tennessee's Partner" was reprinted the following month in Baltimore, in the New Eclectic Magazine. In 1870 the story was published in a collected volume of Harte's short stories, printed in Boston, The Luck of Roaring Camp and Other Sketches. Reviews of the volume appeared in the Lakeside Monthly, the Atlantic Monthly and in Blackwood's Edinburgh Magazine, all giving particular mention to "Tennessee's Partner". In the same year the story was anthologized in London in George Augustus Sala's A 3rd Supply of Yankee Drolleries: The Most Recent Works of the Best American Humourists. Thereafter it continued to appear in magazines, such as Boston's weekly Every Saturday of Jan. 14, 1871, as well as in other anthologies and in collections of Bret Harte's work.

== Literary criticism ==
- Tara Penry, "'Tennessee's Partner' as Sentimental Western Metanarrative", American Literary Realism, Vol. 36, No. 2 (Winter, 2004), pp. 148–165.

== Films ==
The short story has been filmed as Tennessee's Pardner (1916), The Flaming Forties (1924), The Golden Princess (1925), and Tennessee's Partner (1955).
