= Men Call It Love =

1931 film

- Directed by: Edgar Selwyn
- Screenplay by: Doris Anderson
- Based on: Among the Married by Vincent Lawrence
- Starring: Adolphe Menjou; Leila Hyams; Norman Foster; Mary Duncan; Hedda Hopper
- Cinematography: Harold Rosson
- Edited by: Frank Sullivan
- Production company: Metro-Goldwyn-Mayer
- Distributed by: Metro-Goldwyn-Mayer
- Release date: March 14, 1931
- Running time: 72 minutes
- Country: United States
- Language: English

Men Call It Love is a 1931 American pre-Code romantic melodrama film directed by Edgar Selwyn and written by Doris Anderson. The film stars Adolphe Menjou, Leila Hyams, Norman Foster, Mary Duncan and Hedda Hopper. It was released on March 14, 1931 by Metro-Goldwyn-Mayer.

== Cast ==
- Adolphe Menjou as Tony
- Leila Hyams as Connie
- Norman Foster as Jack
- Mary Duncan as Helen
- Hedda Hopper as Callie
- Robert Emmett Keane as Joe
- Harry Northrup as Brandt
