= Northwest Trail =

1945 film by Derwin Abrahams

- Original film poster
- Directed by: Derwin Abrahams
- Written by: William Beaudine (adaptation); Harvey Gates (screenplay); L. J. Swabacher
- Based on: story by James Oliver Curwood
- Produced by: William B. David; Max King presented by Robert L. Lippert
- Starring: Bob Steele
- Cinematography: Marcel Le Picard
- Edited by: Thomas Neff
- Music by: Frank Sanucci
- Production company: Action Pictures
- Distributed by: Screen Guild Productions (US); Exclusive (UK)
- Release date: November 30, 1945 (United States)
- Running time: 66 minutes 61 minutes (American DVD)
- Country: United States
- Language: English

Northwest Trail is a 1945 American contemporary Western film directed by Derwin Abrahams shot in Cinecolor at Lake Hemet, California. It stars Bob Steele, Joan Woodbury, and Madge Bellamy making a comeback appearance in her final film.

== Plot ==
Royal Canadian Mounted Police (RCMP) Trooper O'Brien assists Kate Owens when her car breaks down. Upon arrival at headquarters, his Inspector-in-charge assigns him to escort Kate to visit her Uncle in Morgan's Post located in the backwoods. As there are no roads to the area the two must travel by horse. O'Brien has two other tasks when he arrives; to discover why RCMP Sergeant Means has not filed a report in months and to investigate the complaint of Poodles Hanneford who alleges that the river going through his property has been blocked off and he has been fired upon when investigating.

What begins as a screwball comedy film between the witty Kate and strait-laced Mountie takes many unexpected turns when a rider steals Kate's suitcase that contains $20,000 but the rider is found shot to death with the money missing. Upon arrival in Morgan's Post Sgt Means chastises O'Brien for his incompetence and orders him back to headquarters.

== Cast ==
- Bob Steele as RCMP Matt O'Brien
- Joan Woodbury as Kate Owens
- John Litel as Sergeant Means
- Raymond Hatton as Morgan
- Madge Bellamy as Mrs. Yeager
- Ian Keith as Inspector McGrath
- George Meeker as Whitey Yeager
- Charles B. Middleton as Pierre
- John Hamilton as John Owens
- Poodles Hanneford as Poodles Hanneford
- Gracie Hanneford as Jill Hanneford
