= Silk Legs =

1927 film

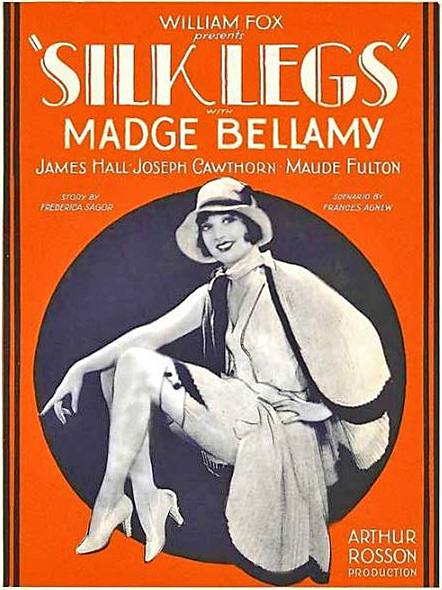
- Directed by: Arthur Rosson
- Screenplay by: Frances Agnew; Delos Sutherland
- Story by: Frederica Sagor Maas
- Starring: Madge Bellamy; James Hall; Joseph Cawthorn; Maude Fulton; Margaret Seddon
- Cinematography: Rudolph J. Bergquist
- Production company: Fox Film Corporation
- Distributed by: Fox Film Corporation
- Release date: December 18, 1927
- Running time: 60 minutes
- Country: United States
- Language: English

Silk Legs is a 1927 American comedy film directed by Arthur Rosson and written by Frances Agnew and Delos Sutherland. The film stars Madge Bellamy, James Hall, Joseph Cawthorn, Maude Fulton and Margaret Seddon. The film was released on December 18, 1927, by Fox Film Corporation.

== Cast ==
- Madge Bellamy as Ruth Stevens
- James Hall as Phil Barker
- Joseph Cawthorn as Ezra Fulton
- Maude Fulton as Mary McGuire
- Margaret Seddon as Mrs. Fulton

== Preservation ==
With no holdings located in archives, Silk Legs is considered a lost film.
