= Sandy (1926 film) =

1926 film directed by Harry Beaumont

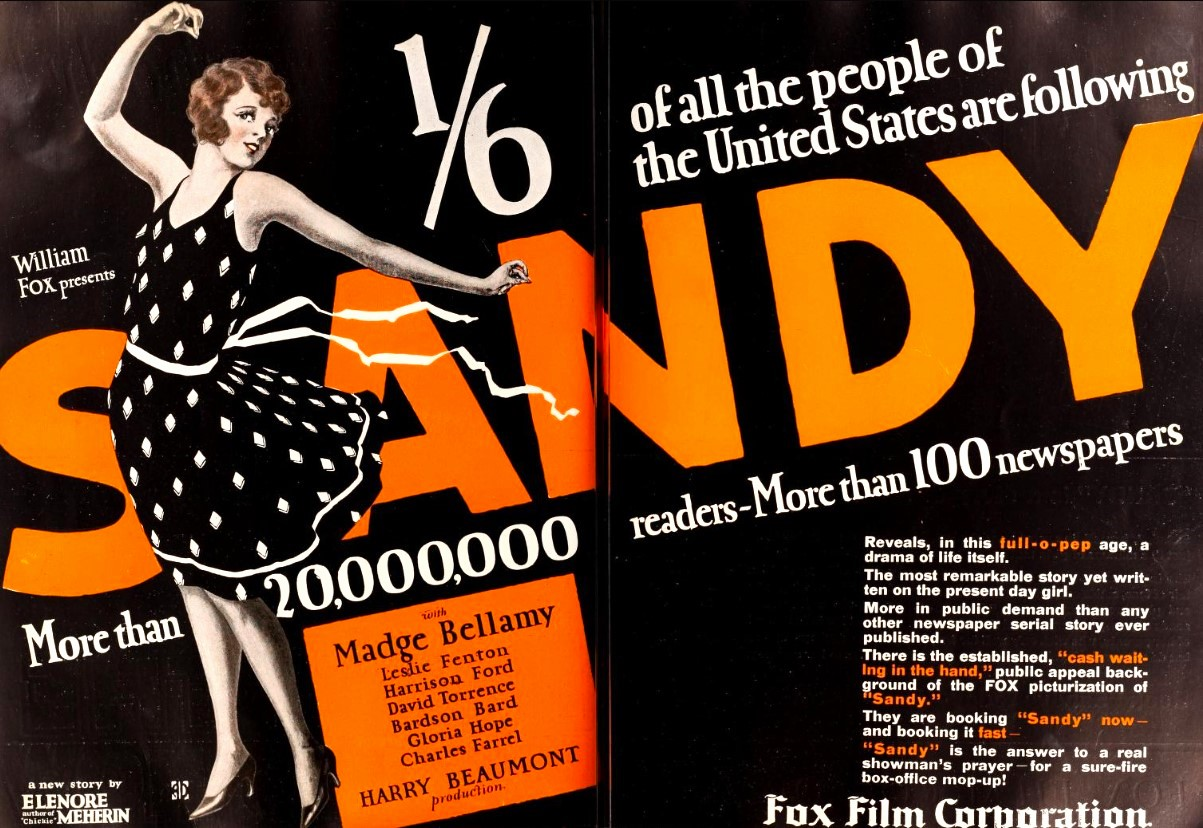
- Advertisement
- Directed by: Harry Beaumont
- Written by: Elenore Meherin (novel); Eve Unsell
- Produced by: William Fox
- Starring: Madge Bellamy; Leslie Fenton; Harrison Ford
- Cinematography: Rudolph J. Bergquist
- Production company: Fox Film
- Distributed by: Fox Film
- Release date: April 11, 1926
- Running time: 80 minutes
- Country: United States
- Language: Silent (English intertitles)

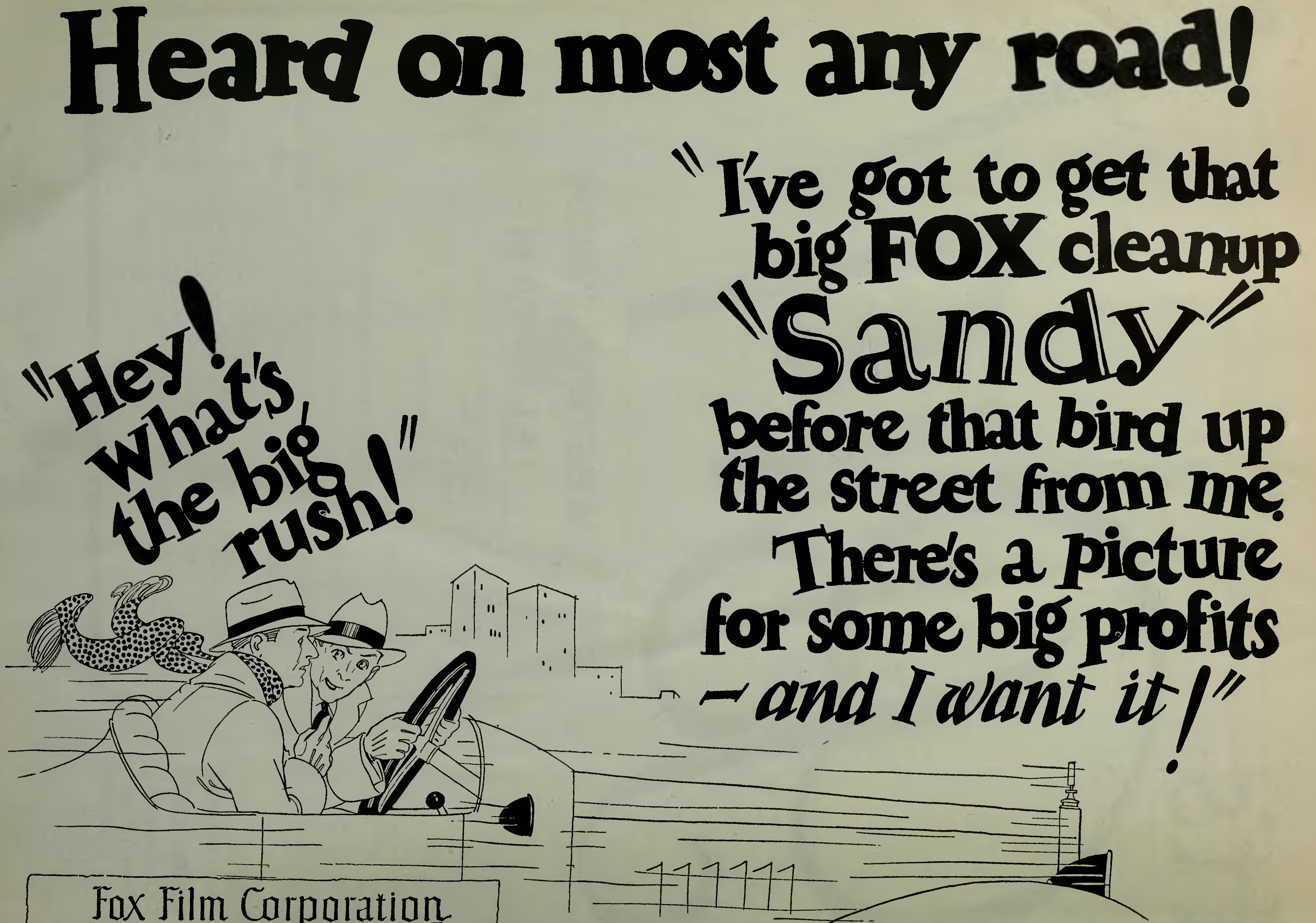
Sandy ad in The Film Daily, 1926

Sandy is a 1926 American silent drama film directed by Harry Beaumont and starring Madge Bellamy, Leslie Fenton, and Harrison Ford.

== Plot ==
As described in a film magazine, after the breakdown of her automobile places her in a compromising position, jazz-mad Sandy McNeil marries the wealthy Ben Murillo. Her husband’s cruelty results in the death of their baby. Sandy goes away for a rest and meets architect Ramon Worth, becoming so infatuated that she discards convention and lives with him happily until Judith Moore, a woman with whom he had an affair, appears. Sandy leaves and goes to her cousin Isabel McNeil, and soon has her cousin’s sweetheart Douglas Keith in love with her. Ramon appears and, when the young woman refuses to return to him, he shoots her and then kills himself. The cousin’s sweetheart Douglas decides to take the blame and is tried for murder. Sandy, learning of this, gets out of her sick bed to go to court and confesses. She reunites her cousin Isabel with her sweetheart and then dies, as the excitement was too much for her strength.

== Cast ==
- Madge Bellamy as Sandy McNeil
- Leslie Fenton as Douglas Keith
- Harrison Ford as Ramon Worth
- Gloria Hope as Judith Moore
- Ben Bard as Ben Murillo
- David Torrence as Angus McNeil
- Lillian Leighton as Isabel McNeil
- Charles Farrell as Timmy
- Charles Coleman as Bob McNeil
- Joan Standing as Alice McNeil

== Bibliography ==
- Solomon, Aubrey. The Fox Film Corporation, 1915-1935: A History and Filmography. McFarland, 2011.
