= The Rainbow Man =

1929 American musical drama film

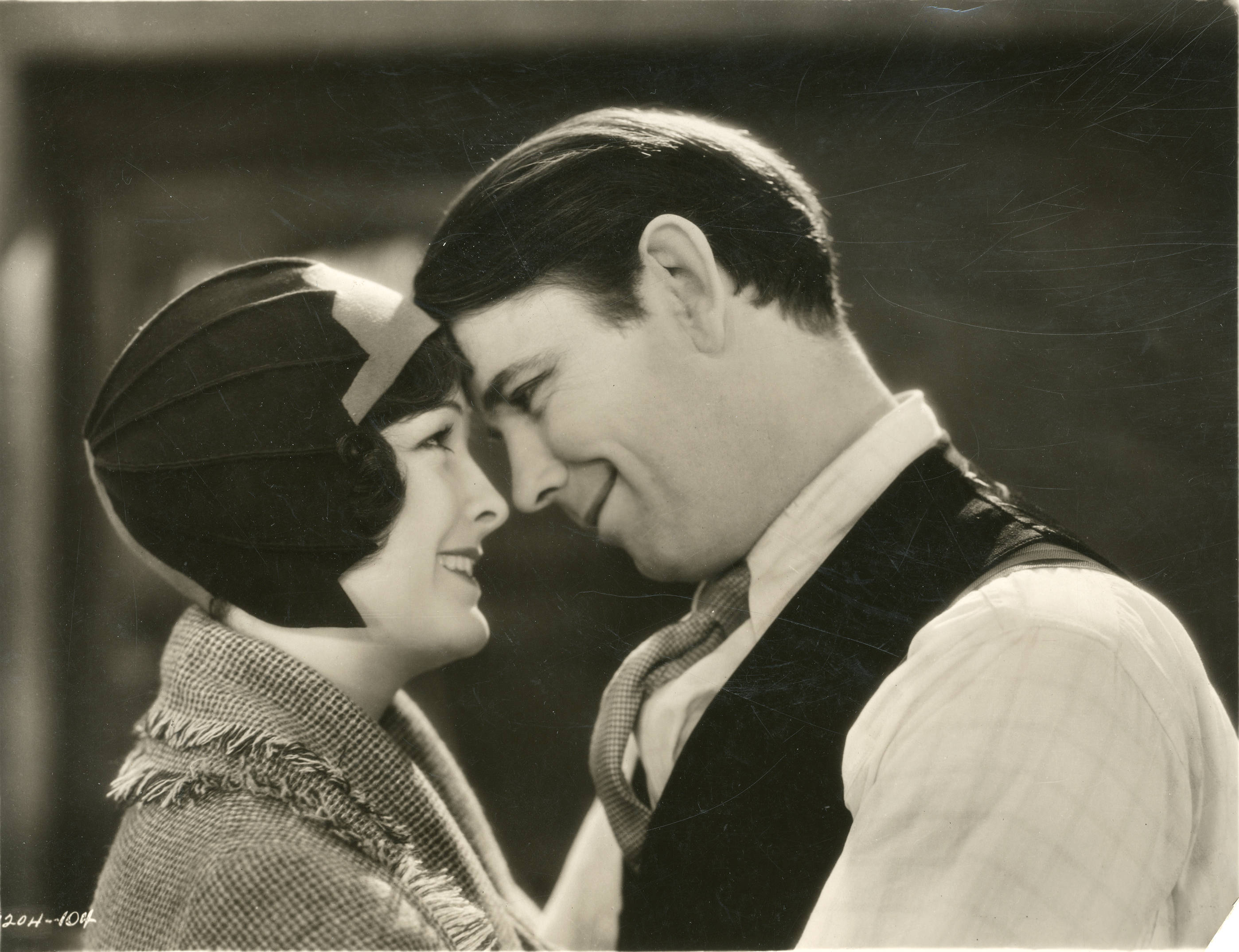
- Still with Nixon and Dowling
- Directed by: Fred C. Newmeyer
- Written by: Story: Eddie Dowling; Adaptation: Frances Agnew; Screenplay: Frances Agnew; Eddie Dowling
- Produced by: Eddie Dowling; George W. Weeks
- Starring: Eddie Dowling; Marian Nixon; Frankie Darro; Sam Hardy; Lloyd Ingraham; George 'Gabby' Hayes
- Cinematography: Jack MacKenzie
- Edited by: J.R. Crone
- Music by: Louis F. Gottschalk
- Production companies: George W. Weeks Productions; Sono Art-World Wide Pictures
- Distributed by: Paramount Pictures
- Release date: May 16, 1929
- Running time: 96 minutes
- Country: United States
- Language: English

The Rainbow Man (known as La valle delle rose in Italy) is a 1929 American pre-Code musical drama film directed by Fred C. Newmeyer. A copy of The Rainbow Man is preserved by the Library of Congress Packard Campus.

== Plot ==
According to film magazine, Rainbow Ryan, a minstrel performer, adopts Billy Ryan, the son of an acrobat friend who is killed while performing on stage. Playing in a small town, Rainbow falls in love with Mary Land, the daughter of a strict hotelkeeper who disapproves of all theatrical people. Rainbow moves on with the show, and Mary belatedly discovers that Billy is the child of her dead sister. Mary goes after Rainbow, and he sends Billy back home with her, renouncing his love for her for fear of going against her father's command that she has nothing to do with entertainers. The minstrel show is booked into a small town near Mary's, however, and Billy runs away to see Rainbow. Mary follows, and she and Rainbow are reunited.

== Cast ==
- Eddie Dowling as Rainbow Ryan
- Marian Nixon as Mary Lane
- Frankie Darro as Billy Ryan
- Sam Hardy as Doc Hardy
- Lloyd Ingraham as Colonel Lane
- George 'Gabby' Hayes as Bill (credited as George Hayes)
- Dannie Mac Grant as (uncredited)

== Soundtrack ==
- "Sleepy Valley"

Written by James F. Hanley and Andrew Sterling

- "Little Pal"

Written by James F. Hanley and Eddie Dowling

- "Rainbow Man"

Written by James F. Hanley and Eddie Dowling

== Critical response ==
A New York Times review stated that: "The Rainbow Man is an ingenuous stream of slow music and tears, with occasional interludes of more or less effective comedy. Those in the theatre laughed heartily at the fun, and for all one knows they may have shed tears over the distressing state of affairs that surround Rainbow Ryan (Mr. Dowling). Sometimes the incidents are reminiscent of ancient melodramas, for one perceives the most amazing coincidences throughout the picture."

== See also ==
- List of early sound feature films (1926–1929)
