= Love Hungry =

1928 film

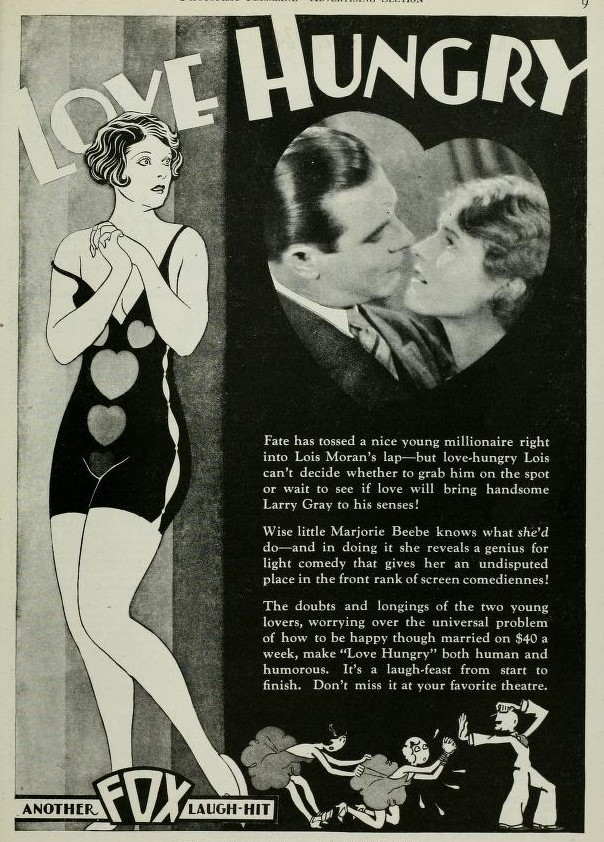
- Advertisement
- Directed by: Victor Heerman
- Screenplay by: Randall Faye; Frances Agnew
- Story by: Randall Faye; Victor Heerman
- Starring: Lois Moran; Lawrence Gray; Marjorie Beebe; Edythe Chapman; James Neill; John Patrick
- Cinematography: Glen MacWilliams
- Edited by: Alex Troffey
- Production company: Fox Film Corporation
- Distributed by: Fox Film Corporation
- Release date: April 8, 1928
- Running time: 56 minutes
- Country: United States
- Language: Silent (English intertitles)

Love Hungry is a 1928 American silent romantic comedy film directed by Victor Heerman and written by Randall Faye and Frances Agnew. The film stars Lois Moran, Lawrence Gray, Marjorie Beebe, Edythe Chapman, James Neill, and John Patrick. The film was released on April 8, 1928, by Fox Film Corporation.

== Cast ==
- Lois Moran as Joan Robinson
- Lawrence Gray as Tom Harver
- Marjorie Beebe as Mamie Potts
- Edythe Chapman as Ma Robinson
- James Neill as Pa Robinson
- John Patrick as Lonnie Van Hook

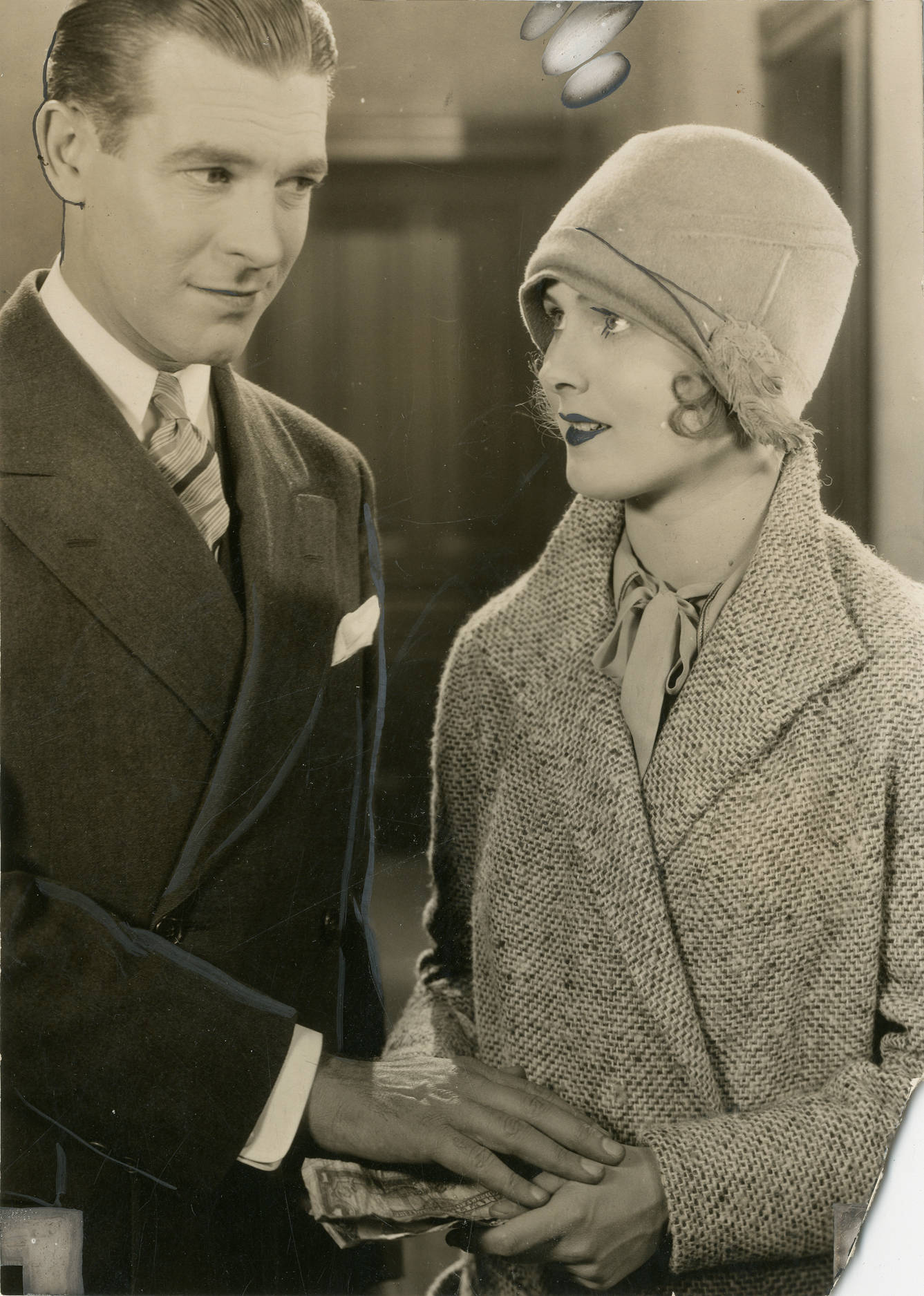

== Preservation ==
With no holdings located in archives, Love Hungry is considered a lost film.
