= Mary Duncan =

American stage and film actress (1894-1993)

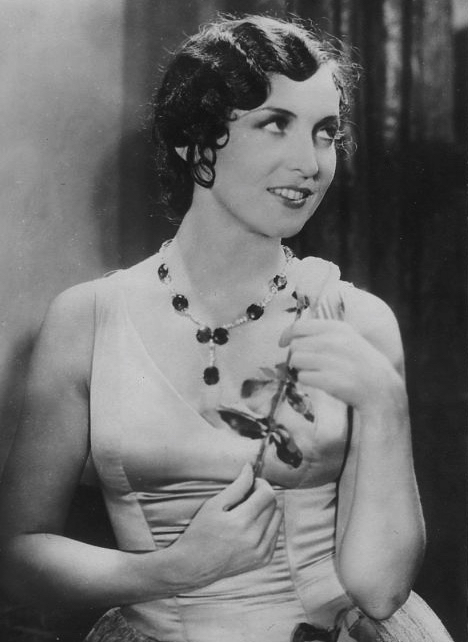
- Duncan, c. 1930
- Born: August 13, 1894; Luttrellville, Virginia U.S.
- Died: May 9, 1993 (aged 98); Palm Beach, Florida, U.S.
- Education: Cornell University
- Years active: 1927–1933
- Spouse: Stephen "Laddie" Sanford (1933–1977; his death)

Mary Duncan (August 13, 1894 – May 9, 1993) was an American stage and film actress. She is best known for her performances in F. W. Murnau's City Girl (1930) and Morning Glory (1933).

== Early years ==
Duncan was born in Luttrellville, Virginia, the sixth of eight children born to Capt. William S. Duncan and his wife. She attended Cornell University for two years (or one year) before settling on acting as a career. When she left Cornell, she studied acting under Yvette Guilbert.

== Career ==
Duncan began her career as a child actress playing on the Broadway stage from 1910. Her Broadway credits include Human Nature (1925), All Wet (1925), New Toys (1924), The Egotist (1922), Face Value (1921), and Welcome to Our City (1919). In 1926 she played "Poppy" in the smash hit and controversial play The Shanghai Gesture, in which Florence Reed played her mother (known as "Mother Goddam"). Reed's character kills her daughter in a startling end to the play. This play was turned into a very sanitized film in 1941 with Gene Tierney.

Duncan also starred in the 1930 film City Girl by director F. W. Murnau. After that, her career hit a lull. An article by Florabel Muir in the New York Daily News in 1931 began: "Mary Duncan was in Hollywood nearly all of last year looking for work with little or no luck. She even altered her appearance by having things done to her nose, but still the producers wouldn't give her a tumble."

Duncan's last film appearance was in the 1933 film Morning Glory, which starred Katharine Hepburn.

== Personal life ==
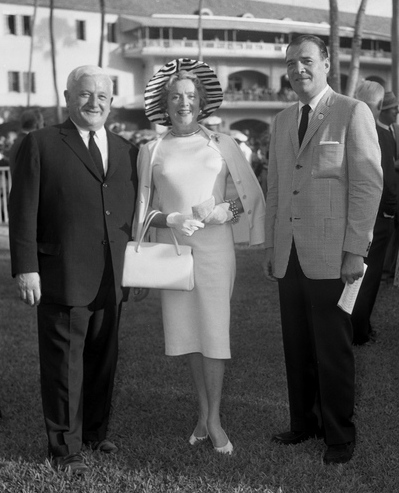
Mary Duncan pictured with Eugene Mori and Cmdr. Harold Crossman at Hialeah Race Track, 1958

On September 1, 1933, Duncan married Stephen "Laddie" Sanford, who was an international polo player as well as director of the Bigelow-Sanford Carpet Company, after which she retired from films. They remained married until his death in 1977. She spent much of her remaining years working with several major charities, and earned a reputation as a socialite in Palm Beach, Florida. She kept herself active by playing golf twice a week and swimming every morning before breakfast, which helped her maintain her size 8 figure. As an actress, she had followed the exercise tips of Sylvia of Hollywood to keep her shape.

== Death ==
Duncan died in her sleep aged 98. She was survived by a niece and great-niece. Duncan was the last known person to have in her possession a copy of the lost Murnau film 4 Devils; Martin Koerber, curator of Deutsche Kinemathek, has speculated that her heirs may still have the valuable print somewhere.

== Filmography ==
Year	Title	Role	Notes
1927	Very Confidential	Priscilla Travers	Lost film
1928	Soft Living	Lorna Estabrook	
1928	4 Devils	The Lady	Lost film
1929	The River	Rosalee	Incomplete film
1929	Thru Different Eyes	Viola	
1929	Romance of the Rio Grande	Carlotta	
1930	City Girl	Kate	
1930	Kismet	Zeleekha	Lost film
1930	The Boudoir Diplomat	Mona	
1931	Men Call It Love	Helen Robinson	
1931	Five and Ten	Muriel Preston	
1931	The Age for Love	Nina Donnet	
1932	State's Attorney	Nora Dean	
1932	Thirteen Women	June Raskob	
1932	The Phantom of Crestwood	Dorothy Mears	
1933	Morning Glory	Rita Vernon	(final film role)
