= Mother Knows Best (film) =

1928 film

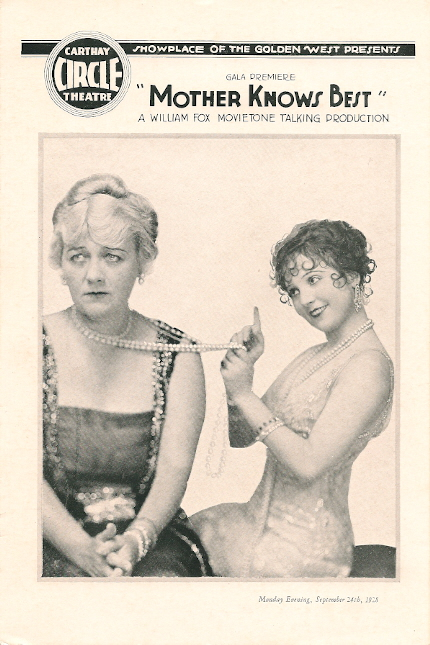
- Directed by: John G. Blystone; Charles Judels
- Written by: Edna Ferber
- Produced by: William Fox
- Starring: Madge Bellamy
- Cinematography: Gilbert Warrenton
- Edited by: Margaret Clancey
- Music by: William Kernell
- Production company: William Fox Studio
- Distributed by: Fox Film Corporation
- Release date: September 16, 1928
- Running time: 90 minutes
- Country: United States
- Languages: Sound (Part-Talkie); English (Intertitles)

Mother Knows Best is a lost 1928 American sound part-talkie film directed by John G. Blystone, based on a novel by Edna Ferber, fictionalizing the life of vaudevillian Elsie Janis. The film was Fox's first part talkie, using the Movietone sound system which had primarily been used for synchronised music scores and effects tracks in Fox features beforehand, although as early as Mother Machree (1928), a single synchronous singing sequence was included in the film. The talking sequences in Mother Knows Best were directed by actor Charles Judels, while the synchronized sequences were directed by John G. Blystone. The film starred Madge Bellamy, with Louise Dresser as her domineering mother, Barry Norton, and Albert Gran.

== Plot ==
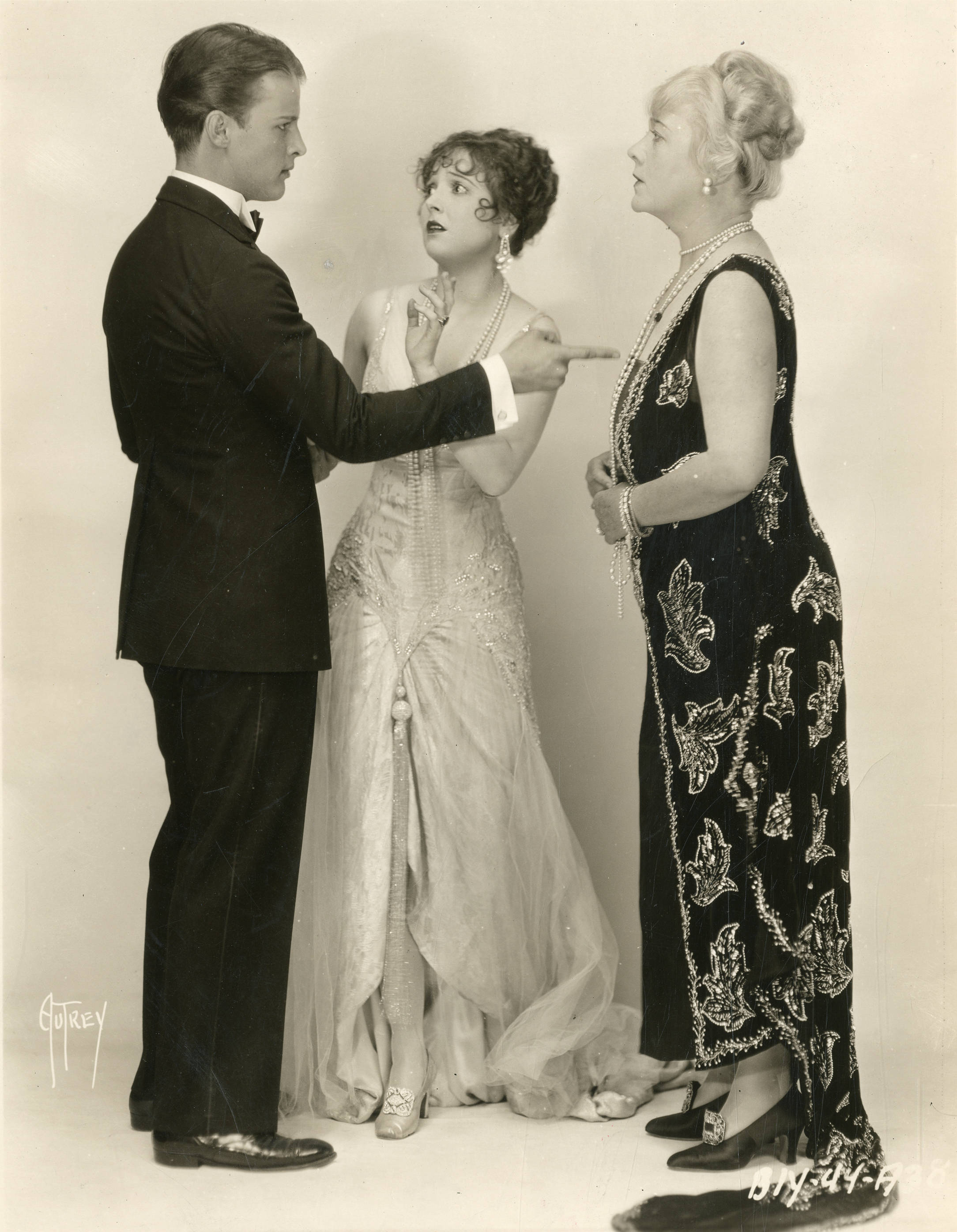

Ma Quail, a domineering and ambitious woman in a small Midwestern town, is determined to make her daughter a star. From childhood, Sally Quail is pushed into the world of show business. Ma takes money from the family drugstore run by Pa Quail to pay for Sally's dance and singing lessons, grooming her for the stage.

Sally performs in vaudeville as a mimic and impersonator, dazzling audiences with celebrity imitations and numbers like “I Just Can’t Make My Eyes Behave,” "My Mammy" and "She's Ma Daisy." Despite her growing fame, Ma continues to exert full control over her daughter’s life and career, refusing to let her develop independence or personal relationships.

When Sally falls in love with a gentle young composer, Ma forbids the relationship. The young man leaves, heartbroken. Sally, devastated by her mother's constant interference, breaks down under the emotional strain and becomes seriously ill.

A doctor confronts Ma, warning her that Sally’s collapse is the result of years of psychological pressure and sacrifice. Ma, shaken, begins to realize the damage she has done. She seeks out the composer and invites him back into their lives. He returns, and Ma welcomes him with open arms, leading him into the room where Sally lies near death.

The young man’s presence revives Sally’s will to live. As she recovers, Sally prepares to take the Broadway stage under her own name, finally free from her mother’s control. The film closes with Sally triumphant in her own right, performing before an adoring crowd as Ma watches from the wings.

== Cast ==
- Madge Bellamy as Sally Quail
  - Anne Shirley as Sally, as a child (uncredited)
- Louise Dresser as Ma Quail
- Barry Norton as Boy
- Albert Gran as Sam Kingston
- Alyce McCormick as Bessie (credited as Joy Auburn)
  - Annette De Kirby as Bessie, as a child
- Stuart Erwin as Ben
  - Ivor De Kirby as Ben, as a child
- Lucien Littlefield as Pa Quail
- Billy Schuler (uncredited)

== Music ==
The film featured a theme song entitled "Sally Of My Dreams" which was composed by William Kernell. In addition, Madge Bellamy sings three songs in the film. Dressed in kilts and carrying a crooked cane, she imitates Harry Lauder and sings "She's Ma Daisy" (Harry Lauder & J.D. Harper). Then, in blackface, she imitates Al Jolson and sings "My Mammy" (Walter Donaldson & Joe Young), and finally imitating Anna Held, while wearing an old-fashioned Victorian type long dress, she sings "I Just Can't Make My Eyes Behave" (Will D. Cobb and Gus Edwards).

== See also ==
- 1937 Fox vault fire
- List of early sound feature films (1926–1929)
