= Tennessee's Pardner =

1916 film

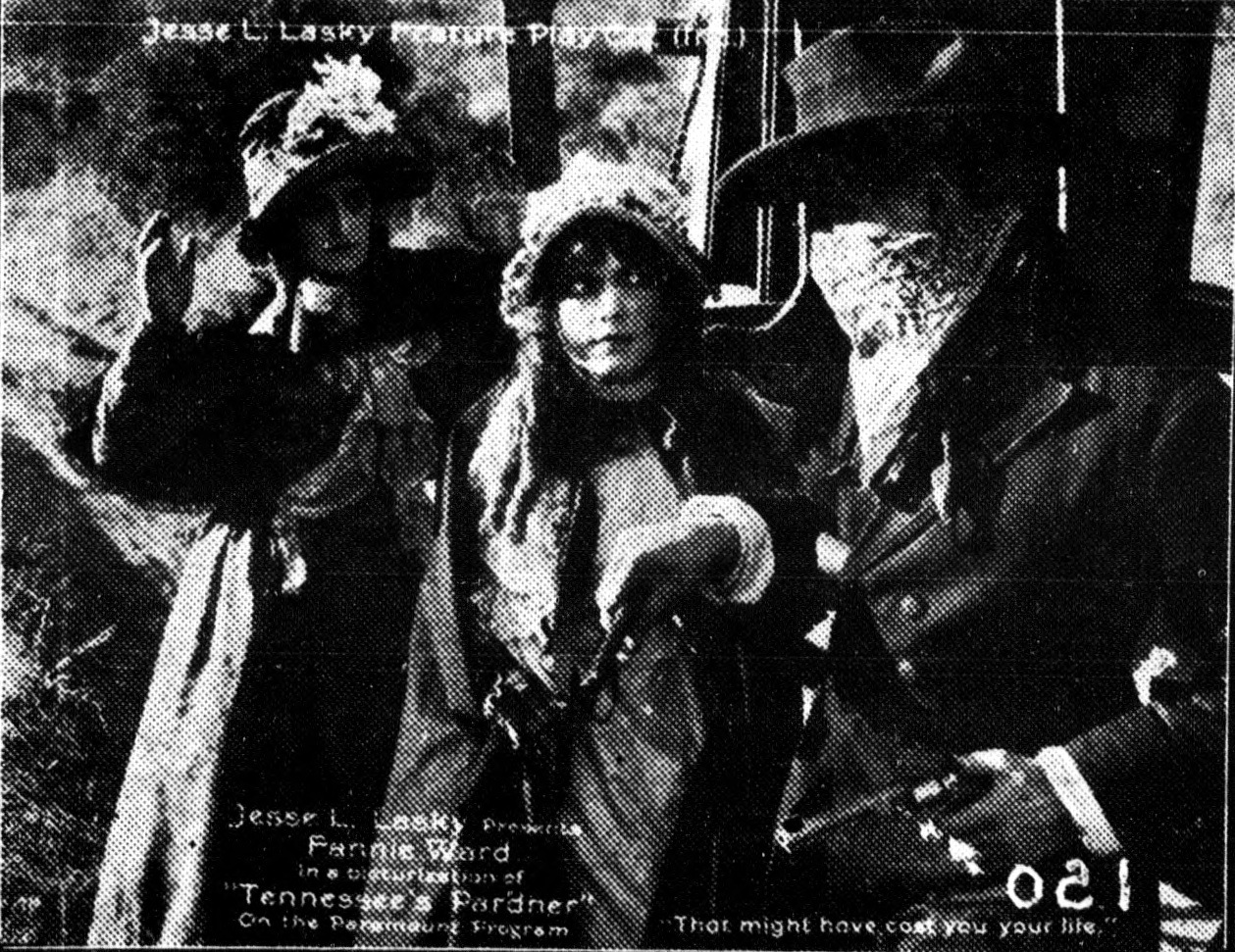
- Scene from the film
- Directed by: George Melford
- Screenplay by: Marion Fairfax
- Based on: "Tennessee’s Pardner" by Bret Harte
- Produced by: Jesse L. Lasky
- Starring: Fannie Ward; Jack Dean; Charles Clary; Jessie Arnold; Ronald Bradbury; Raymond Hatton
- Cinematography: Percy Hilburn
- Production company: Jesse L. Lasky Feature Play Company
- Distributed by: Paramount Pictures
- Release date: February 6, 1916
- Running time: 50 minutes
- Country: United States
- Languages: Silent; English intertitles

Tennessee's Pardner is a surviving 1916 American silent Western film directed by George Melford, written by Marion Fairfax, and starring Fannie Ward, Jack Dean, Charles Clary, Jessie Arnold, Ronald Bradbury, and Raymond Hatton. It was released February 6, 1916, by Paramount Pictures.

The film was based upon the 1869 Bret Harte story "Tennessee’s Pardner," which has also been filmed as The Flaming Forties (1924), The Golden Princess (1925), and Tennessee's Partner (1955).

== Premise ==
Tennessee, a young girl whose parents are separated on their journey to California. When her father is killed, she is left in the care of her father's friend.

== Cast ==
- Fannie Ward as Tennessee
- Jack Dean as Jack Hunter
- Charles Clary as Tom Romaine
- Jessie Arnold as Kate Kent
- Ronald Bradbury as Bill Kent
- Raymond Hatton as Gewilliker Hay
- James Neill as The Padre

== Preservation status ==
The film is preserved in the UCLA Film & Television Archive and/or the Library of Congress collection.
