= Madge Bellamy =

American actress (1899–1990)

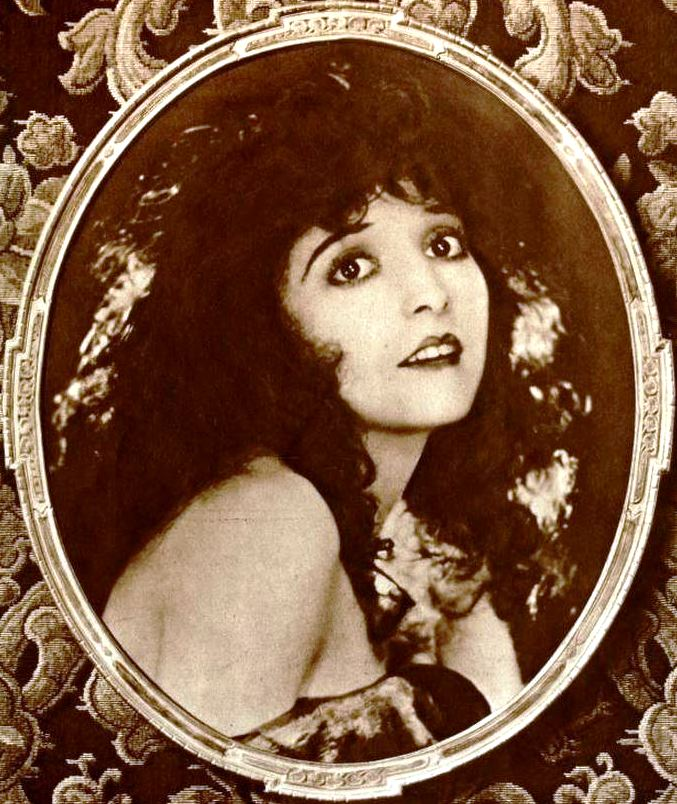
- Bellamy in Photoplay, May 1922
- Born: Margaret Derden Philpott; June 30, 1899; Hillsboro, Texas, U.S.
- Died: January 24, 1990 (aged 90); Upland, California, U.S.
- Resting place: Forest Lawn Memorial Park, Glendale
- Occupation: Actress
- Years active: 1917–1946
- Spouses: Carlos Bellamy (m. 1919; div. 1919); Logan F. Metcalf (m. 1928; div. 1928)

Madge Bellamy (born Margaret Derden Philpott; June 30, 1899 – January 24, 1990) was an American stage and film actress. She was a popular leading lady in the 1920s and early 1930s. Bellamy's career declined in the sound era and ended following a romantic scandal in the 1940s.

== Early life ==
Margaret Derden Philpott was born in Hillsboro, Texas on June 30, 1899 to William Bledsoe and Annie Margaret Derden Philpott. Bellamy was raised in San Antonio, Texas until she was six years old, and the family later moved to Brownwood, Texas, where her father worked as an English professor at Texas A&M.

As a child, Bellamy took dancing lessons and soon aspired to become a stage performer. She made her stage debut dancing in a local production of Aida, at the age of nine.

The Philpotts later moved to Denver, Colorado. Madge met and married Carlos Bellamy in Colorado, but they divorced when she decided to leave Colorado to pursue her acting career. In her autobiography, she later claimed that her agent suggested the name, possibly to avoid the scandal of divorce.

== Career ==
=== Early years ===
Shortly before she was to graduate from high school, Bellamy left home for New York City. She soon began working as a dancer on Broadway. After appearing in the chorus of The Love Mill (1917), Bellamy decided to try acting. In 1918, she appeared in a touring production of Pollyanna, for which she received good reviews. Bellamy's big break came when she replaced Helen Hayes in the Broadway production of Dear Brutus opposite William Gillette, in 1918. Bellamy also appeared in the touring production of Dear Brutus. While appearing in Dear Brutus, Bellamy was cast in a supporting role in her first film The Riddle: Woman (1920), starring Geraldine Farrar.

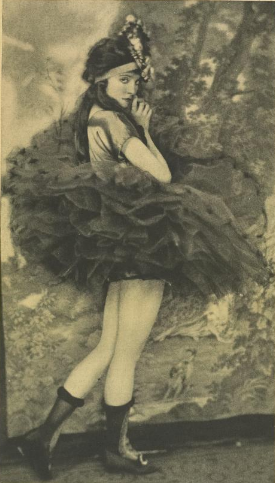
Bellamy photographed by Alfred Cheney Johnston, Shadowland, June 1921

After the tour of Dear Brutus ended, Bellamy joined a stock company in Washington D.C., where she appeared in Peg o' My Heart. While a member of the company, Bellamy shot a screen test for director Thomas H. Ince. In November 1920, she signed a three-year contract with Ince's newly formed Triangle Film Corporation. Bellamy's first film for Triangle was 1921's The Cup of Life, starring Hobart Bosworth.

=== Films ===
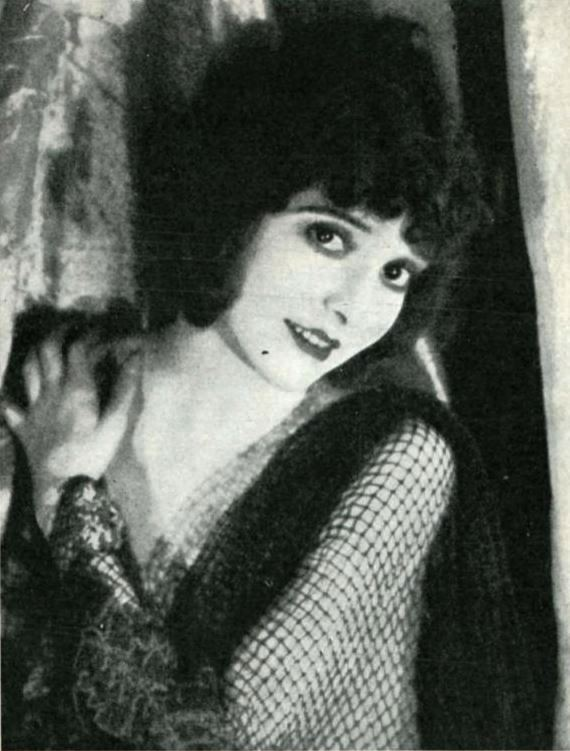
Madge Bellamy featured in The Tatler, May 1922

Bellamy's breakout role was as the title character in the 1922 film adaptation of the 1869 novel Lorna Doone. She thereafter became known as "the exquisite Madge" (Artist Penrhyn Stanlaws later called her "The Most Beautiful Girl in America"), and was cast in several melodramas by Ince. In 1924, Bellamy's contract with Ince ended and she signed with Fox Film Corporation where she would stay for the next five years. While at Fox, she appeared in two films for John Ford, The Iron Horse (1924) and Lightnin'. By 1925, Bellamy began encountering difficulties due to several "artistic differences" she had with studio executives. That year, she refused to accept a role in the highly successful silent epic Ben-Hur. She later attributed her career decline to her own choice of wanting to appear in light comedy and flapper roles that showcased her looks instead of more demanding roles.

In 1927, Fox executive Winfield Sheehan, with whom Bellamy was having an affair, attempted to cast her in the lead role of "Diane" in the romantic drama 7th Heaven. Bellamy later told author Anthony Slide that she was in fact cast as "Diane", but was replaced by Janet Gaynor (who won the first Academy Award for Best Actress for her work in the film) when she was in France shooting exterior shots. Bellamy instead appeared in the romantic comedy Very Confidential, in which she appeared as a model who impersonates a famous female sports figure. In 1928, Bellamy was cast in Fox's first part-talking film, Mother Knows Best. The film was an adaptation of Edna Ferber's novel of the same name and features Bellamy as Sally Quail, a stage performer whose life is dominated by her overbearing stage mother "Ma Quail" (Louise Dresser). In the musical sequences, Bellamy impersonated several popular performers of the day including Anna Held, Sir Harry Lauder, and Al Jolson singing "My Mammy" in blackface. Reviews for the film were generally positive with critics noting that Bellamy's voice was weak.

Bellamy's final silent film, Fugitives, was released in 1929. Her first full length, all-talking feature, Tonight at Twelve, was released later that year. By the time of its release, Bellamy's career had taken a severe downturn due to several ill-advised choices she made in fits of anger (fan magazines of the day called Bellamy "Miss Firecracker" on account of her temperament). Despite her poor behavior off-set, she was still a fairly popular performer and was named an "American Beauty" by the Hollywood Association of Foreign Correspondents.

In 1929, she walked out on her contract at Fox after refusing to star in the planned film adaptation of The Trial of Mary Dugan, a 1927 hit Broadway play by Bayard Veiller that the studio bought especially for Bellamy (the film was made later that year at Metro-Goldwyn-Mayer starring Norma Shearer). Bellamy later said of her career, "I got too big for my britches. I wanted too much money and when it was not forthcoming, I quit."

Bellamy attempted to find work as a freelance actress but did not work again until 1932 when she began appearing in Poverty Row films. One of her better known roles from this period was in the 1932 film White Zombie, opposite Bela Lugosi and directed by brothers Edward and Victor Hugo Halperin. The film was a moderate success but received mixed reviews while Bellamy's performance was generally panned by critics (In a 1970 letter to Classic Film Collector, Bellamy claimed her performance appeared bad because she had lost her voice due to a cold and was dubbed by another actress. This has since been proven false). She was slated to appear in the Halperin brothers' next film, Supernatural, but Carole Lombard was cast instead.

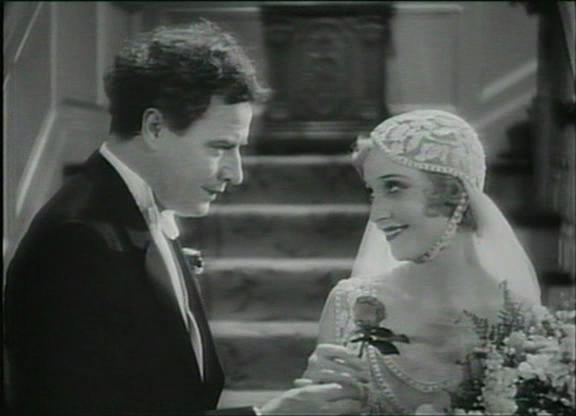
Robert Frazer and Bellamy in White Zombie, 1932

=== Career decline and scandal ===
By the early 1940s, Bellamy's career had virtually ended. She garnered considerable media attention when, on January 20, 1943, she was arrested in San Francisco and charged with assault with a deadly weapon after firing a .32 caliber revolver at her former lover, wealthy board chairman of the Pacific Lumber Company, Albert Stanwood Murphy, three times. Bellamy had been having an affair with Murphy for five years before he ended the relationship in October 1942. After learning that Murphy had married former model June Almy shortly after their breakup, Bellamy traveled to San Francisco to confront him and "... make him suffer somehow."

Bellamy later admitted that she waited around Murphy's apartment in the Nob Hill area for four days. She eventually spotted Murphy leaving the Pacific-Union Club on January 20. While Murphy was getting into his car, Bellamy fired three shots at him. She later said, "I wasn't within speaking distance [of Murphy], but he saw me and shouted something I didn't understand. Maybe it was 'don't.' Then I guess I shot at him. He ducked and ran." She fired three times, hitting Murphy's car twice while the third shot missed. Witnesses wrestled the gun out of her hand.

Shortly after the shooting, Bellamy claimed that she did not intend to harm Murphy and that she "... just wanted to see him. He wouldn't see me so I took the little gun with me. [...] I had had the little gun so long I thought it was just a toy." She was also quoted as saying, "I only winged him, which is what I meant to do. Believe me, I'm a crack shot". On February 11, 1943, Bellamy pleaded guilty to the lesser charge of violating a gun law and was given a suspended six-month sentence. She was also sentenced to one year of probation.

In July 1943, Bellamy sued Murphy for divorce in Las Vegas claiming that she and Murphy were married by "mutual consent" in April 1941 and had lived as husband and wife up until Murphy ended the relationship. She charged Murphy with "extreme mental cruelty" and asked for both temporary and permanent alimony. In December 1943, Albert Stanwood Murphy asked that the court dismiss the suit, stating that he and Bellamy "are not now and have never been husband and wife".

On January 4, 1944, a Nevada court denied Bellamy's divorce suit on the grounds that she and Murphy had never legally been married. One day after Bellamy's divorce case was dismissed, she was awarded a reported six-figure out-of-court settlement from Murphy.

The shooting and divorce filing generated publicity for Bellamy, but effectively ended her already fading career. She made her last screen appearance in Northwestern film Northwest Trail in 1945. Bellamy returned to the stage in 1946 in the Los Angeles production of Holiday Lady, after which she retired.

For her contributions to the film industry, Bellamy received a motion pictures star on the Hollywood Walk of Fame in 1960. The star is located at 6517 Hollywood Boulevard.

== Personal life ==
In 1919, Madge married Carlos Clark Bellamy (1894-1983) in Colorado.

In 1928, Bellamy was briefly married to bond broker Logan Fleming Metcalf (1891-1964). They married in Tijuana on January 24, 1928. They separated four days later. Metcalf filed for divorce claiming that while the two were on honeymoon, Bellamy had refused to speak to him because of his fondness for eating ham and eggs, which she considered "plebeian". Metcalf was granted a divorce on April 25, 1928.

By the time Bellamy retired from acting, she had squandered much of her fortune and lost the remaining money during the Depression. In her posthumously published autobiography, A Darling of the Twenties, Bellamy claimed that she lived in "abject poverty" after her retirement. She did, however, have some holdings in real estate and owned a retail shop in which she worked to support herself. In her spare time, Bellamy wrote screenplays and novels which were never purchased. In the early 1980s, she sold the retail shop for double the amount she had paid for it and lived in relative financial comfort for the rest of her life.

Bellamy remained out of public view until the 1980s, when film historians and silent film fans who had rediscovered her work began requesting interviews. She also began attending screenings of the low budget horror film White Zombie, which was a moderate success upon its initial release and has since become a cult classic.

Bellamy was an atheist and vegetarian. In her final years, Bellamy lived alone in Ontario, California.

== Death ==
Bellamy suffered from chronic heart problems toward the end of her life. On January 10, 1990, she checked into the San Antonio Community Hospital in Upland, California for treatment. She died there of heart failure on January 24 at the age of 90. Bellamy is buried at Forest Lawn Memorial Park in Glendale, California.

Her autobiography A Darling of the Twenties was published one month after her death.

== Filmography ==
Year	Title	Role	Notes
1920	The Riddle: Woman	Marie Meyer	Lost film
1921	The Cup of Life	Pain	Lost film
1921	Passing Through	Mary Spivins	Lost film
1921	Blind Hearts	Julia Larson	
1921	Love Never Dies	Tilly Whaley	
1921	The Call of the North	Virginia Albret	Lost film
1921	Hail the Woman	Nan Higgins	
1922	Lorna Doone	Lorna Doone	
1922	The Hottentot	Peggy Fairfax	Incomplete film
1923	Garrison's Finish	Sue Desha	
1923	Are You a Failure?	Phyllis Thorpe	Lost film
1923	Soul of the Beast	Ruth Lorrimore	
1924	No More Women	Peggy Van Dyke	Lost film
1924	Do It Now		Lost film
1924	The White Sin	Hattie Lou Harkness	
1924	Love's Whirlpool	Nadine Milton	
1924	His Forgotten Wife	Suzanne	
1924	Love and Glory	Gabrielle	Lost film
1924	The Fire Patrol	Molly Thatcher	
1924	The Iron Horse	Miriam Marsh	
1924	Secrets of the Night	Anne Maynard	
1924	On the Stroke of Three	Mary Jordan	Lost film
1925	A Fool and His Money	Countess von Pless	Lost film
1925	The Dancers	Una	
1925	The Parasite	Joan Laird	
1925	The Reckless Sex	Mary Hamilton	Lost film
1925	Wings of Youth	Madelyne Manners/Angela Du Bois	Lost film
1925	The Man in Blue	Teresa "Tita" Sartori	
1925	Lightnin'	Millie	
1925	Havoc	Tessie Dunton	Lost film
1925	Thunder Mountain	Azalea	Lost film
1925	Lazybones	Kit	
1925	The Golden Strain	Dixie Denniston	
1926	The Dixie Merchant	Aida Fippany	Lost film
1926	Sandy	Sandy McNeil	
1926	Black Paradise	Sylvia Douglas	Lost film
1926	Summer Bachelors	Derry Thomas	
1926	Bertha, the Sewing Machine Girl	Bertha Sloan	Lost film
1927	Ankles Preferred	Nora	
1927	The Telephone Girl	Kitty O'Brien	
1927	Colleen	Sheila Kelly	Lost film
1927	Very Confidential	Madge Murphy	Lost film
1927	Silk Legs	Ruth Stevens	Lost film
1928	Soft Living	Nancy Woods	
1928	The Play Girl	Madge Norton	Lost film
1928	Mother Knows Best	Sally Quail	Lost film
1929	Fugitives	Alice Carroll	
1929	Tonight at Twelve	Jane Eldridge	
1932	White Zombie	Madeline Short Parker	
1933	Riot Squad	Lil Daley	Alternative title: Police Patrol
1933	Gordon of Ghost City	Mary Gray	
1933	Gigolettes of Paris	Suzanne Ricord	
1934	Charlie Chan in London	Mrs. Fothergill	
1935	The Great Hotel Murder	Tessie	
1935	The Daring Young Man	Sally	
1935	Metropolitan	Woman in Negligee	Uncredited
1936	Champagne Charlie	Woman in Cab	Uncredited
1936	Under Your Spell	Miss Stafford	
1936	Crack-Up	Secretary	Uncredited
1945	Northwest Trail	Mrs. Yeager	

== Sources ==
- Ankerich, Michael G. (1993). Broken Silence: Conversations With 23 Silent Film Stars. McFarland & Co. ISBN 0-899-50835-9.
- Barrios, Richard (1995). A Song in the Dark: The Birth of the Musical Film. Oxford University Press. ISBN 0-195-08811-5.
- Bellamy, Joe David (2005). The Bellamys of Early Virginia. iUniverse. ISBN 0-595-67329-5.
- Bellamy, Madge (1989). A Darling of the Twenties: Madge Bellamy. Vestal Press. ISBN 978-0-911572-85-8.
- Crafton, Donald (1999). The Talkies: American Cinema's Transition to Sound, 1926-1931. Vol. 4. University of California Press. ISBN 0-520-22128-1.
- Dindle, Peter (2001). The Zombie Movie Encyclopedia. McFarland and Company. ISBN 0-7864-0859-6.
- Eagan, Daniel (2010). America's Film Legacy: The Authoritative Guide to the Landmark Movies in the National Film Registry. National Film Preservation Board. A&C Black. ISBN 978-0-826-42977-3.
- Ellenberger, Allan R. (2001). Celebrities in Los Angeles Cemeteries: A Directory. McFarland & Company Incorporated Pub. ISBN 0-786-40983-5.
- Lamparski, Richard (1989). Whatever Became Of-- ? All New Eleventh Series: 100 Profiles of the Most-asked-about Movie, TV, and Media Personalities, Hundreds of Never-before-published Facts, Dates, Etc. on Celebrities, 227 Then-and-now Photographs. Crown Publishers. ISBN 0-517-57150-1.
- Liebman, Roy (1998). From Silents to Sound: A Biographical Encyclopedia of Performers who Made the Transition to Talking Pictures. McFarland. ISBN 0-786-40382-9.
- Lowe, Denise (2014). An Encyclopedic Dictionary of Women in Early American Films: 1895-1930. Routledge. ISBN 978-1-317-71896-3.
- Rhodes, Gary D. (2001). White Zombie: Anatomy of a Horror Film. McFarland. ISBN 1-476-60491-6.
- Slide, Anthony (2010). Silent Players: A Biographical and Autobiographical Study of 100 Silent Film Actors and Actresses. University Press of Kentucky. ISBN 978-0-813-12708-8.
- Soister, John T. (2012). American Silent Horror, Science Fiction and Fantasy Feature Films, 1913-1929. McFarland. ISBN 978-0-786-48790-5.
- Solomon, Aubrey (2001). The Fox Film Corporation, 1915-1935: A History and Filmography. McFarland. ISBN 0-786-48610-4.
- Willis, John (1991). John Willis' Screen World, Volume 42. Crown.
