= Frances Agnew =

American screenwriter

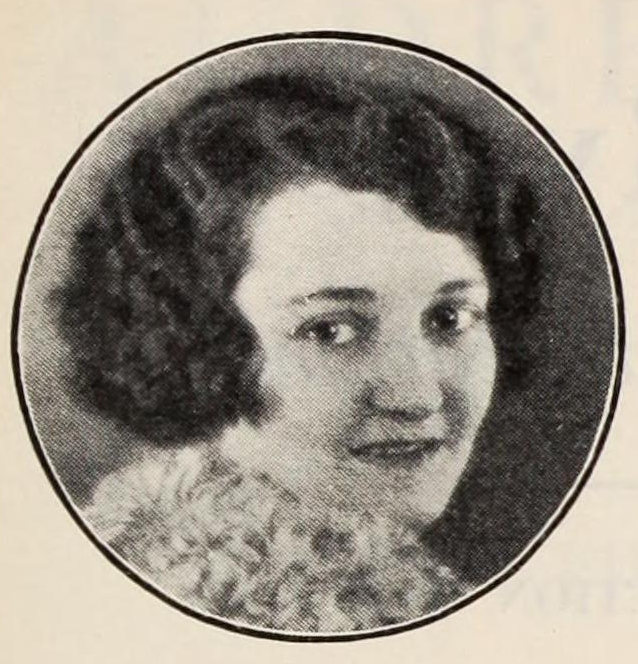
- Agnew, Film Daily's Film Year Book 1926
- Born: Frances C. Scheuing; July 1, 1891; Anniston, Alabama, USA
- Died: January 3, 1967 (aged 75); Los Angeles, California, USA
- Occupation(s): Screenwriter, journalist

Frances Agnew (born Frances Scheuing) was an American screenwriter active during the 1920s.

== Biography ==
Frances—known as Fanny Mae to family and friends—was born in Anniston, Alabama, in 1891. She was the daughter of Harry Scheuing and Elizabeth Hocking; she had four brothers.

The family eventually relocated to New York City, where Frances became a journalist at The New York Telegraph. In 1913, she appeared as an Indian Maid in a photoplay called Picnic in Dakota. She recorded her appearance in her 1913 book, Motion Picture Acting.

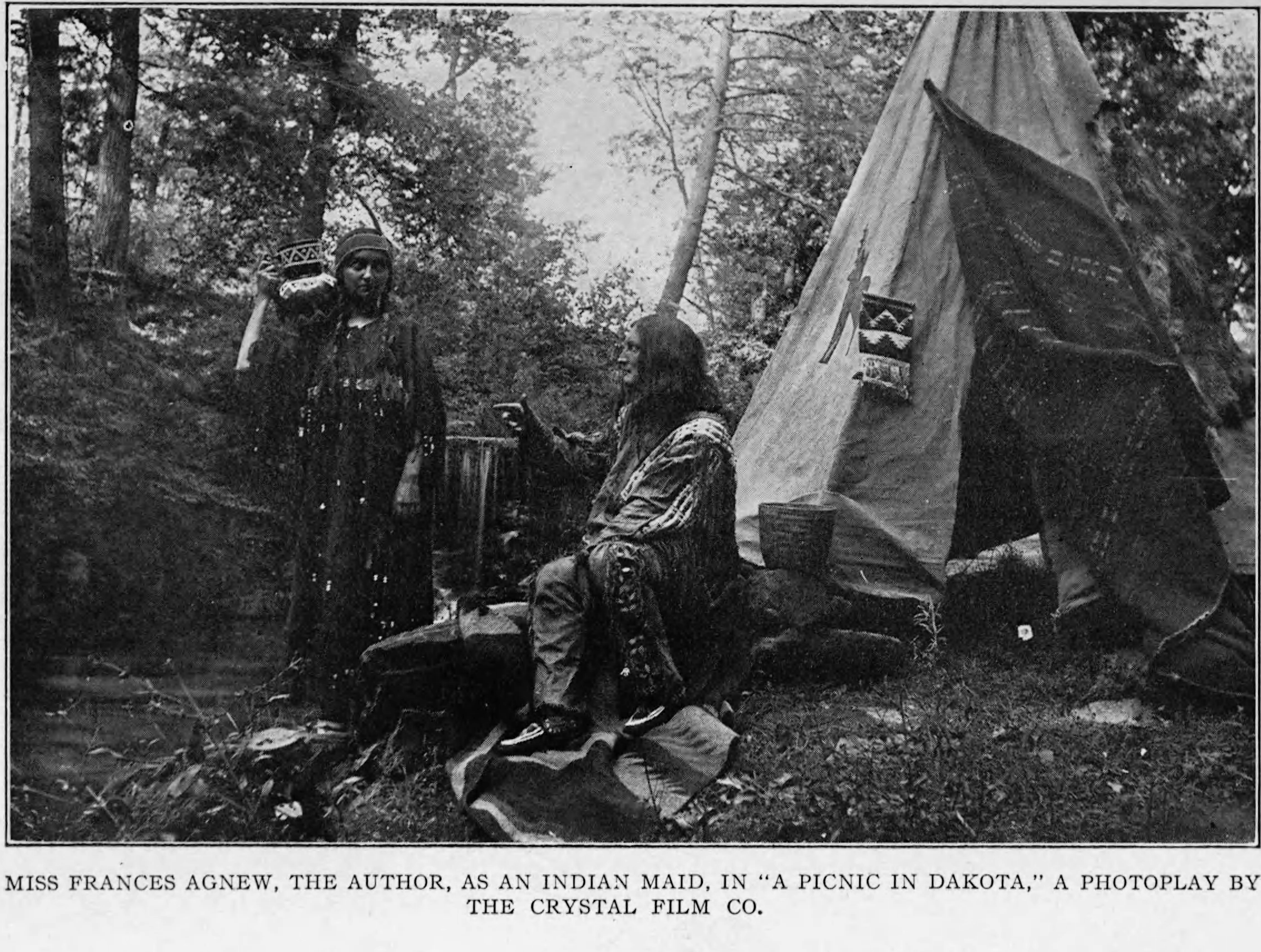
Frances Agnew in the 1913 photoplay "Picnic in Dakota" as the Indian Maid

In 1920, she moved to Los Angeles to cover entertainment for the publication after her co-worker, Margaret Ellinger, quit to become a scenarist for actress Bessie Love.

While on a European vacation in Rome, she caught up with the Ben Hur crew and was intrigued by the idea of writing movies. In 1924, she left the newspaper business behind (for a while, anyway) when she was hired on at Paramount's Betty Bronson unit to write scenarios. One of her first screenplays was the 1925 adaptation of Alice Duer Miller's Saturday Evening Post story "Are Parents People?" In 1926, she left Paramount to sign a contract with MGM. She also worked for First National and Fox for a time.

In 1926, she was charged by Allan Dwan to do an uncredited re-titling and re-editing of his film Summer Bachelors, and at this time became more interested in the idea of editing. She continued writing and working on films through the end of the decade, working on scripts for films like The Joy Girl, Silk Legs, Syncopation, and The Rainbow Man.

By 1932, she had returned to working as a newspaper columnist, writing about the state of the film industry for publications like The Los Angeles Times. She also wrote plays like Apples in Eden during the 1940s.

During her later years, she was plagued by health troubles, including a broken hip sustained during a fall. She successfully sued her former physician and was awarded a hefty settlement after a jury agreed that her doctor's misdiagnosis had caused her permanent weakness in one of her legs.

She died in Los Angeles on January 3, 1967. She had no children and never married.

== Selected filmography ==
- Picnic in Dakota (actor)
- The Rainbow Man (1929) (screenplay)
- Syncopation (1929)
- None But the Brave (1928)
- Love Hungry (1928)
- Soft Living (1928)
- Silk Legs (1927)
- The Joy Girl (1927)
- Summer Bachelor (1926) (uncredited) (also editor)
- Paradise (1926)
- Mannequin (1926)
- The Golden Princess (1925)
- Are Parents People? (1925)
