= John Chaffee and Jason Chamberlain =

John Chaffee
- Born: John Amos Chaffee; 1823; Woodstock, Connecticut, U.S.
- Died: July 31, 1903 (aged 79–80); San Francisco, California, U.S.
- Occupation: Gold miner
- Partner: Jason Chamberlain

Jason Chamberlain
- Born: Jason Palmer Chamberlain; 1821; Windsor County, Vermont, U.S.
- Died: October 16, 1903 (aged 81); Groveland, California, U.S.
- Cause of death: Self-inflicted gunshot wound
- Occupation: Gold miner
- Partner: John Chaffee

John Chaffee and Jason Chamberlain were gold miners in California who lived together for over 50 years. Referred to as the "wedded bachelors", they are a well-documented example in early American history of a male same-sex couple living in a relationship similar to marriage. There is some evidence they were the inspiration for Bret Harte's gold rush era story Tennessee's Partner and they are part of the local lore of Tuolumne county where they lived.

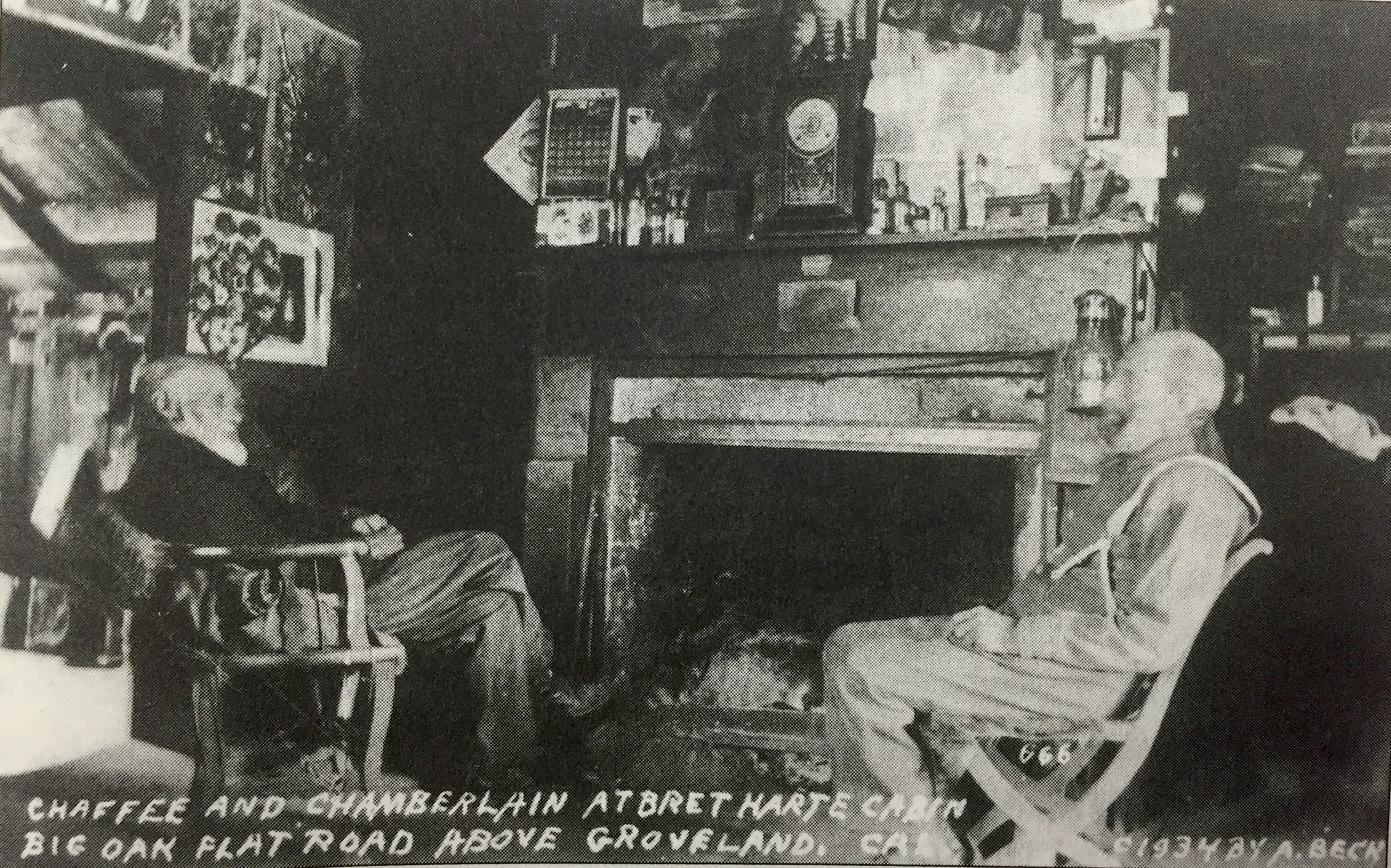
In their cabin in Second Garrote, Groveland, CA circa 1890.

== Life ==
Jason Palmer Chamberlain was born in 1821 in Windsor County, Vermont and lived in Massachusetts and Connecticut during his childhood and early adulthood, working as a carpenter. In Worcester, Massachusetts, he met John Amos Chaffee who worked there as a wheelwright. John was two years younger, born in 1823 in Woodstock, Connecticut.

On January 24, 1849, Chaffee and Chamberlain left Boston together. Their 176-day trip aboard the Capitol brought them around South America's Cape Horn to San Francisco. At the height of the gold rush, San Francisco was experiencing an unprecedented population and economic boom; upon arriving in the city, they both found jobs that paid 7 times their equivalent jobs on the east coast.

Despite the stable jobs and good pay, they left together for Calaveras County to try their luck at gold mining on the Mokelumne River. Chamberlain later wrote: "We … then were so stricken with the mining fever and at times I think it as the worst move we ever made in leaving the City so full of bustle and business for the uncertainty of the mines."

In the winter season, they turned back to San Jose, working carpentry jobs and returning the next year again to mining with only moderate success. At last, in 1853, they settled in Second Garrotte, a small rural settlement in Groveland, Tuolumne County, where Chaffee focused on mining and Chamberlain farmed and maintained an apple orchard.

The pair lived at this spot for the next 50 years, later building their own house and furniture and opening a way station for travelers. They befriended a few of the local Miwok Native Americans and were well respected by their neighbors. They shared their food, labor, and money. Neither married and there is no evidence in their own extensive writings or those about them that they had or desired any female companions. However, many travelers left comments in the guest book that offer some insight into the men's relationships:

"The artistic inclination of these gentlemen is quit apparent tho which one is the 'ladies man' we could not discover, each modestly declining the honor"

"On Our Trip to the Yosemite Providence directed us to the Cheerful Cabin of Messrs Chamberlain and Chaffee Two Characteristic '49ers' whose attachment to each other has the true 'Damon and Pythias' ring, that touches sentiments so welcome May their ‘Golden Wedding’ to be celebrated in 1899 be a crowning event to their long history of Hospitality"

== Death and aftermath ==
In June 1903, Chaffee was afflicted with a painful skin disease. He accompanied a professor friend to San Francisco to receive treatment. This was the last time the two were to see each other. A guest at the cabin wrote of Chamberlain, "His meditative, absent look, and day dreams indicate that his mind, thought, anxiety are in Chaffee while he lingers in the East Bay Sanatorium at Oakland. A love could not miss his sweetheart more."

Chaffee died on July 31, 1903, and Chamberlain (now 81 years old) received word via the mail on August 2, 1903. In October 16, 1903, Jason’s lifelong diary ends - he shot himself in the head with a shotgun on his front porch, tying the trigger to his toe with a length of string. According to their neighbor, they had planned to be buried side by side, though this was not carried out. Jason was buried at Divide Cemetery, Groveland and John buried in Oakland.
