= Romance of the Rio Grande (1929 film) =

1929 film

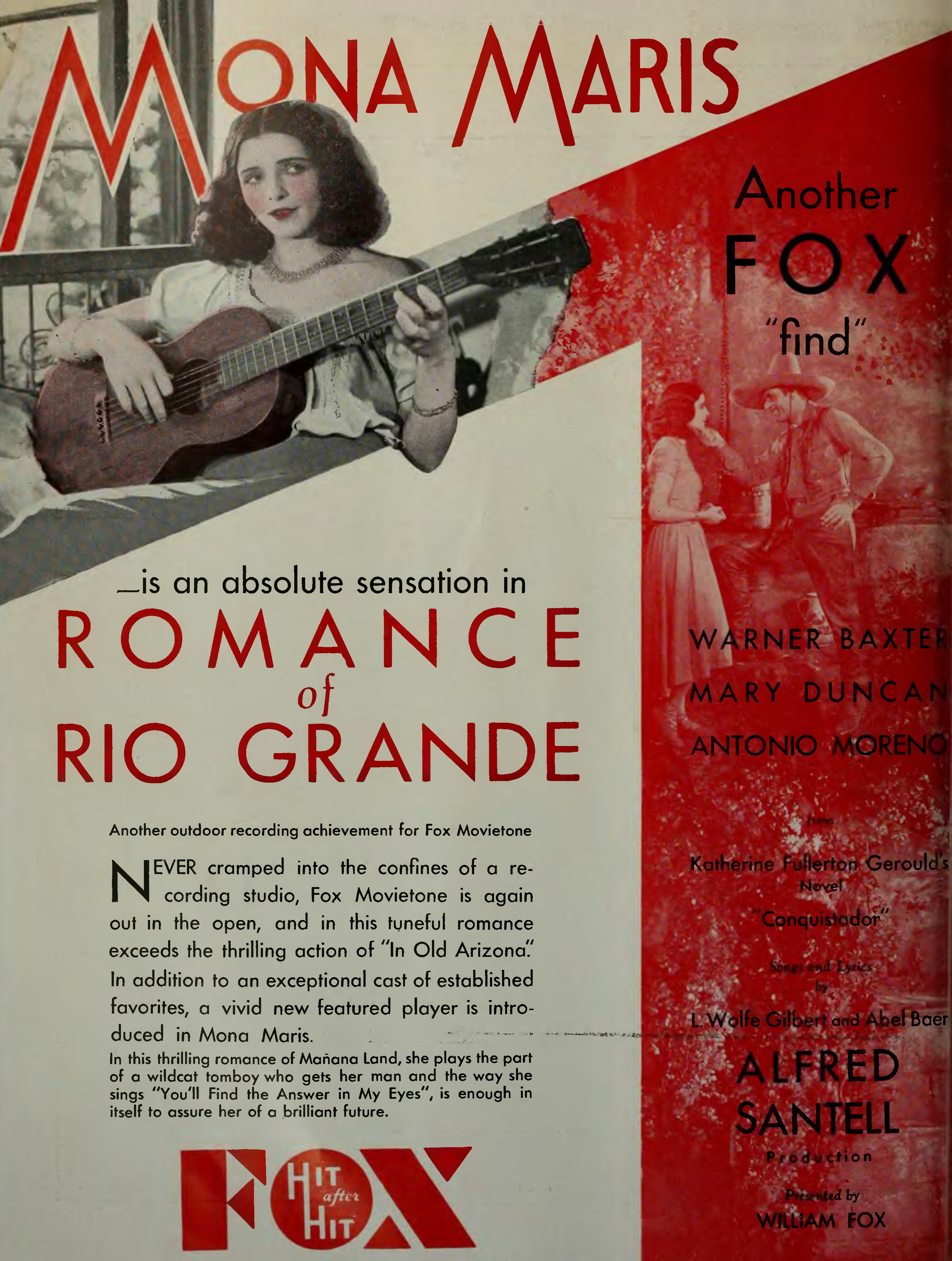
- Directed by: Alfred Santell
- Written by: Marion Orth
- Based on: Conquistador by Katharine Fullerton Gerould
- Produced by: William Fox
- Starring: Warner Baxter
- Cinematography: Arthur Edeson
- Edited by: Paul WeatherwaxG
- Music by: Abel Baer; L. Wolfe Gilbert
- Distributed by: Fox Film Corporation
- Release date: November 17, 1929
- Running time: 93-94 minutes
- Country: United States
- Languages: English (sound version); English intertitles (silent version)

Romance of the Rio Grande (also: En kärleksnatt vid Rio Grande) is a 1929 American sound (All-Talking) pre-Code Western musical film directed by Alfred Santell and starring Warner Baxter, Mona Maris, Mary Duncan, and Antonio Moreno. Based upon the novel Conquistador by Katharine Fullerton Gerould, it was produced and distributed by the Fox Film Corporation in both a Movietone talking version and also a silent version.

== Cast ==
- Warner Baxter as Pablo Wharton Cameron
- Mona Maris as Manuelita
- Mary Duncan as Carlotta
- Antonio Moreno as Juan
- Robert Edeson as Don Fernando
- Agostino Borgato as Vincente
- Albert Roccardi as Padre Miguel
- Charles Byer as Dick Rivers
- Majel Coleman as Dorry Wayne
- Merrill McCormick as Luca

== See also ==
- List of early sound feature films (1926–1929)
