= 4 Devils =

1928 film by F. W. Murnau

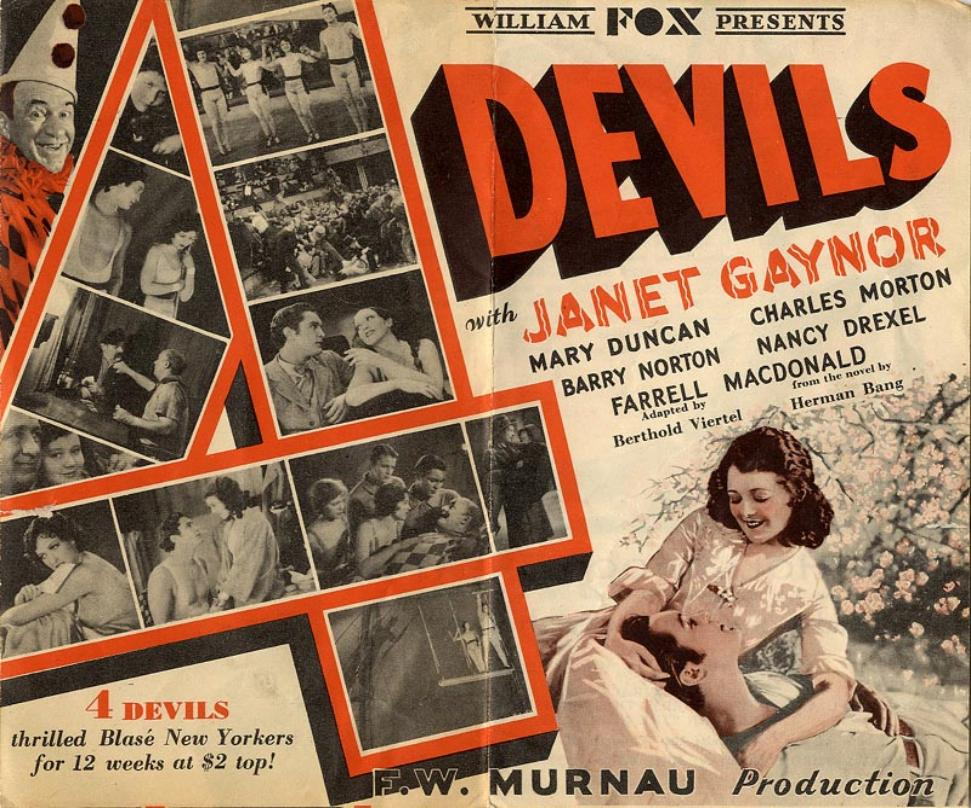
- Advertisement
- Directed by: F. W. Murnau
- Written by: Carl Mayer
- Based on: "Les Quatre Diables" by Herman Bang
- Produced by: William Fox
- Starring: Janet Gaynor; Charles Morton; Mary Duncan; Barry Norton
- Cinematography: L. William O'Connell; Ernest Palmer
- Music by: Ernö Rapée; Lew Pollack
- Production company: William Fox Studio
- Distributed by: Fox Film Corporation
- Release dates: October 3, 1928 (Synchronzied Version); June 15, 1929 (Part-Talkie Version)
- Running time: 100 minutes (Part-Talkie Version); 97 minutes (Synchronized Version)
- Country: United States
- Languages: Sound film (Synchronized); English Intertitles

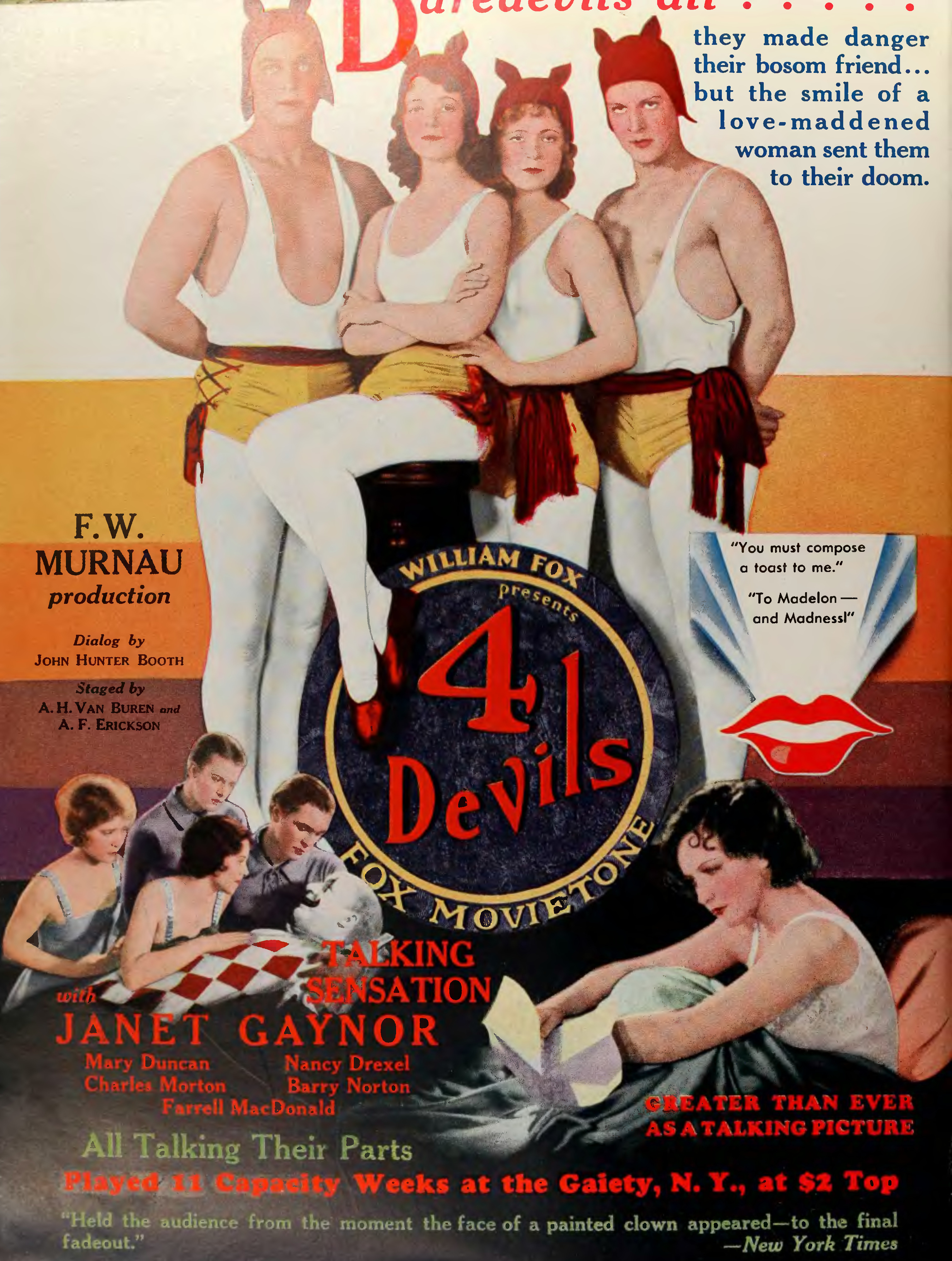
4 Devils ad in The Film Daily, 1929

4 Devils (also known as Four Devils) is a lost 1928 American synchronized sound drama film directed by German director F. W. Murnau and starring Janet Gaynor. While the 1928 version of the film had no audible dialog, it was released with a synchronized musical score with sound effects using the sound-on-film movietone process. The synchronized version had only a limited release. The film was withdrawn to add talking sequences and the final part-talkie version was released to theatres in June 1929. Both versions appear to be lost.

== Plot ==
In the grim world of small-time circus life, two young boys, Charles and Adolf, are brought to the cruel, drunken circus owner Cecchi by an elderly woman who can no longer care for them. Their father, she says, had been an acrobat, and she hopes Cecchi will train them. Under Cecchi’s harsh regime they are joined by two little girls, Marion and Louise, who are cared for by a kindly, aging clown. Seeing the children’s potential, the old clown eventually rescues all four from Cecchi’s brutality, taking them under his wing.

Over the years, the quartet become expert trapeze artists. Billed as The Four Devils, they perform death-defying acts with flawless skill and a bond born of shared hardship. By the time they reach Paris and join the prestigious Cirque Olympia, Charles and Marion are engaged, and Adolf and Louise are also sweethearts. Their foster father has retired from the ring, living comfortably on the earnings of his beloved protégés.

But into this harmony comes The Lady, a wealthy, cosmopolitan seductress with a taste for dangerous liaisons. Fascinated by the handsome Charles, she uses her charm, her eyes, and her wealth to lure him away from Marion. Charles, flattered and intoxicated, begins visiting her apartment regularly, neglecting both his fiancée and his place in the troupe.

Marion, devoted and trusting, begins to notice his absence. Her heartbreak deepens when she confirms his visits to The Lady. She tries to follow him but cannot win him back. The emotional strain begins to affect her concentration in their high-risk work. Meanwhile, The Lady, though coldly amused by her rival, treats the affair as a passing diversion.

As the season draws to a close, the Cirque Olympia plans a spectacular finale: the Leap of Death, performed without a safety net. On the climactic night, Charles tells Marion he still loves her and intends to return to her. But during the performance, Marion sees The Lady seated in the audience. Her strength falters; her despair overwhelms her. She misses her grip and plunges toward the sawdust. The act is halted as Charles and the others rush to her side.

Marion survives the fall, and Charles, shaken by the near-tragedy, renounces The Lady. After Marion recovers, she and Charles leave the circus world behind, planning a new life together.

== Cast ==
- Janet Gaynor as Marion
  - Anne Shirley as Marion as a girl (billed as Dawn O'Day)
- Mary Duncan as The Lady
- Anders Randolf as Cecchi
- Barry Norton as Adolf
  - Philippe De Lacy as Adolf as a child
- Charles Morton as Charles
  - Jack Parker as Charles as a child
- André Cheron as Old Roue
- George Davis as Mean Clown
- Nancy Drexel as Louise
  - Anita Louise as Louise as a child
- Wesley Lake as Old Clown
- J. Farrell MacDonald as The Clown
- Claire McDowell as Woman

== Music ==
The film featured two theme songs titled "Marion" and "Destiny" which were both composed by Erno Rapee and Lew Pollack.

== Production ==
4 Devils was released by Fox Film Corporation and was produced by William Fox, who had hired Murnau to come to the United States. It was initially released without dialogue with a synchronised music score and sound effects in October 1928, and grossed $100,000 in New York City, but because of the talkie picture craze, Fox pulled it from distribution and ordered sound to be added. A 25% talking version, incorporating "synchronised sound effects, music and dialogue sequences", was made without Murnau's cooperation.

== Preservation status ==
No copies of either version of the film are known to exist, and 4 Devils remains among the most sought after lost films of the early sound era. Details of the movie can be found on the DVD for Sunrise, released by Fox as part of their 20th Century Fox Studio Classics collection.

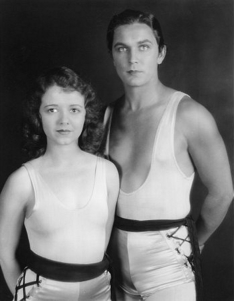
Janet Gaynor and Charles Morton

Film historian and collector William K. Everson stated that the only surviving print was lost by actress Mary Duncan, who had borrowed it from Fox Studios. Martin Koerber, curator of Deutsche Kinemathek, is more hopeful, writing that the print was given to Duncan, and that her heirs, if any, may yet have it.

In 2003 the documentary short Murnau's 4 Devils: Traces of a Lost Film by film historian Janet Bergstrom was released, showing a reconstruction using stills, drawings, sketches and script drafts.

== Other adaptations ==
The source novella by Herman Bang was first adapted into film in 1911 by Robert Dinesen and Alfred Lind, and finally in 1985 by Anders Refn. The screenplay for the 1928 film was novelized by Guy Fowler and published that year by Grosset & Dunlap as a hardcover photoplay (movie tie-in) edition.

== See also ==
- List of early sound feature films (1926–1929)
