= Paradise (1926 film) =

1926 film

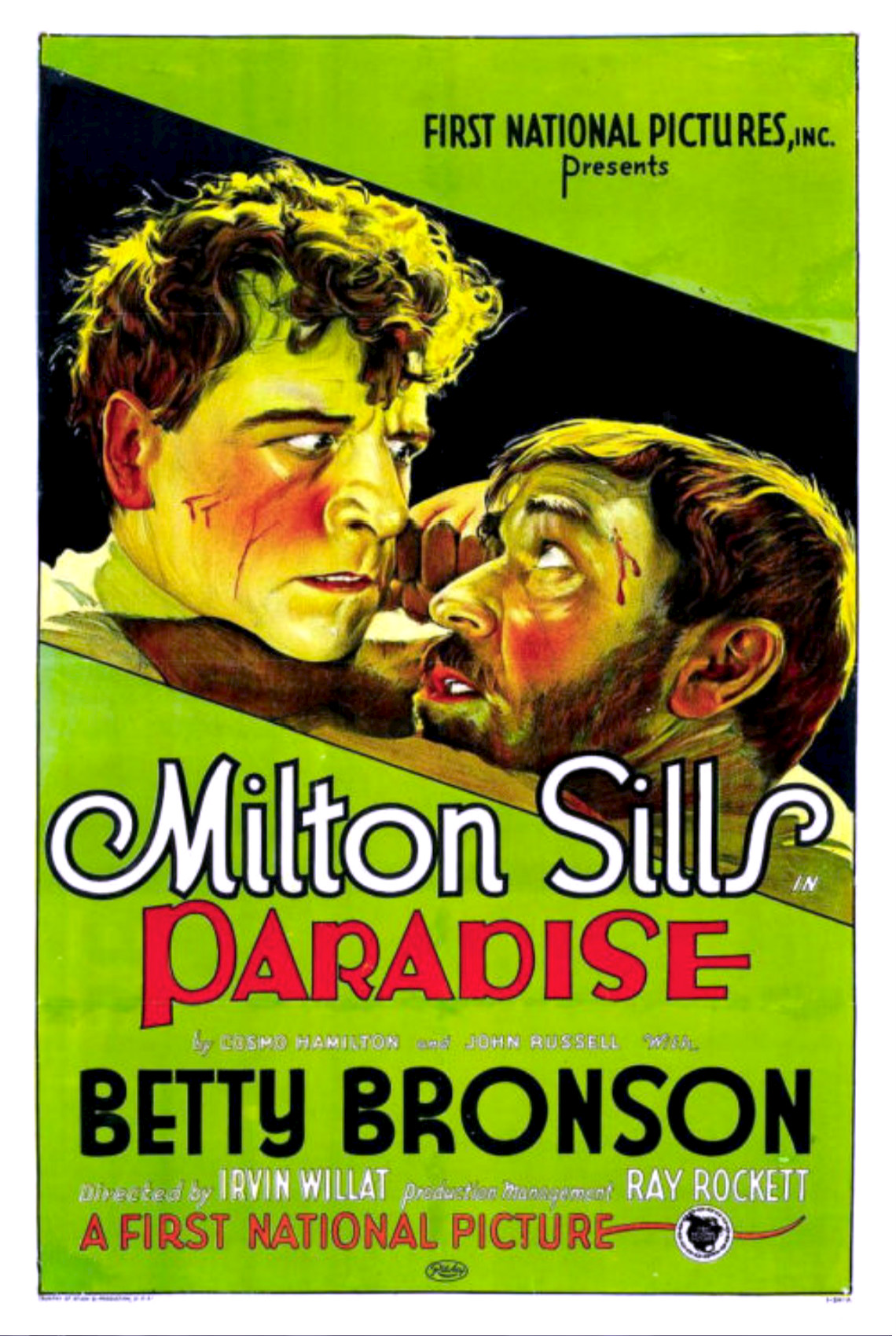
- Film poster with Milton Sills and Noah Beery Sr.
- Directed by: Irvin Willat
- Written by: Paul Schofield (scenario); Frances Agnew (intertitles); Morton Barnard (intertitles)
- Based on: Paradise by Cosmo Hamilton and John Russell
- Produced by: Ray Rocket
- Starring: Milton Sills; Betty Bronson; Noah Beery Sr.
- Cinematography: Charles Van Enger
- Distributed by: First National Pictures
- Release date: September 26, 1926
- Running time: 80 minutes; 8 reels (7,090 feet)
- Country: United States
- Language: Silent (English intertitles)

Paradise is a 1926 American silent romantic drama film directed by Irvin Willat and released by First National Pictures. The film stars Milton Sills, Betty Bronson, and Noah Beery. Based on the popular 1925 novel Paradise by Cosmo Hamilton and John Russell, it was one of Sills' most successful films.

== Plot ==
A stunt pilot, Tony, marries Chrissie and the two are given a tropical island wedding, which is a lot of fun at first. They are considered the King and Queen of their island by the natives. The fun turns into island turmoil at the machinations of island despot Quex.

== Cast ==
- Milton Sills as Tony
- Betty Bronson as Chrissie
- Noah Beery as Quex
- Lloyd Whitlock as Teddy
- Kate Price as Lady George
- Charlie Murray as Lord Lumley
- Claude King as Pollock
- Charles Brook as Perkins
- Edward Cooper as McCoustie

== Preservation ==
With no prints of Paradise located in any film archives, it is a lost film.
