= Thru Different Eyes (1929 film) =

1929 film

- Directed by: John G. Blystone
- Screenplay by: Tom Barry; Milton Herbert Gropper
- Story by: Milton Herbert Gropper; Edna Sherry
- Produced by: John G. Blystone
- Starring: Mary Duncan; Edmund Lowe; Warner Baxter; Natalie Moorhead; Earle Foxe; Donald Gallaher
- Cinematography: Al Brick; Ernest Palmer
- Edited by: Louis R. Loeffler
- Production company: Fox Film Corporation
- Distributed by: Fox Film Corporation
- Release date: April 14, 1929
- Running time: 67 minutes
- Country: United States
- Languages: Sound (All-Talking); English

Thru Different Eyes is a 1929 sound (All-Talking) American pre-Code drama film directed by John G. Blystone and written by Tom Barry and Milton Herbert Gropper. The film stars Mary Duncan, Edmund Lowe, Warner Baxter, Natalie Moorhead, Earle Foxe and Donald Gallaher. The film was released on April 14, 1929, by Fox Film Corporation. A silent version of this film was also made to cater for theaters not wired up for sound. While the silent version survives, the sound version is lost.

== Plot ==
Harvey Manning is tried for murdering his best friend, Jack Winfield, whose body was found in the Manning home. During the trial, attorneys on both sides offer contrasting versions of Manning's character and his wife, Viola, and of the events preceding the murder. Manning is found guilty, but then a young girl comes forward and confesses to killing Winfield.

== Cast ==
The surviving silent version

- Mary Duncan as Viola
- Edmund Lowe as Harvey Manning
- Warner Baxter as Jack Winfield
- Natalie Moorhead as Frances Thornton
- Earle Foxe as Howard Thornton
- Donald Gallaher as Spencer
- Florence Lake as Myrtle
- Sylvia Sidney as Valerie Briand
- Purnell Pratt as Dist. Atty. Marston
- Selmer Jackson as King
- Dolores Johnson as Anna
- Nigel De Brulier as Maynard
- Lola Salvi as Maid
- Stepin Fetchit as Janitor
- DeWitt Jennings as Paducah
- Arthur Stone as Crane
- George Lamont as Traynor
- Natalie Warfield as Aline Craig
- Jack Jordan as Reporter
- Marian Spitzer as Reporter
- Stanley Blystone as Reporter
- Stuart Erwin as Reporter

== Music ==
The film featured a theme song entitled "I'm Saving All My Loving" which was composed by William Kernell and Dave Stamper.

== See also ==
- List of early sound feature films (1926–1929)
