= Soft Living =

1928 film by James Tinling

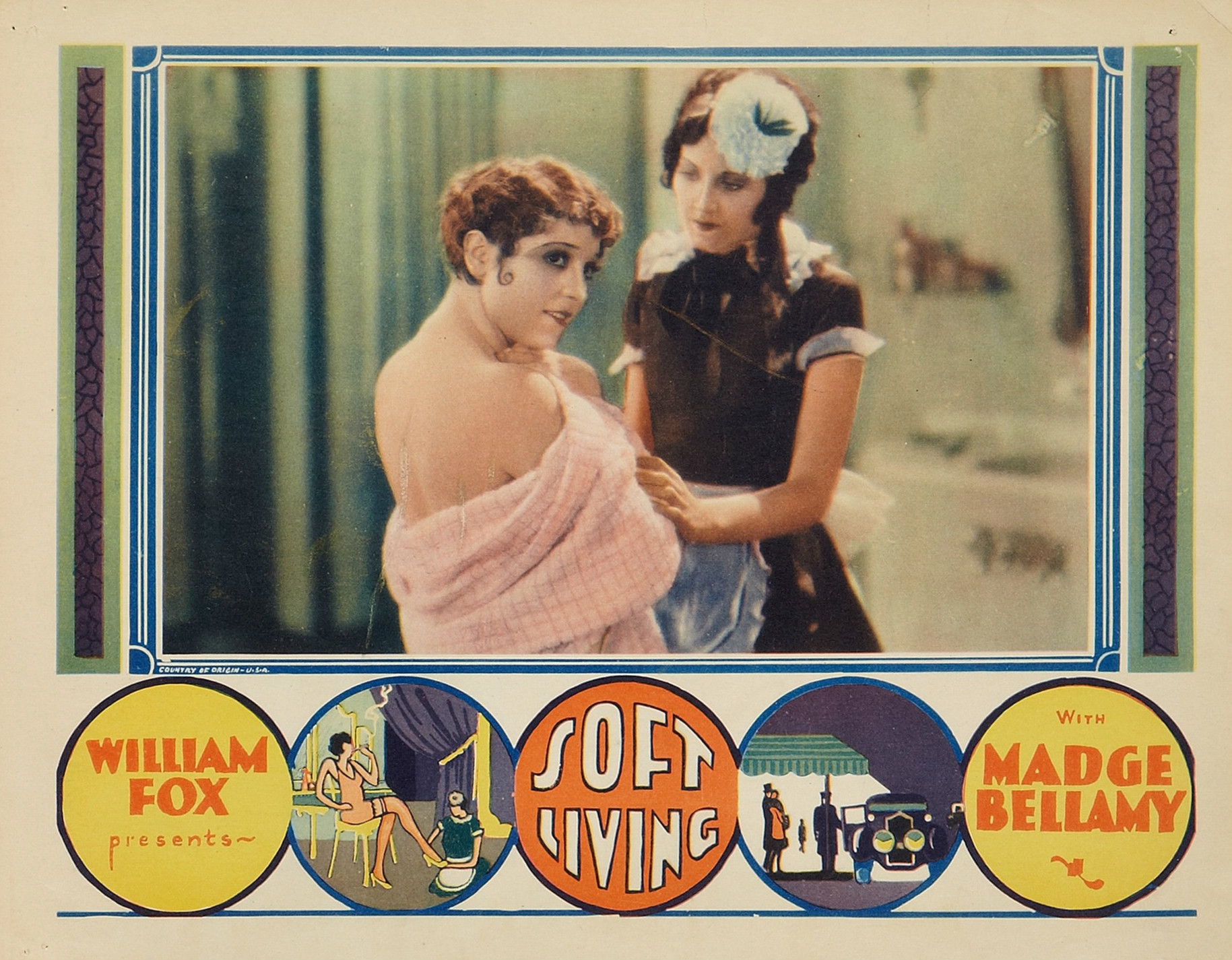
- Directed by: James Tinling
- Written by: Frances Agnew; Malcolm Stuart Boylan; Grace Mack
- Starring: Madge Bellamy; Johnny Mack Brown; Mary Duncan
- Cinematography: Joseph H. August
- Edited by: J. Edwin Robbins
- Production company: Fox Film
- Distributed by: Fox Film
- Release date: February 5, 1928
- Running time: 60 minutes
- Country: United States
- Languages: Silent; English intertitles

Soft Living is a 1928 American silent comedy film directed by James Tinling and starring Madge Bellamy, Johnny Mack Brown and Mary Duncan.

== Cast ==
- Madge Bellamy as Nancy Woods
- Johnny Mack Brown as Stockney Webb
- Mary Duncan as Lorna Estabrook
- Joyce Compton as Billie Wilson
- Thomas Jefferson as Philip Estabrook
- Henry Kolker as Rodney S. Bowen
- Olive Tell as Mrs. Rodney S. Bowen
- Bud Geary as Office Boy
- Tom Dugan as Hired Man
- Dave Wengren as Swede

== Preservation ==
The film survives in a print at the Museum of Modern Art (MOMA).

== Bibliography ==
- Solomon, Aubrey. The Fox Film Corporation, 1915-1935: A History and Filmography. McFarland, 2011.
