= The Flaming Forties =

1924 film

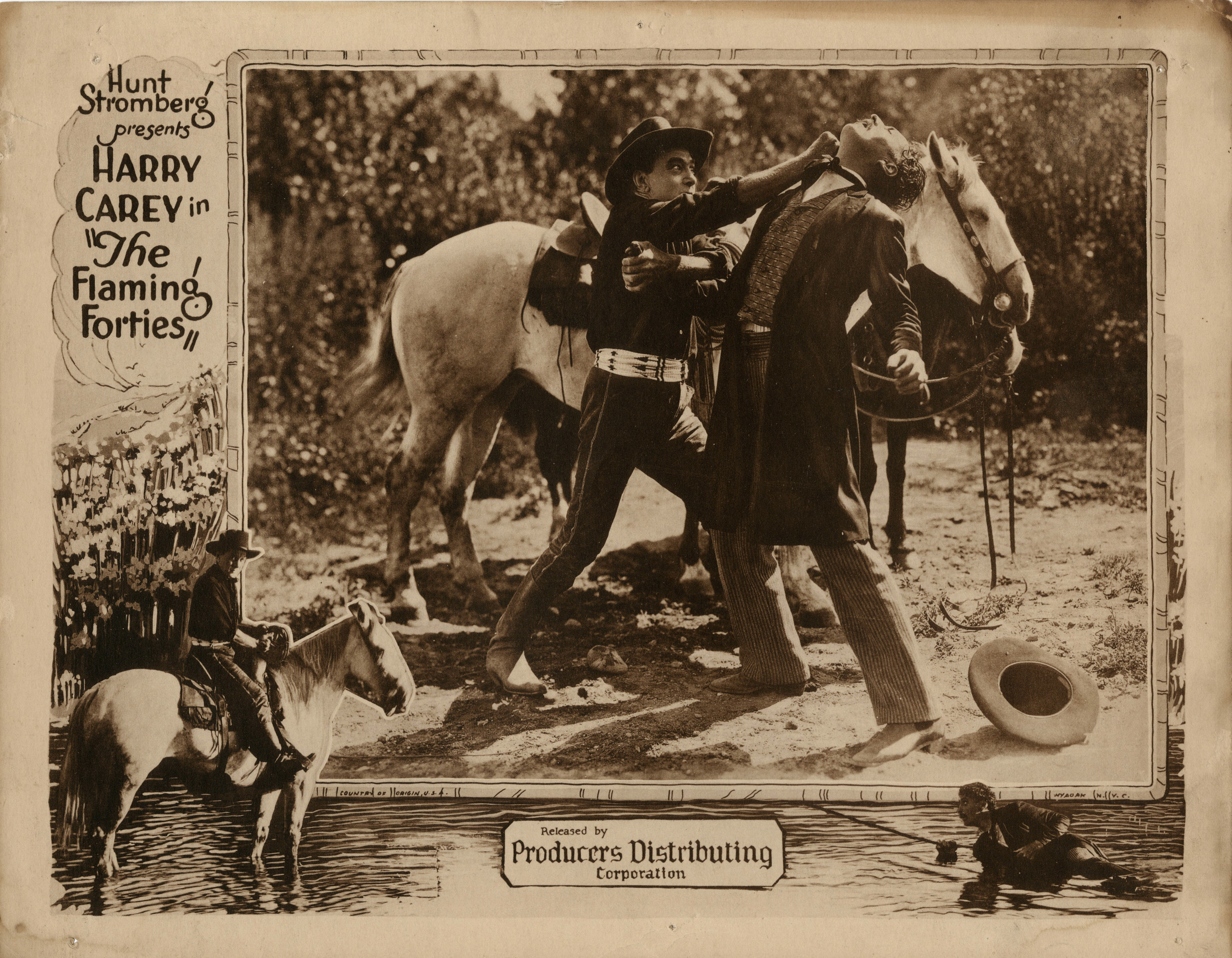
- Lobby card
- Directed by: Tom Forman
- Written by: Elliott J. Clawson; Harvey Gates
- Based on: "Tennessee’s Pardner" by Bret Harte
- Produced by: Hunt Stromberg
- Starring: Harry Carey
- Cinematography: Sol Polito
- Edited by: Robert De Lacey
- Distributed by: Producers Distributing Corporation
- Release date: December 21, 1924
- Running time: 6 reels
- Country: United States
- Languages: Silent; English intertitles

The Flaming Forties is a 1924 American silent Western film, the sixth of seven features which short-lived motion picture company Stellar Productions released in 1924–1925 as Producers Distributing Corporation vehicles for Harry Carey. Carey was primarily known as a star of Westerns and only one of the seven films did not fit into that genre. Assigned as director was 31-year-old Tom Forman, who less than two years later, in November 1926, died from a self-inflicted gunshot wound.

The film was based upon the 1869 Bret Harte story "Tennessee’s Pardner," which has also been filmed as Tennessee's Pardner (1916), The Golden Princess (1925), and Tennessee's Partner (1955).

== Cast ==
- Harry Carey as Bill Jones
- William Norton Bailey as Desparde
- Jacqueline Gadsden as Sally
- James Mason as Charley "Jay Bird Charley"
- Frank Norcross as Colonel Starbottle
- Wilbur Higby as The Sheriff

== Preservation ==
With no prints of The Flaming Forties located in any film archives, it is a lost film.

== See also ==
- Harry Carey filmography
