= Tennessee's Partner =

1955 film by Allan Dwan

- Theatrical release poster
- Directed by: Allan Dwan
- Screenplay by: Graham Baker; D.D. Beauchamp; Milton Krims; Teddi Sherman; Uncredited: Allan Dwan
- Based on: "Tennessee’s Pardner" by Bret Harte
- Produced by: Benedict Bogeaus
- Starring: John Payne; Ronald Reagan; Rhonda Fleming; Coleen Gray
- Cinematography: John Alton
- Edited by: James Leicester
- Music by: Louis Forbes; Uncredited: Howard Jackson; William Lava
- Production company: Filmcrest Productions
- Distributed by: RKO Radio Pictures
- Release date: September 21, 1955
- Running time: 86 minutes
- Country: United States
- Language: English
- Box office: $1.1 million (US)

Tennessee's Partner is a 1955 American Western film, directed by Allan Dwan, written by: Graham Baker, D.D. Beauchamp, Milton Krims and Teddi Sherman, with uncredited rewrites by Dwan, and starring: John Payne, Ronald Reagan, Rhonda Fleming and Coleen Gray.

The film was released by RKO Radio Pictures, which was then owned by industrialist Howard Hughes. While the film is based upon one of Bret Harte's most popular short stories, "Tennessee’s Pardner", it departs significantly from the original storyline. The 1869 Harte story has also been filmed as Tennessee's Pardner (1916), The Flaming Forties (1924) and The Golden Princess (1925).

== Plot ==
Tennessee is a gambler and partners with Duchesse Elizabeth Farnham. Tennessee has few friends and makes enemies by winning most of the time. One night Tennessee is ambushed by Clifford, who lost a lot of money to Tennessee. A stranger who calls himself Cowpoke sees this and saves Tennessee. Cowpoke is in love with Goldie, who arrives on a riverboat. Tennessee recognizes Goldie from his past. Cowpoke gives Goldie $5,000 in gold. Tennessee is torn between telling Cowpoke about her past or keeping quiet.

Reynolds, also a gambler, arrives on the same boat as Goldie, planning to kill Tennessee. He gambles with Tennessee. A crowd assembles to watch them play. Reynolds accuses Tennessee of cheating. Reynolds draws a gun and Tennessee shoots him, in self defence.

Tennessee visits Goldie and kisses her. He tries to persuade her to go to San Francisco with him, showing her the $50,000 he made at the card table. She agrees. He tells her he’ll meet her at the riverboat. When Cowpoke arrives to meet Goldie, Duchesse tells him she left with her luggage and Tennessee. The town is aware and Cowpoke is humiliated and feels betrayed. Tennessee escorts her onto the boat, then leaves her there.

Cowpoke plans to follow Tennessee and kill him. He goes to work his claim to get money to travel after Tennessee. Cowpoke meets up with Grubstake, who has made his strike. Grubstake goes to Duchesse, who tells her girls to give him a bath. Tennessee returns to Duchesse and explains that he sent Goldie away to protect Cowpoke. He has Cowpoke’s $5,000.

Tennessee takes Grubstake away from the crowd and puts him to bed. Since Tennessee staked him, he’s entitled to a share of the strike. He hides Grubstake’s map, and goes to see Cowpoke. He yells Cowpoke the truth about Goldie. Cowpoke hits Tennessee but he refuses to hit him. He gives Cowpoke his $5,000 and explains he sent her away to protect him.

Grubstakes is killed and Tennessee is suspected. The sheriff goes looking for Tennessee with a posse. Duchesse warns Tennessee to leave. Cowpoke stays behind to hold off the posse, which is really the gold hungry mines. Cowpoke holds them off with a gun, giving Tennessee a chance to explain. The sheriff takes Tennessee back to his place, but the map has been stolen. Cowpoke provides Tennessee with an alibi but the sheriff is skeptical and arrests Tennessee. Cowpoke, who drew the map, knows where the gold is. He and Tennessee disarm the deputy and escape. They go to Duchesse to ensure she and the girls are OK, then go to the mine. They find a horse there and think that whoever is there killed Grubstake. It’s Turner and a gunfight ensues. The sheriff and deputy arrive. Turner surrenders, then pulls another gun, aiming for Tennessee. Cowpoke blocks the bullet, and dies. Tennessee chases after Turner. The sheriff stops Tennessee from killing him. Tennessee looks at Cowpoke and says “I never even knew his name”.

Tennessee marries Duchesse and they leave on the riverboat.

== Cast ==
- John Payne as Tennessee
- Ronald Reagan as Cowpoke
- Rhonda Fleming as Elizabeth "Duchess" Farnham
- Coleen Gray as Goldie Slater
- Tony Caruso as Turner
- Morris Ankrum as Judge Parker
- Leo Gordon as the Sheriff
- Chubby Johnson as Grubstake McNiven
- Joe Deviln as Prendergast
- Myron Healey as Reynolds
- John Mansfield as Clifford
- Angie Dickinson (uncredited) as Abby Dean

== Legacy ==
This film inspired one of the greatest hits of The Four Seasons. As the character based on Bob Gaudio explains in the musical Jersey Boys: "I'm watching the million dollar movie. Some cheesy John Payne western. He hauls off and smacks Rhonda Fleming across the mouth and says: 'What do you think of that?'. She looks up at him defiant, proud, eyes glistening – and she says: 'Big girls don't cry'."
