= The Golden Princess =

1925 film

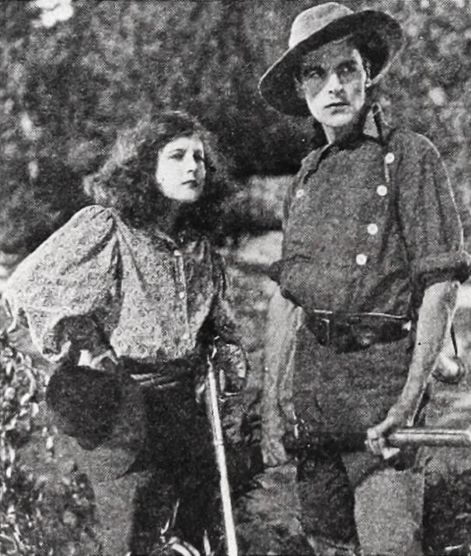
- Still with Betty Bronson and Neil Hamilton
- Directed by: Clarence G. Badger
- Written by: Frances Agnew
- Based on: "Tennessee’s Pardner" by Bret Harte
- Produced by: Jesse L. Lasky; Adolph Zukor
- Starring: Betty Bronson; Neil Hamilton; Phyllis Haver; Joseph J. Dowling; Edgar Kennedy; George Irving; Norma Wills
- Cinematography: H. Kinley Martin
- Production company: Famous Players–Lasky Corporation
- Distributed by: Paramount Pictures
- Release date: October 5, 1925
- Running time: 90 minutes
- Country: United States
- Language: Silent (English intertitles)

The Golden Princess is a 1925 American silent Western film directed by Clarence G. Badger and written by Frances Agnew based upon an 1869 story by Bret Harte. The film stars Betty Bronson, Neil Hamilton, Phyllis Haver, Joseph J. Dowling, Edgar Kennedy, George Irving, and Norma Wills. The film was released on October 5, 1925, by Paramount Pictures.

The 1869 Bret Harte story "Tennessee’s Pardner" has also been filmed as Tennessee's Pardner (1916), The Flaming Forties (1924), and Tennessee's Partner (1955).

== Plot ==
As described in a film magazine reviews, Bill Kent with his wife Kate and daughter Betty goes prospecting to California. Kate meets the rake Tom Romaine and elopes with him, taking Betty along. Kent and a boy, Tennessee Hunter, start in pursuit. Romaine kills Kent and runs off with the woman, leaving Betty with Hunter. Hunter takes the child to an old padre and goes away. The padre dies suddenly when Betty is a young woman and she goes to Poverty Gulch to find her father. No one knows her father. An old Indian woman takes her to Hunter, who when he learns who she is, takes her into his cabin and gives her in charge to another Indian woman. Hunter, his pal, and Betty, known now as the Princess, find gold and stake claims, opening the Golden Princess Mines. Romaine and Kate appear and discover the Princess. Romaine demands that Kate tell the girl he is her father so that he can share her wealth. Hunter recognizes him as the murderer and a fight at the mines ensues in which Hunter and Betty are imprisoned. Kate kills Romaine and in a second mine accident she is fatally wounded. She asks Hunter to care for Betty and never tell the girl who her mother was. Hunter's partner finds their cabin turned into a love nest and vacates in favor of the lovers.

== Cast ==
- Betty Bronson as Betty Kent
- Neil Hamilton as Tennessee Hunter
- Phyllis Haver as Kate Kent
- Joseph J. Dowling as Padre
- Edgar Kennedy as Gewilliker Hay
- George Irving as Bill Ket
- Norma Wills as Indian Squaw
- Mary Schoene as Betty, as a child
- Don Marion as Tennessee Hunter
- Rockliffe Fellowes as Tom Romaine

== Censorship ==
Before The Golden Princess could be exhibited in Kansas, the Kansas Board of Review required the removal of the hold up scene.

== Preservation ==
With no prints of The Golden Princess located in any film archives, it is a lost film.
