= Summer Bachelors =

1926 film by Allan Dwan

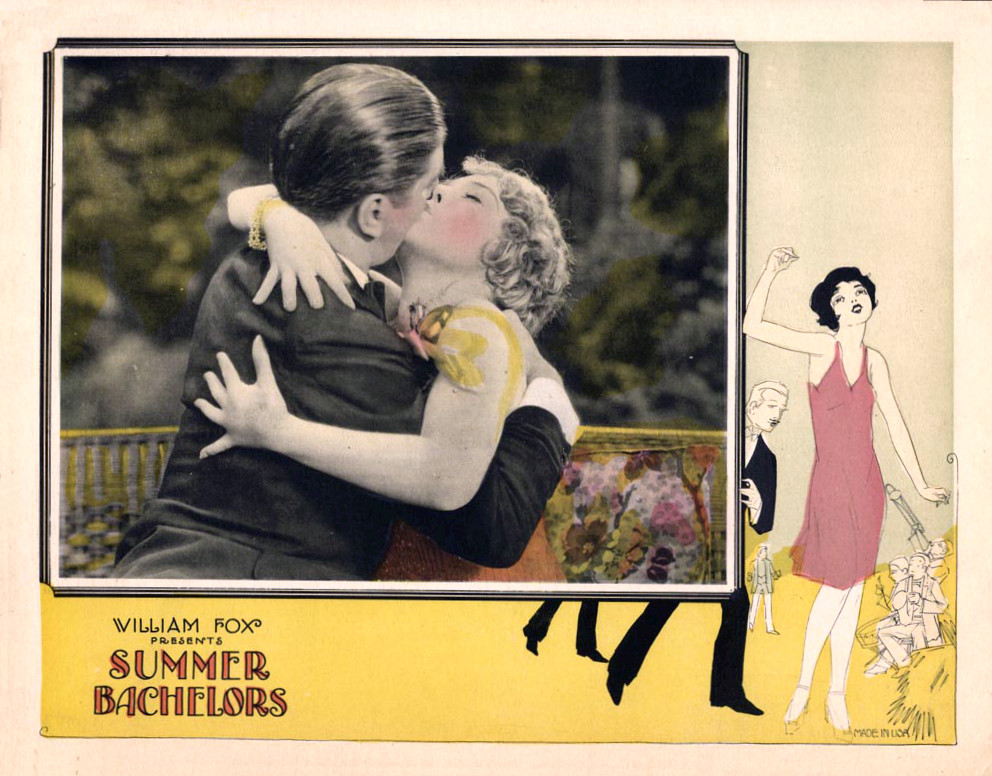
- Lobby card
- Directed by: Allan Dwan
- Written by: James Shelley Hamilton (scenario)
- Based on: Summer Widowers by Warner Fabian
- Produced by: William Fox
- Starring: Madge Bellamy; Matt Moore; Allan Forrest; Hale Hamilton
- Cinematography: Joseph Ruttenberg
- Edited by: Frances Agnew
- Distributed by: Fox Film Corporation
- Release date: December 18, 1926
- Running time: 70 minutes
- Country: United States
- Language: Silent (English intertitles)

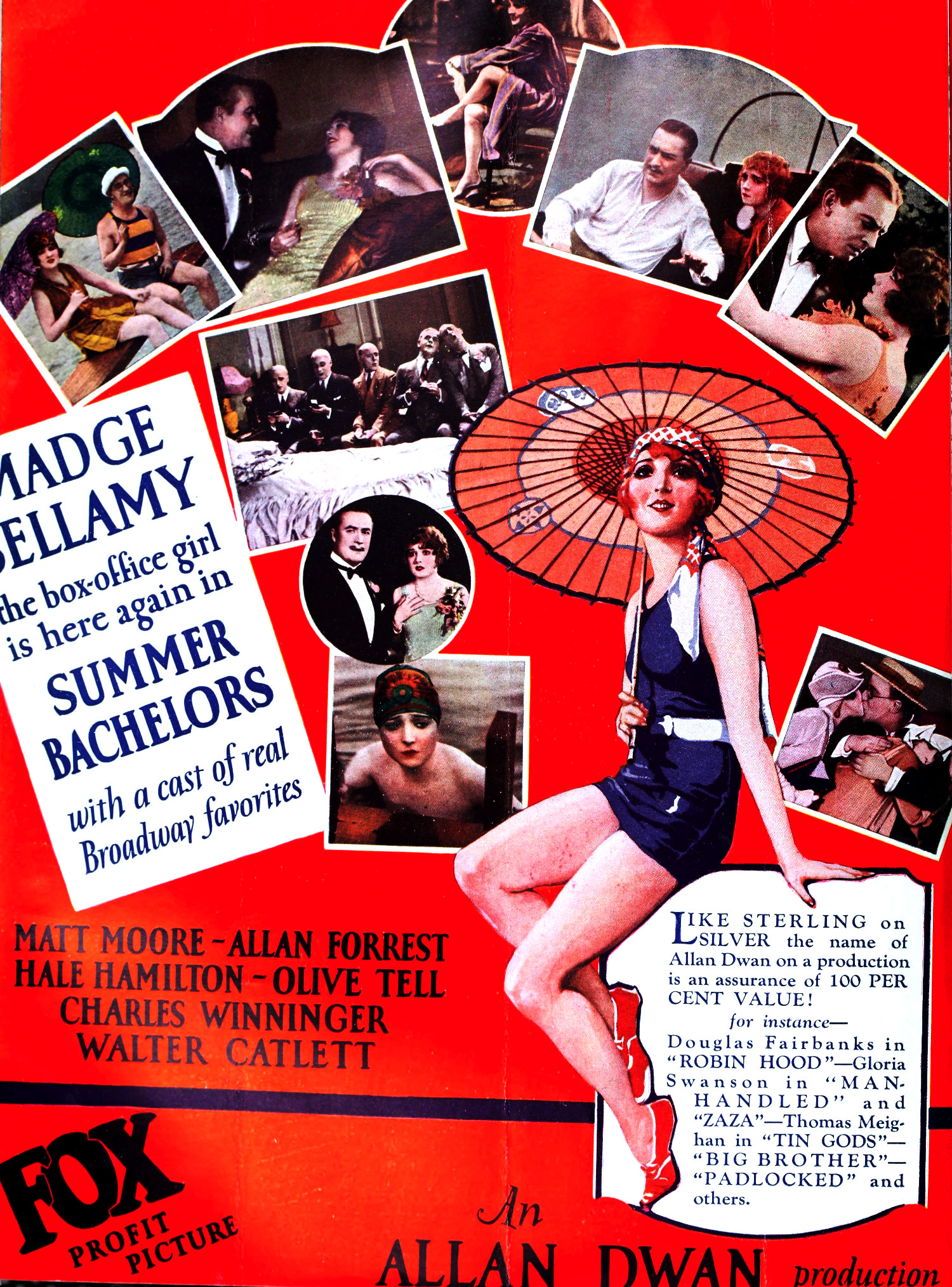
Trade ad for the film

Summer Bachelors is a 1926 American silent romantic comedy film produced and directed by Allan Dwan. The film is based on the 1926 novel Summer Widowers by Warner Fabian and stars Madge Bellamy, Matt Moore, Allan Forrest, and Hale Hamilton.

== Plot ==
After observing other peoples' bad romantic experiences, Derry Thomas no longer has any faith in men. Not believing in marriage, she organizes a club in which, in the summertime, married men can meet single women. A meeting of the club is also attended by Tony Landor, who, unlike the other male attendants, is still a bachelor. Derry falls in love with him, but hesitates to accept it. Put under hypnosis, she ends up confessing that she loves him. A judge, also a member of the club, makes himself available to the couple to perform a civil marriage.

== Cast ==
- Madge Bellamy as Derry Thomas
- Allan Forrest as Tony Landor
- Matt Moore as Walter Blakely
- Hale Hamilton as Beverly Greenway
- Leila Hyams as Willowdean French
- Charles Winninger as Preston Smith
- John Holland as Martin Cole
- Olive Tell as Mrs. Preston Smith
- Walter Catlett as Bachelor #1
- James F. Cullen as Bachelor #2
- Cosmo Kyrle Bellew as Bachelor #3
- Charles Esdale as Bachelor #4
- Barbara Barondess (uncredited)

== Production ==
Interiors shot were filmed at Fox's New York studio, while exteriors were shot on location in Lake Placid, New York.

== Reception ==
The film was considered glamorous by an Indiana critic: "Fifth Avenue, Riverside Drive, Long Island Sound, country house parties, dances on fashionable hotel roofs and in Westchester roadhouses - these are a few of the setting for 'Summer Bachelors.'"

Others were scandalized. American films in 1927 were subject to censorship under local and state law. The operator of the Royal Theatre in Sioux City, Iowa, was arrested and fined $25 for showing Summer Bachelors after a citizen filed a complaint for showing an "improper motion picture." A witness from the local woman's club testified in support of the complaint that the film had objectionable scenes, the first where a woman went for a swim apparently without a bathing suit, and in a hay mowing scene where a young couple were caught in a rainstorm, sought shelter for the night, and went to sleep unchaperoned. In another scene noted in testimony, a married man with a young woman on a yacht forcibly kissed her. After filing an appeal and a $200 bond, the theater owner cut two scenes from the film.

== Preservation ==
A copy of Summer Bachelors is preserved at a film archive in Prague.
