= Katharine Fullerton Gerould =

American novelist

Katharine Elizabeth Fullerton Gerould (February 6, 1879 – July 27, 1944) was an American writer and essayist.

== Biography ==
Katharine Elizabeth Fullerton was born in Brockton, Massachusetts, and became the adopted daughter of Reverend Bradford Morton Fullerton and Julia Maria (née Ball). After a private education in Miss Folsom's School and in France, she entered Radcliffe College in 1896. There, she earned an A.B. in 1900 then an A.M. in 1901. Her 1900 story "The Poppies in the Wheat" was selected by The Century Magazine as the best short story by an undergraduate. She was appointed to Bryn Mawr College in 1901, where she taught English composition for a decade. She married Gordon Hall Gerould in 1910, and the couple had two children.

She became noted as a prominent writer of the short story and one of the nation's foremost essayists. Between 1902 and 1939, she was a published author with regular works appearing in Century, The Atlantic Monthly, Harper's and Scribner's. Between 1911 and 1929, she published nearly fifty short stories, with half appearing during the years 1913–1917. Many of her stories appeared in the collections Vain Oblations (1914), The Great Tradition (1915), and Valiant Dust (1922). Her stories also appeared in the annual The Best Short Stories during the years 1917, 1920–1922, and 1925. Less successful were her novels, A Change of Air (1917), Lost Valley (1922), Conquistador (1923), and The Light That Never Was (1931). Her collected essays were published as Modes and Morals (1920) and Ringside Seats (1937).

She also published two travel volumes: Hawaii: Scenes and Impressions (1916) and The Aristocratic West (1925). In 1923, she was chosen to deliver the Isaac H. Bromley Lectures at Yale University on the topic of "The Modern Short Story and the Modern Novel". Her novel Conquistador was adapted into two films, The Yankee Señor in 1926 and Romance of the Rio Grande in 1929.

After being ill for more than two years, she died of lung cancer in Princeton, New Jersey. Her body was cremated.

== Selected publications ==
- "The Remarkable Rightness of Rudyard Kipling," The Atlantic Monthly, Vol. 123, 1919.
- "What Constitutes an Educated Person Today?," The Atlantic Monthly, Vol. 127, 1921.
- "Movies," The Atlantic Monthly, Vol. 128, 1921.
- "On Being a Sport," The Atlantic Monthly, Vol. 128, 1921.
- "The Æsthetics of Conservatism," The Atlantic Monthly, Vol. 130, 1922.
- "Men, Women, and the Byron-Complex," The Atlantic Monthly, Vol. 130, 1922.
