= Second Garrotte =

Historical place in Tuolumne County, United States

Second Garrote, California
- Location within California Location within the United States
- 37.82493°N 120.195747°W
- Location: 20450 Old State Route 120, Groveland, California.

History
- Built: 1849, 177 years ago

Site notes
- Architectural style: mining town

California Historical Landmark
- Designated: May 9, 1950
- Reference no.: 460

Second Garrotte (also spelled Garrote) is a ghost town located near Groveland in Tuolumne County, California, United States, originally settled during the California Gold Rush. The site of Second Garrote is a California Historical Landmark, No. 460 listed on May 9, 1950. It lies at an elevation of 2,894 feet (882 meters) in Second Garrotte Basin.

The town was named after a nearby hanging tree, where according to local lore as many as thirty men were said to have been hanged. Certain contemporary accounts from miners and settlers in the area suggest only two men were hung at Second Garrotte, a pair of thieves caught stealing gold dust from a sluice box. John Chaffee and Jason Chamberlain, early settlers at Second Garrotte who owned the property on which the hanging tree stood, denied any hangings took place.

The nearby town of Groveland was originally known as First Garrotte, named after an earlier hanging at that town.

The historical location of Second Garrote is at 20450 Old State Route 120, 2.4 miles southeast of Groveland. The marker was placed there by the California Centennials Commission, working with Charles G. Hall Post No. 3668 V.F.W. on September 15, 1950. California Historical Landmark number 460 reads:

NO. 460 SECOND GARROTE - A sizable settlement was established at this rich placer location in 1849 by miners spreading east from Big Oak Flat and Groveland. The famous hangman's tree, part of which still stands (1950), is reported to have been instrumental in the death of a number of lawbreakers during the heyday of this locality.

== See also ==
- California Historical Landmarks in Tuolumne County
- List of ghost towns in California
