= Gordon Hall Gerould =

American novelist

Gordon Hall Gerould (1877 – April 10, 1953) was an American philologist and folklorist of the United States.

== Biography ==
Born in Goffstown, New Hampshire, he joined the faculty of Bryn Mawr College and was a professor of English at Princeton University. Prior to being a professor of English he graduated from Dartmouth College then went back to school and graduated from Oxford with a Bachelors. In 1910 he married fellow writer Katharine Elizabeth Fullerton Gerould. He served in the U.S. Army, holding the rank of captain in 1918. He died on 10 April 1953 in Asheville, North Carolina.

== Selected bibliography ==
- The North England Homily Collection (1902)
- Sir Guy of Warwick (1905)
- Selected Essays of Fielding (1905)
- The Grateful Dead: The History of a Folk Story (1908)
- Saints' Legends (1916)
- Peter Sanders, Retired (1920)
- The Ballad of Tradition (1932)
