= The Man Who Came Back (1931 film) =

1931 film directed by Raoul Walsh

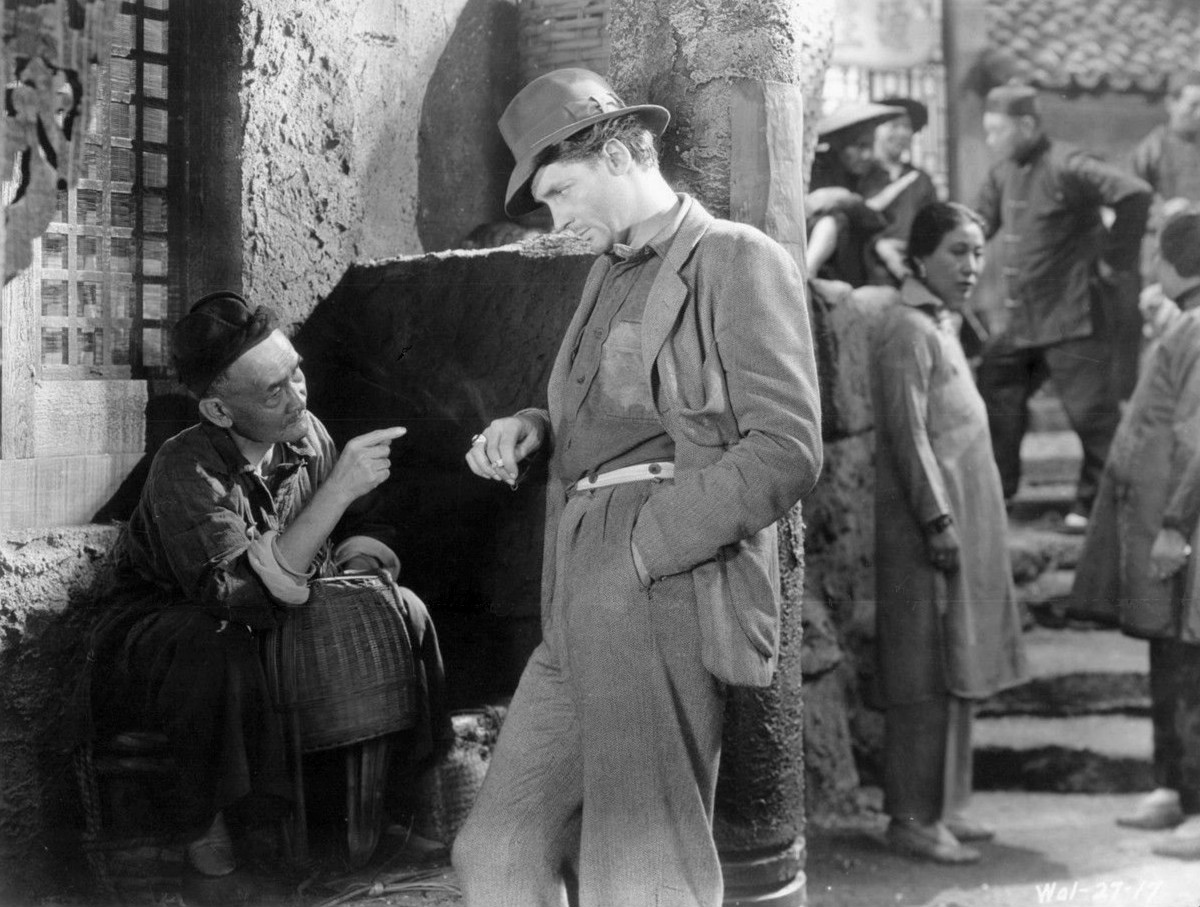
- Charles Farrell in a scene from the film.
- Directed by: Raoul Walsh
- Written by: Jules Eckert Goodman (play); Edwin J. Burke
- Based on: The Man Who Came Back (1912) by John Fleming Wilson
- Produced by: Raoul Walsh
- Starring: Janet Gaynor; Charles Farrell
- Cinematography: Arthur Edeson
- Distributed by: Fox Film Corporation
- Release date: January 11, 1931
- Running time: 74 minutes
- Country: United States
- Language: English
- Box office: $1.4 million

The Man Who Came Back is a 1931 American Pre-Code romantic drama film directed by Raoul Walsh, starring Janet Gaynor and Charles Farrell. The movie was adapted to screen by Edwin J. Burke from the play by Jules Eckert Goodman.

A Fox property for many years, it had been filmed before in the silent era in 1924 with George O'Brien and Dorothy Mackaill in the leads. A Spanish-language version called Road of Hell was made in the same year.

Gaynor and Farrell made almost a dozen films together, including Frank Borzage's classics Seventh Heaven (1927), Street Angel (1928), and Lucky Star (1929); Gaynor won the first Academy Award for Best Actress for the first two and F. W. Murnau's Sunrise: A Song of Two Humans (1927).

== Cast ==
- Janet Gaynor as Angie Randolph
- Charles Farrell as Stephen Randolph
- Kenneth MacKenna as Captain Trevelyan
- William Holden as Thomas Randolph
- Mary Forbes as Mrs. Gaynes
- Ullrich Haupt as Charles Reisling
- William Worthington as Captain Gallon
- Peter Gawthorne as Griggs
- Leslie Fenton as Baron le Duc
