= The First Year (1932 film) =

1932 film

- Swedish poster
- Directed by: William K. Howard
- Written by: Frank Craven (play); Lynn Starling
- Starring: Janet Gaynor; Charles Farrell
- Cinematography: Hal Mohr
- Edited by: Jack Murray
- Distributed by: Fox Film Corporation
- Release date: July 31, 1932
- Running time: 80 min.
- Country: United States
- Language: English

The First Year is a 1932 American pre-Code film based on a 1920 play of the same name that originally ran on Broadway at the Little Theatre. The play was written by Frank Craven and produced by John Golden. It closed in 1922 after 760 performances.

In 1932, a film adapted from the Craven play was written by Lynn Starling. The film starred Janet Gaynor and Charles Farrell, and was directed by William K. Howard.

Gaynor and Farrell made almost a dozen films together, including Frank Borzage's classics Seventh Heaven (1927), Street Angel (1928), and Lucky Star (1929); Gaynor won the first Academy Award for Best Actress for the first two and F. W. Murnau's Sunrise: A Song of Two Humans (1927).

== Cast ==
- Janet Gaynor as Grace Livingston
- Charles Farrell as Tommy Tucker
- Minna Gombell as Mrs. Barstow
- Dudley Digges as Dr. Anderson
- George Meeker as Dick Loring
- Robert McWade as Fred Livingston
