= The River (1929 film) =

1928 film

- Directed by: Frank Borzage
- Written by: John Hunter Booth; Tristram Tupper (novel); Dwight Cummins; Philip Klein
- Produced by: William Fox
- Starring: Charles Farrell; Mary Duncan
- Cinematography: Ernest Palmer
- Edited by: Barney Wolf
- Music by: Maurice Baron
- Distributed by: Fox Film Corporation
- Release date: December 22, 1928
- Running time: 84 minutes
- Country: United States
- Languages: Sound (Part-Talkie); English Intertitles

Partial Restoration of The River

The River is a 1928 sound part-talkie drama film directed by Frank Borzage, and starring Charles Farrell and Mary Duncan. In addition to sequences with audible dialogue or talking sequences, the film features a synchronized musical score and sound effects along with English intertitles. The soundtrack was recorded using the Movietone sound-on-film system. A reconstructed version with the about 55 minutes of surviving film, using still images and explanatory titlecards to bridge the missing scenes, was produced by the Munich Filmmuseum, in collaboration with the cinémathèques of Switzerland and Luxembourg. This version was screened in 2006 by the American Museum of the Moving Image in New York City. Borzage also directed Farrell, opposite Janet Gaynor, in Seventh Heaven (1927), Street Angel (1928), and Lucky Star (1929) during this period.

== Plot ==
Allen John Pender is an innocent young man who wishes to go to the sea on the boat he has built. He falls in love with jaded Rosalee, the former mistress of a man now in jail for murder.

== Cast ==
- Charles Farrell as Allen John Spender
- Mary Duncan as Rosalee
- Ivan Linow as Sam Thompson
- Margaret Mann as Widow Thompson
- Alfred Sabato as Marsdon
- Bert Woodruff as The Miller

== Music ==
The film features a theme song entitled "I Found Happiness (When I Found You)" with music by Erno Rapee and lyrics by Lew Pollack.

== Reception ==
Revue du Cinema critic Jean George Auriol described The River as "undoubtedly the most lyrical love film ever made."

== See also ==
- List of early sound feature films (1926–1929)
- List of incomplete or partially lost films
