= Merely Mary Ann =

American 1931 film

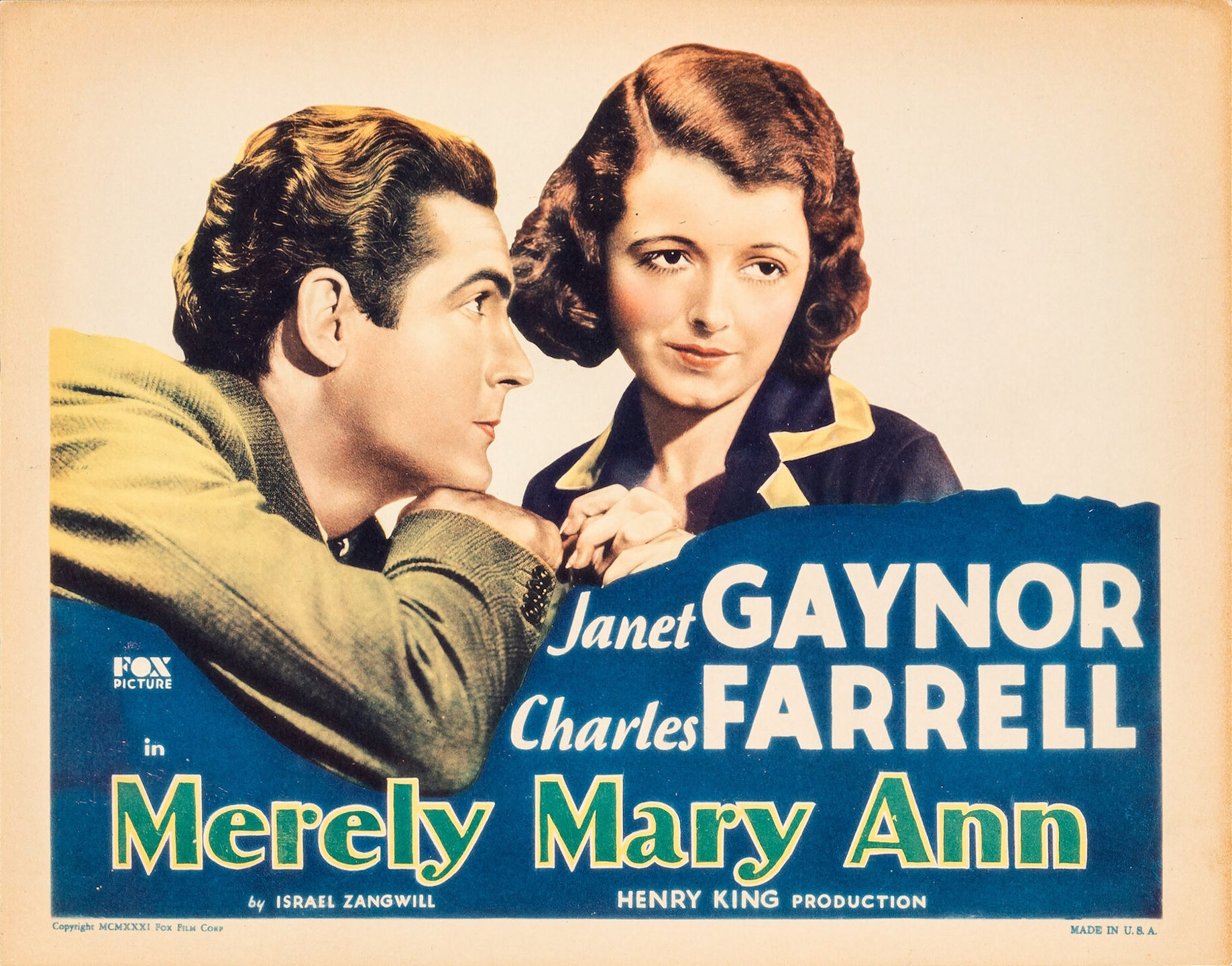
- Lobby card
- Directed by: Henry King
- Written by: Jules Furthman
- Based on: Merely Mary Ann (1903) by Israel Zangwill
- Starring: Janet Gaynor; Charles Farrell; Beryl Mercer
- Cinematography: Arthur E. Arling; John F. Seitz
- Edited by: Frank E. Hull
- Music by: Richard Fall
- Distributed by: Fox Film Corporation
- Release date: September 6, 1931
- Running time: 74 minutes
- Country: United States
- Language: English
- Box office: $1.3 million

Merely Mary Ann a 1931 American pre-Code romantic comedy drama film starring Janet Gaynor and Charles Farrell. Gaynor and Farrell made almost a dozen films together, including Frank Borzage's classics 7th Heaven (1927), Street Angel (1928), and Lucky Star (1929); Gaynor won the first Academy Award for Best Actress for the first two and F. W. Murnau's Sunrise: A Song of Two Humans. The film, involving an orphan (Gaynor) and a flat-broke composer (Farrell), was written by Jules Furthman based upon Israel Zangwill's play of the same name and directed by Henry King.

== Plot ==
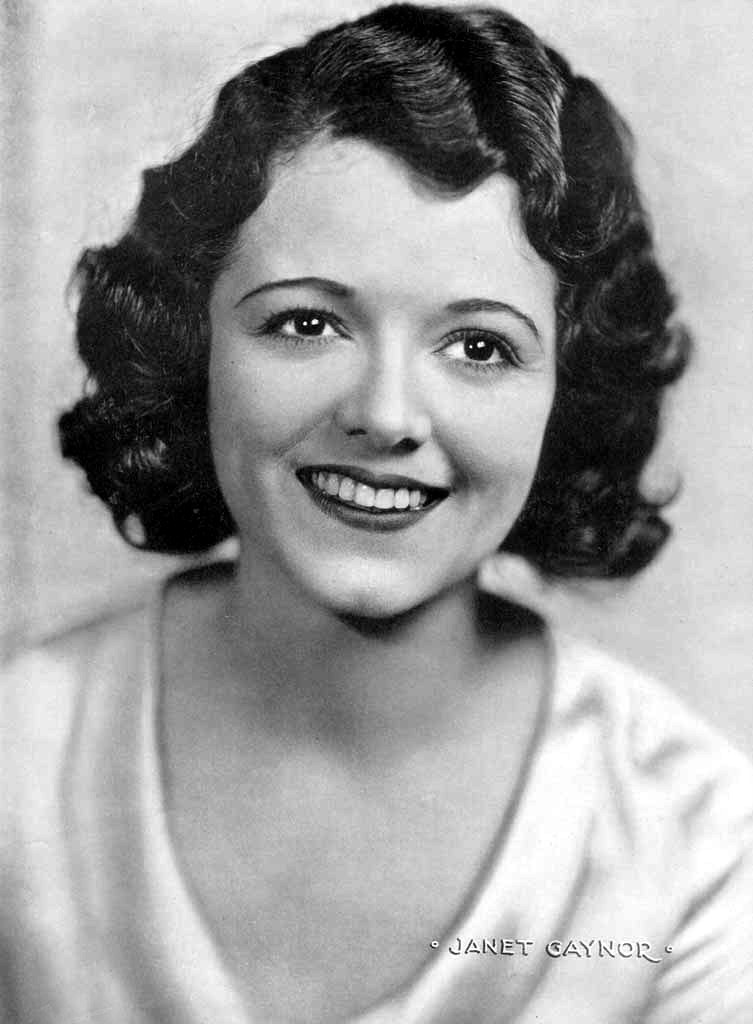
Janet Gaynor

Orphan drudge Mary Ann finds love and hope in the arms of a promising but poor composer, John Lonsdale.

== Cast ==
- Janet Gaynor as Mary Ann
- Charles Farrell as John Lonsdale
- Beryl Mercer as Mrs. Leadbatter
- J. M. Kerrigan as First Drayman
- Tom Whiteley as Second Drayman
- Lorna Balfour as Lorna Leadbatter
- Arnold Lucy as Vicar Smedge
- G. P. Huntley as Peter Brooke
- Harry Rosenthal
