= High Society Blues =

1930 film

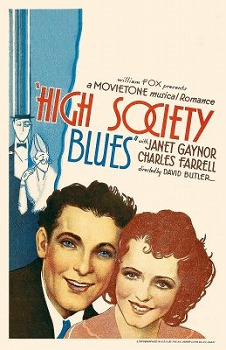
- original theatrical poster
- Directed by: David Butler
- Written by: Howard J. Green from the story by Dana Burnett
- Produced by: William Fox
- Starring: Janet Gaynor; Charles Farrell
- Cinematography: Charles Van Enger
- Edited by: Irene Morra
- Music by: R. H. Bassett; Samuel Kaylin
- Distributed by: Fox Film Corporation
- Release date: March 23, 1930
- Running time: 102 minutes
- Country: United States
- Language: English

High Society Blues is a 1930 American pre-Code romantic musical film starring Janet Gaynor and Charles Farrell. The movie was written by Howard J. Green from the story by Dana Burnett, and directed by David Butler.

Gaynor and Farrell made almost a dozen films together, including Frank Borzage's classics Seventh Heaven (1927), Street Angel (1928), and Lucky Star (1929); Gaynor won the first Academy Award for Best Actress for the first two and F. W. Murnau's Sunrise: A Song of Two Humans (1927).

== Plot ==
A new country family comes to live among established wealthy neighbors.

High Society Blues
The surviving soundtrack/audio of the film from Movietone sound discs.

== Cast ==
- Janet Gaynor as Eleanor Divine
- Charles Farrell as Eddie Granger
- William Collier Sr. as Horace Divine
- Hedda Hopper as Mrs. Divine
- Joyce Compton as Pearl Granger
- Lucien Littlefield as Eli Granger
- Louise Fazenda as Mrs. Granger
- Brandon Hurst as Jowles

== Songs ==
The film two theme songs, "I'm in the Market For You" and "Just Like in a Story Book", both by Joseph McCarthy (lyrics) and James F. Hanley (music).
