= Delicious (1931 film) =

1931 film

- original film poster
- Directed by: David Butler
- Written by: Guy Bolton; Sonya Levien
- Starring: Janet Gaynor; Charles Farrell; Virginia Cherrill
- Cinematography: Ernest Palmer
- Edited by: Irene Morra
- Music by: Score: George Gershwin; Songs: George Gershwin (music); Ira Gershwin (lyrics)
- Distributed by: Fox Film Corporation
- Release date: December 27, 1931 (U.S.)
- Running time: 106 minutes
- Country: United States
- Language: English

Delicious (1931) is an American pre-Code Gershwin musical romantic comedy film starring Janet Gaynor and Charles Farrell, directed by David Butler, written by Guy Bolton and Sonya Levien, with color sequences in Multicolor (now lost).

== Cast ==
- Janet Gaynor as Heather Gordon
- Charles Farrell as Larry Beaumont
- El Brendel as Chris Jansen
- Raul Roulien as Sascha
- Lawrence O'Sullivan as Detective O'Flynn
- Manya Roberti as Olga
- Olive Tell as Mrs. Van Bergh
- Virginia Cherrill as Diana Van Bergh
- Mischa Auer as Mischa
- Marvine Maazel as Toscha

== Production background ==
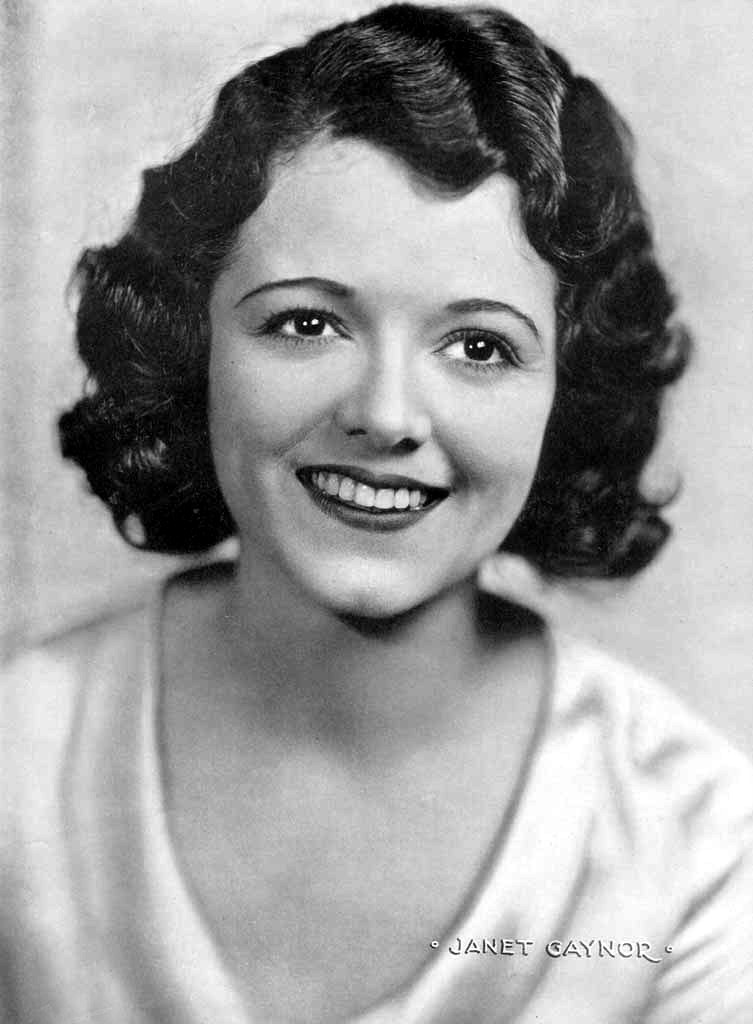
Janet Gaynor

The film features songs by George and Ira Gershwin, who had worked together with the screenplay's coauthor Guy Bolton on a half a dozen musicals, as recently as Girl Crazy the previous year. (Note: Bolton and John McGowan wrote the book of Girl Crazy. The other Gershwin-Bolton collaborations are Primrose, Lady, Be Good!, Tip-Toes, Oh, Kay!, and Rosalie.) Their contributions include "Blah Blah Blah," "Delishious," "Katinkitschka," and "Somebody from Somewhere." The film also features Rhapsody in Rivets, which is condensed from the score of Second Rhapsody, possibly by Hugo Friedhofer. (It has been a common misconception that the composer originally wrote the music for the film sequence and subsequently expanded it into a concert work.) Gershwin also contributed other sequences for the score, but only a five-minute dream sequence called The Melting Pot and the six-minute Rhapsody in Rivets made the final cut. Fox Film Corporation rejected the rest of the score.

Gaynor plays a Scottish girl emigrating by ship to America who runs afoul of the authorities and has to go on the run, falling in with a ragtag group of immigrant musicians in Manhattan. Gaynor and Farrell made almost a dozen films together, including Frank Borzage's classics Seventh Heaven (1927), Street Angel (1928), and Lucky Star (1929). Gaynor won the first Academy Award for Best Actress for the first two and F. W. Murnau's Sunrise: A Song of Two Humans.

== Preservation status ==
On December 14, 2011, Turner Classic Movies aired a print of the film restored by George Eastman House.

On September 22, 2013, it was announced that a musicological critical edition of the full orchestral score will be eventually released. The Gershwin family, working in conjunction with the Library of Congress and the University of Michigan, are working to make scores available to the public that represent Gershwin's true intent. The entire Gershwin project may take 30 to 40 years to complete, and it is unclear when the score to Delicious will be released. It will be the first time this score has ever been published.

== See also ==
- List of early color feature films
