= Tess of the Storm Country (1932 film) =

1932 film

- Charles Farrell and Janet Gaynor
- Directed by: Alfred Santell
- Screenplay by: Sonya Levien; S. N. Behrman
- Based on: Grace Miller White(novel); Rupert Hughes(play)
- Produced by: William Fox
- Starring: Janet Gaynor; Charles Farrell
- Cinematography: Hal Mohr
- Edited by: Ralph Dietrich (uncredited)
- Music by: Louis De Francesco (uncredited)
- Distributed by: Fox Film Corporation
- Release dates: November 19, 1932 (New York City); November 20, 1932 (U.S.)
- Running time: 75 minutes
- Country: United States
- Language: English

Tess of the Storm Country is a 1932 American pre-Code Fox Film Corporation drama film directed by Alfred Santell and starring Janet Gaynor, Charles Farrell and Dudley Digges. It is based on the novel of the same name by Grace Miller White and its adaptation for the stage by Rupert Hughes.

Gaynor and Farrell appeared in numerous films together, including Frank Borzage's classics Seventh Heaven (1927), Street Angel (1928) and Lucky Star (1929).

The film's copyright was renewed in 1960.

== Cast ==
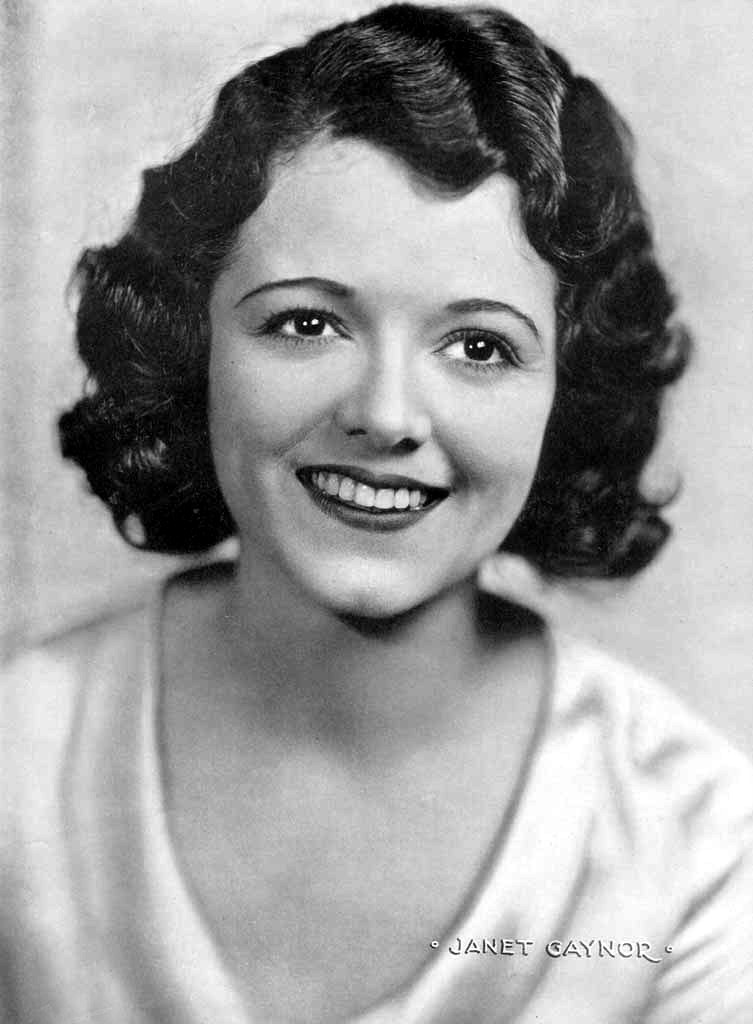
Janet Gaynor

- Janet Gaynor as Tess Howland
- Charles Farrell as Frederick Garfield Jr.
- Dudley Digges as Captain Howland
- Dan Green as Katsura
- June Clyde as Teola Garfield
- Claude Gillingwater as Frederick Garfield Sr.
- George Meeker as Dan Taylor
- Sarah Padden as Old Martha
- Edward Pawley as Ben Letts

== Reception ==
In a contemporary review for The New York Times, critic Andre Sennwald called Tess of the Storm Country "a pleasant resurrection" of the story and wrote that the film is "excellently acted".

== See also ==
- List of American films of 1932
- 1932 in film
