= Charles Farrell =

American actor (1900–1990)

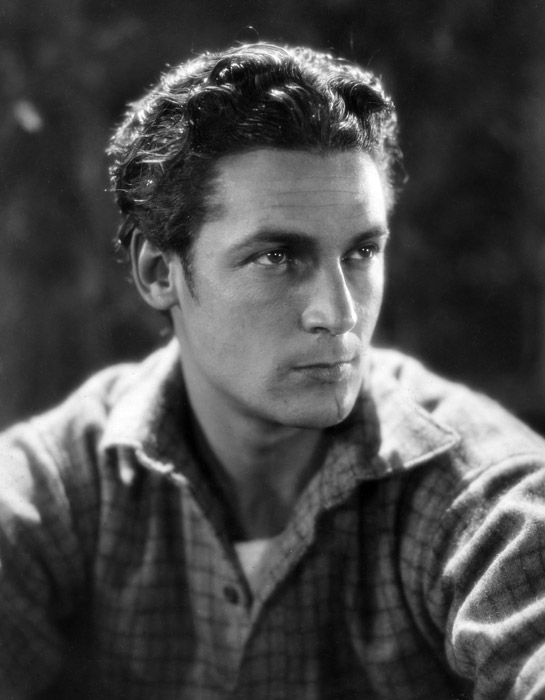
- Farrell in 7th Heaven (1927)
- Born: Charles David Farrell; August 9, 1900; Walpole, Massachusetts, U.S.
- Died: May 6, 1990 (aged 89); Palm Springs, California, U.S.
- Resting place: Welwood Murray Cemetery, Palm Springs, California
- Education: Boston University
- Occupations: Actor; politician
- Years active: 1923–1956
- Known for: 7th Heaven; Street Angel; Lucky Star; Liliom
- Spouse: Virginia Valli (m. 1931; died 1968)

5th Mayor of Palm Springs
- In office April 1948 – July 1953
- Preceded by: Clarence E. Hyde
- Succeeded by: Florian Boyd

Charles David Farrell (August 9, 1900 – May 6, 1990) was an American film actor (whose height was in the 1920s and 1930s) and later Mayor of Palm Springs, serving from 1947 to 1955. Farrell was known for his onscreen romances with actress Janet Gaynor in more than a dozen films, including 7th Heaven, Street Angel, and Lucky Star. Later in life, he starred on TV in the 1950s sitcoms My Little Margie and played himself in The Charles Farrell Show. He was also among the early developers of Palm Springs.

== Early life ==
Farrell was born on August 9, 1900, in South Walpole, Massachusetts, the younger of two. The family moved to East Walpole when Farrell was 4 and he later attended Walpole High School, where he played football and graduated in 1918. He attended Boston University's business administration program but dropped out. Following this, he traveled to California to pursue a career in the business end of the motion-picture industry.

Farrell's father variously owned restaurants, a drug store, and several movie theaters, including one in Onset and at Revere Beach. The family moved to Onset around 1920 and, by 1927, the Farrells owned three theaters.

== Career ==
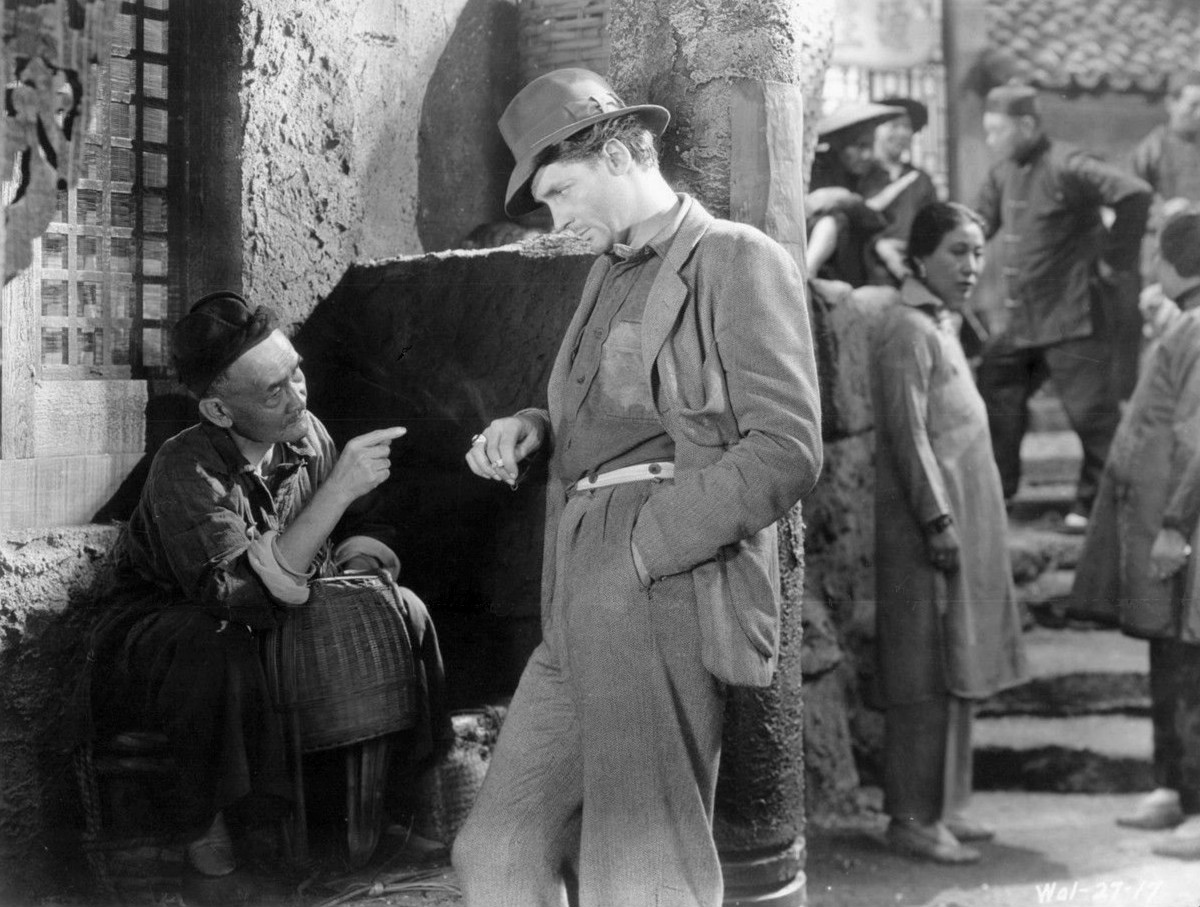
The Man Who Came Back (1931)

Farrell began his career as an extra and bit player for Paramount Pictures in films such as The Hunchback of Notre Dame, The Ten Commandments, and The Cheat. After signing on with Fox Film, he was paired with fellow newcomer Janet Gaynor in the romantic drama 7th Heaven. The film's success meant they went on to star opposite one another in more than a dozen films in the late 1920s and into the talkie era of the early 1930s. While his initial years in the talkies were not much of an issue, Farrell's "Boston Brahmin" eventually fell out of favor with Fox and he was offered a number of roles he refused, as he felt they were beneath him.

In 1934, as his acting career started winding down, he and Ralph Bellamy opened the Palm Springs Racquet Club in Palm Springs, California. He came out to Australia to star in The Flying Doctor (1936).

He joined the U.S. Navy in 1942, where he worked as an administrative officer with the Fighting Squadron 17 and later spent time on the USS Hornet. A major player in the developing prosperity of Palm Springs in the 1930s through the 1960s, Farrell was elected to the city council in 1946 and served as mayor from 1947 to 1955.

He appeared several times on the radio show The Jack Benny Program, including the 1941 episode "Murder at the Racquet Club." He returned to the screen to play Gale Storm's father Vern Albright on My Little Margie between 1952 and 1955. In 1956, he starred in The Charlie Farrell Show, where he played a fictionalized version of himself as the owner of a Racquet Club.

Farrell sold his real-life Racquet club in 1959 for $1.2 million but returned as club operator in 1965 when it was sold again.

== Personal life ==
In 1927, Farrell named Carmelita Geraghty, Greta Nissen, Virginia Valli, and Janet Gaynor as his "best girl friends" and "pals" and said that any romance between him and Nissen was fabricated by the tabloids. Farrell was romantically involved with Janet Gaynor between 1926 and 1929, when she married San Francisco businessman Lydell Peck. He referred to their relationship as akin to the love between a brother and sister; Gaynor similarly said, "I think we loved each other more than we were 'in love.'" She mentioned, however, that she married Peck in part "to get away from Charlie."

Farrell married Virginia Valli, a former silent film star, on February 1, 1931, in Yonkers, New York and the couple settled in Palm Springs. She died from a stroke on September 24, 1968, after which, according to historian Stephen O'Brien, he became increasingly reclusive until his death from heart failure on May 6, 1990, in Palm Springs. He was buried next to his wife at the Welwood Murray Cemetery.

== Honours and legacy ==
Farrell was awarded two stars on the Hollywood Walk of Fame in 1960, located at 7021 Hollywood Boulevard for motion pictures and 1617 Vine Street for television. In 1992, a Golden Palm Star on the Palm Springs Walk of Stars was dedicated to him. Farrell Drive in Palm Springs was named in his honor as one of the developers of the city, and a statue of Farrell was dedicated in front of Palm Springs International Airport in 1999.

== Filmography ==
Features:

- The Cheat (1923) – (uncredited)
- The Hunchback of Notre Dame (1923) – (uncredited)
- Rosita (1923) – (uncredited)
- A Woman of Paris (1923) – Man in Nightclub (uncredited)
- The Ten Commandments (1923) – Israelite Slave (uncredited)
- Three Women (1924) – College Boy (uncredited)
- The Golden Bed (1925) – (uncredited)
- Wings of Youth (1925) – Ted Spaulding
- The Love Hour (1925) – Kid Lewis
- The Freshman (1925) – Student Bell Ringer at Frolic (uncredited)
- The Clash of the Wolves (1925) – Dave Weston
- Sandy (1926) – Timmy
- A Trip to Chinatown (1926) – Gayne Wilder
- Old Ironsides (1926) – The Commodore
- 7th Heaven (1927) – Chico
- The Rough Riders (1927) – Stewart Van Brunt
- Street Angel (1928) – Gino
- Fazil (1928) – Prince Fazil
- The Red Dance (1928) – Grand Duke Eugen
- The River (1928) – Allen John Spender
- Lucky Star (1929) – Timothy Osborn
- Happy Days (1929) – Himself
- Sunny Side Up (1929) – Jack Cromwell
- City Girl (1930) – Lem Tustine
- High Society Blues (1930) – Eddie Granger
- Liliom (1930) – Liliom
- The Princess and the Plumber (1930) – Charlie Peters / Albert Bowers
- The Man Who Came Back (1931) – Stephen Randolph
- Body and Soul (1931) – Mal Andrews
- Merely Mary Ann (1931) – John Lonsdale
- Heartbreak (1931) – John Merrick
- Delicious (1931) – Larry Beaumont
- After Tomorrow (1932) – Peter Piper
- The First Year (1932) – Tommy Tucker
- Wild Girl (1932) – Billy – the Stranger
- Tess of the Storm Country (1932) – Frederick Garfield Jr
- Aggie Appleby, Maker of Men (1933) – Adoniram 'Schlumpy' Schlump / Red Branahan
- Girl Without a Room (1933) – Tom Duncan
- The Big Shakedown (1934) – Jimmy Morrell
- Change of Heart (1934) – Chris Thring
- Falling in Love (1935) – Howard Elliott
- Forbidden Heaven (1935) – Mr. Archer / Nibs
- Fighting Youth (1935) – Larry Davis
- The Flying Doctor (1936) – Sandy Nelson
- Moonlight Sonata (1937) – Eric Molander
- Midnight Menace (1937) – Briant Gaunt
- Flight to Fame (1938) – Captain Robert Lawrence
- Just Around the Corner (1938) – Jeff Hale
- Tail Spin (1939) – Bud
- The Deadly Game (1941) – Barry Scott

Short Subjects:

- The Gosh-Darn Mortgage (1926) – Joe Hoskins
- Hollywood Hobbies (1935) – Himself
- Screen Snapshots Series 15, No. 7 (1936) – Himself

== See also ==
- List of actor-politicians

Political offices
Preceded by Clarence E. Hyde	Mayor of Palm Springs, California; April 1948 – July 1953	Succeeded by Florian Boyd
