= Janet Gaynor =

American actress (1906–1984)

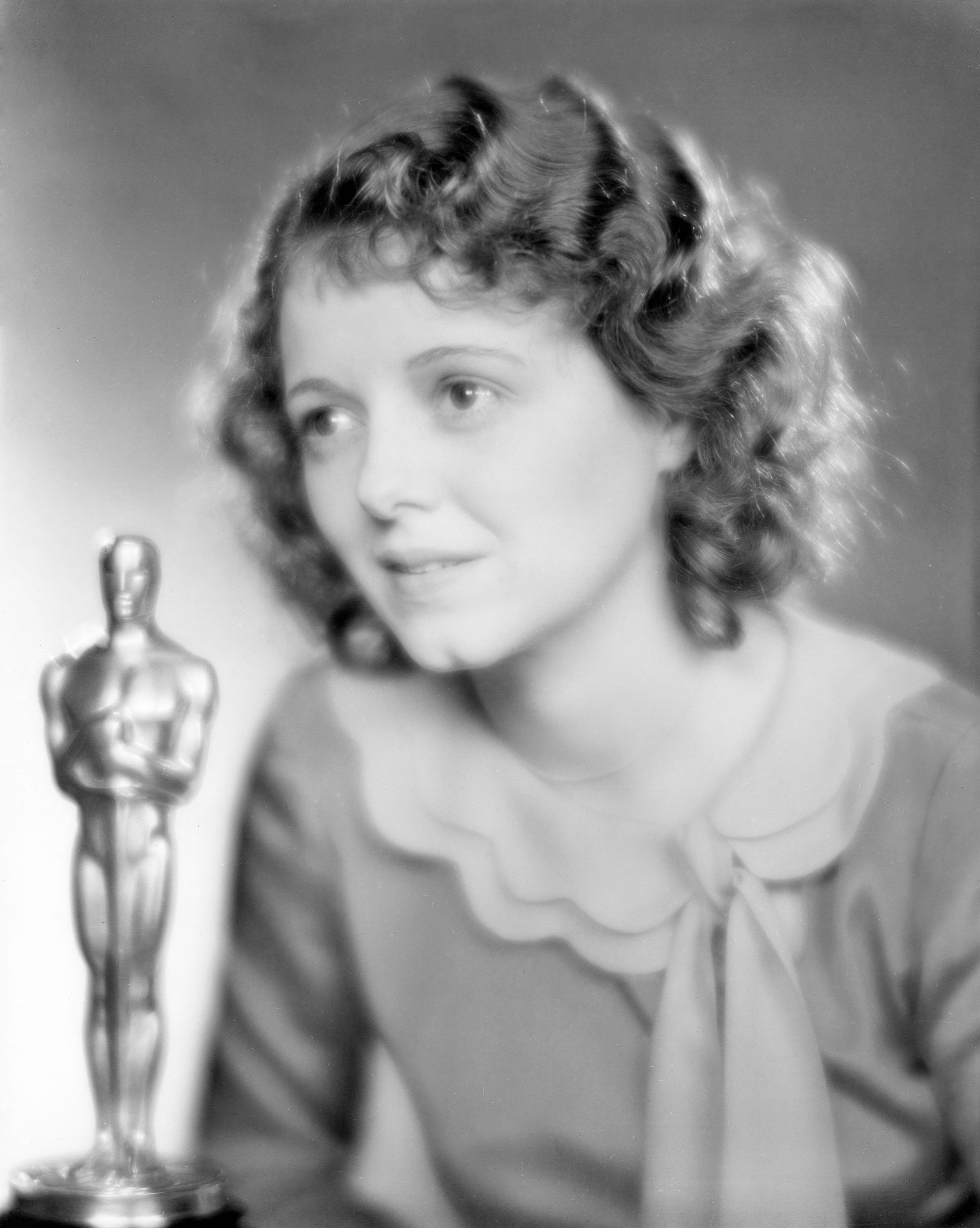
- Gaynor in 1929
- Born: Laura Augusta Gainor; October 6, 1906; Philadelphia, Pennsylvania, U.S.
- Died: September 14, 1984 (aged 77); Palm Springs, California, U.S.
- Resting place: Hollywood Forever Cemetery
- Occupation: Actress
- Years active: 1924–1939; 1950s–1982
- Spouses: Jesse Lydell Peck (m. 1929; div. 1933) Adrian (m. 1939; died 1959) Paul Gregory (m. 1964)
- Children: 1

Janet Gaynor (born Laura Augusta Gainor; October 6, 1906 – September 14, 1984) was an American actress. She began her career as an extra in shorts and silent films. After signing with Fox Film (later 20th Century-Fox) in 1926, she rose to fame and became one of the biggest box office draws of the era. In 1929, she became the first recipient of the Academy Award for Best Actress for her performances in 7th Heaven, Sunrise: A Song of Two Humans (both 1927) and Street Angel (1928), the only occasion an actress won one Oscar for multiple film roles. Her success continued into the sound film era; for A Star Is Born (1937), she received a second Best Actress Academy Award nomination.

After retiring from acting in 1939, Gaynor married film costume designer Adrian, with whom she had a son. She briefly returned to acting in films and television in the 1950s and later became an oil painter. In 1980, Gaynor made her Broadway debut in the stage adaptation of the 1971 film Harold and Maude, and appeared in the touring theatrical production of On Golden Pond. She died in 1984, from health complications caused by injuries sustained in a 1982 automobile accident.

== Early life ==
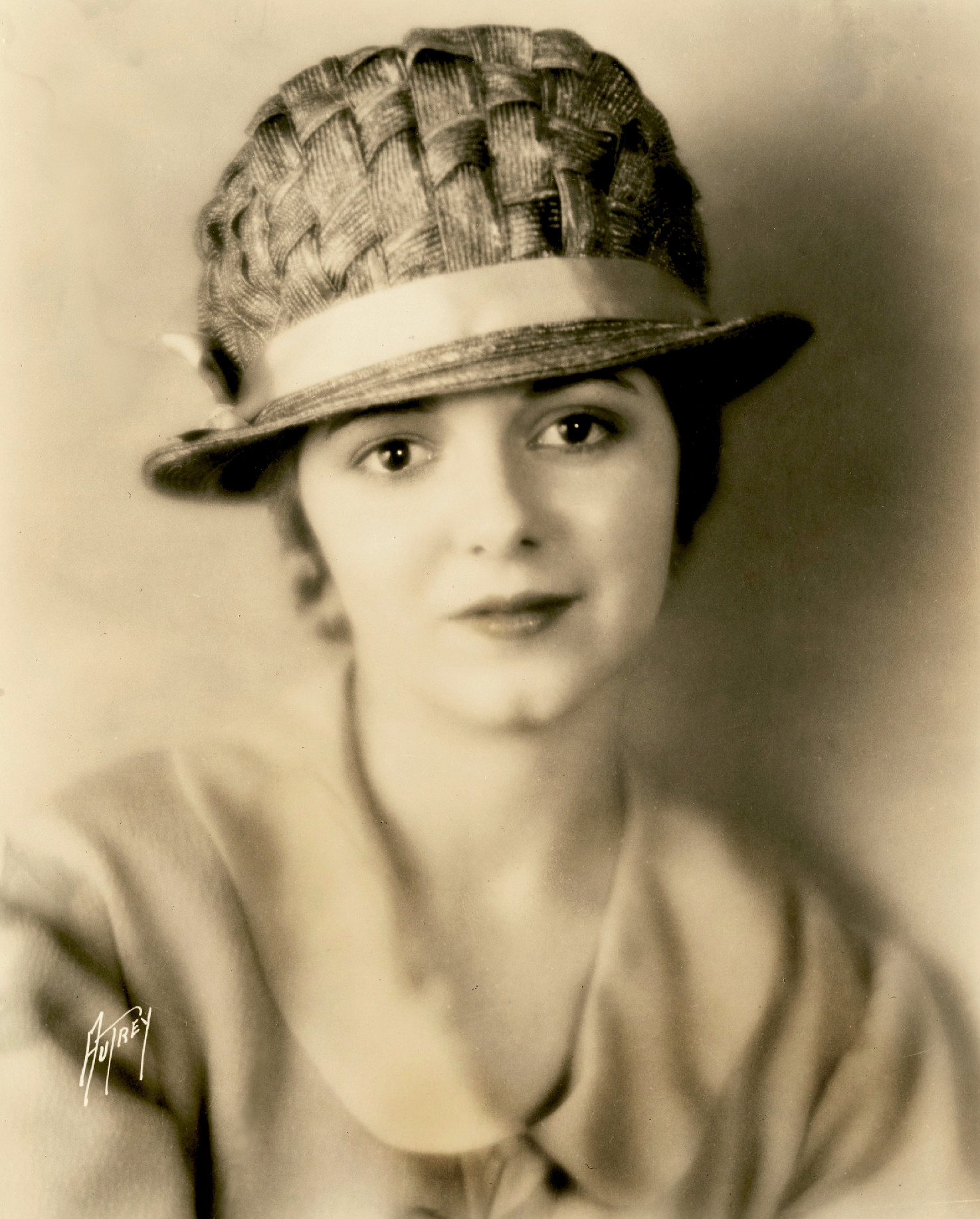
Gaynor in her most famous silent film, F. W. Murnau's Sunrise: A Song of Two Humans (1927)

Gaynor was born Laura Augusta Gainor (some sources stated Gainer) in Germantown, Philadelphia. Nicknamed "Lolly" as a child, she was the younger of two daughters born to Laura (Buhl) and Frank De Witt Gainor. Frank Gainor worked as a theatrical painter and paperhanger. When Gaynor was a toddler, her father began teaching her how to sing, dance, and perform acrobatics. As a child in Philadelphia, she began acting in school plays. After her parents divorced in 1914, Gaynor, her sister, and her mother moved to Chicago. Shortly thereafter, her mother married electrician Harry C. Jones. The family later moved to San Francisco.

After graduating from San Francisco Polytechnic High School in 1923, Gaynor spent the winter in Melbourne, Florida, where she did stage work. Upon returning to San Francisco, Gaynor, her mother, and stepfather moved to Los Angeles, where she could pursue an acting career. She was initially hesitant to do so and enrolled at Hollywood Secretarial School. She supported herself by working in a shoe store and later as a theatre usher. Her mother and stepfather continued to encourage her to become an actress and she began making the rounds to the studios (accompanied by her stepfather) to find film work.

Gaynor won her first professional acting job on December 26, 1924, as an extra in a Hal Roach comedy short. This led to more extra work in feature films and shorts for Film Booking Offices of America and Universal. Universal eventually hired her as a stock player for $50 a week. Six weeks after being hired by Universal, an executive at Fox Film Corporation offered her a screen test for a supporting role in the film The Johnstown Flood (1926). Her performance in the film caught the attention of Fox executives, who signed her to a five-year contract and began to cast her in leading roles. Later that year, Gaynor was selected as one of the WAMPAS Baby Stars (along with Joan Crawford, Dolores del Río, Mary Astor, and others).

== Career ==
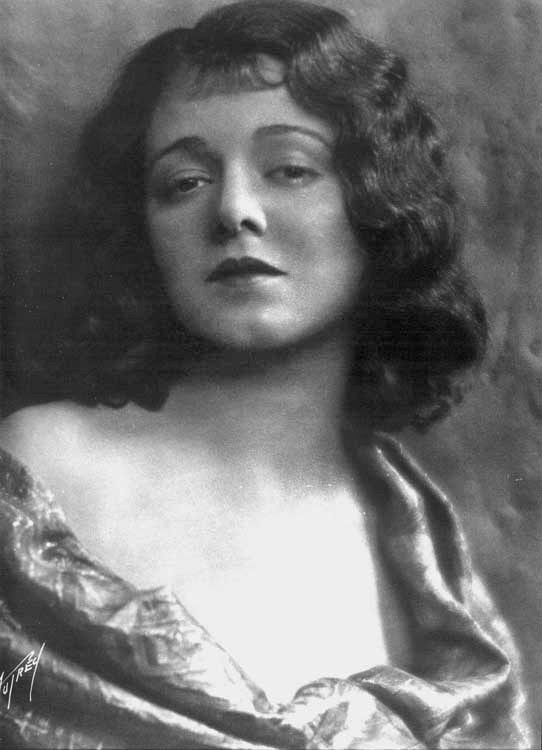
1927 studio portrait

By 1927, Gaynor was one of Hollywood's leading ladies. Her image was that of a sweet, wholesome and pure young woman, who was notable for playing her roles with depth and sensitivity. Her performances in 7th Heaven, the first of 12 films she would make with actor Charles Farrell; Sunrise: A Song of Two Humans, directed by F. W. Murnau; and Street Angel, also with Charles Farrell, earned her the first Academy Award for Best Actress in 1929, when for the first and only time the award was granted for multiple roles, on the basis of total recent work rather than for one particular performance. This practice was prohibited three years later by a new Academy of Motion Picture Arts and Sciences rule. Gaynor was not only the first actress to win the award, but at 22, was the youngest until 1986, when actress Marlee Matlin, 21, won for her role in Children of a Lesser God.

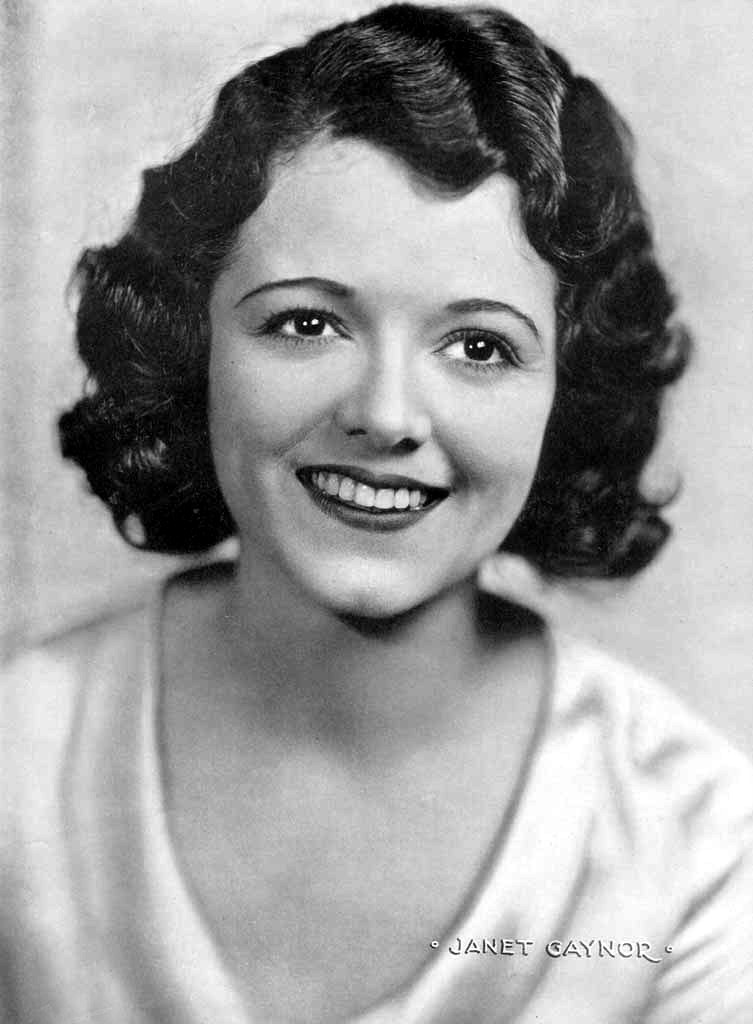
Gaynor, c. 1931

Gaynor was one of only a handful of established lead actresses who made a successful transition to sound films. In 1929, she was re-teamed with Charles Farrell (the pair was known as "America's favorite love birds") for the musical film Sunny Side Up. During the early 1930s, Gaynor was one of Fox's most popular actresses and one of Hollywood's biggest box-office draws. In 1931 and 1932, she and Marie Dressler were tied as the number-one draw at the box office. After Dressler's death in 1934, Gaynor held the top spot alone. She often was cited as a successor to Mary Pickford, and was cast in remakes of two Pickford films: Daddy Long Legs (1931) and Tess of the Storm Country (1932). Gaynor drew the line at a proposed remake of Rebecca of Sunnybrook Farm, which she considered "too juvenile".

Gaynor continued to garner top billing for roles in State Fair (1933) with Will Rogers and The Farmer Takes a Wife (1935), which introduced Henry Fonda to the screen as Gaynor's leading man. However, when Darryl F. Zanuck merged his fledgling studio, Twentieth Century Pictures, with Fox Film Corporation to form 20th Century-Fox, her status became precarious, and even tertiary to those of burgeoning actresses Loretta Young and Shirley Temple. According to press reports at the time, Gaynor held out on signing with 20th Century-Fox until her salary was raised from $1,000 per week to $3,000. The studio quickly issued a statement denying that Gaynor was holding out for more money. She quietly signed a new contract, the terms of which were never made public.

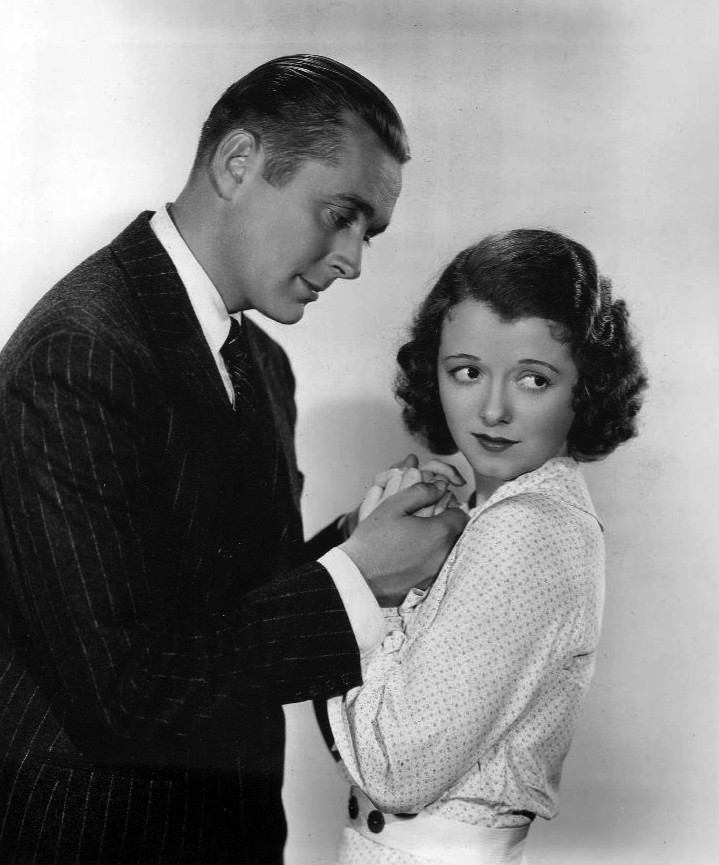
With James Dunn in Change of Heart (1934)

Gaynor received top billing above Constance Bennett, Loretta Young, and Tyrone Power in Ladies in Love (1937), but her box-office appeal had begun to wane: Once ranked number one, she had dropped to number 24. She considered retiring due to her frustration with studio executives, who continued to cast her in the same type of role that brought her fame, while audiences' tastes were changing. After 20th Century-Fox executives proposed that her contract be re-negotiated, and that she be demoted to featured player status, Gaynor left the studio, but her retirement plans were quashed when David O. Selznick offered her the leading role in a new film to be produced by his company, Selznick International Pictures. Selznick, who was friendly with Gaynor off-screen, was convinced that audiences would enjoy seeing her portray a character closer to her true personality. He believed that she possessed the perfect combination of humor, charm, vulnerability, and innocence for the role of aspiring actress Esther Blodgett (later Vicki Lester) in A Star Is Born. Gaynor accepted the role. The romantic drama was filmed in Technicolor, and co-starred Fredric March. Released in 1937, it was an enormous hit, and earned Gaynor her second Academy Award nomination for Best Actress; she lost to Luise Rainer for The Good Earth.

A Star Is Born revitalized Gaynor's career, and she was cast in the screwball comedy The Young in Heart (1938) with Paulette Goddard. That film was a modest hit, but by then, Gaynor had definitely decided to retire. She later explained: "I had been working steadily for 17 long years; making movies was really all I knew of life. I just wanted to have time to know other things. Most of all, I wanted to fall in love. I wanted to get married. I wanted a child. And I knew that in order to have these things, one had to make time for them. So, I simply stopped making movies. Then, as if by a miracle, everything I really wanted happened." At the top of the industry, she retired at age 33.

== Later years ==
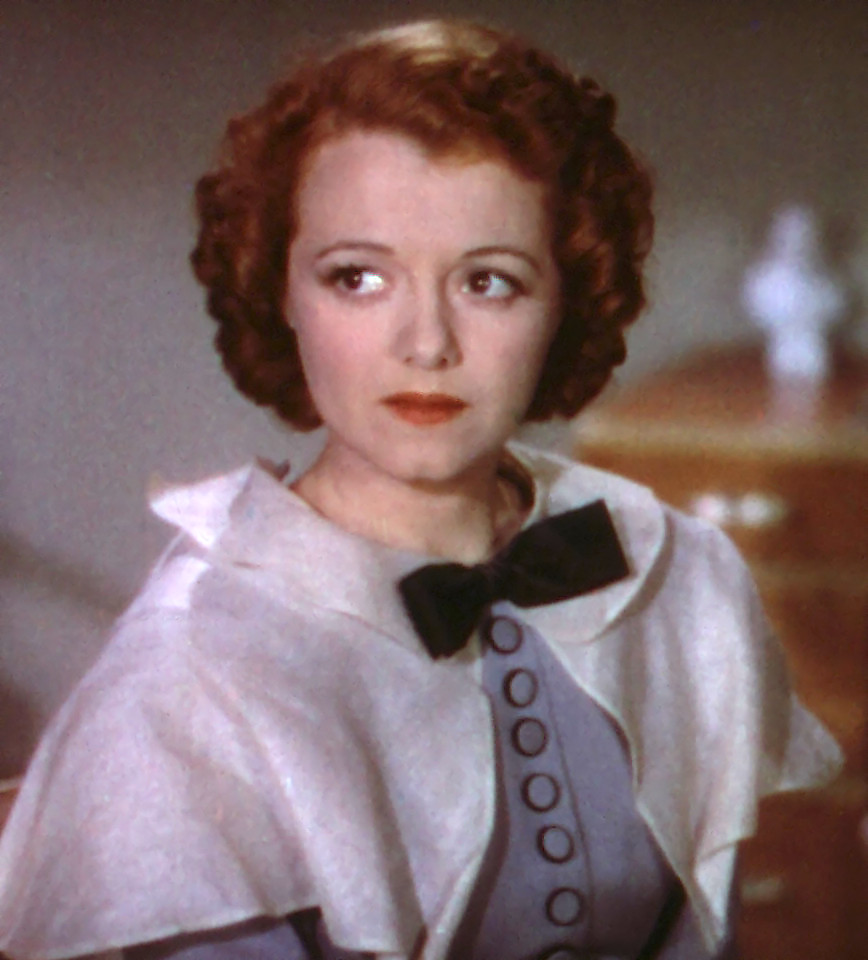
Gaynor plays the titular role in A Star Is Born (1937)

In August 1939, Gaynor married Hollywood costume designer Adrian, with whom she had a son in 1940. The couple divided their time between their 250-acre cattle ranch in Anápolis, Brazil, and their homes in New York and California. Both were also heavily involved in the fashion and arts community. Gaynor returned to acting in the early 1950s with appearances in live television series, including Medallion Theatre, Lux Video Theatre, and General Electric Theater. In 1957, she appeared in her final film role as Dick Sargent's mother in the musical comedy Bernardine, starring Pat Boone and Terry Moore. In November 1959, she made her stage debut in the play The Midnight Sun in New Haven, Connecticut. The play, which Gaynor later called "a disaster", was not well received and closed shortly after its debut.

Gaynor also became an accomplished oil painter of vegetable and flower still lifes. She sold over 200 paintings and had four showings under the Wally Findlay Galleries banner in New York, Chicago, and Palm Beach from 1975 to February 1982.

In 1980, Gaynor made her Broadway debut as Maude in the stage adaptation of the 1971 film Harold and Maude. She received good reviews for her performance, but the play was panned by critics and closed after 21 performances. Later that year, she reunited with her Servants' Entrance and State Fair co-star Lew Ayres to film an episode of the anthology series The Love Boat. It was the first television appearance Gaynor had made since the 1950s and was her last screen role. In February 1982, she starred in the touring production of On Golden Pond. This was her final acting role.

== Personal life ==
=== Marriages and relationships ===
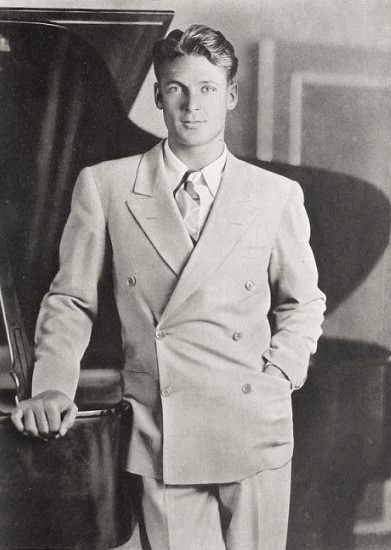
Charles Farrell in 1931

Gaynor was romantically involved with her friend and frequent co-star Charles Farrell during their work together in silent films until she married her first husband. Choosing to keep their relationship out of the public eye, Gaynor and Farrell were often assisted by mutual friend Douglas Fairbanks Jr. in maintaining the ruse. Looking back, Fairbanks would later recall, "We three were so chummy that I became their 'beard,' the cover-up for their secret romance. I would drive them out to a little rundown, wooden house well south of Los Angeles, near the sea. I'd leave them there and go sailing or swimming until [it was] time to collect them and then we'd all have a bit of dinner."

According to Gaynor's biographer Sarah Baker, Farrell proposed marriage during the filming of Lucky Star, but the two never followed through with it. In her later years, Gaynor would hold their different personalities accountable for their eventual separation.

Gaynor was married three times and had one child. Her first marriage was to lawyer Jesse Lydell Peck, whom she married on September 11, 1929. Gaynor's attorney announced the couple's separation in late December 1932. She was granted a divorce on April 7, 1933. On August 14, 1939, she married MGM costume designer Adrian in Yuma, Arizona. This relationship has been called a lavender marriage because Adrian was openly gay within the film community, and Gaynor herself was rumored to be bisexual. The couple had one son. Gaynor and Adrian remained married until Adrian's death from a stroke on September 13, 1959.

On December 24, 1964, Gaynor married her longtime friend, stage producer Paul Gregory, to whom she remained married until her death. The two maintained a home in Desert Hot Springs, California, and owned 3,000 acres of land in Brazil, situated near Brasília.

=== Friendship with Margaret Lindsay ===
Margaret Lindsay and Gaynor appeared together in the film Paddy the Next Best Thing (1933). Lindsay and Gaynor often vacationed together for the next several years.

=== Friendship with Mary Martin ===
Gaynor and her husband Paul Gregory traveled frequently with her close friend Mary Martin and her husband Richard Halliday. A Brazilian press report noted that Gaynor and Martin briefly lived with their respective husbands in Anápolis, state of Goiás at a ranch (fazenda in Portuguese) in the 1950s and 1960s. Both houses remain intact as of 2021. There is a project by the Jan Magalinski Institute to restore their houses to create a Cinema Museum of Goiás.

== Car wreck and eventual death ==
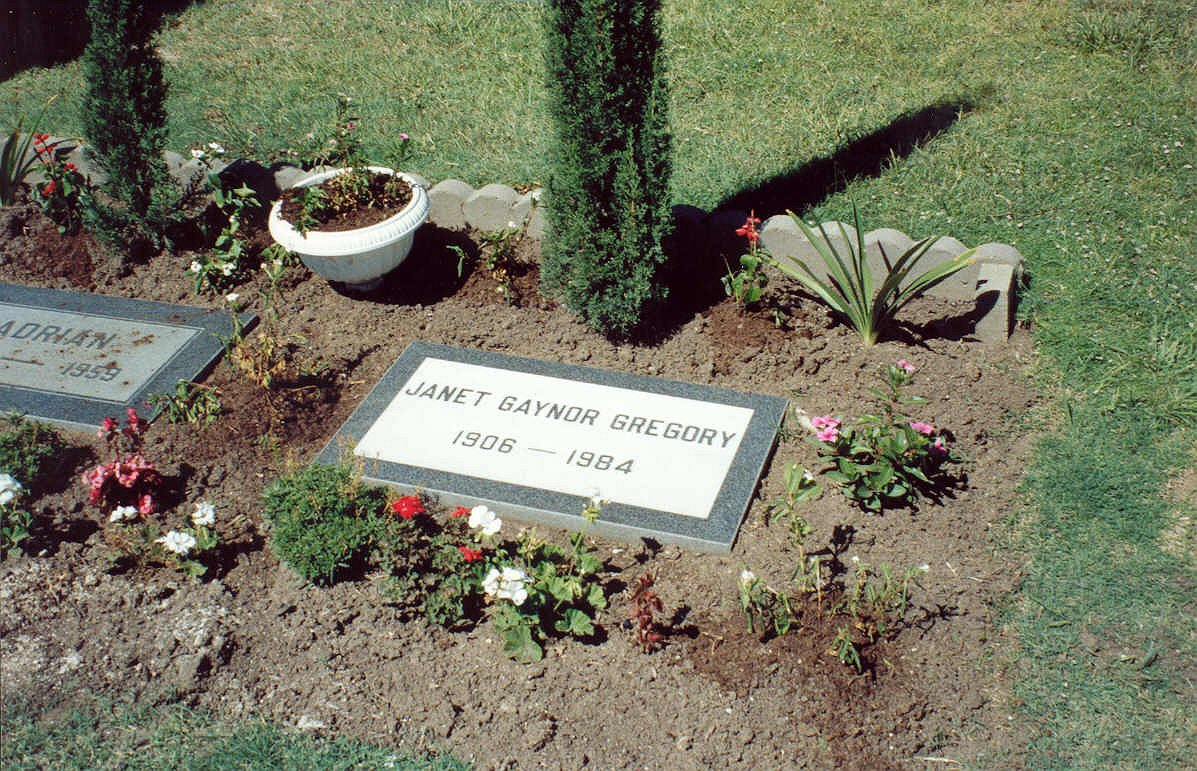
Gaynor's grave at Hollywood Forever Cemetery

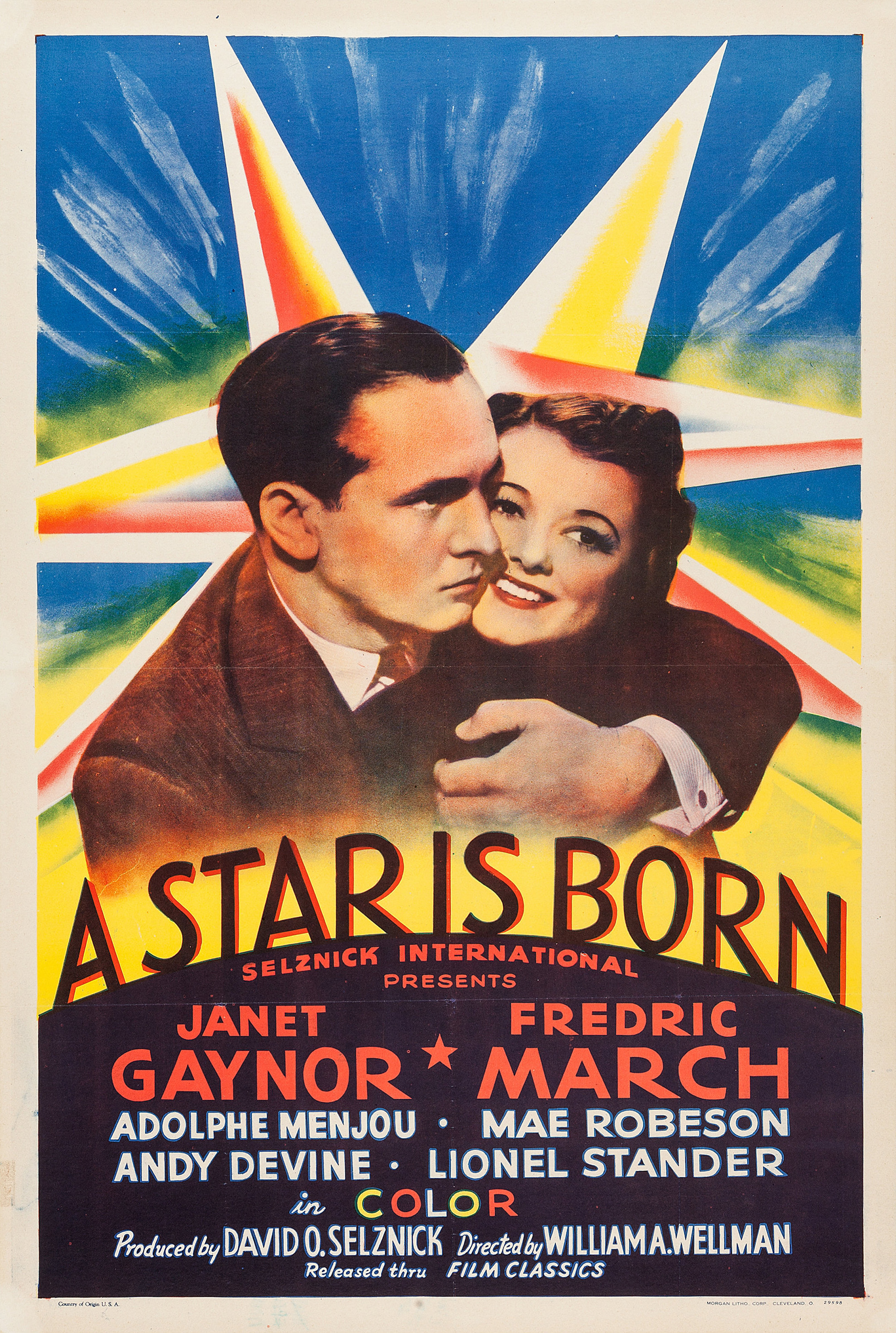
A Star Is Born (1937 film, 1945 poster)

On the evening of September 5, 1982, Gaynor, her husband Paul Gregory, actress Mary Martin, and Martin's manager Ben Washer were involved in a serious car wreck in San Francisco en route to a Chinatown restaurant. A van ran a red light at the corner of California and Franklin Streets and crashed into the Luxor taxicab in which the group was riding, knocking it into a tree. Washer was killed, Martin sustained two broken ribs and a broken pelvis, and Gaynor's husband suffered two broken legs. Gaynor sustained several serious injuries, including 11 broken ribs, a fractured collarbone, pelvic fractures, a punctured lung, and injuries to her bladder and kidney. Robert Cato, the driver of the van, was arrested on two counts of felony drunk driving, reckless driving, speeding, running a red light, and vehicular homicide.

Cato, a former policeman, in the previous year, had been charged with two felonies for using his car as a deadly weapon against a motorist, Mellicent Wauters, a dental assistant and amateur actress, with whom he had argued over a parking spot. Cato had been placed on informal probation; subsequently, the charges had been dropped.

Cato pleaded not guilty and was later released on $10,000 bail (equivalent to $27,000 in 2024). On March 15, 1983, he was found guilty of drunk driving and vehicular homicide and was sentenced to three years in prison.

As a result of her injuries, Gaynor was hospitalized for four months and underwent two surgeries to repair a perforated bladder and internal bleeding. She recovered sufficiently to return to her home in Desert Hot Springs, but continued to experience health issues due to the injuries and required frequent hospitalizations. Shortly before her death, she was hospitalized for pneumonia and other ailments. On September 14, 1984, Gaynor died at Desert Hospital in Palm Springs at the age of 77. Her doctor, Bart Apfelbaum, attributed her death to the 1982 car wreck and stated that Gaynor "never recovered" from her injuries. In September 1984, these injuries were officially ruled to have caused her death.

Gaynor is buried at Hollywood Forever Cemetery next to her second husband, Adrian. Her headstone reads "Janet Gaynor Gregory", her legal name after her marriage to her third husband, producer and director Paul Gregory.

== Honors ==
In 1929, at 23 years old, Gaynor won the first Academy Award for Best Actress.

For her contribution to the motion picture industry, Gaynor has a star on the Hollywood Walk of Fame at 6284 Hollywood Blvd.

On March 1, 1978, Howard W. Koch, then the president of the Academy of Motion Picture Arts and Sciences, presented Gaynor with a citation for her "truly immeasurable contribution to the art of motion pictures".

In 1979, Gaynor was awarded the Order of the Southern Cross for her cultural contributions to Brazil.

== Filmography ==
Features
Year	Title	Role	Notes
1924	Cupid's Rustler		Lost film Uncredited
1924	Young Ideas		Uncredited
1925	Dangerous Innocence		Lost film Uncredited
1925	The Burning Trail		Lost film Uncredited
1925	The Teaser		Lost film Uncredited
1925	The Plastic Age		Uncredited
1926	A Punch in the Nose	Bathing Beauty	Uncredited
1926	The Beautiful Cheat		Uncredited
1926	The Johnstown Flood	Anna Burger	
1926	Oh! What a Nurse!		Uncredited
1926	Skinner's Dress Suit		Uncredited
1926	The Shamrock Handicap	Lady Sheila O'Hara	
1926	The Galloping Cowboy		Lost film Uncredited
1926	The Man in the Saddle		Lost film Uncredited
1926	The Blue Eagle	Rose Kelly	
1926	The Midnight Kiss	Mildred Hastings	Lost film
1926	The Return of Peter Grimm	Catherine	
1926	Lazy Lightning		Uncredited
1926	The Stolen Ranch		Uncredited
1927	Two Girls Wanted	Marianna Wright	Lost film
1927	7th Heaven	Diane	Academy Award for Best Actress
1927	Sunrise: A Song of Two Humans	The Wife - Indre	Academy Award for Best Actress
1928	Street Angel	Angela	Academy Award for Best Actress
1928	4 Devils	Marion	Lost film
1929	Lucky Star	Mary Tucker	Released as silent and sound versions, sound version is lost
1929	Happy Days	Herself	
1929	Christina	Christina	Lost film
1929	Sunny Side Up	Molly Carr	
1930	High Society Blues	Eleanor Divine	
1931	The Man Who Came Back	Angie Randolph	
1931	Daddy Long Legs	Judy Abbott	
1931	Merely Mary Ann	Mary Ann	
1931	Delicious	Heather Gordon	
1932	The First Year	Grace Livingston	
1932	Tess of the Storm Country	Tess Howland	
1933	State Fair	Margy Frake	
1933	Adorable	Princess Marie Christine, aka Mitzi	
1933	Paddy the Next Best Thing	Paddy Adair	
1934	Carolina	Joanna Tate	
1934	The Cardboard City	Herself	Cameo
1934	Change of Heart	Catherine Furness	
1934	Servants' Entrance	Hedda Nilsson aka Helga Brand	
1935	One More Spring	Elizabeth Cheney	
1935	The Farmer Takes a Wife	Molly Larkins	
1936	Small Town Girl	Katherine 'Kay' Brannan	
1936	Ladies in Love	Martha Kerenye	
1937	A Star Is Born	Esther Victoria Blodgett, aka Vicki Lester	Nominated - Academy Award for Best Actress
1938	Three Loves Has Nancy	Nancy Briggs	
1938	The Young in Heart	George-Anne Carleton	
1957	Bernardine	Mrs. Ruth Wilson	
1961	The Four of Us	Ann Hathaway, with George Murphy as Tom Hathaway	Ed James TV Pilot; Guest Stars: Herb Vigran Raymond Bailey

Short subject
Year	Title	Role	Notes
1924	All Wet		Uncredited
1925	The Haunted Honeymoon		Uncredited
1925	The Crook Buster		Uncredited
1926	WAMPAS Baby Stars of 1926	Herself	
1926	Ridin' for Love		Uncredited
1926	Fade Away Foster		Uncredited
1926	The Fire Barrier		Uncredited
1926	Don't Shoot		Uncredited
1926	Pep of the Lazy J	June Adams	Uncredited
1926	Martin of the Mounted		Uncredited
1926	45 Minutes from Hollywood		Uncredited
1927	The Horse Trader		Uncredited
1941	Meet the Stars #2: Baby Stars	Herself	

=== Awards and nominations ===
Awards
Year	Award	Category	Production	Result
1927	Academy Awards	Best Actress	7th Heaven	Won
1927	Academy Awards	Best Actress	Sunrise: A Song of Two Humans	Won
1928	Academy Awards	Best Actress	Street Angel	Won
1937	Academy Awards	Best Actress	A Star Is Born	Nominated
