= Lucky Star (1929 film) =

1929 film by Frank Borzage

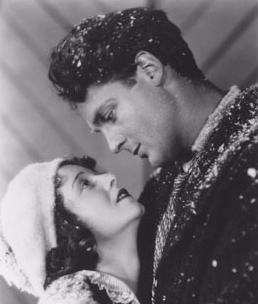
- Janet Gaynor and Charles Farrell
- Directed by: Frank Borzage
- Written by: John Hunter Booth; Harry H. Caldwell; Katherine Hilliker; Sonya Levien; Tristram Tupper
- Produced by: William Fox
- Starring: Janet Gaynor; Charles Farrell
- Cinematography: Chester A. Lyons; William Cooper Smith
- Edited by: Harry H. Caldwell; Katherine Hilliker
- Distributed by: Fox Film Corporation
- Release date: August 18, 1929
- Running time: 90 minutes
- Country: United States
- Languages: Sound (Part-Talkie); English Intertitles

Full movie

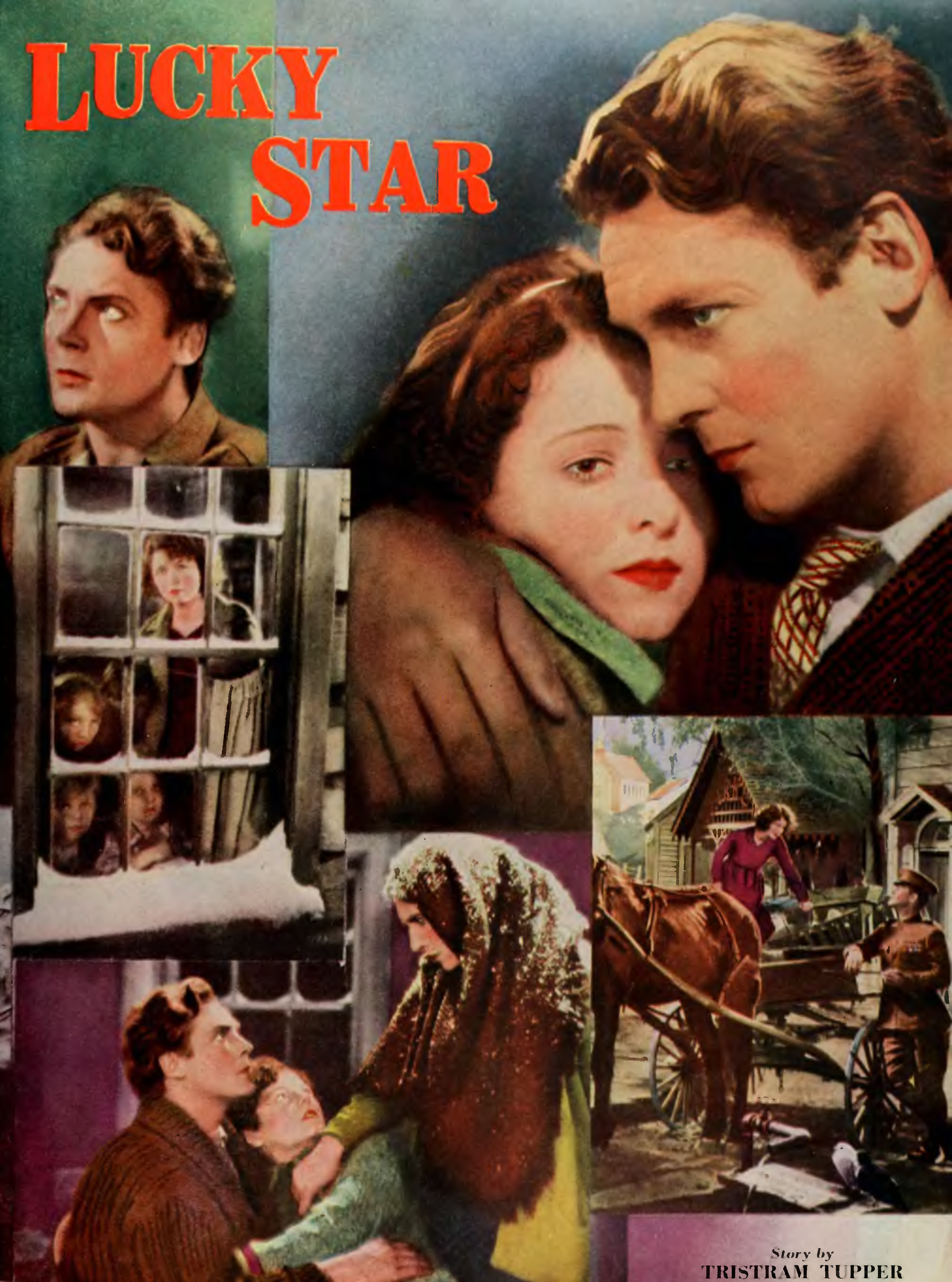
Lucky Star ad in The Film Daily, 1929

Lucky Star is a 1929 sound part-talkie American romantic drama film starring Janet Gaynor and Charles Farrell, and directed by Frank Borzage. In addition to sequences with audible dialogue or talking sequences, the film features a synchronized musical score and sound effects along with English intertitles. The last three reels of the film featured the dialogue or talking sequences. The soundtrack was recorded using the Movietone sound-on-film system. The plot involves the impact of World War I upon a farm girl (Gaynor) and a returning soldier (Farrell).

The movie was produced by William Fox with cinematography by Chester A. Lyons and William Cooper Smith, and the supporting cast includes Paul Fix and Guinn "Big Boy" Williams. In the previous two years, Borzage had also directed Gaynor in 7th Heaven and Street Angel, two of the three films (along with F.W. Murnau's Sunrise: A Song of Two Humans) for which Gaynor won the first Academy Award for Best Actress.

The film was produced in two versions- a silent version for the foreign market, and a partly talking version with sound effects and some dialogue for American release. Both versions were thought lost until the silent film was rediscovered in the archives of the Dutch Filmmuseum in the late 1980s and subsequently restored. The talking version of the film remains lost.

== Plot ==
Timothy Osborn and Martin Wrenn work as linemen for a utility in a rural area. Both flirt with Mary Tucker who is the daughter of a widowed dairy farmer, As the film begins it is 1917, and America becomes involved in World War I. Both men join the U.S. Army.

While on the battlefield, Wrenn and Osborn serve in the same unit, and Wrenn is a sergeant. Ordered to deliver food to men at the front, Wrenn instead purloins the truck that was to be used for the delivery for personal use, and Osborn uses a horse-drawn wagon to deliver the food. While going to the front he is injured by shellfire.

Both men return home, and Osborn now uses a wheelchair. He and Wrenn vie for Mary's affection. She becomes attached to Osborn and visits him every day. Wrenn, who had been kicked out of the Army, uses money and guile to win over Mary's mother, who pressures her to marry Wrenn. She stops seeing Osborn and agrees to marry Wrenn.

In the end, Osborn regains some use of his legs, walks through snow to confront Wrenn just before he is about to wed Mary. Townspeople intervene in their fight and put Wrenn on a train out of town. Osborn reunites with Mary.

== Cast ==
- Janet Gaynor as Mary Tucker
- Charles Farrell as Timothy Osborn
- Guinn "Big Boy" Williams as Martin Wrenn
- Paul Fix as Joe
- Hedwiga Reicher as Mrs. Tucker

== Music ==
The film featured a theme song entitled "Little Black Sheep" with words by L. Wolfe Gilbert and music by Abel Baer.

== See also ==
- List of early sound feature films (1926–1929)
