= Sunrise: A Song of Two Humans =

1927 silent film by F. W. Murnau

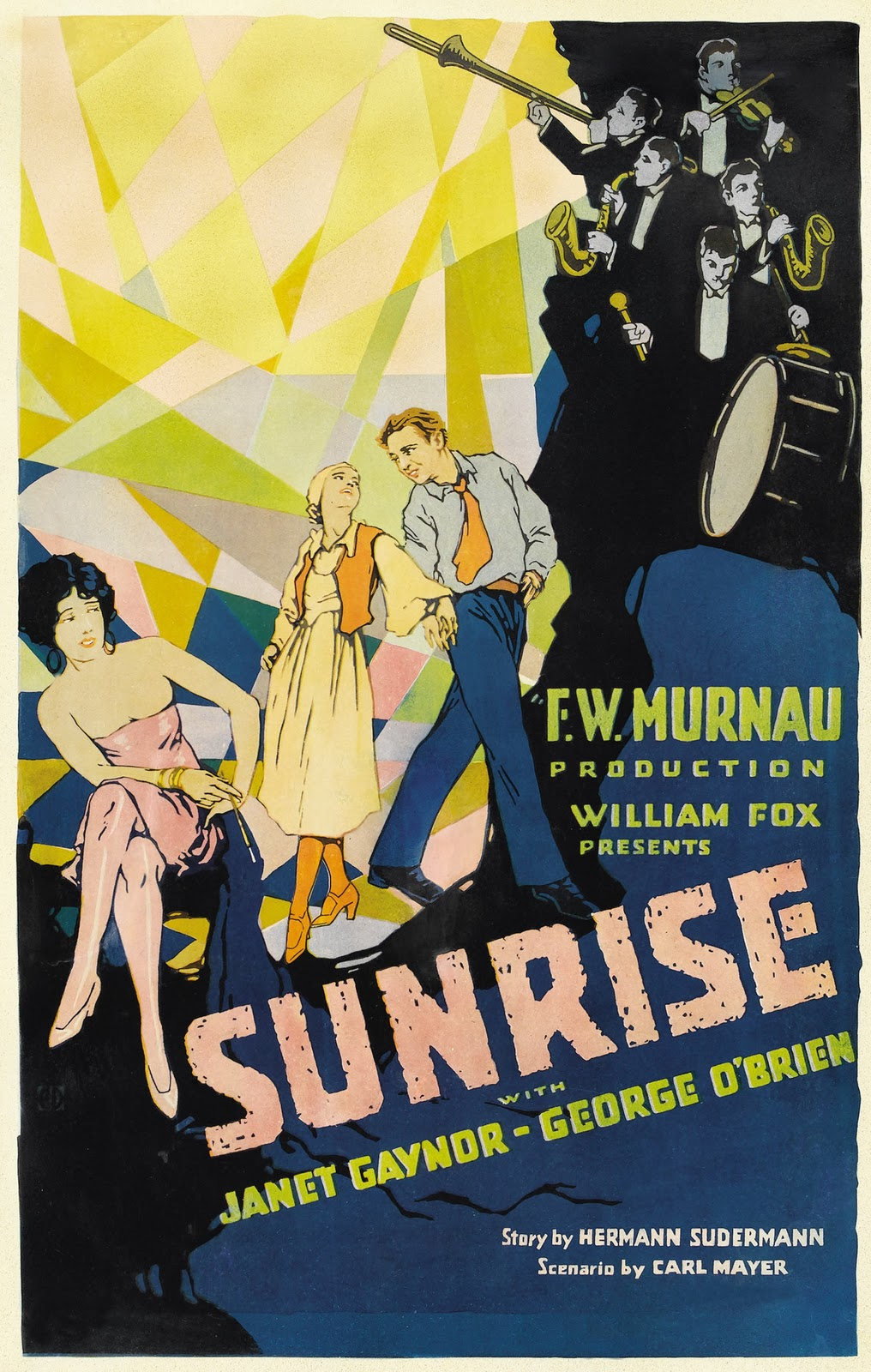
- Theatrical release poster
- Directed by: F. W. Murnau
- Screenplay by: Carl Mayer
- Based on: "The Excursion to Tilsit"; 1917 story in "Litauische Geschichten" by Hermann Sudermann
- Produced by: William Fox
- Starring: Janet Gaynor; George O'Brien
- Cinematography: Charles Rosher; Karl Struss
- Edited by: Harold Schuster
- Music by: Hugo Riesenfeld
- Production company: Fox Film Corporation
- Distributed by: Fox Film Corporation
- Release date: November 4, 1927
- Running time: 94 minutes
- Country: United States
- Languages: Sound (Synchronized) (English Intertitles)
- Box office: $818,000 (U.S. and Canada rentals)

Sunrise: A Song of Two Humans (also known as Sunrise) is a 1927 American synchronized sound romantic drama directed by German director F. W. Murnau (in his American film debut) and starring George O'Brien, Janet Gaynor, and Margaret Livingston. The film's plot follows a married farmer (O'Brien) who falls for a woman vacationing from the city (Livingston), who tries to convince him to murder his wife (Gaynor) in order to be with her. While the film has no audible dialogue, it was released with a synchronized musical score with sound effects using the Movietone sound-on-film process. The story was adapted by Carl Mayer from the short story "The Excursion to Tilsit", from the 1917 collection with the same title by Hermann Sudermann.

Murnau chose to use the then new Fox Movietone sound-on-film system, making Sunrise one of the first feature films with a synchronized musical score and sound effects soundtrack. The film incorporated Charles Gounod's 1872 composition Funeral March of a Marionette, which inspired its use as the theme for the television series Alfred Hitchcock Presents (1955–1965). Frédéric Chopin's A minor prelude also features prominently in orchestral arrangement. In 2016, the Dallas Chamber Symphony commissioned an original film score for Sunrise from composer Joe Kraemer. The score premiered on October 18, 2016, at Moody Performance Hall with Richard McKay conducting. Selections from the score were recorded and released on Caldera Records.

Sunrise won the Academy Award for Unique and Artistic Picture at the 1st Academy Awards in 1929. Janet Gaynor won the first Academy Award for Best Actress in a Leading Role for her performance in the film (the award was also for her performances in 1927's 7th Heaven and 1928's Street Angel). The film's legacy has endured, and it is now widely considered a masterpiece and one of the greatest films ever made. Many have called it the greatest film of the silent era. In 1989, Sunrise was one of the first 25 films selected by the U.S. Library of Congress for preservation in the National Film Registry for being "culturally, historically, or aesthetically significant". The Academy Film Archive preserved Sunrise in 2004. The 2007 update of the American Film Institute's list of the 100 greatest American films ranked it number 82, and the British Film Institute's 2022 Sight & Sound critics’ poll named it the eleventh-best film in the history of motion pictures, while the directors’ poll listed it 33rd.

Although the original 35mm negative of the original American version of Sunrise was destroyed in the 1937 Fox vault fire, a new negative was created from a surviving print.

== Plot ==
Full film with synchronized sound: Sunrise: A Song of Two Humans (1927)

A vacationing woman from the city lingers in a lakeside town for weeks. After dark, she goes to a farmhouse where the Man and the Wife live with their child. She whistles from the fence outside. The Man is torn, but finally departs, leaving his wife with the memories of better times when they were deeply in love.

The man and woman meet in the moonlight and kiss passionately. She wants him to sell his farm—which has not done well recently—to join her in the city. When she suggests that he solve the problem of his wife by drowning her, he throttles her violently, but even that dissolves in a passionate embrace. The Woman gathers bundles of reeds and indicates that when the boat is overturned the Man can use it to stay afloat.

The Wife suspects nothing when her husband suggests going on an outing, but when they set off across the lake, she soon grows suspicious. He prepares to throw her overboard, but when she pleads for his mercy, he realizes he cannot do it. He rows frantically for shore, and when the boat reaches land, the Wife flees to escape.

She boards a trolley, and he follows, begging her not to be afraid of him. The trolley brings them to the city. Her fear and disappointment are overwhelming. He plies her with flowers and bread and finally she stops crying and accepts his gifts. Emerging back on the street, they are touched to see a bride enter a church for her processional, and follow her inside to watch the wedding. The Man breaks down and asks her to forgive him. After a tearful reconciliation, they continue their adventure in the city, having their photograph taken together and visiting a funfair. As darkness falls, they board the trolley for home.

Soon they are drifting back across the lake under the moonlight. A sudden storm causes their boat to begin sinking. The Man remembers the two bundles of reeds he placed in the boat earlier and ties the bundles around the Wife. The boat capsizes, and the Man awakes on a rocky shore. He gathers the townspeople to search the lake, but all they find is a broken bundle of reeds floating in the water.

Convinced the Wife has drowned, the grief-stricken Man stumbles home. The Woman from the City goes to his house, assuming their plan has succeeded. The Man begins to choke her. Then the Maid calls to him that his wife is alive, so he releases the Woman and runs to the Wife, who survived by clinging to one last bundle of reeds.

The Man kneels by the Wife's bed as she slowly opens her eyes. The Man and the Wife kiss, while the Woman from the city's carriage rolls down the hill toward the lake, and the film dissolves to the sunrise.

== Cast ==
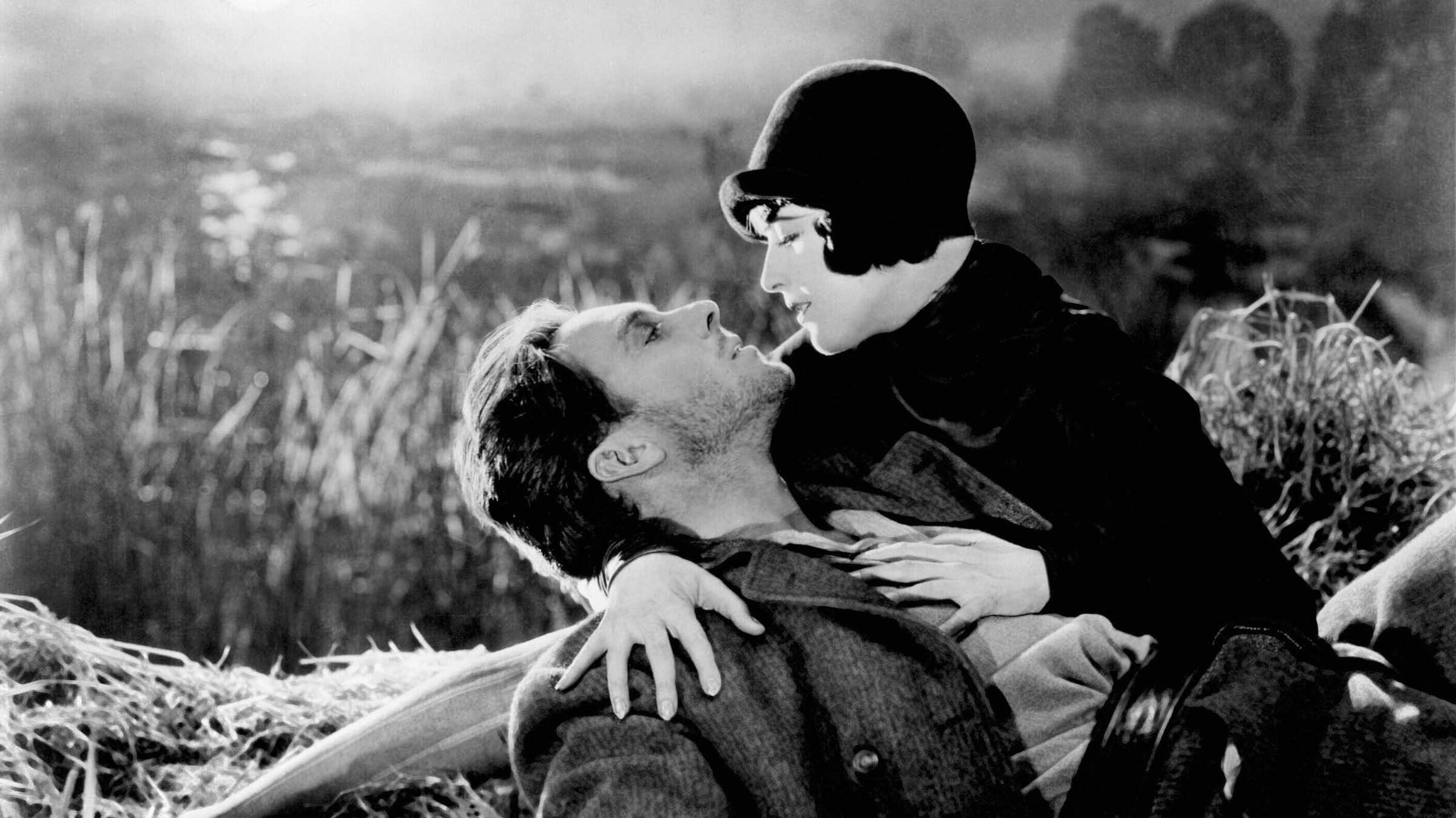
George O'Brien and Margaret Livingston in a publicity still for the film.

- George O'Brien as The Man
- Janet Gaynor as The Wife
- Margaret Livingston as The Woman From the City
- Bodil Rosing as The Maid
- J. Farrell MacDonald as The Photographer
- Ralph Sipperly as The Barber
- Jane Winton as The Manicure Girl
- Arthur Housman as The Obtrusive Gentleman
- Eddie Boland as The Obliging Gentleman
- Sally Eilers as Woman in Dance Hall with failing straps (uncredited)
- Gino Corrado as Manager of Hair Salon (uncredited)
- Herman Bing as Streetcar Conductor (uncredited)
- Gibson Gowland as Angry Driver (uncredited)

== Style ==
Sunrise: A Song of Two Humans trailer

Sunrise was made by F. W. Murnau, a German director who was one of the leading figures in German Expressionism, a style that uses distorted art design for symbolic effect. Murnau was invited by William Fox to make an Expressionist film in Hollywood.

The resulting film features enormous stylized sets that create an exaggerated and fairy-tale world; the city street set alone reportedly cost over US$200,000 to build and was re-used in many subsequent Fox productions, including John Ford's Four Sons (1928). Much of the exterior shooting was done at Lake Arrowhead, California.

Full of cinematic innovations, the groundbreaking cinematography (by Charles Rosher and Karl Struss) features particularly praised tracking shots. Titles appear sparingly, with long sequences of pure action and the bulk of the story told in Murnau's signature style. The extensive use of forced perspective is striking, particularly in a shot of the city with normal-sized people and sets in the foreground and smaller figures in the background by much smaller sets.

The characters go unnamed, lending them a universality conducive to symbolism. Veit Harlan compared his German remake Die Reise nach Tilsit (1939); pointing to the symbolism and soft focus of the original, he claimed that Sunrise was a poem, whereas his realistic Die Reise nach Tilsit was a film.

== Release ==
Sunrise premiered on September 23, 1927. It was accompanied by the first ever talking newsreels, which attracted much of the initial interest in the film.

== Reception and legacy ==
The film received positive reviews from critics. On Rotten Tomatoes, the review aggregator holds an approval rating of 'fresh' 98%, based on 65 reviews. The site's consensus reads, "Boasting masterful cinematography to match its well-acted, wonderfully romantic storyline, Sunrise is perhaps the final—and arguably definitive—statement of the silent era." Metacritic, which uses a weighted average, assigned the film a score of 95 out of 100, based on 19 critics, indicating "universal acclaim".

Mordaunt Hall of The New York Times hailed Sunrise as "A Film Masterpiece". A reviewer for Time, however, called its story "meagre" while writing that the film overall "manages to remain picturesquely soporific for a long evening". Sunrise: A Song of Two Humans is now widely considered by film critics and historians to be one of the greatest films ever made.

The February 2020 issue of New York magazine lists Sunrise as among "The Best Movies That Lost Best Picture at the Oscars".

== Accolades ==
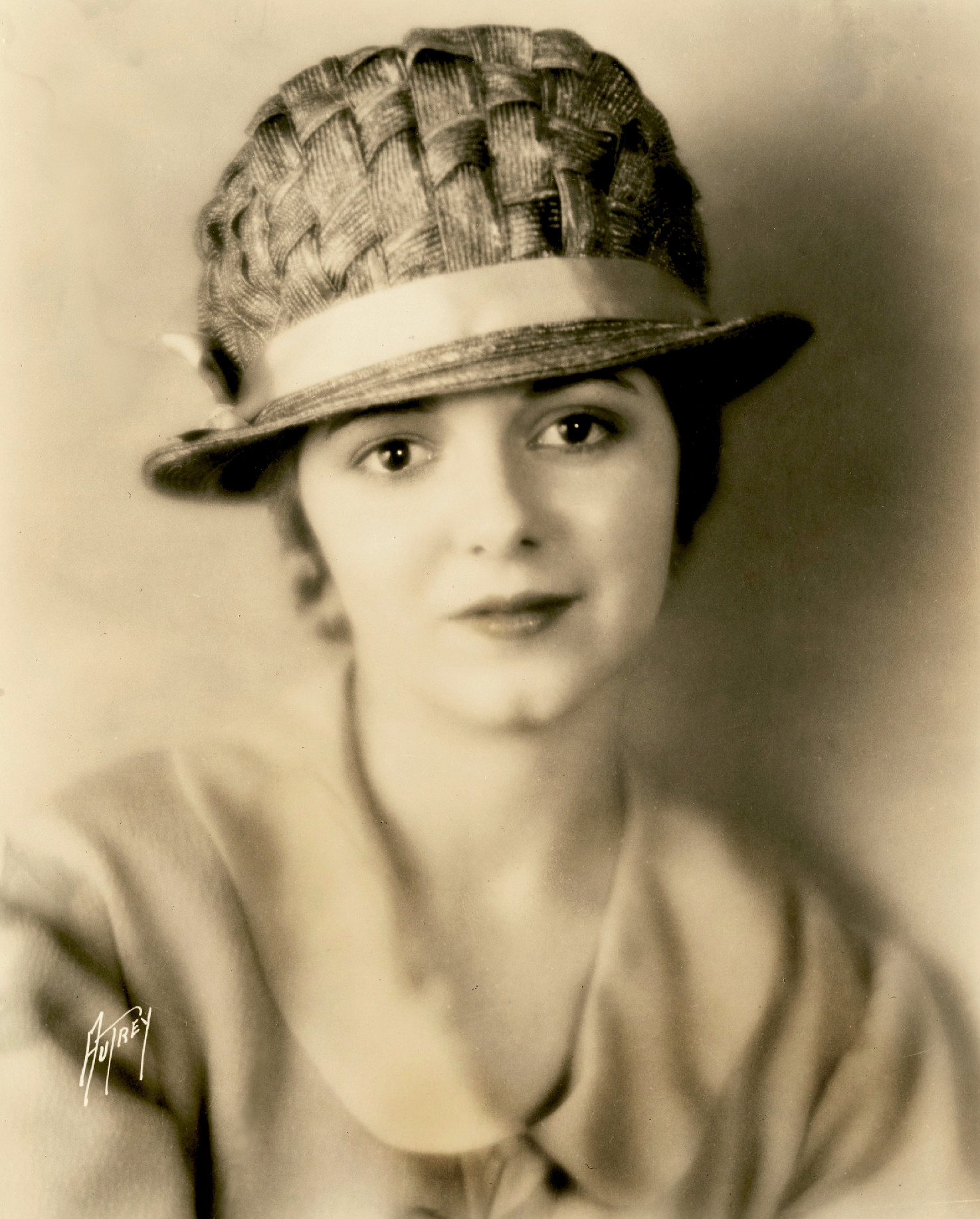
Janet Gaynor, winner of first Academy Award for Best Actress

Academy Award wins (1929)

- Best Unique and Artistic Picture (This Oscar, only awarded at the 1st Academy Awards, was at the time as prestigious as Outstanding Picture, but the Academy has since decided that the higher honor went to Wings in the latter category.)
- Best Actress in a Leading Role – Janet Gaynor (At this time acting awards were given for an actor's entire body of work in a year, so the award was for her work on this film, 7th Heaven, and Street Angel)
- Best Cinematography – Charles Rosher and Karl Struss

Academy Award nominations (1929)

- Best Art Direction – Rochus Gliese

Other distinctions

- 1989: Inclusion into the National Film Registry
- 2002, 2012: Ranked in the top 10 of the decennial Sight & Sound critics' poll
- AFI's 100 Years...100 Passions: No. 63
- AFI's 100 Years...100 Heroes and Villains: The Woman from the City (Nominated Villain)
- AFI's 100 Years...100 Movies (10th Anniversary Edition): No. 82

== Home media ==
20th Century Fox originally released Sunrise on DVD in Region 1, but only as a special limited edition available only by mailing in proofs-of-purchase for other DVD titles in their "20th Century Fox Studio Classics" line, or as part of the box set Studio Classics: The 'Best Picture' Collection. The DVD includes commentary, a copy of the film's trailer, details about Murnau's lost film 4 Devils, outtakes, and many more features.

In late 2008, Fox released the "Murnau, Borzage and Fox Box Set" in some markets. Both Movietone and European silent versions of Sunrise are included. A documentary of the three individuals is also part of the collection.

Sunrise has also been released on DVD in the UK as part of the Masters of Cinema series. In September 2009, Masters of Cinema released a 2-disc DVD reissue, containing both the Movietone version and the shorter Czech print found on the 2008 "Murnau, Borzage and Fox" DVD, as well as the extra features found on the previous Masters of Cinema DVD release and the Fox Studio Classics release. The film was released simultaneously on Blu-ray Disc, with both versions of the feature rendered in 1080p High-definition video, and both the stereo and the mono soundtracks rendered in Dolby TrueHD lossless audio. This UK release was the first occasion of a silent film being released on Blu-ray. The Blu-ray disk is apparently not region-encoded, and thus should be viewable on any Blu-ray disk player and PS5.

In January 2014, the film was released in the US on a Blu-ray/DVD combo pack by 20th Century Fox.

The film's copyright was renewed in 1954. Sunrise entered the public domain on January 1, 2023.

== See also ==
- List of early sound feature films (1926–1929)
