= Street Angel (1928 film) =

1928 film by Frank Borzage

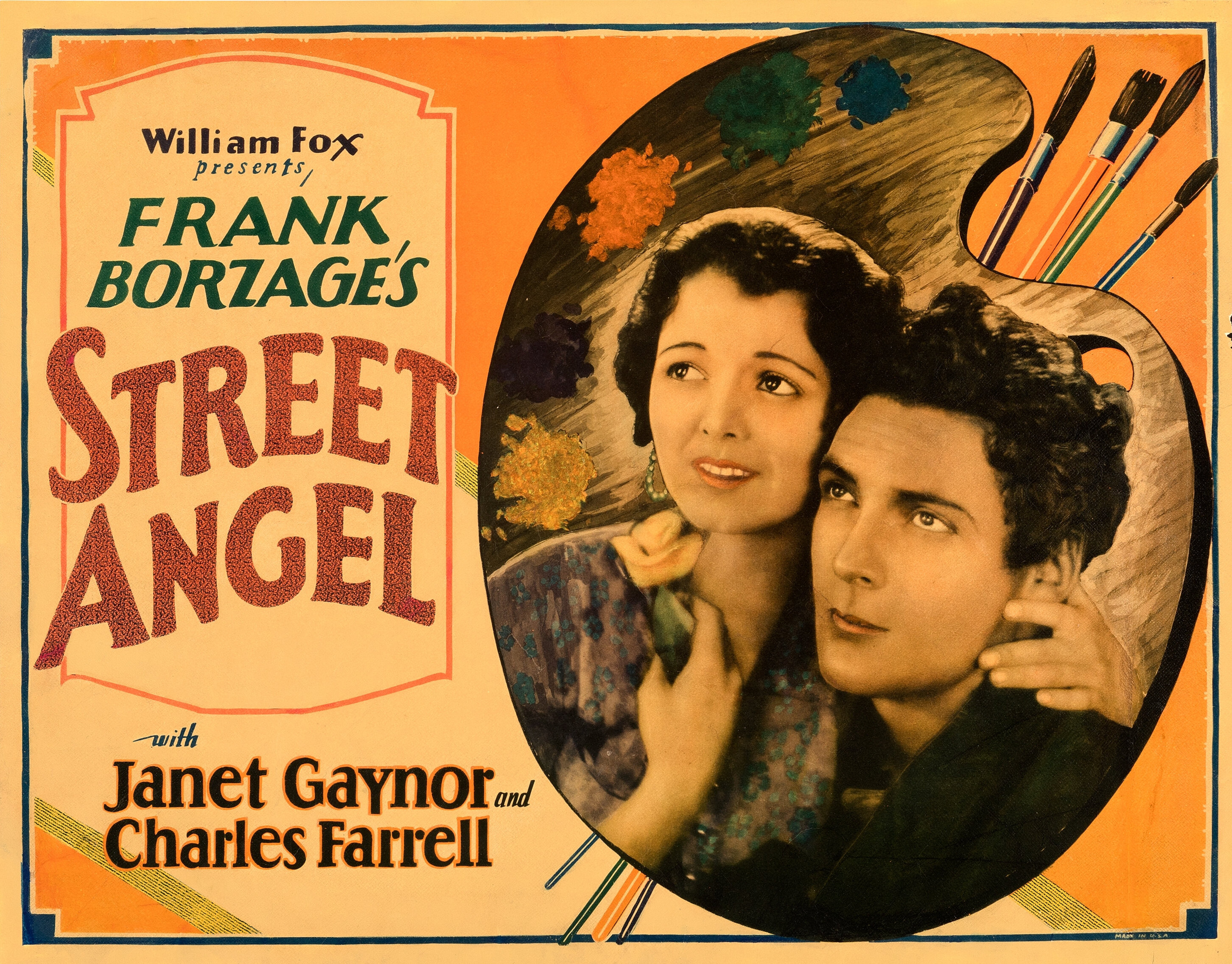
- Theatrical release poster
- Directed by: Frank Borzage
- Written by: Philip Klein; Henry Roberts Symonds
- Based on: Lady Cristilinda by Monckton Hoffe
- Produced by: William Fox
- Starring: Janet Gaynor; Charles Farrell; Alberto Rabagliati
- Cinematography: Paul Ivano; Ernest Palmer
- Distributed by: Fox Film Corporation
- Release date: April 9, 1928
- Running time: 102 minutes
- Country: United States
- Languages: Sound (Synchronized); English Intertitles
- Box office: $1.7 million

Street Angel is a 1928 American synchronized sound drama film. Although the film contains no audible dialogue, it was released with a synchronized musical score and sound effects using the sound-on-film movietone process. Directed by Frank Borzage, the film was adapted by Harry H. Caldwell (titles), Katherine Hilliker (titles), Philip Klein, Marion Orth, and Henry Roberts Symonds from the play Lady Cristilinda by Monckton Hoffe. As an early, transitional sound film, it used intertitles, recorded sound effects and musical selections, but did not include recorded dialogue.

Street Angel was one of three films for which Janet Gaynor received the first Academy Award for Best Actress in 1929; the others were F. W. Murnau's Sunrise: A Song of Two Humans and Borzage's 7th Heaven. The film was used for inaugural opening of the Fox Theatre in Brooklyn on August 31, 1928.

The movie received two further Academy Award nominations at the 1930 ceremony for Best Art Direction and Best Cinematography, making it one of two English-language films to receive Oscar nominations in separate years. The other was The Quiet One, nominated in 1949 for Documentary Feature and in 1950 for Story and Screenplay.

Street Angel entered the public domain in the United States in 2024.

== Plot ==
The film begins in the dark, narrow streets of Naples, a city of archways, weathered stone steps, laundry hanging overhead, and patches of mist that soften the lamplight. The police — carabineers — make their rounds in pairs, their boots echoing on the cobblestones. Frank Borzage's direction leans into the oppressive beauty: slender iron railings, crumbling arches, and the occasional sudden shaft of sunlight cutting through shadow.

In a cramped, dimly lit home, Angela (Janet Gaynor) tends to her ailing mother, who is gravely ill. Angela has no money for medicine. She is desperate. Hearing the doctor say a prescription will cost twenty lire, she leaves the house determined to get the money by any means.

Angela, still young and naïve, imitates the behavior of a streetwalker she has seen. She approaches men in the street, awkwardly trying to make herself seem available. But the men — some amused, some annoyed — laugh her off. She is too innocent, too obviously playing a part.

Finally, in a small spaghetti café, Angela sees a customer's coins left on the counter. In a moment of panic and desperation, she tries to snatch the change — but is caught in the act by the shopkeeper and the police sergeant, Neri (Guido Trento). She is arrested on the charge of attempted theft while soliciting.

In the court, Angela is sentenced to one year in the workhouse. As she is being escorted there by two carabineers, she spots a chance for escape — slipping away in the confusion of the marketplace. She disappears into the winding alleys and escapes Naples entirely.

Angela finds refuge with a small caravan circus, run by Mascetto (Henry Armetta), a jovial but gruff ringmaster who barks orders at his troupe while fussing over his animals. Mascetto hires Angela to perform as a stilt-walker and in small sideshow acts. The circus is poor but colorful: a strongman who lifts women overhead, a fortune teller, children chasing after the wagons.

It is here that Angela meets Gino (Charles Farrell), a struggling painter who has joined the circus to make money painting banners and signs. Gino is instantly struck by Angela's delicate beauty and spirit. He watches her shyly, sketching her in idle moments.

Over time, Gino and Angela fall in love. Gino paints Angela's portrait as a Madonna — serene, pure, radiant. He rents a modest studio, telling Angela he will one day do great work for the churches of Naples. They have separate rooms but share a deep romantic bond, often communicating through playful whistles — a motif of the Neapolitan song “O Sole Mio.”

During a circus performance, Angela, on stilts, suddenly spots two uniformed carabineers in the crowd. The sight of them brings back her past like a ghost. She loses her balance and falls heavily, breaking her ankle. Gino takes her back to Naples to get proper medical care from a good doctor.

Angela recovers slowly, but Gino is broke. He cannot sell his paintings, no matter how hard he tries. Desperate for money, he reluctantly sells his Madonna portrait of Angela to an elderly dealer. Unknown to Gino, the buyer plans to fake the painting as an “old master” for profit.

While Angela is out buying food with the little money they have, she is recognized by the same Carabineer who arrested her a year before. He follows her back to the studio and knocks at the door. When Angela answers, he places her under arrest to serve her original sentence. She pleads for one hour to say goodbye to Gino without revealing the truth to him. She tells the officer that the shock of knowing she is going to prison would kill Gino. The officer relents.

Angela returns to Gino, who has just come in carrying a basket of food and wine, thrilled with a small advance payment he has received for a mural job. They share a bittersweet hour together. Gino believes her tears are tears of joy. At one point, he whistles “O Sole Mio,” and Angela, trembling, struggles to whistle back without breaking down.

When the hour is up, Angela slips away quietly. Gino awakes the next morning to find her gone, with no explanation.

Angela serves her full term in the workhouse. Upon her release, she tries to find Gino, but he is nowhere to be seen. At the docks, she wanders among the crowd. She learns from another ex-prisoner that Gino had been searching for her and had been told she was no better than a common streetwalker.

Gino, meanwhile, is seeking a model for a new painting — “a woman with the face of an angel and the soul of a devil.” He spots Angela in the crowd. His eyes blaze with fury and betrayal. She, terrified, flees into a nearby church, seeking sanctuary.

Inside the church, Gino catches up to Angela and is about to choke her in anger — but then he sees his own Madonna painting of her, now hanging above the altar. The sight stops him cold.

Angela, through tears, convinces him she is still the woman he painted, that her soul has not changed. Gino's anger melts. They embrace beneath the gaze of the painted Madonna.

The lovers, reunited, leave the church together. The mist and shadows of Naples close in, but now they walk with renewed hope.

== Cast ==
- Janet Gaynor as Angela
- Charles Farrell as Gino
- Natalie Kingston as Lisetta
- Henry Armetta as Mascetto
- Guido Trento as Neri, Sergeant of Police
- Alberto Rabagliati as A Policeman
- Demetrius Alexis as Museum Waiter (uncredited)
- Jennie Bruno as Landlady (uncredited)
- Gino Conti as Policeman (uncredited)
- Milton Dickinson as Bimbo (uncredited)
- Helena Herman as Andrea (uncredited)
- Dave Kashner as The Strong Man (uncredited)
- Louis Liggett as Beppo (uncredited)
- Hector Sarno as Spaghetti Cook (uncredited)

== Music ==
Full film with synchronized sound

The film featured a theme song entitled "Angela Mia (My Angel)," composed by Ernö Rapée and Lew Pollack.

== Censorship ==
Street Angel, which at its start is set in Naples, caused a riot when shown there in 1928. As a result, Benito Mussolini replaced the film censors that had passed the film and banned further showing of it in Italy. At the request of the Italian government in 1929, the French government banned the showing of Street Angel throughout Morocco.

== Home video release ==
The film was believed to be lost for many years, but it is now part of a collection of 12 films by Fox that was released in 2008.

== See also ==
- List of early sound feature films (1926–1929)
