= 7th Heaven (1927 film) =

1927 film by Frank Borzage

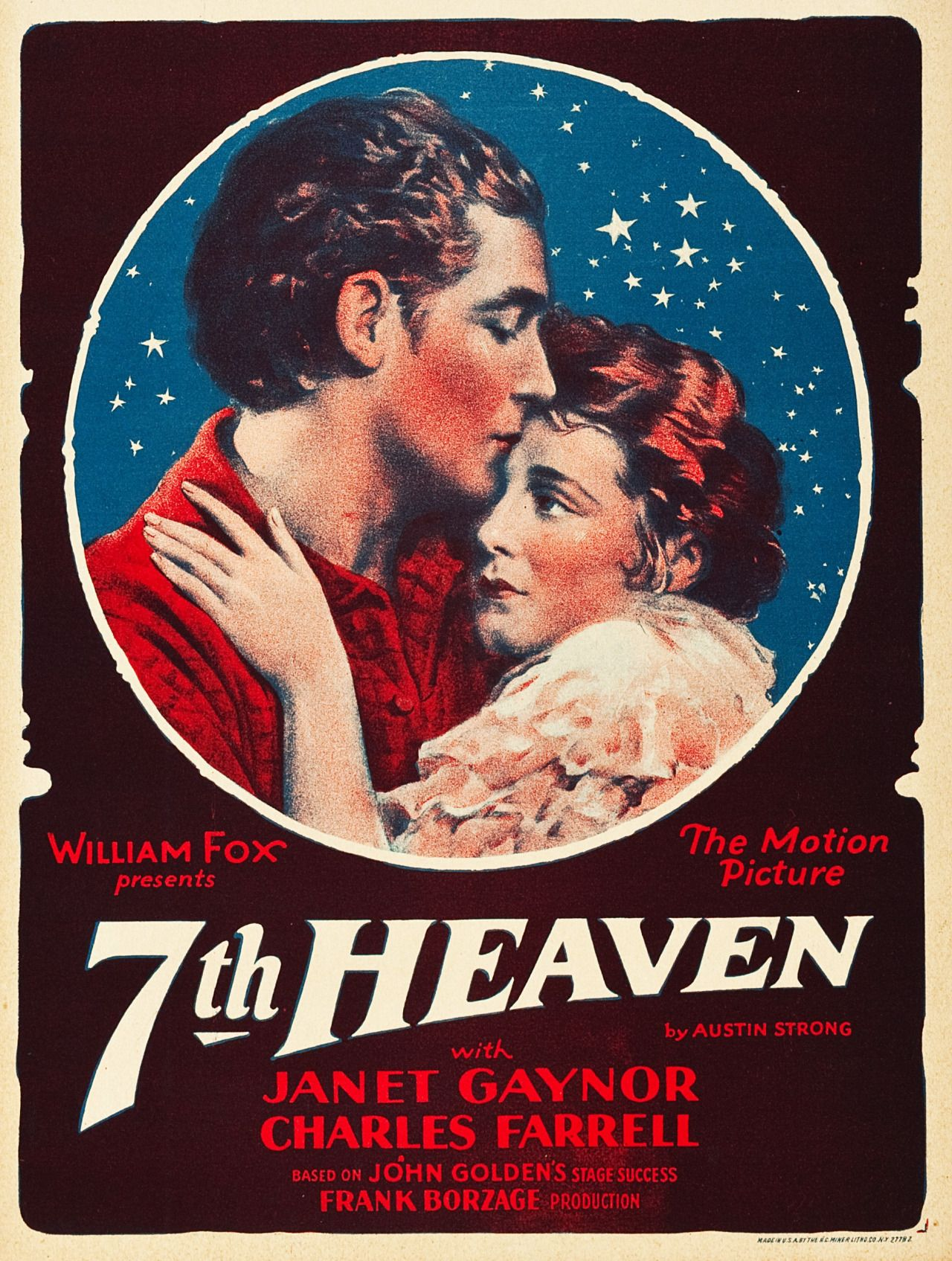
- Theatrical release poster
- Directed by: Frank Borzage
- Written by: Harry H. Caldwell (titles); Katharine Hilliker (titles); Bernard Vorhaus (uncredited)
- Screenplay by: Benjamin Glazer
- Based on: Seventh Heaven by Austin Strong
- Produced by: William Fox
- Starring: Janet Gaynor; Charles Farrell; Ben Bard
- Cinematography: Ernest Palmer; Joseph A. Valentine
- Edited by: Barney Wolf
- Distributed by: Fox Film Corporation
- Release dates: May 6, 1927 (Los Angeles); May 25, 1927 (New York City); September 10, 1927 (New York City (re-release))
- Running time: 110 minutes
- Country: United States
- Language: Sound (Synchronized) (English intertitles)
- Budget: $1.3 million
- Box office: $2.5 million

7th Heaven (also known as Seventh Heaven) is a 1927 American synchronized sound romantic drama directed by Frank Borzage, and starring Janet Gaynor and Charles Farrell. While the film has no audible dialogue, it was released with a synchronized musical score with sound effects using the Movietone sound system. The film is based upon the 1922 play Seventh Heaven, by Austin Strong and was adapted for the screen by Benjamin Glazer. 7th Heaven was initially released as a standard silent film in May 1927. On September 10, 1927, Fox Film Corporation re-released the film with a synchronized Movietone soundtrack with a musical score and sound effects.

Upon its release, 7th Heaven was a critical and commercial success and helped to establish Fox Film Corporation as a major studio. It was among the first three films to be nominated for the Academy Award for Best Picture (then called "Outstanding Picture") at the 1st Academy Awards held on May 16, 1929. Janet Gaynor won the first Academy Award for Best Actress for her performance in the film (she also won for her performances in 1927's Sunrise: A Song of Two Humans and 1928's Street Angel). Director Frank Borzage also won the first Academy Award for Best Director while screenwriter Benjamin Glazer won the first Academy Award for Best Writing (Adapted Screenplay).

In 1995, 7th Heaven was selected for preservation in the United States National Film Registry by the Library of Congress as being "culturally, historically, or aesthetically significant". The film entered the public domain in the United States in 2023.

== Plot ==
7th Heaven full film

In the early 1910s, Chico works in the sewers of Paris. He expresses his desire to be a street sweeper, to work above ground, and light candles at a nearby church. After a meeting with the church's priest, Chico receives the recommendation he needs for the street-sweeping job.

Diane is a young prostitute living with her abusive sister, Nana. When news arrives that their uncle and aunt have returned with a fortune, Nana particularly hopes they will provide more comfortable accommodations. But when the uncle asks Diane directly whether she and her sister have kept "clean and decent", the look on her face confirms his worst suspicions and, refusing to take them home, disowns them. Nana, furious at Diane for revealing the truth, begins to beat her. As Diane tries to escape on the street, Chico steps in to rescue her.

Following a brief flirtation between Diane and Chico, Nana returns with the police, intending to arrest Diane. Once again, Chico intervenes, asserting that Diane is not a prostitute but his wife. Despite initial skepticism, the police refrain from arresting Diane but ask for Chico's address to verify the marriage. Concerned about potential repercussions for lying, Chico fears losing his job as a streetsweeper. To provide an alibi, he suggests Diane move in with him. After ensuring she's not being exploited, Diane agrees to Chico's proposal.

Soon afterwards, the police visit Chico's apartment for further investigation, and their strategy succeeds, absolving them both of suspicion. With no more reason to stay, Diane prepares to leave, feeling disheartened after having grown fond of Chico and his airy sixth-floor walkup flat. When Chico offers her to stay, she joyfully accepts, feeling that Chico is a godsend. As they spend more time together, they quickly fall in love and decide to marry genuinely.

News of World War I reaching France arrives, prompting the couple to hold an unofficial wedding in their apartment, with God as their sole witness. Chico is swiftly recruited, forcing him to depart for the battlefield. Upon his departure, a resentful Nana returns, deriding Diane for her marriage and attempting to assault her once more, only to be forced out by Diane fighting back with newfound bravery thanks to Chico's support.

While Chico fights in the war, Diane finds work at a munitions factory. During a battle, Chico is gravely wounded and believes he's dying. When Diane is told that Chico has been officially declared dead, she is devastated. Yet once the war ends, Chico returns home, his death having been wrongly reported, but he is now blind.

== Cast ==
- Janet Gaynor as Diane
- Charles Farrell as Chico
- Ben Bard as Col. Brissac
- Albert Gran as Boul
- David Butler as Gobin
- Marie Mosquini as Madame Gobin
- Gladys Brockwell as Nana
- Emile Chautard as Father Chevillon
- Jessie Haslett as Aunt Valentine
- Brandon Hurst as Uncle George
- George E. Stone as Sewer Rat
- Lillian West as Arlette
- Henry Armetta as Extra (uncredited)
- Lewis Borzage Sr. as Streetlamp Lighter (uncredited)
- Dolly Borzage as Street Girl (uncredited)
- Mary Borzage as Bullet Factory Worker (uncredited)
- Sue Borzage as Street Girl (uncredited)
- Italia Frandi as Extra (uncredited)
- Venezia Frandi as Extra (uncredited)
- Frankie Genardi as Little Boy (uncredited)
- Lois Hardwick as Extra (uncredited)

== Music ==
The film featured a theme song entitled "Diane" which was composed by Ernö Rapée and Lew Pollack.

== Production notes ==
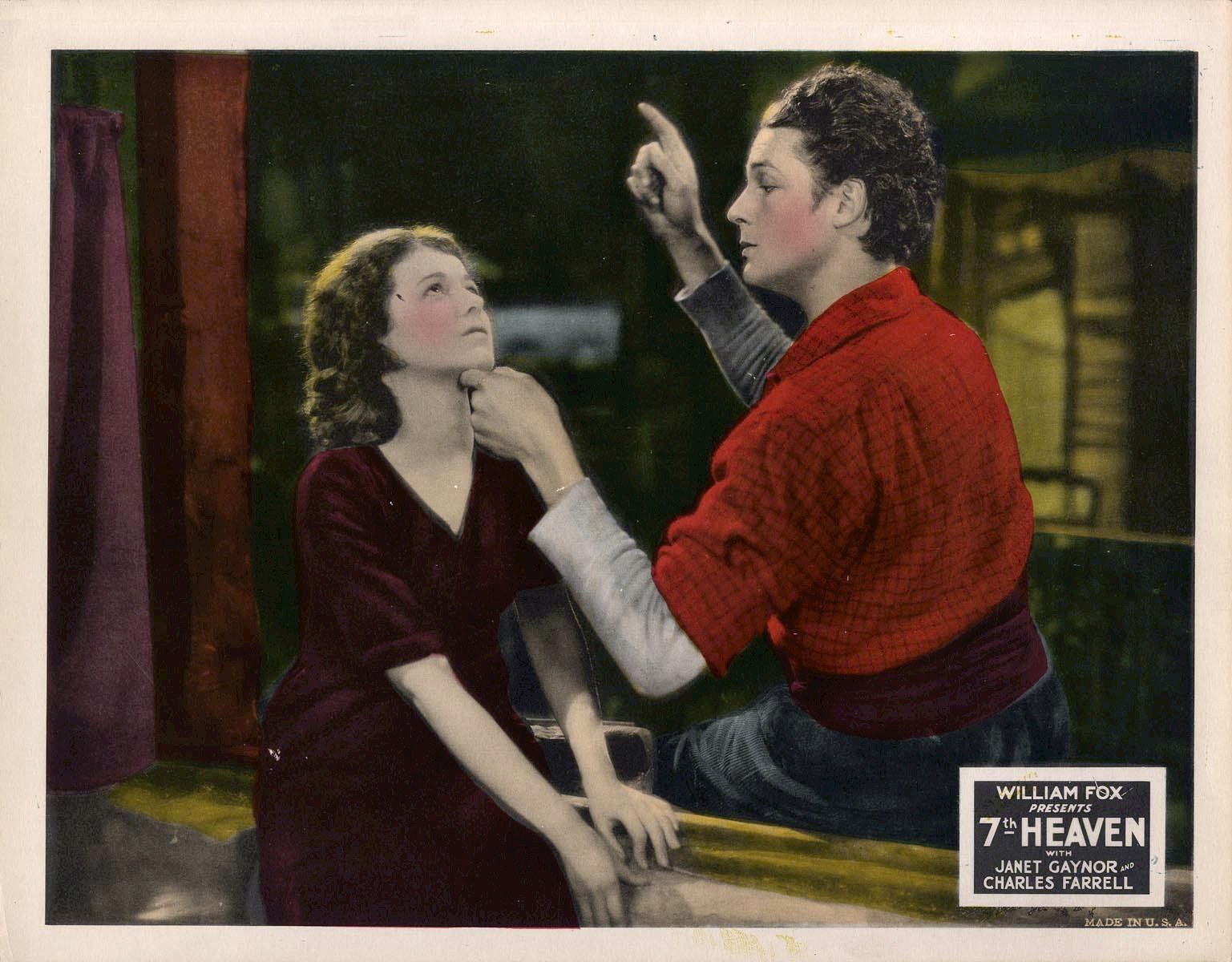
Lobby card with Janet Gaynor and Charles Farrell

The Broadway play upon which the film is based starred George Gaul and Helen Menken and ran at the Booth Theatre for 704 performances.

When the play was adapted for the screen, Janet Gaynor and Charles Farrell were cast in the lead roles. The pairing proved to be so popular, the two went on to star in 11 more films together and were dubbed "America's Favorite Lovebirds".

7th Heaven features the song "Diane" by Ernö Rapée and Lew Pollack, who wrote the song specifically for the film. The song is included on the re-released version of the film.

== Reception ==
7th Heaven initially premiered at the Carthay Circle Theatre in Los Angeles replacing another Fox melodrama What Price Glory?, which had been playing since November 1926. A second opening was held at the Sam H. Harris Theatre in New York City on May 25. Both openings earned a total of $14,500. A series of Movietone shorts featuring Ben Bernie and his Orchestra, Gertrude Lawrence, Raquel Meller, and Charles "Chic" Sale preceded the film.

Upon its release, 7th Heaven was a critical and commercial success. The New York Times critic stated that the film "grips your interest from the very beginning and even though the end is melodramatic, you are glad that the sympathetic but self-satisfied Chico is brought back to his heartbroken Diane." The critic also praised Borzage's direction, stating that the director "has given it all that he could put through the medium of the camera." The film ran for 19 weeks in New York City and for 22 weeks in Los Angeles.

Due to the film's success and the success of other Fox films featuring sound elements (Sunrise, What Price Glory?), the studio re-released 7th Heaven with a synchronized Movietone soundtrack, including a musical score arranged by Ernö Rapée and sound effects. The re-release version premiered at New York City's Roxy Theatre on September 10, 1927.

By 1932, 7th Heaven had become the 13th-highest-grossing American silent, earning more than $2.5 million at the box office.

== Awards and honors ==
Year	Award	Category	Recipient	Result
1927	Academy Awards	Outstanding Picture	Fox Film	Nominated
1927	Academy Awards	Best Director	Frank Borzage	Won
1927	Academy Awards	Best Actress	Janet Gaynor	Won
1927	Academy Awards	Best Writing (Adapted Screenplay)	Benjamin Glazer	Won
1927	Academy Awards	Best Art Direction	Harry Oliver	Nominated
1928	Kinema Junpo Awards	Best Foreign Film	Frank Borzage	Won
1927	Photoplay Awards	Medal of Honor	William Fox	Won

== Remakes and adaptations ==
A comparatively unknown 1937 remake of the film was produced as a sound feature starring Simone Simon, James Stewart, Jean Hersholt, and Gregory Ratoff, with Henry King directing. Unlike the 1927 version, the sound remake was not as financially successful.

7th Heaven was adapted for the Lux Radio Theatre four times: October 14, 1934, with Miriam Hopkins and John Boles (the show's premiere episode); October 17, 1938, with Jean Arthur and Don Ameche; October 16, 1944, with Jennifer Jones and Van Johnson (on the show's tenth-year anniversary); and finally on March 26, 1951, with Janet Gaynor and Charles Farrell, recreating their original roles.

A television adaptation was aired on October 26, 1953, on the anthology series Broadway Television Theatre. The episode stars Hurd Hatfield and Geraldine Brooks and was directed by Robert St. Aubrey.

On May 26, 1955, a stage musical version of the film opened at the ANTA Theatre starring Gloria DeHaven and Ricardo Montalbán. It closed on July 2, 1955, after 44 performances.

== Home media ==
On December 9, 2008, 7th Heaven was included in the Murnau, Borzage and Fox DVD box set released by 20th Century Fox Home Entertainment.

== In popular culture ==
Chinese writer-director Yuan Muzhi's 1937 film Street Angel has been cited as being influenced by elements of 7th Heaven and another Frank Borzage film Street Angel (1928).

The theatrical poster for 7th Heaven is displayed on the wall of the student Watanabe's lodgings in the oldest surviving film by the Japanese director Yasujirō Ozu, Days of Youth: A Student Romance (Gakusei Romansu: Wakaki Hi, 1929).

Filmmaker Damien Chazelle has said the ending of his 2016 musical La La Land was inspired by the ending of 7th Heaven.

== See also ==
- List of early sound feature films (1926–1929)

== Sources ==
- Bradley, Edwin M. (2004). The First Hollywood Musicals: A Critical Filmography of 171 Features, 1927 through 1932. Jefferson, NC: McFarland. ISBN 978-0-7864-2029-2.
- Clark, Peter, ed. (2013). The Oxford Handbook of Cities in World History. Oxford: Oxford University Press. ISBN 978-0-19-958953-1.
- Crafton, Donald (1999). The Talkies: American Cinema's Transition to Sound, 1926–1931. New York: University of California Press. ISBN 978-0-520-22128-4.
- Dietz, Dan (2014). The Complete Book of 1950s Broadway Musicals. Lanham, MD: Rowman & Littlefiel. ISBN 978-1-4422-3505-2.
- Dumont, Hervé (2006). Frank Borzage: The Life and Films of a Hollywood Romantic. Jefferson, NC: McFarland. ISBN 978-0-7864-2187-9.
- Dyer MacCann, Richard, ed. (1996). Films of the 1920s. Lanham, MD: Scarecrow Press. ISBN 978-0-8108-3256-5.
- Eyman, Scott (1997). The Speed of Sound: Hollywood and the Talkie Revolution 1926–1930. New York: Simon and Schuster. ISBN 978-1-4391-0428-6.
- Goble, Alan (1999). The Complete Index to Literary Sources in Film. Berlin: Walter de Gruyter. ISBN 978-3-11-095194-3.
- Hischak, Thomas S. (2008). The Oxford Companion to the American Musical: Theatre, Film, and Television. Oxford: Oxford University Press. ISBN 978-0-19-533533-0.
- Holston, Kim R. (2012). Movie Roadshows: A History and Filmography of Reserved-Seat Limited Showings, 1911–1973. Jefferson, NC: McFarland. ISBN 978-0-7864-9261-9.
- Melnick, Ross (2014). American Showman: Samuel "Roxy" Rothafel and the Birth of the Entertainment Industry, 1908–1935. New York: Columbia University Press. ISBN 978-0-231-15905-0.
- Morefield, Kenneth R.; Olson, Nicholas S., eds. (2015). Faith and Spirituality in Masters of World Cinema, Volume III. Newcastle upon Tyne: Cambridge Scholars Publishing. ISBN 978-1-4438-7498-4.
- Soloman, Aubrey (2011). The Fox Film Corporation, 1915–1935: A History and Filmography. Jefferson, NC: McFarland. ISBN 978-0-7864-8610-6.
