= The Right of the Strongest =

The Right of the Strongest may refer to:

- The Right of the Strongest (novel), 1913 novel by Frances Nimmo Greene
- The Right of the Strongest (film), 1924 American silent film based on the novel
