= Katherine Hilliker =

American screenwriter

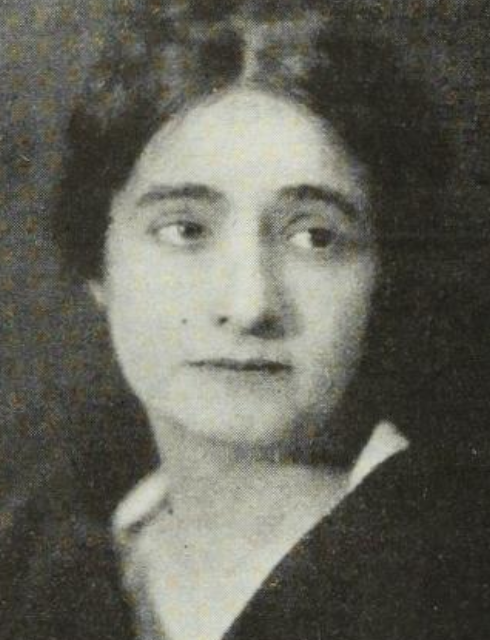
- Katherine Hilliker, from a 1920 publication
- Born: Katharine Clark; April 25, 1885; Tacoma, Washington, USA
- Died: December 6, 1965 (aged 80); Virginia Beach, Virginia, USA
- Other name: Kitty Prosser
- Occupations: title writer and title editor
- Spouse(s): Bill Hilliker; Harry H. Caldwell

Katherine Hilliker (born Katharine Clark, and sometimes referred to as Kitty Prosser) was an American title writer and title editor known for her work on films like Sunrise: A Song of Two Humans. She was married to fellow title writer and title editor Harry H. Caldwell, with whom she often collaborated.

== Biography ==
Katharine Clark was born in Tacoma, Washington. Her father died when she was young, and she was raised by her stepfather (hence her sometimes being referred to as Katherine Prosser). She attended high school in Savannah, Georgia, before moving to San Francisco to begin a career as a journalist. While working at The Oakland Call, she met her first husband, Douglas "Bill" Hilliker.

Hilliker was a graphic designer who was working in the fledgling motion picture industry, and after the pair married, she took an interest in the medium as well. She went to work as film critic at The New York Morning Telegraph before leaving journalism behind to work as an editor at Universal. She then moved on to work as David O. Selznick publicity chief Vivian Moses's assistant, writing publicity copy on the studio's releases.

By 1916, she was writing and editing films at Select; she later worked at C.L. Chester Pictures Corporation, where she helped put together documentary-style travel shorts. While working at Chester, she met the man who would become her second husband, H.H. Caldwell. She and Clark would work on English titles for foreign releases at Samuel Goldwyn's studio. They later worked on titles at Fox (most notably on Sunrise), though their career in Hollywood came to an end with the advent of talkies.

== Selected filmography ==
As title writer:

- City Girl (1930)
- Christina (1929)
- Black Magic (1929)
- Eternal Love (1929)
- The Rescue (1929)
- The Awakening (1928)
- No Other Woman (1928)
- Four Sons (1928)
- The Gateway of the Moon (1928)
- Mother Machree (1927)
- Sunrise (1927)
- The Loves of Carmen (1927)
- 7th Heaven (1927)
- The Country Beyond (1926)
- The Boob (1926)
- The Devil's Circus (1926)
- Torrent (1926)
- Ben-Hur (1925)
- The Masked Bride (1925)
- The Prairie Wife (1925)
- Welcome Stranger (1924)
- The Right of the Strongest (1924)
- Lost and Found on a South Sea Island (1923)
- The Cave Girl (1921)
- Love's Penalty (1921)
- What Women Love (1920)
- Some More Samoa (1920)
- The Skipper's Narrow Escape (1920). Dir.: Ira M. Lowry, st.: Fontaine Fox, ttl.: Katharine Hilliker (Betzwood Film Company US 1920), cas.: Dan Mason, Wilna Wilde, si, b&w.
- Cynthia of the Minute (1920)
- Some Speed to Surago (1920)
- Cameraing Through Africa (1919)

As title editor:

- City Girl (1930)
- Christina (1929)
- Lucky Star (1929)
- Black Magic (1929)
- The Rescue (1929)
- The Awakening (1928)
- Mother Machree (1927)
- The Loves of Carmen (1927)
- The Prairie Wife (1925)
- Lost and Found on a South Sea Island (1923)
- Love's Penalty (1921)
