= The Rescue (Conrad novel) =

1920 novel by Joseph Conrad

- First edition
- Author: Joseph Conrad
- Publisher: Doubleday, Page & Co. (US); J. M. Dent (UK)
- Publication date: 1920
- Media type: Print
- Text: The Rescue at Wikisource

The Rescue, A Romance of the Shallows is a 1920 novel by Joseph Conrad. It is one of his works contained in what is now sometimes called the Lingard Trilogy, a group of novels based on Conrad's experience as mate on the steamer Vidar. Although it was the last of the three novels to be published, after Almayer's Folly (1895) and An Outcast of the Islands (1896), the events related in the novel precede those. The story follows Captain Tom Lingard, the recurring protagonist of The Lingard Trilogy, who was on his way to help a native friend regain his land when he falls in love with a married woman whose yacht he saves from foundering.

== Literary and historical background ==
=== Literary ===
In the 1920 Malay Edition of Joseph Conrad's collected works, the publisher Doubleday, Page and Company featured "Author's Notes" at the start of each novel—in his note for The Rescue, Conrad shows great gratitude for its critical reception and gives background on the project and its 20-year hiatus. While initially he had "the contents and the course of" The Rescue clear in his mind, he had doubts about his ability to effectively execute the story. Therefore, he set it aside in 1898 and moved on to write The Nigger of Narcissus, Lord Jim, and Heart of Darkness before he resumed working on the novel in 1918. He admits that he wrestled with its abandonment at first but confesses that the momentum of other pieces made it easier and easier to leave this difficult work behind - and yet he never fully "lost sight" of The Rescue which remained "a dark speck in the misty distance" as the years and pages "stretched wide between" him and his deserted project. In the summer of 1918, as The Great War raged toward its conclusion and the Spanish Flu epidemic began, Conrad returned to his long abandoned project. It was "sentiment," he explains, that drove him back to the work, and though he anticipated the "pains and hazards of that return," he saw, as it "loomed" larger on his approach, that it had "an air of expectant life" and describes the characters' "familiar faces" as knowing he was "bound to come back to them." True to his themes, Conrad rescued the ship he abandoned, and 24 years after he began writing, the title was published in 1920.

== Plot summary ==
Part I. The Man and the Brig

Young Tom Lingard is the owner and captain of a sailing ship, the Lightning which lies becalmed at night, somewhere in the Malayan archipelago. With his chief mate Shaw he discusses the problems that women can cause. Suddenly they are approached by a search party in a boat seeking help for a yacht which has become stranded on mudflats on a nearby island.

Carter, the commander of the boat is interrogated in rather a hostile and suspicious manner which leaves him puzzled, but his boat is put in tow. When they reach the island Lingard handles his brig skilfully, but it transpires that he was heading for the island himself. He fires a warning shot into the interior, then joins the stricken yacht.

Part II. The Shore of Refuge

The story backtracks to explain how Lingard first came into contact with the Wajo leader Hassim, and their instant bond of friendship. Lingard goes to visit Hassim, but is warned off by Jaffir, who reports that Hassim is now a fugitive in a civil war. But Lingard takes a long boat on shore to rescue him, and the sortie is a success.

Lingard begins trading in arms and saving money to help Hassim in the re-conquest of Wajo. He is followed around by Jorgenson, an old sea-captain whose life has been ruined. When Lingard explains his plans to Jorgenson, the older man warns him against taking action, and offers his own life as an example of failure. But in the end, with no future prospects, he agrees to join in the venture, along with his prematurely aged native wife.

Lingard has previously visited local chief Belarab to ask for help, and offers him guns in exchange for manpower. Lingard feels that since he has saved Hassim's life, he is tied to him in some mysterious way. He buys the old schooner Emma and runs it aground close to Belarab to use as a weapons store, placing Jorgenson in charge.

Part III. The Capture

When Lingard arrives on the stricken yacht he is met with hostility from its owner Mr Travers, who thinks he is a vulgar adventurer, intent on profiting from salvaging the yacht. Lingard sees the yacht and its passengers as merely annoying obstacles who have come between him and his plans.

The passenger d'Alcacer is in flight from Europe following the early death of his wife and is friendly with the owner's enigmatic wife Edith Travers. Whilst Lingard and Travers trade insults with each other, d'Alcacer takes an instant liking to Lingard and tries to mediate. But the dispute is interrupted by the sudden arrival of Hassim and his sister Immada.

Mrs Travers is fascinated by Immada's attractiveness, but the girl and her brother reproach Lingard for recently neglecting them, and leave with him when the interview comes to a fruitless conclusion.

On her own after dinner on the yacht, Mrs Travers reflects upon the failure of her romantic dreams. Suddenly, Lingard rows up alongside to talk to her, telling her he feels completely detached from his British roots and more at home with the Malaysians.

He wants her to help him by pretending to be frightened on the yacht, so that they will have no alternative but to accept Lingard's offer to house them on the brig. He tells her the whole background story, which touches her romantic sentiments. She feels existentially elated by his frankness and emotional honesty. She is preparing herself to act on his behalf when she is told that her husband and d'Alcacer have been kidnapped whilst walking along the shore.

Back on the brig, Lingard reads a letter he has received from Jorgenson describing disquiet amongst the natives who want to attack the stranded yacht. The letter warns of a threat from rival local leader Tengga to seize the arms stored on the Emma.

The letter goes on to describe the arrival of Sherif Daman, who also wants the arms for the recapture of Wajo. Lingard receives Carter on board as emissary from the yacht. Carter cannot understand Lingard's or Mrs Travers' motivation in the affair. Then chief mate Shaw protests against Lingard's plans – because he appears to be siding against fellow white men on the yacht.

Part IV. The Gift of the Shallows

Lingard nevertheless goes ahead, and takes Mrs Travers from the yacht onto the brig. He is overawed by her attractiveness and the knowledge that she understands him. He appears to be falling in love with her, but is not aware of it himself. She asks him to rescue d'Alcacer and her husband.

Hassim arrives on the brig with his sister and reports on his visit to the camp where the two prisoners are being held. Lingard decides to recapture the prisoners single-handedly, and he puts Carter in charge of the brig. Immada protests that he is putting himself at risk, whereupon Mrs Travers declares that she will go with him, much to the consternation of Carter, whilst Shaw is outraged at being left with no clear orders.

When Lingard and Mrs Travers reach the Emma Jorgenson is truculent and hostile. Lingard questions Mrs Travers somewhat jealously about d'Alcacer, whilst she in her turn thinks that Lingard is enamoured of Immada, by whom they are joined on board with Hassim.

Part V. The Point of Honour and the Point of Passion

Travers has been rescued and Mrs Travers has adopted native dress on board the Emma. Travers delivers an embittered and pompous lecture to his wife, criticising her behaviour. They argue about Lingard, about whom Travers is arrogant and snobbish.

Travers and d'Alcacer have been released temporarily into Lingard's care. Mrs Travers has had further heart-to-heart conversations with Lingard, and is deeply impressed by his character and his personality. She too appears to be falling in love, but doesn't want to admit it to herself. She would like to share what she knows about Lingard with d'Alcacer, who she regards as a good friend – but she doesn't.

The story backtracks to describe Lingard's arrival at Daman's stockade to negotiate the temporary release of Travers and d'Alcacer. The manoeuvre is successful because of Lingard's high prestige in the locality.

On board the Emma Lingard and Mrs Travers exchange confidences about their earlier lives until they are joined by d'Alcacer, who has been observing their growing intimacy. After dinner d'Alcacer quizzes Mrs Travers about Lingard, whom he calls 'the Man of Fate'. They wonder what will happen to them, and d'Alcacer guesses that Lingard will be heart-broken over Mrs Travers. He asks her to give him a sign if she thinks they are about to die.

Lingard calls Mrs Travers into his room where they interrogate each other and verbally admit their mutual attraction. Lingard has received a letter from Carter saying that (with good intentions) he has attacked some of the natives from on board the Lightning – which automatically puts Lingard's plans into jeopardy.

Lingard has despatched Jaffir to find Hassim and Immada, and Jaffir has suggested that the only solution to the problem will be to return the two prisoners to Daman. Lingard and Mrs Travers agree that this must be done quickly. She gives d'Alcacer the warning signal he has requested.

d'Alcacer braces himself philosophically for what he thinks will be certain death, whilst realising that Mr Travers is ill with some sort of fever. When it is time for them to go, Travers claims that his wife is in the grip of some sort of fashionable craze, but it is he himself who is clearly delirious. After a heated departure from Mrs Travers, Lingard takes the two men on shore to deliver them up.

Part VI. The Claim of Life and the Toll of Death

On board the Emma, Mrs Travers regrets the quarrelsome way she and Lingard parted. Jorgenson meanwhile appears to be making fuses for some sort of explosions. As signs of fighting start up on shore, Mrs Travers wants to join Lingard.

Hassim abandons negotiations with Belarab and is heading back to the Emma when he is intercepted by Tengga's fighters. Jaffir runs to the ship with Hassim's ring and reports to Jorgenson. Mrs Travers is then persuaded to take the ring as a signal to Lingard.

Mrs Travers is rowed onto shore and reaches the stockade bearing a torch, where Lingard is there to receive her. Because she distrusts Jorgenson and does not realise the significance of the ring, she does not pass on to Lingard the message it represents.

Lingard, d'Alcacer, and Mrs Travers talk to each other in turn around a fire. The Spaniard is mainly concerned with the possibility of being murdered the next day, whilst Lingard thinks Mrs Travers could not help herself but join him. She accepts his devotion and tells him nothing, so as not to disturb him. Meanwhile, an envoy from Tengga fails to persuade Jorgenson to leave the Emma.

Two days later, following an explosion of some kind, Lingard is on the Lightning where Carter relates rescuing Jaffir. Lingard recalls in flashback awakening alongside Mrs Travers and being summoned to see Belarab.

Belarab has been informed through spies of all elements of Daman's and Tengga's machinations. In the morning mists there appear to be attacks imminent, but when a flotilla of canoes surrounds the Emma, Jorgenson blows up the ship, whereupon Belarab releases the prisoners.

Jaffir's story continues with his escape from the Emma. He tells Lingard about the ring, then dies. Lingard takes Carter as mate on the Lightning then invites Mrs Travers by letter to meet him on shore.

Next morning d'Alcacer rows Mrs Travers out where she meets Lingard. She wants to confess about the undelivered ring, but he already knows the truth and tells her it would not have made any difference. She departs, returns to the yacht, and throws the ring into the sea. The yacht and the Lightning depart in opposite directions.

== Genre and style ==
=== Genre ===
This novel is described as a "Romance of the Shallows", it is also an adventure novel, specifically a sea story. From the beginning, readers are shown that the novel takes place at sea. There are many times when Lingard refers to himself as an adventurer or being on an adventure. Throughout the text, there are lengthy passages in which the plot comes to a halt while the stifling darkness is described. This helps create the atmosphere of an adventure novel as readers are held in suspense along with the characters. The European characters are depicted constantly interacting with the native peoples, a trope that is used in many adventure novels. Many adventure novels also have an exotic other, the role that the Malay tribes fill in The Rescue.

=== Style ===
The Rescue is written as a narrative, with an omniscient narrator. The story is told through a sequence of unannounced time shifts, both forwards and backwards, a technique which permeates his major works.

== Critical reception ==
Very shortly after publication in 1920, a book review came out in "The Sewanee Review" in which G.H.C. said that The Rescue is "deeply and sincerely imaginative", and "is Conrad at his best"

Also in 1920, The New York Times published an article on The Rescue, in which the 20-year delay from beginning to end of the novel is discussed. Louise Maunsell Field writes that there is a noticeable change in writing style, but it comes at a point where the narrative demands expediency. There is "an increased depth of understanding, an increased subtlety of characterization, of thought, of style". Field also says, "the book is absorbingly interesting: dramatic, subtle, fascinating with allurement".

Heliena Krenn says "It was the Malay Archipelago with its truths about human life dimmed by the mists of its jungles and waterways that started Conrad on his career as a novelist". She is arguing that without the Lingard Trilogy, Conrad's other works on colonialism and imperialism would not have been as powerful. She also argues that to completely understand other works such as Heart of Darkness or Lord Jim, readers must look closely at the Lingard Trilogy. Krenn also points out that the three books must be read as one unit, that actions portrayed in one affect the other two. Looking specifically at The Rescue, Krenn points out that the novel had many omissions in its final publication. According to Krenn, those omissions show Lingard's adventure as an "intended subversion of the interests of European colonial authorities and his motivation as rooted in ambitions for power, the emphasis and attention of the narrative shift to Lingard's conflict of divided loyalties".

According to David Thorburn, Conrad intended for The Rescue to be a boys' book, similar to Robert Louis Stevenson's works. Thorburn quotes Garnett's Letters from Conrad, "I want to make it a kind of glorified book for boys – you know. No analysis. No damned mouthing. Pictures – pictures – pictures. That's what I want to do". Thorburn does not think highly of The Rescue or of Conrad's "grandiose subtitles"; when comparing The Rescue to other works, he briefly mentions it as one of the "disappointing novels" and claims that the excess titling was an expression of weakness.

Thorburn also argues that the character of Tom Lingard is a failure and unconvincing because "the mythic or archetypal collapses back into stereotype when it is too much insisted upon". Thorburn says that Lingard is "intended to hint at epic qualities. But such qualities do not bear too much repeating, and they are reiterated beyond tolerable limits".

== See also ==
- The Rescue
