= Annie Greene Brown =

signature

Annie Greene Brown (née, Greene; pen name, Annie G. Brown; 1855–1923) was an author of the American South.

== Early life and education ==
Annie Finley Greene was born in Tuscaloosa, Alabama, July 25, 1855. Her parents were Thomas Finley and Virginia (Owen) Greene. There were several younger siblings including John, Kate, Robert, Mary, and the writer, Frances Nimmo Greene.

She was educated at home by her mother and attended the Tuscaloosa Female College for two years, graduating with the M. A. degree and highest honors.

== Career ==
She taught in the public schools for two years and also for two years in a college for girls at Sweetwater, Tennessee.

Brown was the author of Fireside Battles, a novel for girls. The story, simply told, describes an old fashioned home left unprovided for by the death of the father. While the mother is portrayed as doing nothing to improve the family's life thereafter, the heroine's efforts gradually conquer poverty and discouragement. The various incidents bring out the strong points and weaknesses of each member of the family.

Some of Brown's short stories were published by The Youth's Companion and Harper's Magazine, besides a number of short sketches and essays that appeared in other publications.

== Personal life ==
In 1881, in Tuscaloosa, she married Eugene Levert Brown. They had a son, Eugene Levert (b. 1885) and a daughter, Mary (b. 1893), who died in childhood.

She was a Democrat, and member of the New church.

Annie Greene Brown lived in Tuscaloosa most of her life, but in later years, made her home in Chicago, Illinois. She died in that city, November 19, 1923.

== Selected works ==
=== Books ===
- Fireside Battles (Chicago; Laird & Lee, 1900)

=== Articles ===
- "The Future Novelist", The Current, 1885
- Prayer: What It Is And How Answered., The Arena, 1898
