= The Rescue (1929 film) =

1929 film

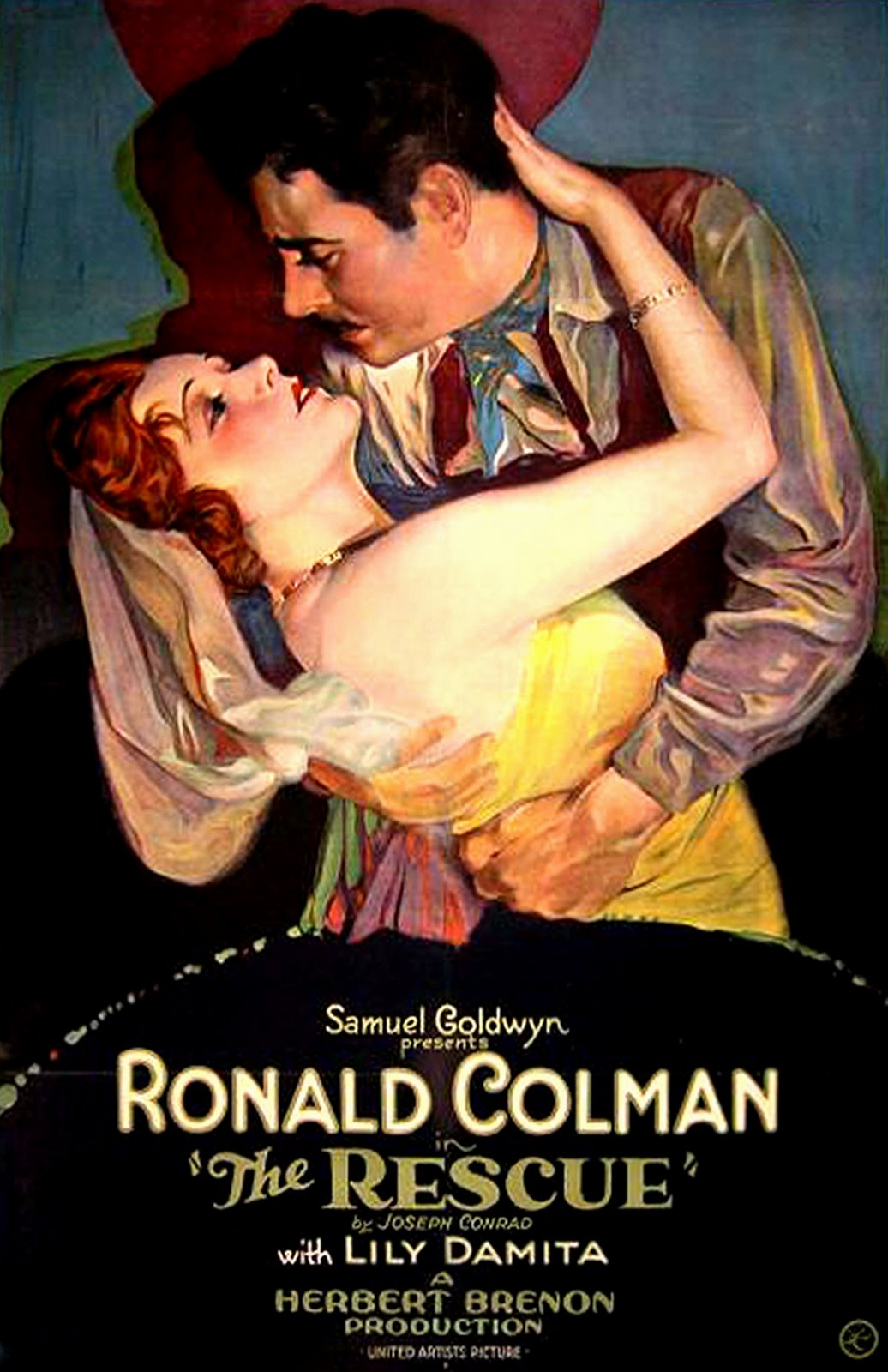
- Theatrical release poster
- Directed by: Herbert Brenon; Ray Lissner (assistant)
- Written by: Elizabeth Meehan
- Based on: The Rescue by Joseph Conrad
- Produced by: Samuel Goldwyn
- Starring: Ronald Colman; Lili Damita
- Cinematography: George Barnes; Joseph F. Biroc; James Wong Howe
- Edited by: Harry H. Caldwell; Marie Halvey; Katherine Hilliker
- Music by: Hugo Riesenfeld
- Production company: Samuel Goldwyn Productions
- Distributed by: United Artists
- Release date: January 12, 1929
- Running time: 96 min. (sound); 7910 ft. (silent)
- Country: United States
- Language: English intertitles

The Rescue is a 1929 American sound pre-Code romantic adventure film directed by Herbert Brenon, and produced by Samuel Goldwyn. While the film has no audible dialog, it was released with a synchronized musical score with sound effects using both the sound-on-disc and sound-on-film process. The screenplay was written by Elizabeth Meehan, based on the 1920 novel by Joseph Conrad. The music score is by Hugo Riesenfeld. The film stars Ronald Colman and Lili Damita.

== Cast ==
- Ronald Colman as Tom Lingard
- Lili Damita as Lady Edith Travers
- Alfred Hickman as Mr. Travers
- Theodore von Eltz as Carter
- John Davidson as Hassim
- Philip Strange as D'Alacer
- Bernard Siegel as Jorgensen
- Sōjin Kamiyama as Daman
- Harry Cording as Belarab
- Laska Winter as Immada
- Duke Kahanamoku as Jaffir
- Louis Morrison as Shaw
- George Regas as Wasub
- Chrispin Martin as Tenga

== Production ==
Water scenes were filmed were filmed at Santa Cruz Island, with a two way radio set up to contact Goldwyn Studios.

== Music ==
The musical score featured in the film was composed by Hugo Riesenfeld.

== Censorship ==
When The Rescue was released, each province in Canada had a censor board that could order eliminations or cuts in the film. The Montreal censor board required the intertitles to be rewritten so that Lady Edith was the sister of Mr. Travers and not his wife, causing some confusion in the plot.

== Preservation ==
An incomplete print, missing one reel, is in the collection of the George Eastman House film archive.

== See also ==
- List of early sound feature films (1926–1929)
