= The Gateway of the Moon =

1928 film

- Directed by: John Griffith Wray
- Written by: H.H. Caldwell; Katherine Hilliker; Bradley King
- Based on: Upstream by Clifford Bax
- Produced by: William Fox
- Starring: Dolores del Río; Walter Pidgeon; Anders Randolf
- Cinematography: Chester A. Lyons
- Production company: Fox Film Corporation
- Distributed by: Fox Film Corporation
- Release date: January 1, 1928
- Running time: 60 minutes
- Country: United States
- Languages: Silent; English intertitles

The Gateway of the Moon is a lost American 1928 silent film directed by John Griffith Wray and starring Dolores del Río, Walter Pidgeon and Anders Randolf.

As noted, the film was published in 1928. The most popular film of that year was The Circus, an American silent comedy film by Charlie Chaplin. Until 2022 at least 66,300 English language films had seen the light of day.

== Plot ==
Arthur Wyatt, an American railroad conductor, is lost in the jungle of the Amazon in South America. He is rescued by Chela, the beautiful princess of a native tribe.

== Cast ==
- Dolores del Río as Chela (Toni)
- Walter Pidgeon as Arthur Wyatt
- Anders Randolf as George Gillespie
- Leslie Fenton as Jim Mortlake
- Ted McNamara as Henry Hooker
- Adolph Milar as Rudolf Gottman
- Noble Johnson as Soriano
- Virginia LaFonde as Indian Child

== See also ==
- 1937 Fox vault fire
