= H. H. Caldwell =

American screenwriter

H.H. Caldwell
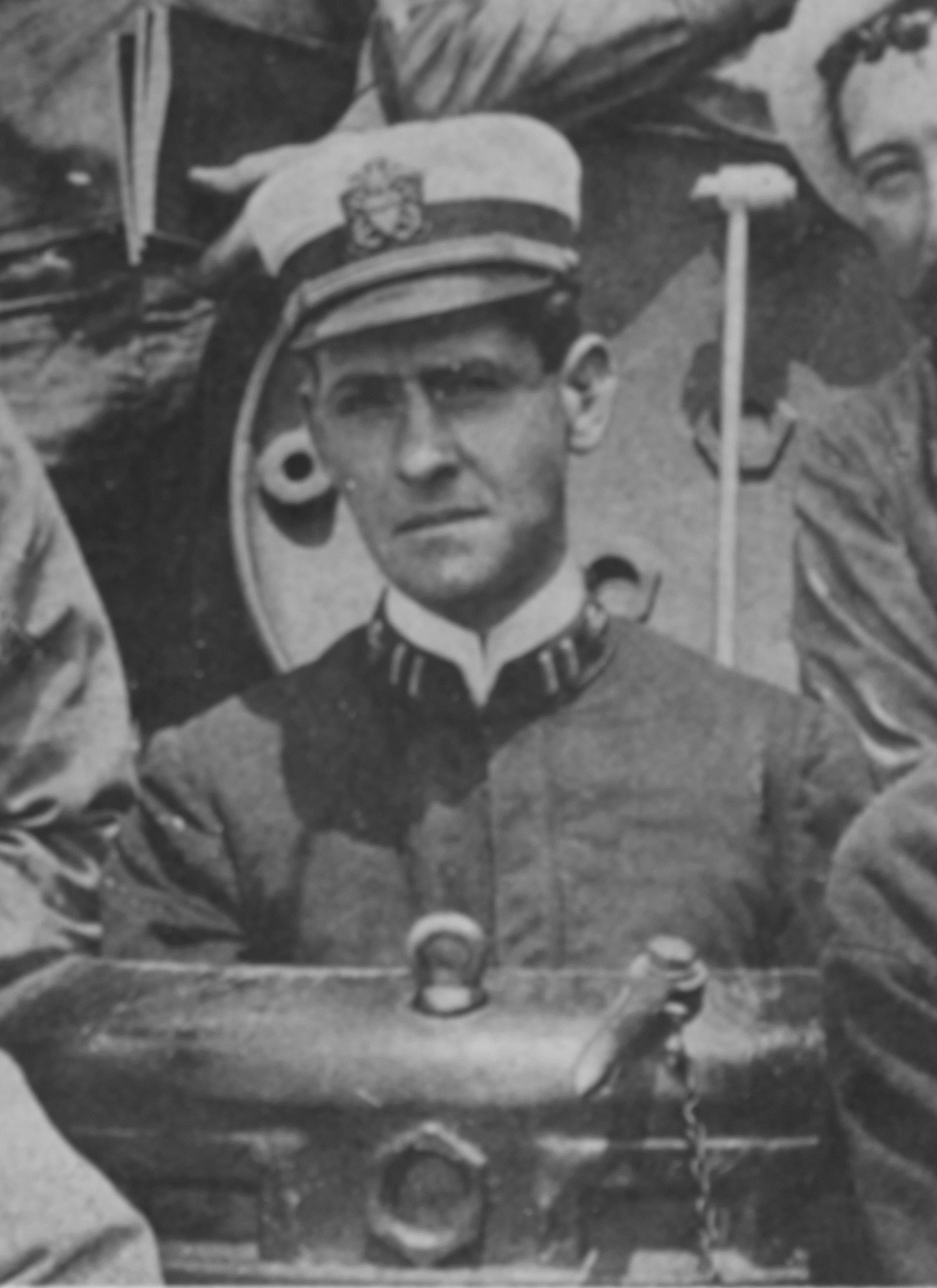
- Caldwell in 1901
- Born: Harry Handly Caldwell; February 5, 1873; St. Louis, Missouri, US
- Died: April 27, 1939 (aged 66); New York City, US
- Burial place: Arlington National Cemetery
- Military career
- Allegiance: United States
- Branch: United States Navy
- Service years: 1887–1909; 1917–1919
- Rank: Commander
- Conflicts: Spanish–American War: Battle of Manila Bay; World War I: U-boat Campaign
- Awards: Spanish Campaign Medal; Dewey Medal
- Other work: Writer, Editor in Motion Picture Industry

Harry Handly Caldwell (February 5, 1873 – April 27, 1939) was America's first submarine captain. He became the first naval submarine commanding officer, of any nation, when he assumed command of USS Holland (SS-1) on October 12, 1900.

== Early life and naval academy ==
Harry Handly Caldwell was born in St. Louis, Missouri in on February 5, 1873. He was appointed to the United States Naval Academy from Quincy, Illinois in 1887 and graduated in 1891.

== Naval career ==
Following graduation, during his mandatory two-year midshipman deployment, he served aboard the USS Concord. After promotion to Ensign, he saw service on the USS Monadnock, and USS Michigan. Other sea duty assignments involved protecting missionaries during the First Sino-Japanese War.

Spanish-American War

Prior to the Spanish–American War, Caldwell was serving on board the cruiser Olympia as flag secretary to Admiral George Dewey. As war with Spain grew imminent, Dewey moved the fleet from Hong Kong to Mirs Bay. Ensign Caldwell remained behind, awaiting official word of war from the United States. When he received the declaration, Caldwell made a daring journey through hostile and undeveloped parts of China, by open boat and on horseback, to deliver the news to Dewey. During the Battle of Manila Bay, Caldwell took charge of dispatches and commanded a secondary battery aboard the Olympia, which made him eligible for the Manila Bay Medal. He was cited for his bravery and advanced in rank. Upon his return home to Quincy, its citizens presented him with a silver loving cup, an imitation of the gold one presented to Dewey in New York.

After the war, Caldwell remained with Dewey as his aide and secretary. He was promoted to Lieutenant (junior grade) on March 3, 1899. On November 9, 1899, he was best man at Admiral Dewey's wedding to Mrs. Mildred McLean Hazen.

USS Holland

In March 1900, Admiral Dewey was invited to ride aboard the Holland when it was undergoing exhibition on the Potomac River. When the Admiral politely declined, Caldwell was offered the opportunity and accepted. Caldwell was highly impressed by the new craft and requested to serve aboard her when she became a commissioned warship. Caldwell commanded Holland during its pre commissioning trials off Newport, Rhode Island in August to September 1900. During the trials, Caldwell closed to within torpedo range of the USS Kearsarge, flagship of the U.S. Navy's North Atlantic Squadron, without being detected. While in command, he also trained crews to man submarines under construction for the Navy by the Electric Boat Company.

Following his submarine experience, he served on the USS Maine. Next he conducted inspection duty at the Philadelphia and Camden Shipyards, overseeing construction at Cramp's and Neafie & Levy's shipyards. This was followed by service as navigator aboard the USS Milwaukee. He was promoted to lieutenant commander on 1 January 1906.

Court martial

In May 1909, he was found guilty by court martial of "conduct to the prejudice of good order and discipline" due to overindulgence in alcohol. One month later, on June 15, 1909, he retired after almost 22 years in uniform. After his retirement, he entered the motion picture industry. In 1916, he became the vice president of the C. L. Chester Company, producing travel documentaries.

Return to duty

On May 10, 1917, at the beginning of World War I, he returned to duty in the Fleet Naval Reserve. He commanded the Amphitrite, the guard ship of New York Harbor. He was in charge of the submarine net protecting New York harbor, and all entering vessels had to report to him. He was promoted to commander on November 14, 1919.

== Post-naval career ==
After the war, he resumed his position at the C. L. Chester Pictures Corporation where he met and, in 1921, married Katherine Hilliker (née Clark). Together they collaborated to write plays and movie scenarios for leading companies like Metro-Goldwyn-Mayer, United Artists, and Fox. They also worked as production editors on many well-known silent and talking pictures, including Ben Hur and 7th Heaven. They were the parents of Captain Harry H. Caldwell Jr. (1922–2008), whose early career was also as a submarine officer in the U.S. Navy.

== Death ==
Caldwell died in the Brooklyn Naval Hospital on April 27, 1939 and is buried with his wife in Arlington National Cemetery.

== Selected filmography ==
- The Right of the Strongest (1924)
- Ben-Hur: A Tale of the Christ (1925)
- The Prairie Wife (1925)
- The Devil's Circus (1926)
- 7th Heaven (1927)
- Sunrise (1927)
- The Loves of Carmen (1927)
- Street Angel (1928)
- Mother Machree (1928)
- The Awakening (1928)
- Four Sons (1928)
- The Gateway of the Moon (1928)
- No Other Woman (1928)
- Eternal Love (1929)
- Lucky Star (1929)
- The Rescue (1929)
- Christina (1929)
- The Far Call (1929)
- The Exalted Flapper (1929)
- City Girl (1930)
