= The Prairie Wife =

1925 film

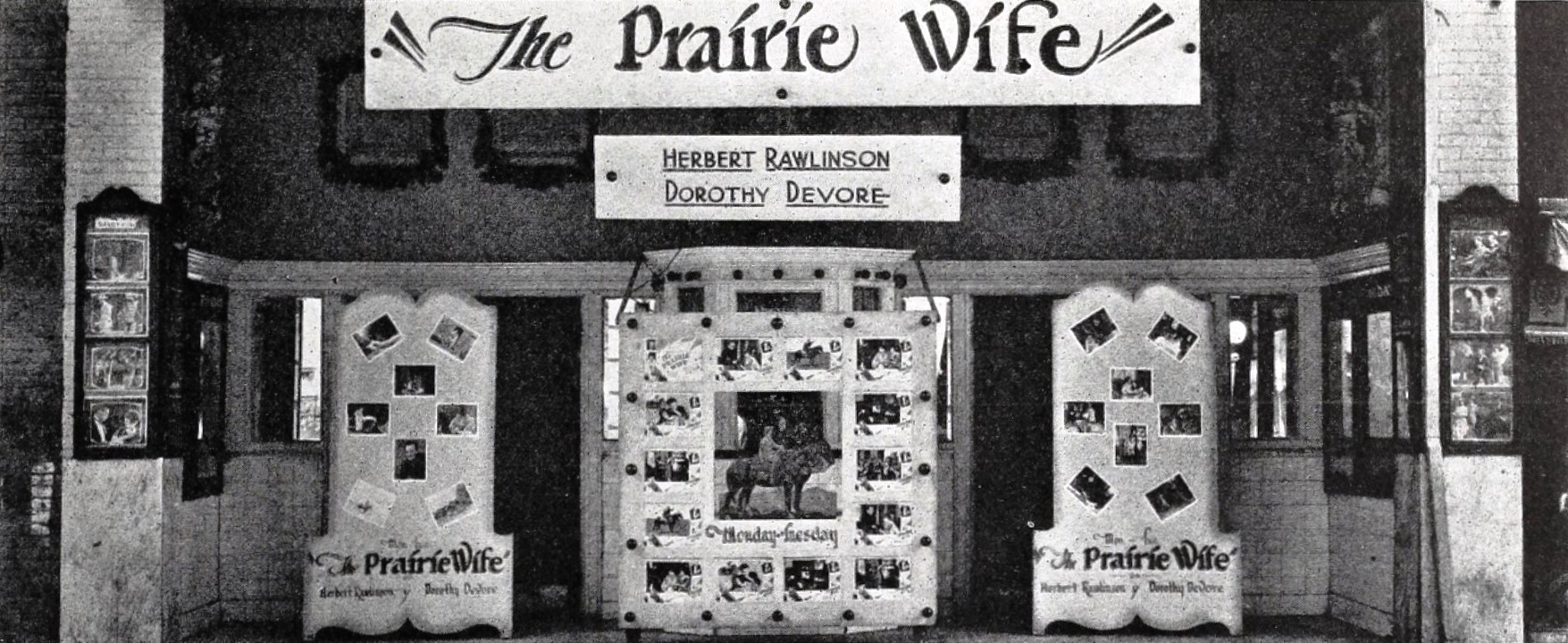
- Theater showing the film
- Directed by: Hugo Ballin
- Written by: Hugo Ballin; Harry H. Caldwell; Katherine Hilliker; Arthur Stringer
- Starring: Dorothy Devore; Herbert Rawlinson
- Cinematography: James Diamond
- Edited by: Harry H. Caldwell; Katherine Hilliker
- Distributed by: Metro-Goldwyn-Mayer
- Release date: February 23, 1925
- Running time: 70 minutes
- Country: United States
- Language: Silent (English intertitles)

The Prairie Wife is a 1925 American silent Western film directed by Hugo Ballin and featuring Boris Karloff, and based on a story by Arthur Stringer. The film is considered to be lost.

== Plot ==
As described in a film magazine review, a telegram informs Chaddie Green that her father has committed suicide, leaving her penniless. She has been reared in luxury, but, during her passage to the United States, she is so lonely that she makes an acquaintance with Duncan MacKail, a rugged appearing man from the American plains. He loves her and they decide to get married. At his ranch, she is extremely out of place, not knowing the method of ranch life or work and untrained for hard farm work. She is frightened by the presence of Ollie, the caretaker for Duncan. Nearby is Percy Woodhouse, an Englishman seeking health on the prairies. Chaddie is obliged to stay at his ranch over night when her horse bolts from her and she is unable to get a mount from Percy. Duncan is angered when she does not return and accuses Percy. Later, Ollie is found dangling from a rope in the barn. Chaddie's picture of her father is found in the room of Ollie, which is explained by a note saying he had killed the man. A son is later born to Chaddie, who has grown content to live and work on the prairie with Duncan.

== Cast ==
- Dorothy Devore as Chaddie Green
- Herbert Rawlinson as Duncan MacKail
- Gibson Gowland as Ollie
- Leslie Stuart as Percy Woodhouse
- Frances Primm as Olga (credited as Frances Prim)
- Boris Karloff as Diego
- Erich von Ritzau as Doctor
- Rupert Franklin as Rufus Green
- Alphonse Martell as Count de Chateaunois (uncredited)

== Reception ==
It received a lukewarm review in Film Daily, as having some "humorous touches scattered through" but overlong. Variety wrote that "for a cheap picture, it should more than get the production cost back and show a corking profit."

== See also ==
- Boris Karloff filmography
