= The Exalted Flapper =

1929 film

- Directed by: James Tinling
- Screenplay by: H. H. Caldwell; Ray Harris; Matt Taylor
- Based on: The Exalted Flapper by William Henry Irwin
- Starring: Sue Carol; Barry Norton; Irene Rich; Albert Conti; Sylvia Field; Stuart Erwin
- Cinematography: Charles G. Clarke
- Edited by: H. H. Caldwell
- Music by: Arthur Kay
- Production company: Fox Film Corporation
- Distributed by: Fox Film Corporation
- Release date: June 9, 1929
- Running time: 61 minutes
- Country: United States
- Languages: Sound (Synchronized); English Intertitles

The Exalted Flapper is a 1929 American Synchronized sound comedy film directed by James Tinling and written by H. H. Caldwell, Ray Harris and Matt Taylor. The film stars Sue Carol, Barry Norton, Irene Rich, Albert Conti, Sylvia Field and Stuart Erwin. While the film has no audible dialog, it was released with a synchronized musical score with sound effects using both the sound-on-disc and sound-on-film process The film was released on June 9, 1929, by Fox Film Corporation.

== Cast ==
- Sue Carol as Princess Izola
- Barry Norton as Prince Boris of Dacia
- Irene Rich as Queen Charlotte of Capra
- Albert Conti as King Alexander of Capra
- Sylvia Field as Marjorie
- Stuart Erwin as Bimbo Mehaffey
- Lawrence Grant as Premier Vadisco of Dacia
- Charles Clary as Dr. Nicholas
- Michael Visaroff as Old Fritz

== See also ==
- List of early sound feature films (1926–1929)
