= Mother Machree =

1928 film by John Ford

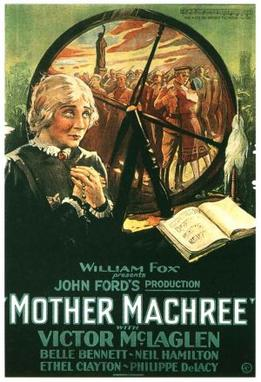
- Film poster
- Directed by: John Ford (uncredited)
- Written by: Rida Johnson Young
- Produced by: John Ford
- Starring: Belle Bennett; Neil Hamilton; Ethel Clayton; Philippe De Lacy
- Cinematography: Chester A. Lyons
- Edited by: Harry H. Caldwell; Katherine Hilliker
- Distributed by: Fox Film Corporation
- Release date: January 22, 1928
- Running time: 75 minutes
- Country: United States
- Languages: Sound (Synchronized) (English intertitles)
- Budget: $750,000 (estimated)

Mother Machree is a 1928 American synchronized sound drama film directed by John Ford that is based on the 1924 work The Story of Mother Machree by Rida Johnson Young about a poor Irish immigrant in America. While the film has no audible dialog, it was released with a synchronized musical score, singing and sound effects using the sound-on-film movietone process. Rida Johnson Young had invented Mother Machree in the stage show Barry of Ballymoore in 1910. John Wayne has a minor role in the film.

== Plot ==
Surviving portion of the film

In the Irish coastal village of Ballymore in 1899, Ellen McHugh (Belle Bennett) becomes a widow when her husband is killed in a violent storm at sea. Alone but fiercely determined to give her young son Brian (Philippe De Lacy) a better future, she decides to emigrate to America.

After arriving in the United States, Ellen faces hardship and loneliness. She finds only fleeting comfort and no stable work until a chance encounter with a flamboyant carnival strongman, Terence O'Dowd (Victor McLaglen)—known as the Giant of Kilkenny—who persuades her to join his traveling sideshow act. Ellen reluctantly agrees, appearing under the guise of a freak attraction called the “Half-Woman” in order to earn enough to support Brian.

Thanks to her earnings, she manages to place Brian in a fashionable private school, where the headmistress takes a personal liking to the well-mannered boy. But when the school discovers the truth about Ellen’s sideshow employment, she is faced with an agonizing choice: either give up her son or have him expelled. Wanting what is best for his future, Ellen chooses to surrender Brian into the guardianship of the school principal, and he is renamed Brian van Studdiford to conceal his origins.

Years pass. Ellen, now working as a scrubwoman in a Fifth Avenue mansion owned by the wealthy Cutting family, gradually proves her worth and eventually becomes the housekeeper. There, she raises young Edith Cutting (Constance Howard) practically as her own daughter.

Meanwhile, Terence O'Dowd also reinvents himself in America—first continuing his carnival career, then later becoming a genial New York policeman. Quietly, he remains a devoted friend to Ellen, helping her from the sidelines and eventually joining the 69th Regiment during wartime in order to keep a protective eye on Brian.

The story leaps forward to 1917. Brian (now played by Neil Hamilton) has grown into a young man—an attorney unaware of his true parentage. He meets and falls in love with Edith Cutting, the same girl Ellen helped raise, and the two become engaged just as America enters the First World War.

On the eve of Brian’s departure for the front lines, revelations unfold. Ellen’s true identity as Brian’s mother is discovered. In a tearful reunion, Brian finally learns of the sacrifices Ellen made for him. He is overwhelmed but deeply moved by her unwavering devotion. In one poignant Movietone sequence, Brian sits at a piano and performs the titular song, “Mother Machree”, with perfect synchronization—a tribute to the woman he now knows as his mother.

Ellen's love and quiet courage are finally acknowledged. Her identity no longer hidden, she becomes a cherished member of the family she helped build. Brian and Edith marry, and Ellen is no longer “Mother Machree” in secret—she is celebrated, loved, and honored at last.

== Cast ==
- Belle Bennett as Mother Machree (Ellen McHugh)
- Neil Hamilton as Brian McHugh, aka Brian van Studdiford
- Victor McLaglen as The Giant of Kilkenny (Terence O'Dowd)
- Constance Howard as Edith Cutting
- Philippe De Lacy as Brian McHugh (as a child)
- Ted McNamara as The Harper of Wexford
- Billy Platt as The Dwarf of Munster (Pips) (billed as William Platt)
- Eulalie Jensen as Rachel van Studdiford
- Pat Somerset as Bobby de Puyster
- John Wayne (bit player)

== Music ==
The film featured a theme song titled "Mother Machree", composed by Chauncey Olcott, Ernest Ball and Rida Johnson Young. Also featured on the soundtrack is Victor Herbert's "Eileen."

== Production ==
The production of the film was a protracted one; the film was originally announced by Fox publicity in June 1926, with filming slated for September. In November, it was announced that it would premiere on December 12, 1926, tying in with the marketing campaign of the music and discs of the title song. However, its release was ultimately delayed because Fox had plans to release it with a Movietone synchronised music score and sound-effects track.

== Release ==
In May 1927, Mother Machree was privately previewed at a Fox sales convention in Atlantic City, New Jersey, along with Sunrise and 7th Heaven (1927), as a showcase of the new Movietone process, and that September, a silent version was previewed at the Astoria Theatre in London. By the beginning of 1928, the delays were amounting to approximately $750,000 because its release was deferred owing to the release schedule of the Fox Movietone features. On January 22, 1928, the film premiered at the Globe Theatre in New York.

The film is also notable for containing the first synchronous sound sequence using the Movietone process in a feature film, a short scene featuring Brian McHugh (Neil Hamilton) singing the title song "Mother Machree", which featured in the original stage show.

== Preservation ==
Only four reels out of seven of this movie survive. Incomplete prints exist (reels one, two and five) in the Library of Congress film archive; and in the UCLA Film & Television Archive film archive (reels two, five and seven); reels three, four and six are presumed lost.

== See also ==
- List of American films of 1928
- List of early sound feature films (1926–1929)
- Lost film
