= City Girl (1930 film) =

1930 film

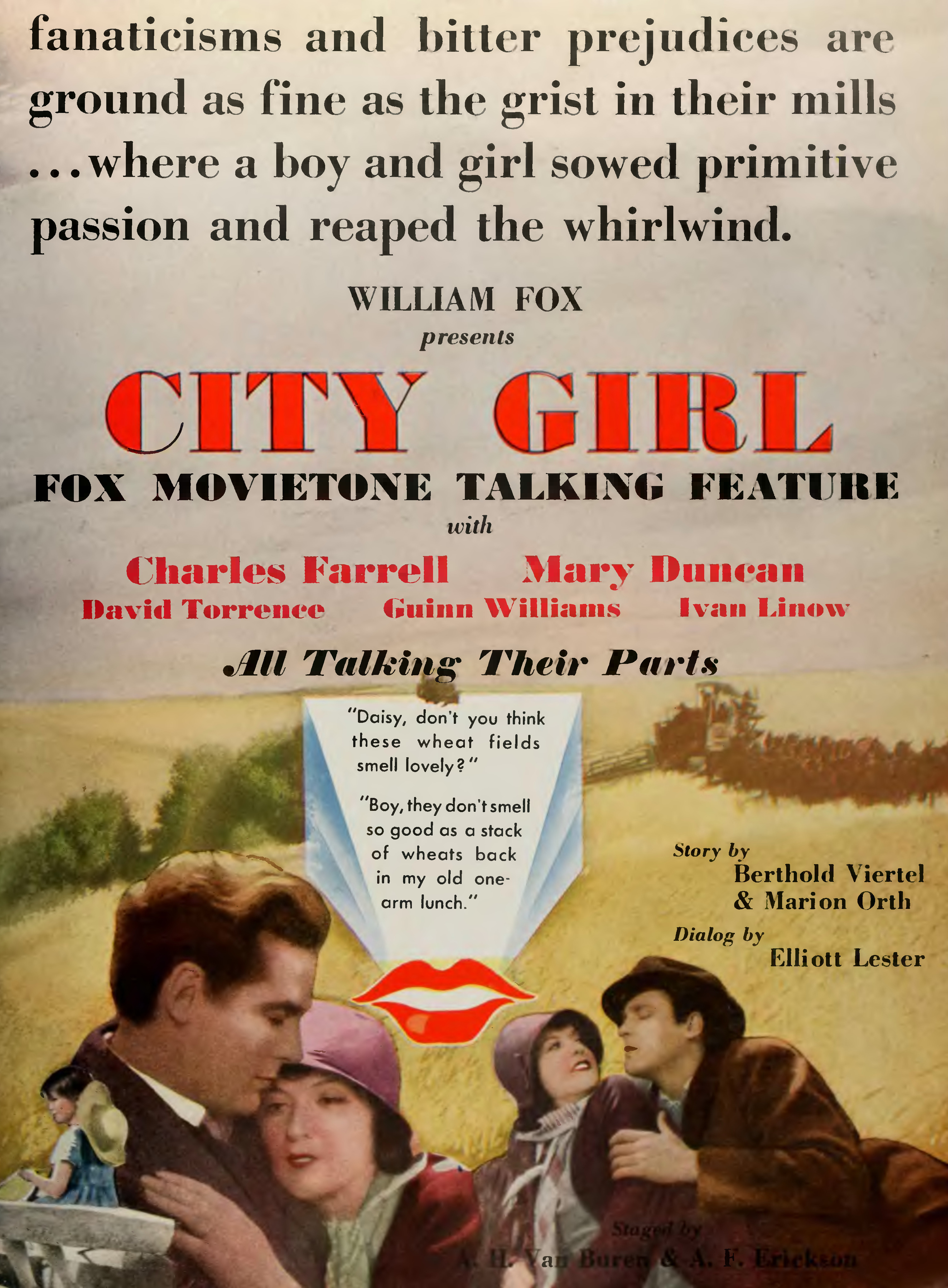
- City Girl ad in The Film Daily
- Directed by: F. W. Murnau
- Written by: Marion Orth; Berthold Viertel
- Based on: The Mud Turtle by Elliott Lester
- Produced by: William Fox
- Starring: Charles Farrell; Mary Duncan
- Cinematography: Ernest Palmer
- Edited by: Harry H. Caldwell; Katherine Hilliker
- Music by: Arthur Kay
- Production company: Fox Film Corporation
- Distributed by: Fox Film Corporation
- Release date: February 16, 1930
- Running time: 68 minutes (part-talkie version); 89 minutes (silent version)
- Country: United States
- Languages: Sound film (part-talkie); English intertitles

City Girl is a 1930 American drama film directed by F. W. Murnau, and starring Charles Farrell and Mary Duncan. It follows a waitress in Chicago who falls in love with a farmer in Minnesota and leaves her life in the city to be with him. It is based upon the play "The Mud Turtle" by Elliot Lester.

Though shot as a silent feature, the film was refitted with some sound elements and released in 1930 as a part-talkie sound film (now lost) due to the public apathy to silent films. While the part-talkie film has a few talking sequences, the majority of the film features a synchronized musical score with sound effects using both the sound-on-disc and sound-on-film process.

City Girl was filmed on location in Athena and Pendleton in eastern Oregon in 1928, with some additional exterior shooting taking place in Portland. After location shooting was completed, interior shoots were undertaken on soundstages in Los Angeles. Fox Film Corporation executives who were unimpressed with the film intervened in its post-production process, introducing sound elements against Murnau's wishes. The part-talkie version of the film, which included contributions from director A. F. Erickson, was released theatrically in February 1930.

In 1937, the original negatives of the part-talkie version were destroyed in a vault fire at Fox Studios, and the film was thereafter assumed to be lost. In 1970, a print of Murnau's original, longer silent version of the film was discovered in the Fox vaults by an archivist from the Museum of Modern Art, where it was subsequently exhibited in June 1970.

The film is credited as being the primary inspiration for Terrence Malick's film Days of Heaven (1978). It was Murnau's penultimate directorial feature before his death in 1931.

== Plot ==
The surviving silent version of City Girl

Lem Tustine is sent to Chicago by his father to sell the family farm's wheat crop. He meets Kate, a waitress who is sick of the endless bustle of the city, and has dreams of living in the countryside. The stock market price of wheat starts to drop, and Lem hurriedly sells the crop for far less than the bottom line his father had given him.

Meanwhile, Lem has fallen in love with Kate, and they marry. They travel back to the countryside in Minnesota, but Lem's father, angry at the disastrous wheat sale, subjects Kate to hostility and physical abuse, mistakenly believing that she is simply after Lem's money. Lem fails to stand up to his father in support of Kate, and the relationship appears doomed. Matters are made worse when a group of farm hands arrive to help with the wheat harvest, and one of them named Mac tries to woo Kate. Lem's father interprets Mac's unwanted attentions as evidence of Kate's wanton nature, and he swears to break Lem and Kate apart.

When reports of a hailstorm destroying the country's wheat crops arrives, Lem's father tries to get the crop in early by working through the night. In an attempt to gain Kate's affections, Mac calls a strike to sabotage the harvest. Lem, reading a farewell letter from Kate, realizes that his own lack of action has caused all the misery, and he finally responds. He fights with Mac, berates his father and then searches for Kate. The workers abandon Mac and return to finish the harvest. Lem and Kate talk and finally agree to try again. Lem's father begs forgiveness from Kate as the film ends.

== Cast ==
- Charles Farrell as Lem Tustine
- Mary Duncan as Kate
- David Torrence as Mr. Tustine
- Edith Yorke as Mrs. Tustine
- Anne Shirley as Marie Tustine
- Tom McGuire as Matey
- Richard Alexander as Mac
- Roscoe Ates as reaper
- Ivan Linow as taxi driver
- Arnold Lucy as cafe patron
- Helen Lynch as girl on train
- Jack Pennick as reaper
- Guinn Williams as reaper
- Mark Hamilton as Greasy the reaper

== Production ==
=== Filming ===
City Girl was shot on location in Athena and Pendleton, Oregon. The film's original working title was Our Daily Bread. Upon her arrival to shoot the film in August 1928, Duncan was granted the title of Round-Up Queen of the 1928 Pendleton Round-Up rodeo. On August 12, 1928, while completing the location scouting, Murnau was hospitalized in Pendleton where he underwent an emergency appendectomy due to appendicitis. During Murnau's recovery, actor Jack Pennick and other cast and crew members traveled to Portland where some exterior shooting was completed.

A farm was used in the making of the film in Thorn Hollow, a rural area 6 miles (9.7 km) south of Athena. The cast and crew traveled approximately 45 miles (72 km) each day from Pendelton to the farm while filming. Filming began on August 30, 1928. Location shooting in Oregon was completed on September 30, 1928, after which interiors were shot on soundstages in Los Angeles in October 1928.

The Fox Film studios for whom Murnau was working were subject to a takeover during filming. The new owners requested a number of changes to the film, including a new title-City Girl-and the addition of sound sequences, which Murnau resisted. Murnau eventually parted ways with the studio to begin filming Tabu, A Story of the South Seas before Fox formally terminated his contract, after which A. F. Erickson directed the sound segments of the film. Portions of Erickson's filming took place between October and November 1929.

== Music ==
The original score for City Girl was composed by Arthur Kay. The film featured a theme song entitled “In the Valley of My Dreams” which was composed by Pierre Norman and James Hanley.

== Release ==
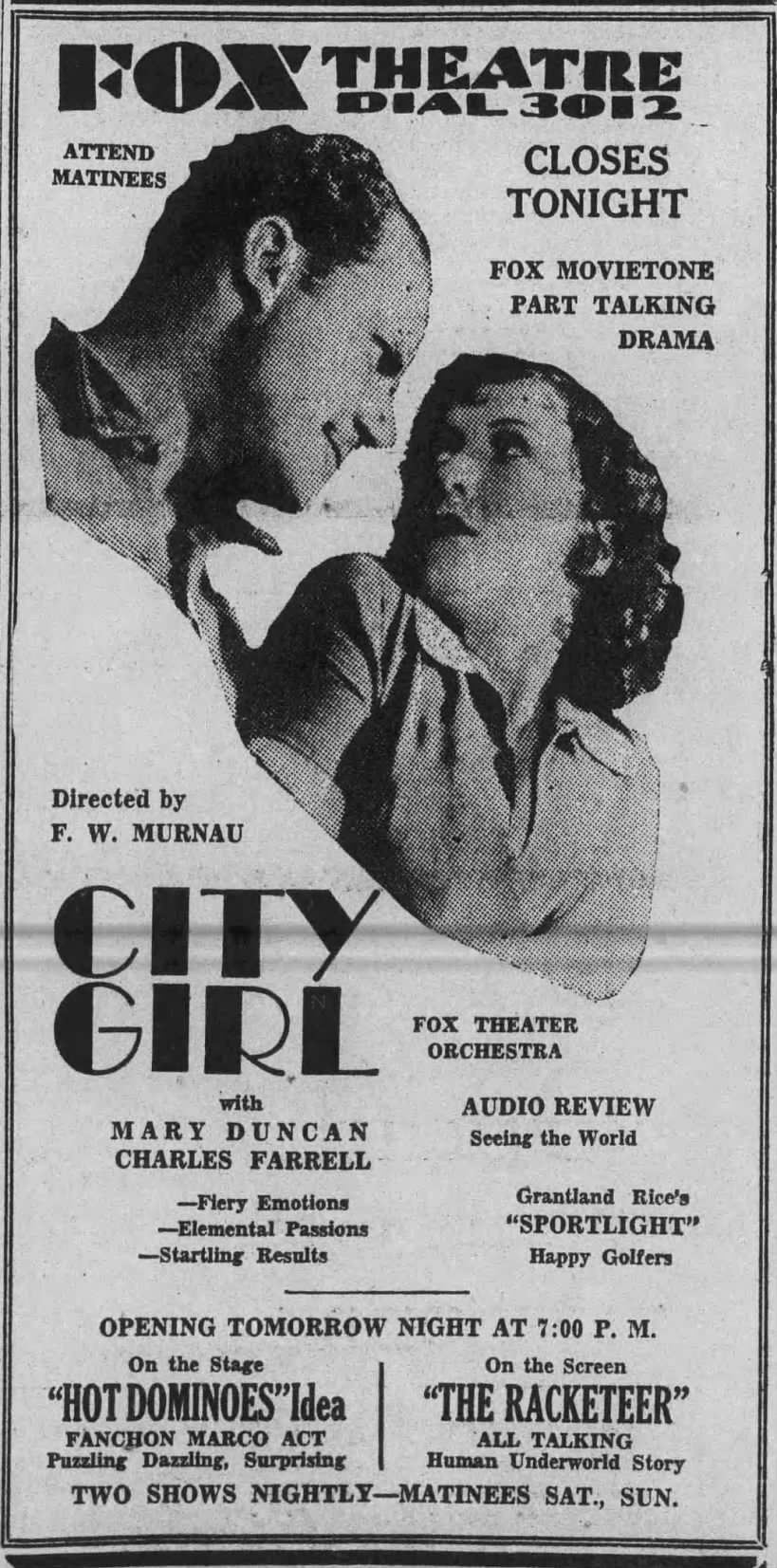
Newspaper advertisement in the Butte, Montana Daily Post, February 1930

The part-sound version of City Girl—which ran 68 minutes in length—was released in the United States on February 16, 1930, at a time when all-talking pictures were the norm. Consequently, the film flopped at the box office because it was considered extremely outdated by the time it was in general release.

=== Loss and rediscovery ===
The part-talkie version of the film that was released in 1930 was destroyed in a storage vault fire at Fox Studios in 1937, and the film was believed to be lost.

In 1969, forgotten 35 mm copy of Murnau's original silent version of the film (during the early sound era, silent versions were routinely made for theatres that had not yet converted to sound) was among those discovered in the Fox vaults by Eileen Bowser, an archivist at the Museum of Modern Art. After its discovery, Bowser screened the film at the museum in June 1970. This is the only version of the film known to survive.

=== Home media ===
In December 2008, 20th Century Fox Home Entertainment released the film on DVD as part of their Mornau, Borzage, and Fox box set, which featured films by Murnau and Frank Borzage. Televista released a DVD edition the following year on February 19, 2009.

Eureka! Entertainment released a region B Blu-ray and DVD edition of the film in 2010 through their Masters of Cinema line, which is out of print as of 2025. On October 20, 2015, Fox released a standalone DVD through their Fox Archives line.

== Reception ==
=== Contemporary ===
The Mount Vernon Argus praised Duncan's performance in the film, as well as noting it as "gripping human story" with "deft directorial touches, appealing dialogue, and photography that holds the attention." The Los Angeles Evening Post-Record critic J. E. J. praised the film as a "masterpiece of human emotions."

The Montana Standard praised the film's performances and its unglamorous, realistic portrayals of its characters. The Philadelphia Inquirer similarly praised the film's realism, particularly in its use of rural locations, describing it as a "well-directed story on contrasts in life of city and country folk."

=== Retrospective ===
The Chicago Reader critic David Kehr wrote in 1985 that "The film was severely cut and released only after some sound sequences had been added, against Murnau’s wishes. The version currently in circulation is a partly restored one, entirely silent and a half hour longer than the original release print, but is still crippled. Some of Murnau’s genius remains in the lighting of individual shots, and particularly in a lyrical sequence in which a man (Charles Farrell), a woman (Mary Duncan), and Murnau’s camera dance through a sunlit field."

The majority of retrospective assessment of the film has been largely favorable, with Philip French of The Guardian declaring the film a "lyrical masterpiece of pastoral lyricism. A rural melodrama of great beauty and honesty" in 2011. Geoff Andrew of Time Out wrote that the film is "wildly underrated." Senses of Cinema critic Adrian Danks wrote of the film in 2003: "City Girl relies upon the extraordinary framing and masterful manipulation of off-screen space (that suggests a complex world just outside the limits of the frame) characteristic of Murnau’s cinema but shifts toward a more American tone, sensibility and pared-back, starkly realised mise-en-scène."

Director Terrence Malick acknowledged that the film was his foremost inspiration for his film Days of Heaven (1978), and he has cited it as one of his favorite films of all time.

On the review aggregator website Rotten Tomatoes, 63% of 8 critics' reviews are positive.

== See also ==
- List of American films of 1930

== Sources ==
- Bergstrom, Janet (2007). "Chronicle of Lost Films (4 Devils, City Girl)". In Lewis, Jon; Smoodin, Eric (eds.). Looking Past the Screen: Case Studies in American Film History and Method. Durham, North Carolina: Duke University Press. pp. 303–352. ISBN 978-0-822-39013-8.
- Hanich, Julian (2022). Friedrich Wilhelm Murnau: City Girl (in German). Munich, Germany: et+k, Edition Text + Kritik. ISBN 978-3-967-07736-0.
- Klepper, Robert K. (2015). Silent Films, 1877-1996: A Critical Guide to 646 Movies. Jefferson, North Carolina: McFarland. ISBN 978-1-476-60484-8.
- Petrie, Graham (2002). Hollywood Destinies: European Directors in America, 1922-1931. Detroit, Michigan: Wayne State University Press. ISBN 978-0-814-32958-0.
- Thompson, Franklin T. (1996). Lost Films: Important Movies that Disappeared. New York City, New York: Carol Publishing Group. ISBN 978-0-806-51604-2.
