= Frances Nimmo Greene =

American educator and author

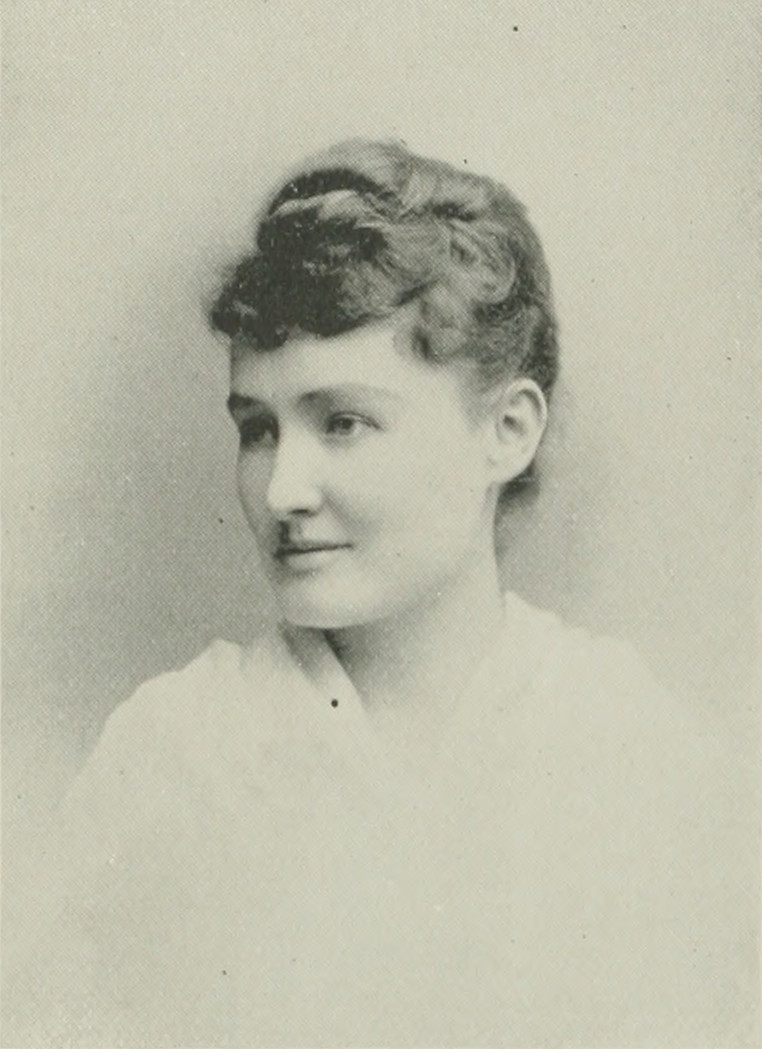
- "A Woman of the Century"
- Born: April 5, 1867; Tuscaloosa, Alabama, U.S.
- Died: December 9, 1937 (aged 70); Birmingham, Alabama, U.S.
- Other name: "Dixie"
- Education: Tuscaloosa Female College
- Occupations: author; educator
- Relatives: Annie Greene Brown (sister)
- Writing career
- Genres: novels; children's literature; plays
- Notable work: The Right of the Strongest

Frances Nimmo Greene (April 5, 1867 – December 9, 1937) was an American educator and author of Southern literature including novels, children's literature, and plays. She was the author of: King Arthur and his court, 1901, stories of chivalry for children; With spurs of gold, 1905, stories of chivalry for children written in collaboration with Dolly Kirk; My country's voice, 1917, for juveniles; America first, 1917, for juveniles; American ideals; a series of patriotic readers for children; a group of one act plays; and the following novels, Into the night, 1909; The Right of the Strongest, 1913; One clear call, 1914; and The devil to pay, 1917.

Three of her novels were adapted into films, The Devil to Pay (1920), One Clear Call (1922), and The Right of the Strongest (1924). She also wrote more than 50 short stories which were published in newspapers and magazines of national repute. In addition, Greene organized the library division of the Alabama State Department of Archives and History.

== Early life and education ==
Frances Nimmo Greene was born in Tuscaloosa, Alabama, April 5, 1867. (Note: According to Willard & Livermore (1893), Greene was born "in the late 1860s". According to VIAF, Greene was born in 1850.) Known to the public as "Dixie", she was raised in a historic plantation house, later known as the Jemison School building.

Her father, Thomas Finley Greene (1829–1905), was a clergyman, and her mother was Virginia F. Owen (1828–1905); they married in 1854. She was descended through her father from a prominent South Carolina family, and through her mother from Virginia ancestry. Her mother's family had literary tastes for several generations.

Greene had five older siblings: Annie (1855–1923), John (1857–1859), Kate (1859–1870), Robert (1862–1926), and Mary (1865–1918). The Greenes were a "literary" family from their nursery days. The siblings scribbled as children, and all, more or less, continued to write in later years, but Frances showed from the first her talent. She read widely, and she inherited from her mother a passionate love for Virginia and its history-a love that evolved significantly in her work.

Greene was educated at home by her mother and at the Tuscaloosa Female College, which she attended two years, leaving school at age of 16.

She moved to Birmingham with her parents after leaving school.

== Career ==
=== Teacher and librarian ===
From Birmingham, Greene went with the family to Montgomery, Alabama, where she taught almost immediately after her school days. While teaching in a mining town in north Alabama, she conceived the idea of writing sketches for publication. Her first attempt, "Yankees in Dixie," was published in the Philadelphia Times. Her talent was recognized from the beginning by editors, and their encouragement stimulated her desire to write. She contributed to that paper many letters on southern affairs. She also wrote for the Birmingham Age-Herald and other southern papers. Besides writing in prose, she sometimes wrote verse.

Greene taught for years, principally in Montgomery public schools. In 1906, while serving as principal of the Capitol Hill School in Montgomery, Greene was named as temporary secretary of the Alabama State Department of Archives and History.

In 1907, (Note: According to Owen (1921), in 1909, Greene resigned her position as principal of the Lafayette public school and started her job as assistant in the library division of the Alabama State department of archives and history. As journals dating 1907 record the year 1907, the 1909 date appears to be an error.) Greene resigned as a teacher to become Assistant in charge of Library Extension, Department of Archives and History, in Montgomery, a position she held for one year. In recognition of her ability, she was elected secretary of the Alabama Library Association.

From 1911 to 1912, Greene edited the woman's page of The Birmingham News, and the following year, became director of the Birmingham Public Library.

=== Author ===
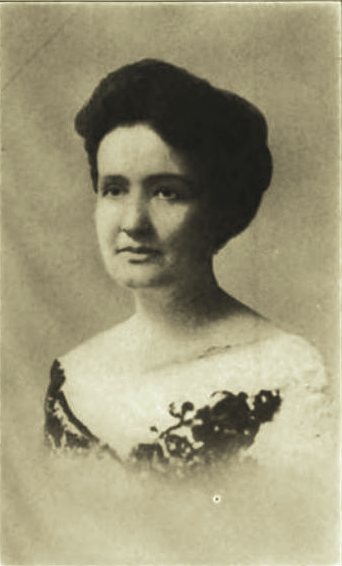
(1913)

Greene returned to Montgomery in 1913, and thereafter devoted her time to writing.

Greene's first novel, Into the Night, published by the Crowells, was a story of modern New Orleans, dealing with a Mafia mystery. It was her first long piece of fiction, and its success was immediate. Other novels, The Right of the Strongest, One Clear Call, The Devil to Pay, followed in quick succession, all published by Scribner's. All her fiction was popular. The field of the novel never engaged Greene's entire interest. It was only one phase of her literary expression. She also wrote books for young people" King Arthur's Court, and With Spurs of Gold.

Versatile as she was -novelist, playwright, journalist, poet- the phase of her work in literature that stood out pre-eminently was that of her books for children. In these books, her determination to develop patriotism in the mind of the child becomes clear. This vision was intensified by the years of the American Civil War, as the titles of other published books showed: My Country's Voice, America First, and American Ideals.

She was already most favorably known in the field of children's literature by King Arthur's Court, a book which was favorably received as soon as it was published, and which held its place with honor for more than a decade. Through this book, thousands of children became familiar with the Arthurian legends. The popularity of this book was so great that Greene and her cousin, Dolly Williams Kirk, whose poems had magazine publication, brought out in collaboration, a volume of stories of chivalry, With Spurs of Gold. This book received high praise from readers, and was used in college courses.

Viewed as a synthetic whole, and taken in conjunction with her earlier books on chivalry, the scope of her series of readers, American Ideals, was of an educative value beyond anything ever done before in this line. This series, published by Scribner's, contained in the 'Colonial' volume, a chapter, "Virginia and the Ideal of Civil Liberty", which presented the history of Virginia.

Later, Greene collaborated with her sister, Annie Greene Brown, on a volume of short stories.

Some of Greene's novels were adapted into films. Months of negotiation were required before Louis B. Mayer obtained the film rights to the Greene book, One Clear Call, as arrangements had already been made for its production on the theater stage. A record price secured the dramatic rights to the book for the screen, which was adapted to the screen by Bess Meredyth, and was released in 1922 The Right of the Strongest was adapted to the screen by Doty Hobart, and released in 1924. It is a drama of the Alabama hillbillies and their struggle to retain their rights as squatters.

In 1927, Greene taught short story writing in Birmingham. All Night Long (1929), a comedy in three acts, was accepted by the Walter Baker Company in 1929. In 1937, she co-authored The Last Enemy, a three-act play, with Robert H. Greene.

== Personal life ==
In politics, she was a Democrat, and in religion, an Episcopalian. She was reared by Methodist parents in the Methodist church, but in Birmingham, she joined the Protestant Episcopal church. In 1922, Greene made an unsuccessful run for a seat on the Alabama State Democratic Executive Committee. She delivered an address on behalf of the Democratic ticket in 1928.

Unmarried, Greene divided her time between New York City and her brother's home in Montgomery.

Frances Nimmo Greene died in Birmingham, Alabama, December 9, 1937. (Note: According to VIAF, Geene died in 1921.)

== Selected publications ==
=== Children's literature ===
American Ideals

Legends of King Arthur and his court

My country's voice

- Legends of King Arthur and His Court (Ginn and Co., Boston, 1901) (text)
- With spurs of gold; heroes of chivalry and their deeds (with Dolly Williams Kirk; Little, Brown and Co., Boston, 1905) (text)
- Heroes of Chivalry and Their Deeds (with Dolly Williams Kirk; 1910) (text)
- America First (Scribner's, New York, 1918) (text)
- My Country's Voice (Scribner's, New York, 1918) (text)
- American Ideals: A Series of Readers for Schools (Scribner's, New York, 1920-1922) (text, book 5; text, book 6)

=== Short stories ===
- "Yankees in Dixie" (no later than 1893)

=== Novels ===
The right of the strongest

- Into the night, a story of New Orleans (Scribner's, New York, 1909) (text)
- The Right of the Strongest (Scribner's, New York, 1913) (text)
- One Clear Call (Scribner's, New York, 1914) (text)
- The devil to pay (Scribner's, New York, 1917) (text)

=== Plays ===
- The Ultimate American: A Comedy (1913)
- Speaking of Adam: A Comedy in Three Acts (1915)
- All Night Long (1929)
- The Last Enemy (with Robert H. Greene; 1937)

== Filmography ==
Films based on Greene's novels:

- The Devil to Pay (1920)
- One Clear Call (1922)
- The Right of the Strongest (1924)
