= Christina (1929 film) =

1929 film

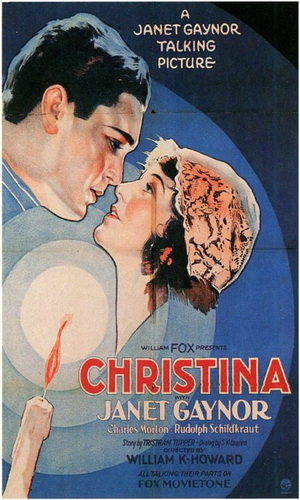
- Film poster
- Directed by: William K. Howard
- Written by: Tristram TupperFox Film CorporationMarion Orth
- Starring: Janet Gaynor; Charles Morton
- Cinematography: Lucien Andriot
- Edited by: Harry H. Caldwell; Katherine Hilliker
- Distributed by: Fox Film Corporation
- Release date: December 15, 1929
- Running time: 85 min.
- Country: United States
- Languages: Sound (Part-Talkie); English Intertitles

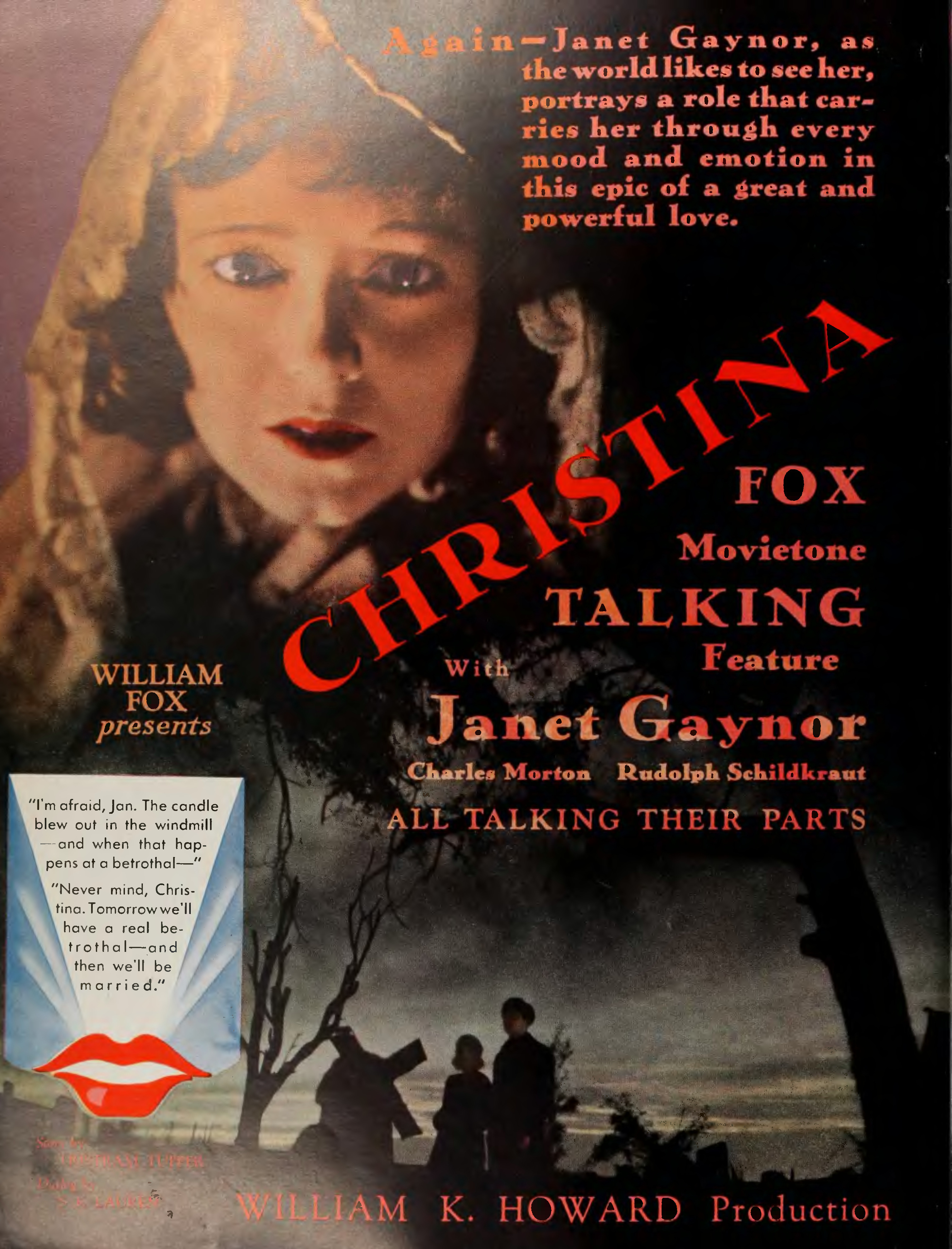
Christina ad in The Film Daily, 1929

Christina is a lost 1929 sound part talkie starring Janet Gaynor and directed by William K. Howard. The supporting cast includes Charles Morton, Rudolph Schildkraut, Harry Cording, and Lucy Doraine. In addition to sequences with audible dialogue or talking sequences, the film features a synchronized musical score and sound effects along with English intertitles. The soundtrack was recorded using the Movietone sound-on-film system. The dialogue sequence was placed at the very end of the film and lasted seventeen minutes long according to Variety.

== Cast ==
- Janet Gaynor as Christina
- Charles Morton as Jan
- Rudolph Schildkraut as Niklaas
- Harry Cording as Dick Torpe
- Lucy Doraine as Madame Bosman

== Music ==
The film featured a theme song entitled "Christina" which was composed by Con Conrad, Archie Gottler and Sidney D. Mitchell.

== See also ==
- List of early sound feature films (1926–1929)
