= One Clear Call (film) =

1922 film by John M. Stahl

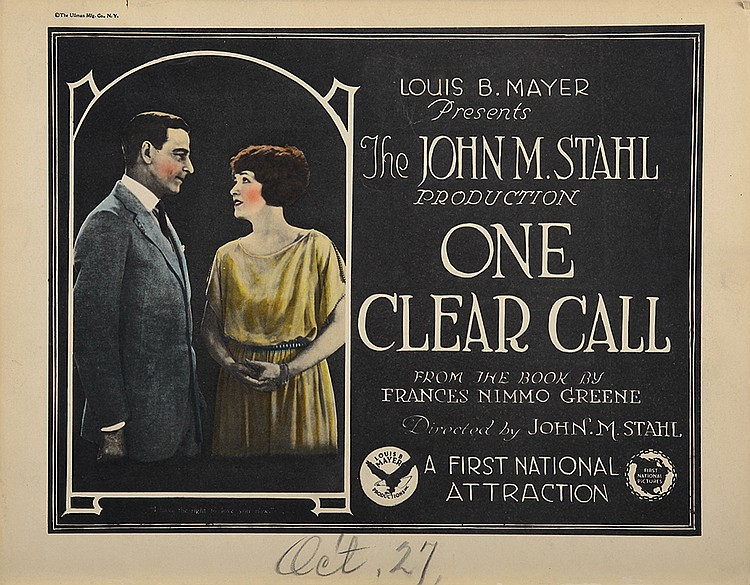
- Lobby card
- Directed by: John M. Stahl
- Written by: Bess Meredyth
- Based on: One Clear Call by Frances Nimmo Greene
- Produced by: Louis B. Mayer
- Starring: Milton Sills; Claire Windsor; Irene Rich
- Cinematography: Ernest Palmer
- Edited by: Madge Tyrone
- Production company: Louis B. Mayer Productions
- Distributed by: First National Pictures
- Release date: May 20, 1922
- Running time: 80 minutes
- Country: United States
- Language: Silent (English intertitles)

One Clear Call is a surviving 1922 American silent drama film directed by John M. Stahl and starring Milton Sills, Claire Windsor, and Irene Rich.

== Plot ==
As described in a film magazine, Dr. Alan Hamilton takes an unusual interest in Faith, a young woman who has been admitted to the hospital after fainting. Faith recovers and stays in a cottage near the doctor's home, but her identity remains a mystery.

Dr. Hamilton proposes to her, but learns that she is already married, and the mystery of her husband arouses his curiosity. One of the doctor's other patients is Henry Garnett, the proprietor of a café in town called "The Owl", which is a notorious dance hall and bar.

Citizens of the town that are members of a Ku Klux Klan-like group attack Garnett's café, but the doctor dissuades them after telling them that Garnett has perhaps 30 days to live due to an ailment. Garnett then confesses that he has stolen the property of a close friend that was entrusted to him for the friend's daughter, Helen Ware, and he wants to make restitution. Garnett finds Helen in his dance hall, but she turns from him, preferring the gay life. Garnett decides to close his place.

Disappointed in love, Dr. Hamilton has started to drink excessively. Then he is called upon to save the child of his sister Maggie Thornton, who has fallen and cut himself severely with glass. The operation is successful. Faith seeks out her husband, who is Garnett, but he takes poison. This leaves Faith to seek happiness with the doctor.

== Cast ==
- Milton Sills as Dr. Alan Hamilton
- Claire Windsor as Faith
- Henry B. Walthall as Henry Garnett
- Irene Rich as Maggie Thornton
- Stanley Goethals as Sonny Thornton
- William Marion as Tom Thornton
- Joseph J. Dowling as Colonel Garnett
- Edith Yorke as Mother Garnett
- Doris Pawn as Phyllis Howard
- Donald MacDonald as Dr. Bailey
- Shannon Day as Helen, Jim Ware's Daughter
- Annette DeFoe as Yetta
- Fred Kelsey as Starnes
- Albert MacQuarrie as Jim Holbrook
- Nick Cogley as Toby

== Preservation ==
A copy of One Clear Call is in the George Eastman House Motion Picture Collection.

== Bibliography ==
- Munden, Kenneth White. The American Film Institute Catalog of Motion Pictures Produced in the United States, Part 1. University of California Press, 1997.
