= The Awakening (1928 film) =

1928 film

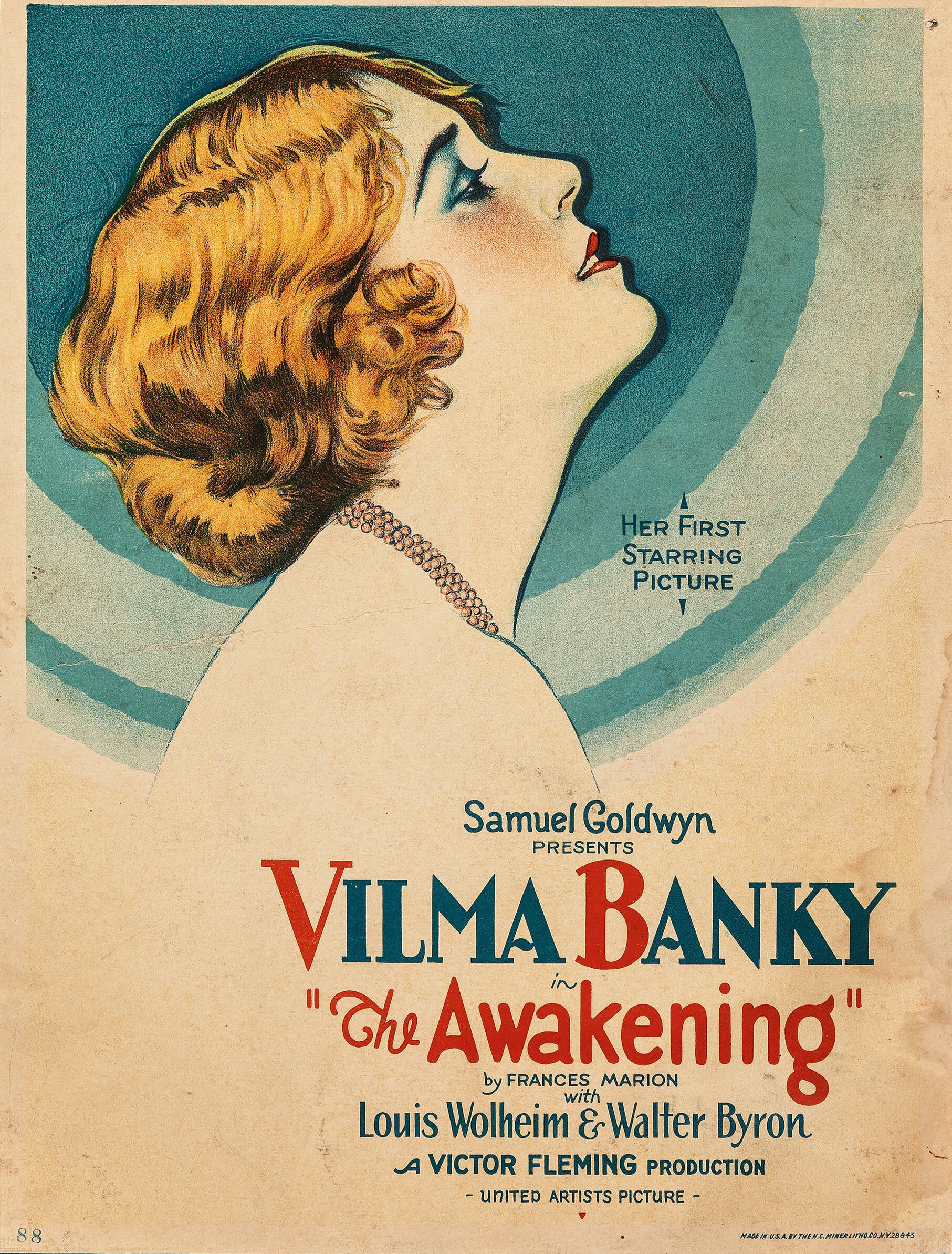
- Film poster
- Directed by: Victor Fleming
- Written by: Carey Wilson (screenplay); Frances Marion (story)
- Produced by: Samuel Goldwyn
- Starring: Vilma Bánky; Walter Byron
- Cinematography: George Barnes
- Edited by: Viola Lawrence; Katherine Hilliker; H. H. Caldwell
- Music by: Hugo Riesenfeld; Irving Berlin (song "Marie")
- Production company: Samuel Goldwyn Productions
- Distributed by: United Artists
- Release date: November 17, 1928
- Running time: 90 minutes
- Country: United States
- Languages: Sound (Synchronized); English Intertitles

The Awakening is a 1928 American synchronized sound feature film directed by Victor Fleming and starring Vilma Bánky. While the film has no audible dialog, it was released with a synchronized musical score with sound effects using both the sound-on-disc and sound-on-film process. The film was based on a story by Frances Marion.

== Plot ==
In the quiet Alsatian village of Pré d'Or, just before the outbreak of the Great War, lives Marie Ducrot, a beautiful and virtuous young woman, the admired belle of the village. Despite the attentions of many local suitors, Marie remains unattached. Among her admirers is Le Bête, the wealthiest farmer in the region, whose clumsy courtship is favored by Grandfather Ducrot, Marie’s guardian. Yet Marie grants him little more than a polite smile.

On the eve of the village’s annual festival, a regiment of Uhlans arrives on fall maneuvers, led by the dashing and aristocratic Lieutenant Count Karl von Hagen, a charming officer known for trifling with women’s affections. When Marie's flock of sheep delays the progress of his squadron, von Hagen notices her and resolves to make her his latest conquest.

At the festival the next day, von Hagen boldly flirts with Marie, inciting jealousy in Le Bête. Marie rejects the officer’s advances when he grows too presumptuous, but her resolve falters soon after. Regretful, she agrees to see him privately. Within a week, as von Hagen prepares to leave for Africa—a posting he expects to be fatal—Marie has fallen deeply in love with him. For von Hagen, the affair had begun as a mere amusement, but Marie’s sincerity unsettles him.

When Le Bête, seething with jealousy, confronts von Hagen at the village inn and threatens him, the officer coolly dismisses the challenge with disdain. Later, von Hagen tells Marie that if her love is true, she will come to him that night to say goodbye. Marie battles with fear, passion, and the threat of village gossip—but when the morning bugle sounds, she can resist no longer.

A village gossip sees Marie entering von Hagen’s lodgings and spreads word of her supposed fall from grace. A mob forms, led by the enraged Le Bête. Inside, Marie is overcome with emotion and submits to Karl, who, struck by her purity and devotion, realizes he truly loves her. Knowing he has acted selfishly, he asks her to leave before harm comes to her.

Outside, the villagers lie in wait. As Marie emerges, Le Bête viciously whips her through the rain back to her cottage. There, she finds her home defaced with tar as a mark of disgrace—and her beloved grandfather dead in his chair, overcome by the shame.

By morning, it is assumed that Marie has taken her own life.

Years pass. War has engulfed Alsace. Now promoted to Captain, von Hagen returns near Pré d'Or to warn a convent of nuns of the approaching French advance. To his astonishment, among the sisters he finds Marie—alive, cloistered, and a novice. Though she has not yet taken final vows, she turns away from his renewed declaration of love, having found solace in the peace of religious life.

The next day, von Hagen returns to help evacuate the convent, but he is severely wounded. Marie, though shell-shocked herself, tends to him. While fetching water, the French army arrives, led by Sergeant Le Bête, now half-mad from war and still carrying the bitter scars of his past with von Hagen.

Finding the officer unconscious in the convent chapel, Le Bête recognizes his old enemy and, in a moment of vengeance, rips away his bandages to let him bleed to death. He settles down to watch the life ebb from von Hagen.

Marie returns to the chapel and finds them. Le Bête, shocked to see her alive, realizes she still loves von Hagen. In a sudden act of redemption, he resolves to save them both. He hides the wounded officer and Marie beneath straw in a peasant cart, takes the reins himself, and drives furiously toward the German lines.

Though hit by sniper fire along the way, Le Bête delivers them to safety—dying with a triumphant laugh at the bewildered von Hagen. The war has cost him everything, but in his last act he redeems himself.

Marie and von Hagen are left together at last, their love deepened by suffering and finally secure in peace.

== Cast ==
- Vilma Bánky as Marie Ducrot
- Walter Byron as Count Karl von Hagen
- Louis Wolheim as Le Bete
- George Davis as The Orderly
- William Orlamond as Grandfather Ducrot
- Carl von Haartman as Lieutenant Franz Geyer

== Reception ==
The film featured a theme song entitled "Marie" with music and lyrics by Irving Berlin.

== Reception ==
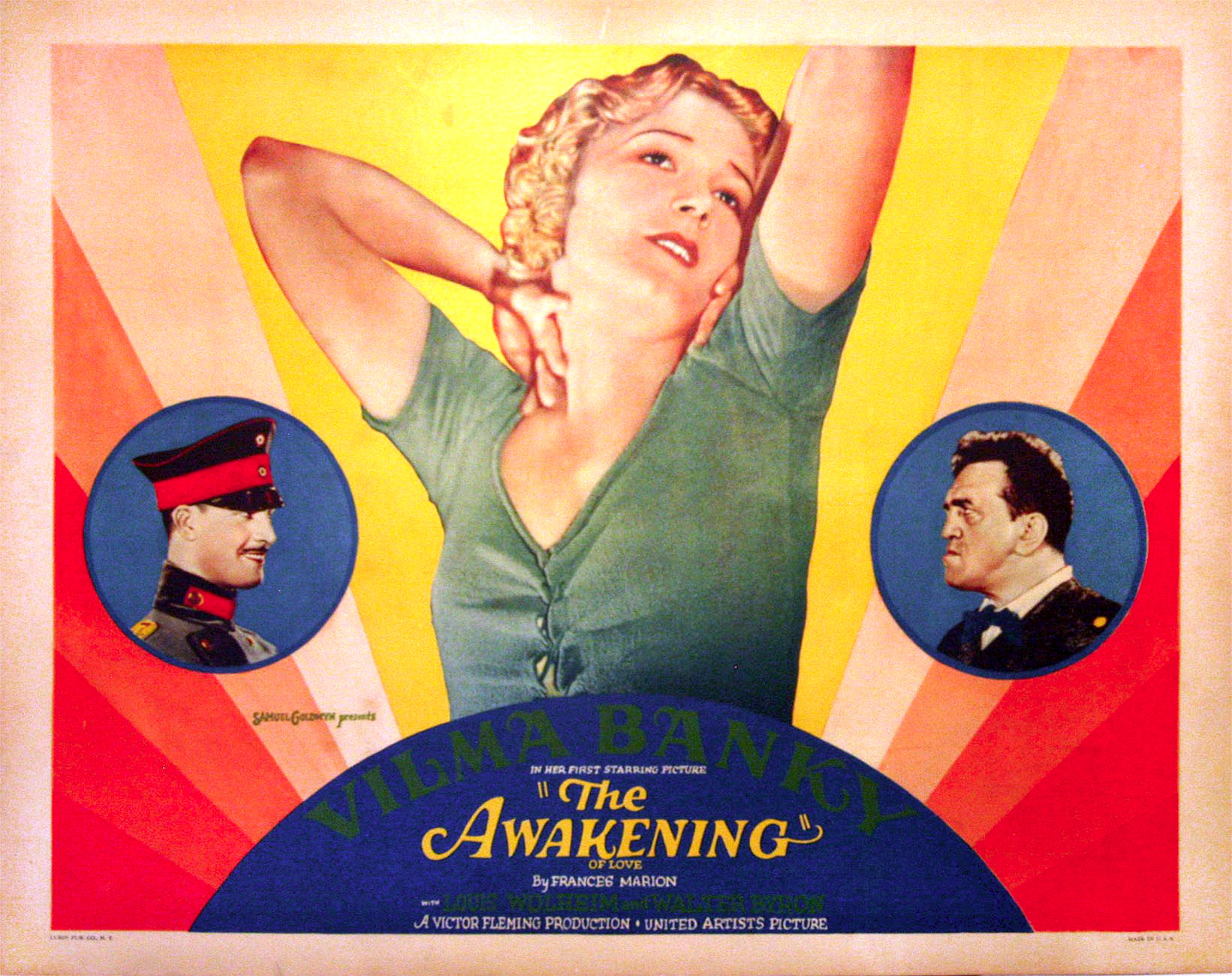
The Awakening poster, 1928

The film was nominated for the Academy Award for Best Production Design at the 2nd Academy Awards. The Nominee, William Cameron Menzies was also nominated the same year for the film Alibi.

=== Critical reception ===
A review in the trade publication Harrison's Reports summarized the film as "'spotty;' that is, it is good, in fact very good, in spots; on the other hand, in spots it is slow, and even poor." It also commended Banky and Byron for "good work" in their roles and Fleming for his direction.

== Preservation ==
One reel of the film (approximately 1000 feet of 35mm nitrate film) survives at the BFI.

== See also ==
- List of early sound feature films (1926–1929)
