= The Devil's Circus =

1926 film

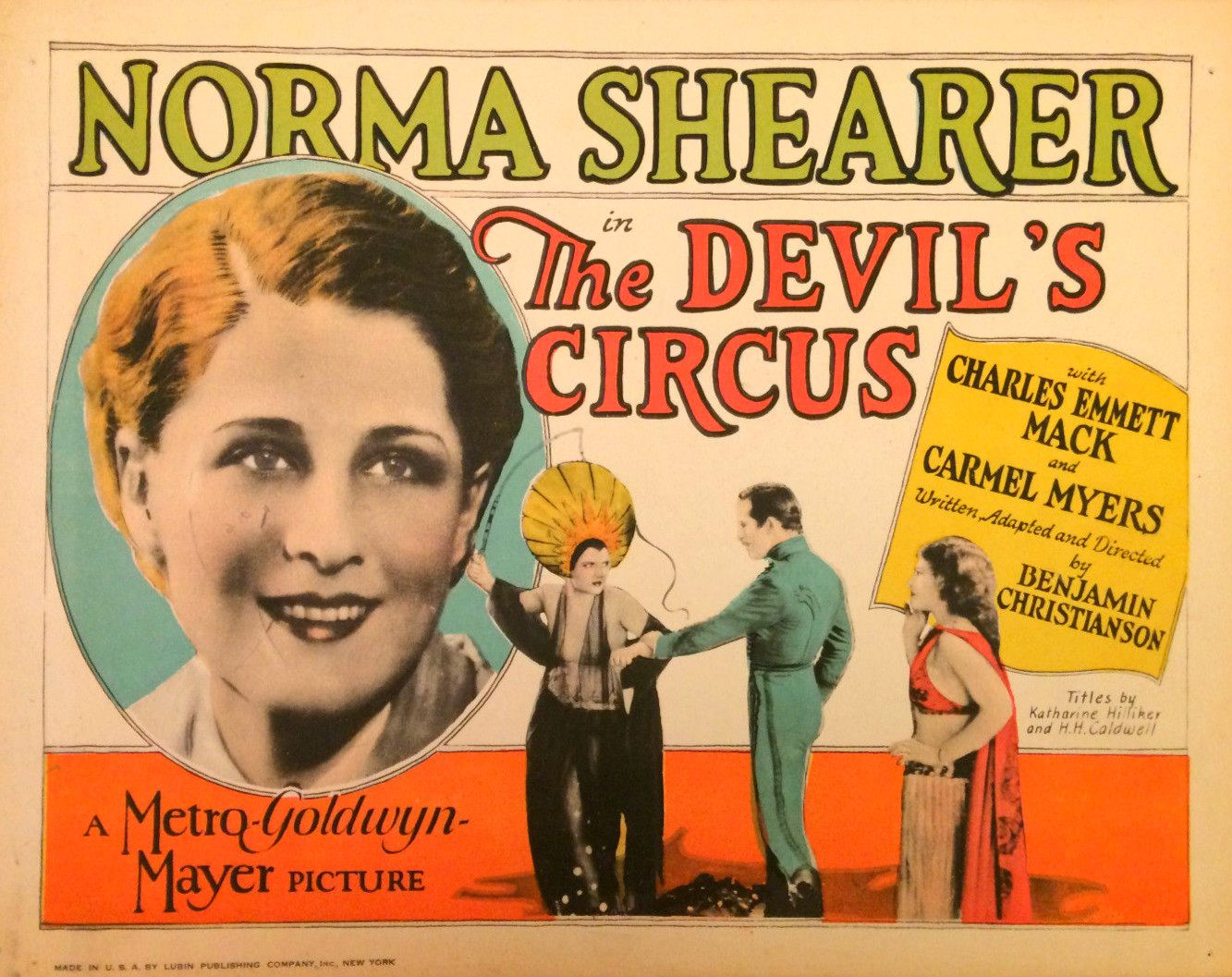
- Lobby card
- Directed by: Benjamin Christensen
- Written by: Benjamin Christensen; H.H. Caldwell (titles); Katherine Hilliker (titles)
- Starring: Norma Shearer; Charles Emmett Mack
- Cinematography: Ben F. Reynolds
- Edited by: Ben Lewis
- Distributed by: Metro-Goldwyn-Mayer
- Release date: February 15, 1926
- Running time: 70 minutes
- Country: United States
- Language: Silent (English intertitles)

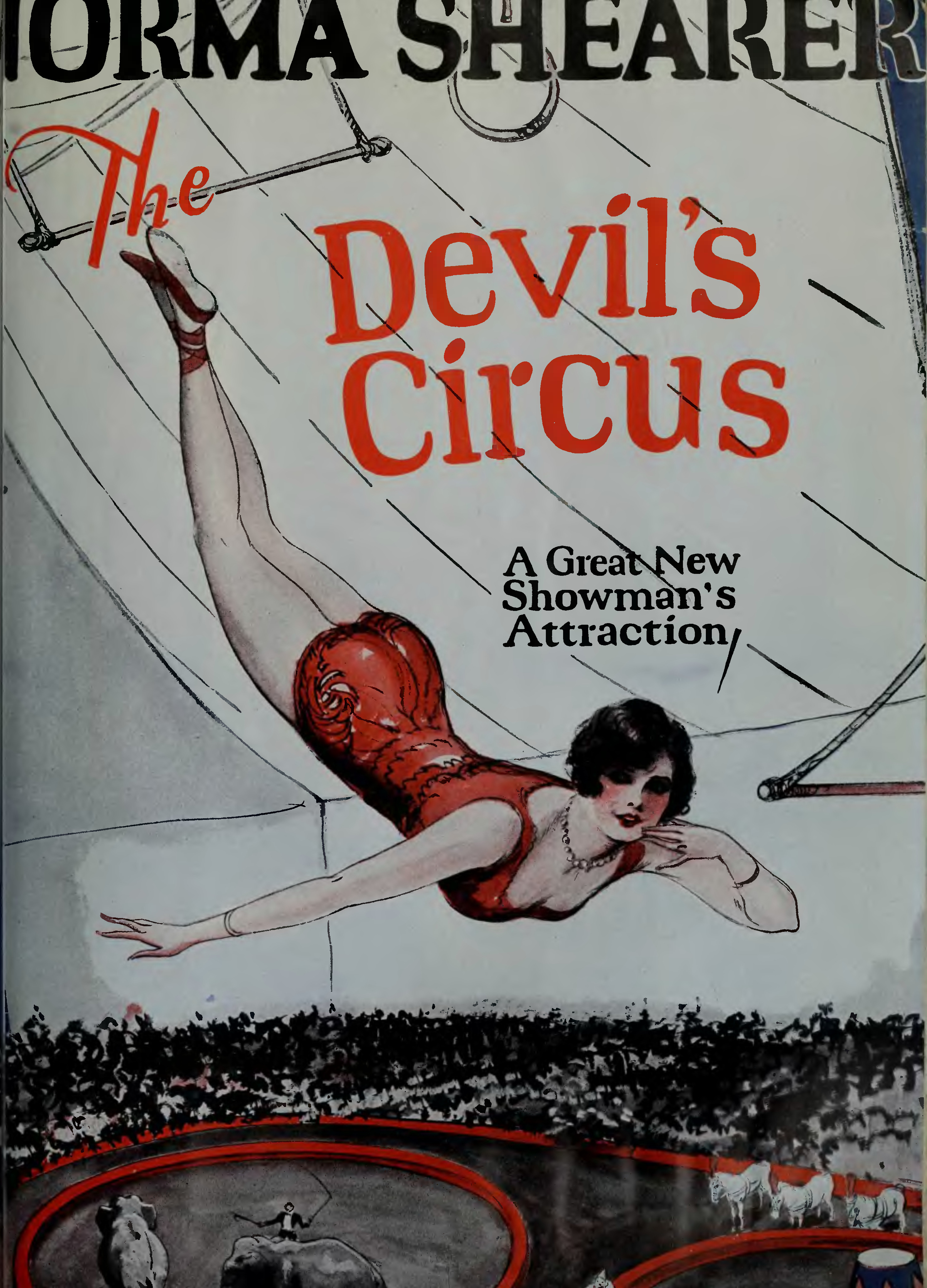
The Devil's Circus advertisement in The Film Daily (1926)

The Devil's Circus is a 1926 American silent drama film directed by Danish director Benjamin Christensen, based upon his screenplay. The film stars Norma Shearer and Charles Emmett Mack. It was the first of seven films directed by Christensen in the United States, and one of only four of those films that have not been lost. The film involves a young female trapeze artist who is in love with a pickpocket.

The film's sets were designed by the art director James Basevi.

== Plot ==
As described in a film magazine review, Mary, a young country woman, is befriended by Carl, a pickpocket. She obtains employment in a circus. Carl is arrested for robbery but promises Mary to go straight thereafter. Hugo, a lion-tamer who is infatuated with Mary, assaults her. Jealousy impels Yonna, Hugo's mistress, to tamper with the ropes while Mary is doing her trapeze act. She falls among the enraged lions and is crippled. War breaks out, and many circus men leave to serve in the military. When peace comes, Carl searches and finds Mary. He goes to kill Hugo, but, after discovering that he is blind, he relents. Carl and Mary face a happy future together.

== Cast ==
- Norma Shearer as Mary
- Charles Emmett Mack as Carl
- Carmel Myers as Yonna
- John Miljan as Lieberkind
- Claire McDowell as Mrs. Peterson
- Joyce Coad as Little Anita
- Margie Angus as Ring Entrance Helper at Accident Circus Act (uncredited)
- Mary Angus as Ring Entrance Helper at Accident Circus Act (uncredited)
- Charles Becker as Midget in Circus (uncredited)
- Sidney Bracey as Spiro (uncredited)
- Melva Cornell as Undetermined Secondary Role (uncredited)
- Karl Dane as Clown standing with Midget (uncredited)
- Charles Murray as Lieberkind's Assistant (uncredited)
- Mack Swain as Sultan in Circus Act (uncredited)
- William H. Tooker as Priest (uncredited)

== Reception ==
From users of IMDb, the film has received a score of 6.8 out 10 from 62 votes.

== Preservation status ==
Thought to have been lost, a print of The Devil's Circus was rediscovered and has been preserved by the George Eastman Museum. Funding for the film's restoration was provided by The Film Foundation.
