= The Right of the Strongest (film) =

1924 film

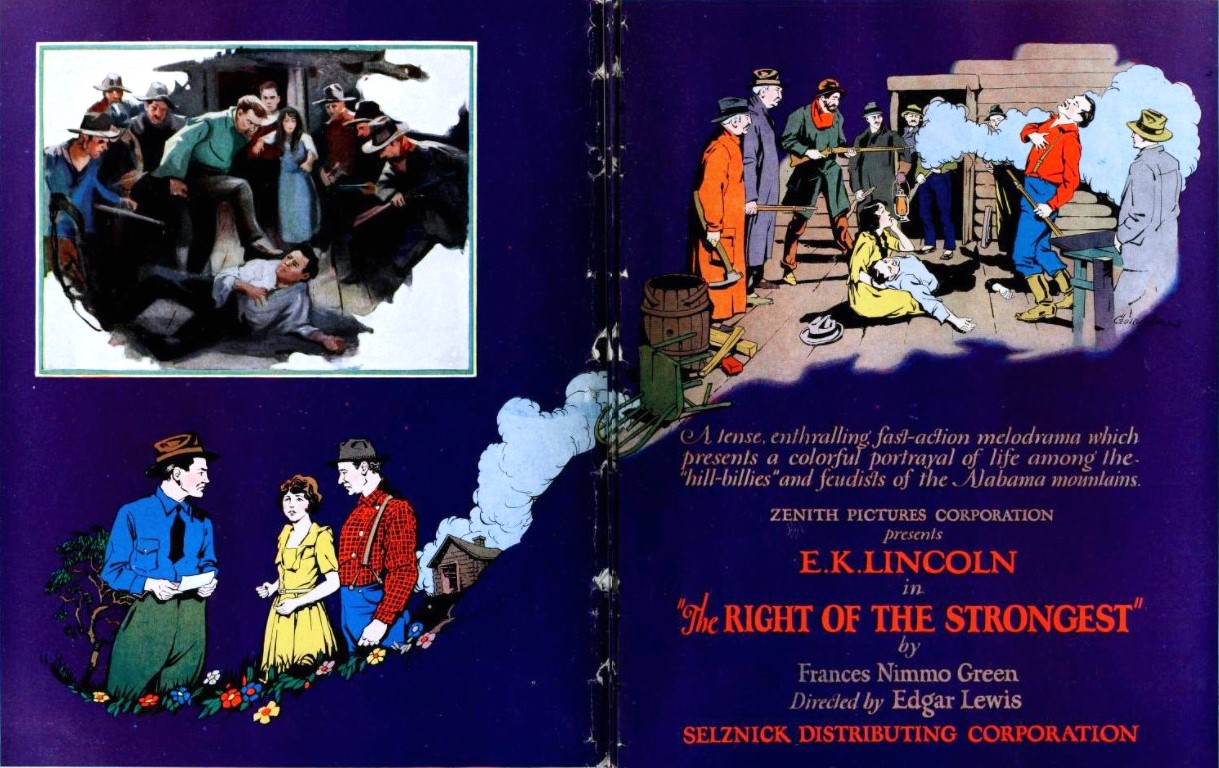
- Advertisement
- Directed by: Edgar Lewis
- Written by: H.H. Caldwell; Frances Nimmo Greene; Katherine Hilliker; Doty Hobart
- Starring: E.K. Lincoln; Helen Ferguson; George Siegmann
- Cinematography: Vernon L. Walker
- Production company: Zenith Pictures
- Distributed by: Selznick Pictures
- Release date: April 1924
- Running time: 70 minutes
- Country: United States
- Language: Silent (English intertitles)

The Right of the Strongest is a 1924 American silent drama film directed by Edgar Lewis and starring E.K. Lincoln, Helen Ferguson, and George Siegmann. It was adapted from a 1913 novel of the same name by Frances Nimmo Greene.

== Plot ==
As described in a film magazine review, John Marshall, young engineer, goes to Bullis Valley in the Alabama hills to secure lands for a big power project. The hill folks think he is a revenue spy and plans are laid against his life. He is in love with a school teacher, Mary Dale. Her father was previously slain by the hill squatters when they suspected him of plying the trade of government informant. She struggles through a storm to reach his cabin to warn him. A lynching party, headed by Trav Williams arrives. Williams and Marshall agree to fight it out and battle furiously. Marshall's men from the construction camp rush to their chief's rescue. He weds Mary.

== Cast ==
- E.K. Lincoln as John Marshall
- Helen Ferguson as Mary Elizabeth Dale
- Robert Milasch as Bud Davis
- F.B. Phillips as 'Uncle Beck' Logan
- Tully Marshall as 'Mister' Sykes
- James Gibson as 'Shan' Thaggin
- Coy Watson as Tony Thaggin
- Gertrude Norman as Aunt Millie Davis
- Milla Davenport as Melissa Thaggin
- June Elvidge as Anna Bell Lee
- Winter Hall as Austin Lee Sr.
- Niles Welch as Austin Jr.
- Beth Kosick as Sue Thaggin
- Tom London as Fred Dearing

== Censorship ==
Before The Right of the Strongest could be exhibited in Kansas, the Kansas Board of Review required the removal of several scenes in reel 4. Eliminations were of a noose being fixed, an intertitle saying "To hell with you," and a man being choked, stamped, and kicked during a fight.

== Preservation ==
With no prints of The Right of the Strongest located in any film archives, it is a lost film.

== Bibliography ==
- Rainey, Buck. Sweethearts of the Sage: Biographies and Filmographies of 258 Actresses Appearing in Western Movies. McFarland & Company, 1992.
