= The Right of the Strongest (novel) =

1913 novel by Frances Nimmo Greene

- Author: Frances Nimmo Greene
- Language: English
- Genre: Novel
- Set in: Alabama
- Publisher: Charles Scribner's Sons
- Publication date: 1913
- Publication place: United States
- Pages: 401
- OCLC: 1157190521
- Website: https://archive.org/details/rightofstrongest00greeiala
- Film adaptation, The Right of the Strongest (1924)

The Right of the Strongest is a novel by Frances Nimmo Greene, published by Charles Scribner's Sons, New York, 1913. It was adapted into a film of the same name.

== Main characters ==
- Mary Elizabeth Dale is a young school teacher who has been educated by a philanthropist on the understanding that she go back to her people in the mountains of Alabama and devote her life to them.
- John Marshall, a self-willed, clear-sighted financier, comes to the mountain community where Mary Elizabeth is teaching for the purpose of acquiring land for a money making project.

== Plot ==
The story is set in a rugged mountain-rimmed valley of Alabama. It is a story of mountain feuds, and of a modern business scheme that involved buying up the squatters' patches of land that belong by right only to the strongest. John Marshall has a vision of the whole valley in which this group of mountain dwellers live being converted into a reservoir for all-round-the-year usage, for the generation of electric power to run a yet unbuilt city twenty miles away, where two yet unbuilt railroads shall cross to carry away the steel that is yet to be mined and melted and moulded. The valley dwellers resent this invasion of the outer world, and John Marshall, falling in love with Mary Elizabeth, who has dedicated her life to educating these people, finds in her idealism and Puritanism a stubbornness of misunderstanding and harsh judgment that makes the conflict between love and business a fierce one. He discovers that her father was not a traitor to his people, and that the "bad man" of the book was the real villain. Finally, he gives up the secrets of his fight for modernising this region in order that Mary Elizabeth, by warning her people against him, may convince the native dwellers of her devotion to any cause that is theirs. But he fights on and finally prevails on the last man who holds out to sell his land. From the others whose titles are defective, he merely takes it. The final chapters of the book are taken up with Mary Elizabeth's pleadings for the rights of the valley dwellers to the homes of their fathers in the face of his implacable vision of civilising the community at whatever cost to the few. There is the final stand of the people against Marshall, the battle in which he is desperately wounded, and finally, the temporary triumph of the ideal over the material in Mary Elizabeth's order for the freeing of the "hillites" before the sheriff and his posse reach them. John Marshall lies a very sick man as she puts her hand over his mouth and gives this order, to which, perforce, he subscribes.

== Major themes ==
The novel is a broadly human story written from the heart. The author gets very close to the mountain people and her descriptions of their life are graphic and often moving, but no minor detail is allowed to hamper the forward swing of the plot, progress at any cost to the individuals.
