= The Loves of Carmen (1927 film) =

1927 film by Raoul Walsh

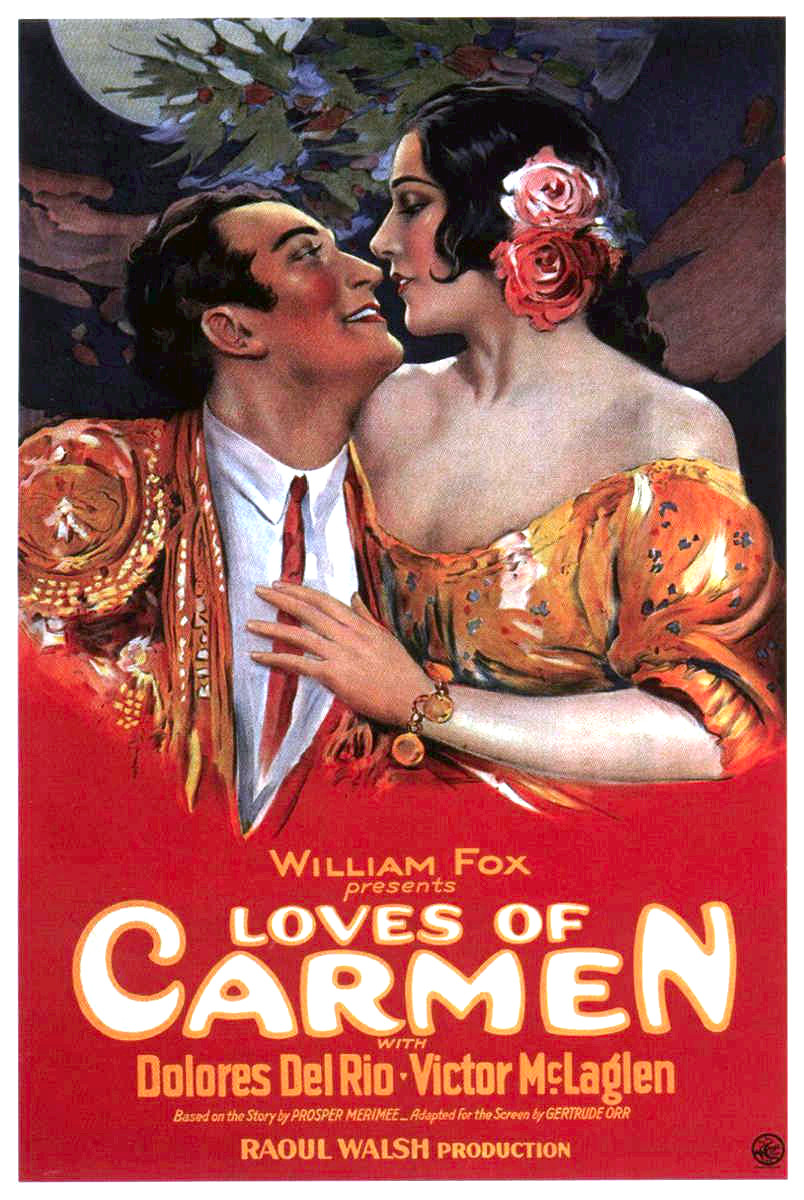
- Theatrical release poster
- Directed by: Raoul Walsh
- Written by: Harry H. Caldwell (titles); Katherine Hilliker (titles); Gertrude Orr
- Based on: Carmen; 1845 novella by Prosper Mérimée
- Produced by: William Fox
- Starring: Dolores del Río; Don Alvarado
- Cinematography: Lucien N. Andriot
- Edited by: Harry H. Caldwell; Katherine Hilliker
- Distributed by: Fox Film Corporation
- Release date: September 4, 1927 (United States)
- Running time: 90 minutes
- Country: United States
- Languages: Silent Version; Sound Version (Synchronized) (English intertitles)

The Loves of Carmen is a 1927 American silent romantic drama film directed by Raoul Walsh. The film, based on the novella Carmen by Prosper Mérimée, stars Dolores del Río in the title role, and Don Alvarado as Jose. Due to the public apathy towards silent films, a sound version was also prepared in 1928. While the sound version has no audible dialog, it was released with a synchronized musical score with sound effects using both the sound-on-disc and sound-on-film process.

== Plot ==
The full film

== Cast ==
- Dolores del Río as Carmen
- Don Alvarado as Jose
- Victor McLaglen as Escamillo
- Mathilde Comont as Emilia
- Fred Kohler as Gypsy Chief
- Nancy Nash as Michaela
- Jack Baston as Morales
- Carmen Costello as Teresa
- Rafael Valverde as Miguel

== Music ==
The sound version of the film featured a theme song entitled “Estrellita” by Manuel M. Ponce, arranged by George P. Hulten, with English lyrics by George Gibson Davis.

== Preservation ==
A print of The Loves of Carmen was restored by the Museum of Modern Art and The Film Foundation, and is also held by Cinematek.
