= No Other Woman (1928 film) =

1928 film

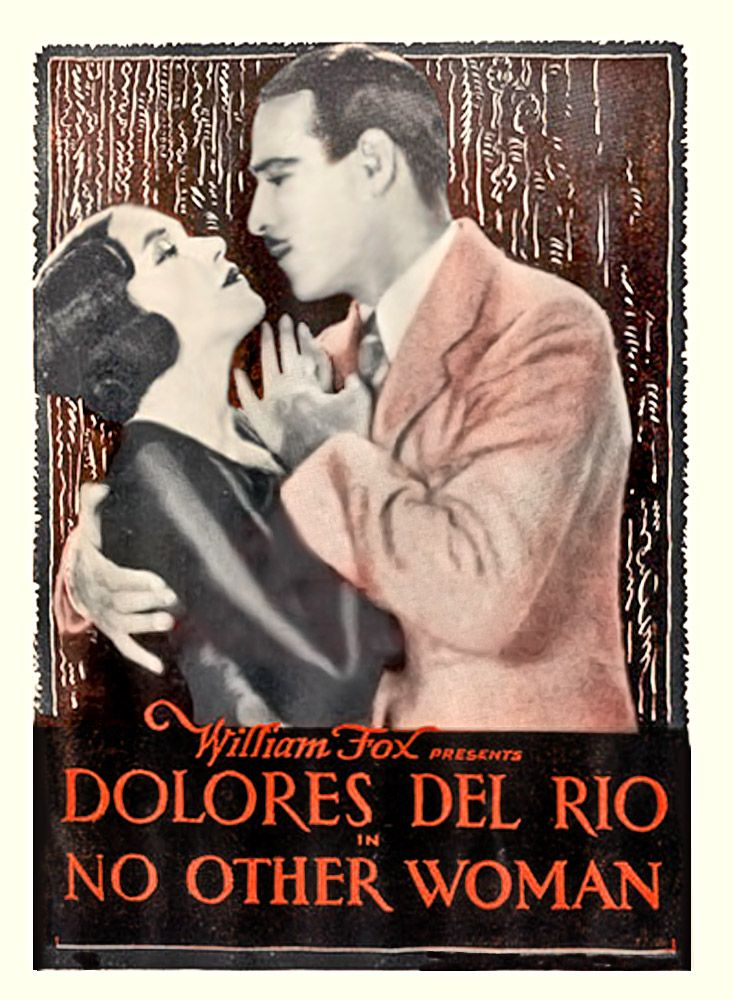
- Theatrical poster
- Directed by: Lou Tellegen
- Written by: Polan Banks; Jessie Burns; Harry H. Caldwell; Bernard Vorhaus
- Produced by: William Fox
- Starring: Dolores del Río; Don Alvarado; Ben Bard
- Cinematography: Paul Ivano; Ernest Palmer
- Edited by: J. Edwin Robbins
- Music by: Hugo Riesenfeld
- Distributed by: Fox Film Corporation
- Release date: June 10, 1928
- Running time: 56 minutes
- Country: United States
- Language: Silent (English intertitles)

No Other Woman is a 1928 American silent drama film directed by Lou Tellegen and starring Dolores del Río. It was released by Fox Film Corporation on June 10, 1928.

== Cast ==
- Dolores del Río as Carmelita de Granados
- Don Alvarado as Maurice
- Ben Bard as Albert
- Paulette Duval as Mafalda
- Rosita Marstini as Carmelita's Aunt
- André Lanoy as Grand Duke Sergey

== Preservation status ==
No Other Woman is considered to be a lost film with no archival prints preserved.

== See also ==
- 1937 Fox vault fire
