= Craig's Wife (film) =

Craig's Wife is the title of two films based on the play of the same name:

- Craig's Wife (1928 film), a silent film starring Irene Rich, Warner Baxter and Virginia Bradford
- Craig's Wife (1936 film), starring Rosalind Russell and John Boles

== See also ==
- Harriet Craig, another film adaptation of the play
