= Men Are Like That =

1930 film

- Directed by: Frank Tuttle
- Screenplay by: George Kelly (play, "The Show-Off"); Herman J. Mankiewicz; Marion Dix
- Starring: Hal Skelly; Doris Hill; Clara Blandick; Charles Sellon; Helene Chadwick; Morgan Farley; George Fawcett
- Cinematography: Archie Stout
- Edited by: Verna Willis
- Music by: W. Franke Harling
- Production company: Paramount Pictures
- Distributed by: Paramount Pictures
- Release date: March 22, 1930
- Running time: 59 minutes
- Country: United States
- Language: English

Men Are Like That is a 1930 American pre-Code drama film directed by Frank Tuttle and written by Herman J. Mankiewicz and Marion Dix, based on the George Kelly play The Show-Off, which had already been the source material for a 1926 silent film and which would subsequently be remade in 1934 and 1946. Men Are Like That stars Hal Skelly, Doris Hill, Clara Blandick, Charles Sellon, Helene Chadwick, Morgan Farley and George Fawcett. The film was released on March 22, 1930, by Paramount Pictures.

== Plot ==
Men Are Like That (1930)

== Cast ==
- Hal Skelly as J. Aubrey Piper
- Doris Hill as Amy Fisher
- Clara Blandick as Ma Fisher
- Charles Sellon as Pa Fisher
- Helene Chadwick as Clara Hyland
- Morgan Farley as Joe Fisher
- George Fawcett as The Judge
- William B. Davidson as Frank Hyland
- Eugene Pallette as Traffic Cop

== Preservation status ==
- It is preserved in the Library of Congress collection.
