= The Show-Off (1926 film) =

1926 film by Malcolm St. Clair

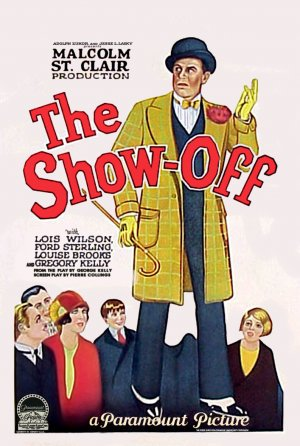
- Theatrical poster
- Directed by: Malcolm St. Clair
- Written by: George Kelly (play); Pierre Collings (scenario)
- Produced by: Adolph Zukor; Jesse L. Lasky; William LeBaron
- Starring: Ford Sterling; Lois Wilson; Louise Brooks
- Cinematography: Lee Garmes
- Edited by: Ralph Block
- Distributed by: Paramount Pictures
- Release date: August 16, 1926
- Running time: 7 reels (82 minutes)
- Country: United States
- Languages: Silent film (English intertitles)

The Show-Off is a 1926 American silent film comedy produced by Famous Players–Lasky and distributed by Paramount Pictures, based on the play of the same name by George Kelly. Directed by Mal St. Clair, the film stars Ford Sterling, Lois Wilson and Louise Brooks.

It's one of two films that co-starred popular Broadway actor Gregory Kelly (first husband of Ruth Gordon) who died shortly after The Show-Off wrapped production. The film was produced in Philadelphia and New York City thus becoming a sort of time capsule record of buildings long gone and neighborhoods changed.

== Plot ==
The Show-Off (full film)

Aubrey Piper, a mere clerk at the offices of the Pennsylvania Railroad, poses as an important executive to win the affections his sweetheart, Amy Fisher. He is a blustering, posturing, and showing off endlessly. Though all the members of her family - especially her mother - are contemptuous of him, Amy marries him; three months later she is fully aware of his faults.

To help his son Joe continue work on his invention (a rust-preventing paint), Pop Fisher gives him the money saved for the mortgage and shortly afterward dies of a stroke. Aubrey wins a Ford in a raffle and knocks down a traffic policeman while taking his prize out for a spin on Broad Street. He is arrested and Joe is forced to pay his fine with the mortgage money.

In the aftermath of this mayhem, Joe and his girlfriend Clara sadly realize they can not get married, and that the family home is likely lost. Realizing the tragedy he has brought upon Amy's family, Aubrey visits the directors of a steel company and--by bluffing--sells them Joe's invention. He rushes back to the Fisher's house, with a signed contract in his pocket and a check for $50,000.

There is a suspenseful ending - a representative of the bank is at the house, ready to foreclose on the mortgage and demanding that Mrs. Fisher sign the release to the deed. Aubrey bursts through the door, stops Mrs. Fisher from signing the deed, and explaining how he sealed the deal that saved them all. Amy embraces him, exclaiming "Aubrey, I always knew you'd make good!" His The Fishers are happy at last as the "show off" redeems himself. The last line in the movie is Mrs. Fisher bursting into happy tears, crying "Heaven help me from now on!" as Aubrey pats her shoulder and laughs triumphantly.

== Cast ==
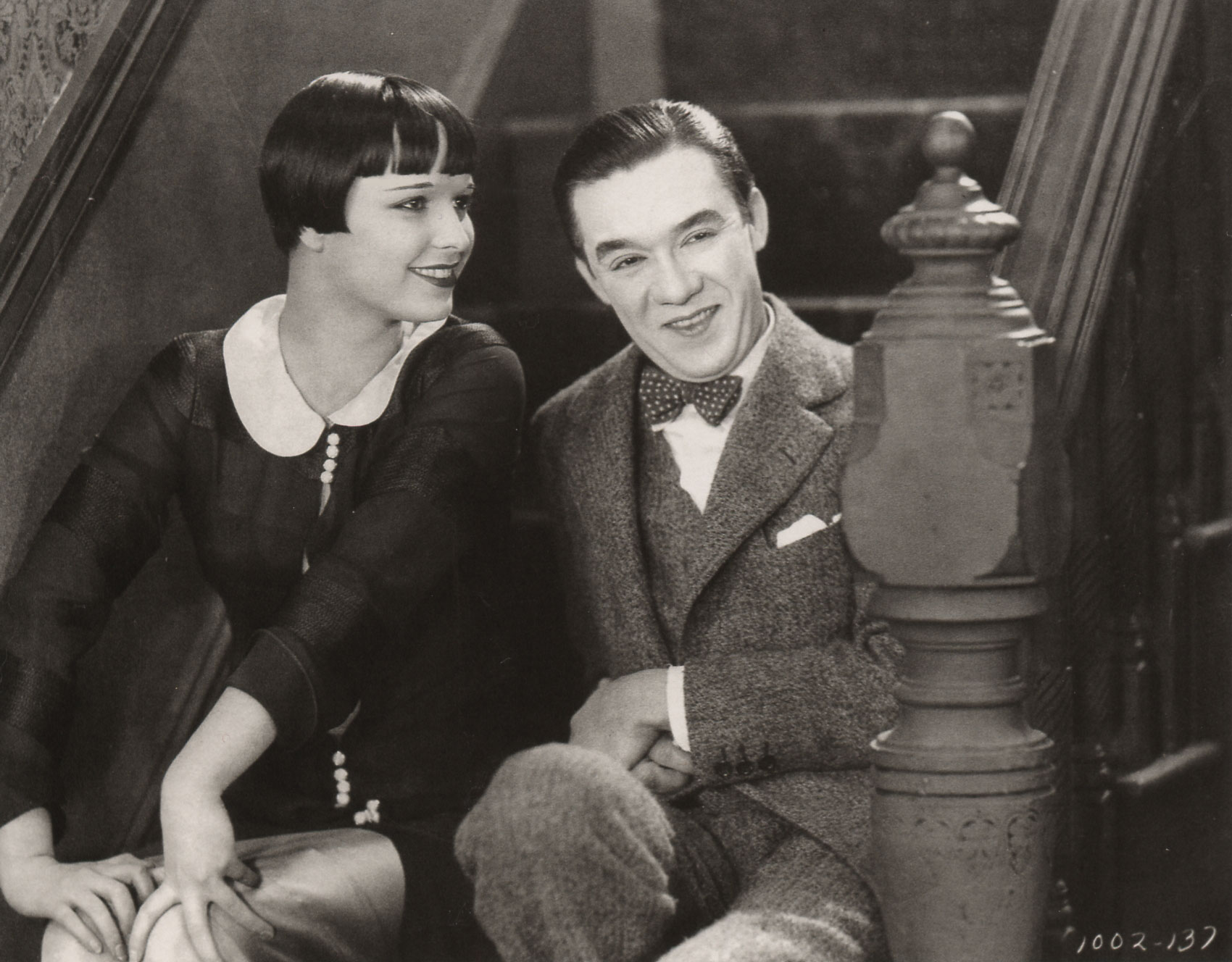
Louise Brooks and Gregory Kelly in The Show-Off

- Ford Sterling as Aubrey Piper
- Lois Wilson as Amy Fisher Piper
- Louise Brooks as Clara, Joe's Girl
- Gregory Kelly as Joe Fisher
- Claire McDowell as Mom Fisher
- Charles Goodrich as Pop Fisher
- Joseph W. Smiley as Railroad Executive

== Remakes ==
The film has been remade a number of times:

- with Hal Skelly and Doris Hill as Men Are Like That (1930).
- as The Show-Off (1934) with Spencer Tracy, Madge Evans, and Lois Wilson in a different role.
- as The Show-Off (1946) with Red Skelton and Marilyn Maxwell.
- On February 2, 1955, a 60-minute version of the play aired on the CBS Television series The Best of Broadway.

== Preservation status ==
Preserved at the Library of Congress, the film can be found in near mint condition on a Library of Congress related DVD.
