= Anne Froelick =

American screenwriter (1913–2010)

Anne Froelick Taylor
- Born: December 8, 1913; Hinsdale, Massachusetts, U.S.
- Died: January 26, 2010 (aged 96); Los Angeles, California, U.S.
- Occupations: Screenwriter; dramatist; novelist
- Spouse: Philip Taylor
- Children: 2
- Writing career
- Notable work: Harriet Craig (1950)

Anne Froelick Taylor (December 8, 1913 – January 26, 2010) was an American screenwriter from 1941 to 1950, and later a playwright and novelist. Her screenwriting career ended when two screenwriters named Froelick as a communist before the HUAC and was then blacklisted.

== Early years ==
Anne Froelick was born in Hinsdale, Massachusetts on December 8, 1913. At three years old, her mother was remarried to Louis D. Froelick (who was the co-founder and editor of the magazine Asia). After the marriage, Froelick adopted Anne and her sister, Peggy. Her family moved to Princeton, New Jersey, where she was admitted into Miss Fine's School. For school admissions, Anne took her stepfather's surname. When she was fifteen years old, her mother and stepfather separated and she moved to her mother's home town, Syracuse, New York. There, Froelick's mother opened her own dress shop targeted at teenage girls.

One year later, at sixteen years, Froelick enrolled into Smith College. During this time, she reconnected with her biological father, who supported her monthly while studying. Her scholarship was based on her midterm grades, and although they fell below academic standards, she was allowed to continue, after which her grades improved. Froelick remembered, "But in the meantime my mother had just decided that she wasn't going to let me back. She wanted my sister and me to take over her dress business."

At age 19, Froelick moved to New York City to start an acting career. She appeared in minor roles in local New York stage productions and summer theater. To support her acting career, Taylor worked as a model at fashion shows for Lord & Taylor and other department stores. She also worked as a model for fashion designer Elizabeth Hawes.

== Career ==
While she was modeling for Hawes, Froelick's biological father suggested she take a stenography course. Working at the Mercury Theatre had interested her so she accepted a secretary job for John Houseman. Houseman and Orson Welles later hired Howard Koch as a writer for Welles' The Mercury Theatre on the Air, and Froelick was reassigned as Koch's secretary. She assisted Koch on his radio adaptation of H. G. Wells' The War of the Worlds, which made broadcasting history when it aired that same year. In 1997, Froelick reflected: "We transferred the setting to this country [United States]. I picked this place in New Jersey, some place near Princeton, for the imaginary spaceship to land ... I remembered how they made us change the names of some things that people would recognize, and I resented that."

In 1939, Warner Bros. hired Koch as a screenwriter and he recommended they hire Froelick as a writer. Her first assignment was revising the script for The Letter (1940), directed by William Wyler. During the writing process, Koch handed her dialogue scenes to rewrite, among them were the romantic scenes. Despite her contributions, Koch was given the sole screenwriting credit. The film was acclaimed by film critics, and was nominated for an Academy Award for Best Picture. After eighteen months there, Warner Bros. signed Froelick to a writing contract. Her first screen credit was the 1941 drama Shining Victory, which she co-wrote with Koch, who again handed her dialogue pages to rewrite.

In 1942, Koch was hired to write the screenplay for Mission to Moscow (1943) for Michael Curtiz. He asked Froelick to accompany her, but she stayed behind as she had recently married. She decided instead to write the screenplay for Miss Susie Slagle's (1946) for Paramount Pictures. Nevertheless, she suggested her friend Anne Green for the job. After the film's release, Green married Koch, and they remained married until his death. In 1941, Miss Susie Slagle's was postponed when Sam Wood, who was attached to direct, decided to film For Whom the Bell Tolls (1943) instead. A year later, Froelick moved to RKO Pictures to write the screenplay for The Master Race (1944). She did on-set rewrites, and when filming concluded, she returned to Paramount to finish the Miss Susie Slagle's script. She followed up with Easy Come, Easy Go (1947). After this, she went to Columbia Pictures to write the screenplay for Harriet Craig (1950), a remake of 1936's Craig's Wife.

During this time, Froelick became involved in political activism, including opposing fascism and promoting unions and desegregation. This led her to join the Communist Party. In a 1997 interview, she stated she was not very active, but nevertheless went to "meetings and to a lot of events and activities." In 1951, Froelick's party membership caused her husband, Philip Taylor, to lose his job as a manufacturing planner at Lockheed. During the last hearings for the House Un-American Activities Committee (HUAC), in 1953, she was accused publicly to be a communist by fellow screenwriters Leopold Atlas and Sol Shor. Froelick was subsequently blacklisted, but continued to write for a living using her married name.

Froelick wrote one unpublished novel titled Fee Fi Fo Friend, which was inspired by her political activism and subsequent blacklisting. She took to alcohol to help self-medicate, and later went to Alcoholics Anonymous to fight her addiction. She wrote four plays that were produced locally, including Storm in the Sun. Along with that, she co-wrote a comic novel, Press on Regardless, about a female sports-car addict, with Fern Mosk, which was published by Simon & Schuster in 1956.

Anne Froelick Taylor died of natural causes on January 26, 2010, aged 96, in a nursing home in Los Angeles.

== Filmography ==
Year	Title	Notes
1940	The Letter	With Howard Koch; Uncredited
1941	Shining Victory	With Howard Koch; First onscreen writing credit
1944	The Master Race	With Herbert J. Biberman and Rowland Leigh
1946	Miss Susie Slagle's	With Hugo Butler, Adrian Scott, and Theodore Strauss
1947	Easy Come, Easy Go	With Francis Edward Faragoh and John McNulty
1950	Harriet Craig	With James Gunn

== Bibliography ==
- Koch, Howard (1979). As Time Goes by: Memoirs of a Writer. New York: Harcourt Brace Jovanovich. ISBN 0151097690.
- McGilligan, Patrick; Buhle, Paul (1997). "Anne Froelick". Tender Comrades: A Backstory of the Hollywood Blacklist. New York: St. Martin's Press. pp. 250–259. ISBN 0-312-17046-7.
