= The Show-Off =

1924 play

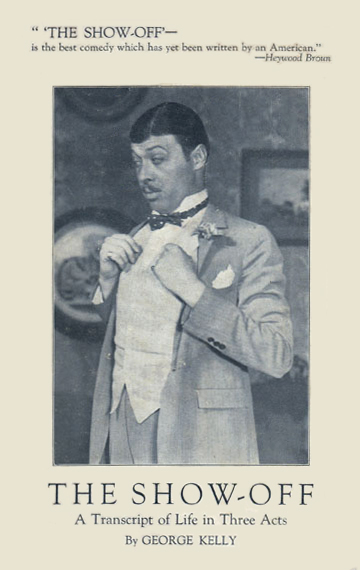
- First edition dust jacket featuring Louis John Bartels in the original Broadway production
- Original language: English
- Written by: George Kelly
- Genre: Comedy

Premiere
- Date: February 5, 1924
- Place: Playhouse Theatre; New York City

The Show-Off is a 1924 stage play by George Kelly about a working-class North Philadelphian family's reluctance to accept their daughter's suitor Aubrey Piper, an overly confident Socialist buffoon. The play has been revived five times on Broadway and adapted for film four times; it is Kelly's most frequently produced play.

== Production history ==
The characters and basic premise of The Show-Off first appeared in Poor Aubrey, a one-act vaudeville sketch written by George Kelly that premiered in 1919 and "toured the country before and even during the run of The Show-Off." Expanded into a three-act comedy of manners, the play opened on Broadway on February 5, 1924 at the Playhouse Theatre with Louis John Bartels as Aubrey Piper, Helen Lowell as Mrs. Fisher, and a 25-year-old Lee Tracy making his Broadway debut in the role of Joe. Kelly directed the play himself and demanded that the actors mimic his line readings; Tracy later recalled, "We used to beg [Helen Lowell] during rehearsals to make mistakes in her lines, so Kelly would get up and show her how it ought to be done. We loved to watch him. He acted the whole part right out for her.

Kelly envisioned the play as a "transcript of life," and critics praised his naturalistic dialogue, with Robert Benchley writing, "The way in which every-day small talk and idioms are strung together, with scarcely a wisecrack or a gag-line to lend artificial brilliance, is just about as smooth a piece of work as we ever remember seeing." The show was a "monster hit" and played 571 performances before closing in June 1925. Jurors voted to award the 1924 Pulitzer Prize for Drama to The Show-Off, but "the prize's administrator, Columbia University, overruled the jury in favor of" Hell-Bent Fer Heaven, a play written by a Columbia professor; the suggestion of cronyism prompted an uproar.

== Revivals ==
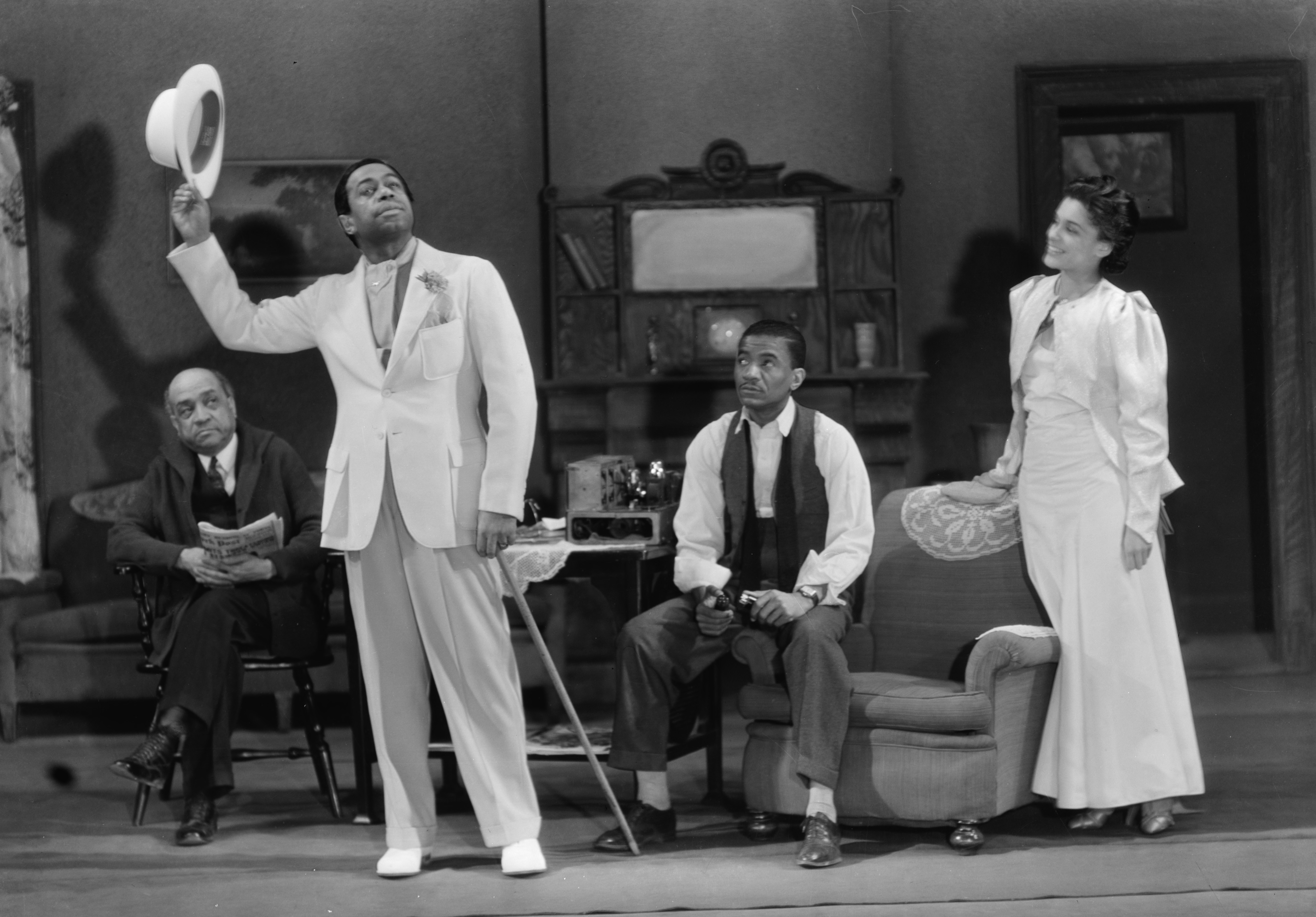
Dooley Wilson (standing center) starred as Aubrey Piper in the 1937 Federal Theatre Project production of The Show-Off.

A Broadway revival opened at the Hudson Theatre on December 12, 1932, closing in March 1933 after 119 performances. The revival was directed by Raymond Walburn, who also starred as Aubrey Piper.

The Negro Theatre Unit of the Federal Theatre Project of the WPA produced a revival that opened at the Lafayette Theatre in Harlem on March 5, 1937, closing on May 8, 1937.

The third Broadway revival of The Show-Off opened at the Arena Theatre on May 31, 1950, closing on June 17 after 21 performances. Lee Tracy, who had appeared in the original Broadway production, returned to the play in the role of Aubrey Piper, and the cast also featured Jane Seymour as Mrs. Fisher.

A Broadway revival opened at the Lyceum Theatre on December 5, 1967, closing on June 22, 1968 after 69 performances. Playing in repertory with stagings of Exit the King, The Cherry Orchard, and Pantagleize, the production featured Clayton Corzatte as Aubrey Piper and Helen Hayes as Mrs. Fisher. A return engagement of this production, playing in repertory with Pantagleize, returned to the Lyceum Theatre from September 13–28, 1968.

The most recent Broadway revival of The Show-Off was produced by the Roundabout Theatre Company and opened at Criterion Center Stage Right on November 5, 1992, closing on December 13, 1992 after 45 performances. The cast included Boyd Gaines as Aubrey Piper and Pat Carroll as Mrs. Fisher.

The play has been frequently produced regionally and Off-Broadway. A 1984 production at the Paper Mill Playhouse in Millburn, New Jersey starred Orson Bean as Aubrey Piper and Jean Stapleton as Mrs. Fisher. In 2017, an Off-Broadway revival by the Peccadillo Theater Company starred Ian Gould as Aubrey Piper and Annette O'Toole as Mrs. Fisher; critics dismissed the play as a museum piece and likened the character of Aubrey, "a noisy know-it-all whose sense of truth is only marginally anchored in reality," to Donald Trump.

== Screen adaptations ==
In 1926, Famous Players–Lasky adapted The Show-Off into a silent movie of the same name starring Ford Sterling, Lois Wilson, and Louise Brooks; the film was shot in New York City and Philadelphia. A 1930 remake titled Men Are Like That followed, starring Hal Skelly and Clara Blandick. Metro-Goldwyn-Mayer subsequently acquired the film rights to the play and remade it in 1934, as a vehicle for Spencer Tracy, and in 1946, as a vehicle for Red Skelton.

== Context and influence ==
In 1992, The New York Times critic Mel Gussow observed that "The Show-Off was very much of its period, a time of expanding economic opportunity with ample room for go-getters to get ahead. In telling the story of the brash Aubrey, Kelly also struck a universal theme: the obstreperous outsider breaking into a closed society." Defined by his credo "A little bit of bluff goes a long way," the character of Aubrey is an archetypal con artist. Kelly biographer Foster Hirsch argued that "Aubrey was so exact an incarnation of an American character that he 'became part of the language, a synonym for a self-delusive braggart.'
