= The Show-Off (1934 film) =

1934 film by Charles Reisner

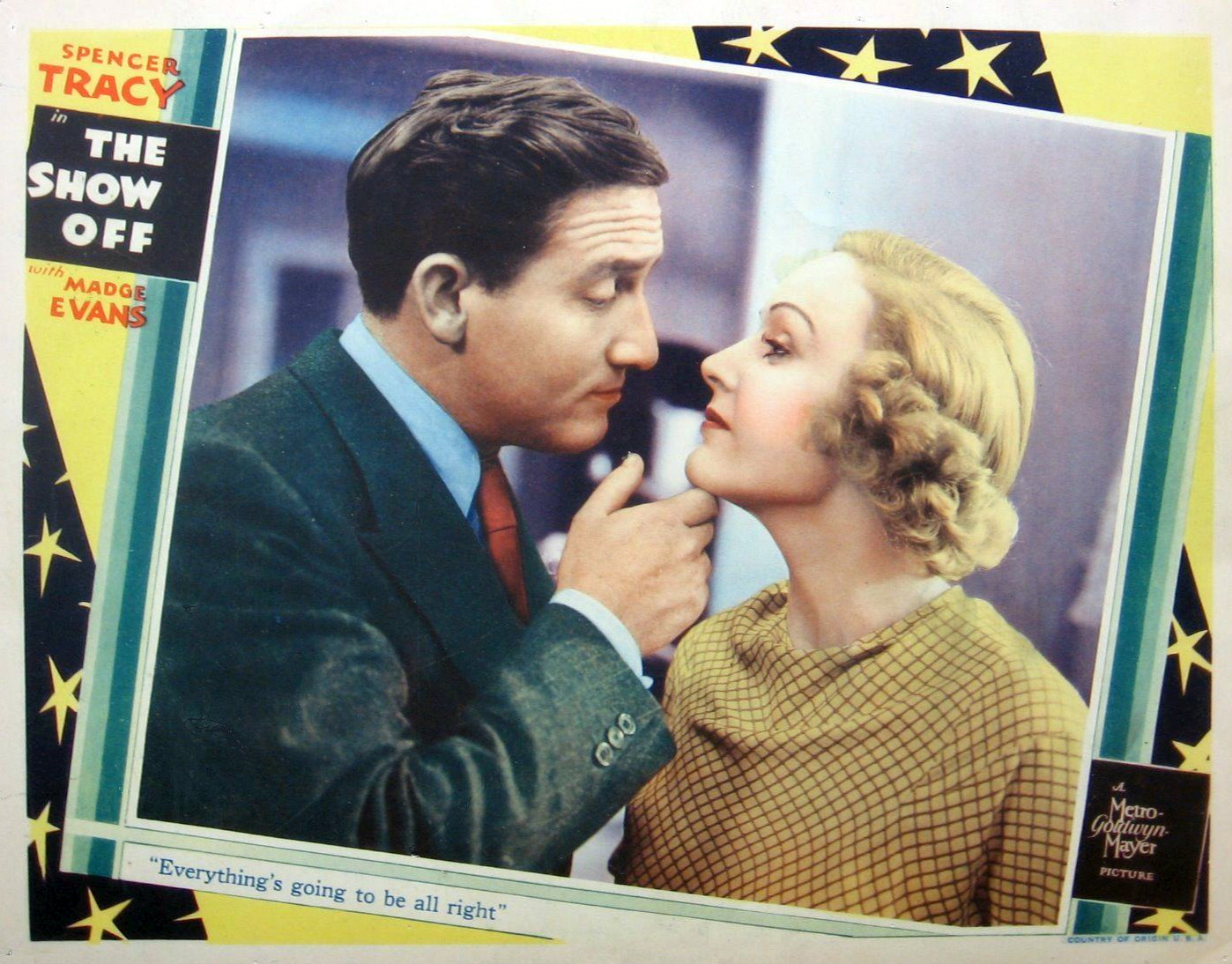
- Lobby card
- Directed by: Charles Reisner
- Written by: Herman J. Mankiewicz
- Based on: The Show-Off by George Kelly
- Produced by: Lucien Hubbard
- Starring: Spencer Tracy; Madge Evans; Henry Wadsworth
- Cinematography: James Wong Howe
- Edited by: William S. Gray
- Production company: Metro-Goldwyn-Mayer
- Distributed by: Loew's, Inc.
- Release date: March 9, 1934
- Running time: 77 minutes
- Country: United States
- Language: English
- Budget: $162,000
- Box office: $397,000

The Show-Off is a 1934 American comedy film directed by Charles Reisner and starring Spencer Tracy, Madge Evans and Henry Wadsworth. It is notable for being the first movie Tracy made for Metro-Goldwyn-Mayer; he was on loan-out from Fox at the time and later moved to MGM.

Based on the hit play of the same title by George Kelly, it made a profit of $78,000. Previously filmed twice by Paramount Pictures in 1926 and 1930, under the title Men Are Like That, and MGM remade the film in 1946, starring Red Skelton and Marilyn Maxwell.

== Plot ==
Out sailing one day, J. Aubrey Piper saves a man from drowning. He overhears an impressed Amy Fisher's remark and looks her up in New Jersey, irritating her family with his constant bragging but winning Amy, who marries him.

A humble railroad clerk, Aubrey keeps pretending to be a more important man. He spends lavishly, piling up so much debt that he and Amy must move in with her parents. He gets fired by his boss Preston for making a wild offer on a piece of land, overstepping his authority by far.

Amy is fed up and intends to leave him. Aubrey runs into her brother Joe, an inventor whose rust-prevention idea has received a firm offer of $5,000. Aubrey goes to the firm and demands Joe get $100,000 plus a 50% ownership interest. The company rescinds its offer entirely.

Everybody's fed up with Aubrey, but suddenly Joe rushes home to say the company's changed its mind, offering him $50,000 plus 20%. And the railroad property paid off, too, so Aubrey's offered his old job back, with a raise. He knows how lucky he's been and that he should just shut up, but he just can't.

== Cast ==
- Spencer Tracy as Aubrey Piper
- Madge Evans as Amy Fisher Piper
- Henry Wadsworth as Joe Fisher
- Lois Wilson as Clara Harling
- Grant Mitchell as Mr. 'Pa' Fisher
- Clara Blandick as Mrs. 'Ma' Fisher
- Alan Edwards as Frank Harling
- Claude Gillingwater as J.B. Preston

== Radio adaptation ==
The Show-Off was adapted twice for radio by the Lux Radio Theatre. The first one-hour broadcast was on December 9, 1935, starring Joe E. Brown; the second was on February 1, 1943, starring Harold Peary.
