= Marked Money =

1928 film

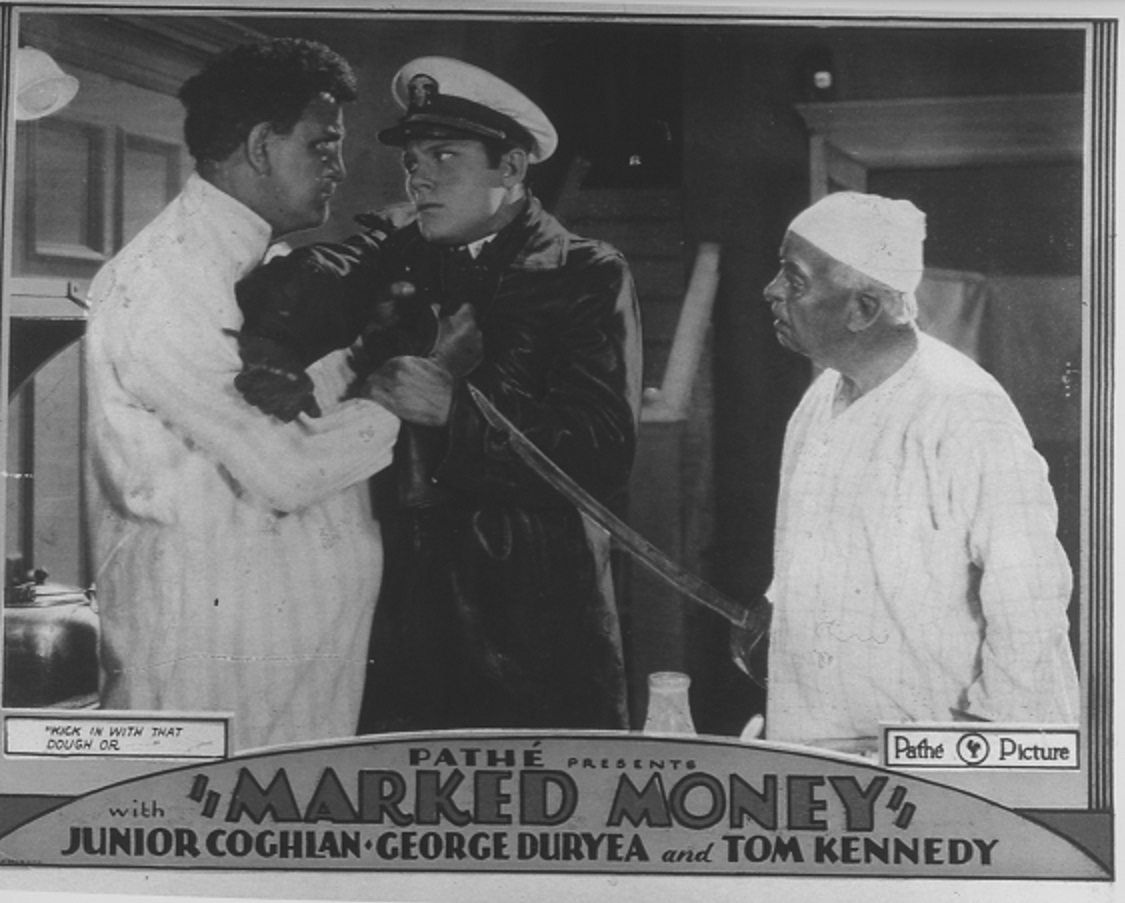
- Directed by: Spencer Gordon Bennet
- Written by: George Dromgold; Howard J. Green; Sanford Hewitt; John W. Krafft
- Produced by: Hector Turnbull
- Starring: Tom Keene; Tom Kennedy; Virginia Bradford
- Cinematography: Edward Snyder
- Edited by: Harold McLernon
- Production company: Pathé Exchange
- Distributed by: Pathé Exchange
- Release date: November 11, 1928
- Running time: 60 minutes
- Country: United States
- Languages: Sound (Synchronized) (English Intertitles)

Marked Money is a 1928 American synchronized sound action film directed by Spencer Gordon Bennet and starring Tom Keene, Tom Kennedy and Virginia Bradford. While the film has no audible dialog, it was released with a synchronized musical score with sound effects using the RCA Photophone sound-on-film process.

The film's sets were designed by the art director Edward C. Jewell.

== Plot ==
Attorney Peckham is murdered by a gang of criminals just as he is about to deliver a tin box containing $25,000 in marked bills—left as an inheritance by a deceased sailor—to Captain Fairchild, an old shipmate of the boy's father. The crooks, however, mistakenly steal a second box from Peckham’s car—this one filled with fishing tackle—leaving the real money behind.

Captain Fairchild receives the orphaned boy into his home. Since it is a Saturday and the banks are closed, the captain entrusts the box of money to Bill Clemons, his loyal cook and former shipmate, instructing him to keep it safe until Monday.

The captain's spirited daughter, Grace Fairchild, is secretly in love with Clyde, a young naval aviation officer. Aware of her father’s disdain for aviators, she instructs Clyde to conceal his identity and hide his aviation insignia when he comes to dinner, pretending instead to be a sailor.

During dinner, a mishap occurs when Boy’s mischievous pet monkey bites Clyde’s hand. As Clyde draws a handkerchief, his aviation insignia flies out and lands directly in Captain Fairchild’s soup plate. Outraged, the captain orders Clyde from the house. Outside, Grace and Clyde agree to elope later that night.

Meanwhile, Bill Clemons, unsure of where to hide the box of money, ices it like a cake and places it in the kitchen's cake drawer. One of the gang members spies through the window and sees Bill's clever ruse. Boy, also having witnessed the process, believes it to be a real cake and sneaks back to the kitchen at night to eat some. While there, he overhears the crooks breaking in and hides under the sink with the "cake."

Grace slips out of the house for her rendezvous with Clyde. The crooks, mistaking her handbag for the container of money, kidnap her and speed away in a Ford. Boy dashes outside and climbs into the car’s spare tire, clinging to the back of the vehicle.

When Clyde arrives, he is attacked by the furious Captain Fairchild and Bill, who assume he abducted Grace. They are only convinced of his innocence when the crooks call the house and demand ransom in exchange for her release. Just as they prepare to respond, Boy returns—having driven into town on a milk wagon—and reveals the gang’s hideout near an airplane hangar.

The group rushes to the location, where the crooks are preparing to flee with Grace in an airplane bound for Mexico. Clyde knocks out Scudder, the pilot, but is forced at gunpoint by Donovan, the leader of the gang, to take the controls and fly the plane. Unknown to them, Boy climbs into the tail section of the aircraft.

While piloting, Clyde keeps one eye on Donovan. When the crook is distracted, Clyde knocks the pistol away and a struggle ensues. Both men fall from the plane. Donovan’s parachute opens; Clyde clings to him until they near the ground, then leaps into a haystack, where Captain Fairchild and the police are waiting. Donovan is promptly arrested.

Meanwhile, Boy crawls into the cockpit and, following Grace’s instructions, manages to cut her bonds with his pocketknife. Grace, having been trained in flying by Clyde, takes control and lands the aircraft safely.

Captain Fairchild, now thoroughly impressed by both airplanes and aviators, offers his blessing to Clyde and Grace. Boy, having saved the day, earns a place in the captain’s heart—and in the family.

== Cast ==
- Frank Coghlan Jr. as Boy
- Tom Keene as Clyde
- Tom Kennedy as Bill Clemons
- Bert Woodruff as Capt. Fairchild
- Virginia Bradford as Grace Fairchild
- Maurice Black as Donovan
- Jack Richardson as Scudder
- Mark Hamilton as Mariner Bill

== Music ==
The soundtrack featured the song "Dream River" which was composed by George Brown which serves as the theme song for the film.

== See also ==
- List of early sound feature films (1926–1929)

== Bibliography ==
- Munden, Kenneth White. The American Film Institute Catalog of Motion Pictures Produced in the United States, Part 1. University of California Press, 1997.
