= The Wreck of the Hesperus (1927 film) =

1927 film by Elmer Clifton

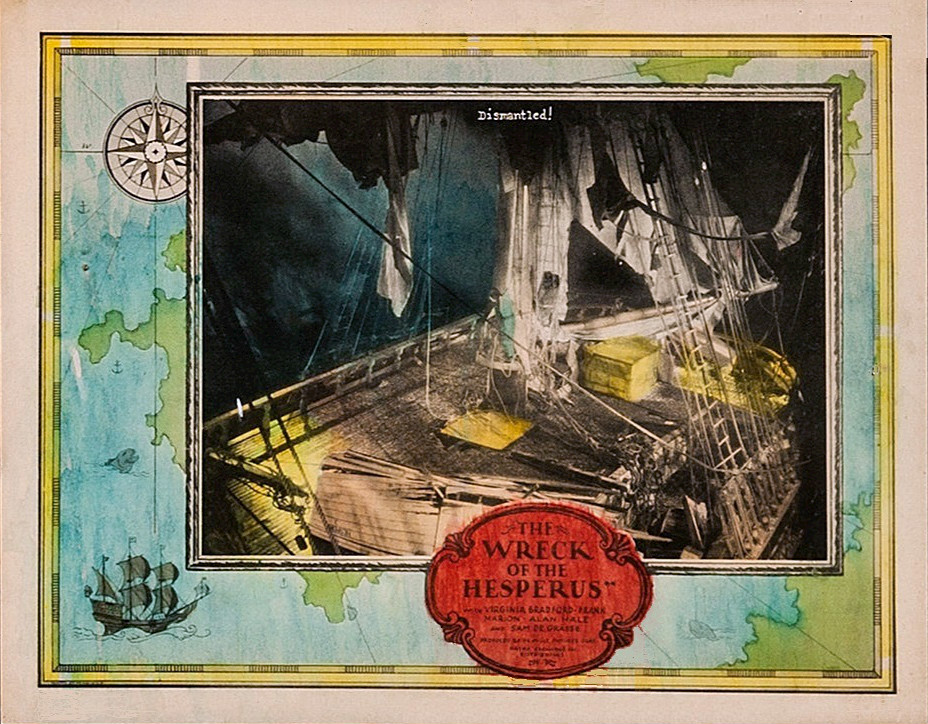
- Lobby card
- Directed by: Elmer Clifton
- Screenplay by: John Farrow; Harry Carr
- Based on: "The Wreck of the Hesperus" by Henry Wadsworth Longfellow
- Produced by: Cecil B. DeMille
- Starring: Alan Hale; Virginia Bradford; Frank Marion
- Cinematography: John J. Mescall
- Production company: DeMille Pictures Corporation
- Distributed by: Pathé Exchange
- Release date: October 31, 1927
- Running time: 7 reels
- Country: United States
- Language: Silent (English intertitles)

The Wreck of the Hesperus is a 1927 American silent film based on the famous poem. It was an early screenplay credit for later film director John Farrow.

== Cast ==
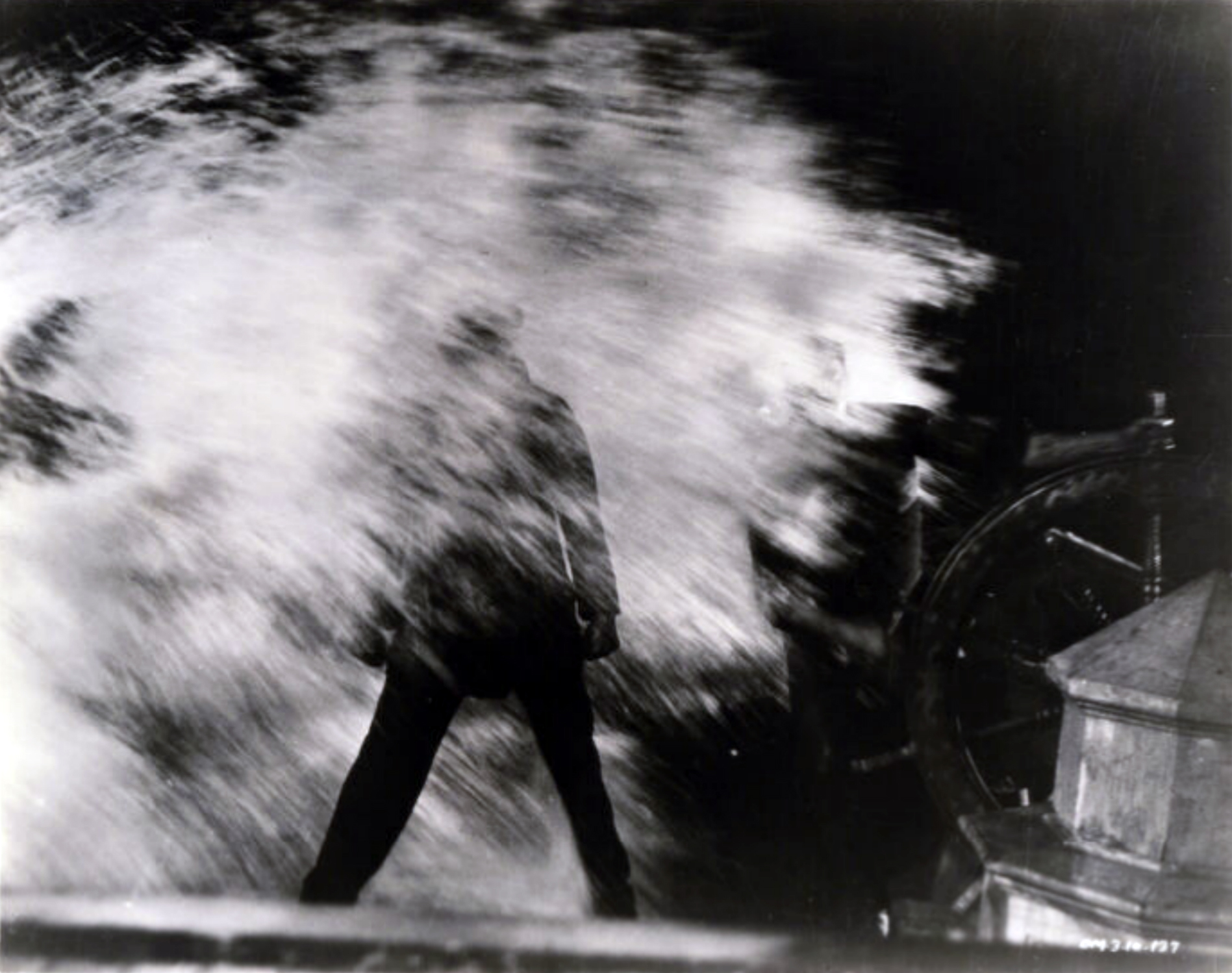
A wave crashes over cast members in The Wreck of the Hesperus

- Sam De Grasse as Capt. David Slocum
- Virginia Bradford as Gale Slocum
- Francis Ford as John Hazzard
- Francis Marion as John Hazzard Jr.
- Alan Hale as Singapore Jack
- Ethel Wales as Deborah Slocum
- Josephine Norman as The Bride
- Milton Holmes as Zeke
- Jimmy Aldine as Cabin boy (credited as James Aldine)
- Budd Fine as First Mate
- Slim Summerville

== Preservation status ==
This film was considered to be a lost for many years, but it was rediscovered at Cineteca Milano in 2025 and screened at the Orinda Theatre on November 13, 2025.
