= Stage Madness =

1927 film by Victor Schertzinger

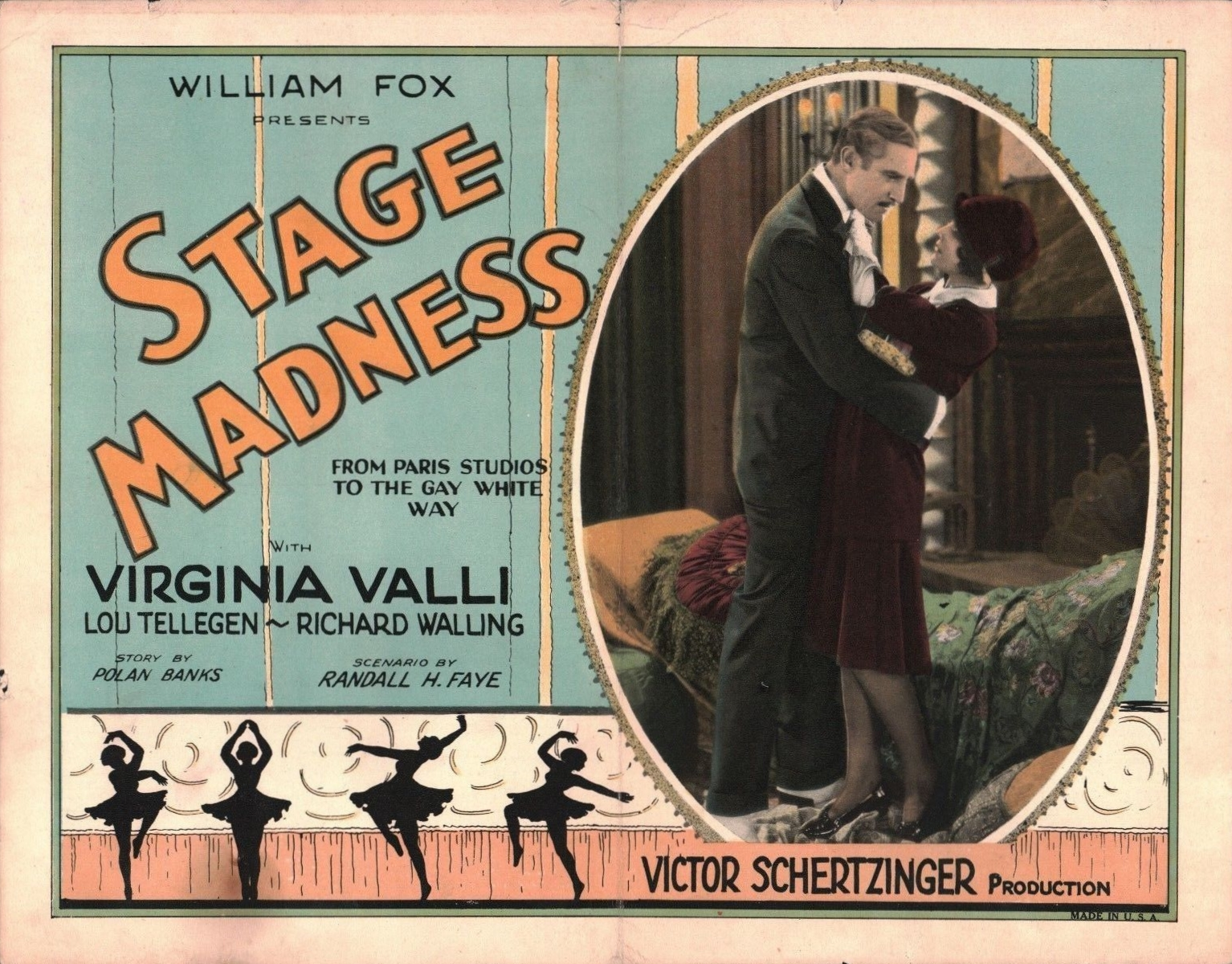
- Lobby card
- Directed by: Victor Schertzinger
- Screenplay by: Randall Faye
- Story by: Polan Banks
- Starring: Virginia Valli; Tullio Carminati; Virginia Bradford; Lou Tellegen; Richard Walling; Tyler Brooke
- Cinematography: Glen MacWilliams
- Production company: Fox Film Corporation
- Distributed by: Fox Film Corporation
- Release date: January 9, 1927
- Running time: 60 minutes
- Country: United States
- Language: English

Stage Madness is a 1927 American drama film directed by Victor Schertzinger and written by Randall Faye. The film stars Virginia Valli, Tullio Carminati, Virginia Bradford, Lou Tellegen, Richard Walling and Tyler Brooke. The film was released on January 9, 1927, by Fox Film Corporation.

== Cast ==
- Virginia Valli as Madame Lamphier
- Tullio Carminati as Andrew Marlowe
- Virginia Bradford as Dora Anderson
- Lou Tellegen as Pierre Doumier
- Richard Walling as Jimmy Mason
- Tyler Brooke as H.H. Bragg
- Lillian Knight as French Maid
- Bodil Rosing as Maid
