= The Yankee Clipper (film) =

1927 film

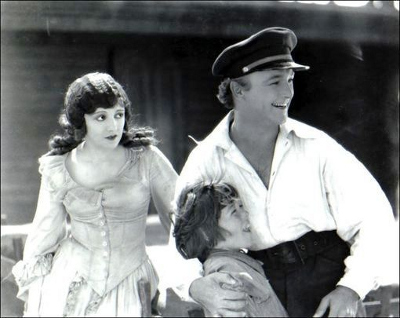
- The film's three stars (from left): Elinor Fair, Junior Coghlan, and William Boyd
- Directed by: Rupert Julian
- Written by: Denison Clift (story); Garrett Fort (adaptation); John W. Krafft (titles); Garnett Weston (adaptation)
- Produced by: Cecil B. DeMille
- Starring: William Boyd; John Harron; Elinor Fair; Junior Coghlan
- Cinematography: Robert LaPresle
- Edited by: Claude Berkeley
- Distributed by: Producers Distributing Corporation
- Release date: May 7, 1927
- Running time: 88 minutes
- Country: United States
- Language: Silent (English intertitles)

The Yankee Clipper is a 88-minute 1927 American silent adventure film directed by Rupert Julian. It is set against the maritime rivalry between the United States and Great Britain in the mid-19th century.

== Plot ==
The film opens in England in the court of Queen Victoria. Lord Anthony Huntington, the country's foremost shipbuilder, is tasked with preventing the United States from breaking England's grip on the tea trade. Huntington boasts that his new ship, Lord of the Isles, will outsail any American ship.

In America, the U.S. president meets with a Boston shipbuilder, Thomas Winslow, who vows that his new vessel will challenge England's vaunted speed. The builder introduces his son, Hal Winslow (William Boyd), who will command the new Yankee Clipper on its maiden voyage to China. The President tells the young captain that America's hope of prestige on the seas rests with him.

Several days into the journey, a stowaway, a young boy named Mickey Murphy (Junior Coughlan) is found hiding in a burlap sack. The boy is an orphan who announces his hatred of women.

While in China, Winslow attends a dinner hosted by a wealthy Chinese merchant and rescues an English woman Lady Jocelyn Huntington (Elinor Fair) from rioting beggars. Winslow agrees to a race from China to Boston against the Lord of the Isles. He wins the race and the affection of Lady Jocelyn.

== Cast ==
- William Boyd as Captain Hal Winslow
- Elinor Fair as Lady Jocelyn Huntington
- Junior Coghlan as Mickey Murphy
- John Miljan as Paul de Vigny
- Walter Long as ‘Iron Head’ Joe
- Louis Payne as Lord Huntington
- Burr McIntosh as Thomas Winslow
- George Ovey as Alf
- Zack Williams as Ham
- William Blaisdell as Ike
- Clarence Burton as Captain McIntosh
- Stanton Heck as American Mate
- Julia Faye as Queen Victoria
- Harry Holden as President Zachary Taylor
- Nicholas Soussanin as Prince Consort
- James Wang as Chinese Merchant
- Jimmy Dime as Seaman (uncredited)
- Jack Kenny as Seaman (uncredited)
- Sally Rand as Wing Toy (uncredited)

== Production credits ==
- Rupert Julian, director and producer
- Denison Clift, story
- Garrett Weston, adaptation
- John W. Krafft, titles
- John J. Mescall, photographer
- Harold McLernon film editor
- Leigh R. Smith, assistant director

== Reception ==
Following the film's screen debut in Pittsburgh, The Pittsburgh Press called it "a screen classic that will rank among the best of the season's output."

The website AllMovie gave the film a rating of three stars.
