= Atta Boy =

1926 film

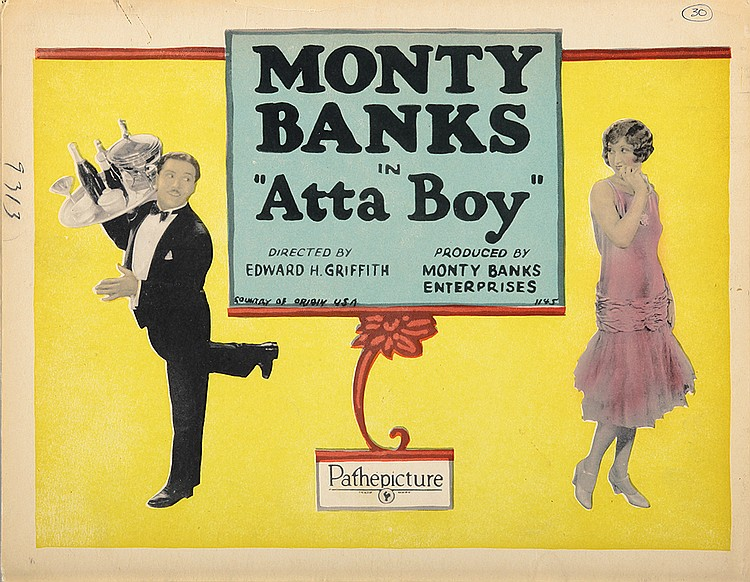
- Lobby card
- Directed by: Edward H. Griffith
- Written by: Charles Horan; Alfred J. Goulding; Harold Christie
- Produced by: Monty Banks
- Starring: Monty Banks; Virginia Bradford; Ernest Wood
- Cinematography: William Rees; Ted Tetzlaff; Blake Wagner
- Production company: Monty Banks Productions
- Distributed by: Pathe Exchange
- Release date: October 10, 1926
- Running time: 63 minutes
- Country: United States
- Language: Silent (English intertitles)

Atta Boy is a 1926 American silent comedy film directed by Edward H. Griffith and starring Monty Banks, Virginia Bradford, and Ernest Wood.

== Cast ==
- Monty Banks as Monty Milde
- Virginia Bradford as The Girl
- Ernest Wood as Craven, Reporter
- Fred Kelsey as Detective
- Virginia Pearson as Madame Carlton
- Henry A. Barrows as Mr. Harrie
- Earl Metcalfe as Mr. Harrie's Brother
- Mary Carr as Grandmother
- America Chedister as Fashionable Woman
- Jimmy Phillips as Mr. Harrie's Kidnapped Son

== Preservation ==
Prints of Atta Boy are located in the collections of the UCLA Film and Television Archive, BFI National Archive, and Filmoteca Española.

== Bibliography ==
- Munden, Kenneth White. The American Film Institute Catalog of Motion Pictures Produced in the United States, Part 1. University of California Press, 1997.
