= The Shadow Laughs =

1933 film by Arthur Hoerl

- Directed by: Arthur Hoerl
- Written by: Arthur Hoerl
- Starring: Hal Skelly; Rose Hobart; Harry T. Morey
- Cinematography: Don Malkames; Nick Rogalli
- Edited by: Barney Rogan
- Production company: Trojan Pictures
- Distributed by: Trojan Pictures
- Release date: March 27, 1933
- Running time: 67 minutes
- Country: United States
- Language: English

The Shadow Laughs is a 1933 American Pre-Code mystery film directed by Arthur Hoerl and starring Hal Skelly, Rose Hobart and Harry T. Morey.

== Cast ==
- Hal Skelly as Robin Dale
- Rose Hobart as Ruth Hackett
- Harry T. Morey as Capt. Morgan
- Walter Fenner as Tennant
- Robert Keith as George Hackett
- Geoffrey Bryant as Ryan
- Harry Short as Clymer
- John F. Morrissey as Sgt. Owens
- Cesar Romero as Tony Rico
