= Junior Coghlan =

American actor (1916–2009)

Frank Coghlan Jr.
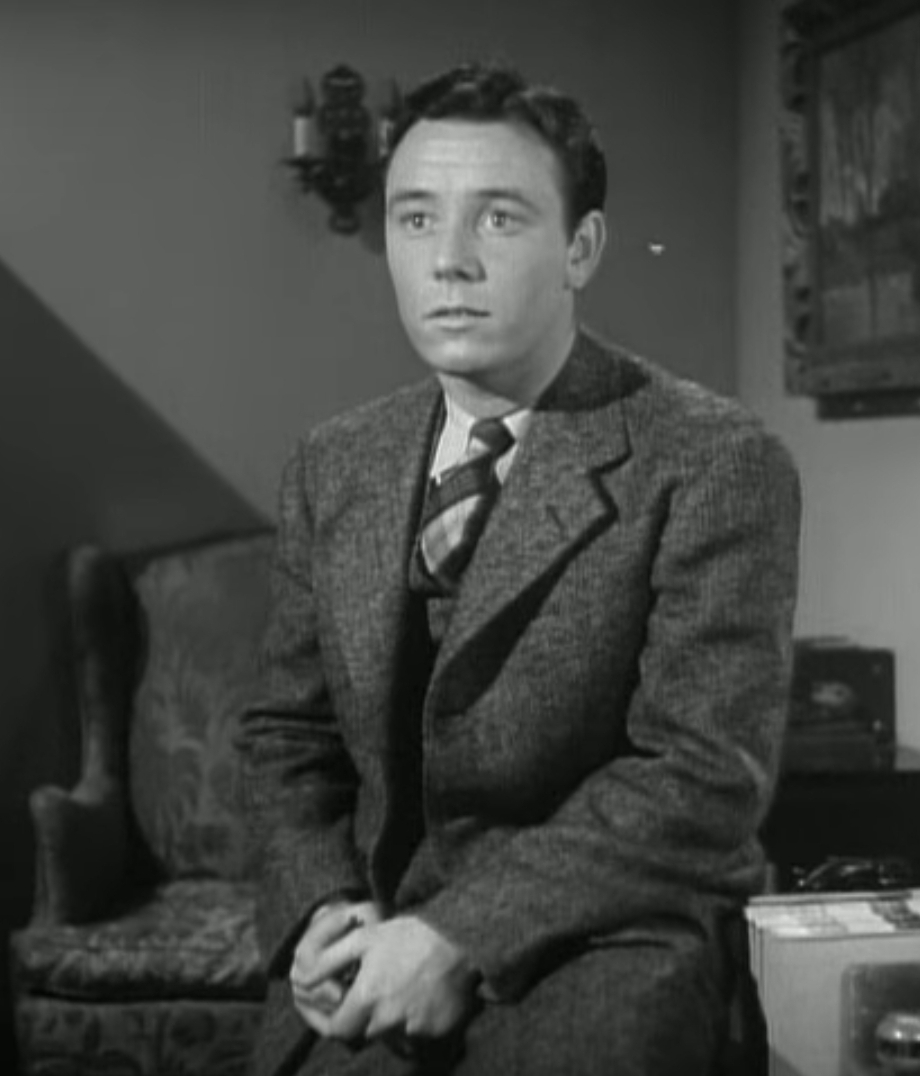
- Coghlan in Adventures of Captain Marvel (1941)
- Born: March 15, 1916; New Haven, Connecticut, U.S.
- Died: September 7, 2009 (aged 93); Saugus, California, U.S.
- Resting place: All Souls Cemetery, Long Beach, California
- Other name: Junior Coghlan
- Occupation: Actor
- Years active: 1920–1969
- Spouses: Betty Corrigan (m. 1943; died 1974) Letha Schwarzrock (m. 1975; died 2001)
- Children: 5

Frank Coghlan Jr. (March 15, 1916 – September 7, 2009), also known as Junior Coghlan, was an American actor who later became a career officer in the United States Navy and a naval aviator. He appeared in approximately 129 films and television programs between 1920 and 1974.

During the 1920s and 1930s, he became a popular child and juvenile actor, appearing in films with Pola Negri, Jack Dempsey, William Haines, Shirley Temple, Mickey Rooney, William Boyd and Bette Davis. Although he appeared in early Our Gang comedies, he is best known for the role of Billy Batson in the 1941 motion picture serial and first comic book superhero film, Adventures of Captain Marvel.

Coghlan later served 23 years as an aviator and officer in the U.S. Navy, from 1942 to 1965. After retiring from the Navy, he returned to acting and appeared in television, films, and commercials. He published an autobiography in 1992 and died in 2009 at age 93.

== Early life ==
Coghlan was born in New Haven, Connecticut, but his parents moved to Hollywood when he was still a baby. His father was a doctor, and in "Who's Who on the Screen" for 1932 he hoped to be a doctor, too, when he grew up. Coghlan began appearing in motion pictures in 1920 as an extra and worked his way up to more important roles. He later boasted that he had been gainfully employed since age three. The freckle-faced Coghlan was billed as "Junior Coghlan" and became one of Hollywood's most popular child stars. Film historian Leonard Maltin said, "He was one of the busiest child actors of the late '20s and 1930s. He was a fresh, freckle-faced boy with great All-American-type appeal."

=== Silent films ===
Coghlan began his acting career in 1920, appearing with Jack Dempsey in Daredevil Jack. In 1922 he co-starred with Brownie the Dog in a film called Rookies, and in 1923 he played a small role in the Pola Negri film The Spanish Dancer. He also appeared in early Hal Roach Our Gang films, including the 1923 short Giants vs. Yanks, in which the gang, after having a baseball game called off, gets stuck in an elegant home, which they destroy. In 1924 Coghlan was again cast opposite Jack Dempsey in Winning His Way.

One newspaper story described Coghlan's rise to fame this way: "When the boy was seven years old, his great mop of hair, freckled face, genial grin, and likable personality attracted the attention of several directors who urged his parents to permit him to engage in screen work. Mrs. Coghlan finally consented and one day he was cast for a 'bit' role in Goldwyn's Poverty of Riches, in which he played the son of Leatrice Joy."

By the mid 1920s, Coghlan had caught the eye of one of Hollywood's leading directors, Cecil B. DeMille. DeMille called Coghlan "the perfect example of a homeless waif" and signed the boy to a long-term contract in 1926. The Los Angeles Times reported on the event:

DeMille Signs Child Actor
So far, Cecil B. DeMille hasn't run much to giving picture contracts to youngsters. But yesterday Mr. DeMille signified what he thought of Junior Coghlan by placing him under a long-term contract. The boy has appeared in several DeMille pictures, including 'The Road to Yesterday.' The boy gives promise of being another Wesley Berry, with the same impish glance, the same freckles and the same cleverness. Of course, the office of freckled boy of the movies is a fixed institution, and now that Wes Berry has gone and got himself married he can't pretend to like playing marbles in the movies. Little Junior is to be cofeatured with Eleanor Faire and William Boyd in Rupert Julian's The Yankee Clipper.

Junior Coughlin c. 1927

In 1927, Coghlan appeared in the baseball comedy Slide, Kelly, Slide, playing an orphan who became a mascot and inspiration for an ace baseball pitcher, played by William Haines.

By 1928, Coghlan was such a well-known star that the Los Angeles Times reported on his schooling as well as his film projects. By age 11, Coghlan was asking to play grownup roles. A newspaper article at the time reported that Coghlan, "like every other young and red-blooded American, desires to arrive at manhood as soon as possible. Long trousers is what he wants, but the motion picture claims him and demands that he stay in knee breeches."

Coghlan's final film on his four-year DeMille-Pathe contract was 1929's military academy drama Square Shoulders. Conceived as a silent film, Square Shoulders was transformed into a "talkie" by the expedient of adding sound to the final reel. Only the silent version is known to survive.

A 1929 newspaper story on Coghlan noted that the twelve-year-old actor was "recognized by the motion picture public as the leading juvenile screen player in the world."

=== Talking pictures ===
With the arrival of the talking pictures, Coghlan continued to be one of the most popular juvenile actors. In the classic 1931 gangster film The Public Enemy, Coghlan played the role of James Cagney's character, Tom Powers, as a boy. In the 1931 screen version of Booth Tarkington's Penrod and Sam, Coghlan starred as Sam, with Leon Janney playing Penrod.

In 1932, Coghlan appeared in the Bette Davis drama Hell's House. Davis played the girlfriend of Pat O'Brien's bootlegger character. Coghlan played the role of Shorty, a sickly boy who was sent to a state industrial school where children were forced to work at hard labor, ending up in solitary confinement.

Coghlan had another starring role in the 1932 film serial The Last of the Mohicans, based on the James Fenimore Cooper novel. Coghlan played the part of Uncas, the sachem of the Mohegan tribe who through an alliance with the English made the Mohegans the leading regional Indian tribe.

He helped launch the career of Shirley Temple, appearing in a series of short films with her in 1933 and 1934. In the shorts, Coghlan played Sonny Rogers, a star baseball player and high school class president. Temple played Coghlan's pesky younger sister, Mary Lou. The Coghlan-Temple titles included Merrily Yours, What's to Do?, Pardon My Pups, and Managed Money.

Coghlan also had large roles in other features through the mid 1930s, including Kentucky Blue Streak, a 1935 crime drama about a jockey who was wrongfully imprisoned and escapes to ride in the Kentucky Derby; The Little Red Schoolhouse, a 1936 drama in which Coghlan plays the lead role, a 17-year-old who runs away to New York City; and Red Lights Ahead, a 1936 comedy in which he plays the son of an eccentric father who invests in a gold mining scheme.

In 1939, Coghlan starred in Blazing Barriers, one of the last roles in which he was billed as Junior Coghlan. He played a young hoodlum from the city who hides out at a Civilian Conservation Corps camp in the mountains. A newspaper story described the physical challenges that faced Coghlan in the role: "If you think being a screen star is a lot of fun, just ask Frank 'Junior' Coghlan." For two days, Coghlan had to pick up Milburn Stone, an actor 50 pounds heavier than Coghlan, and run about 200 yards. In another scene, Coghlan had to jump into a creek and rescue Edward Arnold, Jr. Although both could swim, director Aubrey Scotto wanted realism, and each time Coghlan would try to save the 195-pound (88 kg) Arnold, "both would sink and come up sputtering for breath." In a third scene, Coghlan went into the boxing ring with another actor. The newspaper article noted:

Inasmuch as he doesn't use a double, Coghlan had to insert more realism. That was okay as he is very adept with his fists. Unfortunately the sequence called for Coghlan to take a severe beating. He did.

== Gone with the Wind ==
By the late 1930s, Junior Coghlan was no longer a child actor and parts became harder to find. He played an uncredited role as a "collapsing" Confederate soldier in the 1939 classic Gone with the Wind. In his scene, Coghlan spoke the line "Put me down, put me down, damn ya', I can walk" as he was being carried off the battlefield. Coghlan's scene preceded Clark Gable's famous use of the expletive later in the film, leading Coghlan to boast, "It was the first time the word damn had ever been used in a movie. I used the word before Gable did, but his created a huge flap." Coghlan's line was cut from later prints of the film.

== Adventures of Captain Marvel ==
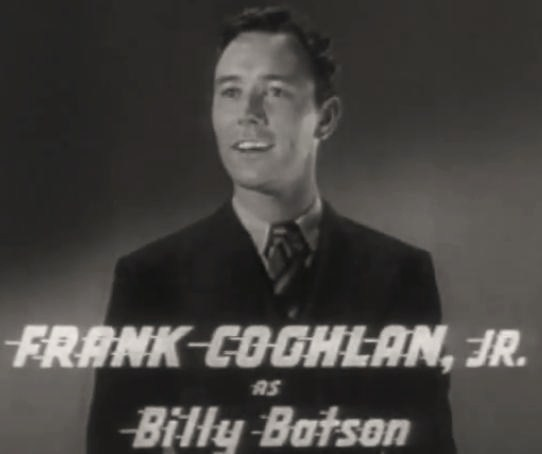
Coghlan in his most famous role as Billy Batson in The Adventures of Captain Marvel.

In 1941, the 25-year-old Coghlan revitalized his career, landing the part of Billy Batson in the Republic Pictures serial Adventures of Captain Marvel. In his role as Batson, Coghlan transformed into Captain Marvel by saying the magic word "Shazam." Whenever he spoke the magic word, a flash and cloud of smoke appeared, with Captain Marvel (played by Tom Tyler) appearing in his place after the smoke cleared. Coghlan recalled, "Every time we did that, they ignited flash powder, which was in a trough in front of me, and if the wind was unkind, I'd get the powder flash in my face and lose some eyebrows." The 12 episodes of the Adventures of Captain Marvel serial "marked the first time a comic book superhero was depicted on the big screen."

When Coghlan was asked to audition for the part of Billy Batson, he later recalled that he "had no idea who Captain Marvel or Billy Batson were." After the audition, he bought a copy of the comic book and said to himself, "Hey, I do kind of look like that kid."

Though Coghlan played more than 100 other parts, his role as Billy Batson led to his most lasting fame. In 1990, the Los Angeles Times published a profile about Coghlan's celebrity under the headline "Shazam! Actor Turning Into Celebrity." The article noted that Coghlan "may be reaching his finest hour" as the continuing popularity of "Captain Marvel" kept Coghlan busy. Coghlan noted at the time:

There's a whole cult of people out there who are fascinated by Captain Marvel. I'm getting invited to a lot more things these days. They think I'm a celebrity.

Coghlan attributed the long-term popularity of the 1941 serial to the fact that the shows were "exciting and fun."

== Naval career ==
During World War II, Coghlan enlisted in the U.S. Navy as a naval aviator. After 23 years as an actor, Coghlan spent the next 23 years in the Navy. In 1954, Hedda Hopper included a report on Coghlan in her newspaper column:

I hope the press didn't miss the arrival of Frank Coghlan, now lieutenant in the USN, and a far cry from Junior Coghlan of the 'Our Gang' comedies. He's assigned to Air Transport Squadron 7 at Hickam Field and will fly the Pacific. Wife Betty and three little Coghlans will live at Oahu so they can see Frank when he returns from his trips to the Orient.

Coghlan achieved the rank of Lieutenant Commander and was often assigned as a liaison and technical advisor on motion pictures, including PT 109, The Caine Mutiny, The Bridges at Toko-Ri, Mister Roberts, and In Harm's Way starring John Wayne. In the 1960s, he was the officer in charge of the navy's Hollywood station.

By the time he retired in 1965, Coghlan had accumulated over 4500 hours of flight time and had flown during World War II and the Korean War and had been to Vietnam.

== Later years ==
After retiring from the navy, Coghlan returned to acting, appearing in motion pictures, television programs, and commercials. His later work included appearances in the television series The Beverly Hillbillies and Dragnet and a small role in the 1966 feature The Sand Pebbles. In 1969, he was hired as the director of planning and development at the Los Angeles College of Optometry. At the time, he lived in Sepulveda in the San Fernando Valley (the area is now known as North Hills) with his wife, Betty, and their five children (sons Michael and Patrick and daughters Libby, Cathy, and Judy). In 1971, Coghlan joined the firm of George Colletta Realty in Sepulveda, working in the listing and sale of residential, income, and commercial real estate. In 1974, he had a cameo role as a zoo employee in 'The Braggart' episode of Shazam!, a live-action CBS television series based upon DC Comics' superhero Captain Marvel.

In 1992, Coghlan wrote an autobiography that was published under the title They Still Call Me Junior.

== Death ==
Coghlan's first wife died in 1974, and his second wife Letha Schwarzrock died in 2001. Coghlan died at the age of 93 at his home at an assisted living facility in Saugus, California, in September 2009. He was survived by a son, three daughters, three stepchildren, and six grandchildren.

== Selected filmography ==
- Daredevil Jack (1920) - Young Boy
- Mid-Channel (1920) - Young Boy (uncredited)
- To Please One Woman (1920)
- The Poverty of Riches (1921)
- Bobbed Hair (1922) - Lamont Child
- Bow Wow (1922) - Child (uncredited)
- Garrison's Finish (1923)
- Our Alley (1923)
- The Fourth Musketeer (1923) - Secondary Child's Role
- Law of the Lawless (1923)
- Little Old New York (1923)
- A Woman of Paris (1923) - Boy (uncredited)
- Cause for Divorce (1923) - Tommie Parker
- The Spanish Dancer (1923) - (uncredited)
- The Darling of New York (1923) - The Ross Kid
- The Great Circus Mystery (1925)
- The Road to Yesterday (1925) - Boy Scout (uncredited)
- The Great Love (1925) - Patrick
- Mike (1926) - Boy
- The Skyrocket (1926) - Mickey (prologue)
- Whispering Smith (1926)
- The Last Frontier (1926) - Buddy
- Her Man o' War (1926) - Peterkin Schultz
- Rubber Tires (1927) - Charley Stack
- Slide, Kelly, Slide (1927) - Mickey Martin
- The Yankee Clipper (1927) - Mickey
- The Country Doctor (1927) - Sard Jones
- A Harp in Hock (1927) - Tommy Shannon
- Let 'Er Go Gallegher (1928) - John 'Let 'Er Go' Gallegher
- Marked Money (1928) - Boy
- Square Shoulders (1929) - John W. 'Tad' Collins Jr.
- The Girl Said No (1930) - Eddie Ward
- River's End (1930) - Mickey O'Toole
- It Pays to Advertise (1931) - Office Boy
- The Public Enemy (1931) - Tom as a Boy (uncredited)
- Penrod and Sam (1931) - Sam
- Union Depot (1932) - Ragged Urchin (uncredited)
- Hell's House (1932) - Shorty
- Man Wanted (1932) - Youngster in Store
- The Last of the Mohicans (1932, Serial) - Uncas
- Drum Taps (1933) - Eric Cartwright
- Racetrack (1933) - Jackie Curtis
- This Day and Age (1933) - Student (uncredited)
- In the Money (1933) - Dick Higginbottom
- Kentucky Blue Streak (1935) - Johnny Bradley
- Alibi Ike (1935) - Jimmy - the Newsboy (uncredited)
- Stranded (1935) - Page (uncredited)
- Happiness C.O.D. (1935) - Larry Sherridan
- The Little Red Schoolhouse (1936) - Frank 'Frankie' Burke
- Charlie Chan at the Race Track (1936) - Eddie Brill
- Make Way for a Lady (1936) - Billy Hopkins
- Red Lights Ahead (1936) - Willie Wallace
- Let Them Live (1937) - Bellhop (uncredited)
- Blazing Barriers (1937) - Tommy McGrath
- Saturday's Heroes (1937) - Sumner - Football Player (uncredited)
- Service de Luxe (1938) - Bellhop
- His Exciting Night (1938) - Office Boy (uncredited)
- Angels with Dirty Faces (1938) - Boy in Pool Room (uncredited)
- Scouts to the Rescue (1939, Serial) - Ken - a Boy Scout
- Off the Record (1939) - Copyboy (uncredited)
- The Story of Vernon and Irene Castle (1939) - Boy in Montage (uncredited)
- The Flying Irishman (1939) - Teenager Taking Photograph (uncredited)
- East Side of Heaven (1939) - Messenger Boy (uncredited)
- Boys' Reformatory (1939) - Eddie O'Meara
- Ex-Champ (1939) - Bellhop (uncredited)
- It's a Wonderful World (1939) - Elevator Boy (uncredited)
- Second Fiddle (1939) - Studio Call Boy (uncredited)
- The Angels Wash Their Faces (1939) - Al - Boy Working Lathe (uncredited)
- Dust Be My Destiny (1939) - Newsboy (uncredited)
- Here I Am a Stranger (1939) - Office Boy (uncredited)
- Meet Dr. Christian (1939) - Bud
- Day-Time Wife (1939) - Office Boy (uncredited)
- Gone with the Wind (1939) - Collapsing Soldier (uncredited)
- The Fighting 69th (1940) - Jimmy (uncredited)
- Double Alibi (1940) - Newspaper Switchboard Operator (uncredited)
- Free, Blonde and 21 (1940) - Sammy - Bellboy
- Star Dust (1940) - Telegraph Boy (uncredited)
- Those Were the Days! (1940) - Chick Struthers (uncredited)
- Golden Gloves (1940) - Kid Lester (uncredited)
- Yesterday's Heroes (1940) - Tiny (uncredited)
- Knute Rockne, All American (1940) - Messenger (uncredited)
- Remedy for Riches (1940) - Bud (uncredited)
- Murder Over New York (1940) - Frank O'Shaughnessy / Gilroy (uncredited)
- Love Thy Neighbor (1940) - Bellboy (uncredited)
- Honeymoon for Three (1941) - Boy Delivering Flowers (uncredited)
- The Man Who Lost Himself (1941) - Messenger Boy (uncredited)
- Adventures of Captain Marvel (1941, Serial) - Billy Batson
- Men of Boys Town (1941) - Frank, a Commissioner (uncredited)
- Out of the Fog (1941) - Newsboy (uncredited)
- Unfinished Business (1941) - Page Boy (uncredited)
- Henry Aldrich for President (1941) - Marvin Bagshaw
- Glamour Boy (1941) - Actor
- Uncle Joe (1941) - Dick
- Pardon My Stripes (1942) - College Boy (uncredited)
- Rings on Her Fingers (1942) - Page Boy (uncredited)
- To the Shores of Tripoli (1942) - Bellboy (uncredited)
- The Courtship of Andy Hardy (1942) - 'Red', Boy at the Dance (uncredited)
- Lady in a Jam (1942) - Young Man (uncredited)
- Wings for the Eagle (1942) - Mail Boy with Telegram (uncredited)
- Footlight Serenade (1942) - Movie Theatre Usher (uncredited)
- Girl Trouble (1942) - Elevator Boy (uncredited)
- Youth on Parade (1942) - Student (uncredited)
- Andy Hardy's Double Life (1942) - Red, One of the Gang (uncredited)
- Presenting Lily Mars (1943) - Elevator Boy (uncredited)
- Follow the Band (1943) - Bert
- This Is the Army (1943) - Soldier at Camp (uncredited)
- Corvette K-225 (1943) - Rating (uncredited)
- One More Tomorrow (1946) - Telegraph Boy (uncredited)
- When the Boys Meet the Girls (1965) - Man in Audience (uncredited)
- The Sand Pebbles (1966) - Bald Bespectacled Man at Red Kettle Bar (uncredited)
- The Love-Ins (1967) - Reporter in Park (uncredited)
- Valley of the Dolls (1967) - Reporter (uncredited)
- The Shakiest Gun in the West (1968) - Man at Bar (uncredited)
- The Love God? (1969) - Reporter (uncredited)
