= Lillian Knight (silent film actress) =

American actress

Lillian Knight was an American actress who appeared in silent films.

She was from Texas. She won second place in an Atlantic City beauty pageant in 1924 as "Miss Los Angeles". She was selected by casting director Sandy Roth.

She was married to Clarence Earl Knight; they were reportedly divorcing in 1924.

Knight turned down an offer to appear in the Ziegfeld Follies. She was injured in a stunt fall from a horse and was unable to work for two years.

She presented Jackie Coogan with a basket of flowers upon his return from a trip in 1924.

She appeared in Feet of Clay (1924) and played Miss California in The Auction Block (1926). Her final known film is The Student Prince in Old Heidelberg (1927).

== Filmography ==
- Feet of Clay (1924)
- Bashful Jim (1925)
- Skinners in Silk (1925)
- Super-Hooper-Dyne Lizzies (1925) as Minnie Watts
- The Auction Block (1926)
- Stage Madness (1927) as French Maid
- The Student Prince in Old Heidelberg (1927)
