= Easy Come, Easy Go (1947 film) =

1947 film directed by John Farrow

Easy Come, East Go
- Directed by: John Farrow
- Written by: Francis Edward Faragoh; Anne Froelick; John McNulty
- Produced by: Kenneth Macgowan
- Starring: Barry Fitzgerald; Diana Lynn; Sonny Tufts
- Cinematography: Daniel L. Fapp
- Edited by: Thomas Scott; Eda Warren
- Music by: Roy Webb
- Production company: Paramount Pictures
- Distributed by: Paramount Pictures
- Release date: March 7, 1947
- Running time: 77 minutes
- Country: United States
- Language: English
- Box office: $1 million

Easy Come, Easy Go is a 1947 American comedy drama film directed by John Farrow and starring Barry Fitzgerald, Diana Lynn and Sonny Tufts. It was produced and distributed by Hollywood studio Paramount Pictures.

== Plot ==
Martin Donovan's compulsive gambling leaves him constantly broke and under arrest from a gambling-house raid. He also places bets for tenants of his boardinghouse, who lose their money and ability to pay the rent.

Martin's daughter, Connie, is courted by cabbie Kevin O'Connor and cop Dale Whipple while her dad fears losing her. Kevin wins her heart, but loses every cent due to taking Martin's betting advice. When the two men are arrested, a disgusted Connie bails them out but leaves Kevin for the more responsible Dale.

Tim Donovan, brother of Martin, has a job with the police as a diver. He and Martin come upon a sunken treasure, but Martin, whose philosophy is "easy come, easy go," promptly squanders all the loot. Not knowing what else to do, Connie tries to solve her dad's debts by taking bets on a horse race. Dale ends up arresting her. The horse wins, but it takes a car accident for Martin to finally see the light and the error of his ways.

== Cast ==
- Barry Fitzgerald as Martin L. Donovan
- Diana Lynn as Connie Donovan
- Sonny Tufts as Kevin O'Connor
- Dick Foran as Dale Whipple
- Frank McHugh as Carey
- Allen Jenkins as Nick
- John Litel as Tom Clancy
- Arthur Shields as Timothy Mike Donovan
- Frank Faylen as Boss
- James Burke as Harry Weston
- George Cleveland as Gilligan
- Ida Moore as Angela Orange
- Rhys Williams as Priest
