= Craig's Wife =

1925 play written by American playwright George Kelly

- First edition 1926
- Original language: English
- Written by: George Kelly
- Characters: Billy Birkmire; Harry; Mazie; Mrs. Harriet Craig; Mrs. Frazier; Eugene Fredericks; Ethel Landreth; Joseph Catelle; Miss Irene Austen; Walter Craig; Mrs. Harold
- Genre: Drama
- Setting: The Reception Room at the Home of Mr. and Mrs. Walter Craig

Premiere
- Date: October 12, 1925
- Place: Morosco Theatre; New York City, New York, US

Craig's Wife is a 1925 play written by American playwright George Kelly. It won the 1926 Pulitzer Prize for Drama, and has been adapted for three feature films.

== Production ==
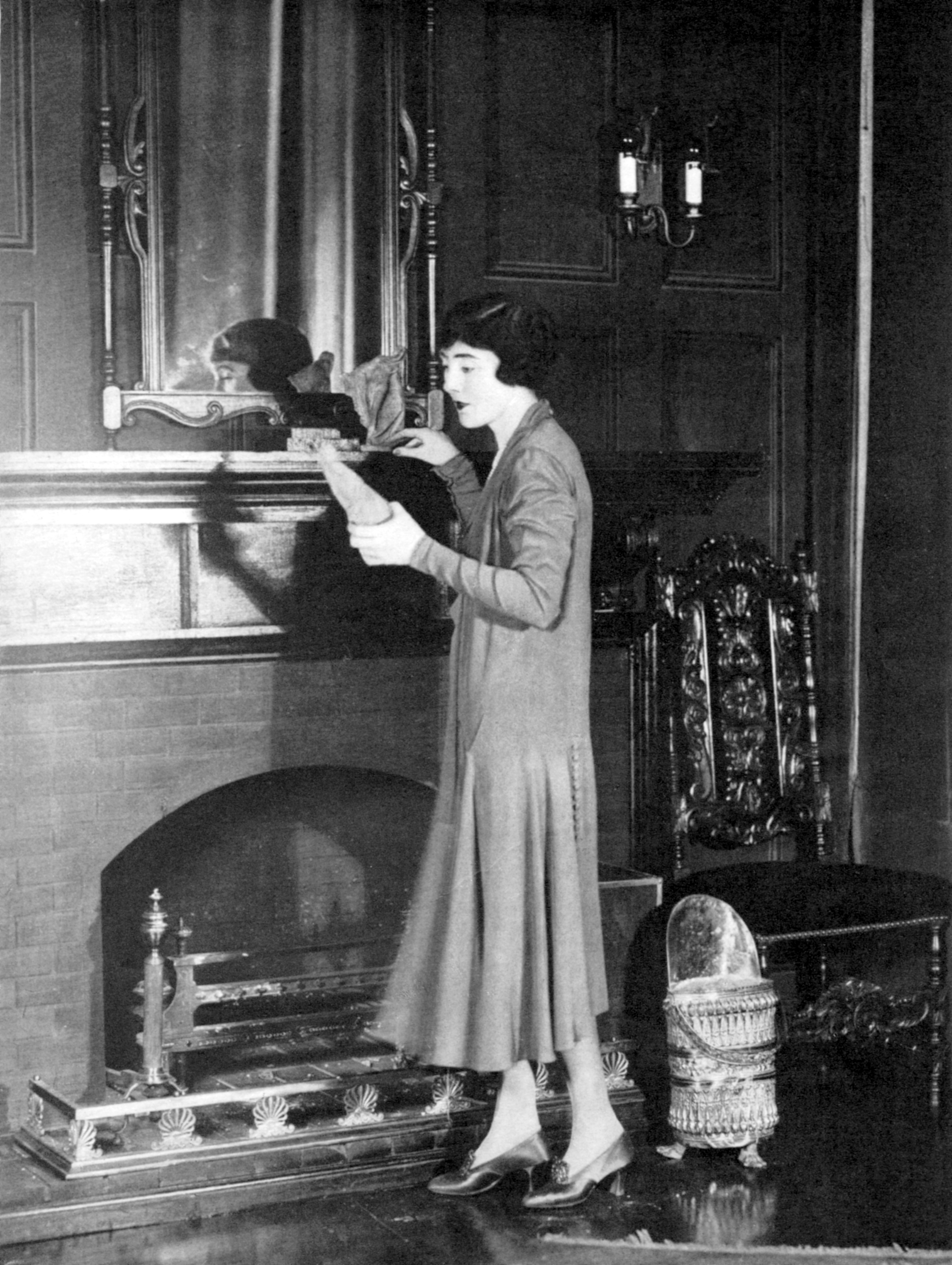
Chrystal Herne in the original Broadway production of Craig's Wife (1925)

Craig's Wife premiered on Broadway at the Morosco Theatre on October 12, 1925, and closed on August 21, 1926, after 360 performances. Directed by playwright Kelly, the cast featured Chrystal Herne as Harriet Craig, Anne Sutherland (Miss Austen), Charles Trowbridge (Walter Craig), and Josephine Hull (Mrs. Frazier).

It was included in Burns Mantle's The Best Plays of 1925–1926.

The play received the 1926 Pulitzer Prize for Drama. The Pulitzer committee wrote, "Craig's Wife has been selected by the jury on account of the dignity of its theme, the soundness of its construction, the excellence of its dialogue, and its effectiveness in the theater."

== Broadway revival ==
The play was revived in 1947 in the Playhouse Theatre with Judith Evelyn in the title role. It opened on February 12 and closed on April 12 after 69 performances.

== Film adaptations ==
There have been at least three films based on the play. The 1928 silent version was directed by William C. deMille, Cecil's brother, and starred Irene Rich in the title role. In 1936, Columbia Pictures made a film adaptation with Rosalind Russell as Harriet Craig. The 1950 film Harriet Craig, featuring Joan Crawford, was also based on the play.

== Radio adaptations ==
Cecil B. deMille produced Craig's Wife on the Lux Radio Theatre in Hollywood in 1936. It featured Rosalind Russell and Herbert Marshall. Orson Welles's The Campbell Playhouse performed the play on CBS Radio, airing March 10, 1940. This version featured Welles as Walter Craig, and Ann Harding as Harriet Craig.
