= Square Shoulders =

1929 film

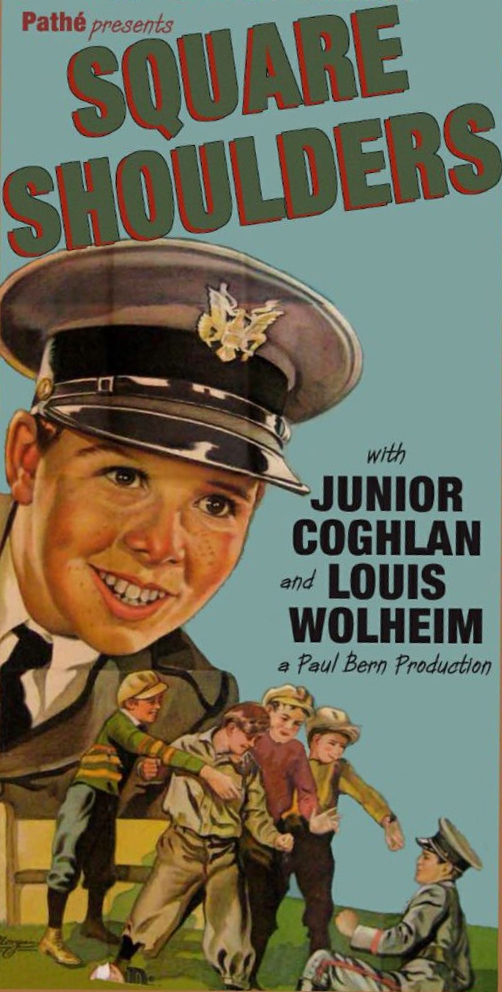
- Directed by: E. Mason Hopper
- Written by: George Dromgold; Houston Branch; Peggy Prior; John W. Krafft
- Produced by: Paul Bern
- Starring: Frank Coghlan Jr. Louis Wolheim; Anita Louise
- Cinematography: David Abel
- Edited by: Barbara Hunter
- Music by: Josiah Zuro
- Production company: Pathé Exchange
- Distributed by: Pathé Exchange
- Release date: March 10, 1929
- Running time: 58 minutes
- Country: United States
- Language: Silent (English intertitles)

Square Shoulders is a 1929 American silent crime drama film directed by E. Mason Hopper and starring Frank Coghlan Jr., Louis Wolheim, and Anita Louise.

== Synopsis ==
After returning from fighting in World War I, a man falls into bad company with some criminals. Sometime later he returns to his hometown and discovers that his wife has died and his son Tad is now an orphan. He raises the funds to send Tad to a military school without letting him know his true identity. When his former criminal associates blackmail him into taking part in a robbery of the school, they are confronted by Tad. His father takes a bullet intended for him and dies.

== Cast ==
- Frank Coghlan Jr. as John W. 'Tad' Collins Jr.
- Louis Wolheim as John 'Slag' Collins
- Philippe De Lacy as Eddie Cartwright
- Anita Louise as Mary Jane Williams
- C. Montague Shaw as B.T. Cartwright
- Maurice Black as Hook
- Kewpie Morgan as Delicate Don
- Clarence Geldert as Maj. E.H. Williams - Commandant

== See also ==
- List of early sound feature films (1926–1929)

== Bibliography ==
- Munden, Kenneth White. The American Film Institute Catalog of Motion Pictures Produced in the United States, Part 1. University of California Press, 1997.
