= Behind the Make-Up =

1930 film

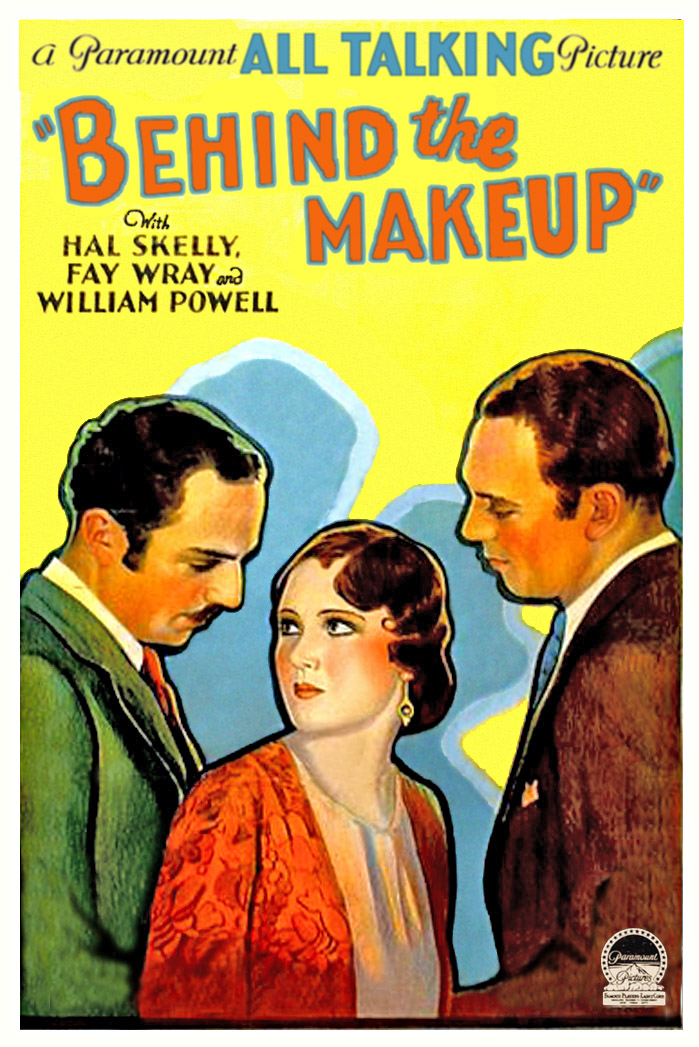
- Film poster
- Directed by: Robert Milton; Dorothy Arzner (uncredited)
- Written by: Mildred Cram (story); Howard Estabrook; George Manker Watters
- Produced by: Monta Bell
- Starring: Hal Skelly; William Powell; Fay Wray; Kay Francis
- Cinematography: Charles Lang
- Edited by: Doris Drought
- Music by: W. Franke Harling; John Leipold
- Production company: Paramount Pictures
- Release date: January 18, 1930
- Running time: 65-70 minutes
- Country: United States
- Language: English

Behind the Make-Up is a 1930 American pre-Code drama film directed by Robert Milton and Dorothy Arzner (who was uncredited), and based on the short story "The Feeder" by Mildred Cram. The film stars Hal Skelly, William Powell, Kay Francis, and Fay Wray.

This was the first of seven in which Powell and Francis co-starred, the others being Street of Chance (1930), Paramount on Parade (1930), For the Defense (1930), Ladies' Man (1931), Jewel Robbery (1932), and One Way Passage (1932).

== Plot ==
Behind the Make-Up (1930)

Good-natured vaudeville clown Hap Brown befriends Gardoni, a vain but penniless comedian contemplating suicide. Trying to help him out, Gardoni initially dismisses Hap's ideas but ultimately steals them and goes on his own to find success. When they meet again, Gardoni takes Hap as a partner in his show, but woos away Hap's girlfriend Marie and marries her. Soon after, as Hap and Marie try to deal with Gardoni's shabby treatment of them, he pursues an extramarital affair with the worldlier, wealthier socialite Kitty, with whom he also racks up a significant gambling debt.

== Cast ==
- Hal Skelly as Hap Brown
- William Powell as Gardoni
- Fay Wray as Marie Gardoni
- Kay Francis as Kitty Parker
- E. H. Calvert as Dawson
- Paul Lukas as Boris
- Jean De Briac as Sculptor
- Torben Meyer as Waiter

== Critical reception ==
Mordaunt Hall, film critic of The New York Times, praised the performances of Powell ("excellent"), Wray ("pleasing"), Skelly ("goes about his part with earnestness and intelligence"), and Francis ("does nicely"), but noted "the story is rather limp and disappointing."

== Bibliography ==
- Mayne, Judith. Directed by Dorothy Arzner. Indiana University Press, 1995
