= Craig's Wife (1928 film) =

1928 film

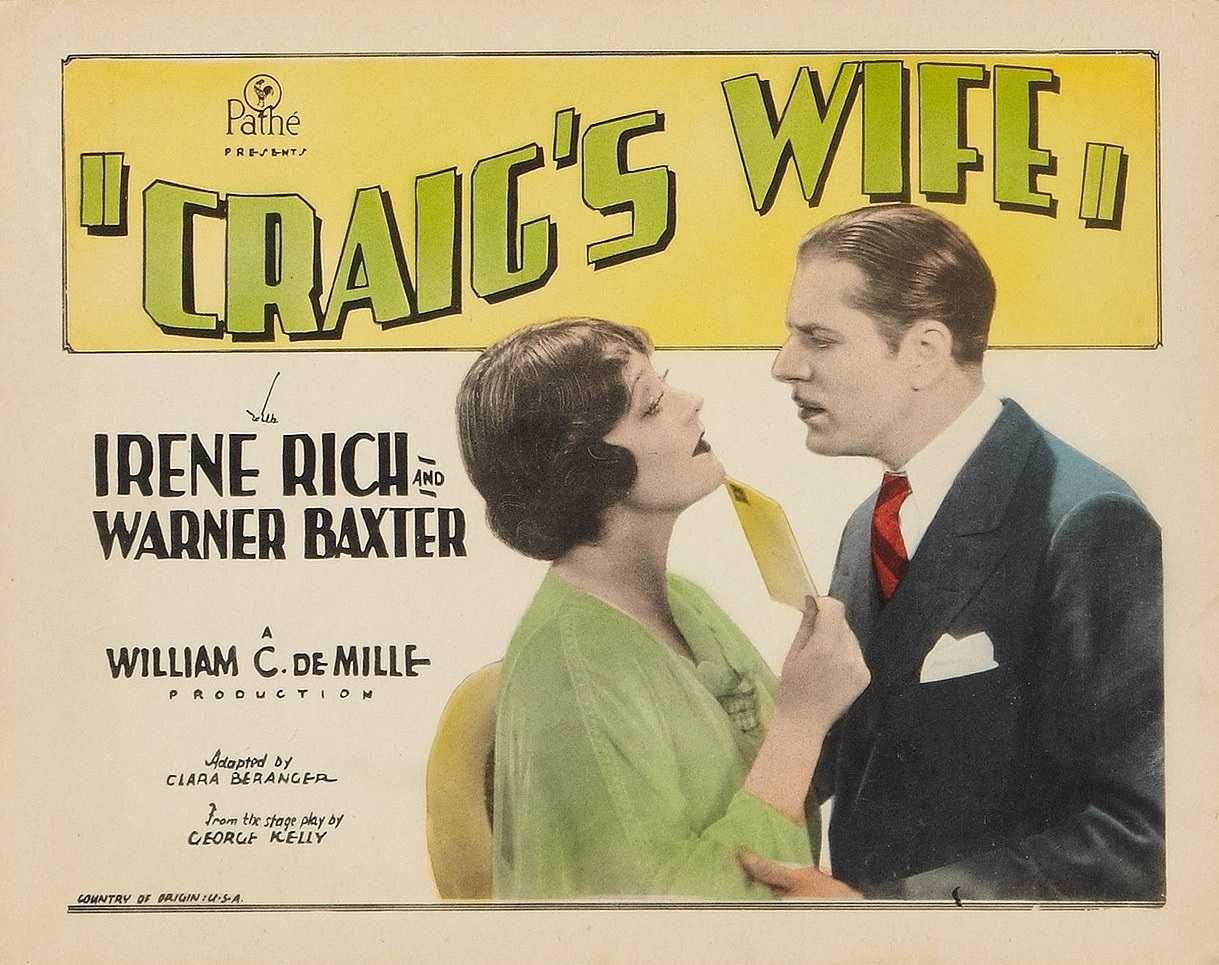
- Lobby card
- Directed by: William C. deMille
- Written by: Clara Beranger
- Starring: Irene Rich; Warner Baxter; Virginia Bradford
- Cinematography: David Abel
- Edited by: Anne Bauchens
- Production company: Pathé Exchange
- Distributed by: Pathé Exchange
- Release date: September 16, 1928
- Running time: 70 minutes
- Country: United States
- Languages: Silent; English intertitles

Craig's Wife is a 1928 American silent drama film directed by William C. deMille and starring Irene Rich, Warner Baxter and Virginia Bradford. It was based on the 1925 play Craig's Wife by George Kelly. Subsequent film adaptations followed in 1936 as Craig's Wife and 1950 as Harriet Craig.

The film's sets were designed by the art director Edward C. Jewell.

== Cast ==
- Irene Rich as Mrs. Craig
- Warner Baxter as Walter Craig
- Virginia Bradford as Ethel
- Carroll Nye as John Fredericks
- Lilyan Tashman as Mrs. Passmore
- George Irving as Mr. Passmore
- Jane Keckley as Miss Austen
- Mabel Van Buren as Mrs. Frazer
- Ethel Wales as Eliza
- Rada Rae as Mary
- Mary Emery

== Preservation ==
With no prints of Craig's Wife located in any film archives, it is considered a lost film.

== Bibliography ==
- Goble, Alan. The Complete Index to Literary Sources in Film. Walter de Gruyter, 1999.
