= Miss Susie Slagle's =

1946 film by John Berry

- Directed by: John Berry
- Written by: Hugo Butler; Anne Froelick; Adrian Scott; Theodore Strauss
- Story by: Augusta Tucker (Novel)
- Produced by: John Houseman
- Starring: Veronica Lake; Sonny Tufts; Lillian Gish
- Cinematography: Charles Lang
- Edited by: Archie Marshek
- Music by: Daniele Amfitheatrof
- Production company: Paramount Pictures
- Distributed by: Paramount Pictures
- Release date: February 6, 1946
- Running time: 88 minutes
- Country: United States
- Language: English

Miss Susie Slagle's is a 1946 American drama film directed by John Berry. It was based on the popular novel by Augusta Tucker. The film was Berry's directorial debut and first starring role for Joan Caulfield.

== Plot ==
A nursing student falls in love with a young medical intern in 1910 Baltimore, but their lives start to fall apart when he catches a deadly disease.

== Cast ==
Actor	Role
Veronica Lake	Nan Rogers
Sonny Tufts	Pug Prentiss
Joan Caulfield	Margaretta Howe
Lillian Gish	Miss Susie Slagle
Lloyd Bridges	Silas Holmes
Bill Edwards	Elijah Howe Jr.
Billy De Wolfe	Ben Mead

== Production ==
=== Original novel ===
Augusta Tucker's novel was published in 1939. Paramount paid $20,000 for the film rights. The novel became a best seller. A sequel came out in 1942, The Man Miss Susie Loved.

=== Development ===
In 1939 Martin Berkley was assigned to write the script. John Cromwell was assigned to direct under the supervision of Arthur Hornblow.

In January 1941 Paramount announced Jean Arthur would star and Sam Wood would produce and direct with Lorraine Nobel writing a script. Jack Oakie was to play the comic male lead. In May 1941 Irene Dunne was named as lead. In June 1941 filming was postponed so Wood could make For Whom the Bell Tolls.

=== John Houseman ===
In August 1943 the project was reactivated when Paramount head of production Buddy DeSylva have it to producer John Houseman, who had just made The Unseen for the studio.

In January 1944 the project was officially put back on Paramount's schedule with a new screenplay done (Hugo Butler was borrowed from MGM to do this) and Betty Field listed as star. The novel was set in Baltimore at Johns Hopkins Hospital but references to that specific city and hospital were removed from the script.

=== Director ===
It was thought Houseman might get Orson Welles involved as a star or director. However Welles did not have anything to do with the film.

At one stage Harold Clurman was going to direct – he worked on the script – but left the project and in May 1944 signed a contract with RKO.

In June the job of directing was given to theatre director John Berry, who had worked with Houseman and Welles in the theatre. He had never made a movie before but Berry spent a number of months at Paramount observing other directors and filming screen tests to get experience.

=== Casting ===
In April 1944 Sonny Tufts was signed for the male lead. Lillian Gish also joined the cast, making her first film in a number of years. In July Joan Caulfield, who had enjoyed Broadway success in Kiss and Tell, was given the female lead, in her motion picture debut. Veronica Lake joined the cast in August, along with Pat Phelan, who had been discovered doing theatre. Lake later said her role – along with ones in The Blue Dahlia, Out of this World and Hold That Blonde were "not noteworthy."

=== Shooting ===
Filming took place in November 1944. At one stage the film was going to be called The Golden Years but the title was changed back. "I did 54 takes on my first shot", remembered Berry years later.

== Critical reception ==
Bosley Crowther of The New York Times thought the film was flawed but decent:

One would refrain from recommending Miss Susie Slagle's as a fine drama of medical school. But it is a cheerful, nostalgic and personally engaging little picture of fabricated life.

Diabolique called it "utterly delightful" with "charming performances from Sonny Tufts and Joan Caulfield (not making that up, both are genuinely beguiling)" although Lake "isn’t very good: she never seems comfortable and, painful as this is to admit, is one of the worst things about the movie."

== Radio adaptation ==
Miss Susie Slagle's was presented on Lux Radio Theatre October 21, 1946. Caulfield reprised her role from the film, and William Holden co-starred.

== TV Adaptation ==
The story was adapted for Lux Video Theatre in 1955 with Dorothy McGuire.
