= The Country Doctor (1927 film) =

1927 film

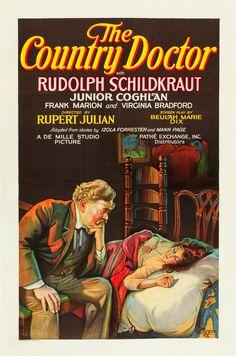
- Directed by: Rupert Julian
- Written by: Beulah Marie Dix
- Based on: a story by Izola Forrester
- Produced by: De Mille Pictures Corp.
- Starring: Rudolph Schildkraut
- Cinematography: Peverell Marley
- Edited by: Claude Berkeley
- Distributed by: Pathé Exchange
- Release date: August 22, 1927
- Running time: 80 minutes
- Country: United States
- Language: Silent (English intertitles)

The Country Doctor is a 1927 American silent film directed by Rupert Julian and starring Rudolph Schildkraut. It was produced by Cecil B. DeMille and distributed by Pathé Exchange.

== Cast ==
- Rudolph Schildkraut - Dr. Amos Rinker
- Frank Coghlan Jr. - Sard Jones
- Sam De Grasse - Ira Harding
- Virginia Bradford - Opal Jones
- Gladys Brockwell - Myra Jones
- Francis Marion - Joe Harding
- Jane Keckley - Abbie Harding
- Louis Natheaux - Sidney Fall
- Ethel Wales - Redora Bump
- Carmencita Johnson - Baby (*uncredited)

== Preservation status ==
- Copies are held by several US and European archives.
