= The Show-Off (1946 film) =

1946 film by Harry Beaumont

- Directed by: Harry Beaumont
- Screenplay by: George Wells
- Based on: The Show-Off by George Kelly
- Produced by: Albert Lewis
- Starring: Red Skelton; Marilyn Maxwell; Marjorie Main
- Cinematography: Robert H. Planck
- Edited by: Douglass Biggs
- Music by: David Snell
- Production company: Metro-Goldwyn-Mayer
- Distributed by: Loew's Inc.
- Release date: December 1946
- Running time: 83 minutes
- Country: United States
- Language: English
- Budget: $863,000
- Box office: $2,379,000

The Show-Off is a 1946 American comedy film directed by Harry Beaumont based on the play of the same name by George Kelly. It stars Red Skelton and Marilyn Maxwell. It was previously filmed in 1926 as The Show-Off starring Ford Sterling, Lois Wilson and Louise Brooks and in 1934 as The Show-Off with Spencer Tracy and Madge Evans. Lois Wilson also appeared in the 1934 version, but in a different role.

== Plot ==
Amy Fisher's parents can't understand what their daughter sees in Aubrey Piper, a loudmouth and braggart who pretends to be more than the lowly clerk he is.

She marries Aubrey even though he can't seem to stop insulting others or interfering with their lives. He accidentally sets her inventor brother Joe's laboratory on fire and also wrecks a car, driving it without a license. He is kicked off a radio show for offending the sponsor and blows Joe's deal with a paint company by demanding the inventor be paid $100,000.

Things go from bad to worse as Amy and Aubrey move in with her parents. In the end, though, a change of heart from the paint company's boss seals Joe's deal and Aubrey gets the credit, pleasing everyone.

== Cast ==
- Red Skelton as J. Aubrey Piper
- Marilyn Maxwell as Amy Fisher Piper
- Marjorie Main as Mrs. Fisher
- Marshall Thompson as Joe
- Virginia O'Brien as Hortense
- Eddie 'Rochester' Anderson as Eddie
- George Cleveland as Pop Fisher
- Leon Ames as Frank Harlin
- Marshall Thompson as Joe Fisher
- Jacqueline White as Clara Harlin
- Wilson Wood as Horace Adems
- Lila Leeds as Flo
- Emory Parnell as Mr. Appelton
- Francis Pierlot as Judge Ederman
- Russell Hicks as Mr. Thorbison
- Byron Foulger as Mr. Jenkins
- Frank Orth as Mr. Kopec
- Ida Moore as Mrs. Ascot
- Grady Sutton as Mr. Hotchkiss
- Charles Lane as Quiz Master
- Al Hill as Taxi Driver

== Crew ==
- David Townsend - Art Director

== Reception ==
The film earned $1,928,000 in the US and Canada and $451,000 elsewhere resulting in a profit of $723,000.

== Radio adaptations ==
The Show-Off was presented on Lux Radio Theater in 1935 starring Joe E. Brown and 1943 starring Harold "Great Gildersleeve" Peary, Una Merkel, and Beulah Bondi, with slightly altered plot lines. Theatre Guild on the Air presented a one-hour adaptation on February 22, 1953, starring Paul Douglas and Jan Sterling.
