= Ethel Wales =

American actress of Hollywood films

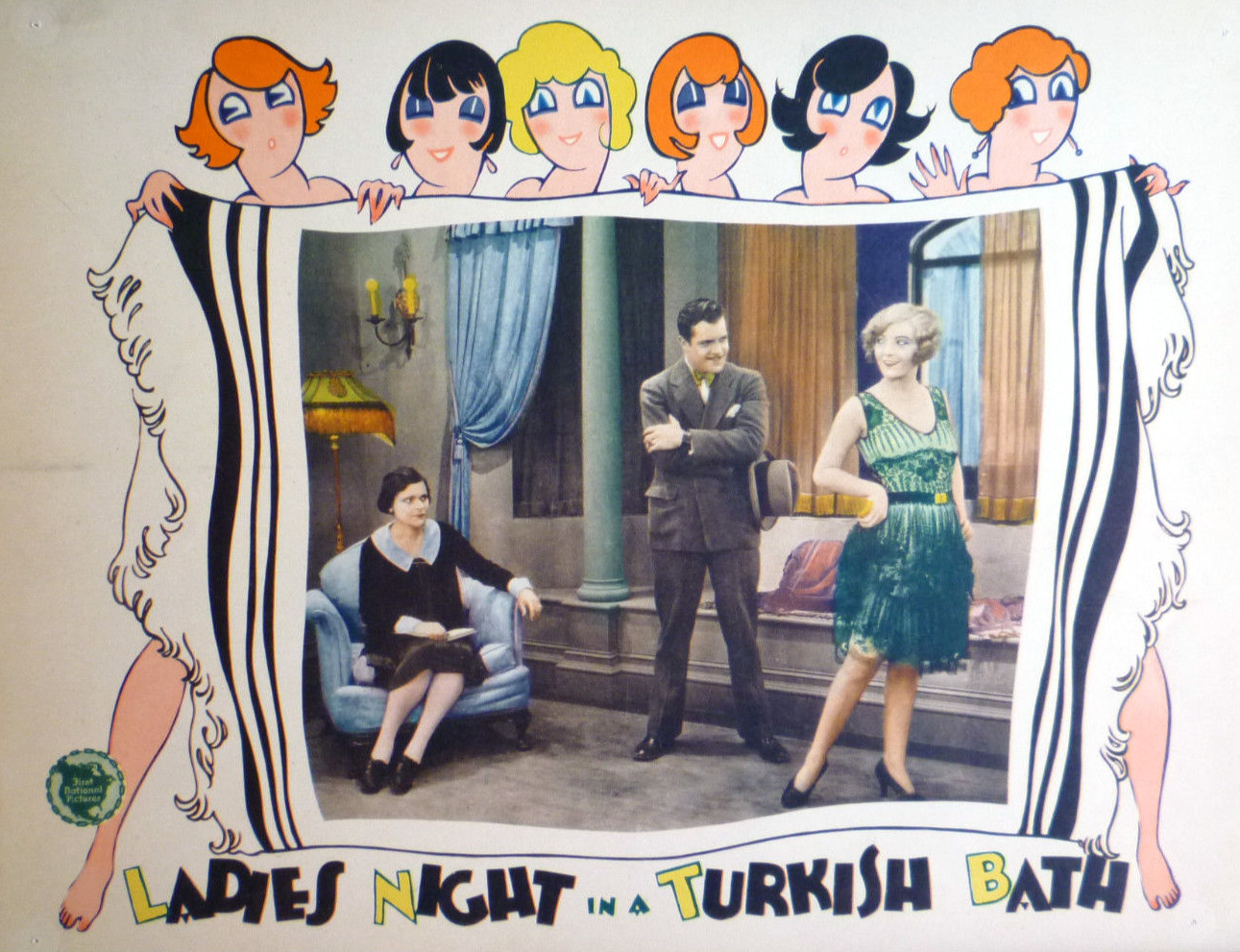
- Wales (left) on lobby card for Ladies' Night in a Turkish Bath, 1928
- Born: April 4, 1878; Passaic, New Jersey, U.S.
- Died: February 15, 1952 (aged 73); Hollywood, California, U.S.
- Occupation: Actress
- Years active: 1920–1950
- Spouses: Wellington E. Wales (died 1966); Hal Taliaferro; John W. Stockton (m. 1933)
- Children: 1

Ethel Wales (April 4, 1878 – February 15, 1952) was an American actress who appeared in more than 130 films during her 30-year career.

== Biography ==
Born in 1878 in Passaic, New Jersey, Wales graduated from "Wisconsin university".

Wales had a multifaceted professional relationship with Cecil DeMille and William deMille, beginning with her acting in their plays in the eastern United States. When the brothers moved to Hollywood and began working with films, Wales was their secretary and casting director. In 1927, Cecil De Mille signed her to a long-term contract to act in films. Her first film for Cecil DeMille was The Whispering Chorus (1918).

She was the first wife of Wellington E. Wales, Mary Pickford's business manager during the height of her popularity. The couple had one son, Wellington Charles Wales, an editorial writer for The New York Times, who died of a heart attack shortly after his 19-year-old son Samuel was killed in a train mishap. Wales's second husband was actor Hal Taliaferro.

On October 23, 1933, Wales married retired businessman John W. Stockton in Yuma, Arizona.

== Partial filmography ==
- Midsummer Madness (1921)
- After the Show (1921)
- Miss Lulu Bett (1921)
- Our Leading Citizen (1922)
- The Bonded Woman (1922)
- Nice People (1922)
- Manslaughter (1922)
- The Covered Wagon (1923)
- The Marriage Maker (1923)
- Stepping Fast (1923)
- Loving Lies (1924)
- The White Sin (1924)
- Which Shall It Be? (1924)
- The Wedding Song (1925)
- Don't (1925)
- The Monster (1925)
- The Rag Man (1925)
- Let Women Alone (1925)
- Shattered Lives (1925)
- Go Straight (1925)
- Steppin' Out (1925)
- Wandering Footsteps (1925)
- Made for Love (1926)
- Take It from Me (1926)
- The Unknown Soldier (1926)
- Cradle Snatchers (1927)
- Stage Kisses (1927)
- The Satin Woman (1927)
- The Girl in the Pullman (1927)
- The Country Doctor (1927)
- The Wreck of the Hesperus (1927)
- Ladies' Night in a Turkish Bath (1928)
- On to Reno (1928)
- The Perfect Crime (1928)
- Tenth Avenue (1928)
- Craig's Wife (1928)
- Taxi 13 (1928)
- The Donovan Affair (1929)
- The Saturday Night Kid (1929)
- The Dude Wrangler (1930)
- Under Montana Skies (1930)
- Tom Sawyer (1930) - Mrs. Harper
- The Criminal Code (1931)
- Maker of Men (1931)
- The Fighting Fool (1932)
- Love in High Gear (1932)
- The Thirteenth Guest (1932)
- A Man's Land (1932)
- The Fighting Parson (1933)
- The Important Witness (1933)
- Easy Millions (1933)
- The Big Bluff (1933)
- The Gladiator (1938)
- In Old Caliente (1939)
- Smash-Up: The Story of a Woman (1947) (uncredited)
