= Harriet Craig =

1950 film

- Original film poster
- Directed by: Vincent Sherman
- Screenplay by: Anne Froelick; James Gunn
- Based on: Craig's Wife; 1925 play by George Kelly
- Produced by: William Dozier
- Starring: Joan Crawford; Wendell Corey
- Cinematography: Joseph Walker
- Edited by: Viola Lawrence
- Music by: George Duning
- Color process: Black and white
- Production company: Columbia Pictures
- Distributed by: Columbia Pictures
- Release date: November 2, 1950 (New York City)
- Running time: 94 minutes
- Country: United States
- Language: English

Harriet Craig is a 1950 American drama film starring Joan Crawford. The screenplay by Anne Froelick and James Gunn was based upon the Pulitzer Prize-winning 1925 play Craig's Wife, by George Kelly. The film was directed by Vincent Sherman, produced by William Dozier, and distributed by Columbia Pictures. Harriet Craig is the second of three cinematic collaborations between Sherman and Crawford, the others being The Damned Don't Cry (1950) and Goodbye, My Fancy (1951).

== Plot ==
Harriet Craig is a neurotic, manipulative, and controlling perfectionist. She is obsessed with maintaining her ideal of perfection in the appearance of her home, her social life, and herself. She seems to believe that those around her exist only to fulfill her ideal life. Achieving this goal makes life miserable for everyone around her. Harriet shares her home with her loving husband Walter, her orphaned and grateful cousin Clare, and two maids – one of whom has worked at the house since Walter was a child. Harriet and Walter do not have any children as Harriet has told Walter that she is unable to conceive. Before marrying Walter and becoming the "lady" of his family's home, Harriet had a difficult life which included a philandering father. This caused her to be hateful and distrustful of men.

Harriet is rude to the two maids and bullies the nervous one, eventually firing her, and driving the other, who has been with Walter all his life, to quit. She keeps Walter's friends away from the home, including his best friend Billy Birkmire, and instead invites over stodgier, older couples whom she feels are more suited to her attitudes, and who can further her husband's career and her social aspirations. When Clare falls in love with Walter's co-worker, Wes Miller, Harriet puts an end to the romance with lies. When it appears Walter, a sound engineer, will receive a coveted work assignment that will require him to travel abroad without her, she sabotages the plans with treacherous lies to his boss.

Eventually, everyone learns the truth about Harriet. Clare overhears Harriet admitting to Walter that she lied to sabotage Clare's relationship. As a result, Clare packs and leaves, as she would rather survive alone in the world than live with manipulative Harriet. Walter deduces that it was Harriet who convinced his boss to cancel his work assignment. As a reaction to this, and to the realization of what his life with Harriet has become, he symbolically throws off her control: he drinks straight liquor, makes himself comfortable on the pristine sofa and, when she refuses to come downstairs to discuss their situation, he intentionally smashes Harriet's most beloved household possession – a valuable Ming vase that symbolizes her control and obsession with perfection. When Harriet finally admits to Walter that she lied about the long-term maid, lied to his boss, and has lied to him throughout their marriage about her inability to have children, he walks out, leaving Harriet alone with her one true love and the only thing that she can truly control – the house.

== Cast ==
- Joan Crawford as Harriet Craig
- Wendell Corey as Walter Craig
- Lucile Watson as Celia Fenwick
- Allyn Joslyn as Billy Birkmire
- William Bishop as Wes Miller
- K. T. Stevens as Clare Raymond
- Viola Roache as Mrs. Harold
- Raymond Greenleaf as Henry Fenwick
- Ellen Corby as Lottie (Note: The supporting cast includes prolific character actress Ellen Corby as a bullied maid. Corby later became widely known as Esther "Grandma" Walton on the popular TV series The Waltons for seven seasons beginning in 1972.)

== Production ==
The film was based on the 1925 play Craig's Wife by George Kelly. Two previous film versions were both entitled Craig's Wife, the first a 1928 silent film directed by William C. DeMille (Cecil B. DeMille's brother), and the second a 1936 film directed by Dorothy Arzner and starring Rosalind Russell.

The film's working title was The Lady of the House.

== Reception ==
Variety commented: "Joan Crawford does a prime job of putting over the selfish title-character." Otis Guernsey of the New York Herald Tribune wrote: "[Crawford] remains, as always, a stylish performer in her clear and forceful characterization."

The film was not a box-office success and did not reach the $1,250,000 minimum of Variety's top earning films of the year.

== Home media ==
The film has been released on VHS home video. As of November 2012, it was available on Region 1 DVD through the TCM Vault Collection and Region 2 DVD (Japan, Europe, South Africa, and the Middle East, including Egypt).
