= Craig's Wife (1936 film) =

1936 film by Dorothy Arzner

- Theatrical release poster
- Directed by: Dorothy Arzner
- Written by: Mary C. McCall Jr.
- Based on: Craig's Wife; 1925 play by George Kelly
- Produced by: Harry Cohn
- Starring: Rosalind Russell; John Boles; Billie Burke
- Cinematography: Lucien Ballard
- Edited by: Viola Lawrence
- Music by: R.H. Bassett; Emil Gerstenberger; Milan Roder
- Production company: Columbia Pictures
- Distributed by: Columbia Pictures
- Release date: September 25, 1936
- Running time: 74 minutes
- Country: United States
- Language: English

Craig's Wife is a 1936 American drama film starring Rosalind Russell as a domineering wife. It was based on the Pulitzer Prize-winning 1925 Broadway play of the same name by George Kelly (the uncle of Grace Kelly), and directed by Dorothy Arzner. Former MGM star William Haines was the film's production designer. Previously filmed in 1928, Craig's Wife was remade in 1950 as Harriet Craig, rewritten (and updated) as a vehicle for Joan Crawford and co-starring Wendell Corey.

== Plot ==
In Rye, New York, Walter Craig's wife Harriet is out of town visiting her sick sister Lillian. His aunt Ellen Austen lives with them. While Harriet is away, Walter parties with his friend Fergus Passmore, though their friend Billy Birkmire cancels his engagement due to his father arriving unexpectedly. Meanwhile, Harriet decides her sister will recover quickly if left alone, and boards a train back home with her niece Ethel Landreth. During the ride, Harriet dismisses the notion of romantic love, claiming to have married Walter for her own independence. She also manages the household and the domestics through strict supervision.

Just as Harriet returns to the house, Mazie and Mrs. Harold (the maid and the housekeeper) see in the newspaper that Fergus Passmore and his wife were found dead in their home. As soon as Harriet enters the house, she sends Ethel to bed and returns to supervising everyone. She discovers a message on a table. It is the phone number Walter left for the housekeeper to give to anyone who called for him while he was out the previous night. Harriet calls the phone operators for the name and address to "Levering 3100," the number on the note. However, they are forbidden to answer her inquiry. Because "Levering 3100" is under police observation, the chief operator contacts the police to inform them that someone has called to find out whose number it is, and gives them the Craigs' phone number.

Walter arrives and reconnects with Harriet, who inquires about the flowers left behind by their neighbor, Mrs. Frazier. While searching in the phone directory, Harriet learns "Levering 3100" is Fergus Passmore's phone number. As Mrs. Frazier leaves, Harriet asks Ellen when Mrs. Frazier arrived and how she got into the house. Ellen criticizes Harriet's domineering and states that she is leaving the next day to travel the world. But before she leaves, she warns Walter about his wife's dominance over him. However, Walter refuses to believe it. Meanwhile, Mazie's boyfriend has come to visit. Mrs. Craig finds him, Mazie, and Mrs. Harold talking in the kitchen, and fires Mazie for letting him in.

Walter soon steps out and learns that Fergus Passmore and his wife have died. Mr. Catelle, a police detective, comes to the house and to find out who called information about the Passmores' phone number. Harriet replies she does not know who had made the call, and Catelle leaves. Walter returns and Harriet tells him the police had come to the house. He wants to call the police station, but Harriet forbids him from telephoning because she suspects their phone is now being watched. Walter deduces that Harriet had made the call, and questions why she is spying on him. The two fall into an argument.

The next morning, Ethel's fiancé Gene Fredericks arrives and they leave together. Mrs. Harold has decided to join Ellen Austen on her travels. She tells Mrs. Craig that she is quitting without notice and leaves the house. Walter learns he has been cleared of suspicion as police detectives have verified that Fergus and his wife died in a murder–suicide. Fed up with Harriet's ways, Walter leaves her the keys to the house and garage and promises not to return, stating Harriet had married a house and not him.

Harriet soon receives a telegram informing that her sister has died that morning. Having alienated everyone, Harriet finds herself alone in a pristine house. The film ends with a line that Miss Austen said to Harriet: "People who live to themselves — are generally left to themselves."

== Cast ==
- Rosalind Russell as Harriet Craig
- John Boles as Walter Craig
- Billie Burke as Mrs. Frazier
- Jane Darwell as Mrs. Harold
- Dorothy Wilson as Ethel Landreth
- Alma Kruger as Ellen Austen
- Thomas Mitchell as Fergus Passmore
- Raymond Walburn as Billy Birkmire
- Elisabeth Risdon as Mrs. Landreth
- Robert Allen as Gene Fredericks
- Nydia Westman as Mazie
- Kathleen Burke as Adelaide Passmore
- George Offerman Jr. as Tom
- Wallis Clark as Mr. Burton (uncredited)

== Reception ==
Frank S. Nugent of the The New York Times, wrote that the play’s original theme was well translated to create "a thoroughly engrossing photoplay which has a point to make, keeps it constantly in view and drives it home viciously at the end." He credited Rosalind Russell’s performance for the overall impact of the film, with the comment, "The entire weight of the drama depends upon the malign effectiveness of its central character and Miss Russell, here enjoying her first real opportunity in Hollywood, gives a viciously eloquent performance."

Variety also offered praise for Rosalind Russell and wrote, "In hands less capable than Miss Russell's and others in the cast, Craig's Wife might have been a big bore … As it is, it is entertainment largely through the skill of the cast and the careful presentation of the characteristics of a selfish wife. Miss Russell deserves stardom after her work in this one."

Lionel Collier, for the British magazine, Picturegoer, offered a less positive review and described the film as "rather a tedious psychological study." He commented that Arzner "has overstated her case and been guilty of slowing down the tempo unduly", but added, "there is a lot of human feeling and observation in the production, and it presents a very distinct appeal to women." Discussing Rosalind Russell’s performance, Collier wrote that she "does occasionally become rather artificial."

Louella Parsons wrote, "How well I remember Craig's Wife, a typical woman's play, and it's smart business therefore not only to sign Rosalind, but to hand the direction over to Dorothy Arzner, the only woman director in the business." According to the Harrisonburg Daily News Record, "The supporting cast of Craig's Wife is one of the strongest ever to be assembled in one picture." The Port Neches Chronicle thought that "This dynamic drama, baring the life of all womankind, is a screen triumph no wife or sweetheart dare miss! ... The play that electrified Broadway and won the Pulitzer prize, now lays bare the heart of a woman and her consuming passion!" The Oakland Tribune felt "Craig's Wife is likely to appeal chiefly to women audiences and to attract attention mainly from those who demand that their movies be intelligent. It deserves better treatment than that for it is well made and excellently played."
