= Virginia Bradford =

American actress

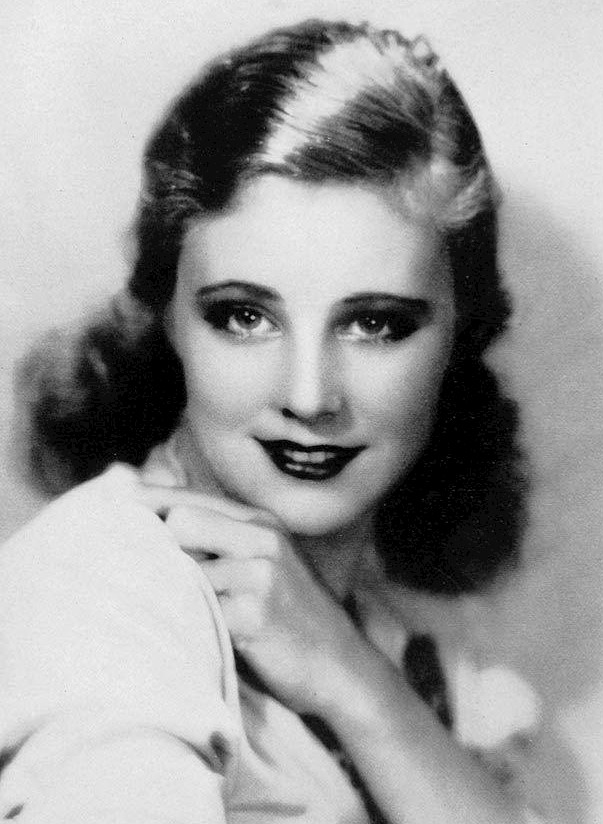
- Virginia Bradford in 1930.
- Born: November 7, 1899; Memphis, Tennessee
- Died: October 30, 1995 (aged 95); Indiana
- Occupation: Actress
- Years active: 1923–1934
- Spouse: Cedric Belfrage (m. 1928)

Virginia Bradford (born Ada Virginia Estes; November 7, 1899 – October 30, 1995) was an American actress.

== Biography ==
Bradford born Ada Virginia Estes in Memphis, Tennessee. She was a former reporter who worked as an actress in the late 1920s. Her films include The Country Doctor (1927) and Stage Madness (1927).

== Filmography ==
Year	Title	Role	Notes
1923	The Ten Commandments		Uncredited
1926	A Six Shootin' Romance	Muriel Travis	Lost film
1926	The Boy Friend		Uncredited. Lost film
1926	Atta Boy	The Girl, Jane Allen	
1927	Stage Madness	Dora Anderson	Lost film
1927	The Country Doctor	Opal Jones	
1927	The Wreck of the Hesperus	Gale Slocum	
1927	Chicago	Katie	
1927	Car Shy	Eleanor Wright	
1928	Two Lovers	Grete	Incomplete film
1928	Craig's Wife	Ethel	Lost film
1928	Marked Money	Grace Fairchild	
1929	The One Man Dog	Babette	Lost film
1934	The Private Life of Don Juan		

== Personal life ==
Bradford married several times. In 1928, Bradford married Cedric Belfrage, but divorced two years later. Bradford's other husbands include Frederick Minter, Joseph Petrie Lyons, and Thomas Prentice.

On October 30, 1995 Bradford died in Indiana.
