= Hal Skelly =

American broadway and film actor (1891–1934)

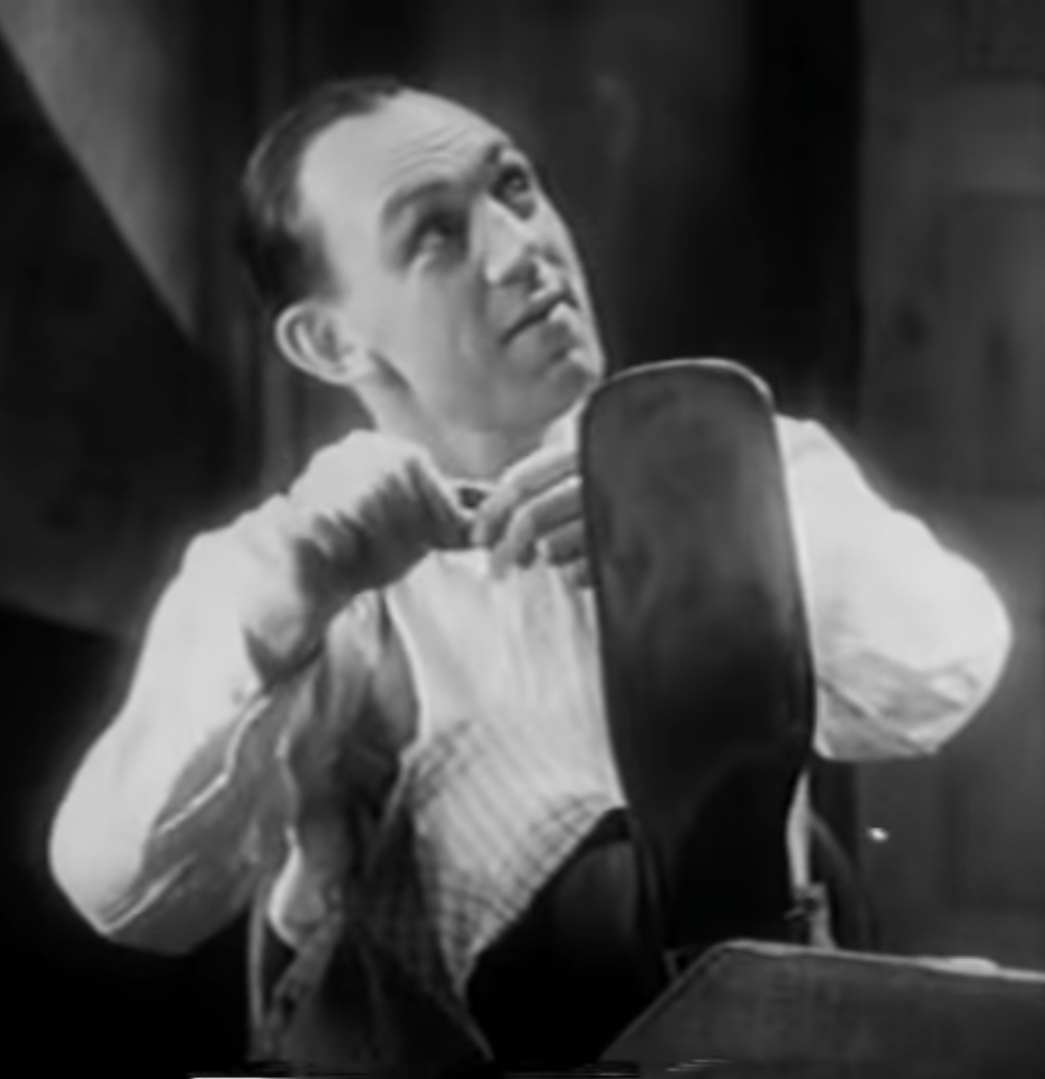
- Skelly in The Dance of Life (1929)
- Born: James Harold Skelley; May 31, 1891; Alleghenyville, Pennsylvania, U.S.
- Died: June 16, 1934 (aged 43); West Cornwall, Connecticut, U.S.
- Resting place: Mount Calvary Cemetery; Davenport, Iowa; 41.56337°N 90.56403°W
- Occupation: Actor
- Years active: 1918–1934
- Spouse: Eunice Sauvin

Hal Skelly (James Harold Skelley; May 31, 1891 – June 16, 1934) was an American Broadway and film actor.

== Early years ==
He was born James Harold Skelley in Alleghenyville, Pennsylvania to James and Martha Skelley. His family moved to Davenport, Iowa when he was four. He had four sisters and three brothers. Skelley was educated at Sacred Heart School in Davenport and St. Bede Academy in Peru, Illinois.

== Career ==
Skelly left home at the age of 15 and joined the circus. He acted in his first stage production, The Time, the Place and the Girl, at the LaSalle Theater in Chicago when he was 16. For a short period of time he was a backup first baseman for the Boston Braves and a prizefight manager. For his professional name he shortened his middle name Harold to Hal and dropped the final "e" in Skelley.

Skelly became a veteran of medicine shows, musical comedy, burlesque, Lew Dockstader's minstrels and opera. He joined the A.M. Zinn musical comedy company in San Francisco where his eccentric dancing ability earned him the nickname "Tumbling Harold Skelly". Always enamored with the circus, he spent a year with Barnum & Bailey. Skelly toured China and Japan with a musical comedy troupe, the Raymond Teale Company.

Skelly made his Broadway debut in Fiddler’s Three (1918) and went on to appear in ten other shows on Broadway. In 1927, he played a starring role alongside Barbara Stanwyck, in her first Broadway hit, the production Burlesque. Paramount Pictures invited the two to star in the 1929 talkie film version of the show, retitled The Dance of Life because studio executives judged the original title too risqué. Stanwyck turned down the offer, while Skelly accepted, reprising his role as "Skid Johnson". He would make a total of ten films, including the Woman Trap (1929), Behind the Make-Up (1930), and The Shadow Laughs (1933), and was also featured on two movie soundtracks.

== Death ==
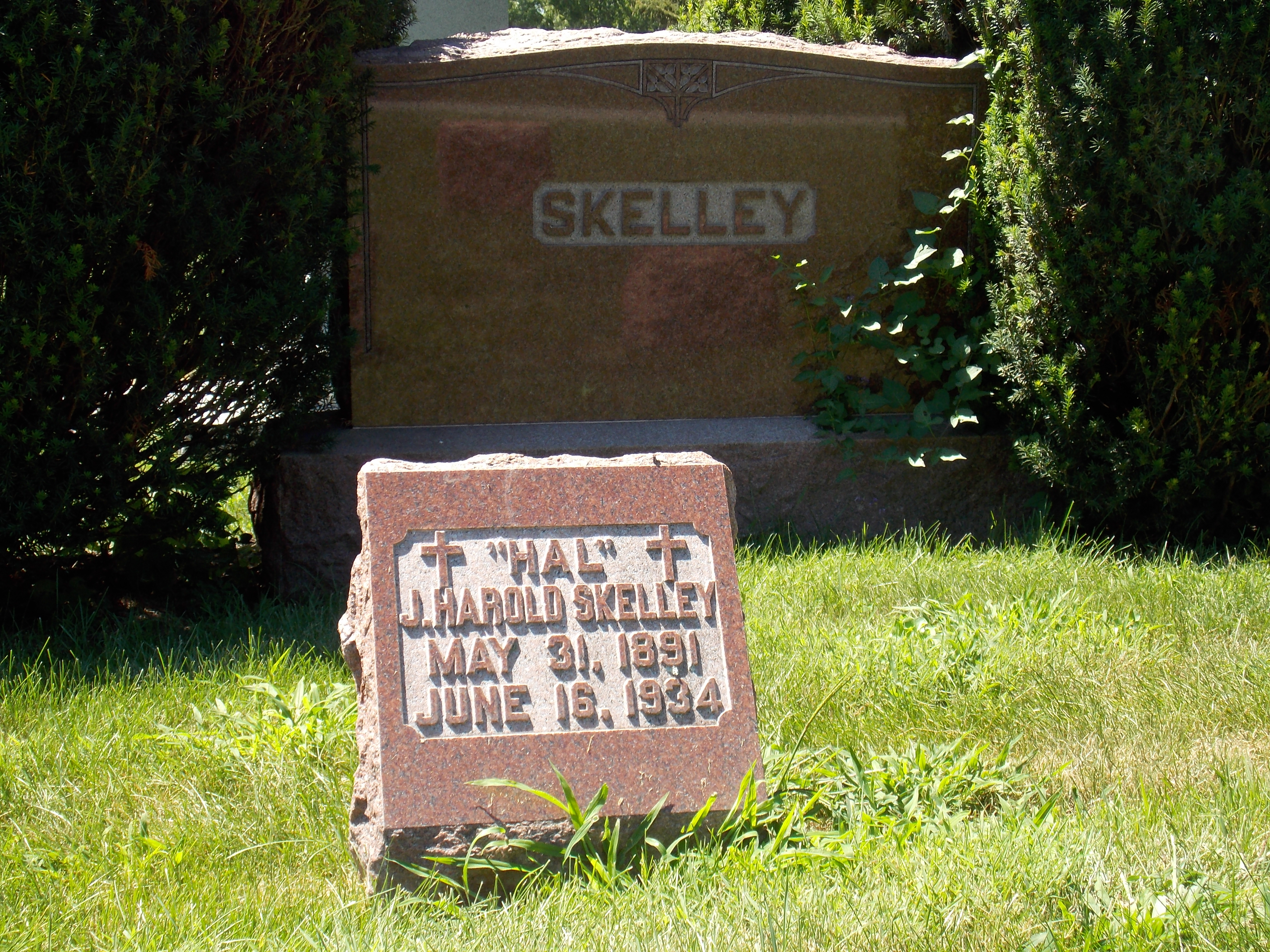
Hal Skelly's grave marker used the original spelling of the family's name.

Skelly was killed in a train-auto accident in West Cornwall, Connecticut when the truck he was driving was struck by the New York to Pittsfield train of the New Haven Railroad at a crossing.

News reports at the time said he was staying with friends and he was looking for a dog that had run away. His widow, Eunice, brought his body back to New York City for the funeral, which was held in the Actor's Chapel at Saint Malachy's Catholic Church in Manhattan. His mother and his brother Hugh accompanied the body back to Davenport for burial at St. Marguerite's Cemetery, now known as Mount Calvary Cemetery.

== Broadway ==
Hal Skelly acted in the following shows on Broadway:

- Fiddlers Three (1918), as Sam Wigglesbury
- The Night Boat (1920), as Freddie Ides
- The Girl in the Spotlight (1920), as Watchem Tripp
- Orange Blossoms (1922), as Jimmy Flynn
- Mary Jane McKane (1923–1924), as Joe McGillicudy
- Betty Lee (1924–1925), as Wallingford Speed
- Burlesque (1927–1928), as Skid Johnson
- Melody (1933), as François Trapadoux
- Ghost Writer (1933), as Bill Harkins
- Queer People (1934), as Theodore Anthony White
- Come What May (1934), as Chet Harrison

== Filmography ==
Hal Skelly acted in the following films:

- The Dancing Town (1928; short)
- The Dance of Life (1929) as 'Skid'
- Woman Trap (1929) as Dan Malone
- Behind the Make-Up (1930) as Hap Brown
- Men Are Like That (1930) as J. Aubrey Piper (*copy held at Library of Congress)
- The Gob (1930; short)
- The Struggle (1931) as Jimmie Wilson
- Hotel Variety (1933)
- The Shadow Laughs (1933) as Robin Dale
- The Chump (1934; short)

== Discography ==
Hal Shelly is featured on the following recordings:

- The Dance of Life (1929) featured: "True Blue Lou" / "The Flippity Flop"
- Men Are Like That (1930) featured: "In the Gloaming" 1877
