= George Kelly (playwright) =

American playwright, screenwriter, director, and actor

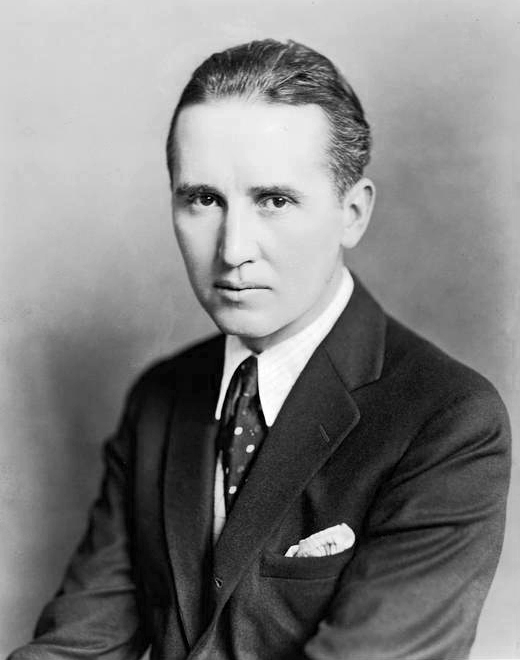
- Born: January 16, 1887; Philadelphia, Pennsylvania, U.S.
- Died: June 18, 1974 (aged 87); Bryn Mawr, Pennsylvania, U.S.
- Partner: William Weagley

George Edward Kelly (January 16, 1887 – June 18, 1974) was an American playwright, screenwriter, director, and actor. He began his career in vaudeville as an actor and sketch writer. He became best known for his satiric comedies, including The Torch-Bearers (1922) and The Show-Off (1924). He won the Pulitzer Prize for Craig's Wife (1925).

== Early life ==
Kelly was born in Philadelphia on January 16, 1887. He was the second youngest of ten children born to Mary Ann (née Costello) and John Henry Kelly, an Irish immigrant. He was the brother of American businessman and Olympic champion sculler John B. Kelly Sr. and the uncle of actress Grace Kelly, who became Princess consort of Monaco, and Olympic rower John B. Kelly Jr.

Not much is known about his early life, but he was an actor in his early years. He made his professional stage debut in 1911, and spent the next several years touring in popular stage plays; among them Owen Wister's The Virginian. He did not like the dramatic material available during the turn of the century, and wanted to change that. He served in France during World War I and after he came home started writing.

== Career ==
Throughout his career, Kelly remained a realistic playwright, unaffected by the experiments of theatrical modernism. Novelist Edward Maisel described him as "a simple moralist using the theatre for simple moral purposes." Kelly's plays are often dominated by characters of monstrous egotism, and he casts a harsh light on their shortcomings. Uncompromising in his vision, he scrupulously avoided sentimentality and depictions of romance. Arthur Willis noted "Kelly appears to be anti-love, anti-romantic love, certainly, and distrustful of the tender emotions."

In his first full-length play, The Torch-Bearers, Kelly satirizes the "Little Theatre Movement", depicting it as made up of narcissistic and undisciplined amateurs. Their leader, Mrs. J. Duro Pampinelli, is a brilliant caricature of self-indulgent dilettantism. In the first act, Kelly shows the troupe incapable of conducting a competent rehearsal; in the second, he depicts with farcical brilliance their public performance collapsing in shambles. In the third act, however, the tone grows more earnest as the players are excoriated for their indulgences. In his greatest popular and commercial success, The Show-Off, Kelly focuses his critique on the figure of Aubrey Piper, a loud, lying, self-deluded businessman with an obnoxious laugh and an obvious toupee. With Craig's Wife (1925), Kelly's satire grew more severe; Harriet Craig destroys her marriage through her possessiveness and materialism.

In his later plays, Kelly grew even more severe and judgmental, and his audiences grew smaller. Behold the Bridegroom (1927) shows a shallow and decadent flapper pine away when she meets a morally upright man who makes her realize her lack of character. Despite a much-praised performance by Judith Anderson in the leading role, the play ran for only 88 performances. Philip Goes Forth (1931) is the story of a young man who is much enamored of his image of himself as a young playwright. He rebels against his family and moves into a boarding house for artists, only to discover that he has no talent. It enjoyed a run of only 97 performances. Two late plays, Maggie the Magnificent (1929) and The Deep Mrs. Sykes (1929), were very poorly received and were never even published. As a result of the box-office failure of his later works, Kelly moved to Hollywood, and only rarely returned to the theatre. The Fatal Weakness (1946) was his last Broadway play. At the time of his death, four of his plays remained unperformed and have yet to premiere.

== Personal life ==
George Kelly, a "life-long bachelor," maintained a 55-year relationship with his partner William Eldon Weagley (November 27, 1896 – October 16, 1975), the son of John Adams Weagley and Ella Frances Weagley, up until his death. Weagley was often referred to as his valet. That Kelly was gay was a closely guarded secret and went unacknowledged by his family to the point of not inviting Weagley to his funeral; he instead slipped in and sat quietly on a back seat.

Kelly died on June 18, 1974, at the Bryn Mawr Hospital in Bryn Mawr, Pennsylvania, after several years of living in Sun City, a desert retirement village in Riverside, California.

== Stage productions ==
- The Torch-Bearers (1922), the basis for the 1935 motion picture Doubting Thomas and the 1939 movie Too Busy to Work
- The Show-Off (1924), the basis for the 1926, 1934, and 1946 motion pictures of the same name and the 1930 movie Men Are Like That
- Craig's Wife (1925), for which he won the Pulitzer Prize; the basis for the 1928 and 1936 motion pictures of the same name and the 1950 movie Harriet Craig
- Daisy Mayme (1926)
- Behold, the Bridegroom (1927)
- The Flattering Word (1929)
- Maggie the Magnificent (1929)
- Philip Goes Forth (1931)
- Reflected Glory (1936)
- The Deep Mrs. Sykes (1945)
- The Fatal Weakness (1947)
