= Old Globe Theatre =

Theater in San Diego, California

The Old Globe
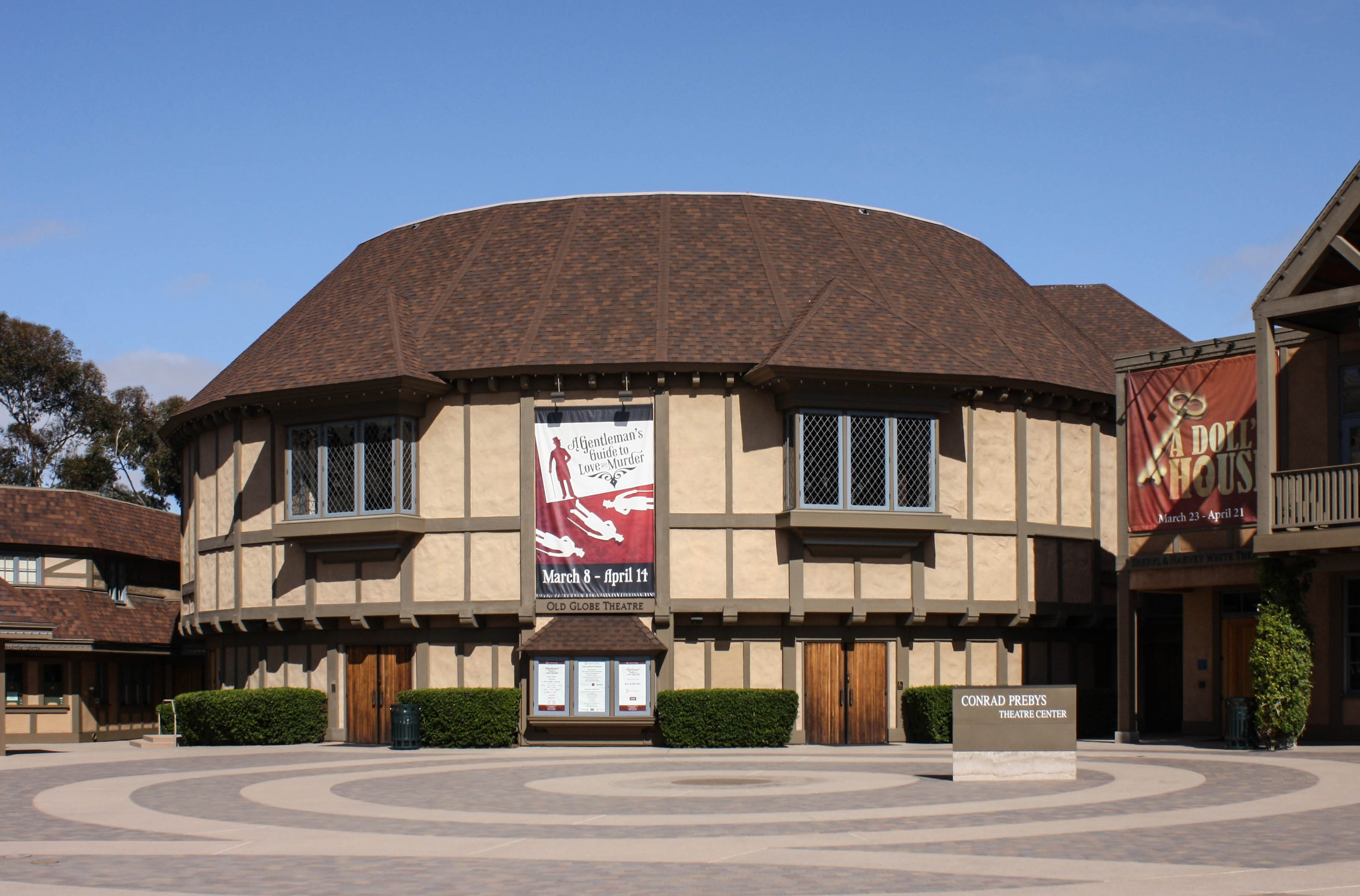
- Interactive map of The Old Globe
- Address: 1363 Old Globe Way
- Location: San Diego, California, U.S.
- Coordinates: 32°43′56.1″N 117°9′8″W
- Capacity: Old Globe Theatre: 580; Sheryl and Harvey White Theatre: 250; Lowell Davies Festival Theatre: 620
- Type: Regional theater

Construction
- Opened: 1935
- Renovated: 1982–1993
- Architects: Thomas Wood Stevens (original); Liebhardt, Botton & Associates, A.I.A. (rebuilt)

Website
- www.theoldglobe.org

The Old Globe is a professional theatre company in Balboa Park in San Diego, California. It produces about 15 plays and musicals annually in summer and winter seasons. Plays are performed in three separate theatres in the complex, which is collectively called the Simon Edison Centre for the Performing Arts:

- Old Globe Theatre – 600-seat flagship theatre, fully enclosed, featuring the Donald and Darlene Shiley Stage
- Sheryl and Harvey White Theatre – 250-seat intimate theatre in the round (completed 2009)
- Lowell Davies Festival Theatre – 605-seat outdoor theatre

The Old Globe Theatre and the Sheryl and Harvey White Theatre are part of the Conrad Prebys Theatre Center. The White Theatre is located within the Karen and Donald Cohn Education Center.

== History ==
=== 1930s–1950s ===
The Old Globe Theatre was built in 1935, designed by Richard Requa as part of the California Pacific International Exposition. The theatre was based on a copy of one built for the Chicago Century of Progress, which in turn was a copy of the Globe Theatre in London, England, where many of William Shakespeare's plays were performed during his lifetime. Like the original Globe, the theatre was open in the center with a roof over the seating on the sides.

During the exposition, it hosted 50-minute versions of Shakespeare plays. At the end of the exposition, the Globe had been received so well that a nonprofit organization called the San Diego Community Theatre was formed to save the temporary structure from demolition. The committee leased the structure from the city, produced full-length plays, and created a more permanent structure by roofing over the theatre and bringing it up to code. The Globe Players, founded by Thomas Wood Stevens, began by producing abridged adaptations of Shakespeare plays in The Globe to attract tourists in the San Diego area, with most of the plays lasting less than an hour.

The first director of the Globe theater was Luther Kennett (1937), and on December 2, 1937, the remodeled Old Globe Theatre opened with a production of John Van Druten's 1933 play The Distaff Side. In the cast was a young actor named Craig Noel, whose presence as an actor, director, and artistic leader would guide the theatre's growth through more than five decades of continuous production. Noel would become the second director of the Globe and play a major role in its development. Under his direction, the Globe would win a Tony award and become the first professional Actors Equity theater on the West Coast. He is also responsible for the founding of the San Diego National Shakespeare Festival during his time at the Globe.

In 1939, Noel was hired as general director. During World War II, the United States Navy took over all buildings in Balboa Park, including the Globe. The Community Theatre group stayed together, producing one-act plays in various venues around San Diego. When the Globe was returned to civilian use in 1947, Noel returned as general director, and he remained in a leadership position until his death in 2010. In 1949, he launched the Globe's summer Shakespeare Festival in partnership with the drama department at University of San Diego. Since then the Shakespeare festival has been presented every summer except 1953, when Noel broke with tradition by producing the smash hit play Mister Roberts instead. The Globe continued to produce a combination of modern plays along with Shakespeare and other classics.

Since 1949, the National Shakespeare Festival has taken place nearly every summer at the Globe in San Diego.

In 1951, the San Diego Junior Theater Wing of the Old Globe began to offer adventurous, youthful plays for children. Many of the students in the Junior Wing would become actors in the company. For example, Victor Buono, who went on to become a film star after his time at the Globe. In 1953, the Junior Theater became a part of the San Diego Park and Recreation Department, having outgrown the Globe.

From 1955 to 1978, Peggy Kellner designed over 200 shows at the Old Globe, including costuming and set design.

=== 1960s–1990s ===
The Cassius Carter Centre Stage, a theater in the round, was added in 1969 in what had been the Falstaff Tavern restaurant. It was rebuilt in 2009 as the Sheryl and Harvey White Theatre.

In March 1978, the Globe Theatre was destroyed in an arson fire, and an outdoor festival stage was hastily constructed so that the 1978 season could still be produced. An outdoor stage was built just for the National Shakespeare Festival to continue. They performed modern spins on Shakespeare, including a 1987 production of A Midsummer Night's Dream that featured an original jazz score. The Globe Theatre was rebuilt and reopened in 1981. In 1984, the festival stage was damaged in an arson attack. It was rebuilt and is now named the Lowell Davies Festival Theatre. The entire three-theatre complex is called the Simon Edison Centre for the Performing Arts.

In 1981 Jack O'Brien was hired as artistic director, while Noel became executive producer.

In 1982, Teatro Meta, a bilingual theatre company co-sponsored by the Old Globe, University of California San Diego, and Southwestern College, had its first production. It was founded by Noel and Jorge Huerta. It became independent in 1987.

=== 1990s–present ===
In 2012, Barry Edelstein was named artistic director. The Globe has grown into an internationally known theatre complex, an "influential powerhouse among regional theatres." In 1984, it received the Tony Award for best regional theatre.

== Notable productions ==
Shows which originated at the Old Globe have gone on to Broadway to win nine Tony Awards and nearly 60 nominations.

Year	Show	Opened on Broadway	Notes
1986	Into the Woods	1987	Won Best Actress, Best Score, and Best Book of a Musical at 1988 Tony Awards
1988	Joe Turner's Come and Gone	1988	Won Best Featured Actress in a Play at 1988 Tony Awards
1988	Rumors	1989	Won Best Featured Actress in a Play at 1989 Tony Awards
1989	The Piano Lesson	1990	
1990	Jake's Women	1992	
1991	Two Trains Running	1992	Won Best Featured Actor in a Play at 1992 Tony Awards
1993	Redwood Curtain	1993	Won Best Featured Actress in a Play at 1993 Tony Awards
1993	Damn Yankees	1994	Won Best Featured Actor in a Musical at 1994 Tony Awards
1995	Getting Away With Murder (Globe title: "The Doctor is Out")	1996	
1996	Play On!	1997	
1998	Getting and Spending	1998	
1998–present	Dr. Seuss's How the Grinch Stole Christmas!	2006	
2000	The Full Monty	2000	
2002	Imaginary Friends	2002	
2003	Julius Caesar	2005	
2003	Oldest Living Confederate Widow Tells All	2004	
2004	Dirty Rotten Scoundrels	2005	Won Best Leading Actor in a Musical at 2005 Tony Awards
2005	Chita Rivera: The Dancer's Life	2005	
2006	The Times They Are A-Changin'	2006	
2007	A Catered Affair	2008	
2012	Allegiance	2015	
2013	A Gentleman's Guide to Love and Murder	2013	Won Best Musical, Best Book, Best Costume Design of a Musical, and Best Direction of a Musical at 2014 Tony Awards
2014	Bright Star	2016	
2016	Meteor Shower	2017	
2019	Almost Famous	2022	
2022	Bob Fosse's Dancin'	2023	
2024	English	2025	
