= Old Acquaintance (play) =

1940 play

- Original language: English
- Written by: John Van Druten
- Subject: Long friendship between two women is tested
- Genre: Comedy
- Setting: Katherine's apartment in Washington Square; Park Avenue drawing-room; November–December 1940

Premiere
- Date: December 23, 1940
- Place: Morosco Theatre
- Directed by: Auriol Lee

Old Acquaintance is a 1940 play by the British writer John Van Druten. It is a three-act drama, with a small cast and two settings. The story is a conflict between two women, childhood friends from Harrisburg, Pennsylvania and now both successful writers. It is all conversation, with exits and entrances the only action. It was considered a "woman's play" by contemporary reviewers.

Old Acquaintance was first produced on Broadway by Dwight Deere Wiman, staged by Auriol Lee, with set design by Richard Whorf, and starred Peggy Wood and Jane Cowl. It ran from December 1940 thru May 1941 on Broadway. The film version was released in early November 1943. It had a Broadway revival during 2007.

== Characters ==
Listed in order of appearance within their scope.
Leads

- Katherine Markham called Kit, is 42, an elite writer, veteran of love affairs, stylish, warm, and perfect.
- Rudd Kendall is 31, an assistant at Mallory Press, Kit's publisher, and is also her current lover.
- Mildred Watson Drake called Milly, is 42, pretty, divorced, wealthy writer of trash, and decidedly imperfect.
- Deirdre Drake is 19, the daughter of Milly and Preston, who admires Kit and wants to emulate her.

Supporting

- Preston Drake is Milly's ex-husband, a handsome and understanding man in his late forties.

Featured

- Sabrina is Kit's live-out Black housekeeper, who smokes and listens to radio soap operas.
- Susan is an elderly woman, one of Milly's many live-in servants.

Voice Only

- Don Estry is a WOTC (Note: At the time these call letters were unassigned to any actual radio station.) radio announcer who introduces Chuck Adler and his Hillbilly Highlights.
- Granny is the main character of a radio soap opera called Little Granny.
- Johnny is a young man, Granny's grandson on Little Granny.

Off-stage

- Lucian Grant is a polished young chaser with a past who keeps Deirdre out all night.
- Caroline Lindsay is a wealthy friend of Milly and Kit who rents her Park Avenue apartment to the former.
- Jane Meredith is 27, a book illustrator, a discovery of Milly, whom Preston Drake has been seeing.
- Stephanie Morrison is a gossipy married friend of Kit's who phones during Act III.
- M. Skeffington Liebowitz is a Hollywood studio executive trying to recruit Rudd Kendall.

== Synopsis ==
Act I (A November morning at 8am in Kit's living room) Kit and Rudd have been out all night at a publisher's party. Kit worries about Deirdre being out all night with Lucian Grant. Rudd asks why, since Deirdre is doing the same Kit did at her age. Kit confesses her worries are for Deirdre's mother. Rudd proposes to Kit, who turns him down. They break off when Deirdre arrives. Kit and Deirdre spar about staying out all night, and Kit warns her Milly is coming over. When Kit goes upstairs to dress, Deirdre tells Rudd she wants to stay with Kit all winter. Rudd scolds her presumption, but is moved to see her concern for Kit's opinion. Kit comes down and Rudd leaves. Deirdre asks Kit about staying over for the winter, but Kit demurs, knowing that Milly would not approve.

Milly arrives; since Deirdre wants to stay in Manhattan for the winter, she has rented an apartment on Park Avenue. Of course, Milly and all the servants will stay there as well. Milly tries to get Deirdre to come home with her to Pelham, but Deirdre has a date for that evening. She leaves to go to sleep, while Kit and Milly have an uneasy discussion about the girl and their friendship. Milly knows about Rudd and Kit's other lovers. Milly presses her about Jane Meredith seeing Preston Drake. Kit admits they met at her place and are engaged. Milly speaks disparagingly of Jane's morals, which Kit counters. Rudd returns to pick up Kit; Milly departs. Rudd wonders how the two of them can be friends. Kit insists they are best friends. (Curtain)

Act II (One month later at Park Avenue, about 5:30pm) Kit comes to Milly's apartment to drop off her unrevised proof. Deirdre asks her opinion about having an affair with Lucian. Kit discourages her. Deirdre leaves when Milly comes in, who's surprised to see Kit; she has a visitor coming. Kit takes the hint and bows out, but tells Milly about Rudd's proposal. Preston Drake arrives, an awkward meeting between ex-spouses. Milly tells him Deirdre is getting involved with Lucian Grant. She clumsily links Lucian with Jane Meredith, at which Preston stops her. He knows Kit told Milly about his engagement to Jane. He now tells Milly how while they were married he made a play for Kit but she shut him down. He leaves Milly in shock. When Rudd appears, Milly abandons him to Deirdre. In astonishing short time he is kissing her and they are confirming their mutual attraction. Milly returns as Rudd leaves; she chooses now to tell Deirdre about Rudd and Kit. Deirdre rushes out in tears. When Kit returns to have dinner with Milly, she encounters an enraged friend who accuses her of wrecking her marriage and trying to steal her daughter. Kit scolds Milly for hurting Deirdre. She denies ever having an affair with Preston but Milly calls her a liar and orders her out. (Curtain)

Act III (The next day about 3:30pm, in Kit's living room) Sabrina has just finished listening to a radio broadcast when Kit returns from shopping. Rudd arrives and announces he's going to California for five days. He's taken a job with Skeff Leibowitz; his first assignment is Milly's new novel which the studio wants for a film. Kit wants to tell him she's reconsidering his proposal, but Rudd forestalls her by confessing he's in love with Deirdre. Deirdre arrives, trying to act nonchalant, but Kit leaves her alone with Rudd for explanations. Kit comes back, Rudd leaves, and Deirdre lets herself be talked round into reconsidering him. Milly arrives; Deirdre has ducked out the back door. Milly returns Kit's new book, advising her to cut two chapters. Surprised, Kit realises she is right. Milly reveals she is returning to Pelham. She's arranged for Deirdre to have a room at a women's club. Expecting to concede Deirdre to Kit, Milly is stymied upon hearing the new state of affairs. Sabrina brings tea; the two women tenatively reach out to each other. Milly chokes out an apology, and Kit steers her into talking about old times. (Curtain)

== Original production ==
=== Background ===
The playwright John Van Druten, producer Dwight Deere Wiman, and director Auriol Lee had collaborated before, (Note: This was to be their final joint effort, for Lee would die in an auto accident during July 1941.) on works such as After All, Most of the Game, and Leave Her to Heaven. This was Van Druten's first play with American characters only, in a New York setting. He told reporter Marjory Adams that "if you write a play about Europe today it has to be about the war."

=== Cast ===
Cast for the tryouts in New Haven and Boston and during the original Broadway run.
Role	Actor	Dates	Notes and sources
Katherine Markham	Jane Cowl	Dec 06, 1940 – May 17, 1941	
Mildred Watson Drake	Peggy Wood	Dec 06, 1940 – May 17, 1941	
Rudd Kendall	Kent Smith	Dec 06, 1940 – May 17, 1941	
Deirdre Drake	Adele Longmire	Dec 06, 1940 – May 17, 1941	Her understudy was Nancy Wiman, the producer's daughter.
Preston Drake	Barry Jones	Dec 06, 1940 – Dec 16, 1940	The reason for Jones leaving midway through the second tryout is unknown.
Preston Drake	Hunter Gardner	Dec 17, 1940 – May 17, 1941	
Sabrina	Anna Franklin	Dec 06, 1940 – May 17, 1941	
Susan	Edna West	Dec 06, 1940 – May 17, 1941	

=== Tryouts ===
The play's first performance was on December 6, 1940, at Shubert Theatre in New Haven, Connecticut. Reviewer M. Oakley Christoph called it "a sure-fire Broadway hit" and said "it has little if any need for play-doctoring". Another reviewer agreed it was a hit, attributing its success to the writing, direction, and the performances of the three female leads.

After three performances in New Haven, the production went to the Plymouth Theatre in Boston, where it opened on December 9, 1940. There the reviewer (Note: The review carries no byline but was almost certainly done by Marjory Adams.) said "How appallingly well Mr. van Druten knows female psychology and with what deadly accuracy he can tell about it!" However, the reviewer also noted the play was "civilised and warm-hearted, and its people are the sparkling sort you alway hope to meet."

=== Premiere and reception ===
Old Acquaintance had its Broadway premiere on December 23, 1940, at the Morosco Theatre. Jane Cowl had top billing in advertising, while Peggy Wood's name was just as large under the title. Arthur Pollock of the Brooklyn Daily Eagle said: "Nothing very much happens. The relations of these three women are constantly under analysis, with amusing results." He thought the play had "too many words for its own good" but was "sensitive and sophisticated entertainment". Burns Mantle of the New York Daily News said "There isn't a great deal to Mr. Van Druten's comedy aside from its leading characters." He also felt the play depended entirely upon its prospective female audiences, "For this is a women's play if ever there was one." Brooks Atkinson of The New York Times provided a summation of Old Acquaintance of which only the first sentence found its way into later advertising for the play:

"In the quality of the writing and acting 'Old Acquaintance' represents the best work in our theatre. It is regretfully admitted at this point that the story Mr. van Druten is telling is frail and unsubstantial and scarcely worth the trouble every one has taken with it."

The Catholic newspaper The Tablet gave Old Acquaintance its "Class C – Wholly Objectionable" rating.

The entire company of Old Acquaintance took the train to Washington, D.C., on January 26, 1941, where they gave a command performance at the National Theatre for President Roosevelt and other dignitaries. Roosevelt was amused by the play, while the audience demanded curtain calls by the cast.

=== Change of venue and closing ===
The production moved from the Morosco Theatre to the Broadhurst Theatre on April 8, 1941. The producer continued the policy of foregoing Monday evening performances in favor of an extra matinee on Thursdays.

Old Acquaintance was supposed to close in early May, but there was enough business to keep going for two more weeks. The play had been performed 162 times by May 11, 1941. It closed a week later on May 17, 1941, at the Broadhurst Theatre. There was no immediate tour; instead, a limited tour was to be launched in the fall of 1941.

== London company ==
In Britain it had a tryout at the Theatre Royal, Bath before moving to the Apollo Theatre in the West End where it ran 218 times from December 18, 1941, to June 6, 1942. The cast included Edith Evans, Muriel Pavlow and Ronald Ward.

== Revival ==
The play had a revival on Broadway starting with some previews on June 1, 2007, at the American Airlines Theatre. The Roundabout Theatre Company's regular performances ran from June 28 through August 19, 2007. The production starred Harriet Harris as Milly and Margaret Colin as Kit, with Diane Davis as Deirdre, Corey Stoll as Rudd, and Stephen Bogardus as Preston Drake.

== Adaptations ==
=== Radio ===
While the play was still running on Broadway, Jane Cowl and Peggy Wood performed a thirty minute excerpt from it over the NBC Blue Network on Sunday, January 19, 1941.

=== Film ===
Warner Brothers purchased the film rights to Old Acquaintance during January 1941 for $75,000. In 1943, the play was adapted by Lenore Coffee and John van Druten into a screenplay. The resulting film was directed by Vincent Sherman and starred Bette Davis and Miriam Hopkins, with John Loder, Gig Young, and Delores Moran.

== Bibliography ==
- Bordman, Gerald. American Theatre: A Chronicle of Comedy and Drama, 1930-1969. Oxford University Press, 1996.
- Goble, Alan. The Complete Index to Literary Sources in Film. Walter de Gruyter, 1999.
- Wearing, J.P. The London Stage 1940-1949: A Calendar of Productions, Performers, and Personnel. Rowman & Littlefield, 2014.
