= Foxes (film) =

1980 film by Adrian Lyne

- Theatrical release poster
- Directed by: Adrian Lyne
- Written by: Gerald Ayres
- Produced by: David Puttnam; Gerald Ayres
- Starring: Jodie Foster; Scott Baio; Sally Kellerman; Randy Quaid
- Cinematography: Leon Bijou; Michael Seresin
- Edited by: Jim Coblentz
- Music by: Giorgio Moroder
- Production companies: PolyGram Pictures; Casablanca Records & Filmworks
- Distributed by: United Artists
- Release date: February 29, 1980
- Running time: 106 minutes
- Country: United States
- Language: English
- Box office: $7.5 million

Foxes is a 1980 American coming-of-age drama film directed by Adrian Lyne, in his feature film directorial debut, and written by Gerald Ayres. The film stars Jodie Foster, Scott Baio, Sally Kellerman, Randy Quaid and Cherie Currie in her acting debut. It revolves around a group of teenage girls coming of age in suburban Los Angeles toward the end of the disco era.

Foxes was released theatrically in the United States on February 29, 1980 by United Artists. The film was Foster's penultimate major film appearance before taking a sabbatical from acting to attend Yale University. It received several positive reviews from critics. The film grossed $7.5 million in North America and earned a cult following.

== Plot ==
A group of four teenage girls in the San Fernando Valley during the end of the 1970s have painful emotional troubles. Deirdre Tompkins is a disco queen who is fascinated by her sexuality, likes boys and has many relationship problems. Madge Axman is unhappily overweight and angry that she is still a virgin; her parents are overprotective and she has an annoying younger sister, Sissie. Annie Mallick is a teenage runaway who drinks, uses drugs and runs away from her abusive police officer father Frank. Jeanie feels she has to take care of them all, but has her own problems fighting with her divorced mother Mary who cycles through multiple boyfriends, and is yearning for a closer relationship with her distant father Bryan, a tour manager for the rock band Angel.

The girls believe school is a waste of time, their boyfriends are immature, and the adults in their respective lives don't seem to care. All four become immersed in the decadence of the late 1970s; they convince themselves that the only way to loosen up and forget the bad things is to party and have fun. Annie proves to be the most reckless of the four, while Jeanie is ready to grow up and wants to stop acting like a child. Jeanie is most worried about Annie continually takes risks to try to keep Annie clean and safe, but her unstable behavior keeps everyone on edge, and after hitching a ride with a couple she ends up critically injured when they crash into the back of a tractor trailer, and Annie later dies in the ER as Jeanie and the others, including Annie's father, watch in horror.

After Annie's death, the three remaining friends all start to mature: Madge marries Jay Thompson, an older man to whom she finally loses her virginity. Deirdre no longer acts boy crazy, and Jeanie graduates from high school and is about to head off to college. After Madge and Jay's wedding, Jeanie visits Annie's grave and smokes a cigarette. With a smile, she muses that Annie wanted to be buried under a pear tree, "not in a box or anything", so that each year her friends could come by, have a pear, and say, "Annie's tastin' good this year, huh?"

== Cast ==
- Jodie Foster as Jeanie
- Scott Baio as Brad
- Sally Kellerman as Mary
- Randy Quaid as Jay Thompson
- Lois Smith as Mrs. Axman
- Adam Faith as Bryan
- Cherie Currie as Annie Mallick
- Marilyn Kagan as Madge Axman
- Kandice Stroh as Deirdre Tompkins
- Jill Barrie Bogart as Sissie Axman
- Wayne Storm as Frank Mallick
- Grant Wilson as Greg
- Fredric Lehne as Bobby
- Robert Romanus as Scott
- Roger Bowen as Mr. Simmons
- Laura Dern as Debbie
- Angel as themselves

== Production ==
The film was based on a script by Gerald Ayres, who was better known at the time for being a producer of such films as The Last Detail and Cisco Pike. He decided to move into screenwriting and had written what would become Rich and Famous before writing Foxes. Ayers says he started with the question, "What would happen if you dropped Louisa May Alcott into the San Fernando Valley today? She would have a different story to tell." He pitched the concept to Twentieth Century Fox who agreed to develop a script. Ayers went out and interviewed "around 40 girls" starting in March 1977 and finished a first draft by November 1977. "It isn't so much a duplication of the characters in Alcott as it is suggested by them," said Ayers. "Beth for example instead of being introverted has become quite extroverted."

The original title was Twentieth Century Foxes. Fox passed on the script and the project wound up with producer David Puttnam, who had a deal with Casablanca Pictures, for whom he had made Midnight Express. Puttnam said "When I first came out here [Los Angeles] I was fascinated by Beverly Hills teenagers, particularly with the problem of suicide. Gerry's script doesn't deal with that but it does touch on a lot of contemporary issues." Casablanca agreed to finance under its deal with United Artists.

Filming began on October 16, 1978, and wrapped in January 1979. The film was the feature directorial debut from Adrian Lyne. Producer David Puttnam had enjoyed success hiring debutant directors with a background in TV commercials (Ridley Scott, Alan Parker, Hugh Hudson) and that is where Lyne came from.

== Reception ==
Foxes grossed $7.5 million domestically. On the review aggregator website Rotten Tomatoes, the film holds an approval rating of 73% based on 11 reviews.

Gary Arnold of The Washington Post thought the film was an "exercise in fashionable prurience", admiring the "disco storytelling" with "exquisitely diffused, lemony California sunlight and neon-lit nightscapes." He thought the "trouble with his script is that it doesn't seem up to the task of depicting painful cautionary truths" and disliked how the adult characters were "deployed like walk-on gargoyles." Arnold concluded "to the extent that meanings emerge from the brazen, choppy parable, they seem garbled or platitudinous."

Film critic Roger Ebert gave the film a positive review, writing:

The movie follows its four foxes through several days and several adventures. It's a loosely structured film, deliberately episodic to suggest the shapeless form of these teenagers' typical days and nights. Things happen on impulse. Stuff comes up. Kids stay out all night, run away, get drunk, or get involved in what's supposed to be a civilized dinner party until it's crashed by a mob of greasers.

The subject of the movie is the way these events are seen so very differently by the kids and their parents. And at the heart of the movie is one particular, wonderful, and complicated parent-child relationship, between Jodie Foster and Sally Kellerman. They only have a few extended scenes together, but the material is written and acted with such sensitivity that we really understand the relationship.

== Home media ==
Foxes was released in a Region 1 DVD by Metro-Goldwyn-Mayer on August 5, 2003. A Blu-ray edition of the film was released by Kino Lorber on January 15, 2015.

== Awards ==
=== Nominations ===
- Young Artist Awards

Nominee: Best Young Actress Starring in a Motion Picture – Jodie Foster
