= The Better Half (play) =

1922 play by Noël Coward

Auriol Lee and (in mirror) Ian Fleming in the 1922 premiere

The Better Half is a one-act play by Noël Coward first performed in 1922 by the Grand Guignol theatre company, directed by Lewis Casson. It was thought to be lost until the original script was found in the British Library in 2007.

== Original production ==
The play was given as the final item of a quintuple bill of mixed comedy and melodrama at the Little Theatre, London on 31 May 1922, with the following cast:

- Alice – Auriol Lee
- Marion – Ivy Williams
- The Husband – Ian Fleming

Coward recalled that the piece "was wittily played by Auriol Lee", but:

In spite of this, it was received with apathy; I think, possibly, because it was a satire and too flippant in atmosphere after the full-blooded horrors that had gone before it. Nevertheless, it was quite well written and served the purpose, if only for a little, of keeping my name before the public."

== Plot ==
Alice has fallen out of love with her high-minded but bloodless husband, David. She discusses him with her friend Marion. It emerges that Marion finds him extremely attractive but her attempt to seduce him was unsuccessful. She leaves angrily when Alice declares that he is in love only with himself. David enters. Alice tries to provoke him by saying that she has been unfaithful to him, but he forgives her. She finally manages to enrage him by mocking his high-mindedness as a pose. The ensuing confrontation is halted by Marion's return. Alice then announces that since David and Marion have a similar outlook and are obviously made for each other, she is quite ready to relinquish him. To satisfy the divorce laws, she will take a lover and "live in flaming sin" at a de luxe hotel. She goes out, leaving the other two nonplussed. David tells Marion, "We should all try to make ourselves see things from every point of view".

== History ==
The Stage judged the piece "exceedingly well written, but too literary". The text was not published and was thought to be lost until Richard Hand and Mike Wilson, researching for a book about Grand Guignol, discovered the script in the British Library in September 2007, where it had been deposited as part of the Lord Chamberlain's Plays collection.

The Sticking Place theatre company revived the play at the Union Theatre in Southwark, London, in a production that opened on 16 October 2007. An adaptation of the play was broadcast on BBC Radio 4 on 25 May 2009, starring Federay Holmes, Samuel West and Lisa Dillon, and directed by Martin Jarvis.

== Sources ==
- Mander, Raymond; Joe Mitchenson (2000) [1957]. Theatrical Companion to Coward. Barry Day and Sheridan Morley (2000 edition, ed.) (second ed.). London: Oberon Books. ISBN 978-1-84002-054-0.
- Parker, John, ed. (1925). Who's Who in the Theatre (fifth ed.). London: Sir Isaac Pitman and Sons. OCLC 10013159.
