= Adele Longmire =

American actress (1918–2008)

- Longmire in 1943
- Born: June 27, 1918; New Orleans, Louisiana, U.S.
- Died: January 15, 2008 (aged 89); Taos, New Mexico, U.S.
- Occupation: Actress
- Spouse: Arthur Franz

Adele Longmire (June 27, 1918 – January 15, 2008) was an American actress.

== Early years ==
Longmire was born in New Orleans, Louisiana. She began acting when she had small parts in productions at St. Joseph's Academy convent school there. Following graduation, Longmire worked as a stenographer and acted with Le Petit Theatre du Vieux Carre, a Little Theatre in New Orleans.

== Considered for role of Scarlett O'Hara ==
While she was with the Vieux Carré theater, Longmire attracted the attention of the people responsible for casting parts in Gone with the Wind. Turning away from using open auditions, they felt that they might have more success with Little Theater groups and drama departments at colleges and universities. Longmire, "more than any other amateur actress they met, made them think of Scarlett O'Hara." In February 1937, Selznick International Pictures announced that Longmire and three other Southern young women had been asked to take screen tests. Talent scout Kay Brown headed the effort to sign Longmire, whom she and others in the group called the "Creole Girl". In April 1937, director George Cukor interrupted a cross-country train trip to stop in New Orleans to interview Longmire. Although he thought that she was not right for casting as Scarlett, he saw "intensity and real acting talent" in her and wanted producer David O. Selznick to sign her. Brown sought to have Longmire make a screen test in Los Angeles or New York, but her parents rejected the offer, which included paying all expenses for Longmire and her mother. Their main objection was the long-term nature of the contract that was being proposed. Additionally, Longmire was more interested in performing on stage than on film, even after Warner Bros. and Metro-Goldwyn-Mayer also showed interest in her.

== Career ==
Leaving New Orleans, Longmire ventured to New York. Unable to find work as an actress, she became an usherette in a theater. A tryout with the American Theater Council in February 1937 resulted in interviews with two producers for parts in projected productions, but neither project made it to Broadway. She played a neighbor in a production of the new play Eye on the Sparrow in the Plymouth Theatre in Boston in April 1938.

In the summer of 1938, she performed in Ruy Blas in the Central City Play Festival in Colorado, where director Elmer Rice saw her and left word for her to contact him in New York. After she returned to New York, Rice introduced her to Robert E. Sherwood, and they cast her as Ann Rutledge in Abe Lincoln in Illinois (1938). After that Broadway debut, Longmire portrayed Dolly in Two On An Island (1940), Deirdre Drake in Old Acquaintance (1940), Mary in Nine Girls (1943), and Kitty in Outrageous Fortune (1943) in other Broadway productions. Longmire's other stage performances included starring in Dream Girl in summer theater in Santa Fe, New Mexico, in August 1948.

Longmire signed a long-term contract with Warner Bros. in 1941, with the studio planning to have her re-create her role in Old Acquaintance in the film adaptation of that play. On film, Longmire was a member of the cast of Bullet Scars (1942) and played Mabel in People Will Talk (1951), Lieutenant Jane in Battle Circus (1952), and Carmelina in The Turning Point (1952).

During World War II, Longmire entertained for the United Service Organizations (USO). In 1945, she made a trailer film, Meet A Girl Who's Been There, to promote fundraising activities for the Community, USO, and War Fund. She made personal appearances in some theaters to boost the message of the film.

Television programs on which Longmire appeared included I Love Lucy, The Lone Ranger, Cavalcade of America, and Robert Montgomery Presents.

Longmire wrote Forever Is Now, a play about a USO troupe behind Italian lines during World War II. The comedy debuted on Broadway at the Hudson Theatre on September 24, 1945.

Late in her career, Longmire was a literary agent.

== Personal life and death ==
Longmire was married to actor Arthur Franz, with whom she had two children, Melissa Merrill and Gina Martenson. Longmire and Franz divorced in 1957. Longmire never remarried. On January 15, 2008, she died in Taos, New Mexico, at the age of 89.
