= Viola Roache =

American actress (1885–1961)

- Born: October 3, 1885; Norfolk, England
- Died: May 17, 1961 (aged 75); Los Angeles, California, U.S.
- Occupation: Actress
- Spouse: Lionel Bevans
- Children: Philippa Bevans

Viola Roache (October 3, 1885 - May 17, 1961) was an American actress who performed for more than 50 years. Her work included being a member of the original Broadway cast of My Fair Lady. A 1942 newspaper article described her as "one of the best-known character actresses on the American stage".

== Early years ==
Born in Norfolk, England, on October 3, 1885, Roache was the daughter of architect Frederick G. Roache and Ada T. Roache. When she was 8 years old, she was sent to an Ursuline convent in Tildonk, Belgium, "to get rid of my temper". She returned home when she was 17 and attended the Royal Academy of Dramatic Art in London. Her parents disapproved of her ambition to be an actress. Her first stage appearance occurred in April 1908 after she approached a manager in London who asked, "What can you do, little girl?" and she replied, "I want to act."

== Career ==
In 1908 Roache began acting "as an ingénue with wavy reddish-blonde hair and dark hazel eyes". She formed a repertory troupe and toured South Africa in 1912. The tour lasted a year, with the company traveling by train, automobile, and camel to English-speaking areas of the continent and to the Dutch veldt. Joining with Seymour Hicks, she toured Canada in 1913. Her American debut occurred in 1914, when she portrayed Elsa in Panthea at the Booth Theatre. for the next four years she performed with Henry Jewett's Repertory Company, after which she worked in stock theater in Boston.

Roache performed in stock theater in Toronto in 1930 and in Chicago in 1931. Also in the early 1930s she directed and performed with Clare Tree Major's Children's Theatres in the United States. In the early 1940s she taught private lessons on speech and diction to private students in New York. Her Broadway credits included portraying Mrs. Eynsford-Hill in My Fair Lady when it opened in 1956. She later played Mrs. Higgins and stayed in the show until late 1958.

Roache's work in film included Harriet Craig, based on the play Craig's Wife, in which she had acted. After she made that film, Columbia Pictures offered her a seven-year contract, which she turned down. In response to the negotiators' saying that the contract would provide security, she said, "I've never had security in my career, and I don't think I'd know what to do with it now."

Roache appeared regularly on television in a variety of programs. She said that after she began being seen in TV shows her recognition by the general public increased greatly.

== Personal life and death ==
Roache became an American citizen in 1953. Her marriage to actor Lionel Bevans ended in divorce. They had a daughter, actress Philippa Bevans. She died of a heart ailment at her daughters house in Los Angeles on May 17, 1961, aged 75.

== Critical response ==
Boyd Martin wrote in the (Louisville, Kentucky) Courier Journal about Roache's performance in Blithe Spirit,

As the medium, a role rich in vulgar but wholly natural and delightful comicalities, Roache captivated the audience last evening. Dressing the part with all the little trinkets so dear to the heart of such a soul, Miss Roache presents an amusing picture and lives up to this portrait with an amazing physical verve which dominates the action as well as the character's control dominates the wives.

== Papers ==
Photographs and reviews related to Roache and Bevans are held in the Billy Rose Theatre Division of the New York Public Library's archives and manuscripts. Some family pictures supplement those related to their professional work. Dates of the material range from 1920 to 1962, with most items from the 1950s and 1960s.

== Broadway plays ==
- Taking Chances (1915)
- Hobson's Choice (1915)
- The Woman Disputed (1926)
- The Bachelor Father (1928)
- Sweet Stranger (1930)
- The Bellamy Trial (1931)
- The Merchant of Venice (1931)
- The Distaff Side (1934)
- The Simpleton of the Unexpected Isles (1935)
- Pride and Prejudice (1935)
- Call It a Day (1936)
- Madame Bovary (1937)
- I Am My Youth (1938)
- The Man from Cairo (1938)
- The Two Bouquets (1938)
- Lorelei (1938)
- Wuthering Heights (1939)
- Theatre (1941)
- Bird in Hand (1942)
- Sweet Charity (1942)
- No Way Out (1944)
- Hand in Glove (1944)
- The Haven (1946)
- Craig's Wife (1947)
- Angel in the Wings (1947)
- Make Way for Lucia (1948)
- Cyrano de Bergerac (1953)
- Richard III (1953)
- What Every Woman Knows (1954)
- My Fair Lady (1956)
