= Diversion (play) =

1927 play

- Written by: John Van Druten
- Original language: English
- Genre: Drama

Premiere
- Date premiered: 27 August 1927
- Place premiered: Lyceum Theatre, Rochester, New York

Diversion is a 1927 play by the British writer John Van Druten. It was first staged in the United States at the Lyceum Theatre in Rochester before beginning a 68 run performance at the 49th Street Theatre in 1928. In London it ran for a combined 101 performances at the Arts Theatre and Little Theatre between 26 September and 22 December 1928. The cast included Maurice Evans, C.V. France, Cathleen Nesbitt and Mignon O'Doherty.

== Film adaptation ==
In 1929 the play was adapted into a film The Careless Age by First National Pictures. It was directed by John Griffith Wray and starred Douglas Fairbanks Jr. and Carmel Myers.

== Bibliography ==
- Goble, Alan. The Complete Index to Literary Sources in Film. Walter de Gruyter, 1999.
- Wearing, J. P. The London Stage 1920-1929: A Calendar of Productions, Performers, and Personnel. Rowman & Littlefield, 2014.
