= If I Were Free =

1933 film

- Directed by: Elliott Nugent
- Screenplay by: Dwight Taylor
- Based on: Behold, We Live; 1932 play by John Van Druten
- Produced by: Merian C. Cooper
- Starring: Irene Dunne; Clive Brook; Nils Asther; Henry Stephenson; Vivian Tobin
- Cinematography: Edward Cronjager
- Edited by: Arthur Roberts
- Music by: Roy Webb
- Production company: RKO Pictures
- Distributed by: RKO Pictures
- Release date: December 1, 1933
- Running time: 66 minutes
- Country: United States
- Language: English

If I Were Free is a 1933 American pre-Code drama film directed by Elliott Nugent and written by Dwight Taylor, based on the play, Behold, We Live by John Van Druten. The film stars Irene Dunne, Clive Brook, Nils Asther and Henry Stephenson. The film was released on December 1, 1933, by RKO Pictures.

== Plot ==
A suicidal World War I veteran and an antique dealer, both of whom are married to different people, embark on a love affair.

== Cast ==
- Irene Dunne as Sarah Cazenove
- Clive Brook as Gordon Evers
- Nils Asther as Tono Casanove
- Henry Stephenson as Hector Stribling
- Vivian Tobin as Jewel Stribling
- Laura Hope Crews as Dame Evers
- Tempe Pigott as Mrs. Gill

== See also ==
- List of American films of 1933
