= Rich and Famous (1981 film) =

1981 film by George Cukor

- Original poster
- Directed by: George Cukor
- Screenplay by: Gerald Ayres
- Based on: Old Acquaintance; 1940 play by John Van Druten
- Produced by: William Allyn
- Starring: Jacqueline Bisset; Candice Bergen; David Selby; Hart Bochner
- Cinematography: Donald Peterman
- Edited by: John F. Burnett
- Music by: Georges Delerue
- Production company: Metro-Goldwyn-Mayer
- Distributed by: United Artists
- Release date: September 23, 1981
- Running time: 117 minutes
- Country: United States
- Language: English
- Budget: $11.5 million
- Box office: $5.1 million or $14.5 million

Rich and Famous is a 1981 American drama film directed by George Cukor, the final film of his career. The screenplay by Gerald Ayres is based on the 1940 play Old Acquaintance by John Van Druten, which was previously filmed in 1943 by Vincent Sherman under its original title, starring Bette Davis and Miriam Hopkins.

The film was released to commercial failure and a mixed critical response.

== Plot ==
Two women find their friendship is tested when one rises from obscurity to success while the other stagnates in a stalled career. Liz Hamilton, a young woman with literary ambitions, and Merry Noel Blake, an all-American blonde beauty from Atlanta, are close friends who met while they were freshmen at Smith College in the 1950s.

Soon after graduation, Liz writes a critically acclaimed book and drifts into unfulfilling relationships and one-night stands, including an empty encounter in an airplane lavatory, a fling with a teenaged hustler, and an affair with Chris Adams, a young reporter for Rolling Stone. Meanwhile, Merry fulfills her aspiration to a life of domesticity caring for a husband and child by marrying Doug Blake and moving to a beach house in Malibu, California.

Although Merry is happy, she can't help but envy Liz for her glamorous career as an author. Merry decides to write a book of her own, relying on Liz's assistance. The trashy roman à clef about the Malibu colony finds a publisher and becomes a huge best-seller. Merry soon is a darling of the media, and her fame and fortune surpass those of Liz (who is experiencing a severe case of writer's block), leading to jealousy between the old friends and problems in Merry's marriage.

The film takes place over the course of 22 years, first depicting the elopement of Merry and Doug in 1959, and then picking up during three segments, taking place in 1969, 1975 and 1981, showing changes in the characters' relationships (and society) over the course of two decades.

== Cast ==
- Jacqueline Bisset as Liz Hamilton
- Candice Bergen as Merry Noel Blake
- David Selby as Doug Blake
- Hart Bochner as Chris Adams
- Steven Hill as Jules Levi
- Michael Brandon as Max
- Meg Ryan as Debby Blake (age 18)
- Nicole Eggert as Debby Blake (age 8)
- Matt Lattanzi as Jim
- Daniel Faraldo as Ginger Trinidad
- Fay Kanin as Professor Fields

Cameos

- Nina Foch
- Dick Cavett
- Ray Bradbury
- Merv Griffin
- Marsha Hunt
- Christopher Isherwood
- Gavin Lambert
- Roger Vadim
- Paul Morrissey
- Frank De Felitta
- Frances Bergen
- Alan Berliner
- Randal Kleiser

== Production ==
Robert Mulligan originally was slated to direct, but when members of the American Federation of Television and Radio Artists and the Screen Actors Guild went on strike four days after filming began, the production shut down. Mulligan was forced to withdraw when previous commitments conflicted with the new schedule. The film proved to be the last directed by Cukor. It also marked the screen debuts of an 8-year-old Nicole Eggert and Meg Ryan, who played Merry's daughter in the 1969 and 1981 segments, respectively.

=== Filming ===
New York City locations seen in the film include the Algonquin Hotel, the Saint Regis and the Waldorf Astoria. Additional locations include Madison, New Jersey (standing in for Northampton, Massachusetts), Los Angeles, and Malibu. Interiors were filmed at the Metro-Goldwyn-Mayer Studios in Culver City. Sets were later rented for use in the Biltmore Hotel scenes in the 1984 blockbuster Ghostbusters.

=== Music ===
The soundtrack includes "Take Me for a Buggy Ride", performed by Bessie Smith, and "On the Sunny Side of the Street", sung by Willie Nelson.

== Critical reception ==
The film received generally mixed reviews. Vincent Canby of The New York Times wrote "The movie can't make up its mind whether it's about a tumultuously difficult but rewarding friendship or whether it's a sendup of the contemporary literary scene. It fails as both...The culprit is Gerald Ayres...[who] has spread his talents very thin...Though he has written two big roles, he doesn't seem capable of writing either a romantic drama, like The Turning Point, or an informed satire...Mr. Ayres can occasionally write good wisecracks...But he has no particular insight into the publishing scene. Nor does he ever convince us of the enduring strength of the friendship that lasts through thick and, more often, thin. Though Misses Bisset and Bergen are appealing actresses, Rich and Famous doesn't hold together."

Roger Ebert of the Chicago Sun-Times observed "This film is a real curiosity. It's a good-bad movie, like The Other Side of Midnight or The Greek Tycoon. It contains scenes that make you want to squirm because of their awkwardness and awfulness, and yet you don't want to look away and you're not bored. The movie has the courage to go to extremes, and some of those extremes may not be art but are certainly unforgettable...It's a slick, trashy, entertaining melodrama, with too many dumb scenes to qualify as successful."

Variety wrote "While not without its problems, Rich and Famous is an absorbing drama of some notable qualities, the greatest of which is a gutsy, fascinating and largely magnificent performance by Jacqueline Bisset...For a bright, sophisticated piece such as this, particularly one under the guidance of the irrepressibly elegant George Cukor, the somewhat harsh, murky visual style is surprising."

TV Guide rated the film one out of four stars and wrote "This could have been – and is – a very funny film; unfortunately, most of the laughs are unintentional...Although his version of Van Druten's play Old Acquaintance is sexier than the original 1943 screen treatment...it also fails to satisfy on many levels...This glossy soap opera suffers from Cukor's failure to control his actors. Moreover, the costumes are atrocious. The film simply lacks the sophisticated style that made Cukor famous."

Pauline Kael of The New Yorker wrote "Rich and Famous isn't camp, exactly: It's more like a homosexual fantasy. Jacqueline Bisset's affairs, with their masochistic overtones, are creepy, because they don't seem like what a woman would get into. And Candice Bergen is used almost as if she were a big, goosey, female impersonator."

Time Out London wrote "Considering neither Bisset nor Bergen had ever shown the slightest acting ability before in movies, their performances in the Bette Davis/Miriam Hopkins roles in this loose reworking of Old Acquaintance are very capable...Of course much of the credit must go to Cukor, the veteran 'woman's director'; but the film disappoints in its unconfident handling of the secondary characters."

On the review aggregator website Rotten Tomatoes, 60% of 15 critics' reviews are positive.

== Awards and nominations ==
Gerald Ayres won the Writers Guild Award for Best Comedy Adapted from Another Medium.
