= Flowers of the Forest (play) =

1934 play

- Written by: John Van Druten
- Original language: English
- Genre: Drama

Premiere
- Date premiered: 20 November 1934
- Place premiered: Whitehall Theatre

Flowers of the Forest is a 1934 play by the British writer John Van Druten. It lasted for a brief West End run of fourteen performances at the Whitehall Theatre with a cast including Henry Oscar, Haddon Mason, Stephen Haggard, Barry K. Barnes and Lewis Casson. In New York it played for forty performances at the Broadway Martin Beck Theatre with a cast that included Hugh Williams and Burgess Meredith.

== Bibliography ==
- Bordman, Gerald . American Theatre: A Chronicle of Comedy and Drama, 1930-1969. Oxford University Press, 1996.
- Wearing, J.P. The London Stage 1930-1939: A Calendar of Productions, Performers, and Personnel. Rowman & Littlefield, 2014.
