= The Turning Point (1952 film) =

1952 film by William Dieterle

- Theatrical release poster
- Directed by: William Dieterle
- Screenplay by: Warren Duff
- Story by: Horace McCoy
- Produced by: Irving Asher
- Starring: William Holden; Edmond O'Brien; Alexis Smith
- Cinematography: Lionel Lindon
- Edited by: George Tomasini
- Color process: Black and white
- Production company: Paramount Pictures
- Distributed by: Paramount Pictures
- Release date: November 14, 1952 (New York City)
- Running time: 85 minutes
- Country: United States
- Language: English

The Turning Point is a 1952 American film noir crime film directed by William Dieterle and starring William Holden, Edmond O'Brien and Alexis Smith. It was inspired by the Kefauver Committee's hearings dealing with organized crime.

== Plot ==
John Conroy is a Special Prosecutor given extraordinary powers to break up the crime syndicate in a large midwestern town. His investigation will focus on Neil Eichelberger and his criminal operation. A local journalist, Jerry McKibbon, is sympathetic to this but feels Conroy isn't experienced enough to handle the task. Matt Conroy, John Conroy's father, is a local policeman assigned to be his chief investigator.

McKibbon discovers that Matt Conroy is a crooked cop, working for Eichelberger, so he demands that Matt break with the mobster or he'll inform John Conroy of the duplicity. For Matt to vindicate himself, it is decided that he will procure a damning file from the D.A.'s office that Eichelberger has requested, after safely copying it first.

Even before this double-cross is exposed, Eichelberger decides to have Matt Conroy murdered in order to instill fear in his operation showing that Eichelberger is in control of the situation, since John Conroy's investigation is more serious than expected. Matt Conroy is killed during a phony robbery, and his assassin, Monty LaRue, is immediately killed in turn.

John Conroy's investigation is systematically uncovering Eichelberger's crimes, and in anticipation of having their books subpoenaed, Eichelberger has the building housing them burned. He has callous disregard for the people renting there, and all but 1 or 2 are killed. An expose of Matt Conroy's murder reveals that Eichelberger had LaRue killed also.

His widow Carmelina LaRue can prove this. She contacts McKibbon in order to exact revenge but is chased away by Eichelberger's henchmen. Since McKibbon is the only one that can identify Carmelina LaRue, her husband's murderer, Roy Ackerman, demands that McKibbon be killed, but Eichelberger refuses. Ackerman then hires a hit man himself whereby McKibbon is lured to a boxing match where he can be shot.

Meanwhile, Carmelina manages to reach John Conroy. Her testimony is sufficient, along with already acquired information, to topple Eichelberger. The hired gun, Red, shoots McKibbon. As he lies dying, Eichelberger and his crew are arrested. McKibbon dies before John Conroy can arrive.

John Conroy's epitaph for McKibbon is something McKibbon himself has previously said: "Sometimes someone has to pay an exorbitant price to uphold the majesty of the law."

== Cast ==
- William Holden as Jerry McKibbon
- Edmond O'Brien as John Conroy
- Alexis Smith as Amanda Waycross
- Tom Tully as Matt Conroy
- Ed Begley as Neil Eichelberger
- Danny Dayton as Roy Ackerman
- Adele Longmire as Carmelina LaRue
- Ray Teal as Clint, Police Captain
- Ted de Corsia as Eamon Harrigan
- Don Porter as Joe Silbray
- Howard Freeman as Fogel
- Neville Brand as Red

== Production ==
Several locations of historical interest in Downtown Los Angeles can be seen in this film. The original Angel's Flight funicular railway is part of one scene. The Hotel Belmont can also be seen. Other buildings that can be seen are the San Fernando Building in the Bank District and a Metropolitan Water District building at 3rd and Broadway. The final scene is at the Olympic Auditorium, the premiere boxing arena in Los Angeles for many years.

Actress Carolyn Jones made her motion picture debut in the film.

== Radio adaptation ==
The Turning Point was presented on Broadway Playhouse May 13, 1953. The 30-minute adaptation starred Dane Clark.
