= The Careless Age =

1929 film

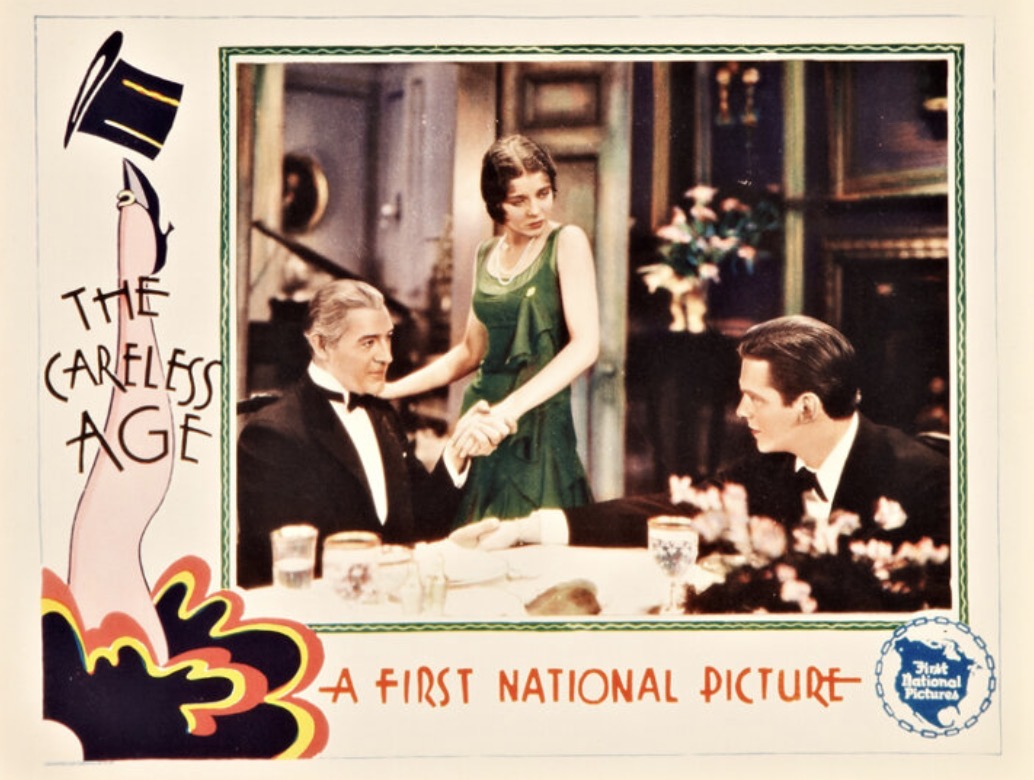
- Lobby Card
- Directed by: John Griffith Wray
- Screenplay by: Harrison Macklyn; Harold Shumate
- Based on: Diversion by John Van Druten
- Starring: Douglas Fairbanks Jr. Carmel Myers; Holmes Herbert; Kenneth Thomson; Loretta Young
- Cinematography: Alvin Knechtel; Ben F. Reynolds
- Production company: First National Pictures
- Distributed by: Warner Bros. Pictures
- Release date: September 15, 1929
- Running time: 65 minutes
- Country: United States
- Languages: Sound (All-Talking); English
- Budget: $149,000
- Box office: $411,000

The Careless Age is a 1929 American pre-Code drama film directed by John Griffith Wray and written by Harrison Macklyn and Harold Shumate. It is based on the 1927 play Diversion by John Van Druten. The film stars Douglas Fairbanks Jr., Carmel Myers, Holmes Herbert, Kenneth Thomson, and Loretta Young. The film was released by Warner Bros. Pictures on September 15, 1929.

== Plot ==
Wyn Hayward, the idealistic son of famed London surgeon Sir John Hayward, is immersed in his medical studies under the watchful eye of his father. His intense dedication leaves little time for Muriel, Sir John's lovely young ward, who quietly adores him. His older brother Owen, more cynical and worldly, mocks Wyn's seriousness and sheltered nature.

Recognizing that Wyn needs a break, Sir John sends him on a holiday to Lake Como. There, Wyn is summoned to the apartment of Rayetta Muir, a glamorous and temperamental stage star, to tend to a supposed illness. Though not yet licensed to practice, Wyn is pressured into examining her. Isolated and bored by the quiet resort, Rayetta finds the young, earnest Wyn an amusing distraction—and he soon falls deeply in love with her.

They share a brief but passionate affair. When Rayetta returns to her bustling life in London's theater world, Wyn follows, intoxicated by love but ill-prepared for the emotional consequences. In the city, he finds Rayetta already entangled with two other men: Lord Durhugh, an aging aristocrat, and LeGrand, a flashy French boxer. To her, Wyn is just a romantic interlude—one of many.

Wyn becomes obsessed and increasingly unstable. When Rayetta visits the Hayward home, meeting Sir John and Muriel, tensions rise. Muriel senses the connection and is heartbroken. Meanwhile, Rayetta, tiring of Wyn's intensity, attempts to distance herself.

On New Year's Eve, driven by jealousy and humiliation, Wyn storms into a party at Rayetta's apartment. There, he overhears her casually discussing her dalliances with Durhugh and LeGrand. In a blind rage, he attacks her and strangles her—then flees, believing he has killed her.

He returns home in despair and confesses the crime to his father. Horrified, Sir John offers to take the blame, hoping to protect his son's future. He rushes to Rayetta's apartment to destroy any evidence. But fate intervenes: a doctor is already on the scene, having revived Rayetta. Sir John is assumed to be the physician summoned to assist.

Moments later, Wyn arrives to find Rayetta alive and well, and both father and son realize they are spared from tragedy. In a moving conclusion, the two embrace—Wyn deeply changed by the emotional storm he has weathered.

== Cast ==
- Douglas Fairbanks Jr. as Wyn
- Carmel Myers as Rayetta
- Holmes Herbert as Sir John
- Kenneth Thomson as Owen
- Loretta Young as Muriel
- George Baxter as Le Grand
- Wilfred Noy as Lord Durhugh
- Doris Lloyd as Mabs
- Ilka Chase as Bunty
- Raymond Lawrence as Tommy

== Music ==
The film featured two songs, "Melody Divine" and "Say It With A Solitaire," both of which were composed by Herman Ruby and Norman Spencer.

== Box office ==
According to Warner Bros records the film earned $266,000 domestically and $145,000 foreign.

== See also ==
- List of early sound feature films (1926–1929)
