= Sea Fever (play) =

- Written by: Auriol Lee; John Van Druten
- Original language: English
- Genre: Drama
- Setting: Marseille, France

Premiere
- Date premiered: 30 June 1931
- Place premiered: New Theatre, London

Sea Fever is a 1931 British play by Auriol Lee and John Van Druten. It is based on the 1929 play Marius by Marcel Pagnol about Marius, a young man in Marseille whose desire to go to sea overcomes his developing romance with a local girl.

It was staged at the New Theatre in the West End but was not successful, lasting for only six performances. The Sunday Times described it as being all atmosphere and no plot. The cast included Maurice Evans, Peggy Ashcroft, Norman McKinnel, and Mary Clare.

== Bibliography ==
- Wearing, J.P. The London Stage 1930-1939: A Calendar of Productions, Performers, and Personnel. Rowman & Littlefield, 2014.
