= Robert James Lee =

English physician

Robert James Lee FRCP (9 November 1841, St James Parish, London – 17 November 1924, West Drayton, Middlesex) was an English physician. He published papers on diseases of children and on the "treatment of pulmonary phthisis by antiseptic vapours".

== Biography ==
He had two younger brothers, James Irwin Lee (1843–1880) and John Francis Lee (1850–1905), both of whom graduated from the University of Cambridge. The father of the three brothers was the obstetrician Robert Lee, who held the chair of midwifery at St George's Hospital.

After education at King's College School and Brighton College, Robert James Lee matriculated in May 1859 at Caius College, Cambridge. During his undergraduate years he was both a runner and an oarsman. He read natural sciences and graduated with a B.A. in 1863. After studying medicine in London at St George's Hospital and at St Thomas Hospital and in Paris, he graduated with his M.B. degree in 1865. In 1866 he qualified as M.R.C.P. In 1869 he graduated from the University of Cambridge with both M.A. and M.D.

At the beginning of his career, he was appointed as a physician to Marylebone's Western General Dispensary and as a lecturer on forensic medicine and pathology at the Westminster Hospital. Later in his career he was appointed to St George's Hospital as an assistant obstetric physician, as well as a lecturer on obstetric medicine. He was also appointed to London's Hospital for Sick Children (later renamed Great Ormond Street Hospital) as an assistant physician with eventual promotion to full physician.

In 1874 he delivered the Goulstonian Lectures and was elected a Fellow of the Royal College of Physicians.

He spent the years from 1910 to 1924 in retirement in West Drayton. One of his two daughters was the actress Auriol Lee.

== Selected publications ==
=== Articles ===
- Lee, Robert J. (1872). "On Phlegmasia Dolens: Its Origin & Its Connexion with Erysipelas and Other Infectious Diseases" (PDF). The Lancet. 99 (2537): 497–498. doi:10.1016/S0140-6736(02)61916-6. (See phlegmasia alba dolens and erysipelas.)
- Lee, R. J. (1873-03-08). "Exercise and Training". BMJ. 1 (636): 271. doi:10.1136/bmj.1.636.271-a. PMC 2293446.
- Lee, R. (1874). "On a Case of Puerperal Infection" (PDF). The Lancet. 104 (2674): 755. doi:10.1016/S0140-6736(02)31211-X.
- Lee, R. J. (1875-02-06). "Maternal Impressions". BMJ. 1 (736): 167–169. doi:10.1136/bmj.1.736.167. ISSN 0959-8138. PMC 2295526. PMID 20747753.
- Lee, R. J. (1877-07-21). "Remarks on the Treatment of Tinea Tonsurans". BMJ. 2 (864): 74. doi:10.1136/bmj.2.864.74. ISSN 0959-8138. PMC 2221364. PMID 20748591.
- Lee, R. J. (1877-12-08). "The Importance of Preserving a Vacuum in the Pleural Cavity after Paracentesis of the Thorax and the Insertion of the Drainage-Tube; with Description of a Method by which Continuous Aspiration may be Effected". BMJ. 2 (884): 794–795. doi:10.1136/bmj.2.884.794. ISSN 0959-8138. PMC 2221595. PMID 20748699.
- Lee, R. J. (1878-06-08). "Cases Illustrating the Family History of Syphilis: With Remarks". BMJ. 1 (910): 819–821. doi:10.1136/bmj.1.910.819. ISSN 0959-8138. PMC 2221311. PMID 20748881.
- Lee, R. J. (1879-03-01). "Influence of Whooping-Cough as One of the Chief Causes of Infant Mortality". BMJ. 1 (948): 307–308. doi:10.1136/bmj.1.948.307. ISSN 0959-8138. PMC 2239532. PMID 20749139.
- Lee, R. J. (1882-06-24). "The Scientific Principles of Inhalation". BMJ. 1 (1121): 937. doi:10.1136/bmj.1.1121.937. ISSN 0959-8138. PMC 2371866. PMID 20750230.
- Lee, R. (1882). "The Cutaneous Diseases of Children" (PDF). The Lancet. 120 (3084): 564–566. doi:10.1016/S0140-6736(02)12415-9.
- Lee, R. J. (1884-05-16). "Atmospheric Disinfection". British Medical Journal. 1 (1220): 973–974. doi:10.1136/bmj.1.1220.973-b. PMC 2307336.
- Lee, Robert J. (1885). "Clinical Lecture on Malformations of the Heart" (PDF). The Lancet. 125 (3209): 371–372. doi:10.1016/S0140-6736(02)32740-5.
- Lee, R. (1888). "The Fumifier:: A Descriptive Account of Its Construction and Use" (PDF). The Lancet. 131 (3377): 967–968. doi:10.1016/S0140-6736(02)16195-2.
- Lee, Robert J. (January 4, 1896). "Sir Henry Halford, Bart., and the Stethoscope" (PDF). The Lancet. 147 (3775): 68–69. doi:10.1016/S0140-6736(01)60745-1. (See Henry Halford.)

=== Books ===
- Lee, R.J. (1873). Exercise and Training, Their Effects Upon Health. Smith, Elder & Company.
- Lee, R.J. (1885). Lectures Delivered at the Hospital for Sick Children, Great Ormond Street, 1883-1884 (2nd ed.). Baillière, Tindall & Cox.
