= Make Way for Lucia =

1948 British comedy play

- Written by: John Van Druten
- Original language: English
- Genre: Comedy

Premiere
- Date premiered: 22 December 1948
- Place premiered: Cort Theatre, New York City

Make Way for Lucia is a 1948 comedy play by the British writer John Van Druten. It is based on the 1931 novel Mapp and Lucia by E. F. Benson. In a small town in between the wars England, a pretentious new arrival, Lucia, crosses sword with the local queen bee Miss Mapp.

The play ran for 29 performances at the Cort Theatre on Broadway from 22 December 1948 to 15 January 1949. The cast included Isabel Jeans, Catherine Willard as the two leads, with Cyril Ritchard, Ivan Simpson, Viola Roache and Philip Tonge.

The production featured sets and costumes by Lucinda Ballard.
