= Behold, We Live =

- Written by: John Van Druten
- Original language: English
- Genre: Drama

Premiere
- Date premiered: 16 August 1932
- Place premiered: St James's Theatre

Behold, We Live is a 1932 play by the British writer John Van Druten. It had an original West End run of 158 performances at St James's Theatre in London between 16 August and 31 December 1932. It was produced by Gilbert Miller. The cast included Gerald du Maurier, Gertrude Lawrence, May Whitty, Ronald Ward and Everley Gregg.

== Adaptation ==
In 1933 it was turned into a Hollywood film If I Were Free starring Irene Dunne, Clive Brook, Nils Asther.

== Bibliography ==
- Goble, Alan. The Complete Index to Literary Sources in Film. Walter de Gruyter, 1999.
- Wearing, J.P. The London Stage 1930-1939: A Calendar of Productions, Performers, and Personnel. Rowman & Littlefield, 2014.
