= Philippa Bevans =

United States-based English-born actress

- Born: February 10, 1913
- Died: May 10, 1968 (aged 55)

Philippa Mary Bevans (10 February 1913 – 10 May 1968) was an English actress of stage and screen.

== Early years ==
Bevans was born in London, the daughter of actors Lionel Bevans and Viola Roache. She originally appeared as a child actress on stage. She was raised in Boston and attended the Woodward School for Girls. She grew up wanting to be an actress.

== Career ==
In 1931, Bevans performed with the Jitney Players. A review of their production of Caste in The (Baltimore, Maryland) Sun called Bevans "by far the most gifted and lovely young actress to appear here with this company".

Along with her mother, Bevans was part of the cast of the original 1956 Broadway production of My Fair Lady that starred Rex Harrison and Julie Andrews. Bevans is also featured on the original cast recording.

On television, Bevans was a regular on Search for Tomorrow and had a recurring role on the Sergeant Bilko Show. She played Mrs. Landers, the sympathetic housekeeper of Professor Ellis Fowler (played by Donald Pleasence) in S3 E37 "The Changing of the Guard" on The Twilight Zone, which aired on 31 May 1962.

== Death ==
Bevans died on May 10, 1968, in Lenox Hill Hospital in New York City, aged 55.

== Filmography ==
Year	Title	Role	Notes
1962	The Alfred Hitchcock Hour	Mrs. Anthony	Season 1 Episode 11: "Ride the Nightmare"
1962	The Notorious Landlady	Mrs. Agatha Brown	
1964	The World of Henry Orient	Emma Hambler	
1966	The Group	Mrs. Hartshorn	
1968	Madigan	Mrs. Hewitt	(final film role)
