= Somebody Knows =

1932 mystery play by John Van Druten

- Written by: John Van Druten
- Original language: English
- Genre: Drama

Premiere
- Date premiered: 12 May 1932
- Place premiered: St Martin's Theatre

Somebody Knows is a 1932 mystery play by the British writer John Van Druten about an entertainer who is accused of strangling a prostitute. Following a court case there is not enough evidence to convict him, leaving the audience unsure of his actual guilt.

It was staged at St Martin's Theatre in the West End, running for 43 performances between 12 May and 18 June 1932. The cast included Frank Lawton, Lawrence Hanray, Enid Stamp-Taylor and Cathleen Nesbitt.

It was comparatively unsuccessful at a time when many of Van Druten's work's were enjoying commercial success. He attributed this to the fact that audiences expected a standard whodunnit while he was interested in developing a character study.

== Bibliography ==
- Kabatchnik, Amnon. Blood on the Stage, 1925-1950: Milestone Plays of Crime, Mystery, and Detection : an Annotated Repertoire. Scarecrow Press, 2010.
- Wearing, J.P. The London Stage 1930-1939: A Calendar of Productions, Performers, and Personnel. Rowman & Littlefield, 2014.
- Weintraub, Stanley. Modern British Dramatists, 1900-1945: M-Z. Gale Research Company, 1982.
