= Bullet Scars =

1942 film by D. Ross Lederman

- Film poster
- Directed by: D. Ross Lederman
- Screenplay by: Robert E. Kent
- Based on: an idea by Charles Belden and Sy Bartlett
- Starring: Regis Toomey; Adele Longmire; Howard da Silva
- Cinematography: Ted McCord; A.S.C.
- Edited by: James Gibbon
- Music by: Howard Jackson
- Production company: Warner Bros.–First National
- Distributed by: Warner Bros. Pictures
- Release date: March 7, 1942
- Running time: 59 minutes
- Country: United States
- Language: English

Bullet Scars is a 1942 American crime film produced and distributed by Warner Bros. Pictures. It was directed by D. Ross Lederman with top-billed stars Regis Toomey, Adele Longmire and Howard da Silva.

== Plot ==
Gangster Frank Dillon is on the run with his gang after a bank robbery in which one of them, Joe Madison, sustained a serious bullet wound and a fractured skull. The gang stops at a doctor's office, but when the doctor tries to call the police to report the gunshot wound, Dillon kills him.

Dillon hides in a lodge and sends for nurse Nora Madison, who comes because she is Joe's sister. Knowing that she does not have the skill to treat her brother, she insists on a doctor. Dillon finds Dr. Steven Bishop, who is preparing to leave for a research assignment. Dillon promises to build Bishop a complete research lab and pay him $500 a month if he will stay and heal Joe. He pretends that it was he who accidentally shot Joe, and that he now wants a doctor on hand to look after Joe and his friends while they are staying at the cabin. Bishop accepts, not realizing who Dillon is.

Bishop and Nora operate on Joe, who remains paralyzed and unable to speak, but can answer questions by blinking his eyes. Bishop and Nora gradually become closer, much to Dillon's displeasure, as he feels that Nora belongs to him. Nora tries to warn Bishop about Dillon, but is constrained by members of the gang always watching them, but gradually Bishop begins to understand who Dillon is and, when Joe dies, Nora explains that Dillon will now kill them both. They conceal Joe's death, and Bishop asks Dillon to send two members of the gang to the pharmacist for medicine. Bishop writes a prescription in what he tells Dillon is pharmaceutical Latin, but it is actually information about the gang's location.

The pharmacist calls the sheriff, who calls in state troopers, resulting in a climactic shootout in which the gang is wiped out. Bishop and Nora find their happy ending.

== Cast ==
- Regis Toomey as Dr. Steven Bishop
- Adele Longmire as Nora Madison
- Howard da Silva as Frank Dillon
- Ben Welden as Pills Davis
- John Ridgely as Hank O'Connor
- Frank Wilcox as Mike
- Michael Ames as Joe Madison
- Hobart Bosworth as Dr. Carter
- Roland Drew as Jake
- Walter Brooke as Leary
- Creighton Hale as Jess
- Hank Mann as Gilly
- Sol Gorss as Dude
- Don Turner as Mitch

Uncredited (in order of appearance)
William Hopper	bank teller who is shot after stepping on alarm button
George Meeker	police radio announcer of bank robbery
Fred Kelsey	police chief answering reporters' questions about pursuit of bank robbers
Frank Mayo	Frank, police chief's deputy who ushers the reporters into the chief's office
Glen Cavender	reporter who asks the chief, "Was one of them shot?"
Stuart Holmes	reporter who asks the chief, "Have you got any witnesses to identify the mob chief?"
Charles Drake	reporter who asks the chief, "What about the washout at Pinehurst [or Penhurst]? Are they blocking off the detours?"
Vera Lewis	car driver's wife who says, "What's the meaning of this? Charles you drive right ahead. We've done nothing wrong."
Leo White	Charles, the car driver who says, "but officer, I... I..."
Jack Mower	roadblock officer who says, "That's all right, brother. I know just how you feel. My wife tells me how to drive too."
Ray Montgomery	news photographer at police shootout with robbers who says, "This is terrific."

== Reception ==
In a contemporary review for The New York Times, critic Thomas M. Pryor called Bullet Scars "a lot of 'bang bang' noise; nothing more" and wrote: "The Warners must have been kidding when they solemnly renounced the production of B pictures a while back, for 'Bullet Scars' ... has a familiar buzz about it."
