= Gerald Ayres =

American film producer

Gerald Ayres (February 3, 1936 – April 7, 2018) was an American film studio executive, producer and screenwriter. He is known for his work as producer of The Last Detail (1973) starring Jack Nicholson and as writer of Rich and Famous (1981) the last film directed by George Cukor.

== Early life and education ==
Ayres was born in San Diego, California to US Navy seaman Bickings Ayres and Madeline Brown Ayres; he had one brother who died as a young man.

Ayres received a scholarship to Yale University. During this time a number of his plays were produced. He dropped out a few months short of graduation to take up a career as a theatre writer in New York.

== Career ==
=== Film ===
Ayres worked in New York in 1957 as a theatre writer and play doctor. Between writing jobs he worked in a zipper factory in the garment district and as a story analyst for the New York office of Columbia Pictures. In 1964, he was brought to Columbia's Hollywood studio as assistant to new studio chief, Mike Frankovich. During the next five years a number of years the studio released a number of successful films, including Lawrence of Arabia, A Man for All Seasons, Guess Whose Coming to Dinner, In Cold Blood, Georgie Girl, Oliver, To Sir With Love, and Funny Girl. When Frankovich left in 1971, Ayres was made creative head of the studio.

In 1970, Ayres served as producer of The Model Shop directed by French author Jaques Demy and starring Anouk Aimee and Gary Lockwood, but was not credited because of his position as studio executive. At that time he tried unsuccessfully to secure financing for Demy's wife, Agnes Varda, to direct a script she had written, Peace and Love.

Ayres next produced for Columbia the small film, Cisco Pike in 1971, starring Kris Kristofferson, Gene Hackman and Karen Black. In 1973, he produced The Last Detail, which was nominated for three Academy Awards: Jack Nicholson as actor, Robert Towne as screenwriter and Randy Quaid as supporting actor. The film won BAFTA's best picture award and Nicholson won best actor laurels at Cannes. Columbia executives considered the film "un-American", and Ayres took the production to Toronto.

In 1979, Ayres wrote the script for Foxes, starring Jodie Foster which he co-produced with David Puttnam. He wrote the screenplay for Rich and Famous, which as released in 1981, starring starred Jacqueline Bisset and Candice Bergen. He was awarded the Writers Guild of America Award for Best Comedy Adapted from Another Medium.

=== Television ===
Ayres worked on a television adaptation of The Last Detail in 1981. The pilot was directed by Jackie Cooper, but it did not get picked up.

Ayres wrote the shooting draft of the 1992 ABC film Stormy Weathers, starring Cybill Shepherd.

For TNT Ayres wrote 1993's Crazy in Love, starring Holly Hunter, Frances McDormand, Bill Pullman and Julian Sands. He received nominations for Artois, Golden Globe and CableAce awards.

Ayres developed some material which was never produced, including a pilot for Marcy Carsey and Tom Werner, a pilot for Paul Witt & Tony Thomas, a screenplay for Richard Dreyfuss, John Avildsen and Mike Medavoy. He developed another original for David Field and Stephen Bach at United Artist; a long-form HBO script for Rick Rosenberg and Robert Christiansen on the life of Dorothy Parker.

In 1995 Ayres wrote a four-hour mini-series for NBC on the life of Elizabeth Taylor, which was released as Destiny. The producer, Lester Persky, radically changed the script during production and Ayres elected to use a pseudonym on the produced work.

== Personal ==
Ayres married at 21 to Anne Bartlett Ayres. They have two children and two grandchildren. His marriage ended in 1971 having in great part to do with Ayres’ growing acceptance of his preference for a gay life. He left Hollywood in 1971 to join a gay commune in the Sierras. He returned with a lover, Nick Kudla, and lived an openly gay lifestyle.

Gerald Ayres' second marriage took place in Watertown New York on September 4, 2013, to Guy Briscoe Ayres whose nom de guerre as an artist is Nicola Filippo.

== Filmography ==
=== Writer ===
==== Film ====
- 1981 Rich and Famous
- 1980 Foxes

==== Television ====
- 1995 Destiny (TV mini-series on the life of Elizabeth Taylor) written under the pseudonym of Burr Douglas
- 1992 Crazy in Love (TV movie) (teleplay)
- 1992 Stormy Weathers (TV movie) (teleplay)
- 1982 Rumpelstiltskin (1982) (teleplay)
- 1979 The Rockford Files, "The Return of the Black Shadow" aired 17 February 1979

=== Producer ===
- 1980 Foxes
- 1973 The Last Detail
- 1971 Cisco Pike

=== Actor ===
- 1973 The Last Detail - Skater at Ice Rink (uncredited)
- 2002 How to Draw a Bunny (documentary) Himself

== Awards ==
- Rich and Famous- 1980 Writer's Guild award Best Adapted Comedy of the Year
