= Auriol Lee =

British stage actress (1880-1941)

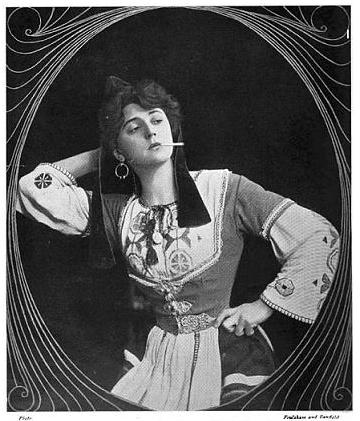
- The Bystander 1908
- Born: 13 December 1880; London, England
- Died: 2 July 1941 (aged 60); Hutchinson, Kansas, US
- Occupations: Stage actor, director, and producer
- Years active: 1900–1941
- Spouse: Frederick Lloyd (m. 1912; div. 1922)
- Parents: Robert James Lee (father); Katie Lee (mother)
- Relatives: Virginia Field (niece)

Auriol Lee (13 September 1880 – 2 July 1941) was a popular British stage actress who became a successful West End and Broadway theatrical producer and director.

== Biography ==
She was born in Maddox Street in the London district of St George's Hanover Square, the daughter of Katie and Robert James Lee. Auriol Lee's father was a medical doctor who, according to her New York Times obituary, was a distant relative of Robert E. Lee. Auriol was educated both in England and at schools in Europe, where she also received her training for the stage at La Monnaie in Brussels before making her London debut at around the age of twenty.

Auriol made her Broadway debut in November 1903 with the Forbes-Robertson Company in Kipling's The Light that Failed. The previous month, while her troupe was in Boston, she played a round of golf with Alec Campbell, the golf pro at a prestigious Country Club in Brookline. Campbell later told the press that he was forced to play his best game to compensate for the handicap he had allowed her.

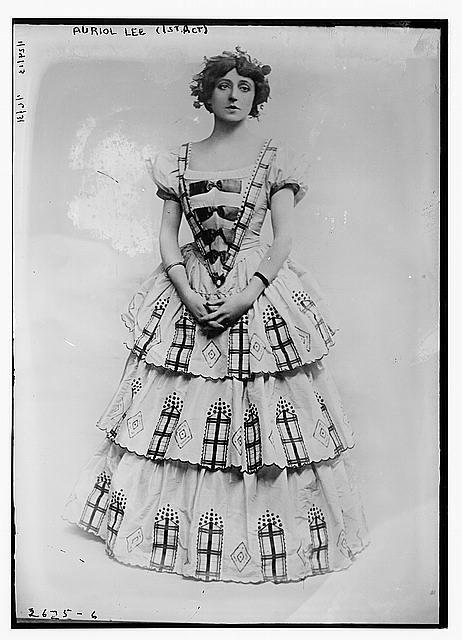
As Gertrude Rhead in Milestones by Edward Knoblock, circa 1913, Library of Congress

She remained active on Broadway as a performer until 1930 while dividing her time between America and Europe, appearing in a mix of classical and modern plays. Towards the end of the 1920s, Auriol began to transition away from acting to producing and directing plays.

Over the remainder of her career, she had a close working relationship with British playwright John Van Druten, directing all his Broadway productions that fell between 1931 and her death some ten years later. This included Sea Fever at the New Theatre in 1931. Their most successful collaborations over this time were There's Always Juliet (1932), The Distaff Side (1935), and Old Acquaintance (1940/41). The highlight of her career came with her staging the London production of Merton Hodge's The Wind and the Rain, which closed in 1935 after nearing a three-year run.

Auriol was married to British film actor Frederick Lloyd for ten years before divorcing in 1922. Around this time, she took an interest in aviation and became the first woman pilot to cross the Equator while flying over Africa. She was also once awarded a prize for flying 1,000 miles across the Mediterranean Sea.

== Death ==
Auriol Lee was killed in an automobile accident in or near Hutchinson, Kansas, on 2 July 1941. She was returning to New York from Hollywood where she had gone to play the writer Isobel Sedbusk in Alfred Hitchcock's film Suspicion and pay Van Druten a visit at his Southern California ranch.

She once reportedly told Van Druten that she wanted to be buried where she died, and as she wished, she was interred at Fairlawn Burial Park in Hutchinson.

At the time of Auriol's death, her only close relatives were a sister and a niece, actress Virginia Field.

== Filmography ==
Year	Title	Role	Notes
1938	A Royal Divorce	Napoleon's Mother	
1941	Suspicion	Isobel Sedbusk	(final film role)
