= Little Theatre in the Adelphi =

Demolished theatre in London

Coordinates: 51°30′33″N 0°7′23″W

- Interactive map of Little Theatre in the Adelphi
- Address: John Adam Street, Adelphi, Strand; City of Westminster, London; United Kingdom
- Type: West End theatre

Construction
- Opened: 1910
- Closed: 1941

The Little Theatre in the Adelphi was a 250-seat theatre in London, in a site to the south of the Strand. It was opened in 1910, damaged in a German air raid in the First World War and rebuilt in 1919–20. German bombs again hit the theatre in 1941 so severely damaging it that it remained empty until it was demolished in 1949.

The theatre was home to a wide variety of productions, from plays by Bernard Shaw and Laurence Housman presented by Gertrude Kingston, to Grand Guignol melodramas presented by Sybil Thorndike and Lewis Casson, revue, heavyweight drama staged by Nancy Price and her People's National Theatre company and Restoration comedy presented by Herbert Farjeon.

== History ==
=== 1910 to 1920 ===
Top: original auditorium, 1910 Middle: bombed interior, 1917 Bottom: restored foyer, 1920

The theatre was in a block, part of the original Adam Brothers' Adelphi development, between the Strand and the River Thames bounded by Adam Street, John Street (now John Adam Street) and Durham Street (now Durham House Street). The theatre was constructed in 1910 from a banking hall previously used by Coutts. The initial seating capacity was 250.

The first lessee of the Little Theatre was the actor-manager Gertrude Kingston, who had it equipped largely to her specification, the first British theatre to adopt lighting techniques, including "dimmer" lights, invented in the US. The theatrical newspaper The Era reported on the interior of the theatre:

Exquisite taste is shown in the decoration of Miss Gertrude Kingston's Little Theatre, in John Street, Adelphi. The lines are of classical simplicity, and the colours soft and restful to the eye. One passes through the "Adams" vestibule into a lovely little foyer ... The auditorium is of Wedgwood blue, with a couple of medallions in white on the walls, while the rich red of the curtain takes away any possible suggestion of chilliness. ... The stalls are square in shape and exceedingly comfortable ... Altogether the Little Theatre is a gem.

The prospectus for the new theatre announced:

It is the intention of the Manageress to cater for the playgoing public, particularly ladies, who require comfortable surroundings while enjoying a theatrical performance, and to this end there will not be any pit or gallery, the auditorium being entirely devoted to stalls and seven boxes.

Kingston had intended to open with Pains and Penalties, a new play by Laurence Housman, but the official censor declined to license its production because the theme – the divorce of George IV and Caroline of Brunswick – was uncomplimentary to the royal family. (Note: The censor later told Housman that if he removed the words "committed adultery" and "Heirs male of the last generation have not proved a conspicuous success" the piece could be licensed.) Instead, the theatre opened with Housman's translation in rhyming verse of Aristophanes' Lysistrata.

In January 1911 the child actor Noël Coward made his stage debut at the Little Theatre. The following month Kingston closed the theatre "owing to indisposition". Lillah McCarthy temporarily took over the management of the house in March 1911 and Bernard Shaw had his first commercial success there, with Fanny's First Play in April. Kingston returned to the theatre in April 1912 to play Arkadina in the first London production of The Seagull.

During 1912, "the lessees having found that accommodation for cheaper seats is desirable", the theatre closed in mid-year while the original boxes were demolished. The roof was raised and four new boxes and a balcony were added, the latter offering unreserved seats at half-a-crown (12½p). The theatre reopened under Kingston's management with a revival of Shaw's Captain Brassbound's Conversion on 15 October, with Kingston in the role – originally played by Ellen Terry – of Lady Cicely Waynefleet.

On 4 September 1917 a German bombing raid during the First World War so damaged the theatre that it remained empty until the end the war. The theatre was rebuilt in 1919–1920; the original plans were followed except that the boxes were dispensed with. New systems of stage lighting, heating and ventilation were installed. The theatre now had a seating capacity of 377.

=== 1920 to 1949 ===
Sybil Thorndike and Lewis Casson in Progress, part of their Grand Guignol series in 1922

The house reopened in February 1920, under the management of J. E. Vedrenne and Frank Vernon. The opening production was Edward Knoblock's war play Mumsie. Later in the year Sybil Thorndike, her brother, Russell and her husband Lewis Casson presented a two-year run of Grand Guignol melodramas at the Little Theatre. The theatre historians Mander and Mitchenson record:

London’s Grand Guignol became a success and in all eight series of plays were produced. Lighter plays were sometimes included and, in 1922, (the last programme), Noël Coward’s The Better Half, an early one act play, was included. But most of the plays were strong meat in those days and hospital nurses were kept posted in the theatre ready to attend to any members of the audience who might be overcome by the horrific happenings enacted on the stage!

The Little Theatre began presenting intimate revue in October 1922 when The Nine O’Clock Revue starring Beatrice Lillie and Morris Harvey was produced. It ran for 385 performances and was followed in October 1923 by The Little Revue Starts at Nine. It starred Jack Hulbert and Cicely Courtneidge and ran for 196 performances.

From 1932 to 1937 the house was the permanent home of the People's National Theatre under its manager Nancy Price. Among her presentations in 1932 were John Galsworthy's The Silver Box, Shaw's Getting Married, and an adaptation of Alice in Wonderland. Later productions included plays by John Masefield, Elmer Rice, Galsworthy, Shaw, Maurice Maeterlinck, Luigi Pirandello and Henrik Ibsen. Price's biggest box-office success was Hsiung Shih-I's Lady Precious Stream, which she staged four times, the longest revival running for 456 performances. Her other great success was a dramatisation by Mazo de la Roche of her own novel Whiteoaks, produced in April 1936, which ran for 827 performances. Price left the Little Theatre in 1937, and The Ascent of F6, described as "a tragedy in two acts", by W. H. Auden and Christopher Isherwood transferred from the Mercury Theatre, Notting Hill Gate.

The theatre was closed from June to December 1938, after which Herbert Farjeon took over the management and wrote Nine Sharp, a revue with music by Walter Leigh. The two followed this in 1939 with The Little Revue. Both revues ran for more than 400 performances. In April 1940 Farjeon opened what was intended to be a season of Restoration drama, with Alec Clunes, Hermione Baddeley, Max Adrian and Ursula Jeans in Miles Malleson's production of William Wycherley's The Country Wife.

On the night of 16 April 1941 the theatre was again wrecked by a German bomb, and remained derelict until 1949, when it was demolished, replaced by an office block.

== Notes, references and sources ==
=== Sources ===
- Gaye, Freda, ed. (1967). Who's Who in the Theatre (fourteenth ed.). London: Sir Isaac Pitman and Sons. OCLC 5997224.
- Holroyd, Michael (1997). Bernard Shaw: The One-Volume Definitive Edition. London: Chatto & Windus. ISBN 978-0-7011-6279-5.
- Housman, Laurence (1937). Pains and Penalties: The Defence of Queen Caroline. London: Jonathan Cape. OCLC 14012809.
- Lesley, Cole (1976). The Life of Noël Coward. London: Cape. ISBN 978-0-224-01288-1.
- Mander, Raymond; Joe Mitchenson (1976) [1968]. Lost Theatres of London (second ed.). London: New English Library. ISBN 978-0-450-02838-0.
- Morley, Sheridan (1986). The Great Stage Actors. London: Angus and Robertson. ISBN 978-0-207-14970-2.
