= John Van Druten =

English actor and playwright (1901–1957)

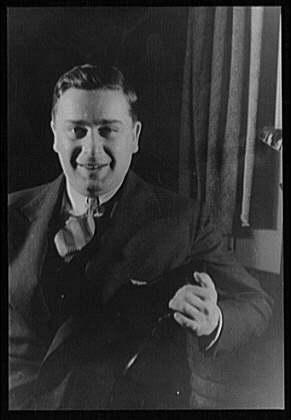
- Van Druten in 1932, photographed by Carl Van Vechten
- Born: John William Van Druten; 1 June 1901; London, England
- Died: 19 December 1957 (aged 56); Indio, California, U.S.
- Resting place: Coachella Valley Public Cemetery
- Occupations: Playwright; theatre director
- Years active: 1924–1952
- Parents: Wilhelmus van Druten (father); Eva (mother)

John William Van Druten (1 June 1901 – 19 December 1957) was an English playwright and theatre director. He began his career in London, and later moved to America, becoming a U.S. citizen. He was known for his plays of witty and urbane observations of contemporary life and society.

== Biography ==
Van Druten was born in London in 1901, son of a Dutch father named Wilhelmus van Druten and his English wife Eva. He was educated at University College School and read law at the University of London. Before commencing his career as a writer, he practised law for a while as a solicitor and university lecturer in Wales. His first play, The Return Half, was performed by members of the RADA Ex-Students' Club on October 5, 1924. John Gielgud played the leading character, a would-be poet whose businessman stepfather ships him off to Australia.

He came to prominence with Young Woodley, a slight but charming study of adolescence, produced in New York in 1925. However, it was banned in London by the Lord Chamberlain's office owing to its then-controversial portrayal of a schoolboy falling in love with his headmaster's wife. In Britain, it was first produced privately (by Phyllis Whitworth's Three Hundred Club) and then at the Arts Theatre in 1928. When the ban was lifted, it had a successful run at the Savoy Theatre in the West End with a cast including Frank Lawton, Derrick De Marney, and Jack Hawkins. The play was filmed twice. It was revived at the Finborough Theatre, London, in 2006.

Van Druten was one of the more successful playwrights of the early 1930s in London, with star-studded West End productions of his work, including Diversion (1927), After All (1929), London Wall (1931) with Frank Lawton and John Mills, There's Always Juliet (1931), Somebody Knows (1932), Behold, We Live (1932) with Gertrude Lawrence and Gerald du Maurier, The Distaff Side (1933), and Flowers of the Forest (1934).

He later emigrated to America, where he wrote Leave Her to Heaven (February 1940), a drama set in London and Westcliff-on-Sea in Essex, which was shortly followed by major successes with Old Acquaintance (NY December 1940 – May 1941 and London with Edith Evans) and The Voice of the Turtle (1943), which ran for three seasons in New York and was filmed with Ronald Reagan. His subsequent play, I Remember Mama (1944), ran for 713 performances. It was later made into a movie and a television series. In 1944, he became a naturalized citizen of the United States. His play Make Way for Lucia (1948), based on the Mapp and Lucia novels of E. F. Benson, was premiered in New York, but did not have its first professional British production until 1995.

His 1951 play I Am a Camera, together with Christopher Isherwood's short stories, Goodbye to Berlin (1939), formed the basis of Joe Masteroff's book for the Kander and Ebb musical Cabaret (1966). When I Am a Camera opened on Broadway in 1951, drama critic Walter Kerr gave the play a largely positive review in New York Herald Tribune. However, he was later erroneously attributed to have made a two-word review of "No Leica". This quip about the play was made by Goodman Ace and reported by gossip columnist Walter Winchell in his syndicated newspaper column.

On 26 April 1921, Van Druten married Paula Cinquevalli, daughter of the music hall artist Paul Cinquevalli. The marriage ended in divorce a few years later. In the late 1930s and early 1940s, he was in a relationship with Carter Lodge (died 1995), who was the manager of the AJC Ranch that Van Druten, British actress Auriol Lee and Lodge bought together in Coachella Valley. When the relationship ended, Lodge continued to live on the ranch with his new partner, Dick Foote. When Van Druten died in 1957, he left the entire property of the ranch to Lodge and the rights in his work, including "I Am a Camera", which entitled Lodge to earn a percentage from the movie Cabaret (1972).

He died at Indio, California on 19 December 1957 of undisclosed causes. He is buried in the Coachella Valley Public Cemetery.

== Association with Vedanta ==
John Van Druten's friend and colleague, Christopher Isherwood had fled Europe just before WWII broke out. Isherwood settled in the Los Angeles area and began a life-long association with his guru, Swami Prabhavananda. It was Isherwood who wrote The Berlin Stories, on which Van Druten based his play, I Am A Camera. Through Isherwood Van Druten became involved with the Vedanta Society of Southern California in Hollywood, which was founded in 1930 by Swami Prabhavananda.

From 1951 until his death in 1957, Van Druten was an Editorial Advisor, along with Gerald Heard, Aldous Huxley, and Christopher Isherwood, for the bi-monthly journal Vedanta and the West, published by the Vedanta Society of Southern California. During that time, the journal published 10 essays by Van Druten.

== Plays ==
- The Return Half (1924)
- Young Woodley (NY 1925, London 1928)
- Chance Acquaintance (1927)
- Diversion (1927)
- The Return of the Soldier (from Rebecca West's novel, 1928)
- After All (1929, NY 1931)
- London Wall (1931)
- Sea Fever (with Auriol Lee, from the French, 1931)
- There's Always Juliet (1931, NY 1932)
- Hollywood Holiday (with Benn W. Levy, 1931)
- Somebody Knows (1932)
- Behold, We Live (1932)
- The Distaff Side (1933, NY 1934)
- Flowers of the Forest (1934)
- Most of the Game (1935)
- Gertie Maude (1937)
- Leave Her to Heaven (1940)
- Old Acquaintance (1940, NY 1941 and London with Edith Evans)
- Solitaire (adaptation, 1942)
- The Damask Cheek (with Lloyd Morris, 1942)
- The Voice of the Turtle (1943), which ran for three seasons in New York
- I Remember Mama (adaptation of Kathryn Forbes' family memoir, Mama's Bank Account, 1944)
- The Mermaids Singing (1944)
- The Druid Circle (1947)
- Make Way for Lucia (1948)
- Bell, Book and Candle (1950; filmed in 1958 starring James Stewart and Kim Novak)
- I Am a Camera (1951) from Christopher Isherwood's Berlin Stories. New York Drama Critics' Circle Award for 1951–52
- I've Got Sixpence (1952)

== Other work ==
Van Druten directed the last nine productions of his own plays (see above).

At the St. James Theatre, New York in March 1951, he directed the first production of the musical The King and I (1,246 performances) with Gertrude Lawrence and Yul Brynner. He also restaged this production at the Theatre Royal Drury Lane, in London, October 1953 (946 performances).

At the Theatre Royal, Brighton in November 1954, he staged a production of The Duchess and the Smugs.

Van Druten wrote two autobiographies:

- The Way to the Present (1938)
- The Widening Circle: Personal Search, Charles Scribner's Sons, New York (1957)

He also published two novels: a version of Young Woodley (1928), and The Vicarious Years in 1955.

He also published a book on his work, Playwright at Work, just after the Second World War.

== Filmography ==
- The Careless Age, directed by John Griffith Wray (1929, based on the play Diversion)
- Young Woodley, directed by Thomas Bentley (1930, based on the play Young Woodley)
- New Morals for Old, directed by Charles Brabin (1932, based on the play After All)
- After Office Hours, directed by Thomas Bentley (1932, based on the play London Wall)
- If I Were Free, directed by Elliott Nugent (1933, based on the play Behold, We Live)
- One Night in Lisbon, directed by Edward H. Griffith (1941, based on the play There's Always Juliet)
- Old Acquaintance, directed by Vincent Sherman (1943, based on the play Old Acquaintance)
- The Voice of the Turtle, directed by Irving Rapper (1947, based on the play The Voice of the Turtle)
- I Remember Mama, directed by George Stevens (1948, based on the play I Remember Mama)
- I Am a Camera, directed by Henry Cornelius (1955, based on the play I Am a Camera)
- Bell, Book and Candle, directed by Richard Quine (1958, based on the play Bell, Book and Candle)
- Cabaret, directed by Bob Fosse (1972, based on the play I Am a Camera)
- Rich and Famous, directed by George Cukor (1981, based on the play Old Acquaintance)

=== Screenwriter ===
- Unfaithful, directed by John Cromwell (1931)
- Night Must Fall, directed by Richard Thorpe (1937)
- Parnell, directed by John M. Stahl (1937)
- Raffles, directed by Sam Wood (1939)
- Lucky Partners, directed by Lewis Milestone (1940)
- My Life with Caroline, directed by Lewis Milestone (1941)
- Johnny Come Lately, directed by William K. Howard (1943)
- Gaslight, directed by George Cukor (1944)

=== Articles published in Vedanta and the West ===
John Van Druten contributed articles to Vedanta and the West, the bi-monthly journal published by Vedanta Society of Southern California from March 1943 until March 1958. From January 1951 to January 1958, John Van Druten was the Editorial Advisor to the journal, together with Christopher Isherwood, Aldous Huxley, and Gerald Heard.

- I am Where I Have Always Been - March - April, 1943
- Maya and Mortal Mind - January - February, 1944
- Prayer - March - April, 1944
- A Letter - March - April, 1945
- One Element - July - August, 1950
- Vivekananda - January - February, 1952
- What Vedanta Means to Me - March - April, 1952
- Waste Its Sweetness - November - December, 1954
- Religion and the Drama - September - October, 1955
- The Final Unbandaging - March - April, 1958

== Sources ==
- Who's Who in the Theatre, Twelfth edition, ed John Parker, Pitman, London (1957)
- The Oxford Companion to the Theatre, ed Phyllis Hartnoll, Oxford (1985) ISBN 0-19-211546-4
- The Oxford Companion to American Theatre, ed Gerald Bordman, Oxford (1992) ISBN 0-19-507246-4
