= Most of the Game =

- Written by: John Van Druten
- Original language: English
- Genre: Comedy

Premiere
- Date premiered: 1935
- Place premiered: Cort Theatre

Most of the Game is a 1935 comedy play by the British writer John Van Druten. Much of the play is set in New York where a British writer and his aristocratic wife have fallen out of love with each other, and started new relationships with a teacher's daughter and a Hollywood actor respectively. Complications ensue when the press gets hold of the story.

The play's Broadway run was at the Cort Theatre. The cast included Dorothy Hyson and Robert Douglas.

== Bibliography ==
- Gerald Bordman. American Theatre: A Chronicle of Comedy and Drama, 1930-1969. Oxford University Press, 1996.
- Wearing, J.P. The London Stage 1930-1939: A Calendar of Productions, Performers, and Personnel. Rowman & Littlefield, 2014.
