= Old Acquaintance =

1943 film by Vincent Sherman

- Theatrical release poster
- Directed by: Vincent Sherman
- Screenplay by: John Van Druten; Lenore Coffee; Edmund Goulding (contributor)
- Based on: Old Acquaintance; 1940 play by John Van Druten
- Produced by: Henry Blanke
- Starring: Bette Davis; Miriam Hopkins
- Cinematography: Sol Polito
- Edited by: Terry O. Morse
- Music by: Franz Waxman
- Distributed by: Warner Bros. Pictures
- Release date: November 27, 1943
- Running time: 110 minutes
- Country: United States
- Language: English
- Budget: $1,070,000
- Box office: $2.7 million (US rentals) or $3,639,000

Old Acquaintance is a 1943 American drama film released by Warner Bros. Pictures It was directed by Vincent Sherman and produced by Henry Blanke with Jack L. Warner as executive producer. The screenplay by John Van Druten, Lenore Coffee and Edmund Goulding was based on Van Druten's 1940 play of the same title.

The film stars Bette Davis and Miriam Hopkins, and features Gig Young, John Loder, Dolores Moran, Roscoe Karns, and Anne Revere.

== Plot ==
In 1924, author Kit Marlowe returns to her hometown to speak and to visit her childhood friend Millie. Millie has married Preston Drake and is pregnant, and she has written a romance novel. Millie asks Kit to present her book to her publisher.

Eight years pass, and Millie has become a very successful writer, with a string of romance novels. This has made her arrogant and condescending, and the Drakes' marriage is slowly disintegrating. In an interview with a reporter, Preston is shown to feel secondary to his wife's success. In a private moment between Preston and Kit, he professes his love for her. Kit tells him she cannot reciprocate as she could not do that to Millie. They kiss goodbye and part.

Ten years pass, and World War Two is underway. Kit is on a radio show, and Preston, now a major in the Army, hears her. He calls the radio station to suggest they meet for a drink. They do, but Kit also has her much-younger beau, Rudd Kendall, and Preston's almost 18-year-old daughter, Deirdre, whom Preston has not seen in those ten years, join them. Preston tells Kit he is engaged, and Kit is happy for him. Preston and his daughter become reacquainted. The next morning, Rudd presses Kit to marry him, but she puts him off. Rudd, feeling rejected, then meets with Deirdre.

Millie treats Preston's return as a victory and sets the scene for reconciliation. Preston dashes her hopes by revealing his engagement and asks for joint custody of Deirdre. Preston incidentally discloses to Millie that he was once in love with Kit. Millie throws him out and does her best to poison Deirdre against Kit.

Kit, having decided to marry Rudd, finds out from him that he is now in love with Deirdre. Kit tracks down Deirdre and brings her to Rudd. Kit then returns home to find Millie, and they reconcile. Millie tells Kit about her new book, about the trials of two women friends, and Kit suggests that Millie title the book "Old Acquaintance".

== Cast ==
- Bette Davis as Kit Marlowe
- Miriam Hopkins as Millie Drake
- John Loder as Preston Drake
- Gig Young as Rudd Kendal
- Dolores Moran as Deirdre Drake
- Phillip Reed as Lucian Grant
- Roscoe Karns as Charlie Archer
- Anne Revere as Belle Carter
- Esther Dale as Harriet
- Frank Mayo as Army officer (uncredited)
- Jack Mower as Army officer (uncredited)
- Francine Rufo as Deirdre as a child (uncredited)

== Background ==
The John Van Druten play upon which the film is based premiered at the Morosco Theatre in New York City on December 23, 1940, running for 170 performances. The play was staged by Auriol Lee and designed by Richard Whorf, and it starred Jane Cowl, Peggy Wood and Kent Smith.

Bette Davis wanted Norma Shearer to take the role of Millie, but Shearer, who was semi-retired, declined to take the secondary role and second billing. Miriam Hopkins, who had starred in The Old Maid with Davis and had endured a difficult working relationship with her (Davis allegedly had an affair with Hopkins' husband Anatole Litvak), accepted the role.

== Music ==
The original music for the film was composed by Franz Waxman, who had just left MGM where he had been under contract since 1937. In 1948, Waxman made a concert arrangement of the score's main thematic material under the title Elegy for Strings and Harp(s) in memory of Leo B. Forbstein, head of the Warner Brothers music department, who died on March 16, 1948. Waxman conducted the world concert premiere of the piece at the Hollywood Bowl the same year.

== Reception ==
According to Warner Bros. records, the film earned $2,279,000 domestically and $1,360,000 in foreign markets.

Bosley Crowther, the main film critic for The New York Times, found the friendship between the two lead characters implausible. "As a consequence," he wrote, "we have the tedious spectacle in this overdressed, overstuffed film of a supposedly intelligent woman writer spending her life being loyal to a girlhood friend who mints a fortune with trashy fiction and is vain, selfish, jealous and false to her."

== Notes ==
- The film was remade in 1981 as Rich and Famous with Jacqueline Bisset and Candice Bergen.
- When Bette Davis wore a man's pajama top as a nightie in the film it caused a fashion revolution, with I. Magnin selling out of men's sleepwear the morning after the movie opened, and all of it to young women.
