= Leave Her to Heaven (play) =

1940 play by John Van Druten

- Written by: John Van Druten
- Original language: English
- Genre: Drama

Premiere
- Date premiered: 27 February 1940
- Place premiered: Longacre Theatre, New York City

Leave Her to Heaven is a 1940 play by the British writer John Van Druten. Actress Ruth Chatterton made her first appearance on Broadway in 15 years. She co-starred with Edmond O'Brien. It premiered at the Longacre Theatre on Broadway on 27 February 1940. Set in England, it was based on a true story about a woman who took her older husband's chauffeur as a lover, only for the younger man to kill her husband.

It is unrelated to the film of the same title, which is based on a 1944 novel by Ben Ames Williams.

== Bibliography ==
- Gerald Bordman. American Theatre: A Chronicle of Comedy and Drama, 1930-1969. Oxford University Press, 1996.
- Scott O'Brien. Ruth Chatterton, Actress, Aviator, Author. BearManor Media, 2013.
- Derek Sculthorpe. Edmond O'Brien: Everyman of Film Noir. McFarland, 2018.
