= The Distaff Side =

1933 play

- Original language: English
- Written by: John Van Druten
- Genre: comedy

Premiere
- Date: 14 February 1933
- Place: King's Theatre, Edinburgh

The Distaff Side is a 1933 comedy play by the British writer John Van Druten. It premiered at the King's Theatre, Edinburgh before beginning a 102-performance run at the Apollo Theatre in London between 5 September and 2 December 1933. It was produced by Gilbert Miller. The original cast included Sybil Thorndike, Martita Hunt, Clifford Evans, Edgar Norfolk and Viola Keats. Its New York run began in September 1934 and lasted for 177 performances at the Booth Theatre.

== Bibliography ==
- Wearing, J.P. The London Stage 1930-1939: A Calendar of Productions, Performers, and Personnel. Rowman & Littlefield, 2014.
