= List of Sam Levene performances =

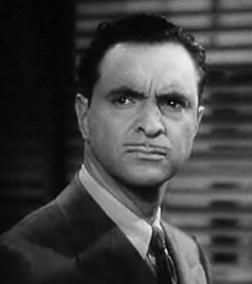
Sam Levene in Shadow of the Thin Man (1941)

Russian-American actor Sam Levene appeared in over 50 theatrical stage productions in the United States and abroad. A master of farce and comedy, Levene was equally effective in drama as well. Levene's Broadway credits include performances in 39 Broadway productions, 33 of which were performances Levene created in the original Broadway productions, and a 10-month USO tour. For 54 years, Sam Levene was a Broadway audience favorite playing cops, con men, theatrical types, businessmen, gamblers, hassled husbands, and even doctors.

Levene had 50 film credits. Levene worked with every major Hollywood studio over his five-decade Hollywood career; 14 of Levene's films were at MGM, which include two appearances as Police Lieutenant Abrams in the Thin Man series: After the Thin Man (1936) and Shadow of the Thin Man (1941), plus Yellow Jack (1938), The Shopworn Angel (1938), Married Bachelor (1941), Sunday Punch (1942), Grand Central Murder (1942), Whistling in Brooklyn (1943), I Dood It (1943), Shoe Shine Boy (1943 short), Dial 1119 1950, The Opposite Sex (1956), Designing Woman (1957) and The Champ (1979). Levene appeared in five RKO films, including The Mad Miss Manton (1938); Sing Your Worries Away (1942); The Big Street (1942) and A Likely Story (1947) and Crossfire, the first B picture to receive a best picture nomination. Levene appeared in six Universal Pictures films: Destination Unknown (1942), Gung Ho! (1943), The Killers (1946), Brute Force (1947), Slaughter on Tenth Avenue (1957), Kathy O'.

Other Hollywood actors who Levene worked with include Anthony Quinn: A Dream of Kings (1969); four films with Burt Lancaster: The Killers (1946), Brute Force, (1947), Three Sailors and a Girl (1953), Sweet Smell of Success (1957); Humphrey Bogart: Action in the North Atlantic (1943); two films with Henry Fonda: The Big Street (1942), The Mad Miss Manton (1938); Robert Ryan: Crossfire; Vincente Minnelli: Sing Your Worries Away (1942); two films with Myrna Loy & William Powell as Police Lt. Abrams: ‘’After the Thin Man’’ (1936), Shadow of the Thin Man (1941); Gregory Peck: Designing Woman (1957); two films with Red Skelton: Whistling in Brooklyn (1943), I Dood It (1943); Al Pacino: ...And Justice for All (1979); his final film role.

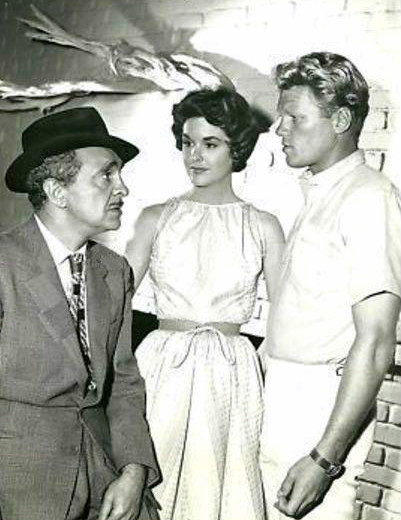
Sam Levene, Sue Randall and Jeremy Slate in The Aquanauts (1960)

== Film ==
Year	Film	Role	Notes
1929	The Talk of Hollywood	Film Buyer	uncredited
1936	Three Men on a Horse	Patsy	
1936	After the Thin Man	Police Lt. Abrams	
1938	Yellow Jack	Busch	
1938	The Shopworn Angel	"Leer"	
1938	The Mad Miss Manton	Lieutenant Brent	
1939	Golden Boy	Siggie	
1941	Married Bachelor	Cookie Farrar	
1941	Shadow of the Thin Man	Police Lt. Abrams	
1942	Sing Your Worries Away	Smiley Clark	
1942	Sunday Punch	Roscoe	
1942	Grand Central Murder	Inspector Gunther	
1942	The Big Street	Horsethief	
1942	Destination Unknown	Victor	
1943	Action in the North Atlantic	Abel "Chips" Abrams	
1943	I Dood It	Ed Jackson	
1943	Gung Ho!	Leo "Transport" Andreof	
1943	Shoe Shine Boy	Lucky	short
1943	Whistling in Brooklyn	Creeper	
1944	The Purple Heart	Lt. Wayne Greenbaum	
1945	The True Glory	Commentator	
1946	The Killers	Police Lt. Sam Lubinsky	
1947	Boomerang	Dave Woods	
1947	A Likely Story	Louie	
1947	Brute Force	Louie Miller	
1947	Crossfire	Samuels	
1947	Killer McCoy	Happy	
1948	The Babe Ruth Story	Phil Conrad	
1948	Leather Gloves	Bernie	
1950	Guilty Bystander	Capt. Tonetti	
1950	With These Hands	Alexander Brody	
1950	Dial 1119	Dr. John D. Faron	
1953	Three Sailors and a Girl	Joe Woods	
1956	The Opposite Sex	Mike Pearl	
1957	Designing Woman	Ned Hammerstein	
1957	Sweet Smell of Success	Frank D' Angelo	
1957	Slaughter on Tenth Avenue	Howard Rysdale	
1957	A Farewell to Arms	Swiss Sergeant	uncredited
1958	Kathy O'	Ben Melnick	
1959	The World of Sholom Aleichem	Mendele	TV movie
1963	Act One	Richard Maxwell	
1966	A Small Rebellion	Noel Greb	TV movie
1969	A Dream of Kings	Cicero	
1971	Such Good Friends	Uncle Eddie	
1976	Atlantic City Jackpot	Lou Maurice	
1976	God Told Me To	Everett Lukas	
1977	The Royal Family	Oscar Wolfe	TV movie
1979	The Champ	Uncle Eddie	uncredited
1979	Last Embrace	Sam Urdell	
1979	An Adventure for Two		
1979	...And Justice for All	Arnie	

== Television ==
Date	Program	Network	Title	Character
April 2, 1949	John Chapman Video Show	WPIX-TV	John Chapman interviews Sam Levene, Moss Hart	Himself
June 14, 1949	The Ford Theatre Hour	CBS	"Light Up the Sky"	Sidney Black
December 19, 1950	The Milton Berle Show	TV	Texaco Star Theatre, season 3 episode 14	Himself
January 27, 1952	The U.S. Royal Showcase	TV	season 1 episode 3	Himself
July 24, 1952	All Around the Town: Mike and Buff (Cobb) Wallace	CBS	"Backstage at Guys and Dolls"	Himself
November 9, 1952	Frontiers of Faith	NBC	"The World of Sholom Aleichem"	Sam Levene as Tevye, Aline MacMahon as Goldie, Joseph Wiseman as Reb Yosifel and Prefect
June 1, 1953	The Passing Show	BBC	"All Our Yesteryears"	Sam Levene as Nathan Detroit and Vivian Blaine as Miss Adelaide performing in Guys and Dolls
March 27, 1954	Medallion Theatre (Chrysler Medallion Theater)	CBS	"The Alibi Kid"	Sam Levene and Ben Gazzara
May 26, 1954	Douglas Fairbanks Presents Rheingold Theatre	TV	"Johnny Blue"; Season 2 Episode 26	Sam
June 22, 1954	The United States Steel Hour	ABC	"Fearful Decision"	Reporter McArdle
August 25, 1954		BBC	Excerpt from The Matchmaker	Horace Vandergelder
December 11, 1955	The Colgate Comedy Hour	TV	"Salute to George Abbott"	Himself
April 8. 1957	Studio One	CBS	"The Playwright and the Stars"	Ben Weber
June 10, 1957	Studio One	CBS	"The Mother Bit"	Ben Selig
September 11, 1957	Kraft Television Theatre	NBC	"The Old Ticket"	Lou Winkler
December 26, 1957	Tonight starring Jack Paar	NBC		Himself
March 9, 1958	Omnibus	NBC	"Mrs. McThing"	Eddie
November 25, 1958	Tonight starring Jack Paar	NBC		Himself
December 14, 1959	Play of the Week	PBS	"The World of Sholom Aleichem"	Mendele
August 21, 1960	The Ed Sullivan Show	CBS		Dramatic reading of "The Yom Kippur Scandal"
November 16, 1960	The Aquanauts	CBS	"Night Dive"	Lieutenant Maharis
November 17, 1960	The Witness	CBS	"Louis 'Lepke' Buchalter"	Louis Buchalter
November 22, 1960	The Wonderful World of Little Julius	CBS	Pilot	Agent
December 15, 1960	The Untouchables	ABC	"The Larry Fay Story"	Larry Fay
January 22, 1961	The Ed Sullivan Show	CBS		Dramatic reading of "How Tevya Became a Dairyman", a Sholom Aleichem story.
June 18, 1961	The Ed Sullivan Show	CBS	13th Anniversary Celebration	Himself
November 26, 1961	Macy's Thanksgiving Day Parade	NBC		Patsy
January 14, 1962	Directions	TV	"Sam Levene interviews Dore Schary"	Himself
February 27, 1962	The Tonight Show starring Johnny Carson	NBC		Himself
October 25, 1962	The Joe Franklin Show	WWOR-TV	Interview	Himself
November 5–9, 1962	Password	TV	Joan Fontaine vs Sam Levene; Five episodes	Himself
December 22, 1962	The Jerry Lester Show	WWOR-TV	Interview	Himself
April 14, 1963	The Jerry Lester Show	WWOR-TV	Interview	Himself
April 28, 1963	17th Tony Awards	WWOR-TV	Presenter	Himself
January 5, 1965	The Les Crane Show	ABC		Himself
January 11, 1965	The Les Crane Show	ABC		Himself
January 18, 1965	The Les Crane Show	ABC		Himself
February 8, 1965	The Les Crane Show	ABC		Himself
November 1, 1965	The Merv Griffin Show	NBC		Himself
November 1, 1965	Bob Hope Presents the Chrysler Theatre	NBC	"A Small Rebellion"	Noel Greb
October 30, 1969	What's My Line?	CBS		Himself
February 15, 1970	The Ed Sullivan Show	CBS		Dramatic reading
December 26, 1973	The Dick Cavett Show	ABC		Himself
December 28, 1973	What's My Line?	CBS		Himself
November 9, 1977	Great Performances	PBS	The Royal Family	Oscar Wolfe

== Radio ==
Date	Program	Network	Title	Character
3 May 1934	The Rudy Vallee Variety Show (radio series)	NBC Radio	Excerpt from Yellow Jack	Busch
17 February 1939	Orson Welles The Campbell Playhouse (radio series)	CBS Radio	Burlesque adapted from play by Arthur Hopkins & George Manker Watters	Lefty
24 March 1939	Orson Welles The Campbell Playhouse (radio series)	CBS Radio	Twentieth Century adapted by Charles Bruce Millholland	Owen O’Malley
25 February 1940	The Pursuit Of Happiness (radio series)	Columbia Broadcasting	Miriam Hopkins, Betty Hutton, Sam Levene guest star	Himself
25 May 1940	Lincoln Highway	NBC Radio	Three Thousand Miles to Glory	Himself
9 April 1941	Texaco Star Theatre with Fred Allen	CBS Radio	Shortcut to a Nervous Breakdown	Himself
21 July 1943	We Will Never Die	NBC Radio	Hollywood Bowl, Broadcast live	Himself
21 November 1943		CBS Radio	Algie and Gus	
24 December 1943	Christmas Roundup	CBS Radio	Romance in the Roaring Forties; Sam Levene narrates Damon Runyon story	Himself
28 February 1944	The Screen Guild Theatre	CBS Radio	Three Men on a Horse	Patsy
6 January 1946	Theatre Guild on the Air	ABC Radio	Three Men on a Horse	Patsy
13 January 1946	Eternal Light	NBC Radio	"The Parable of Reb Yisroel"	Himself
17 November 1946	Theatre Guild on the Air	ABC Radio	The Man Who Came to Dinner	Banjo
24 November 1946	Theatre Guild on the Air	ABC Radio	Burlesque adapted by Arthur Hopkins & George Manker Watters	Lefty
6 December 1946	Lest We Forget These Great Americans	Radio	Hey Cabbie, Institute for Democratic Education syndication	Cabby
8 December 1946	Theatre Guild on the Air	ABC Radio	Golden Boy	Moody
1 January 1947	Theatre Guild on the Air	ABC Radio	Three Men on a Horse	Patsy
10 August 1947	Reunion	Mutual Broadcasting System	Tribute American Academy of Dramatic Arts Director Charles Jehlinger	Himself
10 April 1958	Suspense Radio	CBS Radio	Crossfire	Samuels
27 March 1949	Theatre Guild on the Air	ABC Radio	June Moon	Maxie
25 September 1949	Theatre Guild on the Air	ABC Radio	The Gentle People	Jonah Goodman
17 December 1950	Theatre Guild on the Air	ABC Radio	Boomerang	Dave Woods
31 December 1950	The Big Show (NBC Radio)	NBC Radio	Variety Show hosted by Tallulah Bankhead	Himself
15 April 1951	Theatre Guild on the Air	ABC Radio	Light Up the Sky	Sidney Black
1952	The Human Heart Radio Series	Radio	Too Careful starring Sam Levene	Himself
20 December 1957	The Barry Gray Show	Radio	Interview	Himself
26 August 1960	Studs Terkel	WFMT Radio	Studs Terkel interviews Sam Levene & Monica May	Himself
1973	George Jessel	WEVD-AM	History of Show Business	Himself
