= Swing High, Swing Low (film) =

1937 film by Mitchell Leisen

- Theatrical release poster
- Directed by: Mitchell Leisen
- Screenplay by: Virginia Van Upp; Oscar Hammerstein II
- Based on: Burlesque; 1927 play by George Manker Watters and Arthur Hopkins
- Produced by: Arthur Hornblow Jr.
- Starring: Carole Lombard; Fred MacMurray; Charles Butterworth; Jean Dixon; Dorothy Lamour; Harvey Stephens
- Cinematography: Ted Tetzlaff
- Edited by: Eda Warren
- Music by: Phil Boutelje; Victor Young
- Production company: Paramount Pictures
- Distributed by: Paramount Pictures
- Release date: March 12, 1937
- Running time: 92 minutes
- Country: United States
- Languages: English; Spanish
- Budget: $739,600

Swing High, Swing Low is a 1937 American romantic comedy-drama film directed by Mitchell Leisen and starring Carole Lombard and Fred MacMurray.

It is the second of three film adaptations of the 1927 Broadway play Burlesque by George Manker Watters and Arthur Hopkins, after The Dance of Life (1929), and before When My Baby Smiles at Me (1948).

== Plot ==
Swing High, Swing Low (1937)

Working her way as a hairdresser on board a liner traveling through the Panama Canal Zone, Maggie King brushes off a brash young soldier, "Skid" Johnson, on his last day in the Army. However, he is persistent, and the next day she and her friend Ella reluctantly go on a double date with him and his piano player friend Harry in Balboa. In a nightclub, she expresses her distaste of trumpet music, whereupon he impresses her with his amazing prowess with the instrument. When a man, speaking only Spanish, tries to pick her up at the bar, he and Skid end up brawling, which lands Skid and Maggie in jail. As a result, Maggie misses her ship back to the States.

With no money left after helping pay the fine, she is forced to move in with Skid and Harry. She talks a skeptical Murphy (a woman) into hiring the unambitious Skid and her as a trumpet player and showgirl, respectively, at "Murphy's Cafe y Bar" by telling Murphy that they are married. She clashes with fellow showgirl Anita Alvarez, Skid's former girlfriend, but Anita soon leaves for a better job. Maggie and Skid eventually fall in love and marry.

Maggie prods the reluctant Skid into going to New York City to play in a major nightclub, leaving her behind. She finds out afterward that Anita works there. He is a big success, teamed with songstress Anita. Fame and fortune go to his head. He neglects to send Maggie the fare to join him and does not answer her letters. Finally, Maggie borrows the money from Murphy. Anita intercepts her telegram to Skid, telling him where to meet her boat. After waiting at the pier for a long time, Maggie calls Anita's hotel room on a hunch, and a drunk Skid answers (Anita invited him in for a nightcap after a night on the town together). Ella finds out and tells her old boyfriend, wealthy rancher Harvey Howell. Maggie plans to sail to France to obtain a divorce and marry Harvey.

Skid is so devastated, he starts drinking and missing performances, costing him his job and his career. Finally, he tries to reenlist, but fails the physical exam. Then, he runs into Harry, who has been searching for him. Harry has gotten a band together for a live radio performance to audition for an important sponsor, and (to help his old friend out) wants Skid to play with them. Skid's old agent Georgie tries to get Maggie, just returned from France, to pull Skid into shape. She rushes over and does her best. During the broadcast, Skid is terrible at first, but after Maggie tells him that she is sticking to him "til death do us part", he recaptures his old brilliance.

== Cast ==
- Carole Lombard as Maggie King
- Fred MacMurray as Skid Johnson
- Charles Butterworth as Harry
- Jean Dixon as Ella
- Dorothy Lamour as Anita Alvarez
- Harvey Stephens as Harvey Howell
- Cecil Cunningham as Murphy
- Charles Arnt as Georgie
- Franklin Pangborn as Henri
- Anthony Quinn as The Don
- Charles Judels as Tony

== Production credits (other) ==
- Boris Morros – musical direction
- Al Siegel – vocal supervision
- Farciot Edouart – special photographic effects
- Earl Haman – sound recording
- Don Johnson – sound recording
- Travis Banton – costume design
- A. E. Freudeman – interior decorations
- Ernst Fegté – art director

== Reception ==
Frank Nugent, critic for The New York Times, wrote "Swing High, Swing Low, like most Ferris wheels, doesn't go anywhere—at least, nowhere that you have not been. Its players really are worthy of better treatment."

== Releases ==
In 1965, the film entered the public domain in the United States because the claimants did not renew its copyright registration in the 28th year after publication.

Swing High, Swing Low was released on DVD (all regions) by Synergy Entertainment on May 15, 2007.
