= The Dance of Life (film) =

1929 American film

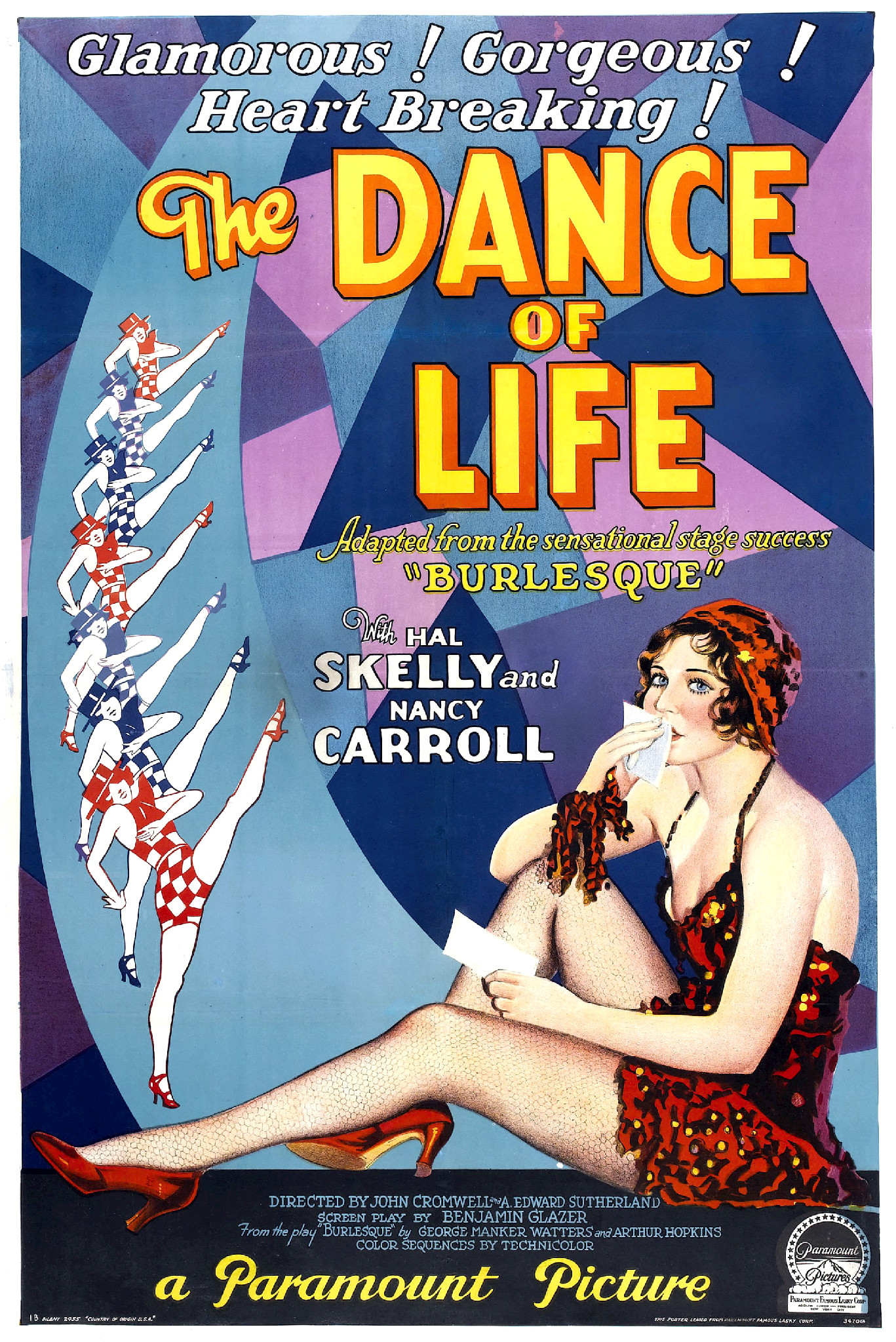
- Directed by: John Cromwell; A. Edward Sutherland
- Written by: Benjamin Glazer; Julian Johnson (titles)
- Based on: Burlesque (play) by George Manker Watters and Arthur Hopkins
- Starring: Hal Skelly; Nancy Carroll
- Cinematography: J. Roy Hunt
- Edited by: George Nichols Jr.
- Music by: Adolph Deutsch; Vernon Duke; John Leipold
- Production company: Paramount Famous Lasky Corporation
- Distributed by: Paramount Pictures
- Release dates: August 16, 1929 (New York City); September 7, 1929 (U.S.)
- Running time: 115 minutes
- Country: USA
- Language: English

The Dance of Life (full movie, public domain)

The Dance of Life is a 1929 American pre-Code musical film. It is the first of three film adaptations of the popular 1927 Broadway play Burlesque, with the others being Swing High, Swing Low (1937) and When My Baby Smiles at Me (1948). The film was directed by John Cromwell (who also appeared in the film with a small part) and A. Edward Sutherland. Hal Skelly appeared in the lead role as Ralph “Skid” Johnson after playing the same role in the Broadway version at the Plymouth Theater. He took part in the production for fifty two weeks before leaving his role to take part in the film. Charles D. Brown, Ralph Theodore and Oscar Levant also appeared in the Broadway production.

The Dance of Life was shot at Paramount's Astoria Studios in Astoria, Queens, and included Technicolor sequences, directed by John Cromwell and A. Edward Sutherland.

== Plot ==
Burlesque comic Ralph "Skid" Johnson, and specialty dancer Bonny Lee King, end up together on a cold, rainy night at a train station, after she fails an audition with a vaudeville company and he complains about her treatment by the impresario of the show and is fired. They decide to team up and apply for work with a much better show on "the big wheel" called the High Steppers Burlesque Company in Milwaukee, Wisconsin, run by Lefty Miller.

Miller hires the duo and the two fall in love. Later Skid asks her to marry him, but he gets drunk and ruins their wedding night. During this time a female comic, Sylvia Marco, who is attracted to Skid, tries to come between them. Skid is offered a solo part in the Ziegfeld Follies in New York and Bonnie encourages him to take it, but stays behind. Unbeknownst to Bonnie, Sylvia is also hired for the show. After his success on the big stage he neglects to send for her so after Lefty's show closes, Bonnie travels to New York to see him. She sends him a telegram letting him know she's coming to see him and to meet her backstage at the theater. After she arrives Skid has already left the theater, but she is told he may be at a speakeasy. She talks the doorkeeper into letting her in to see her husband but she finds him kissing Sylvia. Bonnie leaves him a note that says she will be filing for divorce which leaves him devastated.

The two are separated and Bonnie plans to marry Harvey Howell. Skid is still heartbroken over the break up and finds solace in alcohol, which is ruining his career. Lefty hires him for the lead role in his upcoming show provided Skid can stay sober, but Skid's drinking problem leaves him unable to perform, which puts the show in jeopardy. In order to save the show, Lefty sends for Bonnie to help Skid sober up so that he can perform and the two are reunited. But Skid passes out on stage on opening night which ruins the show. Bonnie joins him on stage the following night and Skid is able to perform.

== Cast ==
- Hal Skelly as "Skid" Johnson
- Nancy Carroll as Bonny King
- Dorothy Revier as Sylvia Marco
- Ralph Theodore as Harvey Howell
- Charles D. Brown as Lefty
- Al St. John as Bozo
- May Boley as Gussie
- Oscar Levant as Jerry
- John Cromwell as Speakeasy Doorkeeper

== Soundtrack ==
- "True Blue Lou"

Music by Richard A. Whiting
Lyrics by Sam Coslow and Leo Robin
Sung by Hal Skelly

- "The Flippity Flop"

Music by Richard A. Whiting
Lyrics by Sam Coslow and Leo Robin

- "King of Jazzmania"

Music by Richard A. Whiting
Lyrics by Sam Coslow and Leo Robin

- "Ladies of the Dance"

Music by Richard A. Whiting
Lyrics by Sam Coslow and Leo Robin

- "Cuddlesome Baby"

Music by Richard A. Whiting
Lyrics by Sam Coslow and Leo Robin

- "Mightiest Matador"

Music by Richard A. Whiting
Lyrics by Sam Coslow and Leo Robin

- "Sweet Rosie O'Grady"

Written by Maude Nugent

- "In the Gloaming"

Music by Annie Fortescue Harrison
Lyrics by Meta Orred

- "Sam, the Old Accordion Man"

Written by Walter Donaldson

- "Swanee River"

Written by Stephen Foster

== Copyright status ==
In 1957, the film entered the public domain (in the USA) because the claimants did not renew its copyright registration in the 28th year after publication.

== Preservation status ==
No color prints survive, only black-and-white prints made in the 1950s for TV broadcast.

== See also ==
- List of early color feature films
- List of early sound feature films (1926–1929)
