= George D. Watters =

George D. Watters may refer to:

- George D. Watters (1890–1943), the birth name of playwright George Manker Watters who also worked as a theatre manager under that name
- George Duncan Watters (born 1949), full name of sound editor George Watters II
