= When My Baby Smiles at Me (film) =

1948 film by Walter Lang

- Directed by: Walter Lang
- Written by: Lamar Trotti (screenplay); Elizabeth Reinhardt (adaptation)
- Based on: Burlesque, a 1927 play by Arthur Hopkins; George Manker Watters
- Produced by: George Jessel
- Starring: Betty Grable; Dan Dailey
- Cinematography: Harry Jackson
- Edited by: Barbara McLean
- Music by: Alfred Newman
- Distributed by: 20th Century Fox
- Release date: November 5, 1948 (San Francisco)
- Running time: 98 minutes
- Country: United States
- Language: English
- Box office: $3.4 million (US rentals)

When My Baby Smiles at Me is a 1948 American musical film directed by Walter Lang and starring Betty Grable and Dan Dailey. Released by 20th Century Fox, it is the third film based on the popular 1927 Broadway play Burlesque, the others being The Dance of Life (1929) and Swing High, Swing Low (1937). When My Baby Smiles at Me is the first (and to date, the only) full Technicolor film version of that play; The Dance of Life had several Technicolor sequences, but they are no longer extant.

Dan Dailey received an Academy Award nomination for Best Actor for his performance, but lost to Laurence Olivier for Hamlet.

== Plot ==
Bonny Kane and "Skid" Johnson are vaudeville performers in the 1920s. The two of them suffer marital difficulties when Skid gets an offer to appear on Broadway, while Bonny gets left behind on the road. Things get worse with Skid's increasing drinking problem, and the fact that the press has reported him to be spending a lot of time with his pretty co-star.

== Cast ==
- Betty Grable as Bonny Kane
- Dan Dailey as "Skid" Johnson
- Jack Oakie as Bozo Evans
- June Havoc as Gussie Evans
- Richard Arlen as Harvey Howell
- James Gleason as Lefty Moore

== Reception ==
When My Baby Smiles at Me was 20th Century Fox's highest-grossing film of 1948. Grable had been reigning the box office since the beginning of the 1940s, and scored her biggest triumph with Mother Wore Tights the previous year. It opened at the Fox Theatre in San Francisco and grossed $30,000 for the week. After four weeks it rose to number one at the US box office.

Dailey received an Academy Award nomination for his performance in this film, while Grable did not. In fact many thought she should have at least received an Oscar nomination for Mother Wore Tights.

== Adaptations ==
When My Baby Smiles at Me was presented on Screen Directors Playhouse May 5, 1950, with Grable reprising her role from the motion picture.

The film was parodied as "When My Baby Laughs at Me", on The Carol Burnett Show (1975 - Episode 8.18), with Carol Burnett as "Bunny" (Bonnie), Rock Hudson as "Skip" (Skid), and Vicki Lawrence as "Gussie".

It was also referenced in commercials for Peter Paul's No Jelly candy bar (1972).
