= Peggy Conklin =

American film, television and theatre actress

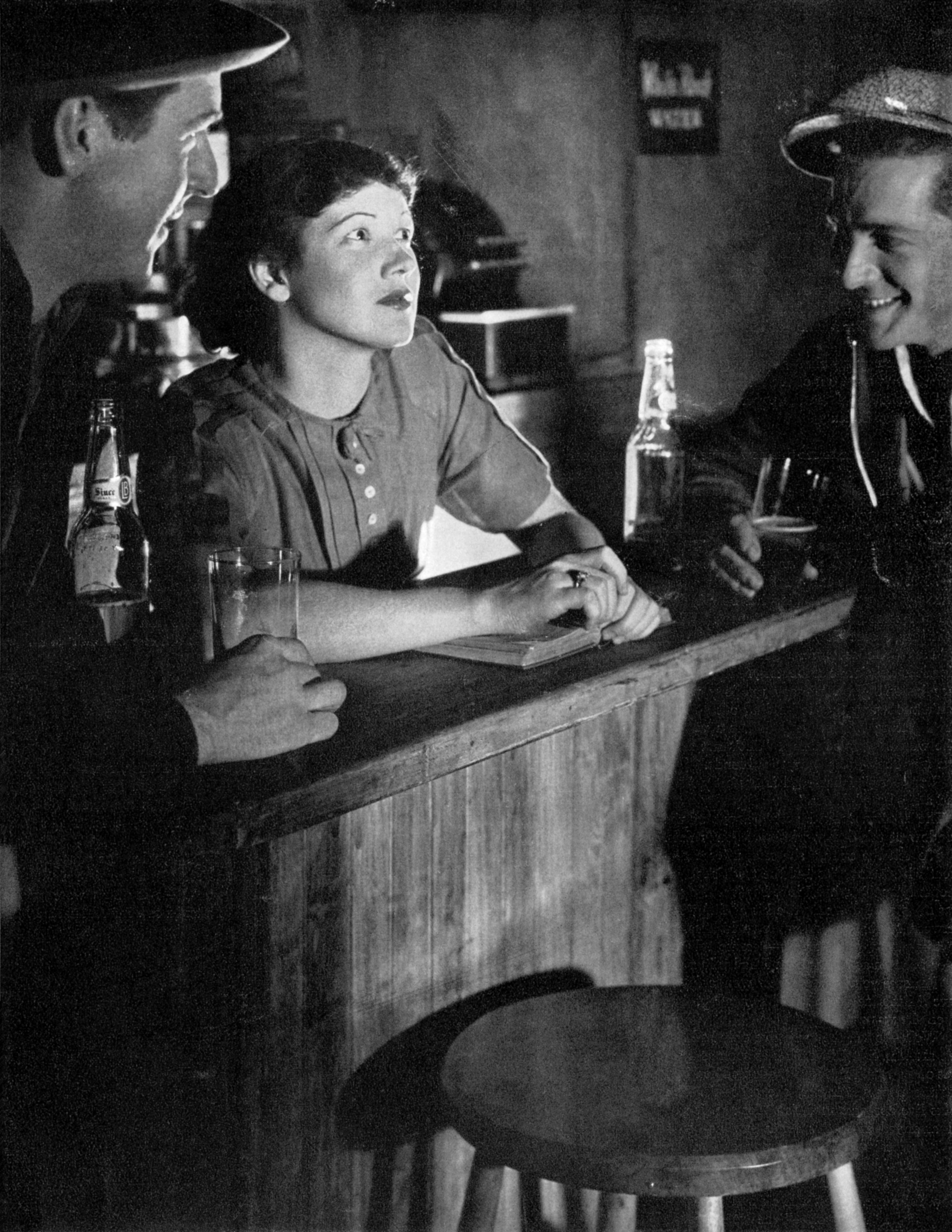
- Peggy Conklin in The Petrified Forest (1935)
- Born: Margaret Eleanor Conklin; November 2, 1906; Dobbs Ferry, New York, U.S.
- Died: March 18, 2003 (aged 96); Naples, Florida, U.S.
- Occupation(s): Film, television and theatre actress
- Years active: 1928–1960
- Spouse: James D. Thompson (m. 1935; died. 1998)
- Children: 2

Margaret Eleanor Conklin (November 2, 1906 – March 18, 2003) was an American film, television and theatre actress.

Conklin was born in Dobbs Ferry, New York. When she was twelve her mother died, and she was raised by her two aunts. After she graduated from high school she moved to New York City to become an actress, initially studying dancing.

Conklin began her acting career in 1928, appeared in the Broadway production Treasure Girl as part of the chorus line. She soon started playing leading roles, with her theater credits including Yes, My Darling Daughter, The Petrified Forest, Co-respondent Unknown, The Pursuit of Happiness, Miss Swan Expects, Mr. and Mrs. North, The Wisteria Tress, Old Man Murphy and The Ghost Writer. Her final theatre credit was from the Broadway play, titled, Howie, where she played the role of "Edith Simms". Conklin starred in the 1936 film Her Master's Voice alongside actor, Edward Everett Horton, and also in The President Vanishes and Having Wonderful Time, but only made five films in total. She also appeared on radio and television.

Conklin died in March 2003 at her home in Naples, Florida, at the age of 96.
