= The Sawdust Paradise =

1928 film by Luther Reed

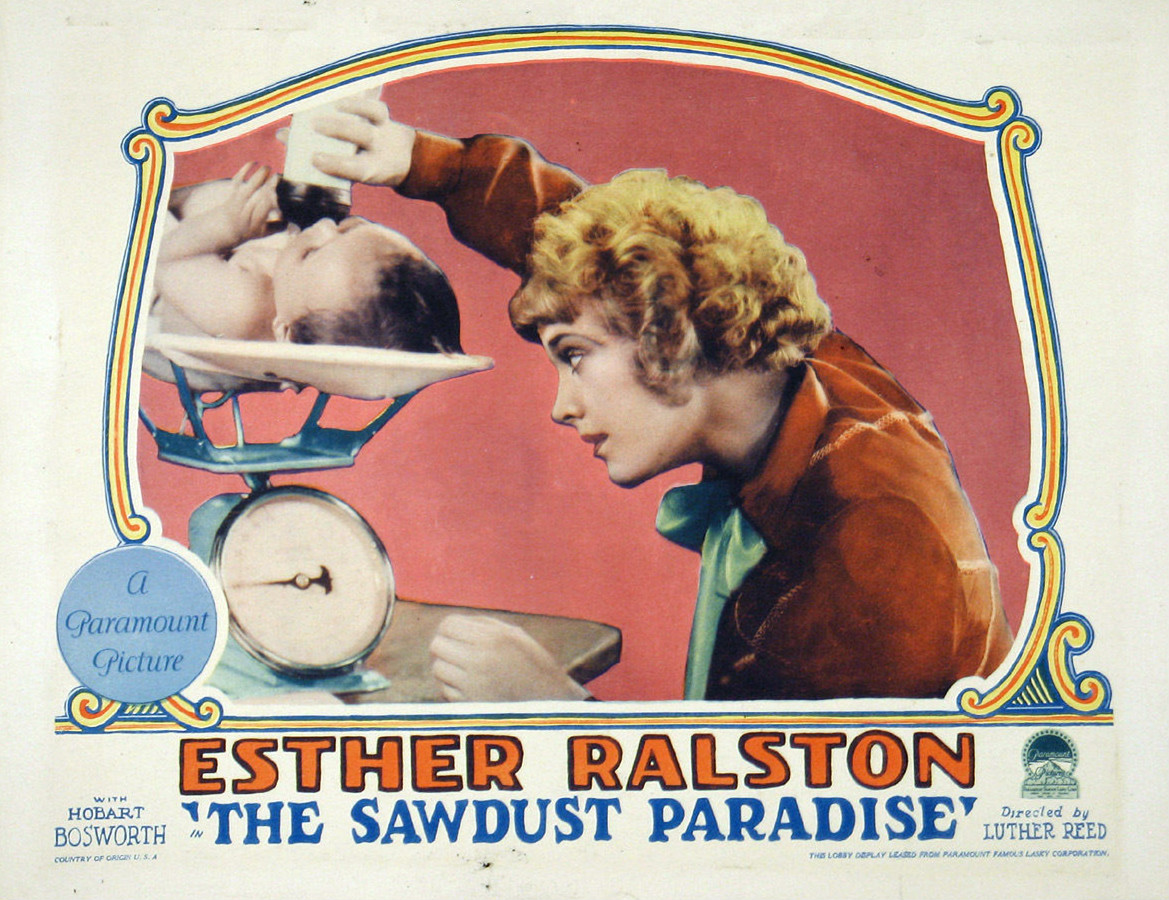
- Lobby card
- Directed by: Luther Reed
- Screenplay by: Julian Johnson; Louise Long; George Manker Watters
- Produced by: Jesse L. Lasky; Adolph Zukor
- Starring: Esther Ralston; Reed Howes; Hobart Bosworth; Tom Maguire; George B. French; Alan Roscoe; Mary Alden
- Cinematography: Harold Rosson
- Edited by: Otho Lovering
- Music by: Gerard Carbonara
- Production company: Paramount Pictures
- Distributed by: Paramount Pictures
- Release date: September 1, 1928
- Running time: 62 minutes; 7 reels
- Country: United States
- Languages: Sound (Synchronized); English intertitles)

The Sawdust Paradise is a 1928 American synchronized sound drama film directed by Luther Reed and written by Julian Johnson, Louise Long, and George Manker Watters. While the film has no audible dialog, it was released with a synchronized musical score with sound effects using the sound-on-film Western Electric Sound System process. The film stars Esther Ralston, Reed Howes, Hobart Bosworth, Tom Maguire, George B. French, Alan Roscoe, and Mary Alden. The film was released on September 1, 1928, by Paramount Pictures.

== Plot ==
Hallie (Esther Ralston), a spirited carnival worker, serves as barker, diving girl, and shill for a seedy street show where she's romantically involved with Butch (Reed Howes), a smooth-talking three-shell artist and grifter. When the carnival sets up in a conservative small town, it pitches its tents across from the revival meeting of traveling evangelist Isaiah (Hobart Bosworth).

One rainy night, townspeople seeking shelter drift into Isaiah's tent, followed by carnival folks. That night, Hallie is arrested on charges of crooked gambling at the carnival. In court, she feigns repentance, and Isaiah, moved by her apparent sincerity, intercedes on her behalf. The judge paroles her into Isaiah's custody for ninety days. The carnival is ordered out of town.

Under Isaiah's guidance, Hallie gradually grows to admire the old preacher's sincerity. She throws herself into the revival work with enthusiasm, using her carnival know-how to draw crowds. Speaking from the platform herself, she becomes instrumental in turning the revival meetings into a local sensation.

Meanwhile, Butch has acquired a new carnival of his own, hoping to build a better future for himself and Hallie. He opens the show in another town—coincidentally on the same night Isaiah's revival begins there. The original carnival owner, angry that Butch has set up competition, opens his own show nearby as well.

As Isaiah's revival begins drawing away Butch's audience, Butch grows resentful. Intent on “rescuing” Hallie, he barges into the revival to disrupt it, but hesitates when he sees Hallie struggling on stage, shaken by his presence. Unable to watch her fail, he sends his men through the crowd to shill for her, reviving the energy of the meeting.

While Butch and his gang are inside the tent, the rival carnival owner seizes the opportunity to attack. His gang torches Butch's new midway. Butch and his men rush to the scene, but the damage is done—the show is in ruins.

Hallie finds him at the smoldering wreckage and assures him he's not ruined but saved. She tells him that his old grifting ways would have ultimately led him nowhere.

Returning to the tabernacle, Hallie prepares to resume her revival work, but Isaiah, recognizing her deep love for Butch, urges her to follow her heart. Hallie rushes back to Butch, and the two embrace, ready to face an uncertain but honest future together.

== Cast ==
- Esther Ralston as Hallie
- Reed Howes as Butch
- Hobart Bosworth as Isaiah
- Tom Maguire as Danny
- George B. French as Tanner (credited as George French)
- Alan Roscoe as Ward
- Mary Alden as Mother
- J. W. Johnston as District Attorney (credited as J.W. Johnston)
- Frank Brownlee as Sheriff
- Helen Hunt as Organist
- Robert Wilber as Undetermined Secondary Role (uncredited)

== Music ==
The song “My Heart Belongs To You” by Lou Herscher was featured on the soundtrack and served as the theme song for the film.

== Censorship ==
When The Sawdust Paradise was released, many states and cities in the United States had censor boards that could require cuts or other eliminations before the film could be shown. The Kansas censor board ordered a cut of a scene with a close-up of a young woman's legs where a man is staring at them.

== Preservation ==
With no prints of The Sawdust Paradise located in any film archives, it is a lost film.

== See also ==
- List of early sound feature films (1926–1929)
