= The Petrified Forest (play) =

1934 play by Robert E. Sherwood

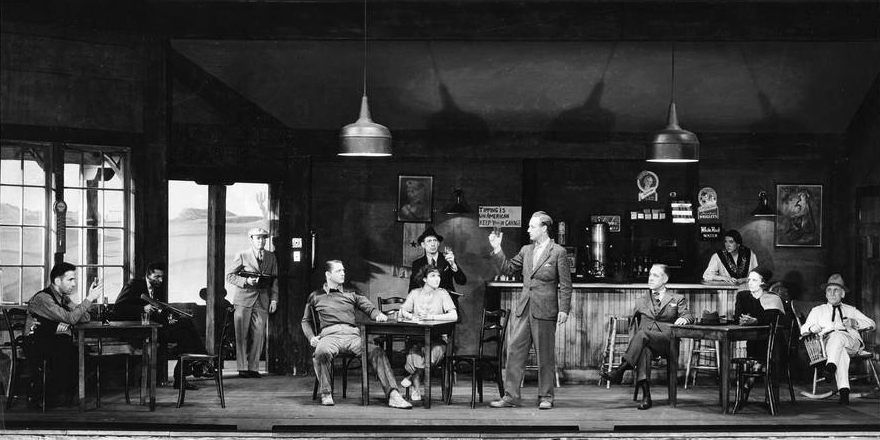
- Original language: English
- Written by: Robert E. Sherwood
- Subject: A writer muses on philosophy and life's futility at an isolated cafe
- Genre: Melodrama
- Setting: Cafe of filling station at deserted crossroads in eastern Arizona, one afternoon and evening in 1934

Premiere
- Date: January 7, 1935
- Place: Broadhurst Theatre
- Directed by: Arthur Hopkins

The Petrified Forest is a 1934 two-act play by American playwright Robert E. Sherwood. It is a melodrama, with a large cast and one setting. The story takes place inside a cafe called the Black Mesa Bar-B-Q and Filling Station, on a lonely crossroads in eastern Arizona. The family who runs it, their employees, and some customers are taken hostage by a criminal gang which has just pulled off a bloody jail break in Oklahoma City. The entirety of the action occurs in the course of one afternoon and evening in 1934. The title comes from the nearby petrified forest, where the drifting protagonist feels he belongs.

The original play was produced by Gilbert Miller and Leslie Howard, in association with Arthur Hopkins. It was staged by Hopkins, had sets by Raymond Sovey, and starred Leslie Howard, with Peggy Conklin and Humphrey Bogart. It ran on Broadway from January thru June 1935, with four of the original cast (Note: Leslie Howard, Humphrey Bogart, Slim Thompson, and John Alexander.) then reprising their roles in the 1936 film version. The play had one minor revival on Broadway in 1943, and was adapted for television in 1955.

This was the breakthrough role for Bogart, and thereafter he abandoned Broadway for the movies. The play was listed among the ten best of the season by critic Burns Mantle, but wasn't on the shortlist of four plays recommended for the Pulitzer Prize for Drama.

== Characters ==
Listed in order of appearance within their scope.
Leads

- Boze Hertzlinger is a young man, an ex-college football halfback, recently hired at the cafe.
- Gramp Maple is a garrulous old-timer who owns the business, but whose son Jason runs it.
- Gabrielle Maple called "Gabby", is Gramp's granddaughter who dreams of studying art in Paris.
- Alan Squier is 33, a drifter, a former writer from New England whose muse went silent.
- Duke Mantee is 35, a dangerous criminal on the lam with his gang, based on John Dillinger.

Supporting

- Telegraph Lineman called Nick, is a young man, thin and outspoken, an admirer of Russia.
- Jason Maple runs the Black Mesa Bar-B-Q, a Great War veteran whose French war bride left him.
- Mr. Chisholm is 45, a wealthy banker from Dayton, Ohio, fussy but with a dry wit.
- Mrs. Chisholm is 35, attractive, stylish, and blasé, whom her husband calls "Edith".
- Jackie is "a short, chubby, cherubic gangster. He carries a sub-machine-gun and wears a cheery smile". (Note: The playwright's description of this character, including Duke Mantee referring to him as "the kid" and "Jackie Cooper", suggests Dillinger associate Baby Face Nelson.)
- Pyles is the getaway driver for Duke's gang, a tall, slender black man.

Featured

- Another Lineman is young, husky and quiet and not so enthused about Russia.
- Paula is the Mexican cook at the Black Mesa Bar-B-Q who mainly just wails in fright.
- Herb is a ranch hand who tries to get betting tips from Boze and credit from Gabby.
- Joseph is the Chisholm's pious black chauffeur, short, crisply uniformed, wearing glasses.
- Ruby is a member of Duke's gang, thin, jumpy, and unhealthy looking.
- Legion Commander is a peppery little guy named Klepp who gets captured along with Jason.
- Hendy is another legionnaire, a slow burley fellow who also gets captured at the cafe.
- Sheriff leads the county manhunt; mentioned throughout, but only appears at the end.
- A Deputy is part of the local manhunt for Mantee's gang, appears at the end.
- Another Deputy is part of the local manhunt for Mantee's gang, appears at the end.

Voice only

- Radio Announcer is heard describing the two getaway cars of Duke's gang and other news.

Off stage

- Doris is Duke's girlfriend, who is in another getaway car with three other gang members.
- Dana Trimble is a local businessman who has offered to buy the Black Mesa Bar-B-Q.

== Synopsis ==
Act I The play opens inside the Black Mesa Bar-B-Q cafe, with two telegraph linemen eating lunch. Boze Hertzlinger sits with the linemen, while one of them discusses the advantages of Russian communism. Gramp Maple sits in his rocking chair, half-listening to the talk. When the word "pioneer" is used, Gramp perks up and the second lineman draws him into the conversation, hoping to divert it. A car horn is heard; Jason Maples enters and orders Boze outside to fill a customer's gas tank. Paula brings the linemen their dessert. When the linemen leave Jason scolds Gramp for boring the customers, and says he'll report them for being pinkos. Jason argues with Gramp about selling the business to Dana Trimble, so they can relocate to Los Angeles and open a garage. Gabby enters and agrees with Jason, but she wants to use some of the proceeds to live with her mother in France and study art. After Jason leaves for his American Legion meeting, Boze romances Gabby, is rebuffed at first but is making progress when Alan Squier enters.

Squier orders a meal; while eating, he and Gabby tell each other their stories. She is fascinated with his conversation. She shows him the book she is reading, poetry by François Villon, with which Squier is familiar. Squier asks where the road outside leads and is told about the petrified forest. He feels that maybe this is his destination. Gabby confesses her dream of painting in France; he counters by musing about French artists yearning to paint the Arizona desert. Herb enters the cafe to pick up some food and beer. He mentions to Boze the Duke Mantee gang seems to be heading their way. Gabby shows Squier some of her watercolor paintings, which he says are in the "Dufy manner". Squier confesses he can't pay for the meal; Boze is angry but Gabby shrugs it off.

The Chisholms now enter with Joseph, having arrived in their Duesenberg touring car. Joseph orders gas and oil, which Boze exits to fulfill. Gabby asks them to take Squier in their car to Phoenix. Mr. Chisholm reluctantly agrees, after Joseph searches Squier for weapons. They depart, and Boze now makes the big play for Gabby. Thinking Squier is out of her life, she agrees to go outside with Boze just to see what it's like. But before they can leave, Duke Mantee and his gang enter the cafe, having arrived in the Chisholm's hijacked Duesenberg. Jackie and Ruby carry tommy guns, with Jackie also carrying a sawed-off shotgun. Pyles stays outside in the Duesenberg, watching the road. When Duke takes off his suit coat he has two shoulder holsters with revolvers. The gang brings Gramp and Paula into the lunchroom. Paula is sent to the kitchen to cook food for the gang. Having been abandoned on the road, Squier returns to the cafe to get help, but is re-captured by the gang. Duke is gracious, allowing Squiers to have a drink. (Curtain)

Act II (Thirty minutes later) Boze and Squier sit at one table, Gramps and Paula at the other. Only Gabby is free to move around. Duke and Jackie are finishing eating, while Ruby watches the captives. Gramp regales the gangsters with his memories. Boze calls the gangsters yellow. Jackie scares Boze by having him stand up and move away from the others until Duke tells them both to sit down. From the radio they hear that one of the gang's cars with a woman in it has knocked over a police station in a small Texas town, seizing arms and ammo. Duke reacts to Jackie or Ruby mentioning Doris by saying shut up. Ruby is sent to relieve Pyles in the car, so he can come in and eat. Duke tells Paula to cook Pyles some hamburger and sends him along to the kitchen to keep an eye on her and find some rope. Pyles asks when they were going to get moving again; Duke replies when it's time. Jackie winks at Pyles and says the boss has got a heavy date. Pyles suggests getting out of range is more important than a dame.

Gramp asks Squier to pass the bottle over, which Gabby nixes. Jackie challenges Gramp when he reaches for his pipe, but Duke tells him to go ahead and smoke. Boze yells at Squier for drinking when can't pay for it, but Squier admits to having a dollar Gabby gave him. Stung, Boze replies that she was going to give him something else, causing Gabby to erupt with fury at Boze. He backs down immediately, begging her forgiveness. Gabby tells Squier about her near fall, who in turns consoles Boze. Jackie is amused and wishes Boze good luck. He goes into the kitchen with the map, leaving the shot gun on the table. Duke Mantee is affable with the philosophical musings of a slightly tipsy Squier, who suggests they both belong in the petrified forest along with the other obsolete detritus of civilization. Gabby in turn declares she's in love with Squier, but knows he doesn't reciprocate the feeling. She tells Boze that's why she was willing to go with him. Squier scolds Gramp for hanging onto his money when it might be better for him to die and let his granddaughter make use of it. This draws a stern rebuke from Duke for talking to an old man that way.

With Jackie and Pyles in the kitchen, Boze seizes the shotgun when Duke is distracted. Boze holds Duke at bay, but just then the Chisholms and Joseph enter. Mrs. Chisholm screams, and as Boze swerves the shotgun to cover them, Duke draws a revolver and wounds Boze. Jackie and Pyles burst in; Boze is taken into the kitchen for bandaging by Gabby and to be tied up by Jackie and Pyles. Squier now takes out his life insurance policy, and changes the beneficiary to Gabby. He asks the Chisholms to witness it, and hands it to Gramp for holding. Squier then asks Duke to kill him just before the gang leaves, but admonishes the Chisholms and Gramp to not let Gabby know it wasn't in cold-blood. Duke agrees, and when Pyles comes in they all have a drink. Pyles is ready to hand one to Gramp, but Duke stops him, saying the girl didn't want that. So Pyles hands it to Joseph instead, then gets irked when he looks to Mr. Chisholm for permission to drink it. Pyles again urges Duke to leave now, that Doris and the others must have got lost in the panhandle. Duke says she was the one to pick this rendezvous. Gramp calls Squier a fool, saying no woman was worth $5000. Squier refutes him by pointing out that Duke could have left already but is risking death waiting for Doris. When Gabby returns, Mrs Chisholm urges her to go to France and not sacrifice herself. Her self-confessions are interrupted by the arrival of Jason and two other legionnaires, escorted by Ruby and his tommy gun.

The three legionnaires are seated on the floor. Duke smirks at their "pansy uniforms" but is surprised to learn they were hunting the gang here. Hendy tells the gang that the cops caught the other car and the dame in it squealed, so the whole manhunt is shifting this way. Another car stops well short of the cafe; Sheriff and his deputies start flanking the cafe. Duke sends Jackie to cover the rear entrance and has Ruby get the Dusenberg ready. Pyles and Duke begin exchanging shots with the deputies in front. Duke has the three legionnaires, Joseph, and the Chisholms mount the running boards of the Dusenberg as human shields. He sends Pyles to fetch Jackie, but the latter is already dead, gunned down by the Sheriff. Duke sends Pyles to the Dusenberg, and upon Squier's insistence, shoots him just before he leaves, saying they'll be meeting again soon. The Sheriff and two deputies, guns drawn come in through the back entrance. Gabby has moved Squier to a chair at a table where he soon dies. Duke and his gang make their escape, letting their hostages go a mile down the road. Gabby recites Villon's poetry over Squier's body, as Gramp holds the insurance policy.(Curtain)

== Original production ==
=== Background ===
Robert E. Sherwood had written several historical plays in the years just prior to this effort. The Petrified Forest was a more contemporary work, based in America rather than Europe. Many reviewers noted that Sherwood drew inspiration for Duke Mantee from John Dillinger. The play's background of Duke Mantee being busted out of jail by his gang members and fleeing to Arizona had its parallels with Dillinger's exploits in October 1933 and January 1934.

Gilbert Miller announced in October 1934 that he would be producing Sherwood's play in association with Arthur Hopkins the director and Leslie Howard, who would also star. It was reported that rehearsals would begin when Howard arrived from England in mid-November, but by November 26, 1934, it was decided to proceed without him. He finally arrived at the end of November, but then had to immediately fly to Hollywood for film conferences at Warner Brothers. Not until December 7, 1934, could he join the rehearsals, a delay which meant the original tryout slot in Washington D.C. was lost. This forced the New York premiere to be scheduled for January 7, 1935, which meant The Petrified Forest would open the same day as The Old Maid.

=== Cast ===
Cast for the tryouts in Hartford and Boston, and during the original Broadway run. The show was on hiatus for a week in late May 1935 due to Leslie Howard's illness.

Role	Actor	Dates	Notes and sources
Boze Hertzlinger	Frank Milan	Dec 20, 1934 - Jun 29, 1935	
Gramp Maple	Charles Dow Clark	Dec 20, 1934 - Jun 29, 1935	
Gabby Maple	Peggy Conklin	Dec 20, 1934 - Jun 29, 1935	
Alan Squier	Leslie Howard	Dec 20, 1934 - Jun 29, 1935	
Duke Mantee	Humphrey Bogart	Dec 20, 1934 - Jun 29, 1935	After 10 years of Ivy-league roles on Broadway he stunned critics as a gangster.
Telegraph Lineman	Milo Boulton	Dec 20, 1934 - Jun 29, 1935	
Jason Maple	Walter Vonnegut	Dec 20, 1934 - Jun 29, 1935	
Mr. Chisholm	Robert Hudson	Dec 20, 1934 - Jun 29, 1935	
Mrs. Chisholm	Blanche Sweet	Dec 20, 1934 - Jun 29, 1935	
Jackie	Ross Hertz	Dec 20, 1934 - Jun 29, 1935	
Pyles	Slim Thompson	Dec 20, 1934 - Jun 29, 1935	James "Slim" Thompson reprised his role in the 1936 film and the 1943 Broadway revival.
Another Lineman	James Doody	Dec 20, 1934 - Jun 29, 1935	
Paula	Esther Leeming	Dec 20, 1934 - Jun 29, 1935	
Herb	Robert Porterfield	Dec 20, 1934 - Jun 29, 1935	
Joseph	John Alexander	Dec 20, 1934 - Jun 29, 1935	He and Slim Thompson were Harlem nightclub comics before doing the play and film.
Ruby	Tom Fadden	Dec 20, 1934 - Jun 29, 1935	
Commander Klepp	Aloysius Cunningham	Dec 20, 1934 - Jun 29, 1935	
Hendy (Legion)	Guy Conradi	Dec 20, 1934 - Jun 29, 1935	
Sheriff	Frank Tweddell	Dec 20, 1934 - Jun 29, 1935	
Deputy	Eugene Keith	Dec 20, 1934 - Jun 29, 1935	
Another Deputy	Harry Sherwin	Dec 20, 1934 - Jun 29, 1935	

=== Tryouts ===
The play's first performance was on December 20, 1934, at Parsons Theatre in Hartford, Connecticut. The local reviewer called it "the first Dillinger play" and said the playwright has "given the stage the first real killer, not the gun-flourishing desperado, but the grim man we at least popularly conceive as Dillinger". The five leads were all praised individually for their acting, while the rest of the cast was collectively saluted. The reviewer did have two suggestions for improvement: "less autobiographical confession" in the second act, and "less lugging in of the Legion by the heels".

After four performances in Hartford, the production went to the Shubert Theatre in Boston, where it opened on Christmas Eve 1934. The local reviewer said "The Petrified Forest is a most unusual mingling of blistering satire, heartfelt reference to poetry and philosophy, and thrilling but plausible melodrama." They praised the acting of Leslie Howard and Peggy Conklin and noted the audience's enthusiastic reaction to the play.

=== Premiere and reception ===
The Petrified Forest had its Broadway premiere on January 7, 1935, at the Broadhurst Theatre. Leslie Howard had top billing and was the only performer named in advertising. Critic Rowland Field echoed the Boston reviewer, saying "The play is a curious mixture of philosophic thought and exciting action". Arthur Pollock said the play's title reflected its theme, to wit that a petrified forest "would be a better place than most as a happy hunting ground for pathetically large numbers of maladjusted people of today, particularly the intellectuals. For our mechanical civilization, in its hurried rush ahead, has outdistanced our intelligence." Pollock points this up further by identifying what it is about Gabby and Duke Mantee that appeals to Alan Squier, that they are both untamed individuals not yet overcome by a "petrifying civilization".

Brooks Atkinson of The New York Times was enthusiastic about The Petrified Forest, calling it "a peach" twice in his review. He praised Leslie Howard, saying "If a modern writer must die for love of a new-found maid, let Mr. Howard do it just before the curtain comes down". He also liked the performance of Peggy Conklin as "a gas-station dryad", and said "Humphrey Bogart does the best work of his career as a motorized guerrilla". Like other critics, Atkinson speculated the American Legion was not going to like Sherwood's satire. For Burns Mantle of the New York Daily News, Leslie Howard's acting made The Petrified Forest a "most exciting philosophical melodrama". He spent his entire review in homage to Howard's talent, and only in the final paragraph acknowledged "splendid support from Peggy Conklin as the waitress, Humphrey Bogart, of all people, as the gangster".

=== Closing ===
The play closed on June 29, 1935, at the Broadhurst Theatre, after 193 performances.

== Revival ==
The Petrified Forest returned to Broadway on November 1, 1943, for a limited engagement of one week at the New Amsterdam Roof Theatre. The revival was produced by Mary Elizabeth Sherwood, a 22-year-old from Whittier, California, who had started up the stock company at that theatre. The play starred Wendell K. Phillips as Alan Squier, John McQuade as Duke Mantee, Barbara Joyce as Gabby Maple, and E. G. Marshall as Gramp Maple. Also in the cast was Slim Thompson, who performed the role of Pyles he had played both in the original stage production and the 1936 film. Reviewer Arthur Pollock, who had covered the original production, said of the play after seeing the revival, that it had once seemed so important.

== Adaptations ==
=== Film ===
Warner Brothers released a film version in February 1936, just 13 months after the play's premiere, with a screenplay by Delmer Daves and Charles Kenyon. Leslie Howard and Humphrey Bogart reprised their roles, with Bette Davis playing Gabby Maple.

=== Television ===
The play was adapted for television on a 90-minute live color anthology series called Producers' Showcase, airing on May 30, 1955. Humphrey Bogart again played Duke Mantee, while Henry Fonda portrayed Alan Squier and Lauren Bacall played Gabby Maple. Critic Jack Gould said the 90-minute air time gave "the dimension-in-depth of a Broadway play, not a hurried TV narrative", but he also felt the full effect of Bogart's performance as Mantee required him to always be visible to the audience, something possible on a stage but not with TV cameras.

== Legacy ==
The opening scenes of Richard Yates' 1961 novel Revolutionary Road (and its 2008 film adaptation) focus on an incompetent community theater production of The Petrified Forest.
