= The Petrified Forest =

1936 film by Archie Mayo

- Theatrical release poster
- Directed by: Archie Mayo
- Screenplay by: Charles Kenyon; Delmer Daves
- Based on: The Petrified Forest; 1934 play by Robert E. Sherwood
- Produced by: Hal B. Wallis (executive producer, uncredited)
- Starring: Leslie Howard; Bette Davis; Humphrey Bogart; Genevieve Tobin; Dick Foran
- Cinematography: Sol Polito
- Edited by: Owen Marks
- Music by: Bernhard Kaun
- Production company: Warner Bros. Pictures
- Distributed by: Warner Bros. Pictures
- Release date: February 8, 1936 (United States)
- Running time: 82 minutes
- Language: English

The Petrified Forest is a 1936 American crime tragedy film directed by Archie Mayo and based on Robert E. Sherwood's 1934 drama of the same name. The motion picture stars Leslie Howard, Bette Davis and Humphrey Bogart. The screenplay was written by Delmer Daves and Charles Kenyon, and adaptations were later performed on radio and television. The film is set in Petrified Forest National Park in Arizona. According to Variety, Warner Bros. Pictures filmed two endings. Howard's character dies in one and survives in the other. In May 1945, Warner Bros. released another film based on Sherwood's play, Escape in the Desert. It pits a Dutch flyer walking across the country to San Francisco and others against a group of escaped Nazi POWs.

== Plot ==
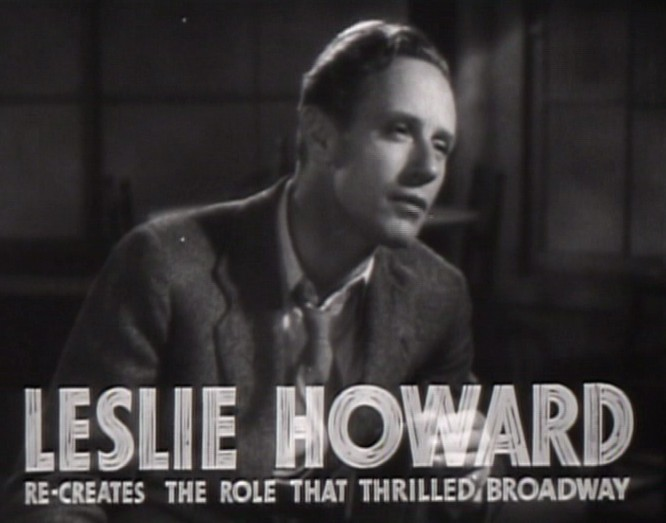
Howard as Alan Squier

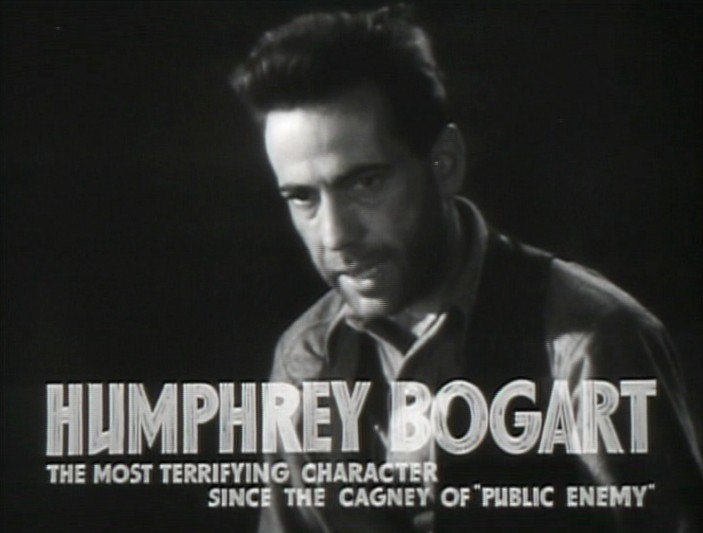
Bogart as Duke Mantee

In the midst of the Great Depression, Alan Squier, a failed British writer, now a disillusioned, penniless drifter, wanders into a roadside diner in the remote town of Black Mesa, Arizona, at the edge of the Petrified Forest. The diner is run by Jason Maple, his daughter Gabrielle, and Gramp, Jason's father, who regales anyone who will listen with stories of his adventures in the Old West with such characters as Billy the Kid.

Gabrielle's mother, a French war bride who fell in love with Jason when he was a young, handsome American serviceman, left her "dull defeated man" after World War I and moved back to France when Gabrielle was a baby. She now sends poetry to Gabrielle, who dreams of moving to Bourges, where her parents first met, to become an artist. Alan tells his story—how he wrote one novel, then lived in France for eight years with his publisher's wife, trying to write another—and Gabrielle is instantly smitten with him.

Gabrielle shows Alan her paintings—the first time she has shown them to anyone—and reads him a favorite François Villon poem. Boze Hertzlinger, a beefy diner employee who has wooed Gabrielle in vain, grows jealous of Alan, who decides to leave forthwith. He mooches a ride from wealthy tourists Mr. and Mrs. Chisholm; but after only a few minutes on the road they encounter Duke Mantee, a notorious gangster fleeing a massive police pursuit, whose car has broken down. Duke and his gang seize the Chisholms' car and drive to the diner, where Duke has arranged to rendezvous with his girlfriend, Doris, on their way to Mexico. Alan, the Chisholms, and their chauffeur soon make their way back to the diner as well.

Alan, indifferent to the hostage situation, engages Duke in lively conversation and toasts him as "the last great apostle of rugged individualism." Boze snatches a rifle and gets the drop on Duke, but during a momentary distraction Duke draws his pistol and shoots Boze in the hand, regaining control. Duke learns that Doris has been captured, and has revealed their rendezvous location to the police. As police and federal agents converge on the diner, Duke prepares to flee, announcing that he will take Mr. and Mrs. Chisholm with him.

Inspired by Boze's act of courage, Alan responds to an impulse: While Gabrielle is in the back room bandaging Boze's hand, he produces a life insurance policy from his bag and amends it, making Gabrielle the beneficiary. Then he asks Duke to kill him ("It couldn't make any difference to you, Duke ... they can hang you only once ..."), so that Gabrielle can use the insurance money to realize her dream of moving to France. Duke obliges, after Alan blocks him from leaving with his human shields; then Duke leaves, only to be caught by the police. Alan dies in Gabrielle's arms, secure in the knowledge that she, unlike the rest, will escape her dead-end existence to pursue her dreams.

== Cast ==
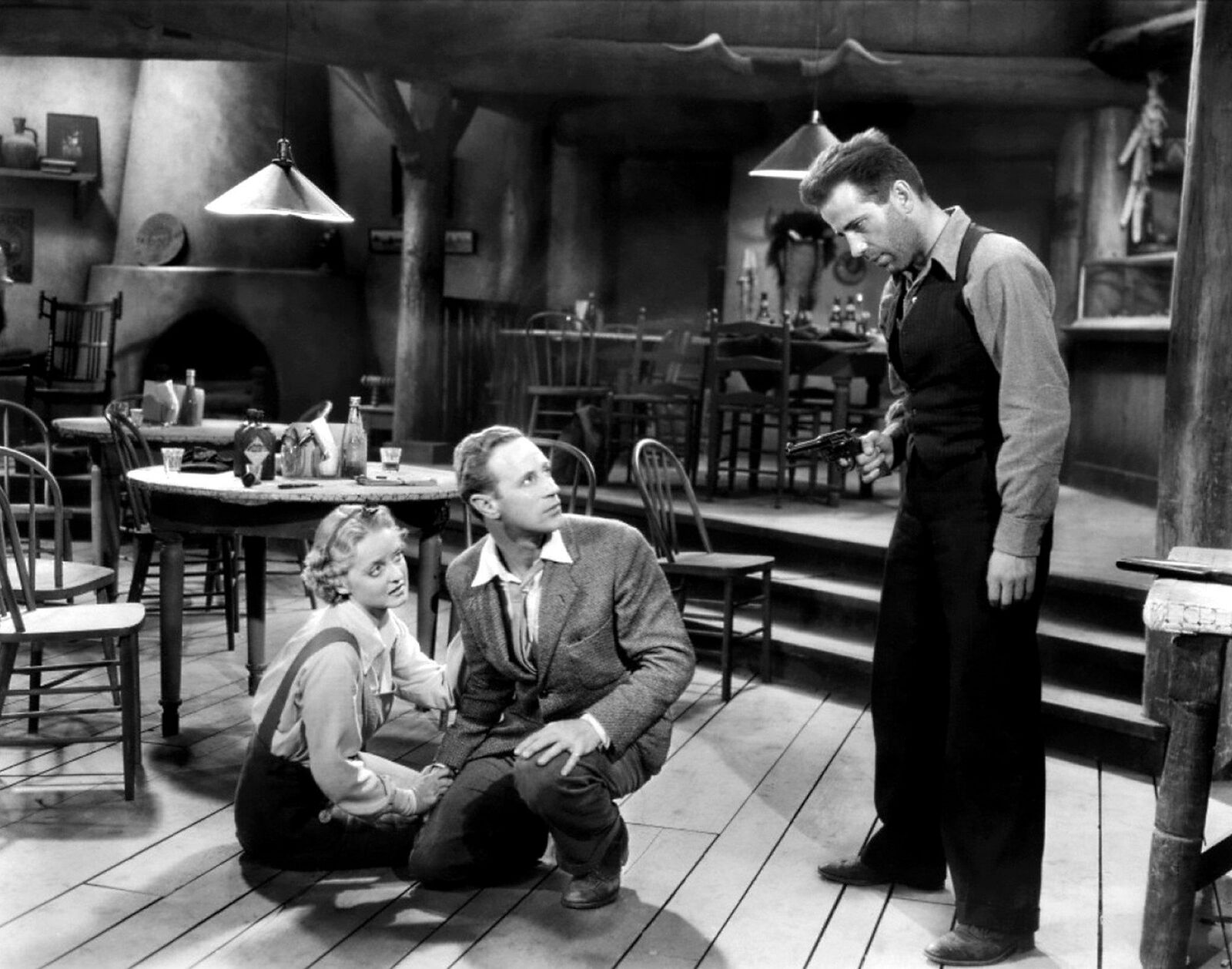
Bette Davis, Leslie Howard and Humphrey Bogart

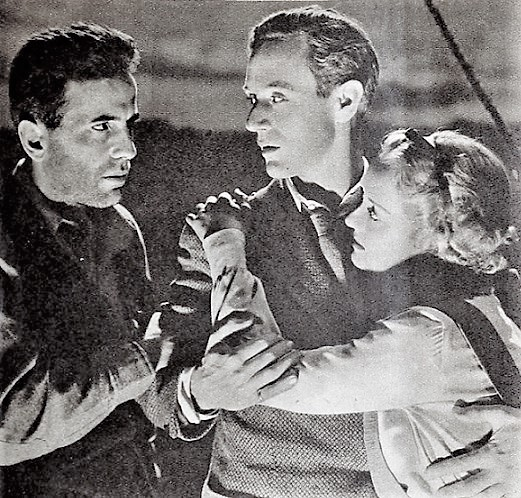
Bogart, Howard and Davis

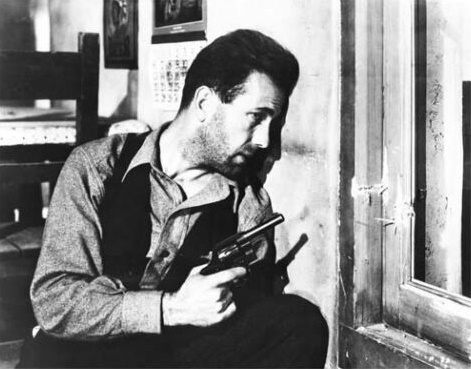
Bogart as Duke Mantee

- Leslie Howard as Alan Squier
- Bette Davis as Gabrielle Maple
- Humphrey Bogart as Duke Mantee
- Genevieve Tobin as Mrs. Chisholm
- Dick Foran as Boze Hertzlinger
- Joseph Sawyer as Jackie
- Porter Hall as Jason Maple
- Charley Grapewin as Gramp Maple
- Paul Harvey as Mr. Chisholm
- Adrian Morris as Ruby
- Slim Thompson as Slim
- Eddie Acuff as First Lineman
- Francis J. Scheid as Second Lineman
- John Alexander as Joseph, the chauffeur
- Nina Campana as Paula, the cook
- Arthur Aylesworth as Commander (uncredited)
- Jim Farley as Sheriff (uncredited)
- Gus Leonard as Jim, the Mailman (uncredited)

== History ==
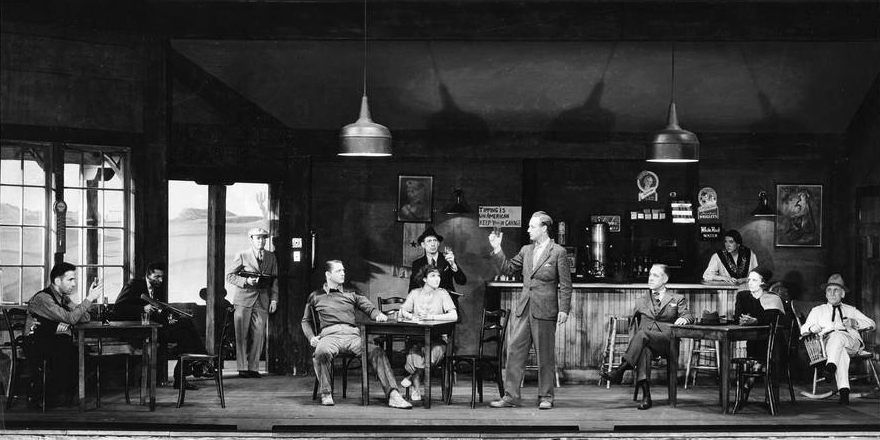
Humphrey Bogart (left) and Leslie Howard (standing center) in the 1935 Broadway stage production of The Petrified Forest, directed by Arthur Hopkins

The 1935 Broadway production of The Petrified Forest starred Howard, an established star, and Bogart, an actor in his first leading theatrical role. Sherwood based the Duke Mantee character on John Dillinger, the notorious criminal who in 1933 was named by J. Edgar Hoover as the FBI's first "Public Enemy #1". In 1934, Dillinger was ambushed and gunned down in spectacular fashion by FBI agents. Bogart, who won the stage role in part because of his physical resemblance to Dillinger, studied film footage of the gangster and mimicked some of his mannerisms in his portrayal.

For the film, Warner Bros. Pictures intended to cast the more bankable Edward G. Robinson as Duke; but Howard, whose contract gave him final script control, informed the studio that he would not appear in the movie version without Bogart as his co-star. The film made Bogart a star, and he remained grateful to Howard for the rest of his life. In 1952, Bogart and Lauren Bacall named their daughter Leslie Howard Bogart in honor of Howard, who had been killed when the German air force shot down his BOAC Flight 777 from Lisbon to Bristol during World War II.

In 1948, Robinson portrayed a character very similar to Duke Mantee—a gangster holding a disparate group of people hostage in a Florida hotel—in Key Largo. That film's hero was played by Bogart. In his penultimate film, The Desperate Hours (1955), Bogart played another gangster holding a suburban family hostage. He described that character as "Duke Mantee grown up."

== Radio and television adaptations ==
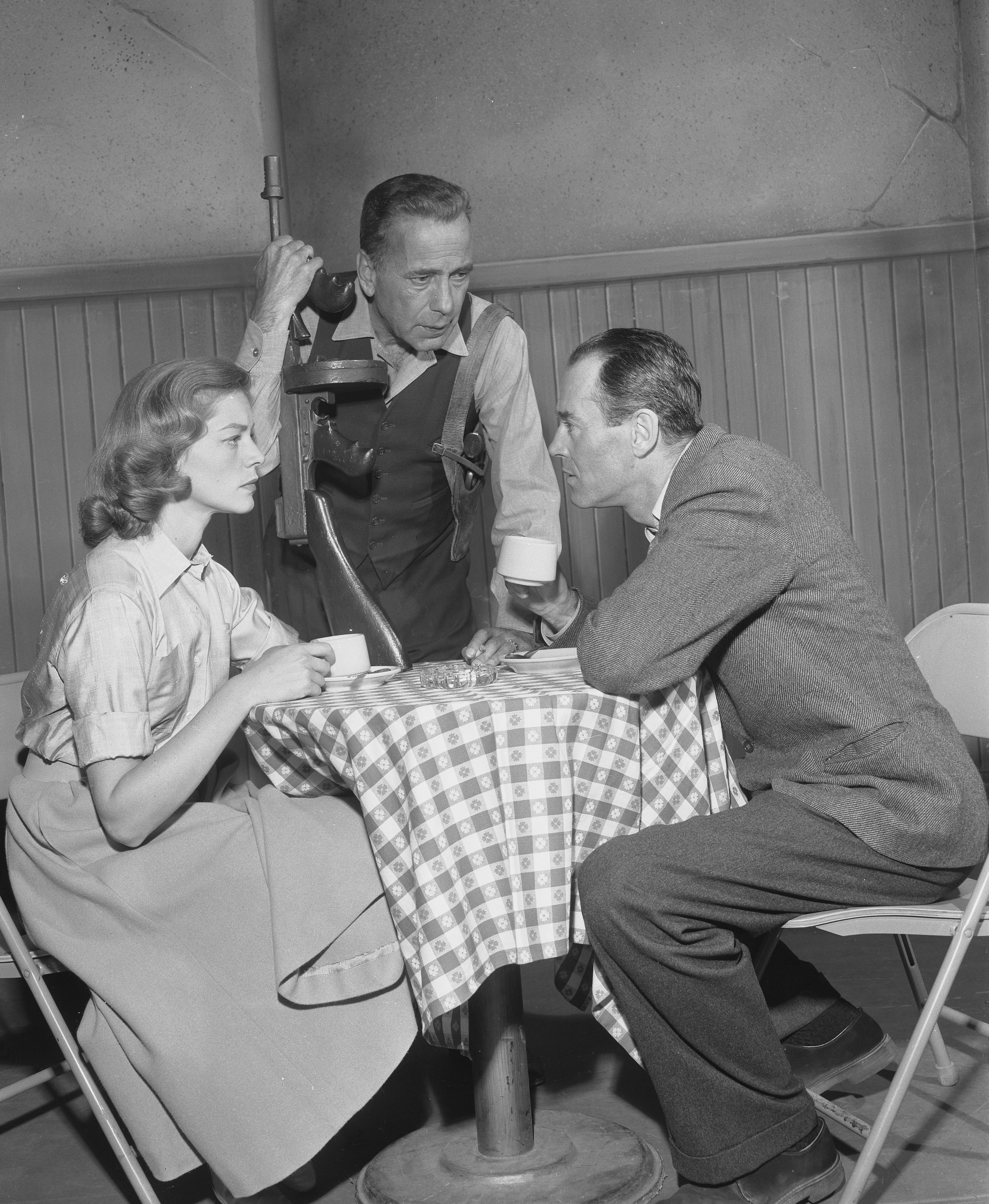
Lauren Bacall, Humphrey Bogart, and Henry Fonda in the 1955 live televised version

The Petrified Forest was performed in a one-hour radio adaptation on CBS's Lux Radio Theatre on November 22, 1937, with Herbert Marshall, Margaret Sullavan, and Donald Meek in the principal roles; and again on Lux Radio on April 23, 1945, with Ronald Colman, Susan Hayward, and Lawrence Tierney.

A half-hour radio adaptation starring Joan Bennett, Tyrone Power, and Bogart also aired on The Screen Guild Theater on January 7, 1940.

On September 20, 1953, the radio series Best Plays aired a one-hour adaptation, starring Cyril Ritchard and Joan Lorring.

In 1955, a live television version was performed in color as an installment of Producers' Showcase, a weekly dramatic anthology, featuring Bogart (now top-billed) as Mantee, Henry Fonda as Alan, and Lauren Bacall as Gabrielle. Jack Klugman, Richard Jaeckel, and Jack Warden played supporting roles. The television version differs from the film in that it opens with Bogart and his men shown briefly in a getaway car driving through the desert and conversing for a moment. In the late 1990s, Bacall donated the only known kinescope of the 1955 performance (albeit in black and white) to the Museum of Television & Radio (now the Paley Center for Media), where it remains archived for viewing in New York City and Los Angeles. It is now in the public domain.

== Reception and legacy ==
Review aggregator Rotten Tomatoes lists the film with a 100% fresh based on 14 contemporary and modern reviews.

In January 1936, Variety wrote:

The picture sticks closely to the legit script... Playing the roles they created in the stage version are Leslie Howard and Humphrey Bogart – the former a soul-broken, disillusioned author, seeking, by wayfaring, to find some new significance in living, and the latter a killer, harried and surrounded by pursuers, revealing in his last moments a bewildered desperation which is not far removed from that of the writer. The scenes in which the desperado holds court, as he awaits his own doom, ... are packed with skillfully etched drama and embroidered with appropriate touches of comedy. Impressively enacted is the romance between Howard and Bette Davis... Davis gives a characterization that fetches both sympathy and admiration. Bogart’s menace leaves nothing wanting.

Writing for The Spectator in 1936, Graham Greene gave the film a mildly poor review. Exploring the transition between Mayo's film and the original stage play from Sherwood, Greene found that Sherwood's lofty philosophy suffered from the adaptation and that the film's "drama slackens under the weight" of the playwright's themes which he characterized as "rather half-baked". Greene praised Davis and Howard for their performances but suggested that "life itself, which crept in during the opening scene [...] crept out again, leaving us only with the symbols."

Writing for Maclean's magazine at the time of the film's release, Ann Ross observed, "Very young people won't find The Petrified Forest much fun, but adults, who like wise and witty talk, with or without gunplay, should find it rewarding."

Writing for Sur in September 1936, Jorge Luis Borges said the film was "one of the most intense that I have seen." He praised the "extraordinarily distinct characters", observing that “once the allegorical motive is dismissed or relegated to a secondary level. the plot of The Petrified Forest—-the magical influence of approaching death on a random group of men and women—-seems admirable to me. In this film, death works like hypnosis or alcohol: it brings the recesses of the soul into the light of day.”

After the film's release, Friz Freleng made the short-length Merrie Melodies cartoon parody, She Was an Acrobat's Daughter (1937), which portrays a cinema audience watching The Petrified Florist, starring Bette Savis and Lester Coward.

In 1972, a take-off of the film titled "The Putrefied Forest" was a sketch on The Carol Burnett Show, featuring Steve Lawrence and Paul Sand.

The Warner Bros. sound stage on which the movie was filmed later became the home of Conan O'Brien's TBS television program.

The 2017 album The Petrified Forest by ambient musician Biosphere uses many clips of dialog from the film.
