= George Manker Watters =

American playwright and screenwriter

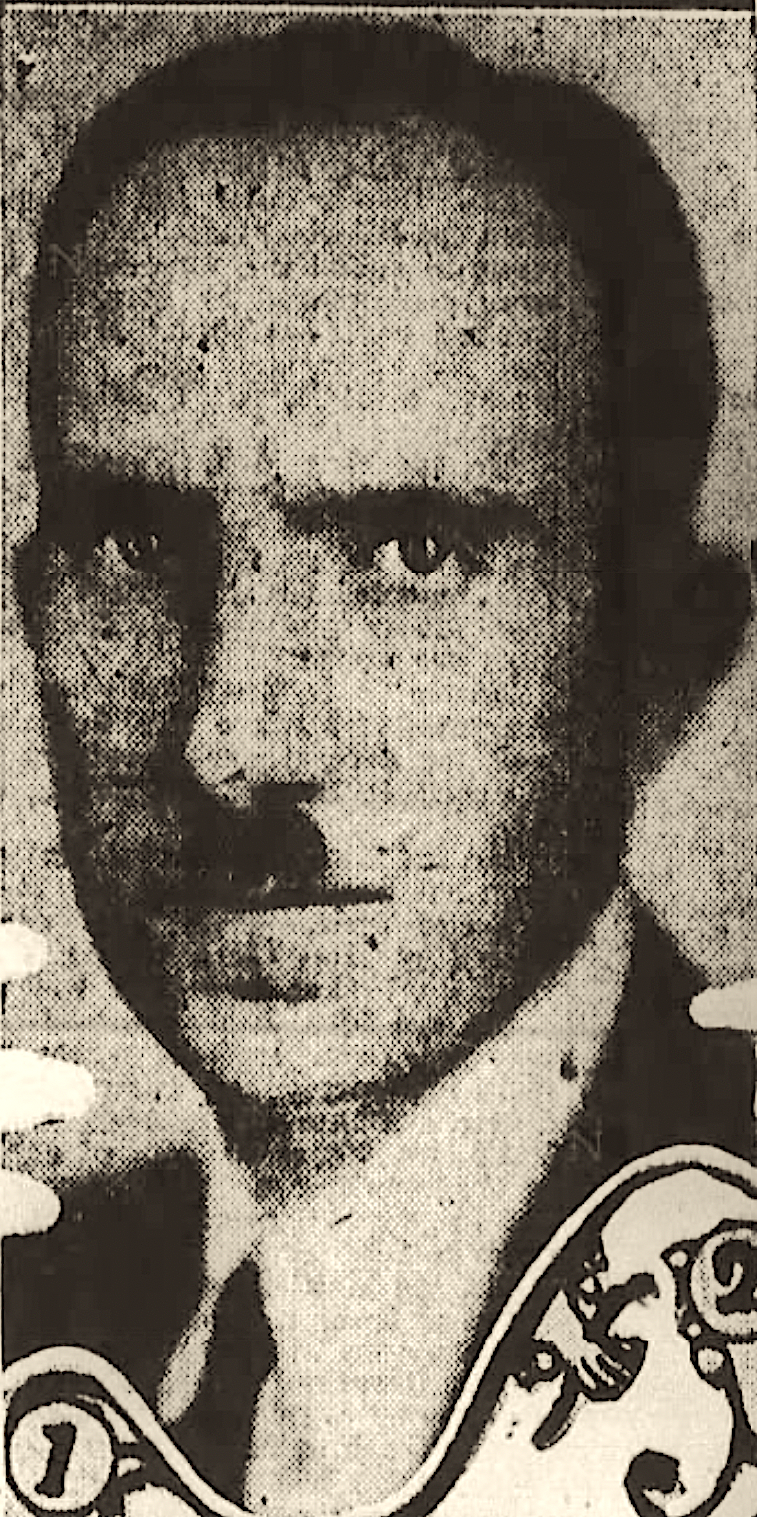
George Manker Watters in 1923

George Manker Watters (April 27, 1890 (Note: Primary documents vary as to when George Watters was born and vary on his middle name. According to U.S., Social Security Applications and Claims Index, 1936-2007 and the California, U.S., Death Index, 1940-1997, George Manker Watters was born in Rochester, New York on April 27, 1892. However, Watters's World War I and World War II draft registration cards list his name as George Daniel Watters and his date of birth in Rochester as two years earlier on April 27, 1890. The latter draft card from 1942 gives occupation details which identically match Watters position with Fox Theatres as detailed in his 1943 obituary. Additionally, the earlier birth date of 1890 matches census records for George Watters in both the 1920 United States Federal Census and 1930 United States Federal Census where his wife's name is also given. It also matches biographical details about George Manker Watters published in Two Rivers Reporter on April 2, 1929 which states he was 18 years old in 1908 when he was managing a theatre company in his early career followed by a period managing the Princess Theatre in Des Moines, Iowa. Newspaper reports from Iowa matching this early account of his career use the name George D. Watters. and newspapers from his home town of Des Moines, Iowa covered his work as the playwright of Burlesque using his birth name of George D. Watters. In 1917 Watters married the actress Tamnson Manker. His later pen name of George Manker Watters appears to have been adopted from his wife's maiden surname.) – March 14, 1943) was an American playwright, screenwriter, theatre manager, and film and theatre company executive. Born George Daniel Watters II, he was the son of organist George Daniel Watters I and grew up in Des Moines, Iowa where his father had worked as organist at St. Ambrose Cathedral. He began his career at the age of 18 as theatrical manager of a traveling theatre company; a post he held until 1910. He briefly lived in New York City before returning to his native city of Des Moines in 1911 to become manager of the Princess Theatre. He married Tamzon Manker, an actress working for him at the Princess, in June 1917, and later adopted her surname when he began working as a playwright using the name George Manker Watters.

In December 1918 Watters resigned from his post at the Princess Theatre after co-founding the New Art Film Corporation in Des Moines, and moved to California in January 1919 where the company leased the former studio of the recently defunct Balboa Amusement Producing Company in Long Beach. Watters wrote his first screenplay for the company's first picture, the 1919 silent film The Solitary Sin, for which he also served as producer. The film company folded in 1921, and after this Watters worked for the next five years as a theatre manager in various locations, including Texas, Arkansas, Alabama, and Ohio.

By 1926 Watters was manager of Boadway's Astor Theatre. With Arthur Hopkins, he co-authored the play Burlesque which was a hit on Boadway in 1927–1928. In 1928 Watters moved to Los Angeles to join the writing staff of Paramount Pictures who had acquired to film rights to Burlesque. He remained active as a screenwriter in Hollywood through 1937, and then worked as an executive for Fox Theatres under Charles Skouras. At the time of his death in Los Angeles in 1943 he was director of the Los Angeles Theater Defense Bureau and was a leader in the War Activities Committee of the Motion Pictures Industry.

== Early life and career in Iowa ==
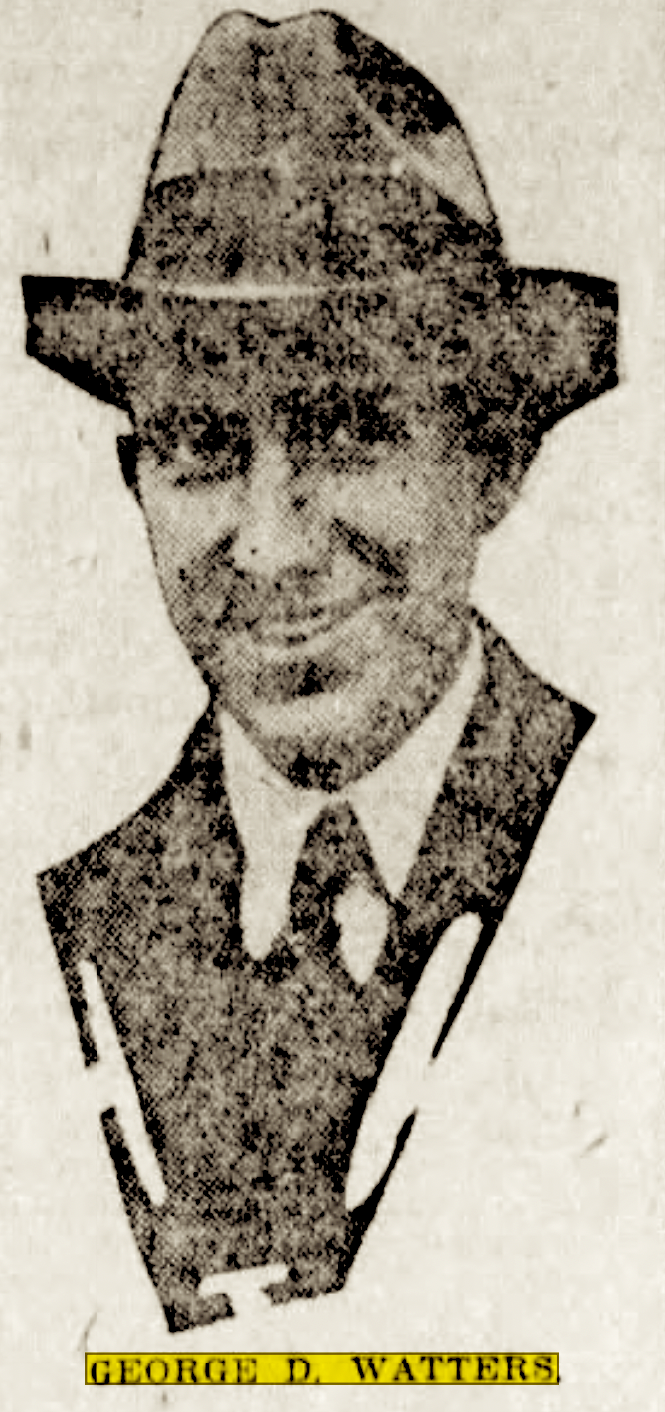
Photograph of George Manker Watters published in The Des Moines Register on December 14, 1918. At this point in his career he was known professionally as George D. Watters.

George Daniel Watters II was born in Rochester, New York on April 27, 1890. He was the son of George Daniel Watters I and his wife Nettie. His mother was a native of Des Moines, Iowa and was the daughter of German immigrants Charles Alexander and Louisa Boehler. His father was a musician and a native of Rochester, New York who held the post of organist at the St. Patrick's Cathedral in that city. His father moved to Des Moines after being appointed organist at St. Ambrose Cathedral. His father died in Denver, Colorado in late March 1890; a month before the birth of his son. His mother remarried to J. F. O'Neil.

Watters was educated at schools in Des Moines. In 1908, at the age of 18, he began his professional career as manager of a touring theatre company led by the actor Lon Chaney that was performing the play The Royal Chel. He managed this company through 1910. He married his first wife, Cora Belle Beerse, on July 25, 1910, in Saint Paul, Minnesota.

After a brief period living in New York City, Watters became manager of the repertory theatre troupe, the Princess Stock Company, in Des Moines, Iowa which was then headlined by the actor Conrad Nagel. He was appointed manager of the Princess Theatre in Des Moines by its owners, Elbert & Getchell in 1911. His first wife filed for divorce in December 1913, and the marriage was dissolved on January 7, 1914. After the divorce, he briefly left Des Moines and his position at the Princess Theatre to become manager of the Jack Singer Stock Company for performances at the Columbia Theatre in Chicago and the Gaiety Theatre in Detroit; but by August 1914 he was once again back in his position managing the Princess Theatre.

By February 1917 Watters had enlisted as a lieutenant in the United States Army Reserve and had completed his training in Saint Louis while still maintaining his post at the Princess Theatre. He married the actress Tamzon Manker in Omaha, Nebraska on June 5, 1917. Tamzon was an actor in the stock company at the Princess. Their first child was born not long after and was named George Daniel Watters III.

== New Art Film Company and theatre manager ==
In 1918 Watters co-founded the New Art Film Corporation in Des Moines and was appointed general manager of the film company. He briefly continued to work concurrently as manager of the Princess Theatre but ultimately resigned from his post at the Princess in December 1918.

In 1919 Watters and his family moved to California where the Des Moines-based New Art Film Company had leased the old film studio of the defunct Balboa Amusement Producing Company in Long Beach. The company's first film was the 1919 picture The Solitary Sin starring Jack Mulhall, Helene Chadwick, and Gordon Griffith. It was directed by Frederic Richard Sullivan and used a screenplay by Watters who also produced the movie.

The New Art Film Company was short lived and after two years leading the company Watters relocated to Dallas, Texas where he worked as manager of the Capitol Theater until it was destroyed by fire on Christmas Day 1921. In 1922 he became general manager of the Arkansas Enterprise Company which encompassed a chain of theaters in Arkansas. In 1923 he was appointed general manager of the Palace Theatre in Houston, Texas, and in 1924 he became general manager of both the Jefferson Theatre in Birmingham, Alabama and the Grand Opera House in Cincinnati, Ohio. By 1926 he had relocated to New York City where he was manager of Broadway's Astor Theatre.

== Burlesque and later career in Los Angeles ==
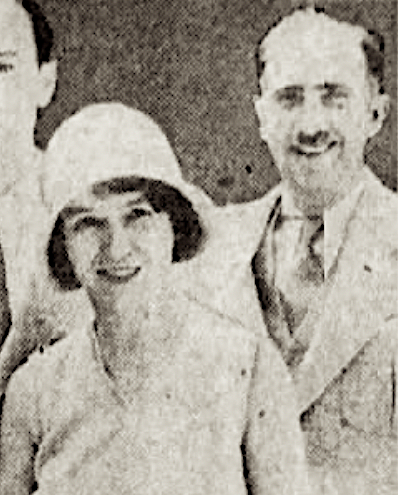
George Manker Watters (right) with his wife Tamnson Manker Watters (left) in 1929

As a playwright, Watters used the name George Manker Watters. His first major success as a writer was the play Burlesque which he co-authored with Arthur Hopkins. It was a hit play of the 1927-1928 Broadway season, and is credited with launching the career of actress Barbara Stanwyck. Watters moved to Hollywood, California when working on the first film adaption of this play for which he was one of the screenwriters. Made by Paramount Pictures, this film was released in 1929 and entitled The Dance of Life. It starred Hal Skelly in a reprisal of his role as Skid from the Broadway play. Burlesque was also the basis for the final screenplay Watters worked on, the 1937 Paramount film Swing High, Swing Low. This second film starred Carole Lombard and Fred MacMurray.

After 1928, Watters lived in Los Angeles for the remainder of his life. He had a career as a screenwriter and film industry executive. While The Dance of Life was the first project he worked on for Paramount Pictures, his first film with the company to reach theaters as a screenwriter was the 1928 film The Sawdust Paradise. He co-authored the screenplay for this film with Louise Long and Julian Johnson. Also for Paramount, he adapted Mildred Cram's short story "The Feeder" into the screenplay for the 1930 film Behind the Make-Up; another film starring Hal Skelly who was paired opposite the actress Fay Wray. This screenplay was later the basis for the 1932 French language film adaptation, Maquillage.

Watters was a screenwriter for the 1930 Universal Pictures film Captain of the Guard. That same year he wrote the screenplays to Good Intentions and Man Trouble for Fox Film. He ended his career working as an executive under Charles Skouras at Fox Theatres. At the time of his death in 1943 during World War II, he was a leader in the War Activities Committee of the Motion Pictures Industry where he was coordinator overseeing the group's activities in Southern California, Nevada, and Arizona. He was also the director of the Los Angeles Theater Defense Bureau.

Watters died of a heart attack in Los Angeles at his home at 414 S Muirfield Rd on March 14, 1943. His play Burlesque continued to inspire adaptations after his death, including the 1948 film When My Baby Smiles at Me starring Betty Grable and Dan Dailey.

== Notes and references ==
=== Bibliography ===
- Bradley, Edwin M. (2004). The First Hollywood Musicals: A Critical Filmography of 171 Features, 1927 Through 1932. McFarland & Company. ISBN 9780786420292.
- Fisher, James; Hardison Londré, Felicia (2009). "Burlesque". The A to Z of American Theater: Modernism. Scarecrow Press. ISBN 9780810868847.
- Paietta, Ann C. (2015). Saints, Clergy and Other Religious Figures on Film and Television, 1895-2003. McFarland & Company. ISBN 9781476610160.
- Wainscott, Ronald (2024). "Arthur Hopkins's Second Act: After the Crash". In Black, Cheryl (ed.). The Great North American Stage Directors, Volume 1: Belasco, Hopkins, Webster. Bloomsbury Publishing. ISBN 9781350189324.
