= Burlesque (play) =

1927 play by George Manker Watters and Arthur Hopkins

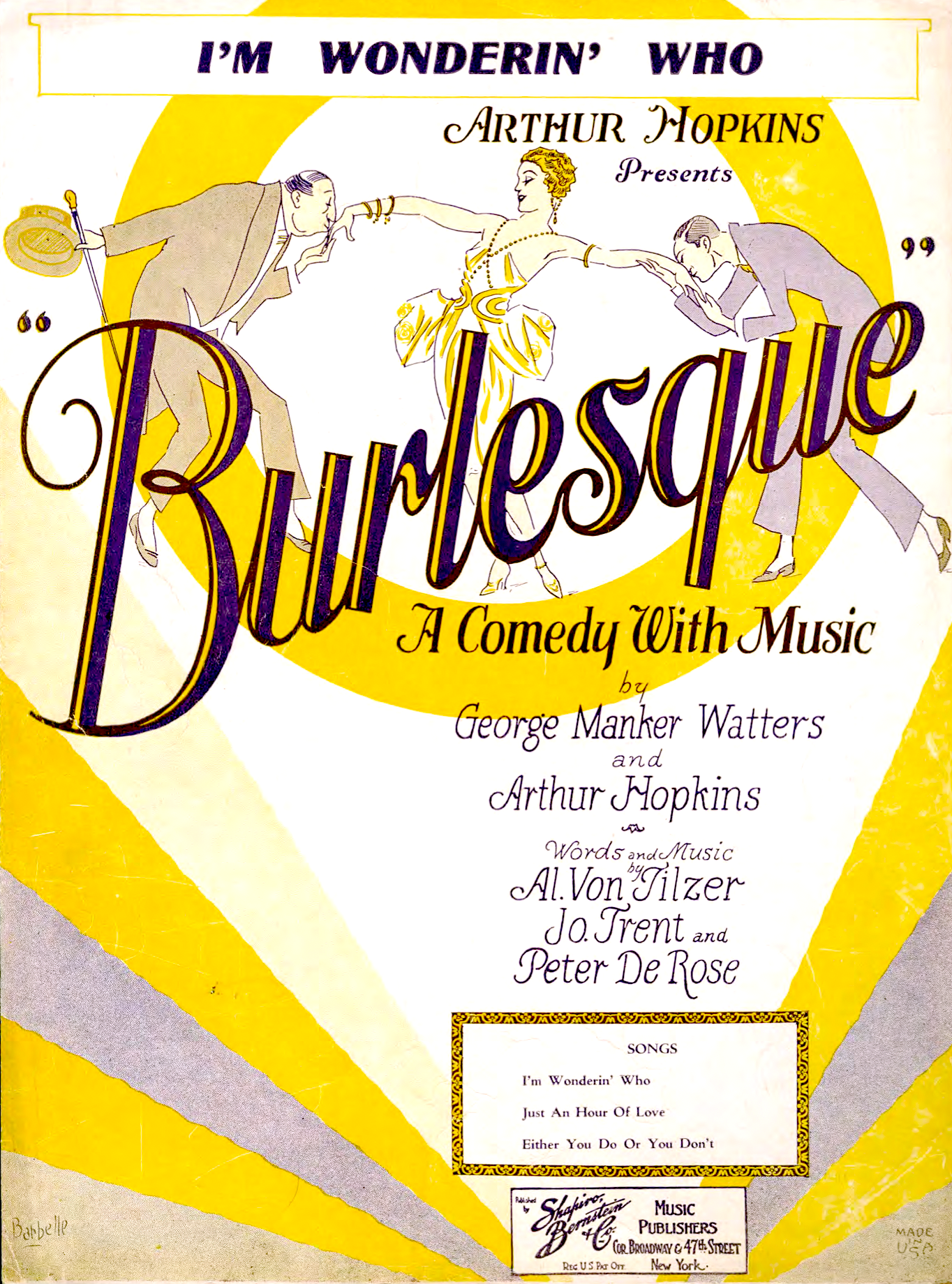
Front cover of the 1927 sheet music for the song "I'm Wonderin Who" from Burlesque.

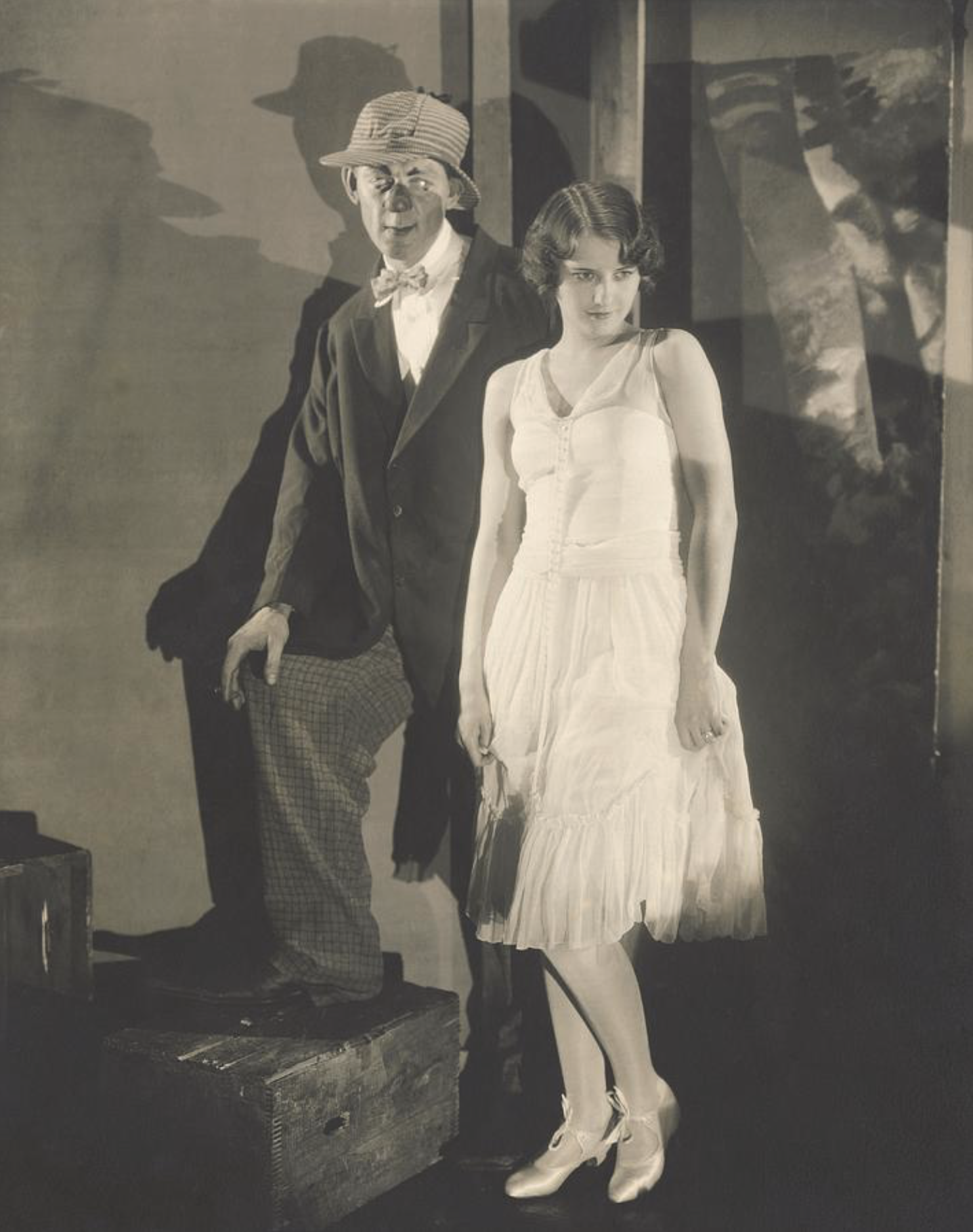
Barbara Stanwyck and Hal Skelly in the 1927 Broadway production of Burlesque.

Burlesque is a play in three acts co-written by George Manker Watters and Arthur Hopkins. While described as a "play with music" and not strictly speaking a musical, the show did include songs with music by Albert Von Tilzer and Peter De Rose, and lyrics by Joe Trent and Edward Grant. A backstage drama set in the 1920s, the play tells the story of a husband and wife performing duo, Ralph "Skid" Johnson and Bonny King, who are smalltime burlesque theater performers in the United States. Their marriage is tested when Skid lands a job as leading comic in a hit Broadway show and the couple finds that success and fame come with a cost.

Burlesque was a hit play of the 1927-1928 Broadway season, and had a successful Broadway revival in 1946. It was adapted multiple times into films. Actor Hal Skelly starred as Skid in both the original Broadway production, and in the film's first screen adaptation in 1929. The work is remembered for being an important early stage success in the career of actress Barbara Stanwyck who achieved acclaim in the role of Bonny in the New York production at the age of twenty.

== Plot ==
Set in the 1920s, the first act of the play takes place in a dressing room at a burlesque theater somewhere in the Midwestern United States. The plot follows burlesque show comic Skid Johnson and his wife, the dancer Bonny King, as they seek to move their way up in the entertainment world. Skid is talented and ambitious, but self-destructive with a penchant for drinking to excess and a wandering eye for women. Bonny loves him dearly but can also be acerbic in her wit towards him while possessing charisma and charm. Skid lands a job as a leading comic in a big Broadway musical show; taking that gig after being persuaded to pursue it by the chorus girl Sylvia Marco with whom he has been flirting. To get Skid's attention, Bonny flirts with a rich rancher Harvey Howell who has been buying tickets to their show every night.

The second act takes place at a hotel suite in New York City. Success and fame has led Skid to wander from his marriage, and he has an affair with Sylvia. Bonny decides to seek a divorce from him and marry the rancher. When Skid learns Bonny is suing him for divorce and marrying someone else he gets drunk and loses his job. The final act takes place at the Star Theatre in Paterson, New Jersey where Bonny is working once again in the same burlesque show after separating from Skid. Hat in hand, Skid returns to Bonny who forgives him, and they resume their marriage and performing together in the burlesque show.

== History ==
Theatre scholar Felicia Hardison Londré described Burlesque as a backstage comedy drama that was "especially vibrant" in its "depiction of seedy glamour and jazzy lingo." The play opened at Broadway's Plymouth Theatre on September 1, 1927 where it ran for 372 performances; closing on July 14, 1928. The original production starred Hal Skelly as Skid and Barbara Stanwyck as Bonny. It was an important first success in the career of Stanwyck who was twenty years old at the time. Indiana University theatre professor Ronald Wainscott stated that the role raised her profile "from chorus girl to stardom which not long after took her to Hollywood".

Despite the positive impact Burlesque had on Stanwyck's career, the play was not considered a major vehicle for star talent, and was viewed as more of an ensemble oriented play. While Bonny and Skid's story was at the center of the drama, the work featured eight full-scale Burlesque acts. Many of these featured the talents of secondary characters in the Burlesque troupe; although the final act was a soft shoe dance between Skid and Bonny in which the characters reconcile. Other cast members in the show included Ruth Holden as Sylvia Marco, Charles D. Brown as Lefty, the manager of the burlesque troupe, Oscar Levant as the pianist and songwriter Jerry Evans, Paul Porter as Jimmy the stage manager, Jack B. Shea as the dancer Fireman Scotty, and Ralph Theodore as the cattleman Harvey Howell.

Burns Mantle described the original production as a "rough drama in the sense that its cross-sections life among the lowly and uncultured performers of the burlesque theatres, revealing them on good authority as they live and as they are."

Burlesque was later successfully revived on Broadway at the Belasco Theatre where it played from December 1946 through January 1948. The cast was led by Bert Lahr and Jean Parker. Hopkins was the director for both the original 1927 production and the 1946 revival.

== Adaptations ==
The popularity of the stage version of Burlesque in both its original production and its later revival made it an attractive candidate for film adaptations. It was first adapted by Paramount Pictures into the 1929 film The Dance of Life with Hal Skelly reprising his role as Skid from the stage production. This was later followed by a second Paramount picture, Swing High, Swing Low (1937) which starred Carole Lombard and Fred MacMurray. A third and final film adaptation, When My Baby Smiles at Me (1948), was made starring Betty Grable and Dan Dailey. It was made by 20th Century Fox who acquired the rights to Burlesque after the success of the Broadway revival in the mid 1940s.

Burlesque was also adapted into a radio play for the Lux Radio Theatre. The 1936 broadcast of the play on this program starred Al Jolson and his wife Ruby Keeler.
