= Arthur Hopkins =

American Broadway theatre director and producer (1878–1950)

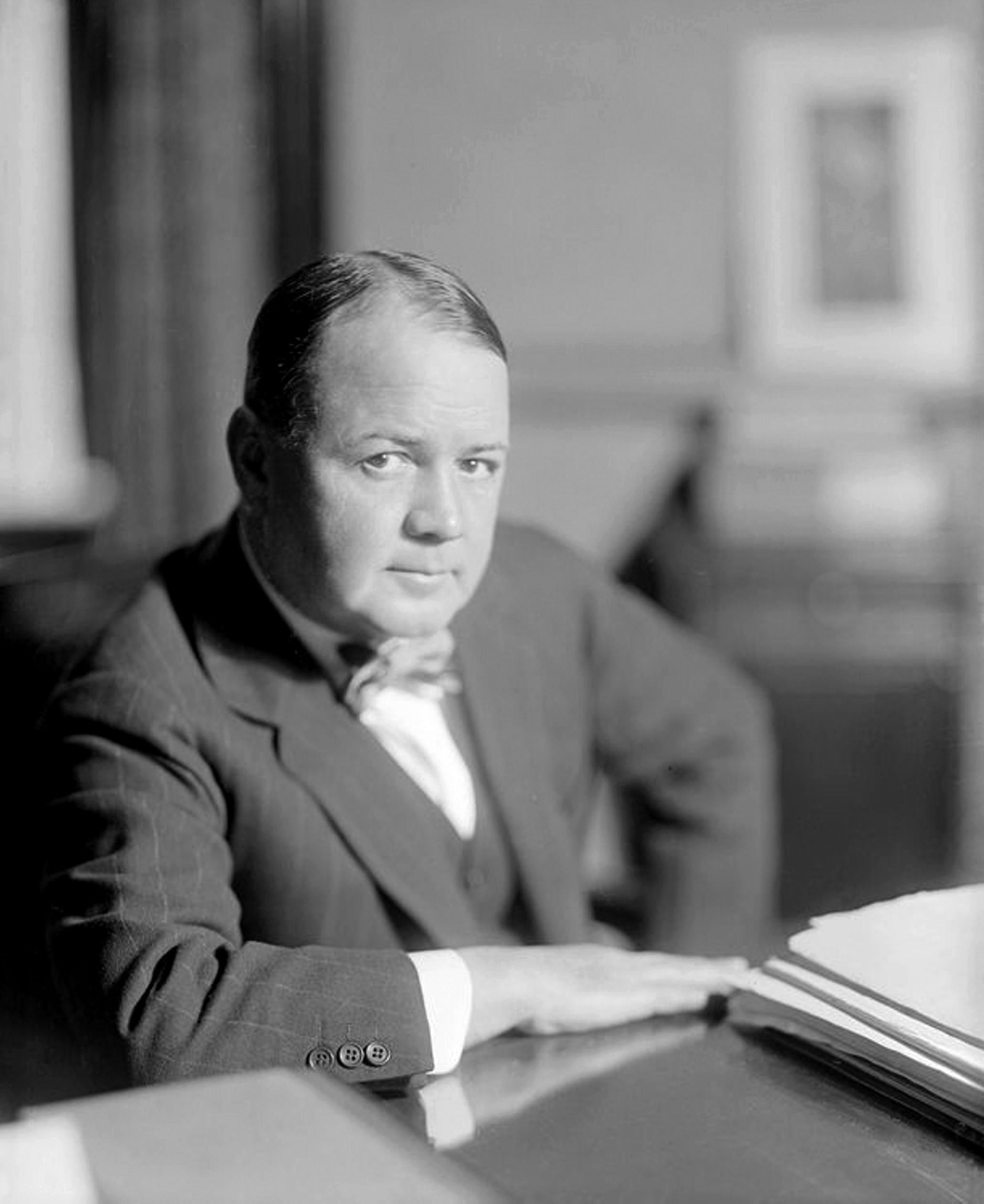
Arthur Hopkins in 1926

Arthur Hopkins (October 4, 1878 – March 22, 1950) was an American Broadway theatre producer in the early twentieth century. Between 1912 and 1948, he produced and staged more than 80 plays – an average of more than two per year – occasionally writing and directing as well. His repertoire included plays by playwrights in American Expressionist theater, including Elmer Rice, Sophie Treadwell, and Eugene O'Neill.

== Biography ==
Arthur Hopkins was born on October 4, 1878, in Cleveland. He was the youngest of ten children born to a Welsh couple, David and Mary Jane Hopkins. His autobiography is titled To a Lonely Boy. His brother, William R. Hopkins, was city manager of Cleveland.

After leaving high school, he began life as a reporter and then worked for a while as a theatrical press agent. This led to his writing a play, The Fatted Calf (1912) and to producing a show, The Poor Little Rich Girl, in 1913; it was a hit and launched his Broadway theatre career. Hopkins married Australian actress Eva MacDonald in August 1915. At the time she declared that she had retired from the stage, but in 1919 she appeared as Natasha in Night Lodging, produced by Hopkins.

He was one of Broadway's most admired producers with credits including What Price Glory?, and Anna Christie. He also co-wrote Burlesque (1927), which he staged again twenty years later; it ran from Christmas 1946 to January 1948. He directed Philip Barry's 1928 play Holiday at the Plymouth Theatre, where it ran for 229 performances. His last production – The Magnificent Yankee, based on the life of the Supreme Court Justice Oliver Wendell Holmes, Jr, in 1946 – was another hit.

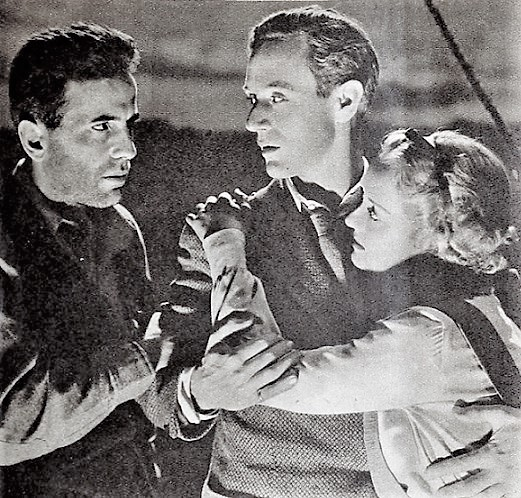
Humphrey Bogart, Leslie Howard, and Bette Davis in The Petrified Forest, 1936

Hopkins arguably was one of two key people who helped make Humphrey Bogart a star. In 1934, Hopkins heard the Broadway play Invitation to a Murder, in which Bogart was starring, from off-stage. Hopkins was very interested in Bogart for the role of the escaped murderer Duke Mantee in Robert E. Sherwood's new play, The Petrified Forest, which Hopkins was directing.

When I saw the actor I was somewhat taken aback, for [I realized] he was the one I never much admired. He was an antiquated juvenile who spent most of his stage life in white pants swinging a tennis racquet. He seemed as far from a cold-blooded killer as one could get, but the voice[,] dry and tired[,] persisted, and the voice was Mantee's.

Bogart accepted the role. The play had 197 performances at the Broadhurst Theatre in New York in 1935. and Bogart's performance was acclaimed: New York Times critic Brooks Atkinson said, "a peach ... a roaring Western melodrama ... Humphrey Bogart does the best work of his career as an actor." Bogart said that the play "marked my deliverance from the ranks of the sleek, sybaritic, stiff-shirted, swallow-tailed 'smoothies' to which I seemed condemned to life. The following year Warner Brothers bought the movie rights, but the little-known Bogart, wasn't the studio's first choice for Mantee. Hopkins' inadvertent co-conspirator, Leslie Howard, made his participation in the film contingent on Bogart's, and Bogie became a bona fide star when the movie was a big hit in 1936.

His wife Eva died in 1938.

Hopkins wrote, produced and directed a few films. For example, he produced (uncredited) and directed His Double Life (1933).

From April 19, 1944, to January 3, 1945, Hopkins produced Arthur Hopkins Presents, a one-hour dramatic anthology program on NBC radio. He also wrote a few television plays and episodes.

== Productions ==
The Claw (1922)
