= Ambassador Theatre (Broadway) =

Broadway theater in Manhattan, New York

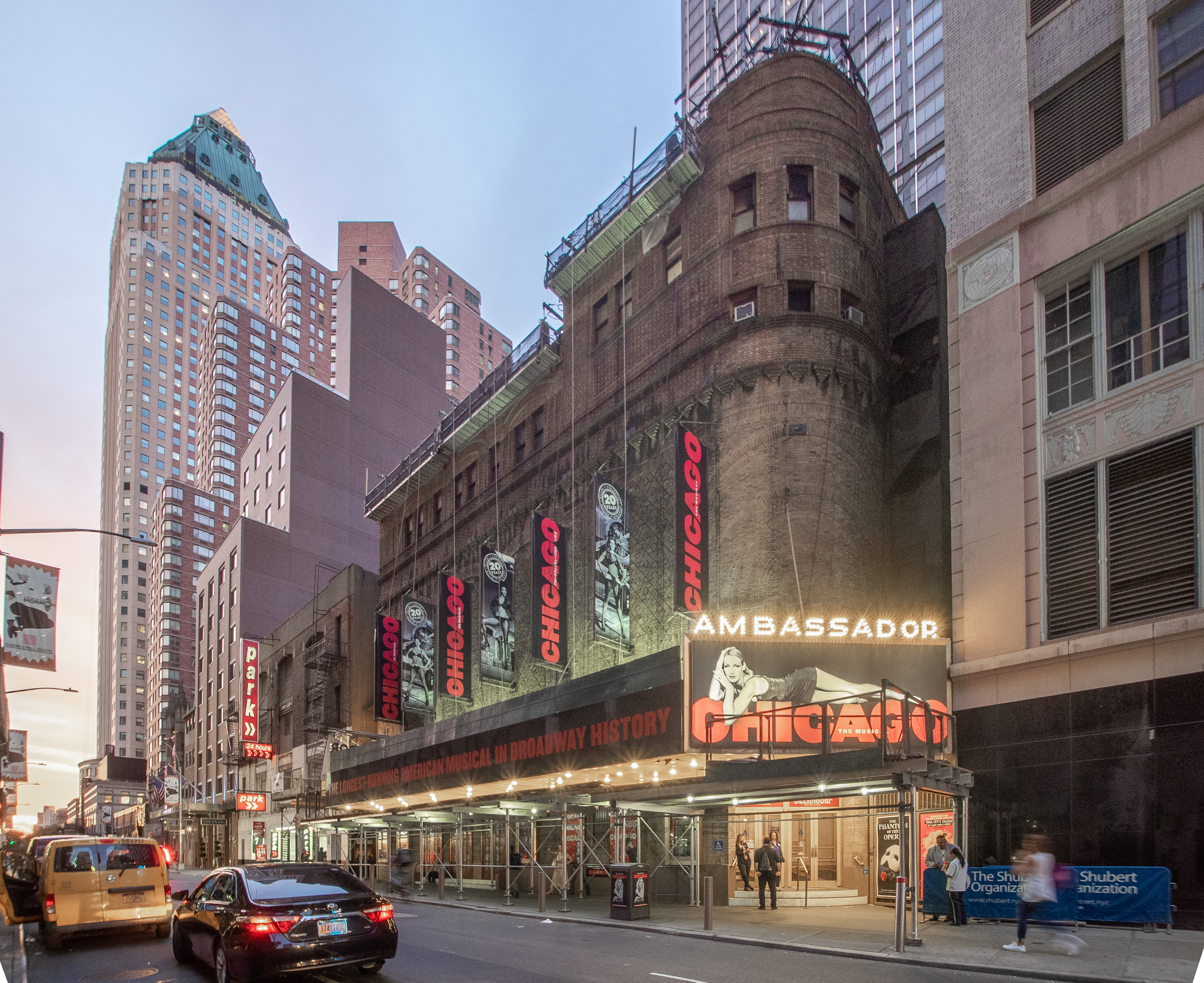
- Interactive map of Ambassador Theatre
- Address: 219 West 49th Street; Manhattan, New York; United States
- Coordinates: 40°45′40″N 73°59′06″W
- Owner: The Shubert Organization
- Capacity: 1,125
- Type: Broadway
- Production: Chicago
- Public transit: 49th Street/Seventh Avenue (N, R, and W); 50th Street/Eighth Avenue (C and E); 50th Street/Broadway (1)

Construction
- Opened: February 11, 1921 (105 years ago)
- Years active: 1921–1945, 1956–present
- Architect: Herbert J. Krapp

Website
- shubert.nyc/theatres/ambassador/

New York City Landmark
- Designated: August 6, 1985
- Reference no.: 1308
- Designated entity: Auditorium interior

The Ambassador Theatre is a Broadway theater at 219 West 49th Street in the Theater District of Midtown Manhattan in New York City, New York, U.S. Opened in 1921, the Ambassador Theatre was designed by Herbert J. Krapp and was constructed for the Shubert brothers. It has 1,125 seats across two levels and is operated by The Shubert Organization. The auditorium interior is a New York City designated landmark.

The theater is oriented on a diagonal axis, maximizing seating capacity on its small site of 100 by 100 feet (30 by 30 m). The facade is largely made of golden brick and is simple in design. The most prominent part of the facade is a curved entrance at the southeast corner, facing Broadway, where a lobby leads to the rear of the theater's orchestra level. The auditorium contains Adam-style detailing, a large balcony, and box seats with decorated arches above them. The auditorium contains a segmental proscenium arch topped by a curved sounding board.

The Shuberts developed the Ambassador, along with the neighboring O'Neill and Walter Kerr theaters, after World War I as part of a theatrical complex around 48th and 49th Streets. The Ambassador opened on February 11, 1921, with the musical The Rose Girl. The Shuberts sold the property in 1935, and it was intermittently used as a CBS broadcast studio, a movie theater, and for live theater until 1945. The Ambassador then hosted foreign films in the late 1940s and was a studio for the DuMont Television Network in the early 1950s. In 1956, the Shuberts assumed ownership again, returning it to use as a live theater. Many of the Ambassador's productions in the 20th century were short runs. Since 2003, the theater has hosted the musical Chicago, which in 2014 became the second-longest-running Broadway show.

== Site ==
The Ambassador Theatre is on 219 West 49th Street, on the north sidewalk between Eighth Avenue and Broadway, in the Midtown Manhattan neighborhood of New York City, New York, U.S. The square land lot covers 10,050 square feet (934 m^{2}), with a frontage of 100 feet (30 m) on 49th Street and a depth of 100 feet. The Ambassador shares the block with the St. Malachy Roman Catholic Church to the west, The Theater Center to the northeast, and the Brill Building to the east. Other nearby buildings include Paramount Plaza (including Circle in the Square Theatre and the Gershwin Theatre) to the north; the Winter Garden Theatre to the northeast; the Crowne Plaza Times Square Manhattan hotel to the southeast; the Eugene O'Neill Theatre and Walter Kerr Theatre to the south; and One Worldwide Plaza to the west.

== Design ==
The Ambassador Theatre was designed by Herbert J. Krapp and was constructed in 1921 for the Shubert brothers. It is part of a group of six theaters planned by the Shuberts after World War I, of which four were built. Theatrical historian Ken Bloom wrote of the Ambassador in 2007: "Broadway historians blame the Ambassador's relatively lackluster career to the extreme width of the theater due to its odd placement on the lot and its relatively bland facade." The Ambassador is operated by the Shubert Organization.

=== Facade ===
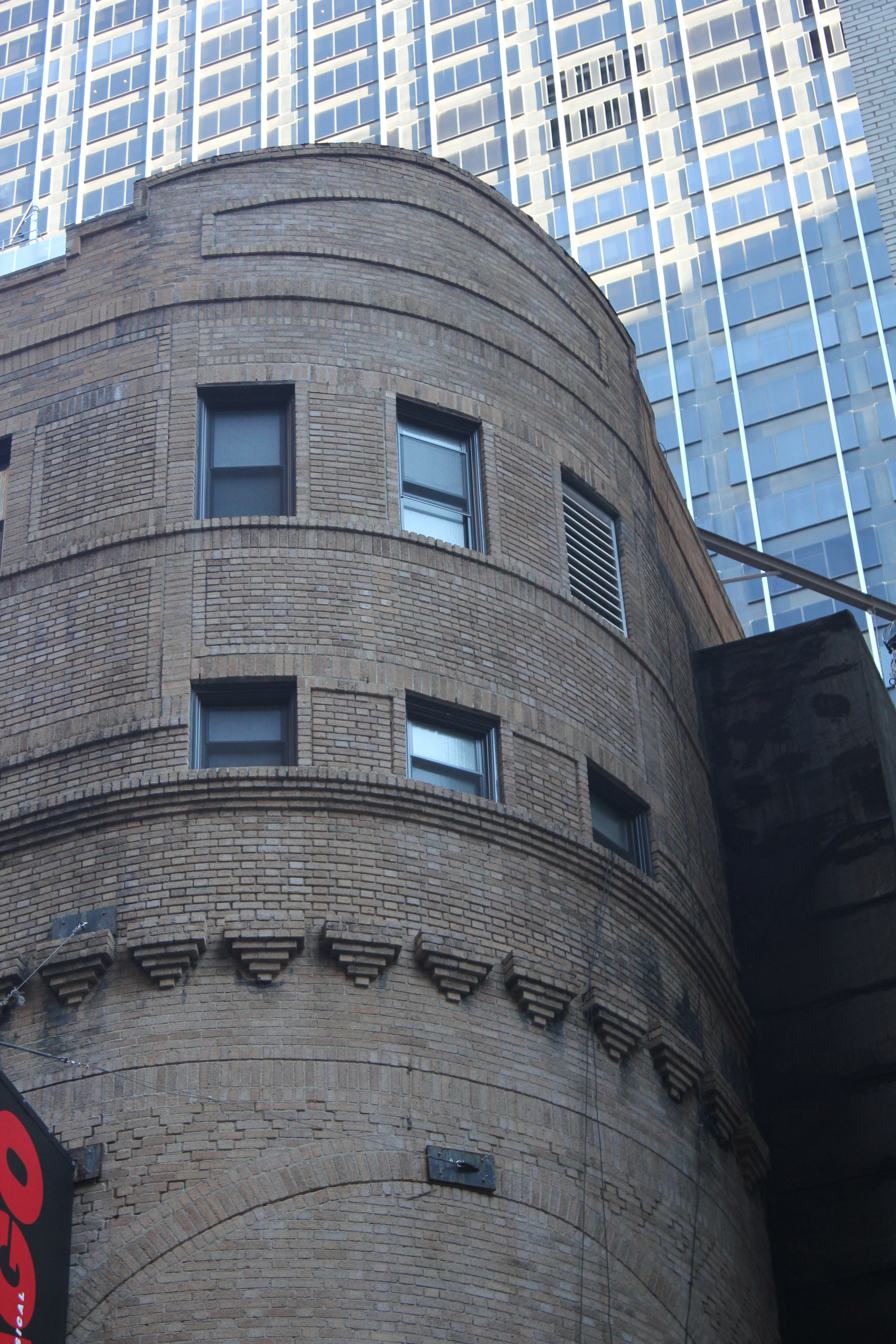
Detail of rounded corner, with a molding below the attic windows

The theater is shorter than its width. At ground level, the facade contains a water table made of stone. The rest of the facade has gold-beige brick, which is laid in a diaper pattern. The facade is simple in design, especially when compared with Krapp's other works for the Shubert family. The Ambassador and Ritz (now Walter Kerr) theaters, in particular, were designed in patterned brick, with the only ornamentation being in the arrangement of the brick. This sparse ornamentation may be attributed to the lack of money in the years after World War I.

Similar to Krapp's earlier Broadhurst and Plymouth theaters, the Ambassador Theatre has a curved corner at the eastern portion of the facade, facing Broadway. This corner contains the main entrance, which is through a set of metal-and-glass doors. The center section of the facade has display boxes, and the western section has three pairs of wood-and-glass doors with segmental arches above them. A marquee hangs above the first floor. The main section of the facade is decorated in a diaper pattern and lacks window openings (some windows are infilled at the second floor near the corner). There are also blind arches on the second and third stories.

A molding with corbels forms a fake cornice above the third floor. The fourth floor contains windows within brick openings. There is a parapet above the fourth floor, which wraps around the eastern corner. The western facade is plain brick with a fire escape.

=== Auditorium ===
The auditorium has an orchestra level, one balcony, boxes, and a stage behind the proscenium arch. According to the Shubert Organization, the auditorium has 1,114 seats; meanwhile, Playbill cites 1,080 seats and The Broadway League cites 1,125 seats. The physical seats are divided into 573 seats in the orchestra (including 41 in the orchestra pit), 264 at the front of the balcony, 250 at the rear of the balcony, and 8 in the boxes. There are also 19 standing-room only spots.

The auditorium was originally decorated with solid gold leaf. The color scheme was initially in gold and red, similar to that of the Shubert Theatre. Due to the small site dimensions, the auditorium is oriented on a diagonal axis to increase seating capacity, with the stage to the northwest and the lobby to the southeast. The diagonal plan could fit 1,300 seats, but a typical layout, where the proscenium and the stage were parallel to the street, could only net 900 seats. The side walls of the auditorium are significantly curved, and the auditorium has a roughly hexagonal layout. The diagonal arrangement allowed the northeast and southwest corners of the site to be occupied by other rooms such as lounges.

==== Seating areas ====
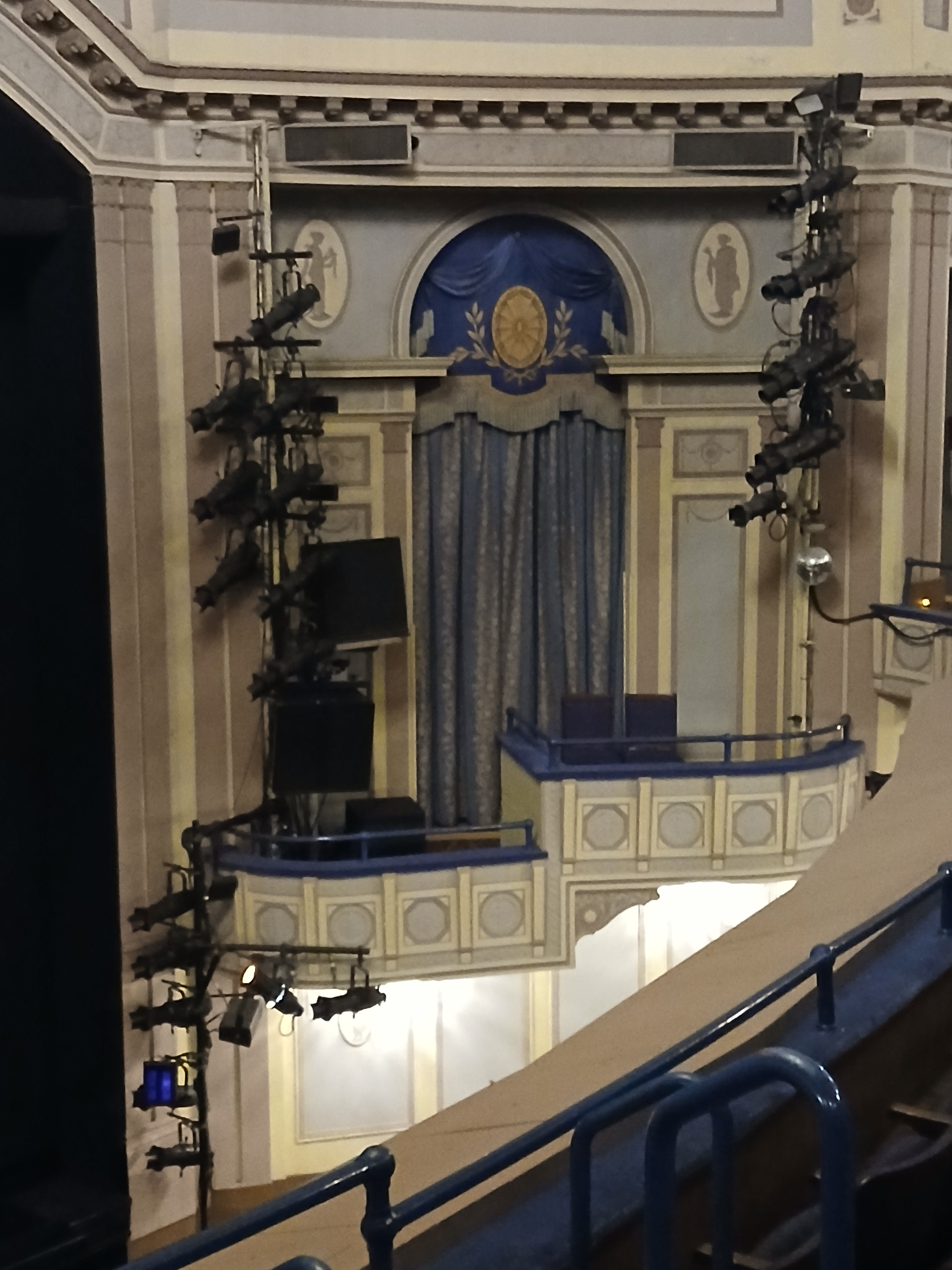
The right-hand box

The auditorium's outer walls are non-bearing walls, with the weight of the balcony resting on columns. A vestibule was placed between the ticket lobby and auditorium to reduce drafty air from outdoors. The rear of the orchestra contains doors from the ticket lobby. Additional doors to the orchestra are placed along the side walls at the front, near the boxes. Coatrooms were placed next to the side entrances. The orchestra floor is raked, sloping down toward the stage. A promenade wraps around the orchestra's rear and sides. The rear of the orchestra has a standing rail made of marble, separating the promenade from the rear rows of seats. There are also paneled-marble walls, which curve around to the sides. A cornice with swags runs above the orchestra wall. There are stairways up to the balcony with marble walls.

The balcony level is divided into front and rear sections by an aisle halfway across its depth. The walls of the balcony level are angled sideways to accommodate the theater's shape. The side walls (near the boxes) are decorated in the Adam style, with fan shapes inside arches, which in turn are augmented by motifs such as swags. The rear walls and the balcony's underside contain plasterwork paneling. The balcony's front rail contains Adam-style paneling and lights. A smoking room and a mezzanine room adjoined the balcony level.

On either side of the proscenium is a wall section with two boxes at balcony level; the box nearer the stage is curved outward. The boxes' wall sections are flanked by paneling and two pilasters on either side. Paneled walls exist at the orchestra level, where the former boxes there have been removed. The fronts of each box contain paneling with Adam-style medallions. A segmental arch rises above the boxes, with Adam-style panels on either side of the arch, above the pilasters. A frieze and a cornice with modillions runs above the boxes.

==== Other design features ====
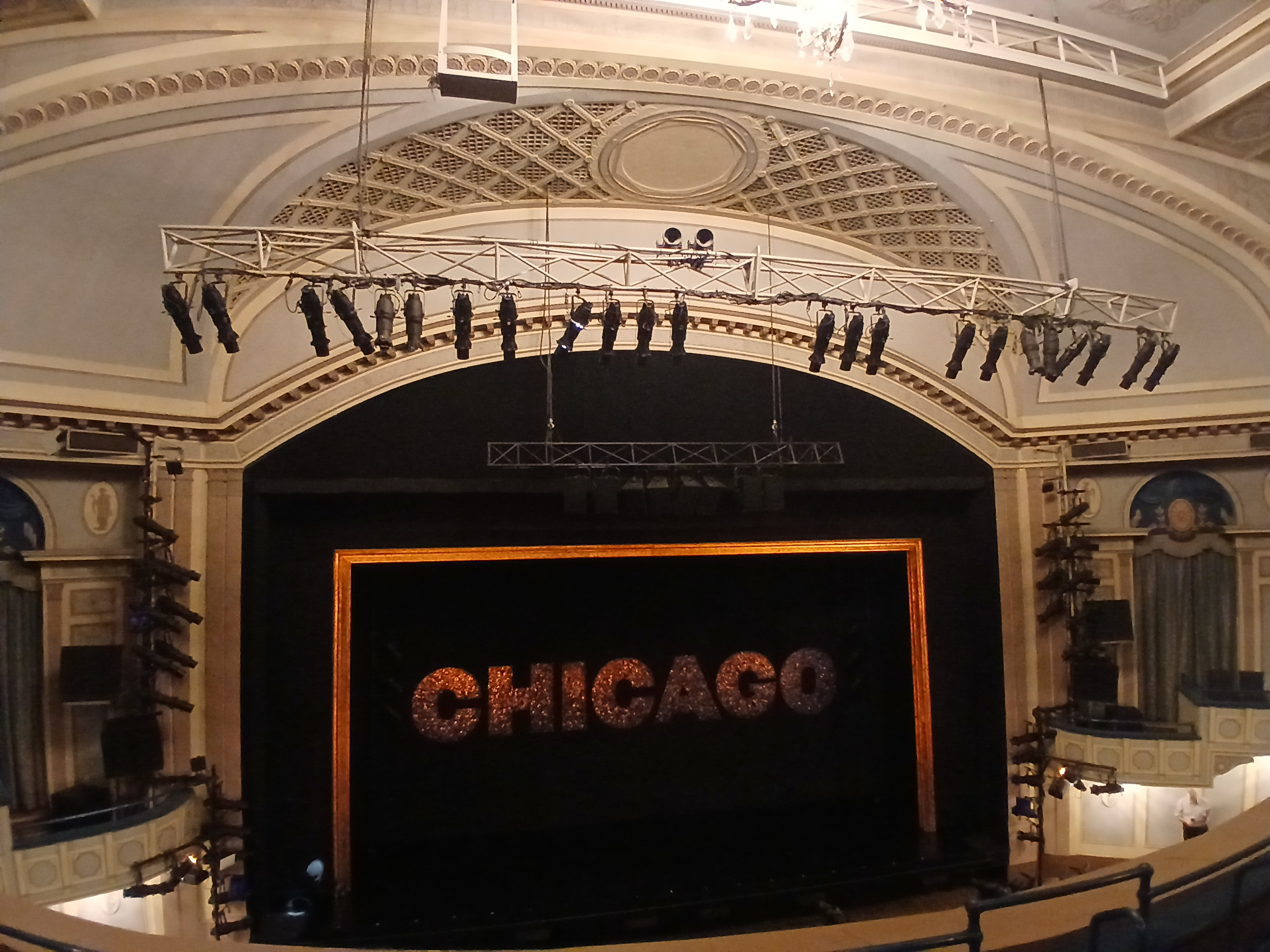
View of the proscenium from the balcony

The auditorium contains a segmental proscenium arch. The proscenium measures 44 feet 11 inches (13.69 m) wide and 25 feet 3 inches (7.70 m) high. Two pilasters are placed on either side, while the top of the proscenium has a frieze and cornice, which are continuations of those above the boxes. The sounding board curves onto the ceiling above the proscenium arch and is decorated with grilles and Adam-style panels. The ceiling contains a shallow oval dome at the center, with a chandelier hanging from the dome and Adam-style grotesques inside. The rear of the ceiling contains a partial dome with motifs of fans. The ceiling is otherwise divided into coffered sections with Adam-style reliefs. A frieze and a cornice run just below the ceiling. The depth of the auditorium to the proscenium is 28 feet 4 inches (8.64 m), while the depth to the front of the stage is 31 feet 2 inches (9.50 m).

== History ==
Times Square became the epicenter for large-scale theater productions between 1900 and the Great Depression. During the 1900s and 1910s, many theaters in Midtown Manhattan were developed by the Shubert brothers, one of the major theatrical syndicates of the time. The Shuberts originated from Syracuse, New York, and expanded downstate into New York City in the first decade of the 20th century. The brothers controlled a quarter of all plays and three-quarters of theatrical ticket sales in the U.S. by 1925. After World War I, the Shuberts contemplated the construction of six theaters along 48th and 49th Streets, just north of Times Square. Of these, only four were built, and only three (the Ambassador, O'Neill, and Kerr) survive. (Note: The other was the 49th Street Theatre at 235 West 49th Street, which opened in 1921 and was demolished in 1940.)

=== Original Broadway run ===
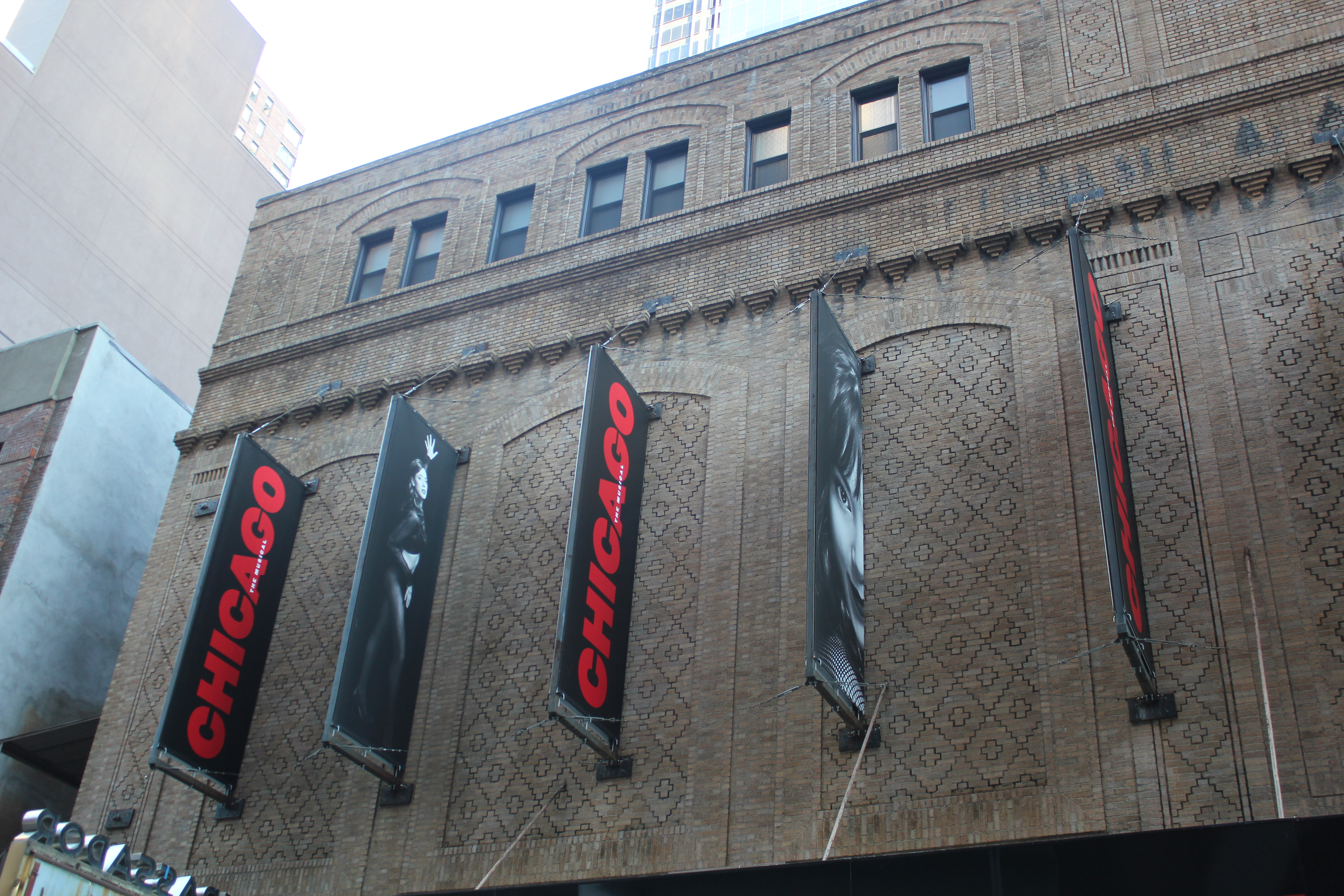
Facade view

The Shuberts announced plans for their six new theaters in September 1920. The Ambassador, announced that November, was the first new theater that the Shuberts planned to build along 48th and 49th Streets. The Shuberts held a 21-year lease on the theater that extended from August 1919 to August 1940. The brothers believed that the 49th Street site could be as profitable as theaters on 42nd Street, which historically was Times Square's legitimate theatrical hub. The Shuberts built the Ambassador Theatre in 82 days, then a record for theatrical construction. The musical comedy The Rose Girl was announced in January 1921 as the Ambassador's first production, and the theater opened on February 11 with The Rose Girl. Biff, Bang, Bang! was staged that May, followed later the same year by the theater's first true hit: the operetta Blossom Time, which ran for 516 performances.

Generally, the Ambassador largely hosted operettas during the early 1920s, and many of its early productions were not successful. Its initial operettas included Al Goodman and Sigmund Romberg's The Lady in Ermine in 1922, as well as an American version of Eduard Künneke's Caroline the next year featuring Tessa Kosta. The operetta The Dream Girl opened in 1924 with music by Victor Herbert, who had died several months previously. This was followed by a revival of the drama Candida in 1925, as well as William A. Brady and Owen Davis's adaptation of the novel The Great Gatsby in 1926. Laurence Schwab and Frank Mandel signed a two-year lease for the Ambassador in June 1926, with plans to renovate the theater and stage their own plays inside. Subsequently, Queen High ran for 367 performances after its opening in September 1926, and Bartlett Cormack staged The Racket late the next year.

Most of the Ambassador's productions in the late 1920s were flops, revivals, or transfers from other theaters. Among the shows that transferred were the play Little Accident in 1929, as well as Street Scene later the same year. The following decade started with another transfer, the long-running prison drama The Last Mile, in 1930; Blossom Time was revived for a brief run the next year. The theater then showed vaudeville with the premiere of Chamberlain Brown's Scrap Book in 1932. The Ambassador's next hit was Ayn Rand's Night of January 16th, which opened in September 1935. The same year, the Shuberts placed the theater for sale; at the time, they still held a lease on the theater. The new owners insisted on staging only drama, which resulted in many flops in the late 1930s. One exception to this trend was the Abbey Theatre, which staged several plays in repertory during the 1937 season,

=== Intermittent theatrical use, playhouse ===
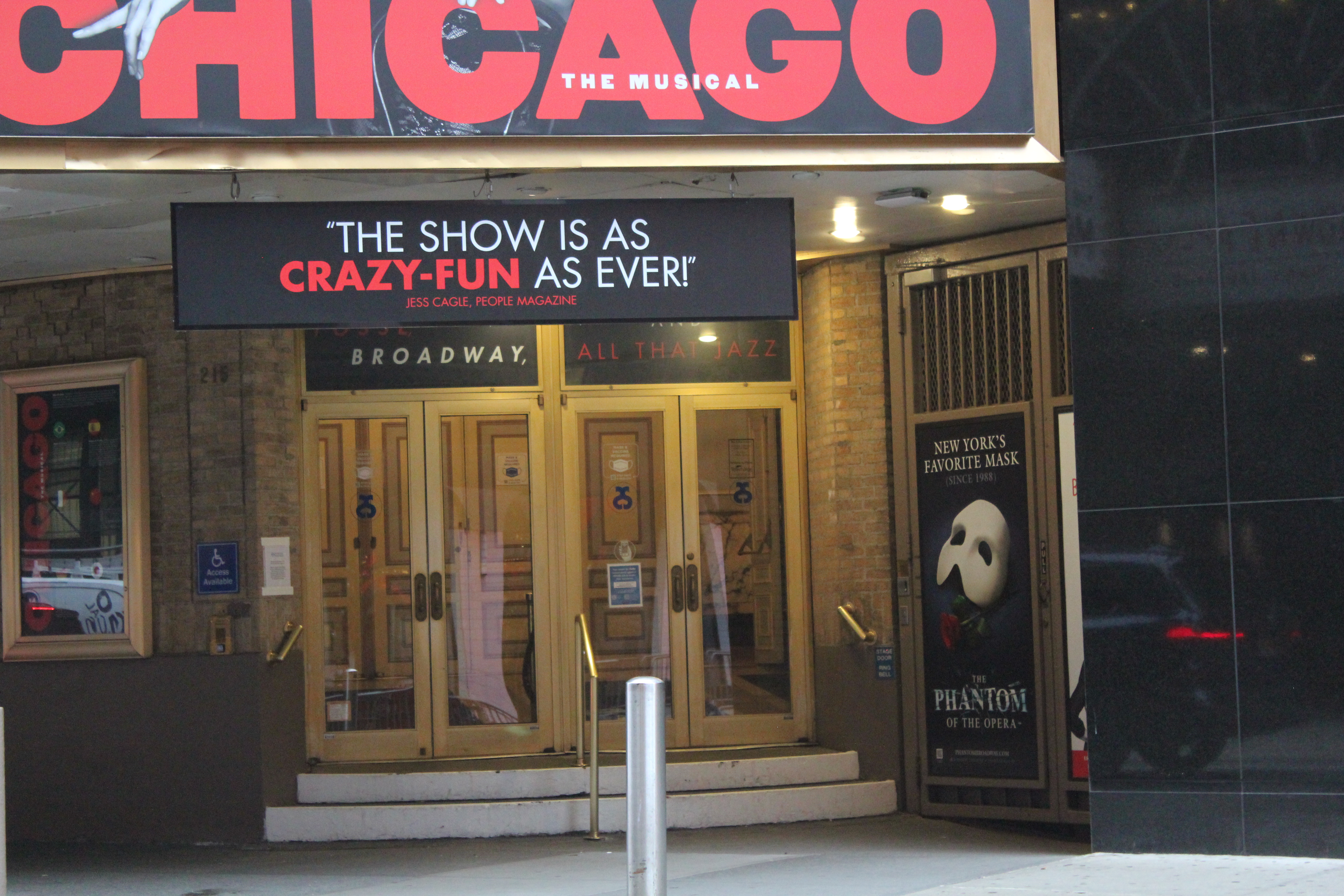
Entrance detail

In December 1938, the Theatrical Realty Corporation, headed by Lee Shubert, leased the Ambassador Theatre to the Columbia Broadcasting System (CBS) for use as a broadcasting studio. CBS enlarged the Ambassador's stage and used it to broadcast orchestra performances in early 1939. Later that year, the 1939 version of The Straw Hat Revue was presented at the Ambassador, while the theater was still being used as a radio broadcast studio. The Shuberts gave up their lease on the theater in September 1940, and the James P. Knight estate took over. That December, the Knights leased the Ambassador to Cummins Pictures Inc. for films. The New York Grand Opera Company performed at the theater in September 1941, and the Ambassador was leased to real-estate operator Irving Maidman two months later. The Ambassador returned to showing legitimate productions that November with Cuckoos on the Hearth, which transferred from the Mansfield Theatre.

Central Hanover Bank & Trust acquired the Ambassador in January 1942 and resold it to J. Arthur Fischer that June in an all-cash transaction. The burlesque revue Wine, Women and Song opened at the theater that September. However, the revue was closed three months later because it was "indecent", namely violating ordinances against obscenities; under the orders of the mayoral administration of Fiorello La Guardia, the Ambassador lost its license to operate as a legitimate theater. The Ambassador's theatrical license was restored in August 1943, just before the opening of a third and final revival of Blossom Time, which ran only 47 performances. This was followed by a set of Gilbert and Sullivan plays in early 1944, as well as transfers of Decision and School For Brides the same year.

The Ambassador was leased to Joseph and Sam Siritzky in August 1945 for film screenings. The Siritzkys' lease was to run for at least five years, with options for extensions. The Ambassador was used as a movie house and as a radio and television studio for the next 11 years. The operators instituted a policy of screening foreign films in November 1946, starting with the French film Carmen. For the next three years, the theater was used exclusively for screening foreign films. The Siritzkys suspended their operations at the Ambassador in mid-1950 and departed to France. That August, DuMont Television Network signed a five-year lease for the Ambassador and immediately began remodeling it for use as a broadcast studio. The wooden stage was resurfaced with a smooth finish of magnesium chloride, and a partitioned control room was added. DuMont opened its studio in September 1950 and used the Ambassador for telecasting.

=== Broadway revival ===
==== 1950s to 1970s ====
In July 1956, the Shuberts announced that they would restore the Ambassador to legitimate-theater use. The comedy The Loud Red Patrick, which opened that October, was the first production at the reopened theater. Generally, the productions of the revived Ambassador were no more successful than those that were staged in the theater's original Broadway run. In 1957, the Ambassador hosted Eugenia with Tallulah Bankhead; a transfer of the long-running The Diary of Anne Frank; and the murder drama Compulsion with Dean Stockwell, Roddy McDowall, and Ina Balin. This was followed in 1958 by a limited run of Back to Methuselah with Faye Emerson and Tyrone Power, as well as Comes a Day with Judith Anderson and George C. Scott (the latter in his Broadway debut). The next year, Jean Dixon, Melvyn Douglas, and E. G. Marshall performed in The Gang's All Here.

The long-running Paddy Chayefsky play The Tenth Man transferred from the Booth Theatre in 1961, ending its two-year run at the Ambassador. Subsequently, the theater hosted A Passage to India and the Joseph Hayes drama Calculated Risk in 1962. Another transfer, Stop the World – I Want to Get Off, was staged at the Ambassador in 1963, followed by Ira Wallach's Absence of a Cello the next year. The Ambassador also hosted limited concert engagements from the Paul Taylor Dance Company and Charles Aznavour in 1965. The theater then hosted The Lion in Winter with Robert Preston and Rosemary Harris in 1966, as well as Robert Anderson's collection of one-act plays, You Know I Can't Hear You When the Water's Running, starting in 1967. The Ambassador ended the decade with runs of Joseph Heller's We Bombed in New Haven in 1968 and Tom Jones and Harvey Schmidt's Celebration in 1969.

The Ambassador hosted various types of productions in the 1970s, ranging from adaptations of children's stories to musical parodies. First was a revival of Sandy Wilson's The Boy Friend, featuring Judy Carne and Sandy Duncan, in 1970. This was followed by Paul Sills' Story Theatre the same year. which played in repertory with Sills's Metamorphoses near the end of its run. The Ambassador also hosted Melvin Van Peebles's musical Ain't Supposed to Die a Natural Death in 1971, as well as a revival of Scapino with Jim Dale in 1974. The Ambassador hosted three solo productions in the mid-1970s: Me and Bessie with Linda Hopkins (1975); I Have a Dream with Billy Dee Williams (1976); and Miss Margarida's Way with Estelle Parsons (1977). The theater's other productions of that decade included Godspell in 1976 and Eubie! in 1978.

==== 1980s to present ====
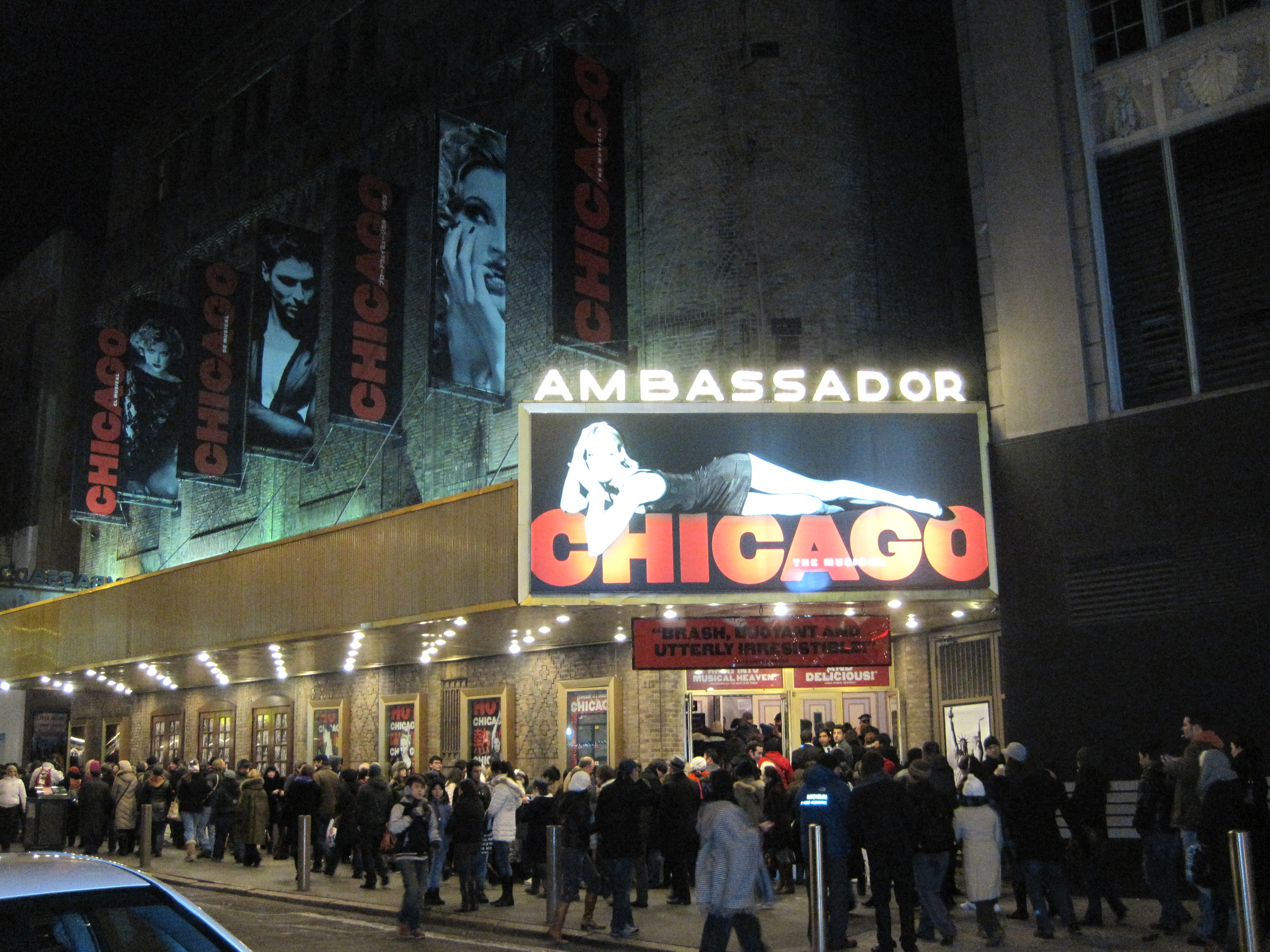
Seen at night in 2010

The theater was briefly known as the New Ambassador Theatre in April 1980, when the production Goodbye Fidel was being performed. The same year, the Ambassador hosted Your Arms Too Short to Box with God, as well as a transfer of the musical Dancin', the latter of which ran through 1982. Afterward, Herman van Veen performed the one-man show All of Him in 1982, and a revival of Arthur Miller's A View from the Bridge was staged in 1983. Ellie Greenwich performed some songs in 1985 as part of her musical Leader of the Pack. Barbara Cook had a limited concert engagement in April 1987, followed the same year by a revival of the musical Dreamgirls. A limited run of Brazilian revue Oba Oba was staged in 1988, followed the same year by a six-month run of Ain't Misbehavin'. The last production of the decade was The Circle in 1989, which featured Stewart Granger, Rex Harrison, and Glynis Johns for 208 performances; The Circle marked Granger's only Broadway appearance and Harrison's last. Also during the 1980s, the Shuberts renovated the Ambassador as part of a restoration program for their Broadway theaters.

The New York City Landmarks Preservation Commission (LPC) had started to consider protecting the Ambassador as a landmark in 1982, with discussions continuing over the next several years. The LPC designated the facades of the Ambassador, Neil Simon, and Virginia (now August Wilson) theaters as landmarks in August 1985, along with the Ambassador's and Neil Simon's interiors, over the objections of the three theaters' owners. The New York City Board of Estimate considered the designations for ratification in December 1985 and approved the designation of the Ambassador's interior, as well as the two other theaters' designations. Though the Ambassador's interior had cultural and architectural significance, the exterior had been designated only for its cultural significance. In a concession to theatrical owners, the Board of Estimate refused to ratify designations of theaters if these were made solely on cultural grounds. The board's vote to refuse landmark status for the Ambassador's facade was a very rare decision; it did not make another revocation until 1989. (Note: This was when landmark status was revoked from the Coogan Building at Sixth Avenue and 26th Street. Prior to those, the Board of Estimate had only ever overturned four landmark designations since 1965, when the LPC gained the authority to designate landmarks.)

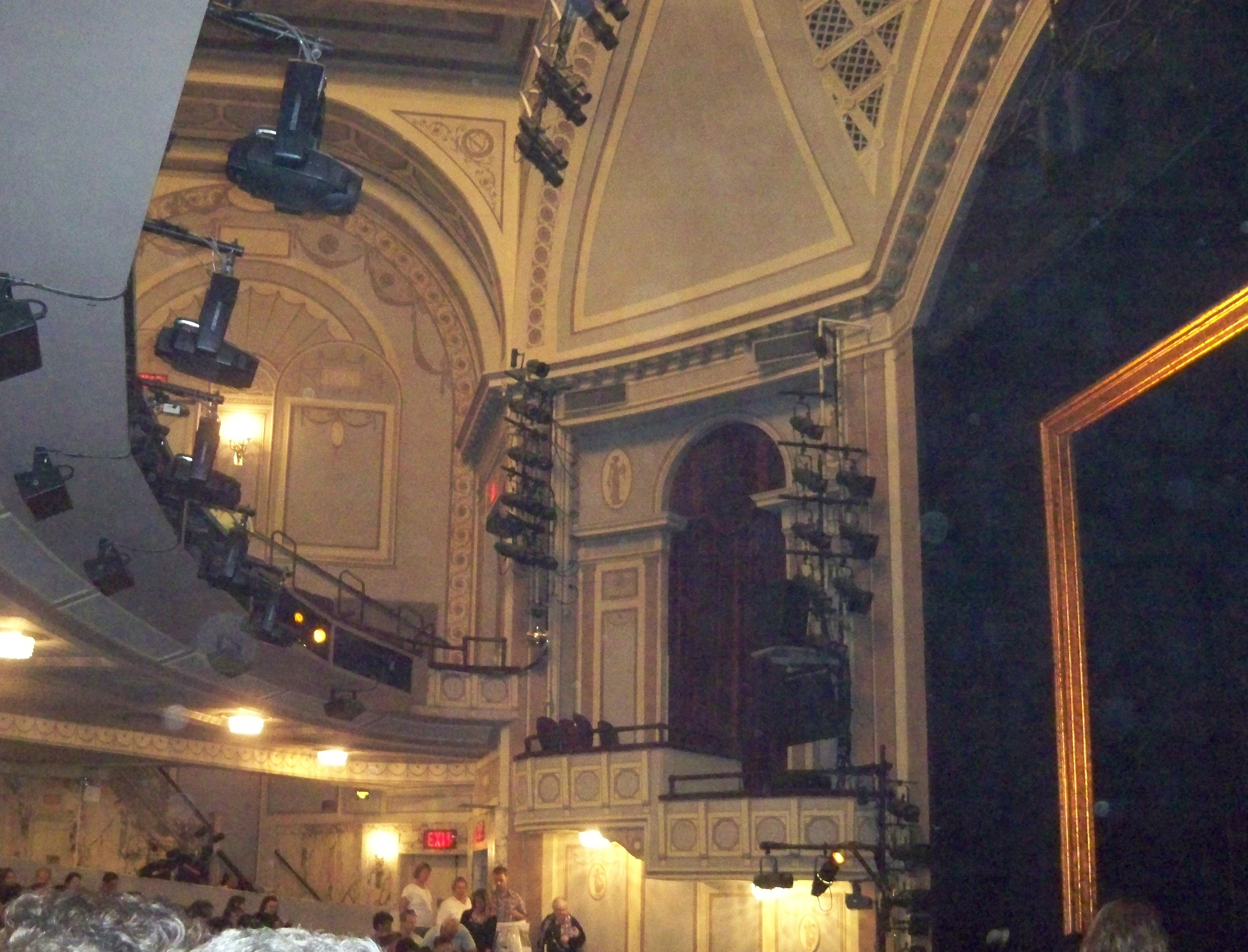
Interior of the auditorium, with the box section at center

After The Circle closed, the Ambassador did not host another legitimate production for five years. After the death of Colleen Dewhurst in 1991, there were calls to rename the Ambassador after her, given Dewhurst's longtime association with playwright Eugene O'Neill's work and the Ambassador's proximity to the O'Neill Theatre. The next production at the Ambassador was comedian Red Buttons's solo Buttons on Broadway, which opened in 1995. This was followed in 1996 by Bring in 'da Noise, Bring in 'da Funk, which opened in 1996 and ran 1,130 performances over the next three years. The Ambassador's last productions of the 1990s were You're a Good Man, Charlie Brown in February 1999 with Kristin Chenoweth and Roger Bart, as well as It Ain't Nothin' But the Blues that September.

Relatively few productions have played the Ambassador since 2000. The first was The Ride Down Mt. Morgan, which was staged in 2000. The next year, the Ambassador hosted A Class Act and Hedda Gabler, the latter of which opened during a downturn in the Broadway industry caused by the September 11 attacks. The play Topdog/Underdog opened at the Ambassador in 2002. This was followed by the musical Chicago, which had already run for several years on Broadway when it transferred to the Ambassador in January 2003. Chicago has played at the Ambassador ever since, becoming the second-longest-running Broadway production in 2014. (Note: After The Phantom of the Opera, which has run at the Majestic Theatre since 1988) As part of a settlement with the United States Department of Justice in 2003, the Shuberts agreed to improve disabled access at their 16 landmarked Broadway theaters, including the Ambassador. The theater closed on March 12, 2020, due to the COVID-19 pandemic. It reopened with performances of Chicago on September 14, 2021. Chicago broke the theater's box-office record several times during its run, most recently during the week ending May 3, 2026, when the musical grossed $1,688,129.

== Notable productions ==
Productions are listed by the year of their first performance. This list only includes Broadway shows; it does not include films screened at the theater, nor does it include shows that were taped there.

Notable productions at the theater
Opening year	Name	Refs.
1921	Blossom Time	
1924	The Dream Girl	
1925	Candida	
1925	The Student Prince	
1926	The Great Gatsby	
1927	The Racket	
1928	The Outsider	
1928	Redemption	
1929	Little Accident	
1929	Street Scene	
1930	The Last Mile	
1930–1931	Six Shakespeare plays	(Note: Namely King Lear, Hamlet, The Merchant of Venice, Macbeth, As You Like It, and Richard III)
1931	Death Takes a Holiday	
1931	Blossom Time	
1933	Young Sinners	
1933	June Moon	
1934	Biography	
1935	Night of January 16th	
1936	Mulatto	
1937	Eight Abbey Theatre plays	(Note: Including Katie Roche, The Plough and the Stars, The Playboy of the Western World, Juno and the Paycock, Drama at Inish)
1938	You Can't Take It with You	
1939	The Straw Hat Revue	
1944	Ten Gilbert and Sullivan plays	(Note: Namely The Mikado, Trial by Jury, H.M.S. Pinafore, Cox and Box, The Pirates of Penzance, The Gondoliers, Iolanthe, Patience, Ruddigore, and The Yeomen of the Guard)
1957	The Diary of Anne Frank	
1957	Compulsion	
1958	Back to Methuselah	
1960	The 49th Cousin	
1961	The Tenth Man	
1961	Blood, Sweat and Stanley Poole	
1962	Something About a Soldier	
1962	A Passage to India	
1963	Stop the World – I Want to Get Off	
1965	The World of Charles Aznavour	
1966	The Lion in Winter	
1966	The Investigation	
1967	You Know I Can't Hear You When the Water's Running	
1968	We Bombed in New Haven	
1969	Celebration	
1970	The Boy Friend	
1970	Paul Sills' Story Theatre	
1971	Ain't Supposed to Die a Natural Death	
1973	Warp!	
1974	Scapino	
1975	We Interrupt This Program...	
1975	Me and Bessie	
1976	Des Journées Entières Dans les Arbres	
1977	Godspell	
1977	Miss Margarida's Way	
1978	Same Time, Next Year	
1978	Eubie!	
1980	Your Arms Too Short to Box with God	
1980	Dancin'	
1982	Herman Van Veen: All of Him	
1983	A View from the Bridge	
1985	Leader of the Pack	
1987	Barbara Cook: A Concert for the Theatre	
1987	Dreamgirls	
1988	Ain't Misbehavin'	
1989	The Circle	
1995	Fool Moon	
1996	Bring in 'da Noise, Bring in 'da Funk	
1999	You're a Good Man, Charlie Brown	
1999	It Ain't Nothin' But the Blues	
2000	The Ride Down Mt. Morgan	
2001	A Class Act	
2001	Hedda Gabler	
2002	Topdog/Underdog	
2003	Chicago	

== See also ==
- List of Broadway theatres
- List of New York City Designated Landmarks in Manhattan from 14th to 59th Streets
