= Estelle Parsons =

American actress (born 1927)

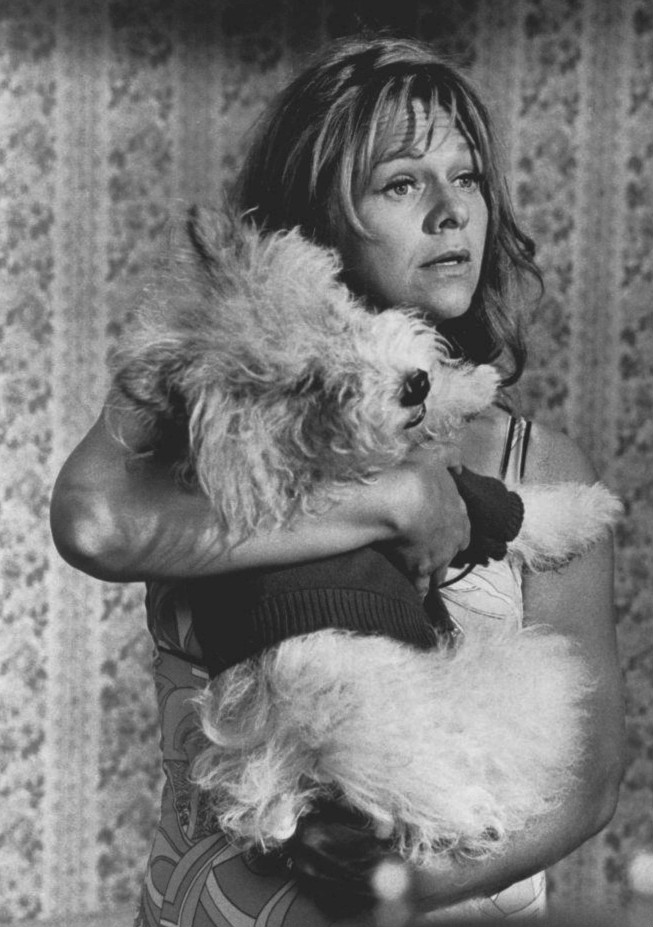
- Parsons in a Love, American Style episode in 1973
- Born: November 20, 1927 (age 99); Lynn, Massachusetts, U.S.
- Education: Connecticut College (BA); Boston University
- Occupation: Actress
- Years active: 1956–present
- Known for: Roseanne; The Conners; Bonnie and Clyde
- Spouses: Richard Gehman (m. 1953; div. 1958) Peter Zimroth (m. 1983; died 2021)
- Children: 3

Estelle Parsons (born November 20, 1927) is an American actress.

After studying law, Parsons became a singer before deciding to pursue a career in acting. She worked for the television program Today and made her stage debut in 1961. During the 1960s, Parsons established her career on Broadway before progressing to film. She won the Academy Award for Best Supporting Actress for Bonnie and Clyde (1967), and was also nominated for her work in Rachel, Rachel (1968).

Parsons worked extensively in film and theatre during the 1970s and later directed several Broadway productions. Later work included perhaps her best known role, as Beverly Harris, mother of the title character, on the sitcom Roseanne, and, later, on its spinoff The Conners. She has been nominated five times for the Tony Award (four times for Lead Actress of a Play and once for Featured Actress). In 2004, Parsons was inducted into the American Theatre Hall of Fame.

== Early life ==
Parsons was born in Lynn Hospital, Lynn, Massachusetts, the younger of two children born to Elinor Ingeborg (née Mattsson), a native of Sweden, and Eben Parsons, who was of English descent. Estelle's older sister, Elaine Parsons Ruggles, was born in 1923 and died in 1996.

She attended Oak Grove School for Girls in Maine. After graduating from Connecticut College in 1949, Parsons initially studied law at Boston University School of Law, and then worked as a singer with a band before settling on an acting career in the early 1950s.

== Career ==
Parsons moved to New York City, and worked as a writer, producer and commentator for The Today Show. She made her Broadway debut in 1956 in the ensemble of the Ethel Merman musical Happy Hunting. Her Off-Broadway debut was in 1961, and she received a Theatre World Award in 1963 for her performance in Whisper into My Good Ear/Mrs. Dally Has a Lover (1962).

In 1964, Parsons won an Obie Award for Best Actress for her performance in two Off-Broadway plays, Next Time I'll Sing to You and In the Summer House. In 1967, she starred with Stacy Keach in the premiere of Joseph Heller's play We Bombed in New Haven at the Yale Repertory Theatre.

Parsons has received Tony Award nominations for her work in The Seven Descents of Myrtle (1968), And Miss Reardon Drinks a Little (1971), Miss Margarida's Way (1978), Morning's at Seven (2002), and The Velocity of Autumn (2014). She played Leokadia Begbick in the American premiere of the Weill–Brecht opera, Rise and Fall of the City of Mahagonny (1970), and performed as Mrs. Peachum to Lotte Lenya's Jenny in Threepenny Opera on tour and in New York City. In 1978 she played Lady Macbeth in the Kauai Community Players production. She also played Ruth in Gilbert & Sullivan's The Pirates of Penzance on Broadway in 1981. From June 17, 2008, through May 17, 2009, she played the role of Violet Weston in August: Osage County. She continued playing the role during the show's national tour beginning July 24, 2009, in Denver.

In 1979, Parsons directed a production of Antony and Cleopatra at Interart Theatre in New York in which she incorporated some Spanish into the show, prompting Joseph Papp to invite her to direct at the New York Shakespeare Festival (now The Public Theater), and becoming the first woman to do so. As a director, Parsons has a number of Broadway credits, including a production of Romeo and Juliet, Macbeth and As You Like It in 1986. Off-Broadway, she directed Dario Fo's Orgasmo Adulto Escapes from the Zoo (1983). She served as the Artistic Director of the Actors Studio for five years, from 1998 to 2003.

In 2016, she starred in Israel Horovitz's new play Out of the Mouths of Babes along with Judith Ivey directed by Barnet Kellman at the Cherry Lane Theater in New York City.

In 2004, Parsons was inducted into the American Theatre Hall of Fame.

Her film career includes an Oscar for Best Supporting Actress for her portrayal of Blanche Barrow in Bonnie and Clyde (1967), and a nomination for Rachel, Rachel (1968). She received a BAFTA Award nomination for her role in Watermelon Man (1970), and appeared in I Never Sang for My Father (1970), Two People (1973), A Memory of Two Mondays (1974), For Pete's Sake (1974), Dick Tracy (1990) and Boys on the Side (1995).

On television, Parsons played the recurring role of Beverly Harris, the mother of the title character on Roseanne; her Beverly character is the daughter of character Nana Mary, played by fellow Academy Award winner Shelley Winters. Other television credits include appearances in The Patty Duke Show, Love, American Style, All in the Family, Archie Bunker's Place, Open Admissions, Frasier, Law & Order: Special Victims Unit, and The Good Wife, as well as The UFO Incident: The Story of Betty and Barney Hill and the PBS production of June Moon. She played the part of Babe in three episodes of the second and fifth seasons of Grace and Frankie.

She was honored with a Woman of Achievement Award from the Women's Project Theater in 2009. In 2010, she appeared in London, playing psychic Helga ten Dorp in Deathtrap at the Noël Coward Theatre in the West End.

Parsons' most recent Broadway appearances include Good People (2011) and Nice Work If You Can Get It (2012).

In April 2018, Parsons returned to television reprising her role as Beverly Harris, mother of Roseanne Barr's title character, in season 10, episode 5 of Roseanne.

== Personal life ==
While co-starring with fellow Academy Award-winning actor Jack Lemmon in a new Ernest Thompson stage play in Los Angeles, Parsons appeared on the November 1, 1983, episode of The Tonight Show, and told Johnny Carson that Lemmon had been her first boyfriend when they were teenagers in the 1940s.

Parsons married author Richard Gehman in 1953. They had twin daughters, reporter Abbie and actress Martha Gehman, before divorcing in 1958. Her grandson Eben Britton, Abbie's son, is a former player for the Chicago Bears and Jacksonville Jaguars as a guard/tackle, and who was named for his great-grandfather, Estelle's father.

In January 1983, she married her partner of 10 years, Peter Zimroth, who had served as Assistant U.S. Attorney, Assistant District Attorney and court-appointed monitor of the NYPD's policies and practices regarding stop-and-frisk. They adopted a son, Abraham, born in February 1983. Peter Zimroth died on November 8, 2021.

In 1976, Parsons was a member of the executive committee of the Writers and Artists for Peace in the Middle East, a pro-Israel group.

== Filmography ==
=== Film ===
Year	Title	Role	Notes
1963	Ladybug Ladybug	JoAnn's Mother	
1967	Bonnie and Clyde	Blanche	Academy Award for Best Supporting Actress; Laurel Award for Top Female Supporting Performance (2nd place)
1968	Rachel, Rachel	Calla Mackie	Laurel Award for Top Female Supporting Performance; Nominated – Academy Award for Best Supporting Actress
1969	Don't Drink the Water	Marion Hollander	
1970	Watermelon Man	Althea Gerber	Nominated – BAFTA Award for Best Actress in a Supporting Role
1970	I Walk the Line	Ellen Haney	
1970	I Never Sang for My Father	Alice	
1973	Two People	Barbara Newman	
1974	For Pete's Sake	Helen Robbins	
1975	Fore Play	1st Lady / Barmaid	
1989	The Lemon Sisters	Mrs. Kupchak	
1990	The Blue Men	May	
1990	Dick Tracy	Mrs. Trueheart	
1995	Boys on the Side	Louise	
1996	Looking for Richard	Margaret	
1997	That Darn Cat	Old Lady McCracken	
2018	Diane	Mary	

=== Television ===
Year	Title	Role	Notes
1954	Today	Self	Episode dated 6 September 1954
1963	The Defenders	Mrs. Martin	"Metamorphosis"
1964	The DuPont Show of the Week	Carrie Bernice	"The Gambling Heart"
1964	The Patty Duke Show	Mrs. Appleton	"The Con Artist"
1965	The Doctors and the Nurses	Mrs. Meyers	"Where There's Smoke"
1966	The Trials of O'Brien	Miss Baines	"Alarums and Excursions"
1968	Snap Judgment	Self	Episode dated 18 November 1968
1968	Hemingway's Spain: A Love Affair	Self (voice only)	
1968	Kraft Music Hall	Self	Episode #11.30
1970	The Front Page	Mollie Malloy	
1970	The David Frost Show	Self	Episode #2.240
1971	Great Performances	Agnes	A Memory of Two Mondays
1972	Love, American Style	Bernice	"Love and the Clinic/Love and the Perfect Wedding/Love and the President/Love and the Return of Raymond"
1972	Medical Center	Bev	"Wall of Silence"
1973	Terror on the Beach	Arlene Glynn	
1974	The Gun and the Pulpit	Sadie Underwood	
1974	Great Performances	Lucille	"June Moon"
1975	The UFO Incident	Betty Hill	
1976	The Tenth Level	Crossland	
1976	NBC Special Treat	Edwina Kemp	"Big Henry and the Polka Dot Kid"
1976	All in the Family	Dolores Mancheney Fencel	"Archie's Secret Passion"
1978	All in the Family	Blanche Hefner	"Reunion on Hauser Street", "Weekend in the Country"
1979	Archie Bunker's Place	Blanche Hefner	"Blanche and Murray"
1979	Backstairs at the White House	Bess Truman	4 episodes
1981	The Gentleman Bandit	Marjorie Seebode	
1981	Guests of the Nation	Kate O'Connell	
1982	Today	Self	Episode dated 14 January 1982
1982	American Playhouse	Mabel Lederer/Angela Motorman	"Come Along with Me"
1987	American Playhouse		"Waiting for the Moon" (the producers wish to thank)
1988	Open Admissions	Clare Block	
1989–1997, 2018	Roseanne	Beverly Harris	61 episodes Nominated for TV Land Award
1990	Everyday Heroes	Matty Jennings	
1992	A Private Matter	Mary Chessen	Nominated—CableACE Award Supporting Actress in a Movie or Miniseries
1993	The American Clock	Older Doris	
1993	Family Feud	Self	"Roseanne vs. Jackie Thomas Sitcoms"
1994	Inside the Actors Studio	Self	
1997	Touched by an Angel	Jeannette Fisher	"Sandcastles"
1998	The Love Letter	Beatrice Corrigan	
1999	Freak City	Mrs. Stanapolous	
2000	Backstory	Self	"Bonnie and Clyde"
2001	100 Centre Street	Esther O'Neill	"The Fix"
2002	Law & Order: Special Victims Unit	Rose Rinato	"Denial"
2004	Frasier	Celeste's Mother (voice); Opal; Herself (photograph)	"Frasier-Lite" "Coots and Ladders" "Goodnight, Seattle"
2004	Strip Search	Roberta Gray	
2004	Happy Birthday Oscar Wilde	Self	
2005	Empire Falls	Bea	2 episodes
2013	The Good Wife	Nana Joe	Episode: "What's in the Box?"
2016–2019	Grace and Frankie	Babe	3 episodes
2018–2024	The Conners	Beverly Harris	10 episodes

=== Stage ===
Year	Title	Role	Notes	Ref.
1956	Happy Hunting	Mary Mills	Majestic Theatre, Broadway	
1958	Whoop-Up	Reservation Resident	Shubert Theatre, Broadway	
1960	Beg, Borrow or Steal	Ollie	Martin Beck Theatre, Broadway	
1961	Whisper Into My Good Ear/ Mrs. Daily Has a Lover	Mrs. Daily	Off-Broadway	
1964	Next Time I'll Sing to You	Lizzie	Off-Broadway	
1964	Ready When You Are, C.B.!	Felicia	Brooks Atkinson Theatre, Broadway	
1966	Malcolm	Madame Rosita/Laureen	Shubert Theatre, Broadway	
1967	We Bombed in New Haven	Performer	Yale Repertory Theatre	
1968	The Seven Descents of Myrtle	Myrtle	Ethel Barrymore Theatre, Broadway	
1969	Peer Gynt	Aase	Delacorte Theater, Off-Broadway	
1970	Rise and Fall of the City of Mahagonny	Leocadia Begbick	Off-Broadway	
1970	Threepenny Opera	Mrs. Peachum	US Tour	
1971	And Miss Reardon Drinks a Little	Catherine Reardon	Morosco Theatre, Broadway	
1973	Barbary Shore	Guinevere	Off-Broadway	
1974	Mert & Phil	Mert	Vivan Beaumont Theater, Broadway	
1977	Ladies at the Alamo	Dede Cooper	Martin Beck Theatre, Broadway	
1978	Miss Margarida's Way	Miss Margarida	Ambassador Theatre, Broadway	
1981	The Pirates of Penzance	Ruth	Uris Theatre, Broadway	
1989	Baby Goya	Goya	McGinn-Cazale Theater, Off-Broadway	
1989	The Unguided Missile	Martha Mitchell	American Place Theater, Off-Broadway	
1990	Miss Margarida's Way	Miss Margarida	Helen Hayes Theater, Broadway Revival	
1992	Shimada	Denny	Broadhurst Theatre, Broadway	
1994	The Shadow Box	Felicity	Circle in the Square Theatre, Broadway	
1996	Grace & Glorie	Grace Stiles	Laura Pels Theater, Off-Broadway	
2000	The Last of the Thorntons	Fannie Mae Gossett	Pershing Square, Off-Broadway	
2002	Morning's at Seven	Cora Swanson	Lyceum Theatre, Broadway	
2005	Harold and Maude	Maude	Paper Mill Playhouse	
2009	August: Osage County	Violet Weston (Replacement)	Imperial Theatre, Broadway, US Tour	
2010	Deathtrap	Helga ten Dorp	Noel Coward Theatre, West End	
2011	Good People	Dottie	Manhattan Theatre Club, Samuel J. Friedman Theatre, Broadway	
2012	Nice Work If You Can Get It	Millicent Winter	Imperial Theatre, Broadway	
2014	The Velocity of Autumn	Alexandra	Booth Theatre, Broadway	
2016	Out of the Mouths of Babes	Evelyn	Cherry Lane Theatre, Off-Broadway	
2019	A Bright Room Called Day	Die Alte	Public Theater, Off-Broadway	
2020	Unknown Soldier	Lucy Anderson	Playwrights Horizons, Off-Broadway	

=== Audio dramas ===
Year	Title	Role	Notes
2023–2024	Around the Sun	Bibi	2 episodes

== Awards and nominations ==
Year	Award	Category	Nominated work	Result
1964	Obie Awards	Obie Award for Distinguished Performance by an Actress	Next Time I'll Sing to You / In the Summer House	Won
1968	Academy Awards	Best Supporting Actress	Bonnie and Clyde	Won
1968	Laurel Awards	Female Supporting Performance	Bonnie and Clyde	Nominated
1969	Academy Awards	Best Supporting Actress	Rachel, Rachel	Nominated
1969	Laurel Awards	Female Supporting Performance	Rachel, Rachel	Won
1969	Tony Awards	Best Actress in a Play	The Seven Descents of Myrtle	Nominated
1971	Tony Awards	Best Actress in a Play	And Miss Reardon Drinks a Little	Nominated
1978	Tony Awards	Best Actress in a Play	Miss Margarida's Way	Nominated
2002	Tony Awards	Best Featured Actress in a Play	Morning's at Seven	Nominated
2014	Tony Awards	Best Actress in a Play	The Velocity of Autumn	Nominated
1971	BAFTA Awards	Best Supporting Actress	Watermelon Man	Nominated
1978	Drama Desk Awards	Unique Theatrical Experience	Miss Margarida's Way	Won
1984	Drama Desk Awards	Unique Theatrical Experience	Orgasmo Adulto Escapes from the Zoo	Nominated
1993	CableACE Awards	Best Supporting Actress in a Movie or Miniseries	A Private Matter	Nominated
1995	Viewers for Quality Television Awards	Best Specialty Player	Roseanne	Nominated
2011	Outer Critics Circle Awards	Best Featured Actress in a Play	Good People	Nominated
2014	Outer Critics Circle Awards	Best Actress in a Play	The Velocity of Autumn	Nominated
2014	Obie Awards	Obie Award for Sustained Excellence of Performance	Lifetime Achievement in Off-Broadway Theatre	Won

Preceded by Arthur Penn	Artistic Director of the Actors Studio; 1998–2003	Succeeded by Vacant (2003–2004); Stephen Lang; Carlin Glynn; Lee Grant
