= Richard Gehman =

American celebrity writer and novelist (1921–1972)

Richard Boyd Gehman (May 21, 1921 – May 13, 1972) was an American author of five novels and 15 nonfiction books, as well as more than 3,000 magazine articles, including over 400 features. Gehman wrote under many different pen names, such as Meghan Richards, Frederick Christian, Martin Scott, Michael Robinson and F. C. Uffelman.

== Biography ==
Gehman attended J. P. McCaskey High School in Lancaster, Pennsylvania and worked on several local daily newspapers before joining the U.S. Army Corps of Engineers in World War II. He served four years as a writer for The Oak Ridge Times in Oak Ridge, Tennessee. After the war he moved to Greenwich Village in New York City and began freelancing for Esquire, Life, Time, Cosmopolitan, Collier's, Argosy, True, Saga, and The Saturday Evening Post. Gehman was an original Contributing Editor at Playboy.

Gehman's circle of friends included many well-known American writers, editors, painters, and actors, including Robert Frost, Joseph Heller, E. B. White, Roger Angell, Jackson Pollock, Diane Arbus, Howard Nemerov, Estelle Parsons, Jerry Lewis, Maurice Zolotow, Charlotte Zolotow, Morton Thompson and Anthony Hecht, among others.

Maurice Zolotow once claimed that Gehman wrote an entire issue of Cosmopolitan using more than a dozen different pen names; the truth is that Gehman wrote two or three of the principal articles for one issue, each under a different name, plus a record review under the name “Meghan Richards,” and possibly one other regular column. In those days Cosmopolitan used a graphic, diagonal cover banner to highlight special features. Cosmopolitan's editors had a mock-up cover made whose banner bore the legend: "The All Richard Gehman Issue."

Mark Evanier describes Gehman as "a prominent author of his day, specializing in celebrity profiles. He often got access to follow stars around for a few weeks so he could interview them extensively and report on what he observed...."

In the early 1960s, Gehman was hired by TV Guide magazine, for which he wrote many articles focused on celebrities. Gehman believed that creative people were often emotionally insecure because of an unhappy childhood, and that those who became celebrities in the entertainment industry sometimes did so because their insecurity motivated them to succeed.

=== Teaching ===
Gehman taught writing at:

- The Iowa Writers' Workshop at the University of Iowa
- New York University
- Columbia University
- Indiana University
- Pennsylvania State University
- Bread Loaf Writer's Conference at Middlebury College.

=== Personal ===
Gehman was descended from the Christian Gehman who arrived in what is now Pennsylvania in 1653. Gehman was the oldest of the four boys born to Martin Gehman, who fought in World War I, and Nellie Boyd. Gehman married five times. His third wife, to whom he was married from 1953 to 1958, was Academy Award-winning actress Estelle Parsons. His fourth wife, Betsy Holland Gehman (d. 2016) a writer, was best known as the author of Twins: Twice the Trouble, Twice the Fun. His fifth wife, Marianne, was his high school sweetheart.

Gehman fathered at least nine children, including Scott (d. 1981); writer Christian Gehman and brother, college professor, Robinson Gehman; Martha Gehman, an actor; her twin sister, Abbie Britton, a boutique owner; burlesque entrepreneur Pleasant Gehman; computer systems engineer Charles Gehman (d. 2020); Marian theologian Meghan Gehman; and White House food historian Eddie Gehman Kohan. Gehman's grandson with Estelle Parsons played professional football: Eben Britton.

His last years were spent in Lancaster, Pa, where he died on May 13, 1972, nine days short of what would have been his 51st birthday.

== Literary works ==
Along with several other bon vivants, Gehman was a "shadow member" of "The Rat Pack." Gehman appeared as himself in the Jerry Lewis movie The Patsy.

=== Selected works ===
- Sardi's: The Story of a Famous Restaurant (1953)
- A Murder in Paradise (1954)
- Eddie Condon's Treasury of Jazz (with Eddie Condon) (1957)
- How to Write and Sell Magazine Articles (1959)
- Let My Heart be Broken: With the Things that Break the Heart of God (1960)
- The Best From Cosmopolitan (editor) (1961)
- Sinatra and his Rat Pack (1961)
- The Tall American: The Story of Gary Cooper (1963)
- That Kid: The Story of Jerry Lewis (1964)
- Bogart: An Intimate Biography (1965)
- A Hell of a Life with Harry Richman (1966)
- The Haphazard Gourmet (1966)
- The Sausage Book (1969)
- The Day of the Locust by Nathaniel West - introduction to Modern Library Edition (1950)
- In The Soup, In A Stew (unpublished)
- Playboy's Playboy: An Intimate Biography of Hugh Hefner (unpublished)

=== Novels ===
- A Party at the Buchanan Club (1950)
- Each Life to Live (1952)
- The Slander of Witches (1955)
- Driven (1954) Gold Medal D 387
- The Had (1966)

=== Musical Comedy ===
- By Hex (1956) (with Howard Blankman and John Rengier)
