= Martha Gehman =

American actress (born 1955)

- Born: 1955 (age 70–71)
- Occupations: Actress, acting coach
- Years active: 1984–2015

Martha Gehman (born 1955) is an American actress and acting coach. She played the role of Ophelia in the 1985 cult classic The Legend of Billie Jean.

She also had supporting roles in The Flamingo Kid, F/X, Threesome and A Kiss Before Dying.

Gehman has a twin sister, Abbie, and is the daughter of actress Estelle Parsons and Richard Gehman. Her nephew is football player Eben Britton.

She is a co-artistic director of the Actors Studio in New York.

== Filmography ==
=== Film ===
Year	Title	Role	Notes
1984	The Flamingo Kid	Nikki Willis	
1985	The Legend of Billie Jean	Ophelia	
1986	F/X	Andy	
1988	The Appointments of Dennis Jennings	Lisa	Short film
1991	A Kiss Before Dying	Patricia Farren	
1991	Father of the Bride	Andrea	
1994	Threesome	Renay	
1994	Unveiled	Ellen Morrow	
1996	Scorpion Spring	Jo	
1997	Mr. Jealousy	Josselyn	
1997	Walking to Waldheim	Zelda Sher	Short film
1998	Practical Magic	Patty	
1999	Trafficking	Carmella	
2004	Y.M.I.	Forever	
2005	Going Shopping	Melanie	
2011	Broken	Karen Sanders (voice)	Short film

=== Television ===
Year	Title	Role	Notes
1984	CBS Schoolbreak Special	Izzy Otis	Episode: "The Alfred G. Graebner Memorial High School of Rules and Regulations"
1987	Spenser: For Hire	Louanne	Episode: "Gone Fishin'"
1991	Sunday Dinner	Vicky Benedict	Regular role (5 episodes)
1991	Murphy Brown	Secretary #47	Episode: "Inside Murphy Brown"
1994	The Nanny	Betty	Episode: "A Star Is Unborn"
1996	Days of Our Lives	Michelle Bernard	TV series
1997	Boston Common	Molly	Episode: "Soup to Nuts"
