= Harvey Keitel =

American actor (born 1939)

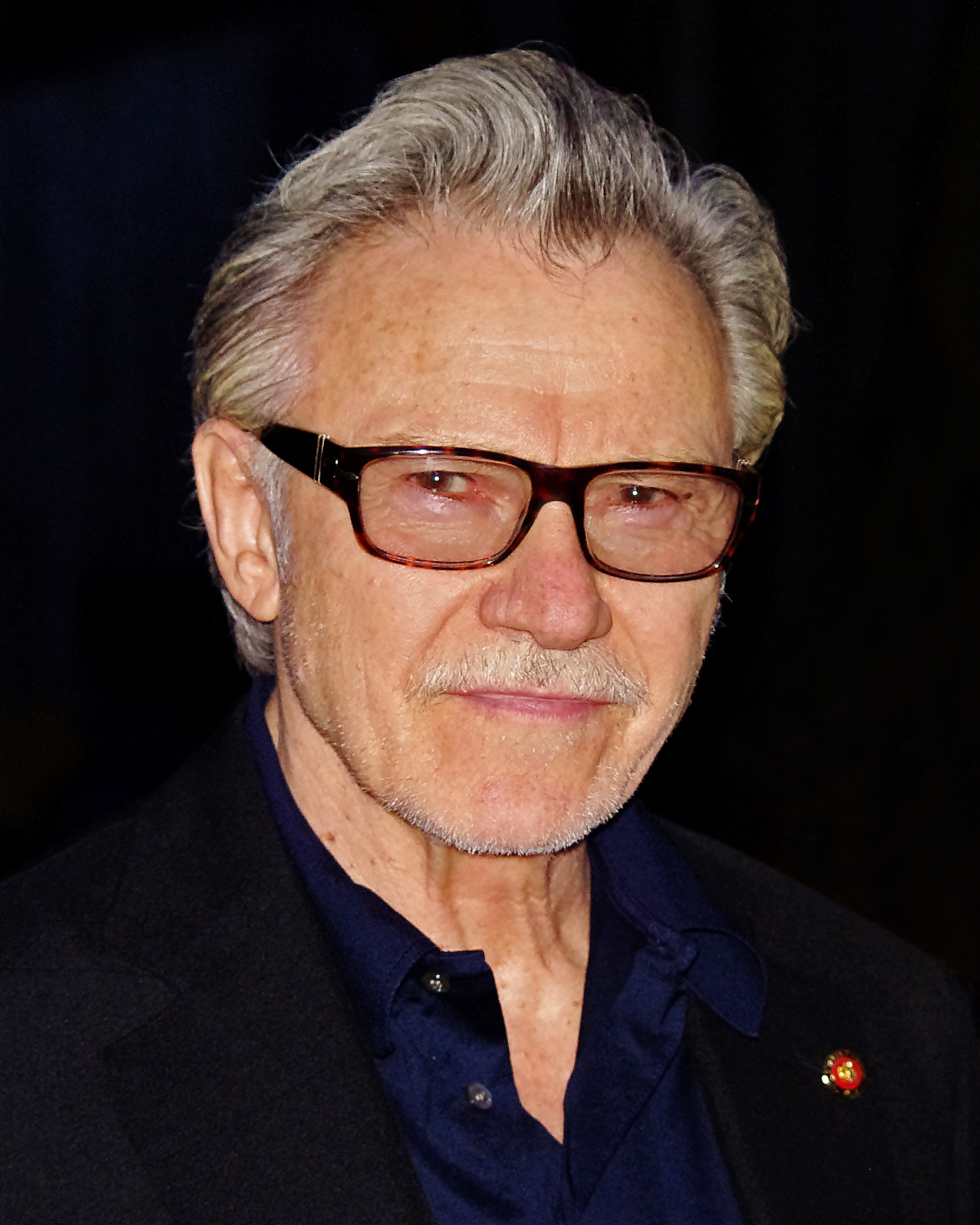
- Keitel in 2012
- Born: Harvey Johannes Keitel; May 13, 1939 (age 87); New York City, U.S.
- Occupations: Actor; producer
- Years active: 1966–present
- Spouse: Daphna Kastner (m. 2001)
- Partner(s): Lorraine Bracco (1982–1993)
- Children: 3

Harvey Johannes Keitel (/kaɪˈtɛl/ ky-TEL; born May 13, 1939) is an American actor and producer. Known for his portrayal of morally ambiguous and "tough guy" characters, he rose to prominence during the New Hollywood movement.

Keitel has long been associated with Martin Scorsese, starring in six Scorsese films: Who's That Knocking at My Door (1967), Mean Streets (1973), Alice Doesn't Live Here Anymore (1974), Taxi Driver (1976), The Last Temptation of Christ (1988), and The Irishman (2019). He is also known for his roles in the Quentin Tarantino films Reservoir Dogs (1992) and Pulp Fiction (1994) and the Wes Anderson films Moonrise Kingdom (2012), The Grand Budapest Hotel (2014), and Isle of Dogs (2018).

Keitel's role as Mickey Cohen in Bugsy (1991) earned him a nomination for the Academy Award for Best Supporting Actor, and The Piano (1993) won him the AACTA Award for Best Actor in a Leading Role. Other notable films include Blue Collar (1978), Thelma & Louise (1991), Bad Lieutenant (1992), Sister Act (1992), Imaginary Crimes (1994), From Dusk till Dawn (1996), Cop Land (1997), Holy Smoke! (1998), U-571 (2000), Red Dragon (2002), National Treasure (2004), National Treasure: Book of Secrets (2007), and Youth (2015).

Keitel was one of the co-presidents of the Actors Studio from 1995 to 2017.

== Early life ==
Harvey Johannes Keitel was born in the Brooklyn borough of New York City on May 13, 1939, the son of Jewish immigrants Miriam (née Klein; 1911–1987) and Harry Keitel (1904–2000). His mother was Romanian and his father was Polish. His parents owned and ran a luncheonette, and his father also worked as a hat maker. He grew up with his older sister Renee and older brother Jerry in Brooklyn's Brighton Beach neighborhood. He attended Abraham Lincoln High School and enlisted in the U.S. Marines at age 16. After his discharge, he worked as a court stenographer for 10 years.

== Career ==
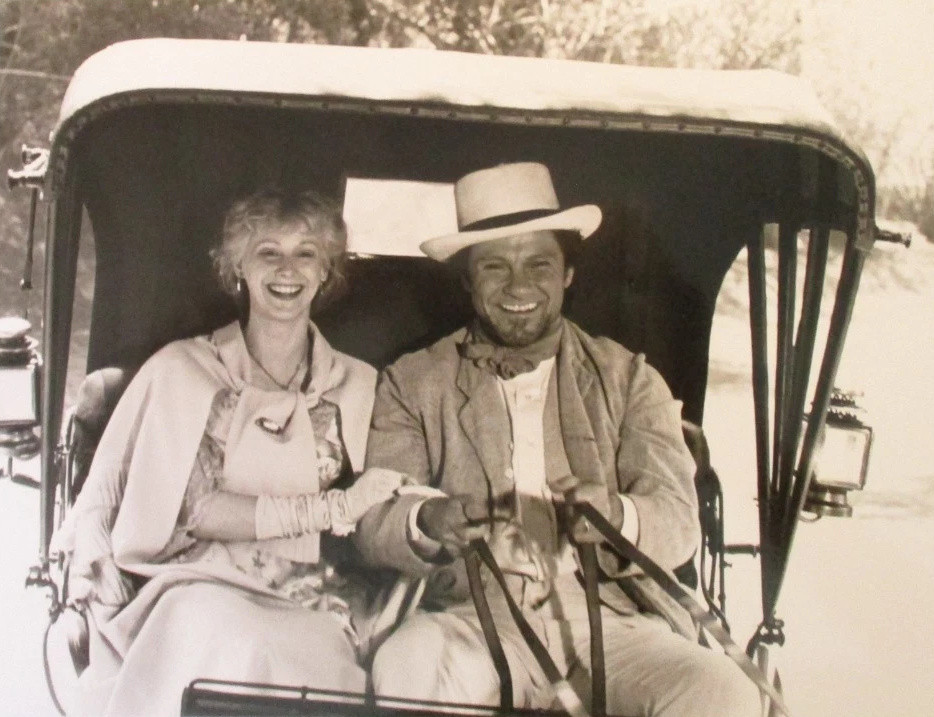
Keitel and Sondra Locke in Amazing Stories (1985)

Keitel studied under both Stella Adler and Lee Strasberg and at the HB Studio, eventually landing roles in some Off-Broadway productions. During this time, Keitel auditioned for filmmaker Martin Scorsese and gained a starring role as "J.R.", in Scorsese's first feature film, Who's That Knocking at My Door (1967). Since then, Scorsese and Keitel have worked together on several projects. Keitel had the starring role in Scorsese's Mean Streets (1973), which also proved to be Robert De Niro's breakthrough film. Keitel re-teamed with Scorsese for Alice Doesn't Live Here Anymore (1974), in which he had a villainous supporting role, and appeared with Robert De Niro again in Scorsese's Taxi Driver (1976), playing the role of Jodie Foster's character's pimp. Between these movies, he portrayed Bugsy Siegel in the 1974 TV movie Virginia Hill starring Dyan Cannon.

In 1977 and 1978, Keitel starred in the directorial debuts of Paul Schrader (Blue Collar, co-starring Richard Pryor and Yaphet Kotto), Ridley Scott (The Duellists, co-starring Keith Carradine), and James Toback (Fingers, in which Keitel played a street hood with aspirations of being a pianist – a role Toback wrote for Robert De Niro to play). He was cast as Captain Willard in Francis Ford Coppola's Apocalypse Now (1979). Keitel was involved with the first week of principal photography in the Philippines. Coppola was not happy with Keitel's take on Willard, stating that the actor "found it difficult to play him as a passive onlooker". After viewing the first week's footage, Coppola replaced Keitel with Martin Sheen.

Keitel continued to do work on both stage and screen in the 1980s, often in the stereotypical role of a thug. Keitel played a corrupt police officer in the 1983 thriller Copkiller (co-starring musician John Lydon), then in the romantic drama Falling in Love (1984). From 1985 to 1988, he appearied in 16 films and telefilms, including Brian De Palma's mobster comedy Wise Guys (1986) and as Judas in Martin Scorsese's The Last Temptation of Christ (1988).

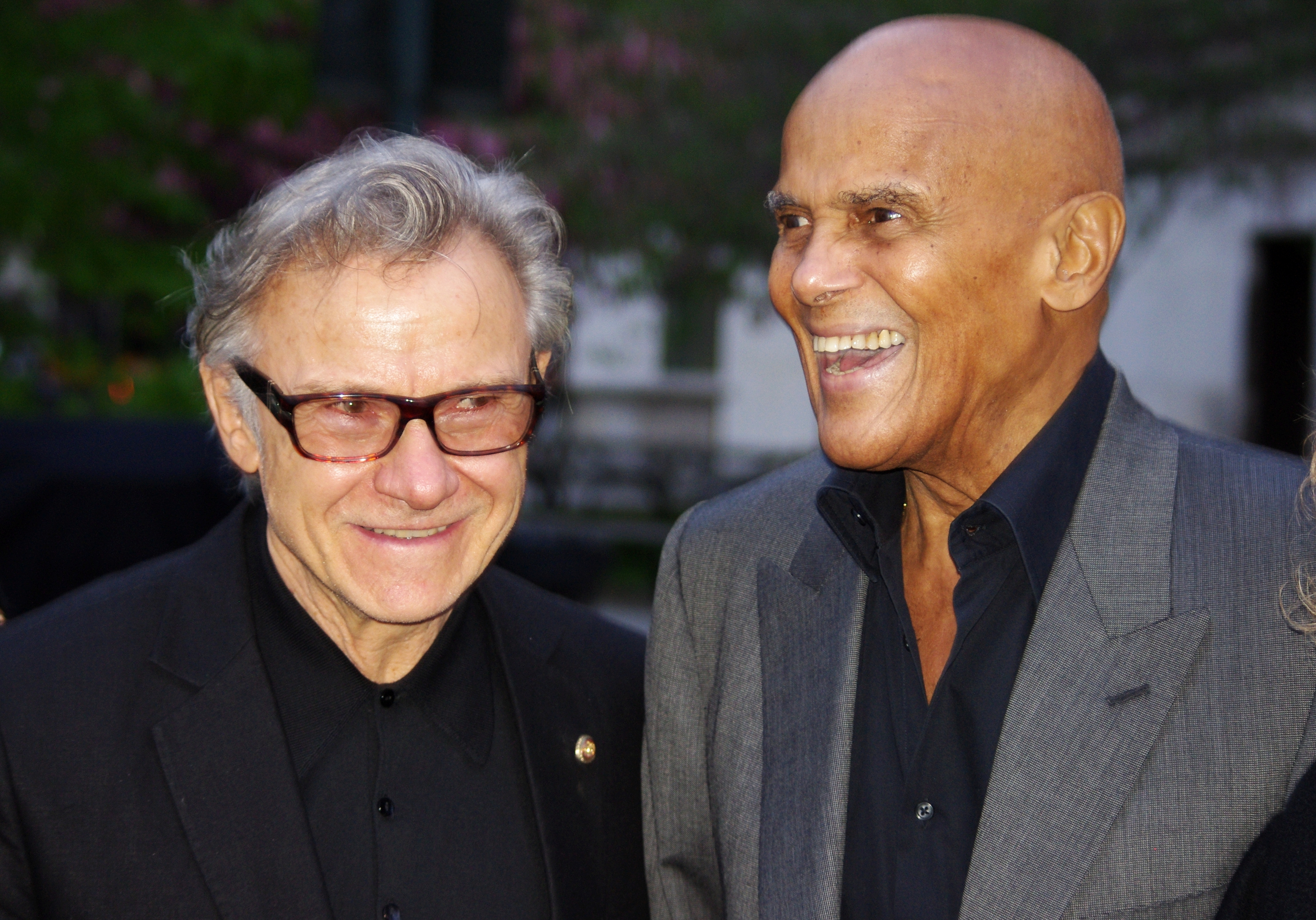
Keitel and Harry Belafonte in 2011

Keitel co-starred with Jack Nicholson in the Chinatown sequel The Two Jakes (1990), directed by Nicholson. Ridley Scott cast Keitel as the sympathetic policeman in Thelma & Louise in 1991; that same year, Keitel landed a role in Barry Levinson's Bugsy, for which he received an Academy Award nomination for Best Supporting Actor. The following year, Keitel played another mobster in the Whoopi Goldberg-starring comedy Sister Act.

Keitel starred in Quentin Tarantino's Reservoir Dogs (which he co-produced) in 1992, where his performance as Mr. White took his career to a different level. Since then, Keitel has chosen his roles with care, seeking to change his image and show a broader acting range. One of these roles was the title character in Bad Lieutenant, about a self-loathing, drug-addicted police lieutenant trying to redeem himself. He co-starred in the Jane Campion film The Piano in 1993 and played Winston "The Wolf" Wolf in Quentin Tarantino's Pulp Fiction, an apparent reprise of his Victor the Cleaner character from 1993's Point of No Return. Keitel starred as a police detective in Spike Lee's Clockers (an adaptation of Richard Price's novel, co-produced by Martin Scorsese). In 1996, Keitel had a major role in Quentin Tarantino and Robert Rodriguez's film From Dusk till Dawn, and in 1997, he starred in Cop Land.

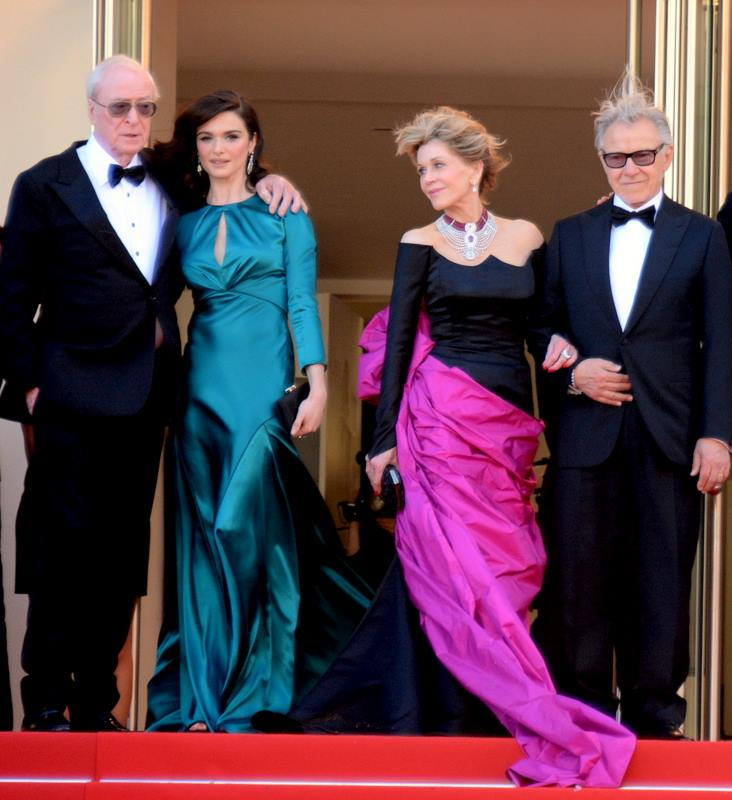
Michael Caine, Rachel Weisz, Jane Fonda, and Keitel at the 2015 Cannes Film Festival

Keitel's later roles include the fatherly Satan in Little Nicky, a wise Navy man in U-571, diligent FBI Special agent Sadusky in National Treasure and the latter's sequel National Treasure: Book of Secrets. In 1999, Keitel was replaced by Sydney Pollack on the set of Stanley Kubrick's Eyes Wide Shut as he quit after doing 68 takes for a scene of his character walking through the door, and he appeared in Tony Bui's Three Seasons (which Keitel also executive produced). Keitel also re-teamed with Jane Campion for Holy Smoke!.

In 2001, Keitel played a U.S. Army denazification investigator in the film Taking Sides and an SS-Oberscharführer Erich Muhsfeldt in the film The Grey Zone. In 2002, at the 24th Moscow International Film Festival, Keitel was honored with the Stanislavsky Award for his outstanding achievement in the career of acting and devotion to the principles of Stanislavsky's school. He also appeared in the Steinlager Pure commercials in New Zealand in 2007.

In 2008, Keitel played Jerry Springer in the New York City premiere of Jerry Springer: The Opera at Carnegie Hall. Keitel then played the role of Detective Gene Hunt in the U.S. remake of the successful British time-travel police drama series Life on Mars. In 2009, he made an appearance in the Jay-Z video for "D.O.A. (Death of Auto-Tune)". In 2013, he appeared in a music video for "Pretty Hurts" by Beyoncé. In 2013, he starred in the independent film A Farewell to Fools.

From 2014 to early 2020, he reprised his role of Winston Wolf from Pulp Fiction as part of a £40 million television advertising campaign for British insurance company Direct Line. In 2021, he received a Lifetime Achievement Award from the Newport Beach Film Festival. In 2022, Keitel starred in Steven Brand's noir thriller Joe Baby. Keitel collaborated with Wes Anderson acting in minor roles in his films Moonrise Kingdom (2012), The Grand Budapest Hotel (2014), and Isle of Dogs (2018). He reunited with Martin Scorsese after 30 years appearing as Philadelphia crime family acting boss Angelo Bruno in his gangster movie The Irishman (2019). He reprised his role FBI Agent Peter Sadusky in the series National Treasure: Edge of History (2022).

== Personal life ==
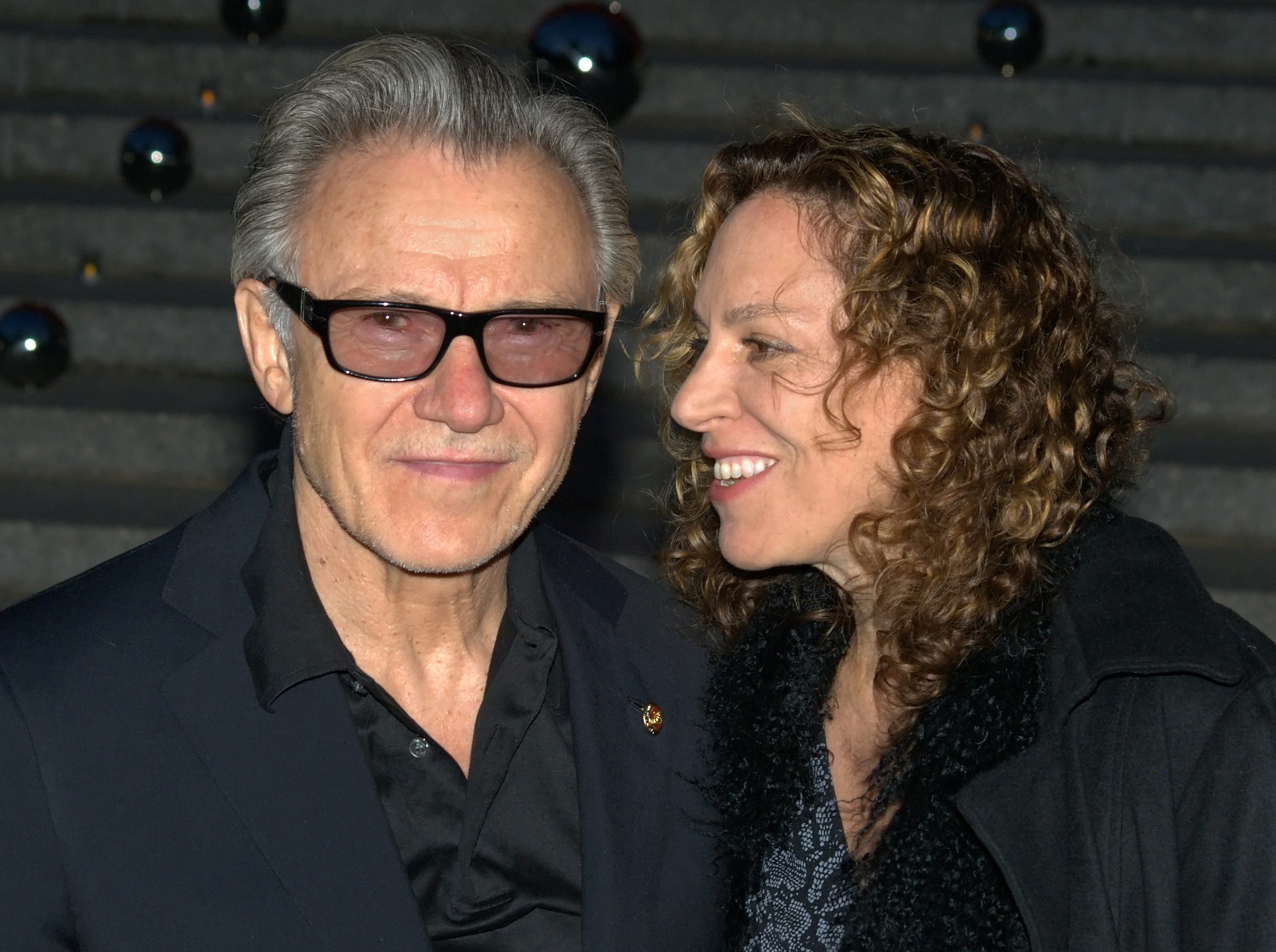
Keitel and Daphna Kastner in 2010

From 1982 to 1993, Keitel was in a relationship with American actress Lorraine Bracco, which ended acrimoniously and triggered a prolonged custody battle over their daughter Stella (born 1985). He dated American potter Lisa Marie Karmazin from 2000 to 2001.. They have a son named Hudson (born 2001), with whom Keitel does not have any relationship. Karmazin took Keitel to court for child support, and he settled in 2004.

Keitel reconnected with Canadian actress Daphna Kastner at the Toronto Film Festival in September 2001, having gone on a date with her in the 1980s. They married three weeks later in Jerusalem. Their son, Roman (born 2004), is also an actor.

In July 2017, Keitel became an honorary citizen of Romania's Maramureș County.

== Filmography ==
=== Film ===
Year	Title	Role	Notes
1967	Reflections in a Golden Eye	Soldier	uncredited
1967	Who's That Knocking at My Door	J.R.	
1970	Street Scenes 1970	Himself	documentary
1970	Brewster McCloud	The Photographer	uncredited
1973	Mean Streets	Charlie Cappa	
1974	Alice Doesn't Live Here Anymore	Ben	
1975	That's the Way of the World	Coleman Buckmaster	
1976	Taxi Driver	Charles "Sport" Rain / Matthew Higgins	
1976	Mother, Jugs & Speed	Tony "Speed" Malatesta	
1976	Buffalo Bill and the Indians	Ed Goodman	
1976	Welcome to L.A.	Ken Hood	
1977	The Duellists	Feraud	
1978	Blue Collar	Jerry Bartowski	
1978	Fingers	Jimmy "Fingers"	
1979	Eagle's Wing	Henry	
1980	Death Watch	Roddy	
1980	Saturn 3	Captain Benson	voice dubbed by Roy Dotrice
1980	Bad Timing	Inspector Netusil	
1982	The Border	"Cat"	
1982	That Night in Varennes	Thomas Paine	
1983	Copkiller	Lieutenant Fred O'Connor	
1983	Exposed	Rivas	
1983	Une pierre dans la bouche	Tony	
1984	Falling in Love	Ed Lasky	
1984	Nemo	Mr. Legend	
1985	Camorra	Frankie	
1985	The Knight of the Dragon	Clever	
1986	Off Beat	Mickey	
1986	Wise Guys	Bobby DiLea	
1986	The Men's Club	Solly Berliner	
1987	The Inquiry	Pontius Pilate	
1987	Blindside	Penfield Gruber	
1987	The Pick-up Artist	Alonzo Scolara	
1988	The Last Temptation of Christ	Judas Iscariot	
1988	Dear Gorbachev	Nikolaj Bucharin	
1989	The January Man	Police Commissioner Frank Starkey	
1990	Two Evil Eyes	Roderick Usher	segment: "The Black Cat"
1990	The Two Jakes	Julius "Jake" Berman	
1990	Grandi cacciatori	Thomas	
1991	Mortal Thoughts	Detective John Woods	
1991	Thelma & Louise	Detective Hal Slocumb	
1991	Bugsy	Mickey Cohen	
1992	Reservoir Dogs	Larry Dimmick / Mr. White	also co-producer
1992	Bad Lieutenant	The Lieutenant	
1992	Sister Act	Vince LaRocca	
1993	Point of No Return	Victor, The Cleaner	
1993	The Piano	George Baines	
1993	Rising Sun	Lieutenant Tom Graham	
1993	Dangerous Game	Eddie Israel	
1993	The Young Americans	DEA Agent John Harris	
1994	Monkey Trouble	Azro	
1994	Pulp Fiction	Winston "The Wolf" Wolf	
1994	Somebody to Love	Harry Harrelson	
1994	Imaginary Crimes	Ray Weiler	
1995	Smoke	Augustus "Auggie" Wren	
1995	Blue in the Face	Augustus "Auggie" Wren	also executive producer
1995	Ulysses' Gaze	A.	
1995	Clockers	Detective Rocco Klein	
1995	Get Shorty	Himself	uncredited cameo
1996	From Dusk till Dawn	Jacob Fuller	
1996	Head Above Water	George	
1997	City of Industry	Roy Egan	
1997	Cop Land	Ray Donlan	
1997	FairyTale: A True Story	Harry Houdini	
1998	Shadrach	Vernon	
1998	Lulu on the Bridge	Izzy Maurer	
1998	Finding Graceland	Elvis	
1998	Sweets of Roses	Hubie	voice
1998	Gunslinger's Revenge	Johnny Lowen	
1999	Three Seasons	James Hager	also executive producer
1999	Holy Smoke!	P.J. Waters	
1999	Presence of Mind	The Master	
2000	U-571	CPO Henry Klough	
2000	Prince of Central Park	The Guardian	
2000	Little Nicky	Satan	
2000	Viper	Leone	voiced dubbed by Giancarlo Giannini
2001	Nailed	Tony Romano	
2001	The Grey Zone	SS-Oberscharführer Erich Muhsfeldt	also executive producer
2001	Taking Sides	Major Steve Arnold	
2002	Ginostra	Matt Benson	
2002	Red Dragon	FBI Agent Jack Crawford	
2002	Beeper	Zolo	
2003	Crime Spree	Frankie Zammeti	
2003	The Galíndez File	Edward Robards	
2003	Who Killed the Idea?	Private Investigator	short film
2003	Dreaming of Julia	"Che"	also producer
2003	Chasing the Elephant	The Mystery Man	short film
2004	Puerto Vallarta Squeeze	Walter McGrane	
2004	National Treasure	FBI Agent Peter Sadusky	
2004	The Bridge of San Luis Rey	Uncle Pio	
2005	Be Cool	Nick Carr	
2005	Shadows in the Sun	Weldon Parish	
2006	One Last Dance	Terrtano	
2006	A Crime	Roger Culkin	
2006	The Stone Merchant	The Merchant Ludovico Vicedomini	
2006	Arthur and the Minimoys	Miro	voice
2007	My Sexiest Year	Zowie	
2007	National Treasure: Book of Secrets	FBI Agent Peter Sadusky	
2009	Inglourious Basterds	Allied Commanding Officer	uncredited voice
2009	The Ministers	Detective Joe Bruno	
2009	Wrong Turn at Tahoe	Nino	
2010	A Beginner's Guide to Endings	Duke White	
2010	Little Fockers	Randy Weir	
2010	The Last Godfather	Don Carini	
2012	Moonrise Kingdom	Commander Pierce	
2013	A Farewell to Fools	Father Johanis	
2013	The Power Inside	O'Mansky	
2013	The Congress	Al	
2014	Two Men in Town	Bill Agati	
2014	The Grand Budapest Hotel	Ludwig	
2014	Rio, I Love You	Himself	segment: "O Milagre"
2014	By the Gun	Salvatore Vitaglia	
2014	Gandhi of the Month	Edward Baker	
2015	Youth	Mick Boyle	
2015	Outlaws	The Director	short film
2015	The Ridiculous 6	"Smiley" Harris	
2016	Chosen	Papi	
2016	The Comedian	Mac Schiltz	
2017	Madame	Bob Fredericks	
2017	Lies We Tell	Demi	
2018	First We Take Brooklyn	Anatoly	
2018	Isle of Dogs	Gondo	voice
2019	The Last Man	Noe	
2019	Esau	Abraham	
2019	See You Soon	Billy	
2019	The Painted Bird	Priest	
2019	The Irishman	Angelo Bruno	
2020	Fatima	Professor Nichols	
2021	Blood on the Crown	General Hunter Blair	
2021	Lansky	Meyer Lansky	
2022	The Baker	Merchant	
2023	Paradox Effect	Silvio	
2024	Joe Baby	Randall Kane	
2024	Spread	Frank	
2024	Laws of Man	Cassidy Whittaker	
2025	The Wrecker	Dante	
2025	Milarepa	Marpa	
2025	The Letter	Finn O'Brien	
2026	Hellfire	Jeremiah	
2026	Kill Code	Eion	
TBA	Minute Mark †		post-production
TBA	Pawn Shop †		filming

Key
†	Denotes films that have not yet been released

=== Television ===
Year	Film	Role	Notes
1966	Hogan's Heroes	German Soldier	uncredited episode: "The Great Impersonation"
1966	Dark Shadows	Blue Whale customer	uncredited 2 episodes
1968	N.Y.P.D.	Ramby	episode: "Case of the Shady Lady"
1971	Great Performances	Jerry	episode: "A Memory of Two Mondays"
1973	Kojak	Jerry Talaba	episode: "Siege of Terror"
1974	The F.B.I.	Ernie	episode: "Deadly Ambition"
1974	A Memory of Two Mondays	Jerry	television film
1974	Virginia Hill	Bugsy Siegel	television film
1984	La bella Otero	Ernest Jurgens	television film
1985	Amazing Stories	Byron Sullivan	episode: "Vanessa in the Garden"
1986	The Ellen Burstyn Show	Frank Tanner	episode: "Reading Between the Lines"
1988	The Play on One	Carl	episode: "Down Where the Buffalo Go"
1989	This Ain't Bebop		television short
1993	Saturday Night Live	himself (host)	episode: "Harvey Keitel/Madonna"
2000	Fail Safe	Brigadier General Warren A. Black	television film
2002	Saturday Night Live	Siegfried	episode: "Robert De Niro/Norah Jones"
2006	The Path to 9/11	John O'Neill	2 episodes
2008-2009	Life on Mars	Lieutenant Gene Hunt	17 episodes
2012	Fatal Honeymoon	Tommy Thomas	television film
2016	Inside Amy Schumer	Proposition Man	episode: "Fame"
2022	Mike	Cus D'Amato	2 episodes
2022	National Treasure: Edge of History	FBI Agent Peter Sadusky	episode: "I'm a Ghost"
2024	The Tattooist of Auschwitz	Older Lale Sokolov	6 episodes

=== Theatre ===
Year	Title	Role	Notes
1975	Death of a Salesman	Happy	Circle in the Square, Broadway
1984	Hurlyburly	Phil	Goodman Theatre, Chicago
1984-1985	Hurlyburly	Phil	Ethel Barrymore Theatre, Broadway
1985	A Lie of the Mind	Jake	McGinn/Cazale Theatre, Off-Broadway
1986	Goose and Tomtom	Bingo	Lincoln Center, New York
2008	Jerry Springer: The Opera	Jerry Springer	Carnegie Hall Playhouse, New York

== Awards and nominations ==
Year	Award	Category	Nominated work	Result
1973	National Society of Film Critics Award	Best Supporting Actor	Mean Streets	Nominated
1976	National Society of Film Critics Award	Best Supporting Actor	Taxi Driver	2nd place
1976	New York Film Critics Circle Awards	Best Supporting Actor	Taxi Driver	2nd place
1991	National Society of Film Critics Award	Best Supporting Actor	Mortal Thoughts	Won
1991	National Society of Film Critics Award	Best Supporting Actor	Thelma & Louise	Won
1991	Academy Award	Best Supporting Actor	Bugsy	Nominated
1991	Golden Globe Award	Best Supporting Actor - Motion Picture	Bugsy	Nominated
1991	Chicago Film Critics Association	Best Supporting Actor	Bugsy	Won
1991	National Society of Film Critics Award	Best Supporting Actor	Bugsy	Won
1992	Sant Jordi Award	Best Foreign Actor	Reservoir Dogs	Won
1992	Independent Spirit Award	Best Male Lead	Bad Lieutenant	Won
1992	New York Film Critics Circle	Best Actor	Bad Lieutenant	2nd place
1993	Australian Film Institute Award	Best Actor in a Leading Role	The Piano	Won
1993	Venice Film Festival	Best Actor	Dangerous Game	Won
1995	Berlin International Film Festival	Silver Bear – Special Jury Prize	Smoke	Won
1995	David di Donatello	Best Foreign Actor	Smoke	Won
1996	Saturn Award	Best Supporting Actor	From Dusk till Dawn	Nominated
2000	Blockbuster Entertainment Award	Favorite Supporting Actor – Action	U-571	Nominated
2008	Satellite Award	Best Supporting Actor - Series, Miniseries or Television Film	Life on Mars	Nominated
2014	Screen Actors Guild Award	Outstanding Ensemble in a Motion Picture	The Grand Budapest Hotel	Nominated
2019	Screen Actors Guild Award	Outstanding Ensemble in a Motion Picture	The Irishman	Nominated

Preceded by Paul Newman	President of the Actors Studio; 1994–present With: Al Pacino and Ellen Burstyn	Succeeded by Incumbent
