= And Miss Reardon Drinks a Little =

Play written by Paul Zindel

And Miss Reardon Drinks a Little is an American play written by Paul Zindel. The story involves three sisters: Catherine, an alcoholic; Anna, a hypochondriac; and Ceil, an attention-starved socialite.

== Productions ==
Paul Zindel wrote this play in the late 1960s. The show was first produced in 1967 in Los Angeles, but was not published until 1971 when the Dramatists Play Service in New York published it. It was also published in hardcover by Random House the same year.

And Miss Reardon Drinks a Little premiered on Broadway at the Morosco Theatre on February 22, 1971 (previews) and closed on May 29, 1971, after 108 performances and three previews. Directed by Melvin Bernhardt, the cast included Julie Harris as Anna Reardon, Estelle Parsons as Catherine Reardon, Rae Allen as Fleur Stein, Bill Macy as Bob Stein, Nancy Marchand as Ceil Adams, Paul Lieber (in his Broadway debut) as Delivery Boy, and Virginia Payne as Mrs. Pentrano.

Estelle Parsons was nominated for a 1971 Tony Award, Actress in a Play, and Rae Allen won the Tony Award for Best Featured Actress in a Play.

After the play closed on Broadway, it toured from June to August 1971. Julie Harris continued in her role of Anna through Boston, when Sandy Dennis took the role. The tour continued to the Westport Playhouse (Connecticut), the Cape Playhouse (Boston), the Lakewood Theatre (Maine), and the Ivoryton Playhouse (Connecticut). Julie Harris and Kim Stanley starred in a run at the Royal Alexandra Theatre in Toronto in late December 1971. The play resumed at the Chicago Civic Theatre in January and February 1972, in Detroit at the Fisher Theatre, the Parker Playhouse (Fort Lauderdale), and the Hyde Park Playhouse (New York) in July 1972. Betty Garrett had joined the tour in Chicago as Catherine.

And Miss Reardon Drinks a Little was Steppenwolf Theatre Company's first production, presented in January to February 1, 1974, directed by Rick Argosh.

According to Backstage, the play "is rarely done, despite four juicy female roles, some genuinely funny dialogue, and dramatic pyrotechnics such as a gunshot and a food fight. Unfortunately, these fireworks feel forced, and Zindel telegraphs them long before they explode, so their impact is minimal."

It was seen in South Boston, Massachusetts, performed by the Actor's Playhouse with Heidi Rhodes as Anna Reardon, Hillary MacArthur as Catherine Reardon, Katie Graycar as Ceil Adams, and Courtney Corbett as Fleur Stein. In November 2007, it was staged in St. Louis by Stray Dog Theatre and Ridgewater College in Willmar, Minnesota. In May 2010, it was performed in Philadelphia by Ocelot on a Leash Theater Company.

== Plot ==
Paul Zindel's dark comedy explores the relationship among three very different sisters after the death of their mother in the early 1960s. Having been abandoned by their father in early childhood, Catherine, Ceil, and Anna Reardon were raised in a small apartment by their mother. The three ladies are educated and become members of their local school community. Anna Reardon becomes a chemistry teacher, Catherine Reardon the assistant principal, and Ceil (Reardon) Adams is the superintendent of schools.

The scene of the play is in the Reardon family apartment sisters Catherine and Anna are living following the death of their mother. Several months of caring for her sick mother only to see her pass has left Anna suffering a severe nervous breakdown. She has become a complete hypochondriac, obsessed with animals and rabies. She is also on an extended break from school for allegedly molesting a male student. Catherine's reaction to both her mother's death and her sister's ailment has been to drink "a little". She is consistently drunk throughout the show. Ceil did not have any sort of contact with the family while her mother was suffering, but rather ran off to marry her sister Catherine's boyfriend, Edward Adams (who never appears on stage).

Ceil has come to the Reardon home to coax Catherine into having Anna committed. Neither Anna nor Catherine is interested in anything their sister has to say. Halfway through dinner, which consists of zucchini and kiwi, Fleur Stein invades the family conversation. Fleur works in guidance at Anna and Catherine's school, and wishes to butter up Mrs. Adams in attempt to gain a better salary. She is very colorful and somewhat obnoxious, which her husband, Bob, makes perfectly clear once he arrives.

After a humorous, but often bitter evening, Ceil demands that Anna be locked up. Catherine refuses this demand, and Ceil essentially abandons the two women to take care of each other.
