= A Farewell to Fools =

- Directed by: Bogdan Dreyer
- Written by: Anusavan Salamanian
- Produced by: Giuliano Doman; Daniel Zuta
- Starring: Gérard Depardieu; Harvey Keitel
- Cinematography: Richard Van Oosterhout
- Edited by: Philippe Ravoet
- Production company: Family Film Production
- Distributed by: Monterey Media (US)
- Release date: March 15, 2013 (Romania)
- Countries: United States; Romania; Germany; Belgium
- Languages: English; German; French

A Farewell to Fools is a 2013 independent drama film directed by Bogdan Dreyer, produced by Giuliano Doman, Daniel Zuta and written by Anusavan Salamanian. The film stars Gérard Depardieu, Harvey Keitel, Laura Morante, and Bogdan Iancu. A Farewell to Fools was filmed in the Romanian cities of Bucharest and Sighișoara. The film is a remake of the Romanian film Then I Sentenced Them All to Death (1972) directed by Sergiu Nicolaescu.

== Plot ==
Set during World War II, somewhere in Romania, a German soldier is found dead near a village, and the local authorities must find the culprit or they will all be shot by Nazis the following morning. There's no way to identify the guilty party, but there is Ipu (Gérard Depardieu), the madman of the village, who the town leaders, led by Father Johanis (Harvey Keitel), pressure to claim responsibility for the soldier's death and die to save their skins. A farce seen through the eyes of a young village boy, we witness the comedy and horror of human nature as the villagers manipulate one another — even the ones you'd least expect...

== Cast ==
- Gérard Depardieu: Ipu
- Harvey Keitel: Father Johanis
- Laura Morante: Margherita
- Bogdan Iancu: Alex

== Production ==
=== Development ===
A Farewell to Fools is directed by Bogdan Dreyer, produced by Giuliano Doman, Daniel Zuta and written by Anusavan Salamanian.

=== Filming ===
A Farewell to Fools was filmed Bucharest, Romania and Sighisoara, Mures, Romania.

== Release ==
In October 2013, Monterey Media bought the United States distribution rights from Shoreline Entertainment and released the film in the United States. The film released in theaters in the United States in Spring 2014.
