= A Memory of Two Mondays (NET Playhouse) =

- NET Playhouse episode
- Directed by: Paul Bogart
- Written by: Arthur Miller
- Based on: A Memory of Two Mondays by Arthur Miller
- Original air date: 1974
- Running time: 88 min

"A Memory of Two Mondays" is a television play directed by Paul Bogart in 1974, based on the play by Arthur Miller. It aired on the PBS series NET Playhouse.

== Premise ==
A group of workers earn their livings in a Brooklyn automobile parts warehouse during the Great Depression. Most are filled with hopelessness, some are alcoholics. Bert (Kristoffer Tabori), however, is a young man yearning for a college education.

== Cast ==
- Donald Buka as Mr. Eagle
- Catherine Burns as Patricia
- J.D. Cannon as Tom
- George Grizzard as Larry
- Dan Hamilton as Kenneth
- Earl Hindman as William
- Barnard Hughes as Jim
- Harvey Keitel as Jerry
- Tony Lo Bianco as Frank
- Estelle Parsons as Agnes
- Tom Rosqui as Unemployed Man
- Jerry Stiller as The Mechanic
- Kristoffer Tabori as Bert
- Dick Van Patten as Raymond
- Jack Warden as Gus
