= Eben Britton =

American football player (born 1987)

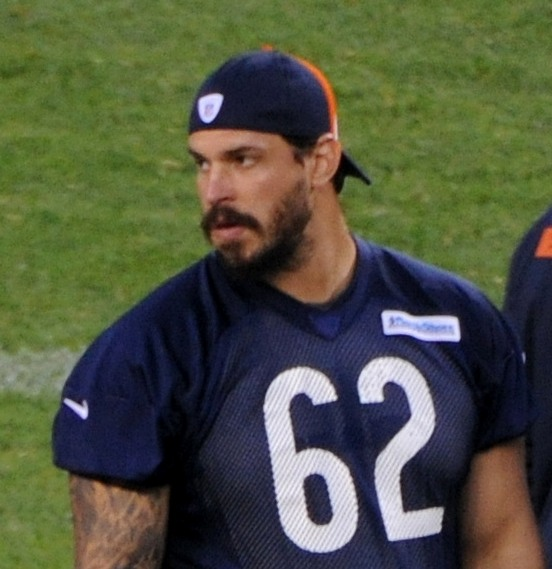
- Britton with the Chicago Bears in 2014

No. 62, 73
- Position: Offensive tackle

Personal information
- Born: October 14, 1987 (age 39); Brooklyn, New York, U.S.
- Listed height: 6 ft 6 in (1.98 m)
- Listed weight: 308 lb (140 kg)

Career information
- High school: Burroughs (Burbank, California)
- College: Arizona
- NFL draft: 2009: 2nd round, 39th overall pick

Career history
- Jacksonville Jaguars (2009–2012); Chicago Bears (2013–2014)

Awards and highlights
- First-team All-Pac-10 (2008); Second-team All-Pac-10 (2007)

Career NFL statistics
- Games played: 60
- Games started: 34
- Stats at Pro Football Reference

Eben Britton (born October 14, 1987) is an American former professional football player who was an offensive tackle for six seasons in the National Football League (NFL). He played college football for the Arizona Wildcats. Selected 39th overall in the 2009 NFL draft, he spent four years with the Jacksonville Jaguars followed by two with the Chicago Bears, last playing football in 2014. Britton started 23 games at right tackle, seven at left guard, and four as a sixth eligible lineman, for a total of 34 career starts in 60 games played.

== Early life ==
Britton attended John Burroughs High School in Burbank, California. As a senior in 2004 he was named Foothill League co-Lineman of the Year and was an All-State second-team selection. Other recognition included Los Angeles Times All-Region San Fernando Valley, Super Prep All-American, and PrepStar All-West honors. Considered a four-star recruit by Rivals.com, Britton was listed as the No. 16 offensive tackle prospect in the nation.

In addition to playing football, Britton also lettered in basketball and track, setting school records in shot put and discus.

== College career ==
Britton played college football at the University of Arizona, redshirting his first year in 2005. During his first year of athletic competition in 2006, Britton recorded 83 knockdowns and 11 touchdown-resulting blocks while playing at the right tackle position. His blocking consistency grade of 84.5 percent was the second-highest in the Pac-10 and he earned first-team Freshman All-American honors.

In 2007, Britton established himself as one of top pass protectors in college football, earning All-American and All-Pac-10 Conference recognition. He led the nation's right tackles in blocking consistency grading and his 15 touchdown-resulting blocks were tied for most by an active NCAA Division I-A player.

Playing the 2008 season at left tackle, Britton registered 111 knockdowns and 17 touchdown-resulting blocks, leading the conference as well as setting school records in both categories. He was recognized with All-American honorable mention and first-team All-Pac-10 accolades for his efforts. Following the season Britton decided to forego his final year of athletic eligibility and enter the 2009 NFL draft.

== Professional career ==
=== Pre-draft ===
In a draft loaded with talented offensive linemen, Britton was considered to be one of the better players available, drawing comparisons to Joe Thomas. He was deemed "not athletic enough to be a consistent pass blocker against the faster pass rushers" at left tackle however, and therefore was projected to "have a long, solid career on the right side". Initially thought of as a potential first-rounder, Britton fell to the second round, where he was selected 39th overall by the Jacksonville Jaguars. Reportedly angry about not being drafted in the first round, Britton said: "I'm gonna work my ass off for the Jacksonville Jaguars and people are gonna regret it. I've got my own agenda, and that's first and foremost to take the Jacksonville Jaguars to the Super Bowl. Secondly, I'm gonna be the greatest offensive tackle to ever play this game."

Pre-draft measurables
Height	Weight	Arm length	Hand span	40-yard dash	10-yard split	20-yard split	20-yard shuttle	Three-cone drill	Vertical jump	Broad jump	Bench press	Wonderlic
6 ft 6 in (1.98 m)	309 lb (140 kg)	32 3/4 in (0.83 m)	10 1/4 in (0.26 m)	5.16 s	1.80 s	2.99 s	4.91 s	7.87 s	28.5 in (0.72 m)	8 ft 4 in (2.54 m)	24 reps	31
All values from NFL Combine

=== Jacksonville Jaguars ===
In an effort to rebuild their offensive line, the Jaguars selected Eugene Monroe and Britton with their first two picks in the 2009 NFL draft. After signing a four-year, $4.6 million deal with the Jaguars on August 1, 2009, Britton entered into a preseason battle with Tony Pashos for the starting right tackle position. After winning out the competition, Britton and Monroe became the first pair of rookie offensive tackles to start together on opening day since the 1982 NFL season. Britton started 15 games on the year, missing only the fourth week due to a knee injury.

Britton remained a starter on the Jaguars offense through the first seven games of the 2010 season. During week 7 against Kansas City his right shoulder popped out multiple times however, eventually requiring three team doctors to pop it back in. The injury was subsequently determined to be a torn labrum, requiring surgery and an end to his season.

Britton missed the entire 2011 preseason and the first game of the regular season after undergoing surgery during training camp to repair a herniated disc. He then played in weeks 2 through 5, splitting time at the left guard and right tackle positions. Prior to the sixth game his back problems worsened however, to the point that he was barely able to walk. The problem was eventually determined to be an infection stemming from the back surgery he underwent earlier in the year. Britton missed the rest of the season recovering.

Starting the 2012 season at left guard, Britton suffered an ankle injury during the season opener and missed the next two games. He lost his starting job after the sixth game of the season and finished the year with 5 starts in 11 games played.

=== Chicago Bears ===
Britton signed a one-year contract with the Chicago Bears in April 2013. He appeared in 13 games and started four, spending the majority of his playing time as a sixth eligible lineman.

Britton signed another one-year contract with Chicago in April 2014. After missing most of training camp and the preseason with a hamstring injury he was released as part of final roster cuts, only to be re-signed one week later after two of the Bears starting offensive lineman were injured in the season opener. Britton appeared in 10 games for the season but did not start any. He missed five games due to appendix surgery.

In April 2015 the NFL announced that Britton would be suspended four games for an unspecified policy violation. Britton later revealed he had tested positive for Ritalin during the 2014 season, the circumstances of which he explained in an essay penned for The Cauldron. Britton never served the suspension however as he did not sign with any team after his 2014 contract expired.

== Cannabis use and advocacy ==
Britton is an advocate for removing cannabis from the list of banned substances in the NFL. Britton says he used cannabis as a preferred method of pain management during his football career, and has cited the health risks associated with pharmaceutical painkillers as a reason why players should not be punished for choosing a natural alternative. Britton is a member of the Gridiron Cannabis Coalition, a group that advocates for the NFL to change its policy on cannabis. He is also a member of the Doctors for Cannabis Regulation NFL steering committee.

Britton revealed in a September 2016 interview with the New York Post that he used cannabis before three of the NFL games he played in. Britton says that in addition to relieving the pain of his injuries, cannabis also improved his mental concentration on the football field, and that the games he played after using were some of his best performances. Britton also estimated that over 50 percent of current players use cannabis and that the number could be as high as 75 percent.

Britton is a board member of Athletes for Care, a group that advocates for athletes on various issues of health and safety including the use of cannabis as medicine. Through Athletes for Care, Britton co-hosts the Caveman Poet Society podcast along with Nate Jackson.

== Personal life ==
Britton graduated from the University of Arizona with a degree in creative writing. As a writer he has contributed essays to Leafly, Playboy, and The Cauldron.

In April 2012, Britton began hosting a radio show on NPR affiliate WJCT-FM in Jacksonville, Florida. Named Number 73 in reference to his jersey number, it featured a mixture of music and literary material woven together around a central theme that varied with each show. Some of the writings featured were composed by Britton himself.

Britton's maternal grandparents are author Richard Gehman and actress Estelle Parsons, who won the Academy Award for Best Supporting Actress in 1967 for her role in Bonnie and Clyde, and who furthermore gained recognition for her role as Bev Harris in popular situation comedy television program Roseanne. His aunt is actress Martha Gehman. He is named after his great-grandfather Eben Parsons, the father of Estelle. Britton's father Jeff is a painter and played college basketball at Jacksonville University. His mother Abbie is a journalist and owns a personal training business.

In 2018, Britton appeared in the Netflix documentary Take Your Pills in which he discusses his use of Adderall to treat ADD and to improve focus while he was in the NFL. In 2019, Britton began co-hosting the Hotboxin' with Mike Tyson podcast.
