= A Memory of Two Mondays =

1955 one-act play written by Arthur Miller

- Original language: English
- Written by: Arthur Miller
- Setting: Brooklyn

Premiere
- Date: September 29, 1955
- Place: Broadway

A Memory of Two Mondays is a one-act play by Arthur Miller. He began writing the play in 1952, while working on The Crucible, and completed it in 1955. Based on Miller's own experiences, the play focuses on a group of desperate workers earning their livings in a Brooklyn automobile parts warehouse during the Great Depression in the 1930s, a time of 25 percent unemployment in the United States. Concentrating more on character than plot, it explores the dreams of a young man yearning for a college education in the midst of people stumbling through the workday in a haze of hopelessness and despondency. Three of the characters in the story have severe problems with alcoholism.

Paired with the original one-act version of A View from the Bridge, the first Broadway production, directed by Martin Ritt, opened on September 29, 1955, at the Coronet Theatre, where it ran for 149 performances. The cast included Van Heflin, J. Carrol Naish, Jack Warden, Eileen Heckart, and Richard Davalos, who won the Theatre World Award for his performance.

In 1959, Miller adapted the play for an ITV broadcast starring Alan Bates.

Miller adapted the play for a 1971 television movie directed by Paul Bogart, A Memory of Two Mondays.

After seven previews, a Broadway revival directed by Arvin Brown opened on January 26, 1976, at the Playhouse Theatre where, paired this time with 27 Wagons Full of Cotton by Tennessee Williams, it ran for 67 performances. The cast included Thomas Hulce, John Lithgow, Tony Musante, Joe Grifasi, and Meryl Streep.

== 1976 awards and nominations ==
- Tony Award for Best Featured Actress in a Play (Streep, nominee)
- Theatre World Award (Streep, winner)
- Drama Desk Award for Outstanding Actress in a Play (Streep, nominee)
- Drama Desk Award for Outstanding Featured Actor in a Play (Leonardo Cimino and Roy Poole, nominees)
- Drama Desk Award for Outstanding Featured Actress in a Play (Alice Drummond, nominee)
- Drama Desk Award for Outstanding Director of a Play (nominee)
- Drama Desk Award for Outstanding Costume Design (nominee)
- Drama Desk Award for Outstanding Lighting Design (nominee)
- Drama Desk Award for Outstanding Set Design (nominee)
- Drama Desk Award for Outstanding Revival (nominee)
