= The Dream Girl (operetta) =

Operetta by Victor Herbert

The Dream Girl is an operetta in three acts with music by Victor Herbert and book by Rida Johnson Young (who also wrote the lyrics) and Harold Atteridge. Based on the 1906 play The Road to Yesterday, by Beulah Marie Dix and Evelyn Greenleaf Sutherland, its satiric story concerns reincarnation. Additional music was written by Sigmund Romberg. The piece was Victor Herbert's last musical composition, and the work was produced posthumously on Broadway in 1924.

== Production ==
The Dream Girl opened at the Ambassador Theatre on Broadway on August 20, 1924, and ran for 117 performances. It starred Fay Bainter, George LeMaire and Walter Woolf and was staged by J. C. Huffman.

== Roles and original cast ==
- Ken Paulton - Edward Basse
- Will Levison - John Clarke
- Elspeth - Fay Bainter
- Cristoforo - Edmund Fitzpatrick
- Wilson Addison - George LeMaire
- Bobby Thompkins - Frank Masters
- Elinor Levison - Alice Moffat
- Aunt Harriet - Maude Odell
- Mr. Gillette - William Oneal
- Nora - Clara Palmer
- Dolly Follis - Wyn Richmond
- Jimmie Van Dyke - Billie B. Van
- Malena - Vavara
- Jack Warren - Walter Woolf

== Musical numbers ==
Act I

- Making a Venus - Bobby Thompkins, Malena, Models and Boys
- All Year Round (Music by Sigmund Romberg) - Jack Warren and Chorus
- Dancing Round - Elspeth and Chorus
- (My) Dream Girl (I Loved You Long Ago) - Jack
- Old Songs - Maidens and Quartette

Act II

- Maiden, Let Me In - Will Levison and Boys
- Gypsy Life - Malena and Chorus
- Stop, Look and Listen - Elspeth, Jimmie Van Dyke and Bobby
- (The) Broad Highway - Jack and Chorus
- My Hero - Elspeth and Jack
- I Want to Go Home (Music by Sigmund Romberg)- Elspeth

Act III

- Bubbles - Dolly Follis and Chorus
- Make Love in the Morning - Jimmie and Dancers
- Saxophone Man - Bobby, Dolly and Chorus
- Dream Girl - Elspeth, Jack and Company
