= We Bombed in New Haven =

We Bombed in New Haven is a 1967 play by Joseph Heller. An anti-war black comedy, it is thematically linked in part to Heller's famous novel Catch-22.

The play opened on Broadway at the Ambassador Theatre on October 16, 1968, and closed on December 29, 1968, after 85 performances.

The play is heavily metatheatrical, being not only staged at but also set at the Ambassador Theatre, the actors playing actors appearing in a play at the Ambassador. This play-within-a-play concerns a strategic bombing squadron; the squadron commander frequently steps out of character to reassure the audience that they are only watching a play.

This conceit is carried to the point where the actors themselves exhibit confusion over whether they really are actors playing airmen, or actual airmen. For instance, in the second act, Henderson (played by Ron Leibman) is scheduled to be killed – he knows this, being familiar with the script, and is not worried; but then later, a corporal is killed on a mission, and Henderson is unable to find him offstage. Henderson worries that the corporal really has been killed, and that perhaps the "play" is reality.

This "phantasmagoric world in which actors might not know where the grease paint ended and the blood began", where the audience is led to believe in both levels of reality as the borders blend and blur in manner reminiscent of the works of Luigi Pirandello, is used by Heller to satirize and excoriate the moral blindness that leads people to treat war as spectacle, equating the real death and suffering of war with the deaths of actors in war movies.

New York Times theatre critic Clive Barnes gave the play a mixed review ("I would call it a bad play any good playwright should be proud to have written, and any good audience fascinated to see"); the New York Post was more enthusiastic ("An exceptional quality of imagination that is at once comic, bitter and moving, and it is immensely effective in dramatic terms").

The title of the play is ironic with a double meaning. In 1967, plays frequently opened in New Haven, Connecticut for a tryout run before moving to Broadway (perhaps via Boston or Philadelphia), and "bombed in New Haven" would describe a play that was found there to be too flawed to make it to Broadway. And the airmen do literally bomb in New Haven (as well as other targets such as Minnesota and "Constantinople") in the course of the play, reason for these seemingly absurd targeting orders from the High Command never being given.

Prior to its Broadway opening, the play was premiered in New Haven by the Yale Repertory Theatre in 1967 starring Stacy Keach, Estelle Parsons, and Ron Leibman (who went with the play to Broadway). In the original Broadway production, players included Ron Leibman, Anthony Holland, Jason Robards, Diana Sands and William Roerick. Although its eleven-week run was respectable, the play is generally considered to have not been a success, but a Broadway revival was staged in 1972 at the Circle in the Square Theatre, featuring Steven Keats and James Doerr, and the play has been occasionally staged at various venues throughout the rest of the twentieth century and into the twenty-first.
