= Sunday Dinner (TV series) =

American sitcom television series

- Genre: Sitcom
- Created by: Norman Lear
- Starring: Robert Loggia; Teri Hatcher; Kari Lizer; Martha Gehman; Patrick Breen; Shiri Appleby; Marian Mercer
- Opening theme: "Love Begins at Home" performed by Kim Carnes
- Country of origin: United States
- Original language: English
- No. of seasons: 1
- No. of episodes: 6

Production
- Running time: 30 minutes
- Production companies: Act III Television; Columbia Pictures Television

Original release
- Network: CBS
- Release: June 2 – July 7, 1991

Sunday Dinner is an American sitcom television series which aired on CBS from June 2, 1991, until July 7, 1991. The series was produced by Norman Lear, and marked his return to television producing after an absence of several years. Lear's wife Lyn Davis Lear served as co-producer on the series, which was the first official Lear show to be made under his latest production marquee Act III Television.

== Synopsis ==
The series starred Robert Loggia as Ben Benedict, a widowed 56-year-old businessman in Long Island who falls in love with a 30-year-old lawyer, Thelma Todd "TT" Fagori (Teri Hatcher). Being true to Lear fashion, the situation of Ben and TT's age difference was an issue in itself, but the show also tackled other environmental and social issues in the way that his earlier shows (All in the Family, Maude, etc.) did, with a dose of spirituality. Ben's kids, who were all around TT's age, resented her involvement with their father, except for beloved son Kenneth (Patrick Breen), a real estate agent on the fast track, who seemed to root them on.

The cast also included Marian Mercer as Ben's sister Martha Benedict, who had been living with Ben's family since the death of his wife. Ben's daughters were airheaded Diana (Kari Lizer), who worked in fashion design, and forthright intellectual Vicky (Martha Gehman), a microbiologist, who was back living at home after her divorce, along with her precocious young daughter, Rachel (Shiri Appleby).

In every episode, some stressful confrontation or incident between TT and the Benedicts would occur. These situations were usually the result of Diana and Vicky's feeble attempts to undermine Ben and TT's romance. They refused to get past the surface image of TT being "just another bimbo" who, despite being in a well-paying profession herself, may have only been after an older man for his money. At every situation's climax, TT would retreat to a private corner and address "The Chief", engaging in a one-sided talk with God about her issues. Lear insisted on making TT a devout Catholic as well as an environmentalist, to further reflect the study of spirituality up against politics and American family values in the series. In fact, the format for Sunday Dinner was based upon Lear's marriage to his third wife Lyn, who was considerably younger than he was.

== Cast ==
- Robert Loggia as Ben Benedict
- Teri Hatcher as TT Fagori
- Kari Lizer as Diana Benedict, Ben's daughter
- Martha Gehman as Vicky Benedict, Ben's daughter
- Patrick Breen as Kenneth Benedict, Ben's son
- Shiri Appleby as Rachel Benedict, Vicky's daughter
- Marian Mercer as Martha Benedict, Ben's younger sister

== Episodes ==
| No. | Title | Directed by | Written by | Original release date |
|---|---|---|---|---|
| 1 | "Welcome T.T." | Peter Baldwin | Norman Lear | June 2, 1991 |
| 2 | "Guess Who's Coming to Sunday Dinner" | Peter Baldwin | Howard Gould | June 9, 1991 |
| 3 | "In Sickness and in Health" | Jack Shea | Marta Kauffman & David Crane | June 16, 1991 |
| 4 | "My Dinner with Jack and Delores" | Jack Shea | Fred Graver | June 23, 1991 |
| 5 | "The Write Stuff" | Jack Shea | Wayne Lemon | June 30, 1991 |
| 6 | "Whose House is it Anyway?" | Jack Shea | Marie Therese Squerciati | July 7, 1991 |

== Time slot ==
CBS was sure that Lear's comeback would be successful, and in the process moved summer reruns of Murder, She Wrote to 9 p.m. in order to air Sunday Dinner on Sunday nights at 8/7c, alongside reruns of Lear's classic All in the Family (at 8:30/7:30c). After two weeks, however, both programs swapped time slots. Neither the press or scheduling helped; the show only lasted six weeks due to middling ratings.
