= Paul Lieber =

American film, television and theatre actor

- Occupations: Film, television and theatre actor
- Years active: 1970–present
- Website: paullieber.com

Paul Lieber is an American film, television and theatre actor. He is best known for playing the recurring role of Detective Sergeant Eric Dorsey in the seventh season of the American sitcom television series Barney Miller.

Lieber guest-starred in numerous television programs including Who's the Boss?, Dallas, Cagney & Lacey, Murder, She Wrote, Night Court, Silver Spoons, Law & Order, Monk, Jake and the Fatman, The X-Files, Judging Amy and Curb Your Enthusiasm. In 1971, he appeared in the Broadways plays And Miss Reardon Drinks a Little and Lenny. In 1983, he starred as the older brother Treat in the play Orphans, and in 1995, he played Elia Kazan in the play Names.

Aside from acting, Lieber taught poetry at Loyola Marymount University, and taught acting at the American Musical and Dramatic Academy. He was nominated three times for the Pushcart Prize.
