= Chamberlain Brown =

Chamberlain Brown (April 1, 1892 – November 12, 1955) was a theater impresario in the United States. He acted, produced Broadway plays, represented actors as a casting agent, published theatrical publications, and hosted radio shows about the theater with guest stars in each episode. His brother Lyman joined him in the business.

Chamberlain and Lyman were born to George M. Brown and Delorius (Chamberlain) Brown, daughter of Samuel E. Chamberlain.

The Brown boys began collecting theater mementos and autographs while still young and their father, a department store owner, helped launch and fund Chamberlain's career in the theater business. The New York Public Library has a collection of their papers. A diary of their theater goings kept by the two brothers documents vaudeville and theater in Boston and New York City from 1909 until 1914.

One of his radio shows, Stars of Yesterday, Today, and Tomorrow, featured celebrity guests. Brown reportedly refused to meet with Mary Orr, but had a role in her being cast by Preston Sturges. He helped Jean Arthur get a part in a production in New York City.

Their firm had many prominent clients including Clark Gable and Spencer Tracy.

Chamberlain Brown's Scrapbook (1932) was a musical revue set in vaudeville style. Ina Hayward gave her last performance in it.
