= Miss Margarida's Way =

Play written by Roberto Athayde

Miss Margarida's Way (Portuguese: Apareceu a Margarida) is a satirical play written by Brazilian playwright Roberto Athayde in 1971 as a satire on abuse of power based on the dictatorship in his country, Brazil. It was first performed in the United States at the American Contemporary Theatre in San Francisco on 4 March 1975. It became well known when Estelle Parsons played in the performance on Broadway in 1977/8.

The play is set in what looks like a school classroom. The play's cast typically consists of only two people: Miss Margarida, a school teacher, and a male student. This "student" often sits among the audience members, whom the "teacher" addresses and treats as if they were real school children.

In many productions, the audience is encouraged to behave like a group of naughty, unruly 13- to 14-year-old students in a classroom. Frequently, there is a blackboard on stage, along with chalk that audience members can use to write or draw whatever they wish. The actress playing Miss Margarida has a great deal of power to improvise, and can deliver jokes or rants inspired by audience members.

Playwright Athayde intended Miss Margarida to represent power: the power of government, the power of church, the power of family, the power of peers, raw power in all its forms. She can and will do anything to impose her will upon her students- first attempting to charm them, then to intimidate them, then to manipulate them with her sexuality. Miss Margarida's classroom techniques represent all the ways in which life can rob human beings of their individuality, and beat them into conformity and submission.
