= Romaine Callender =

British-American actor

Alfred Romaine Callender (February 17, 1883 – February 5, 1976) was an English born American actor of stage and screen. He should not be confused with several other men in his family also known publicly as Romaine Callendar, including his father, the stage actor Edwin Romaine Callendar (1845–1922), and his uncle, the music educator, conductor, composer, organ builder, and book author William Romaine Callender (1859–1930).

Callender began his career as a stage actor in 1906 performing with Robert B. Mantell's Shakespeare company. He had a prolific career as an actor on Broadway from 1910 through 1935. He simultaneously worked periodically in film; making his screen debut in the silent film My Wife in 1918. While predominantly a stage actor during the silent film era, in 1935 he transitioned away from the theatre and became am actor in sound films under contract with Columbia Pictures; starring as a character actor in almost 50 feature films from 1935 to 1945.

== Early life and stage career ==
Alfred Romaine Callender was born on 17 February 1883 in Sheffield, England. He was the son of actor Edward Romaine Callender and Florence Callender (née Chapman). His father was known as Romaine Callender and E. Romaine Callendar on the stage. His uncle, the composer, conductor, and music educator William Romaine Callendar, was the director of the Metropolitan College of Music in Philadelphia and was also known publicly as Romaine Callendar. When his uncle died in 1930, it was initially incorrectly reported in the press that the actor Alfred Romaine Callender was the one who died because both men were known publicly as Romaine Callender.

Callender began performing on the stage as Alfred Callendar in 1906 with Robert B. Mantell's theatre company for performances in Montreal, Buffalo, New York, and Boston. He made his debut with that company at His Majesty's Theatre, Montreal as the Duke of Albany in William Shakespeare's King Lear on September 5, 1906. Other roles he portrayed with that company in the 1906–1907 season included Gratiano in Othello, Sir Robert Brackenbury in Richard III, Salanio in The Merchant of Venice, and Tillius Cimber in Julius Caesar.

When Callender made his Broadway debut at the Empire Theatre in 1910 as Rideout in Arthur Wing Pinero's Mid-Channel he was now billed as A. Romaine Callender. Following this production he joined William Gillette's theatre troupe; portraying the role of Gordon Hayne in a national tour of Gillette's five act war drama Held by the Enemy. He returned to Broadway as Don Mackenzie in Thompson Buchanan's The Rack (1911, Playhouse Theatre). Bonnaire in Pierre Wolff's Les Marionnettes (1911–1912, Lyceum Theatre), Ibrahim in J. B. Fagan's Bella Donna (1912, Empire Theatre; 1913, Wallack's Theatre) and Achille in Edward Sheldon's The Song of Songs (1914–1915, Eltinge 42nd Street Theatre).

In 1918 Callendar enlisted in the United States Navy and was in service during the latter part of World War I. After the war he returned to Broadway in Arnold Bennett's Sacred and Profane Love (1920, Morosco Theatre), as El Nacional in Tom Cushing's Blood and Sand (1921, Empire Theatre), and as J. Sloane Henshaw in George S. Kaufman and Marc Connelly's Merton of the Movies (1922–1923, Cort Theatre).

Callender continued to appear on the stage as A. Romaine Callender until after the death of his father in 1922. Not long after this he took his father's stage name of Romaine Callender; first appearing on Broadway under that name as Snake in the 1925 revival of The School for Scandal at the Knickerbocker Theatre. In 1927 he portrayed Asst. State's Attorney Welch in the original production of Bartlett Cormack's The Racket at the Ambassador Theatre. His other later Broadway credits include the roles of Malacoda in Mima (1928), Dr. Otternschlag in Grand Hotel (1930), Fernand Demoncey in The Man Who Reclaimed His Head (1932), Dr. Frederick Swan in Keeper of the Keys (1933), Cesar Poustiano in Another Love (1934), General Michael Rakovski in Judgment Day (1934), and Wesley Cartwright Post Road (1934–1935).

== Film career ==
In 1935, Callender left New York City for Hollywood and became a contract player with Columbia Pictures. His first film with Columbia was the 1935 screwball comedy If You Could Only Cook in which he portrayed Jennings, the butler. Film historian and The Washington Post critic John Dileo wrote that this film's "droll highpoint has Marsall seeking instruction from his own butler (well-named Romaine Callender) on how to be a butler; it's a memorably civilized bit of role reversal." Callender portrayed butlers, often with humorous impact, in several more Columbia pictures; including the films The Music Goes 'Round (1936), Pepper (1936), Life Begins with Love (1937), The Amazing Dr. Clitterhouse (1938), Wuthering Heights (1939), and It's a Date (1940). As a character actor, Callender starred in almost 50 feature films from 1935 to 1945; most of them for Columbia.

== Death ==
Romaine Callender died in New York City on February 5, 1976.

== Partial filmography ==
Year	Film	Role	Director	Reference
1918	My Wife	Valstock	Dell Henderson	
1918	The Floor Below	Ziegler	Clarence G. Badger	
1935	If You Could Only Cook	Jennings	William A. Seiter	
1936	Adventure in Manhattan	Old Taxi Driver	Edward Ludwig	
1936	Alibi for Murder	E.J. Easton	D. Ross Lederman	
1936	The Music Goes 'Round	Butler	Victor Schertzinger	
1936	And So They Were Married	Mr. Snirley	Elliott Nugent	
1936	36 Hours to Kill	Simpkins	Eugene Forde	
1936	High Tension	F. Willoughby Tuttle	Allan Dwan	
1936	Pepper	Butler	James Tinling	
1937	45 Fathers	Hastings	James Tinling	
1937	Life Begins with Love	Winterbloom	Ray McCarey	
1937	Wild and Woolly	Doctor	Alfred L. Werker	
1938	Sharpshooters	Consul's Assistant	James Tinling	
1938	One Wild Night	Ogden Hepple	Eugene Forde	
1938	Passport Husband	Judge	James Tinling	
1938	The Amazing Dr. Clitterhouse	Roberts	Anatole Litvak	
1939	Wuthering Heights	Robert	William Wyler	
1939	Pardon Our Nerve	Escort Bureau Man	H. Bruce Humberstone	
1940	Victory	Missionary	John Cromwell	
1940	It's a Date	Evans	William A. Seiter	
1940	Second Chorus	Waiter	H. C. Potter	
1940	Captain Caution	English Officer	Richard Wallace	
1940	Susan and God	Oliver Leeds	George Cukor	
1940	I Can't Give You Anything But Love, Baby	O'Toole	Albert S. Rogell	
1941	Honolulu Lu	Hotel manager	Charles Barton	
1941	The Body Disappears	Prof. Barkley	D. Ross Lederman	
1941	Appointment for Love	Mr. Waterbury	William A. Seiter	
1941	Kisses for Breakfast	Dr. George Burroughs	Lewis Seiler	
1941	Flight from Destiny	Psychiatrist	Vincent Sherman	
1942	Lucky Legs	Crump	Charles Barton	
1942	You're Telling Me	J.T. Dorsett	Charles Lamont	
1942	The Wife Takes a Flyer	Zanten	Richard Wallace	
1942	The Lady Is Willing	Bald-headed man	Mitchell Leisen	
1943	There's Something About a Soldier	Chaplain	Alfred E. Green	
1943	My Kingdom for a Cook	Clifton	Richard Wallace	
1943	Yanks Ahoy	Col. Elliot	Kurt Neumann	
1943	Two Señoritas from Chicago	Miffins	Frank Woodruff	
1944	Mademoiselle Fifi	Manufacturer	Robert Wise	
1944	It Happened Tomorrow	Andrew	René Clair	
1945	Road to Utopia	Man in Top Hat	Hal Walker	
