= The Racket (play) =

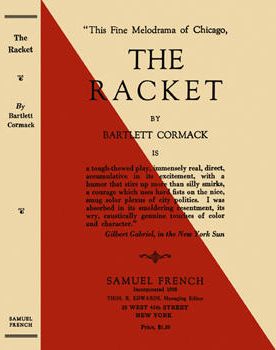
- First edition 1928
- Original language: English
- Written by: Bartlett Cormack
- Genre: drama
- Setting: Chicago police station

Premiere
- Date: November 22, 1927
- Place: Ambassador Theatre; New York City, New York

The Racket is a 1927 Broadway three-act drama written by Bartlett Cormack and produced by Alexander McKaig. It ran for 119 performances from November 22, 1927, to March 1928 at the Ambassador Theatre. Edward G. Robinson had a major role as a snarling gangster, which led to his being cast in similar film roles. It was included in Burns Mantle's The Best Plays of 1927-1928.

It was adapted as a silent feature film also titled The Racket in 1928 and the 1951 film noir remake The Racket, starring Robert Mitchum.

== Cast ==
- John Cromwell as Captain McQuigg
- Edward G. Robinson as an unidentified man
- Edward Eliscu as Joe
- Norman Foster as Dave Ames
- Harry McCoy as Turck
- Willard Robertson as Pratt
- Ralph Adams as Sam Meyer
- Romaine Callender as Asst. State's Attorney Welch
- Jack Clifford as Clark
- Marion Coakley as Irene Hayes
- G. Pat Collins as patrolman Johnson
- Harry English as Lt. Gill
- Mike Flanagan as patrolman
- Louis Frohoff as Alderman Kublacek
- Mal Kelly as Sgt. Sullivan
- Fred Irving Lewis as Detective Sgt. Delaney
- Hugh O'Connell as Miller
- Charles O'Connor as patrolman
- Charles Peyton as Glick
- C.E. Smith as Sgt. Schmidt
