= Unholy Partners =

1941 film by Mervyn LeRoy

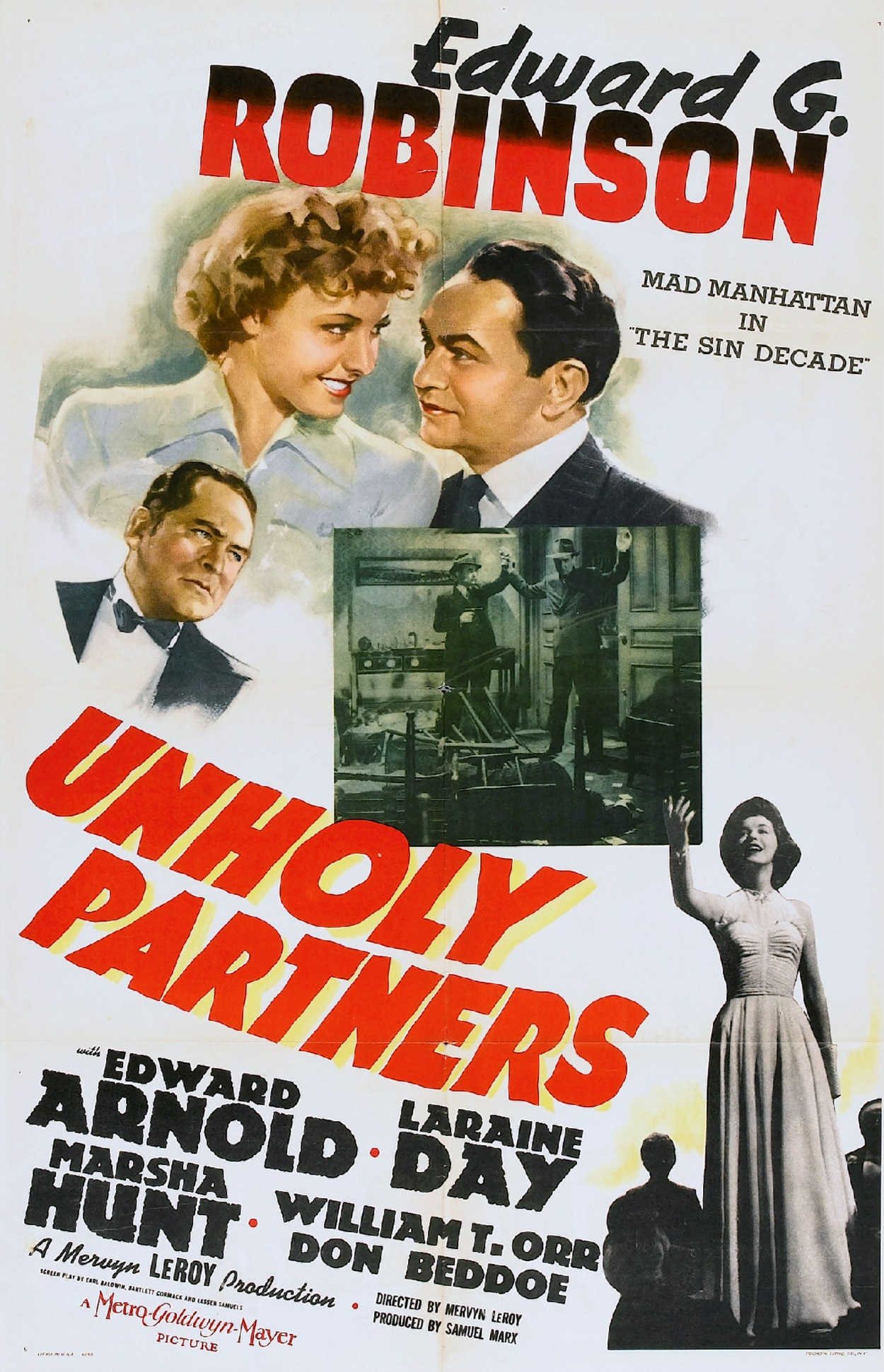
- Directed by: Mervyn LeRoy
- Written by: Earl Baldwin; Bartlett Cormack
- Produced by: Mervyn LeRoy; Samuel Marx
- Starring: Edward G. Robinson; Laraine Day; Edward Arnold; Marsha Hunt
- Cinematography: George Barnes
- Edited by: Harold F. Kress
- Music by: David Snell
- Production company: Metro-Goldwyn-Mayer
- Distributed by: Loew's Inc.
- Release date: November 1941
- Running time: 94 minutes
- Country: United States
- Language: English

Unholy Partners is a 1941 American crime drama film directed by Mervyn LeRoy and starring Edward G. Robinson, Laraine Day, Edward Arnold and Marsha Hunt. It was produced and distributed by Metro-Goldwyn-Mayer.

== Plot ==
A newspaper reporter, Bruce Corey, returns from World War I to New York City. After reporting to his job at his old newspaper, Corey finds that his old editor doesn't like his new ideas. Corey and his war correspondent friends start their own down-market newspaper which will feature "the news before it happens." Corey gambles with a mob boss and wins the money to start up his paper, the New York Mercury, an instant success.

However, because of stories that may implicate the newspaper's silent partner in a number of crimes, Corey finds himself and his staff threatened and even the targets of gunfire. Corey finally kills the mob boss and flees the country on a plane that is attempting a trans-Atlantic flight. The plane crashes and he is killed. Rather than embroil the paper in the murder investigation, Corey embarks on what he knows is an extremely dangerous flight. The plane does crash mid-ocean at the end he is reported to have swum away from a rescue craft.

== Cast ==
- Edward G. Robinson as Bruce Corey
- Edward Arnold as Merrill Lambert
- Laraine Day as Miss Cronin
- Marsha Hunt as Gail Fenton
- William T. Orr as Thomas Jarvis
- Don Beddoe as Michael Reynolds
- Walter Kingsford as Mr. Peck - Managing Editor
- Charles Dingle as Clyde Fenton
- Charles Halton as Phil Kaper - Attorney
- Joe Downing as Jerry - Henchman
- Clyde Fillmore as Jason Grant
- Emory Parnell as Col. Mason
- Don Costello as Georgie Pelotti
- Marcel Dalio as Molyneaux
- Robert Homans as Inspector Pat Brody
- Elliott Sullivan as Eddie
- Frank Faylen as Roger Ordway
- Frank Orth as Shino McGoon
- William Edmunds as Pop, Night Watchman
- Florine McKinney as Mary, Secretary
- June MacCloy as Blonde in Miami
- Ray Teal as Waiter
- Bert Moorhouse as Gambler
- Ann Pennington as Telephone Operator

== Bibliography ==
- Boggs, Johnny D. American Newspaper Journalists on Film: Portrayals of the Press During the Sound Era. McFarland, 2022.
- Fetrow, Alan G. Feature Films, 1940-1949: a United States Filmography. McFarland, 1994.
