= Edward G. Robinson =

American actor (1893–1973)

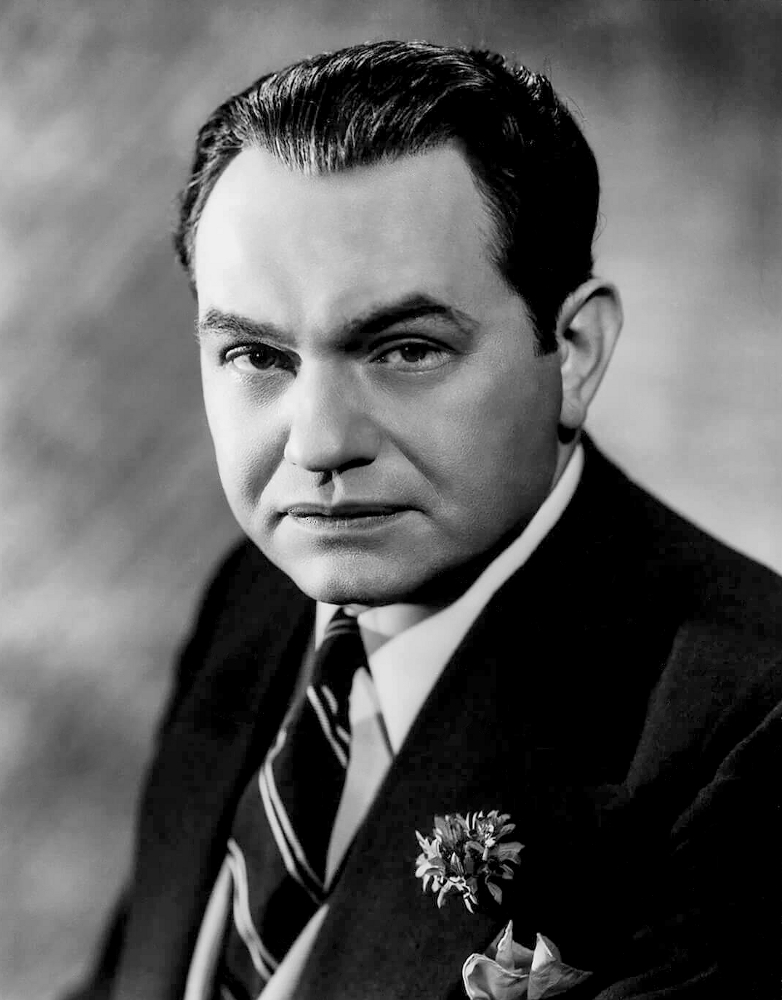
- Robinson in the 1930s
- Born: Emanuel Goldenberg; December 12, 1893; Bucharest, Kingdom of Romania
- Died: January 26, 1973 (aged 79); Los Angeles, California, U.S.
- Resting place: Beth El Cemetery, Ridgewood, Queens
- Occupation: Actor
- Years active: 1913–1973
- Spouses: Gladys Lloyd (m. 1927; div. 1956) Jane Adler (m. 1958)
- Children: Edward G. Robinson Jr.
- Awards: Cannes Film Festival Award for Best Actor (1949); Screen Actors Guild Life Achievement Award (1969); Honorary Academy Award (1973)

Edward Goldenberg Robinson (born Emanuel Goldenberg; December 12, 1893 – January 26, 1973) was an American actor who was popular during Hollywood's Golden Age. After making his stage debut in 1913, he rose to stardom with his performance as the title character in Little Caesar (1931) and became well known for his portrayals of gangsters. He starred in a variety of films, including the biopics Dr. Ehrlich's Magic Bullet and A Dispatch from Reuters (both 1940) and the film noirs Double Indemnity and The Woman in the Window (both 1944).

During the 1930s and 1940s, Robinson was an outspoken public critic of fascism and Nazism, which were growing in strength in Europe in the years which led up to World War II. His activism included contributing over $250,000 to more than 850 organizations that were involved in war relief, along with contributions to cultural, educational, and religious groups. His postwar films include The Stranger (1946) and Key Largo (1948), and he won the Cannes Film Festival Award for Best Actor for House of Strangers (1949).

During the 1950s, Robinson was called to testify in front of the House Un-American Activities Committee during the Red Scare, but he was cleared of any deliberate Communist involvement. He did not name names but renounced a number of leftist organizations so as not to be probed further. As a result of being investigated, he found himself on Hollywood's graylist, people who were on the Hollywood blacklist maintained by the major studios, but could find work at minor film studios on what was called Poverty Row. He returned to the A-list when Cecil B. DeMille cast him as Dathan (the adversary of Moses) in The Ten Commandments (1956).

During his 60-year career, Robinson appeared in 30 Broadway plays, and more than 100 films. In 1956, he was nominated for the Tony Award for Best Actor in a Play for Middle of the Night. He played his final role in the science-fiction story Soylent Green (1973). Multiple film critics and media outlets have cited him as one of the best actors never to have received an Academy Award nomination. He received an Academy Honorary Award for his work in the film industry, which was awarded two months after he died in 1973. In 1999, he was ranked number 24 in the American Film Institute's list of the 25 greatest male stars of Classic American cinema.

== Early years and education ==
Robinson was born Menashe Goldenberg (Yiddish: מנשה גאלדענבערג) on December 12, 1893, in a Yiddish-speaking Romanian Jewish family in Bucharest, the fifth and penultimate son of Sarah (née Guttman) and Yeshaya Moyshe Goldenberg (later called Morris in the U.S.), a builder and tinsmith. He had five brothers: Zach, Jack, Oscar, Willie, and Max. The family lived in one of several attached buildings surrounding a court at 671 Strada Cantemier in Bucharest. Emanuel, known as "Manny", was close to his maternal grandmother, who lived with them and often told him stories from the Hebrew Bible. He was enrolled at a Jewish school, where he studied the Torah and learned Hebrew and German. Once, his father took him to a see a film, a silent Western, but both thought motion pictures were just "a passing fad." At a Bucharest café they saw a Romanian play based on Jules Verne's Around the World in Eighty Days: "I loved that, and I thought the actors were making up the words."

According to the New York Times, one of his brothers was attacked by an anti-semitic gang during a "schoolboy pogrom". In the wake of that violence, the family decided to emigrate to the United States. Robinson arrived in New York City on February 21, 1904. "At Ellis Island I was born again," he wrote. "Life for me began when I was 10 years old." He grew up on the Lower East Side, and had his bar mitzvah at the First Roumanian-American Congregation. He attended Townsend Harris High School and then the City College of New York, planning to become a criminal attorney. An interest in acting and performing in front of people led to his winning an American Academy of Dramatic Arts scholarship, after which he changed his name to Edward G. Robinson (the G. standing for his original surname). He had heard the surname "Robinson" in a play and liked "the ring and strength of it", and for the given name he chose "Edward" after King Edward VII. Despite the fact that he emigrated to the US at 10 years old, Robinson remained fluent in Romanian his entire life: during a 1966 trip to Romania, in an interview with Contemporanul, he demanded the journalists to speak Romanian, not English, claiming that he understood everything.

He served in the United States Navy during World War I, but was not sent overseas.

== Career ==
=== Theatre and silent film debut ===
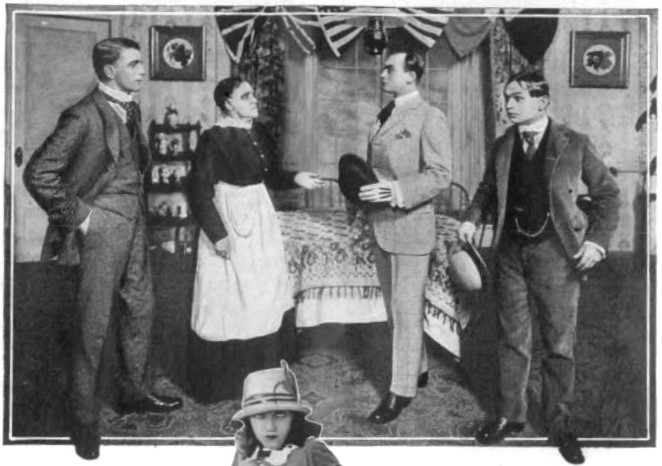
William J. Phinney, Marie Haynes, Curtis Cooksey, and Robinson in the 1918 play The Little Teacher.

Robinson made his professional stage debut playing a character named Sato in a production of Paid in Full, which opened in April 1913 in Binghamton, New York. He then joined a Cincinnati stock company called The Orpheum Players for 22 weeks and played various roles in many plays, including two different characters in Alias Jimmy Valentine. "I was becoming adept at doubling—that is, playing two parts in one play, in suitable disguises. I did it all season," he later wrote. Robinson's next stage appearance was as the guide Nasir in a touring production of Kismet that took him to Ottawa and Montreal before closing in November 1914. In 1915, Robinson made his Broadway debut at the Hudson Theatre in Archibald and Edgar Selwyn's production of the play Under Fire, written by Roi Cooper Megrue. He played four roles in Under Fire: "They were all bit parts, but I portrayed a French spy, a Belgian peasant, a Prussian soldier and a Cockney private. I became known as the league of nations." Under Fire ran for six months and the Selwyns hired Robinson for the role of a prisoner in their production of another play written by Megrue, Under Sentence. After Under Sentence, he played a wide range of characters, including a Filipino in Azelle M. Aldrich and Joseph Noll's The Pawn (1917), a German soldier in Drafted (1917), a Swede in Henning Berger's The Deluge (1917), and a French-Canadian in Harry James Smith's The Little Teacher (1918). The Little Teacher was a success, but he left the production to enlist as a sailor in the United States Navy. He went to Pelham Bay Naval Training Station and also applied to enter naval intelligence. During this time, Robinson thought films were "scarcely an art form" and believed "the living theater was the only theater and all the rest was nonsense."

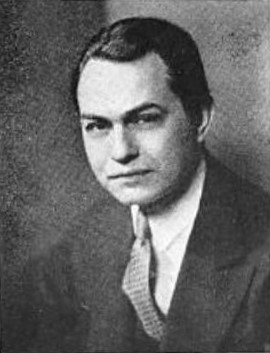
Robinson in the 1920s

When World War I ended, Robinson went back to the stage and toured with the Garrick Players of Washington, D.C. He returned to Broadway in 1919 with a role in First is Last, "the first and only time" he played an Anglo-Saxon on stage. In 1920, he was cast in productions of Maxim Gorky's Night Lodging and Booth Tarkington's Poldekin. In November, Arthur Hopkins gave him a role in a play titled Samson and Delilah, starring Jacob Ben-Ami. He disliked his performance in the silent film Fields of Glory and producer Sam Goldwyn cut it out. In the summer of 1921, he performed in five plays at the Elitch Theatre in Denver, Colorado. He liked his role as Mendel in The Idle Inn (1921) and also played in the 1922 revival of The Deluge. Following a return to Denver's Elitch Theatre for the summer of 1922, Robinson accepted a role in Alfred Savoir's Banco, with Alfred Lunt in the title role. Film director John S. Robertson offered Robinson the supporting role of Domingo Escobar in the silent film The Bright Shawl (1923), which was based on a Joseph Hergesheimer novel of the same title. Robinson traveled to Havana, Cuba, for the filming and was paid the equivalent of a stage actor's 20-week salary. He later remembered, "In any case, The Bright Shawl was not nearly as heartrending an experience as Fields of Glory. Still, the manufacture of a movie seemed silly and unrewarding to me." In 1923, he appeared in four Broadway productions: Henrik Ibsen's Peer Gynt, starring his friend Joseph Schildkraut; Elmer Rice's avant-garde The Adding Machine; Ferenc Molnár's Launzi, with Pauline Lord in the title role; and A Royal Fandango, starring Ethel Barrymore.

=== Broadway success and first sound films ===
In 1924, Robinson played the role of Ed Munn in a stage adaptation of the Olive Higgins Prouty novel Stella Dallas, starring the eminent actress Mrs. Leslie Carter in the title role. That same year, he had a role in the successful Broadway production of Edwin Justus Mayer's The Firebrand, a play about Benvenuto Cellini and the Medicis; Robinson played the part of Ottaviano, the cousin of Frank Morgan's character, Alessandro de' Medici, Duke of Florence. From November 1925 to January 1926, Robinson played two George Bernard Shaw characters: Caesar in the Theatre Guild revival of Androcles and the Lion and Giuseppe in its curtain raiser, The Man of Destiny. He played a Jew in the Guild's production of Franz Werfel's The Goat Song (1926). The Guild cast him as a stage director in Nikolai Evreinov's The Chief Thing (1926), a play he described as "highly theatrical and stirring." In August, Robinson appeared with actress Gladys Lloyd (his future wife) in the play Henry Behave. In October, he portrayed Mexican general Porfirio Díaz in the Guild production of Juarez and Maximilian, a Werfel play about the Second Mexican Empire. In November, he played a New England lawyer in Sidney Howard's Ned McCobb's Daughter.

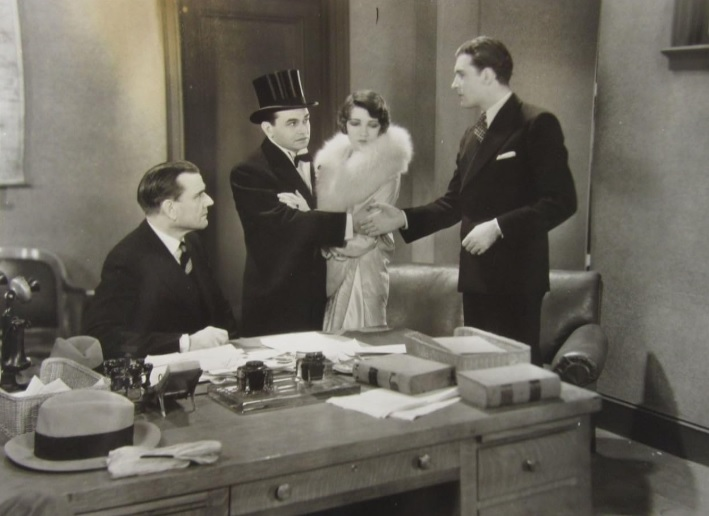
George MacQuarrie, Robinson, Claudette Colbert, and David Newell in The Hole in the Wall (1929), Robinson's first sound film.

From January to February 1927, Robinson enacted the role of Smerdiakov in the Guild's adaptation of Fyodor Dostoevsky's novel The Brothers Karamazov. His next and final role for the Guild was Ponza in Luigi Pirandello's Right You Are If You Think You Are (1927). In the summer, Robinson went to Atlantic City to play a cigar store owner in a production of Jo Swerling's The Kibitzer, the first play billed "with Edward G. Robinson." When The Kibitzer closed, he returned to Broadway and took the role of a gangster in Bartlett Cormack's The Racket, which ran for 119 performances between November 1927 and March 1928. Although he disliked the character, he later remembered, "Boy, did that play change my life. It was a smash!" The Racket was also staged at the Curran in San Francisco and the Biltmore in Los Angeles, where film studio executives saw Robinson and offered him contracts, which he turned down. In late 1928, he wore a red wig for his next Broadway role, a "maniacal masochist" in a stage adaptation of Hugh Walpole's A Man with Red Hair. Robinson accepted a $50,000 offer from film producer Walter Wanger to play a role opposite Claudette Colbert in the 1929 sound film The Hole in the Wall, filmed at Paramount's Kaufman Astoria Studios. It was his first sound film and he found he had to "develop a whole new bag of tricks", which included speaking in a lower voice, acting without exaggerated expressions, and filming a story out of continuity. Robinson later said:

I must admit I thought Hole in the Wall was going to be the stinker of all times, and I certainly did not accept the invitation to go the preview. Claudette went, and she sent me a wire: "We weren't too bad, baby. We weren't too bad. Love, Claudette."

I take her word for it. I've never seen the film.

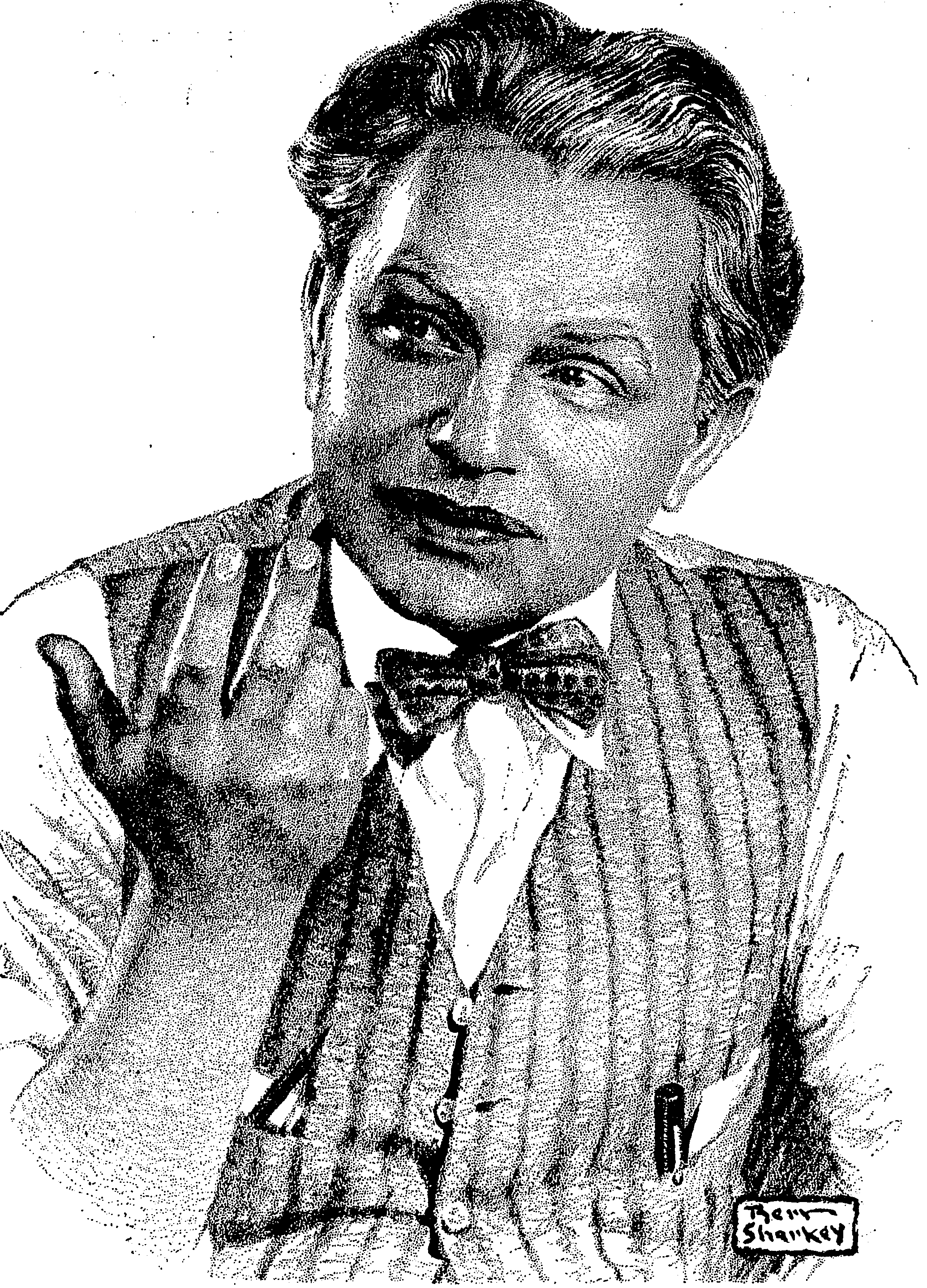
Robinson co-wrote and starred in The Kibitzer (1929), one of his Broadway successes.

Robinson helped Swerling rewrite The Kibitzer and Swerling shared the playwriting credit with him. A success, the rewritten play ran on Broadway for 120 performances from February to June 1929. Robinson later remarked, "It was also a vehicle for me. Why not? I was the coauthor, and I gave myself all the best of it. […] Every once in a while an actor finds a play that serves him well." Swerling and the play's producer, Patterson McNutt, sold the film rights to Paramount Pictures without Robinson's consent. He sued them but lost. He had a featured role in the Universal film Night Ride (1930). A. H. Woods offered Robinson star billing in a play with "junky" dialogue, which he rejected. MGM producer Irving Thalberg sent him the "beautifully written" script for the film A Lady to Love (1930). He went to California and played a 50-year-old Italian opposite top-billed Vilma Bánky as his wife. The film, directed by Victor Sjöström, was a success with audiences, but Robinson declined a three-year contract with MGM. At Universal, Robinson got second billing in Outside the Law and also replaced Jean Hersholt as Charlie Yong in East Is West (both 1930). He followed these films with eight performances as the title character in Edmond Fleg's play Mr. Samuel (originally titled Le marchand de Paris) in November 1930. Hal Wallis saw Robinson in Mr. Samuel and went backstage to inform him that Warners-First National Pictures wanted to make a deal with him. After signing a contract with the studio, Robinson played the male lead in his first film for Warners, The Widow from Chicago (1931) with Alice White.

=== Little Caesar and stardom at Warners ===
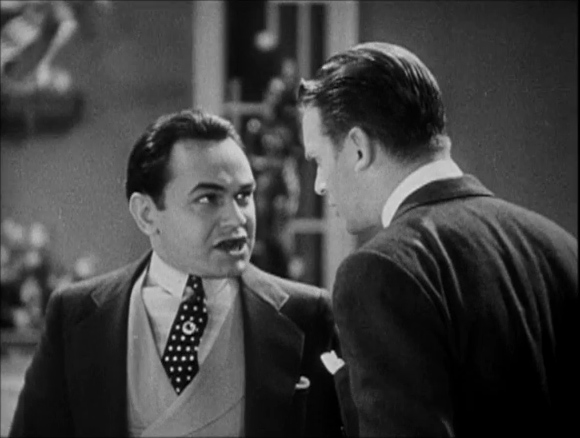
Robinson in his breakout role, Little Caesar (1931), with Douglas Fairbanks Jr.

At this point, Robinson was becoming an established film actor. What began his rise to stardom was an acclaimed portrayal of the gangster Caesar Enrico "Rico" Bandello in Little Caesar (1931) at Warner Bros. The New York Times praised his "wonderfully effective performance" and also wrote, "Little Caesar becomes at Mr. Robinson's hands a figure out of Greek epic tragedy". Hal Wallis had originally offered him the bit part of Otero, but Robinson thought he was not right for that role and did not want to play bit parts. He told Wallis, "If you're going to have me in Little Caesar as Otero, you will completely imbalance the picture. The only part I will consider playing is Little Caesar." Warners immediately cast him in another gangster film, Smart Money (1931), his only movie with James Cagney. In Smart Money, he played a barber whose weaknesses are gambling and blondes; he later said, "For the record, I am the most penny ante of gamblers and I prefer brunettes." He was reunited with Mervyn LeRoy, director of Little Caesar, in Five Star Final (1931), where he played a journalist named Randall. Five Star Final was nominated for the Academy Award for Best Picture and became one of Robinson's favorites: "I loved Randall because he wasn't a gangster. […] He made sense, and thus I'm able to say that Five Star Final is one of my favorite films."

Robinson's next two films were not among his favorites. He described The Hatchet Man (1932) as "one of my horrible memories" and Two Seconds (1932) as "a mishmash memory". He "adored" Tiger Shark (1932), a melodrama directed by Howard Hawks, because Hawks "let [him] chew the scenery" as a tuna fisherman. Warners then starred him in a "highly fictionalized" biopic he "rather liked", Silver Dollar (1932), where Robinson portrayed prospector Horace Tabor. Mary Astor was his love interest in The Little Giant (1933), a comedy about a beer baron who tries to enter high society. Astor was one of Robinson's favorite leading ladies: "She had then all the attributes that make for greatness in an actress: beauty, poise, experience, talent, and, above all, she did her homework. She has been vastly underrated, and it's a great pity." He disliked the script for his next film, I Loved a Woman (1933), and managed to have it rewritten. Robinson thought Kay Francis, his co-star, "had that indefinable presence that somehow enabled her to be convincing as well as beautiful." He "loathed" Dark Hazard (1934) but enjoyed making The Man with Two Faces (1934) because he was reunited with Astor and had the opportunity to "use a putty nose, a set of whiskers, false eyebrows, and a French accent."

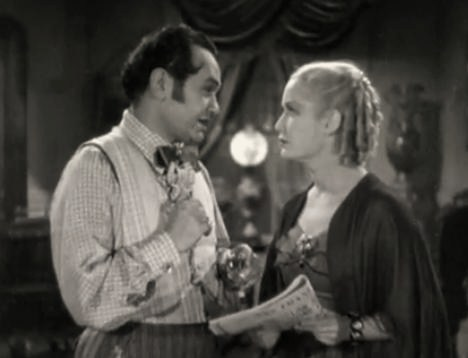
Robinson and Miriam Hopkins in Barbary Coast (1935).

Warners loaned Robinson to Columbia for the John Ford-directed comedy The Whole Town's Talking (1935), which was based on a novel written by W. R. Burnett, the author of Little Caesar. He played two characters in the film: a notorious murderer and a clerk who resembles him. Robinson called Ford "the consummate professional" and "a totally remarkable director". He also said it "was a delight to work with and to know" Jean Arthur, his leading lady in The Whole Town's Talking. Sam Goldwyn borrowed him for the historical Western film Barbary Coast (1935), directed by Hawks and co-starring Miriam Hopkins. Robinson later wrote that working with Hopkins was "a horror": "I tried to work with her. She made no effort whatever to work with me." Although she was always late and uncooperative, Hopkins agreed to act without her shoes whenever she had a scene with Robinson, who disliked the idea of standing on a box to look taller. Tired of Hopkins' unprofessionalism, Robinson eventually confronted her and told her off in front of the cast and crew. After that, Robinson and Hopkins had to play a slap scene and she told him, "Eddie, let's do this right. You smack me now so we won't have to do it over and over again. Do you hear me, Eddie? Smack me hard." The slap was so loud everyone heard it and applauded.

Back at Warner Bros., Robinson agreed to play a detective in Bullets or Ballots (1936) only after small changes were made to the screenplay. Warners then sent him to Britain for the role of a salesman in the comedy Thunder in the City (1937). The British producers allowed Robinson to change the script and he asked Robert E. Sherwood to rewrite it. Sherwood turned it into a satire, but the film was not successful. Robinson starred as the title character's promoter in the boxing drama Kid Galahad (1937), with Bette Davis as his leading lady and Humphrey Bogart in a supporting role. Davis' acting style did not impress him when they made the film: "Miss Davis was, when I played with her, not a very gifted amateur and employed any number of jarring mannerisms that she used to form an image. In her early period Miss Davis played the image, and not herself, and certainly not the character provided by the author." Robinson turned down several scripts at Warners before MGM borrowed him for the title role in The Last Gangster (1937), featuring James Stewart and "the compelling" Rose Stradner. He returned to Warners and approved of his next two assignments: the "very funny" comedy A Slight Case of Murder (1938), for which he received good notices from critics, and The Amazing Dr. Clitterhouse (1938), in which he played the title role, which had been originated on stage by Sir Cedric Hardwicke. Robinson accepted an offer from Columbia to star in I Am the Law (1938) as a professor who becomes a prosecutor. He later described the film as "a potboiler, but at least I was on the right side of the law for once and survived; up to now, it seemed to me, I had died in every picture."

=== World War II ===
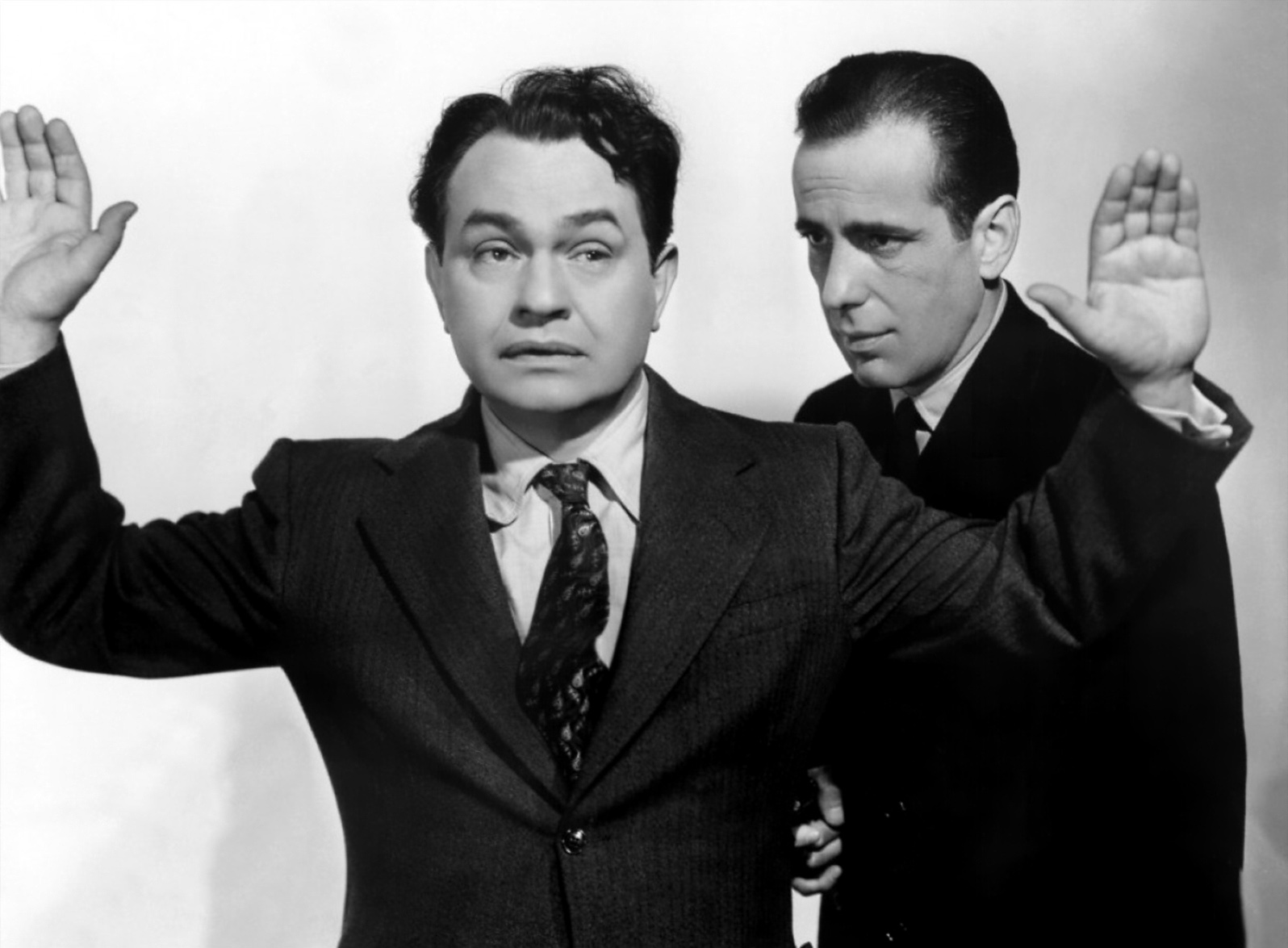
Robinson and Humphrey Bogart in Brother Orchid (1940).

At the time World War II broke out in Europe, Robinson played an FBI agent in Confessions of a Nazi Spy (1939), the first American film that portrayed Nazism as a threat to the United States. MGM borrowed him for the lead role in the financially successful drama Blackmail (1939). Then, to avoid being typecast, Robinson portrayed the biomedical scientist and Nobel laureate Paul Ehrlich in the biopic Dr. Ehrlich's Magic Bullet (1940). He later said, "Among all the plays and films in which I've appeared, I'm proudest of my role in Dr. Ehrlich's Magic Bullet. […] It was, I think, one of the most distinguished performances I've ever given." Robinson also portrayed entrepreneur Paul Julius Reuter in A Dispatch from Reuters (1940), his second-favorite film. Both films were biographies of prominent Jewish public figures. In between, Robinson played a gangster who goes to a monastery in the comedy Brother Orchid (1940), featuring Humphrey Bogart and Ann Sothern. According to Robinson, he and Bogart "got along splendidly" and "respected each other."

Robinson portrayed the villainous Wolf Larsen in the 1941 film adaptation of the Jack London novel The Sea Wolf, co-starring John Garfield and Ida Lupino. He thought Garfield "was one of the best young actors I ever encountered". Robinson followed The Sea Wolf with a top-billed role opposite Marlene Dietrich and George Raft in Manpower (1941). In his autobiography, he remembered Dietrich's professionalism: "Playing with her, I learned that we shared a common passion: work. More than that: Be on time, know the lines, toe the marks, say the words, be ready for anything." Although he described Manpower as mostly "inane", Robinson considered that he and Dietrich were a "stunning combination" and that adding Raft as the third lead was "showmanship casting." He found Raft to be "touchy, difficult, thoroughly impossible to play with"; Robinson wanted to leave the film when Raft punched him, but Hal Wallis convinced him to stay. He went to MGM for Unholy Partners (1942), a film he thought was "best forgotten", and returned to Warners for the comedy Larceny, Inc. (1942). He volunteered for military service in June 1942 but was disqualified as he was aged 48; he was an active and vocal critic of fascism and Nazism during the war.

=== Post-Warner Bros. ===
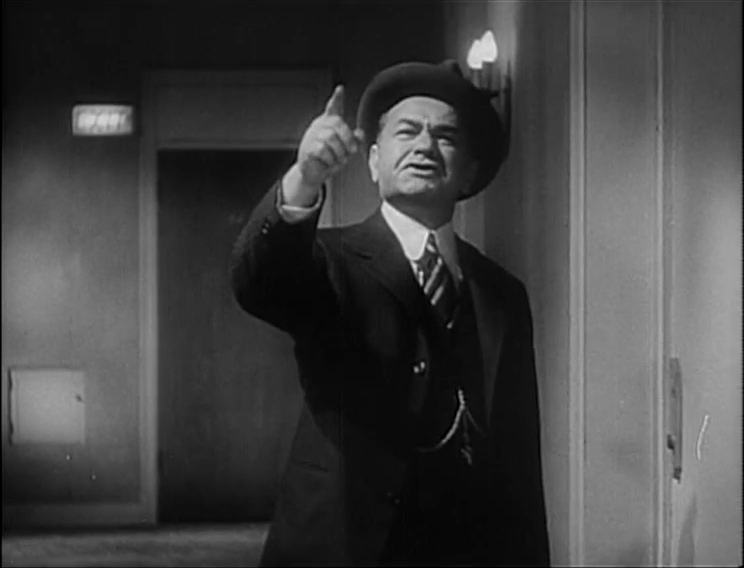
Robinson in Billy Wilder's Double Indemnity (1944).

Robinson was one of several stars in the 20th Century-Fox anthology film Tales of Manhattan (1942), where he played a role in one of the five stories. He opined that his next four films were "at the very best, trivial": the Universal anthology film Flesh and Fantasy (1943), the Columbia war drama Destroyer (1943), the Fox war drama Tampico (1944), and the Columbia war comedy Mr. Winkle Goes to War (1944). At Paramount, he co-starred with Fred MacMurray and Barbara Stanwyck in one of his favorite films, Billy Wilder's Double Indemnity (1944), where his riveting soliloquy on insurance actuarial tables (written by Raymond Chandler) is considered one of the most memorable moments of his career. He played the third leading role in Double Indemnity: "I debated accepting it; Emanuel Goldenberg told me that at my age it was time to begin thinking of character roles, to slide into middle and old age with the same grace as that marvelous actor Lewis Stone." He then went to RKO to play the top-billed role of a college professor who befriends Joan Bennett in Fritz Lang's The Woman in the Window (1944), featuring Dan Duryea in a supporting role. Robinson remembered Lang as "one of the greats in his declining period." Robinson, Bennett, and Duryea were reunited in another Lang film, Scarlet Street (1945), where Robinson played a married painter in love with Bennett. He did not like Scarlet Street: "[I] hastened to finish it, so monotonous was the story and the character I played."

At MGM, Robinson played a Norwegian farmer in the drama Our Vines Have Tender Grapes (1945), and then he went to RKO for another top-billed role in Orson Welles' The Stranger (1946), a thriller co-starring Loretta Young and Welles. About The Stranger, he said, "Orson has genius, but in this film it seemed to have run out. It was bloodless, and so was I." Robinson followed it with another thriller, The Red House (1947), "a moody piece" he co-produced with Sol Lesser. He was "inordinately proud of" his next film, All My Sons (1948), an adaptation of Arthur Miller's play of the same title. Robinson received second billing as the gangster Johnny Rocco in John Huston's Key Largo (1948), the last of five films that he made with Humphrey Bogart, and the only one in which Robinson played a supporting role to Bogart's character in the film. It is also the only film with Bogart where Bogart's character killed Robinson's character in a gunfight, instead of the opposite. Robinson later wrote, "Second billing or no, I got the star treatment because [Bogart] insisted upon it—not in words but in action. When asked to come on the set, he would ask: 'Is Mr. Robinson ready?' He'd come to my trailer dressing room to get me." Around the same time, he played top-billed starring roles in Night Has a Thousand Eyes (1948), which he described as "unadulterated hokum that I did for the money", and House of Strangers (1949), which he "loved". Robinson had a cameo appearance in It's a Great Feeling (1949) and went to England to play the father in the British drama My Daughter Joy (1950), retitled Operation X in the United States.

=== Graylisting, TV, and The Ten Commandments ===
Robinson found it hard to get work after his graylisting and referred to this period as "the 'B' picture phase of my career as a movie star". He got top billing in modest-budget films: Actors and Sin (1952), co-starring Eddie Albert and Marsha Hunt; Vice Squad (1953), with brief appearances by second-billed co-star Paulette Goddard; Big Leaguer (1953), co-starring Vera-Ellen; The Glass Web (1953), co-starring John Forsythe and Marcia Henderson; and Black Tuesday (1954), featuring Peter Graves and Jean Parker. In 1953, Robinson made his television debut with a live performance in the Lux Video Theatre episode "Witness for the Prosecution", which aired on September 17. He also starred in the Climax! episode "Epitaph for a Spy" (1954), a television version of Eric Ambler's novel of the same title. His next television appearance was as a business executive in the Ford Theatre episode "... and Son" (1955). He accepted third billing and played Barbara Stanwyck's husband in The Violent Men (1955), co-starring Glenn Ford. He had a role as an attorney in the well-received Tight Spot (1955), but top billing went to Ginger Rogers. Although Robinson received top billing in A Bullet for Joey (1955), George Raft played the leading role in that film. Top-billed, he played attorneys in the Celebrity Playhouse episode "For the Defense" (1955) and the Warners Bros. film Illegal (1955), featuring Nina Foch and Hugh Marlowe. He played an ex-mobster in his second Ford Theatre episode, "A Set of Values" (1955). He co-starred with top-billed Alan Ladd in Hell on Frisco Bay (1956) and played the top-billed role in the psychological thriller Nightmare (1956). He later described these films as "the series of program movies that I did for the money and something to do, my own self-esteem decreasing by the hour."

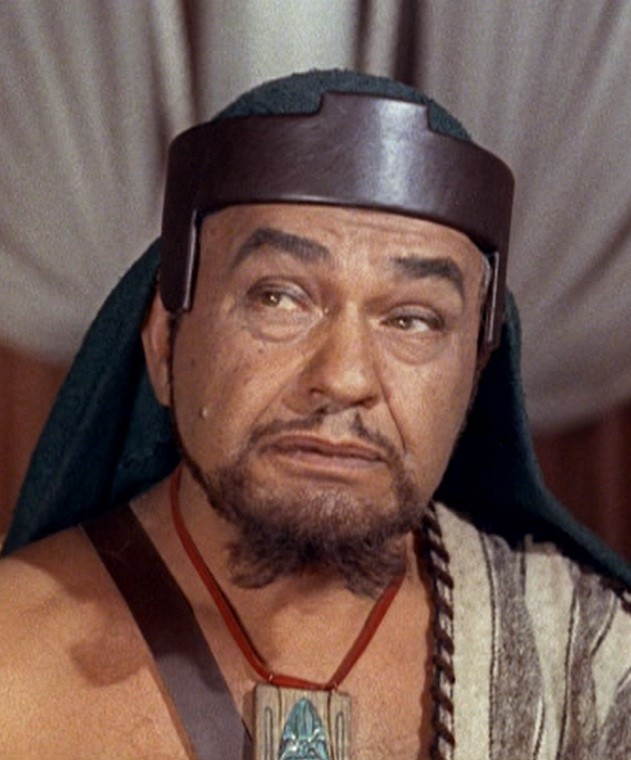
Robinson as Dathan in Cecil B. DeMille's The Ten Commandments (1956).

Robinson career's rehabilitation received a boost when the anti-communist film director Cecil B. DeMille cast him as Dathan, the Hebrew overseer who becomes the governor of Goshen, in his 1956 version of The Ten Commandments, the most expensive film up to that time. DeMille signed Robinson for the role in September 1954. He received fourth star billing after Charlton Heston, Yul Brynner, and Anne Baxter. In his autobiography, Robinson remembered:

The top directors and producers wouldn't have me and while I'm grateful to those who did in the period and bow low to them for their guts, what I needed was recognition again by a top figure in the industry. I've already mentioned the name of that top figure—Cecil B. DeMille.

No more conservative or patriarchal figure existed in Hollywood, no one more opposed to communism or any permutation or combinations thereof. And no fairer one, no man with a greater sense of decency and justice. I'm told that when the part of Dathan was discussed in his new Ten Commandments, somebody suggested that I would be ideal but that under the circumstances I was, of course, unacceptable. Mr. DeMille wanted to know why, coldly reviewed the matter, felt I had been done an injustice, and told his people to offer me the part.

Cecil B. DeMille returned me to films. Cecil B. DeMille restored my self-respect.

Olive Deering, Robinson, and Charlton Heston, in The Ten Commandments.

Heston said Robinson was "extraordinary" in the "difficult" role of Dathan, a composite of all the Israelites who rebel against Moses in the Book of Exodus. Jesse L. Lasky Jr., one of the screenwriters of The Ten Commandments, also praised Robinson's acting: "At the end of a long film, to sway this multitude by one speech, to turn them, from an inspired host marching to freedom with God and Prophet into carousing, faithless sinners, required a magic performance. […] Eddie accomplished the impossible with the reading of that speech." Robinson later told Lasky, "You gave me the greatest exit a 'heavy' ever had. No actor would break friendship with a writer who created a tempest, then an earthquake, then opened a fissure and had me fall through into hell. Even in Little Caesar I never had an exit as good as that!" In 1957, Robinson was honored by the Maryland State Council of the American Jewish Congress with a special award for his performance in The Ten Commandments.

=== Broadway return and supporting roles ===
Before The Ten Commandments was released, Robinson returned to the Broadway stage for the first time in 26 years. He starred as the middle-aged manufacturer who falls in love with a younger woman, played by Gena Rowlands, in Paddy Chayefsky's romantic play Middle of the Night. Produced and directed by Joshua Logan, the Broadway production ran for 477 performances between February 1956 and May 1957. Robinson's role in Middle of the Night earned him a 1956 Tony Award nomination for Best Actor in a Play. In 1958, he starred in the Playhouse 90 episode "Shadows Tremble", playing the part of a retired manufacturer who seeks acceptance in a small town. Robinson had a second-billed part as Frank Sinatra's brother in Frank Capra's comedy film A Hole in the Head (1959). In 1959, he appeared as the chairman of the board of a textile firm in Goodyear Theatre episode "A Good Name", and worked with his son Edward G. Robinson Jr. in "Heritage", an episode of Dick Powell's Zane Grey Theatre.

Robinson in the film The Outrage (1964).

Robinson was top billed as one of the title characters in Seven Thieves (1960), co-starring Rod Steiger, Joan Collins, and Eli Wallach. That same year, he portrayed US president Theodore Roosevelt in the episodic television film The Right Man. He went to Japan to play a film producer in the Paramount comedy film My Geisha (1962), starring Shirley MacLaine. In Two Weeks in Another Town (1962), he was reunited with his Key Largo co-star Claire Trevor: "For what I did in Key Largo I'm paying now. In it I batted Claire Trevor all around the premises. So what happens now? She's playing my domineering wife in this film and I'm on the receiving end of slaps and kicks. That gal Claire has a memory, too! She asks the director for plenty of rehearsals!" In June 1962, Robinson suffered a heart attack while filming Sammy Going South (1963) in Kenya. Of his character in The Prize (1963), he said, "He is a German scientist who comes to this country and wins a Nobel prize. He's kindly, thoughtful and generous. […] In the end I play a double role—and the other part is one of the heaviest you'll ever see in a movie." He returned to Warners for the cameo role of Big Jim in Robin and the 7 Hoods (1964). In Good Neighbor Sam (1964), he was billed as a guest star and played the role of Mr. Nurdlinger, the owner of a dairy company. When Spencer Tracy fell ill, Robinson took over the role of Carl Shurz in John Ford's Cheyenne Autumn (1964). He was cast as one of the three narrators in The Outrage (1964), an American remake of the Japanese film Rashomon. Associated Press reporter Bob Thomas wrote that Robinson was "especially [fine] as the con man. His performance might well draw an Academy Award that is long overdue." Thomas later listed Robinson as a possible nominee for the Academy Award for Best Supporting Actor for The Outrage.

Robinson was second-billed, under Steve McQueen, with his name above the title, in The Cincinnati Kid (1965). It was the second time he replaced Spencer Tracy, who thought the part was too small. Robinson played the role of Lancey Howard, "the reigning champ of the stud poker tables": "That man on the screen, more than in any other picture I ever made, was Edward G. Robinson with great patches of Emanuel Goldenberg showing through. He was all cold and discerning and unflappable on the exterior; he was aging and full of self-doubt on the inside." For his work in The Cincinnati Kid, he won the Laurel Award for Topliner Male Supporting Performance. Robinson was top-billed in The Blonde from Peking. He also appeared in Grand Slam (1967), starring Janet Leigh and Klaus Kinski.

Robinson was originally cast in the role of Dr. Zaius in Planet of the Apes (1968) and he even went so far as to film a screen test with Charlton Heston. However, Robinson dropped out of the project before its production began due to heart problems and concerns over the long hours that he would have needed to spend under the heavy ape makeup. He was replaced by Maurice Evans.

=== Final appearances and tributes ===
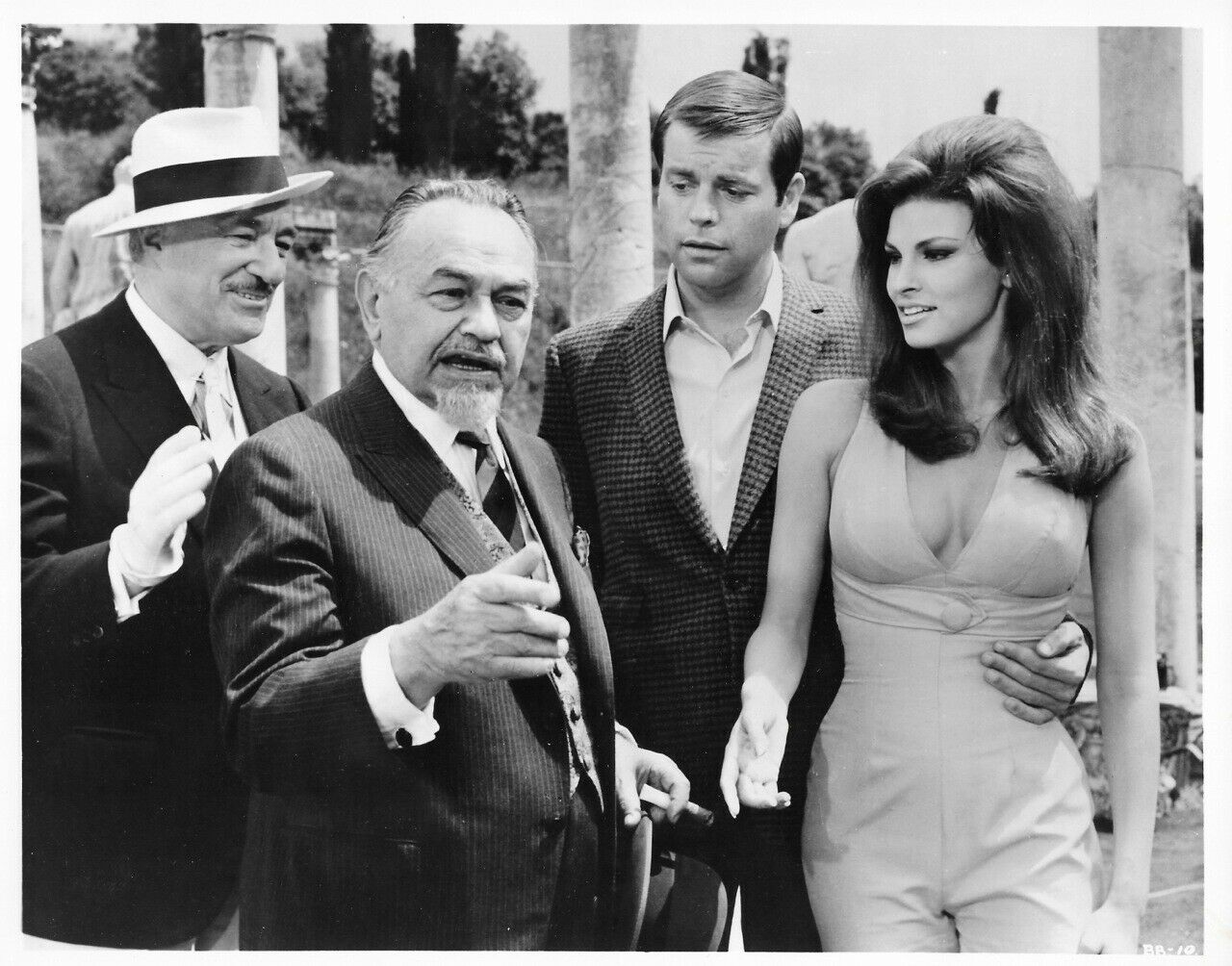
Vittorio De Sica, Robinson, Robert Wagner, and Raquel Welch in The Biggest Bundle of Them All (1968).

His later appearances included The Biggest Bundle of Them All (1968) starring Robert Wagner and Raquel Welch, Never a Dull Moment (1968) with Dick Van Dyke, It's Your Move (1968), Mackenna's Gold (1969) starring Gregory Peck and Omar Sharif, and the Night Gallery episode "The Messiah on Mott Street" (1971).

Heston, as president of the Screen Actors Guild, presented Robinson with its annual award in 1969, "in recognition of his pioneering work in organizing the union, his service during World War II, and his 'outstanding achievement in fostering the finest ideals of the acting profession.'"

Robinson traveled to Israel to play a role in the film Neither by Day nor by Night (1972). The last scene that Robinson filmed was a euthanasia sequence, with his friend and co-star Charlton Heston, in the science fiction film Soylent Green (1973); he died 84 days later.

Robinson was never nominated for an Academy Award. In a 1972 article for The Los Angeles Times, he said, "It never really bothered me. Unlike some actors, I think the Oscars are a wonderful thing. I would have liked winning one, but maybe I'm not the type." In his autobiography he wrote, "For me to say I wouldn't accept it would certainly be a case of refusing something never offered; for me to say I would, would be to ask for something I've never been tendered."

In 1973, the Academy of Motion Picture Arts and Sciences voted Robinson an honorary Oscar in recognition that he had "achieved greatness as a player, a patron of the arts and a dedicated citizen ... in sum, a Renaissance man". Daniel Taradash, president of the Academy, sent Leonard Spigelgass an unmarked Oscar and told him to tell Robinson of the honor. Spigelgass went to the hospital and informed Robinson about the award: "He waved his hand in denial and refutation. Then I showed him the Oscar and said, 'Eddie, have I ever lied to you?' He shook his head and held the Oscar tightly to him and wept softly." He died two months before the award ceremony took place, so the award was accepted by his widow, Jane Robinson. Hollywood columnist Dorothy Manners observed, "And the long-delayed tribute to Edward G. Robinson (amazingly enough, this very fine actor had never even received a nomination from the Academy during his lifetime) was a beautiful moment."

=== Radio ===
From 1937 to 1942, Robinson starred as Steve Wilson, editor of the Illustrated Press, in the newspaper drama Big Town. He also portrayed hardboiled detective Sam Spade for a Lux Radio Theatre adaptation of The Maltese Falcon. During the 1940s he performed on CBS Radio's "Cadena de las Américas" network broadcasts to South America in collaboration with Nelson Rockefeller's cultural diplomacy program at the U.S. State Department's Office of the Coordinator of Inter-American Affairs.

== Political activism ==
During the 1930s, Robinson was an outspoken public critic of fascism and Nazism, donating more than $250,000 to 850 political and charitable organizations between 1939 and 1949. He was host to the Committee of 56, which gathered at his home on December 9, 1938, signing a "Declaration of Democratic Independence," which called for a boycott of all German-made products. After the Nazi invasion of the Soviet Union, while he was not a supporter of Communism, he appeared at Soviet war relief rallies in order to give moral aid to America's new ally, which he said could join "together in their hatred of Hitlerism".

Although he attempted to enlist in the military when the United States formally entered World War II, he was unable to do so because of his age; instead, the Office of War Information appointed him as a Special Representative based in London. From there, taking advantage of his multilingual skills, he delivered radio addresses in over six languages to European countries that had fallen under Nazi domination. His talent as a radio speaker in the U.S. had previously been recognized by the American Legion, which had given him an award for his "outstanding contribution to Americanism through his stirring patriotic appeals". Robinson was also an active member of the Hollywood Democratic Committee, serving on its executive board in 1944, during which time he became an "enthusiastic" campaigner for Roosevelt's reelection that same year. During the 1940s, Robinson also contributed to the cultural diplomacy initiatives of Roosevelt's Office of the Coordinator of Inter-American Affairs in support of Pan-Americanism through his broadcasts to South America on the CBS "Cadena de las Américas" radio network.

In early July 1944, less than a month after the Invasion of Normandy by Allied forces, Robinson traveled to Normandy to entertain the troops, becoming the first movie star to go there for the USO. He personally donated US$100,000 (equal to $1,828,922 today) to the USO. After returning to the U.S., he continued his active involvement in the war effort by going to shipyards and defense plants in order to inspire workers, and appearing at rallies to help sell war bonds. After the war ended, Robinson publicly spoke out in support of democratic rights for all Americans, especially in demanding equality for Black workers in the workplace. He endorsed the Fair Employment Practices Commission's call to end workplace discrimination. Black leaders praised him as "one of the great friends of the Negro and a great advocator of Democracy". Robinson also campaigned for the civil rights of African Americans, helping many to overcome segregation and discrimination.

During the years when Robinson spoke out against fascism and Nazism, he was not a supporter of Communism, but he did not criticize the Soviet Union, which he saw as an ally against Hitler. However, according to the film historian Steven J. Ross "activists who attacked Hitler without simultaneously attacking Stalin were vilified by conservative critics as either Communists, Communist dupes, or, at best, as naïve liberal dupes." In addition, Robinson learned that 11 out of the more than 850 charities and groups that he had helped over the previous decade were listed as Communist front organizations by the FBI. As a result, he was called to testify in front of the House Un-American Activities Committee (HUAC) in 1950 and 1952, and he was also threatened with blacklisting.

As shown in the full House Un-American Activities Committee transcript for April 30, 1952, Robinson repudiated some of the organizations that he had belonged to in the 1930s and 1940s. and stated that he felt he had been duped or made use of unawares "by the sinister forces who were members, and probably in important positions in these [front] organizations." When asked whom he personally knew who might have "duped" him, he replied, "Well, you had Albert Maltz, and you have Dalton Trumbo, and you have ... John Howard Lawson. I knew Frank Tuttle. I didn't know [Edward] Dmytryk at all. There are the Buchmans, that I know, Sidney Buchman and all that sort of thing. It never entered my mind that any of these people were Communists." Despite accusing these persons of being duplicitous towards him about their political aims, Robinson never directly accused anyone of being a Communist. His own name was cleared, but in the aftermath, his career noticeably suffered; he was offered smaller roles infrequently. In October 1952, he wrote an article titled "How the Reds made a Sucker Out of Me", and it was published in the American Legion Magazine. The chair of the committee, Francis E. Walter, told Robinson at the end of his testimonies that the Committee "never had any evidence presented to indicate that you were anything more than a very choice sucker."

== Personal life ==
In 1917, Robinson fell in love with actress Pauline Lord when he worked with her in the play The Deluge. He remembered, "She was the first woman I ever proposed to. 'Oh, Eddie,' she said, 'you could knock me over with a feather.' Which I had to assume meant 'No!' It did little for my self-esteem."

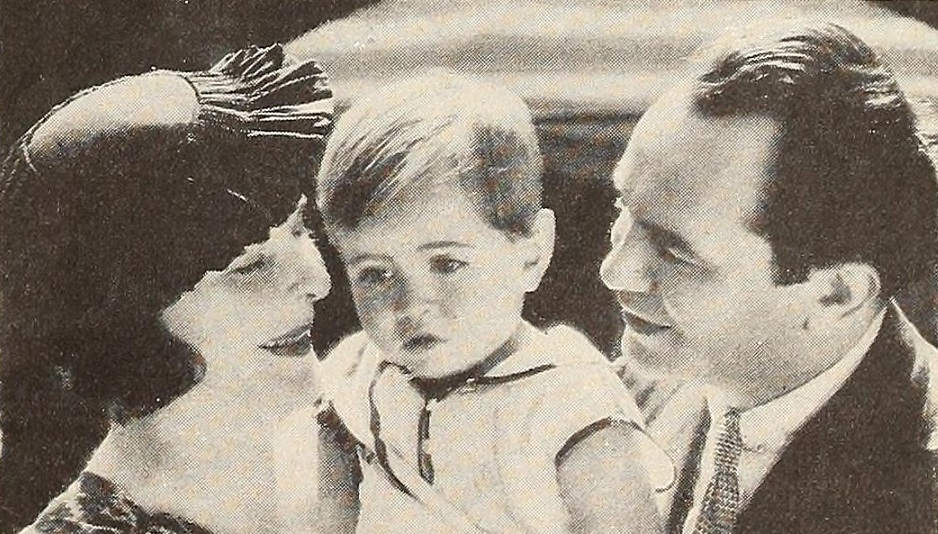
Gladys Lloyd Robinson and Edward G. Robinson with their son, Edward Jr., in 1935.

In the mid-1920s, Robinson met stage actress Gladys Lloyd at an after-theater party. He later said, "What I felt when I first saw her has to be described in the phrasing that was not then cliché: I thought her a vision of loveliness. Tall, beautiful, aristocratic, contained, groomed, witty, and with natural charm Gladys was." They were married in 1927. They appeared together in two Broadway plays, Henry Behave (1926) and Mr. Samuel (1930), and Gladys also played small roles in Robinson's films Smart Money, Five Star Final, The Hatchet Man, and Two Seconds. The couple had a son, Edward G. Robinson Jr. (1933–1974), known as Manny, and a daughter from Gladys Robinson's first marriage. The couple divorced in 1956.

In 1958, Robinson married Jane Bodenheimer, a dress designer professionally known as Jane Adler. They lived in Palm Springs, California.

In contrast to the gangsters he portrayed in film, Robinson was a soft-spoken and cultured man. In addition to English and Romanian, he spoke Hebrew, Yiddish, German, French, Italian, and Spanish. He was a passionate art collector, eventually building up a significant private collection. In 1956, however, he was forced to sell his collection to pay for his divorce settlement with Gladys Robinson; his finances had also suffered due to underemployment in the early 1950s. He sold the collection for $3 million to the Greek shipping magnate Stavros Niarchos.

== Death ==
Robinson died of bladder cancer at Cedars Sinai Hospital in Los Angeles on January 26, 1973, just weeks after finishing Soylent Green, and months before he was to be given an honorary Academy Award later that year. He was 79. Services were conducted at Temple Israel in Los Angeles where Charlton Heston delivered the eulogy. More than 1,500 friends of Robinson attended, with another 500 people outside. His body was flown to New York where it was entombed in a crypt in his family's mausoleum at Beth-El Cemetery in Queens. His pallbearers were Jack L. Warner, Hal B. Wallis, Mervyn Leroy, George Burns, Sam Jaffe, Frank Sinatra, Jack Karp and Alan Simpson.

== Awards and honors ==
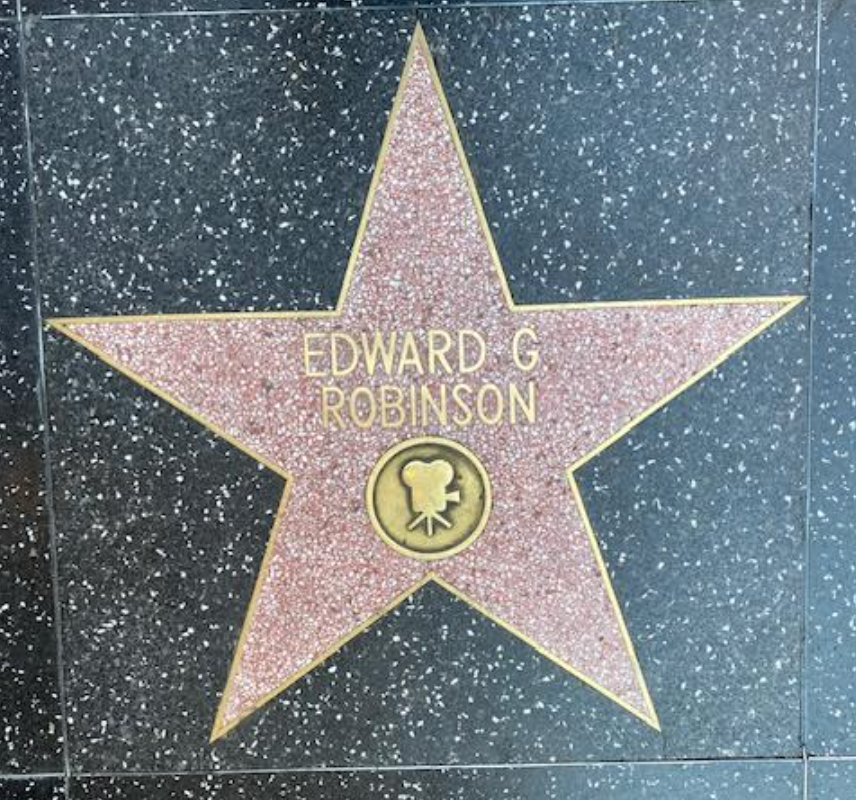
Robinson's star on the Hollywood Walk of Fame.

- Motion Picture Producers' Association listed his role in Silver Dollar in its Ten Best Performances of 1932
- Best Actor of February 1940 for Dr. Ehrlich's Magic Bullet in Hollywood Reporter's poll of correspondents
- Best Actor of 1940 for Dr. Ehrlich's Magic Bullet in the National Intercollegiate Film Critics' Association poll
- 1941 American Legion's Citation of Honor for "outstanding contribution to Americanism" via his radio program, Big Town
- 1941 Best Film Player on the Air in Motion Picture Daily's radio popularity poll
- 1941 National Safety Council Annual Special Award Plaque for Big Town and in recognition of "outstanding contribution to the cause of safe driving"
- The National Board of Review's Committee on Exceptional Photoplays included Robinson's role in Tales of Manhattan in a list of "screen performances worthy of special praise"
- Louisville Courier Journal's No. 1 Male Actor of 1944 for Double Indemnity
- 1949 Cannes Film Festival Award for Best Actor for House of Strangers
- 1956 Tony Award nomination for Best Actor in a Play for Middle of the Night
- 1956 Lambs Award for Middle of the Night
- 1957 special award from the American Jewish Congress for his performance in The Ten Commandments
- 1957 Justice Louis D. Brandeis Medal for "service to humanity"
- 1960 Motion Picture Star on the Hollywood Walk of Fame
- 1964 Groshire-Austin Leeds Fashion Award in the category of straight drama
- 1965 City College of New York James K. Hackett Medal for "excellence in oratory or drama"
- 1966 Laurel Award for Topliner Male Supporting Performance for The Cincinnati Kid (1965)
- 1969 Screen Actors Guild Life Achievement Award
- 1971 TV Scout Award nomination for Best Actor for The Old Man Who Cried Wolf (1970)
- 1973 Academy Honorary Award (posthumous)
  Thank you, Chuck. My husband knew he was to be honored tonight and he prepared his thanks. May I read what he wrote: "It couldn't have come at a better time in a man's life. Had it come earlier it would have aroused deep feelings in me; still, not so deep as now. I am very grateful to my rich, warm, creative, talented, intimate colleagues who have been my life's associates. How much richer can you be?" Thank you for Eddie.
  — Jane Robinson, at the 45th Academy Awards

== In popular culture ==
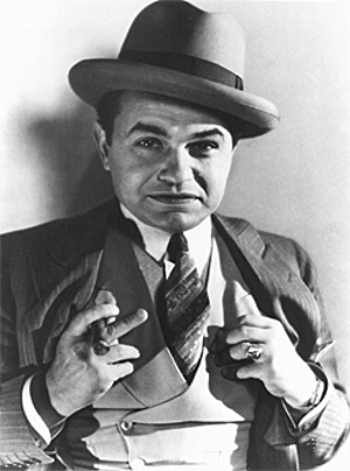
Robinson as a gangster in Little Caesar (1931)

In October 2000, Robinson's image was imprinted on a U.S. postage stamp, the sixth in its Legends of Hollywood series.

Robinson has been the inspiration for a number of animated television characters, usually caricatures of his most distinctive 'snarling gangster' guise. An early version of the gangster character Rocky, featured in the Bugs Bunny cartoon Racketeer Rabbit, shared his likeness. This version of the character also appears briefly in Justice League, in the episode "Comfort and Joy", as an alien with Robinson's face and non-human body, who hovers past the screen as a background character.

Similar caricatures also appeared in The Coo-Coo Nut Grove, Thugs with Dirty Mugs and Hush My Mouse. Another character based on Robinson's tough-guy image was The Frog (Chauncey "Flat Face" Frog) from the cartoon series Courageous Cat and Minute Mouse. The voice of B.B. Eyes in The Dick Tracy Show was based on Robinson, with Mel Blanc and Jerry Hausner sharing voicing duties. The Wacky Races animated series character 'Clyde' from the Ant Hill Mob was based on Robinson's Little Caesar persona.

Voice actor Hank Azaria has noted that the voice of Simpsons character police chief Clancy Wiggum is an impression of Robinson.

Robinson was portrayed by actor Michael Stuhlbarg in the 2015 biographical drama film Trumbo.

== See also ==
- List of posthumous Academy Award winners and nominees
