= Horace Hahn =

American actor

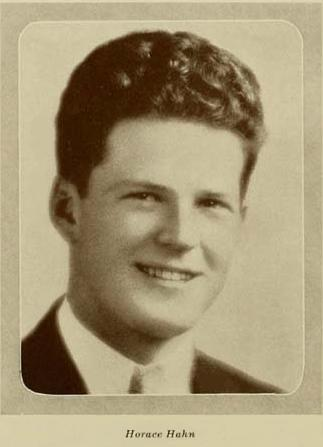
- Los Angeles High School yearbook photo taken the year he appeared in the film This Day and Age (1933).
- Born: July 23, 1915; Colorado, United States
- Died: January 31, 2003 (aged 87); San Diego, California, United States

Horace L. Hahn (July 23, 1915 – January 31, 2003) was an American actor best known for working with Cecil B. DeMille on several films as a young man, including a supporting role in This Day and Age (1933). He also served in the Office of Strategic Services (OSS) during World War II, and assisted Justice Robert H. Jackson as an interrogator in connection with the prosecution of Nazi war criminals at the Nuremberg Trials.

== Early life ==
Hahn was born in Colorado in 1915 to William L. and Masie Hahn. William Hahn was the Maytag Corporation representative in Denver. The family later moved to Los Angeles, California, where William Hahn founded the Maytag West Company, which later became a subsidiary of the Maytag Corporation. Horace's mother died when he was quite young and he was later adopted by his father's second wife, Lois. He attended John Burroughs Middle School and Los Angeles High School, where he placed first in the citywide Shakespeare Competition in 1932, and was the winner of the Herald Oratorical Contest in 1933. He then attended the University of California, Los Angeles, where he was the national forensic debate champion, graduating with an A.B. in Political Science. After graduating from Stanford Law School, he embarked on a national speaking tour with Helen Gahagan Douglas, the wife of actor Melvyn Douglas. Gahagan Douglas was elected to the United States House of Representatives from California's 14th congressional district as a liberal Democrat in 1944, and served three full terms. In 1950, Gahagan Douglas ran for the United States Senate against Republican U.S. Representative Richard M. Nixon. In the race against Nixon, Gahagan Douglas coined a nickname for Nixon that became one of the most recognized in American politics: "Tricky Dick".

== Acting and film career ==
Hahn acted in numerous Shakespeare stage productions during his years at Los Angeles High School, UCLA, and Stanford Law School. Hahn also worked with Cecil B. DeMille on several films, including This Day and Age (1933), where he played the part of the student body president (at the time, Hahn was senior class president at Los Angeles High School). In his book Cecil B. DeMille's Hollywood, author Robert S. Birchard relates how DeMille wasn't sure screenwriter Bartlett Cormack's script had a sense of current slang, so he asked high school student Hahn to read the script and comment. Today we often laugh at the "Gee, that's swell" dialogue of early 1930s films but, according to Hahn at least, this was the way he and his fellow students talked. He wrote DeMille that the majority of the dialogue in Cormack's script was "really not typical of high school students. [It] Should be interspersed with a few exclamations like, 'heck' — 'gosh' — 'gee,' etc" Hahn also suggested that in Steve's speech about the murdered tailor the writer add: "Gosh, he was swell to us fellows." While attending high school and college Hahn was asked to review additional scripts, and helped out backstage on other films by DeMille, along with his close friend and classmate Buck Houghton.

== Service in World War II ==
Hahn was commissioned as an officer in the United States Army in 1942. He was recruited into the Office of Strategic Services (OSS) by Maj. Gen. William J. "Wild Bill" Donovan, a New York antitrust attorney before the war, who founded the OSS.

In July 1942 Donovan obtained the approval of General George C. Marshall, the Army's chief of staff, to form units of bilingual volunteers that would organize and supply guerrilla bands, gather intelligence, and carry out commando operations behind enemy lines. These men formed cells, each containing two sections of two officers and thirteen enlisted men, although the actual size of the teams in the field would vary greatly. Primarily infantrymen and demolitions experts, they also contained medical technicians and radio operators.

Hahn parachuted behind enemy lines into Czechoslovakia, and later received an award from the Czechoslovak Government in exile for his services in capturing a Nazi gauleiter in that country.

== Nuremberg War Trials ==
One source identifies Hahn as the chief attorney for Justice Robert H. Jackson during the Nuremberg Trials. Another source states that Hahn aided Justice Jackson. Jackson had several assistants at the Nuremberg Trials, including Colonel Telford Taylor, who was the U.S. prosecutor in the High Command case. The indictment in this case called for the General Staff of the Army and the High Command of the German Armed Forces to be considered criminal organizations; the witnesses were several of the surviving German Field Marshals and their staff officers.

Captain Hahn conducted interrogations, including that of colonel of the Luftwaffe Bernd von Brauchitsch, who served on the staff of Reich Marshal Hermann Göring. Justice Jackson referred to Hahn's interrogation during the cross examination of Colonel von Brauchitsch. Colonel von Brauchitsch was interrogated by Hahn about the deaths of 50 Allied Air Force officers who were supposedly shot trying to escape. This incident was portrayed in the film The Great Escape (1963), an American film starring Steve McQueen about an escape by Allied prisoners of war from a German POW camp during World War II. The film was based on the book The Great Escape by Paul Brickhill, which is a novelization of the true story of a mass escape from Stalag Luft III.

When Justice Jackson resigned his position as prosecutor after the first (and only) trial before the IMT and returned to the U.S., Colonel Telford Taylor was promoted to brigadier general and succeeded him on October 17, 1946, as chief counsel for the remaining twelve trials before the U.S. Nuremberg Military Tribunals. In these trials at Nuremberg, 163 of the 200 defendants who were tried were found guilty in some or all of the charges of the indictments. It is not known if Captain Hahn assisted Taylor during these trials.

When World War II came to an end the Allies competed for access to top Nazis. SS General Walter Schellenberg was one of the most important (General Schellenberg was Adolf Hitler's last Chief of Foreign Intelligence). The British took Schellenberg into custody before the Americans or Russians could reach him. Captain Hahn was one of the few Americans allowed to interrogate General Schellenberg.

== Law career ==
Hahn returned to Los Angeles by 1947, where he was a founding member and director of the Los Angeles High School Alumni Association. Hahn was a founding member of two prominent Los Angeles law firms where he practiced business law for five decades. During 1951, at the age of 19, jockey Bill Shoemaker was making so much money (as much as $2,500 each week) that the Los Angeles Superior Court appointed Hahn as his guardian, with the consent of Shoemaker's parents. One of Hahn's law partners was Charles Older, who was appointed to the bench of the Los Angeles Superior Court in 1967 and presided over the Charles Manson murder trial. Hahn also served on various professional, corporate and civic boards. They included the Maytag Corporation of Newton, Iowa, the Chart House restaurant chain, and the Boy Scouts of America. At age 70, Hahn suffered an almost complete loss of vision while hiking in the Himalayas. He became active in the San Diego Center for the Blind, eventually serving as chairman of the board.
