= This Day and Age (film) =

1933 film by Cecil B. DeMille

- Directed by: Cecil B. DeMille
- Written by: Bartlett Cormack
- Produced by: Cecil B. DeMille (uncredited)
- Starring: Charles Bickford; Richard Cromwell
- Edited by: Anne Bauchens
- Distributed by: Paramount Pictures
- Release date: August 25, 1933
- Running time: 86 minutes
- Country: United States
- Language: English

This Day and Age is a 1933 American pre-Code film directed by Cecil B. DeMille and starring Charles Bickford and Richard Cromwell. It is one of his rarest films and has been released on home video through the Universal Pictures Vault Series DVD collection.

== Plot ==
During Boys' Week at racially integrated North High School, students Steve Smith, Gus Ruffo and Billy Anderson are elected to temporarily hold the city offices of district attorney, judge and chief of police. After Jewish tailor Herman refuses to pay protection money to Louis Garrett, Garrett's gang bombs his store. Herman and the student who was with him survive the blast, but Herman is later murdered by Garrett after he again refuses to pay. Garrett is acquitted of murder charges because he has a perfect alibi. Steve, who had taken the stand during the trial, is humiliated by his experience as a witness because he failed to prove Garrett's guilt. Billy, Gus and Sam Weber decide to investigate for themselves and discover part of a cufflink at the scene of the murder. They break into Garrett's bedroom, but Garrett is tipped off by Morry Dover, a student who is competing with Steve for the affection of Gay Merrick. While at Garrett's club with Gay, Dover introduces her to Toledo, Garrett's thug. Garrett shoots Billy, killing him, and frames Gus for the murder and robbery. After the funeral, Steve blames Gay for telling Dover about the plan to break into Garrett's apartment. He gathers all the student body presidents from neighboring high schools and formulates a plan to arrest Garrett. With the help of hundreds of students, Steve captures Garrett and takes him to a local brickyard for a secret trial. In the meantime, Gay and Dover, in an attempt to redeem themselves, capture Toledo's attentions, although Gay is forced to seduce him. Garrett confesses after the students suspend him over a pit filled with rats, and the mob marches him to city hall, with the assistance of the police, to get a witnessed confession. Meanwhile, the real "big" boss of Garrett's protection racket leaves town. After eluding Toledo, Gay arrives to witness Garrett's arrest. Garrett signs the confession; Gus is released; and Steve, Gay and Dover sit in a car she temporarily borrowed to get there, listening to a broadcast about themselves until a police officer arrests them for being in a stolen vehicle.

== Cast ==
- Charles Bickford – Louis Garrett
- Richard Cromwell – Steve Smith
- Judith Allen – Gay Merrick
- Harry Green – Herman
- Bradley Page – Toledo
- Edward J. Nugent – Don Merrick
- Ben Alexander – Morry Dover
- Lester Arnold – Sam Weber
- Michael Stuart – Billy Gordon
- Oscar Rudolph – Gus Ruffo
- Mickey Daniels – Mosher
- Fuzzy Knight – Max
- George Barbier – Judge Maguire
- Charles B. Middleton District Attorney
- Warner Richmond – Defense Attorney
- Samuel S. Hinds – Mayor
- Howard Lang – City Editor
- Onest Conley – George Harris
- Horace Hahn – Student Body President
- John Carradine – Assistant Principal Abernathy

== Production ==
Paramount Produced Properties lists Bartlett Cormack as the author of the original story, "Boys in Office", upon which the film is based.

However, in his autobiography Cecil B. DeMille credits Sam Mintz as the author of the story, from which Bartlett Cormack wrote a scenario. According to information in the MPAA/PCA files at the AMPAS library, the script for This Day and Age was submitted for approval by the AMPP on May 10, 1933. The AMPP responded with a letter to Paramount producer A. M. Botsford noting "three major problems": First, they questioned "the general treatment of established law and order, as represented by Judge Maguire. Censor boards lately (particularly New York State Board) have been insisting on maintaining respect for established law and order, and have stated specifically that they will not tolerate any attempt to undermine this sentiment. We suggest a certain toning down of some of the speeches. The second problem is the necessity of portraying this story in such a way that it will not be taken as a direct bid for open revolt and encouragement for high school pupils to disregard all the tenets of regularly constituted authorities, and attempt the administration of government by violent means....The third element is the use of the rat pit as a means of forcing confessions out of the gangster. This seems to us to be dangerous. It is bound to be offensive to a large part of any audience, particularly women, and unless great care is exercised, it May be so gruesome as to prove inadmissable both under the Code and to the censor boards generally."

In his book Cecil B. DeMille's Hollywood, author Robert S. Birchard relates how DeMille wasn't sure screenwriter Bartlett Cormack's script had a sense of current slang, so he asked Los Angeles High School student Horace Hahn to read the script and comment.

Studio personnel suggested other titles for the film, including High School Men, Battle Cry, High and Mighty, Pay Day, Live and Learn, May Day, We Want Action!, The Young March On!, The Snare, These Young Sinners, No Kidding, Over Here, We Accuse, Innocent Blood'', and Against the Rules. Ultimately the main title card was set with Bartlett Cormack's original choice: This Day and Age.

The AMPP also advised that "care" be taken in the scene when a bomb is thrown and when Garrett kicks Steve, recommended the deletion of the "action of the girl being patted on the posterior" and noted that "all use of the word 'lily'... should be deleted under the Code, as an inference of sex perversion." In the courtroom scenes, the AMPP recommended that "in the action of the boys walking up to the judge you take care not to inject any roughness that might be interpreted as disrespect to a representative of the law...This whole scene in the courtroom should be played in a dignified and serious manner, without any indication of contempt or disrespect...We recommend that Steve's speech, 'And you're going to try him without any bunk or hokum,' should be modified to something less rough, along the line of 'Try him according to the spirit as well as the letter of the law'...It would be advisable not to show the boys disregarding the judge's rapping for order. Also we believe further consideration should be given to the somewhat satiric tone of the opening lines of the district attorney's speech...."

In July 1933, the film was previewed by the AMPP, and in a letter to Paramount, they stated that "...after reviewing the picture, it seems to us that Mr. De Mille has handled these difficult elements with skill and discretion. At the preview we noted a few minor items which might cause censorship difficulty, and have written to the studio about them in detail...we do not believe it will be interpreted in any way as an attack on constituted authority or a portrayal of lynch law, inasmuch as the studio has taken care at all times to portray the boys as under control and working in harmony with the police department, having been appointed special deputies by the sheriff; and furthermore, at the conclusion of the picture the mayor, judge and the district attorney are portrayed as being won over to the boys' actions and in sympathy with them. We believe that on this basis, the story can be defended, should occasion arise." A letter to A. M. Botsford outlines some details "with which you May have censorship trouble in various territories."

In 1935, the film was re-released, but before issuing a certificate of approval, Joseph Breen, insisted on the removal of Toledo's line, "I like my olives green, but I never pick 'em myself."

The film was rejected in Holland because of "strong Fascist tendencies". The film was released in British Columbia with a caption in the beginning of the film and on the trailer that read, "This is a story of the supposed revolt of American youth against racketeering and the evasion of law. Dealing with a condition which must not be construed as affecting the Administration of law and order in this country."

Horace Hahn, student body president of a Los Angeles high school, and other Los Angeles high school students appeared in the film. Harry Green reportedly agreed to earn $1.00/week to appear in the film after a salary dispute. According to a Hollywood Reporter news item, the production was completed "$40,000 under budget and four days ahead of schedule." According to Motion Picture Herald, the film was released in conjunction with Boys Week.

A 1935 news item in Daily Variety reported that author James O'Hanlon sued Paramount, and Paramount writer Dave Lewis, for plagiarism, claiming that his story "Rough on Rats" was used for the film without his permission. The outcome of the lawsuit has not been determined.

According to more recent sources, Howard Jackson, L. Wolfe Gilbert and Abel Baer contributed to the music and John Carradine was in the cast. In his autobiography, DeMille said that he intended to expose the "evil of racketeering" in this picture, and although some critics thought the film was "fascist" in tone, due to the students' handling of the racketeer, it was not his intention that scenes such as the students' torture of the racketeer be taken as literal suggestions. DeMille noted the final day of shooting as June 21, 1933.

== Reception ==
The film was a box office failure for Paramount.
