= The Racket (1928 film) =

1928 film directed by Lewis Milestone

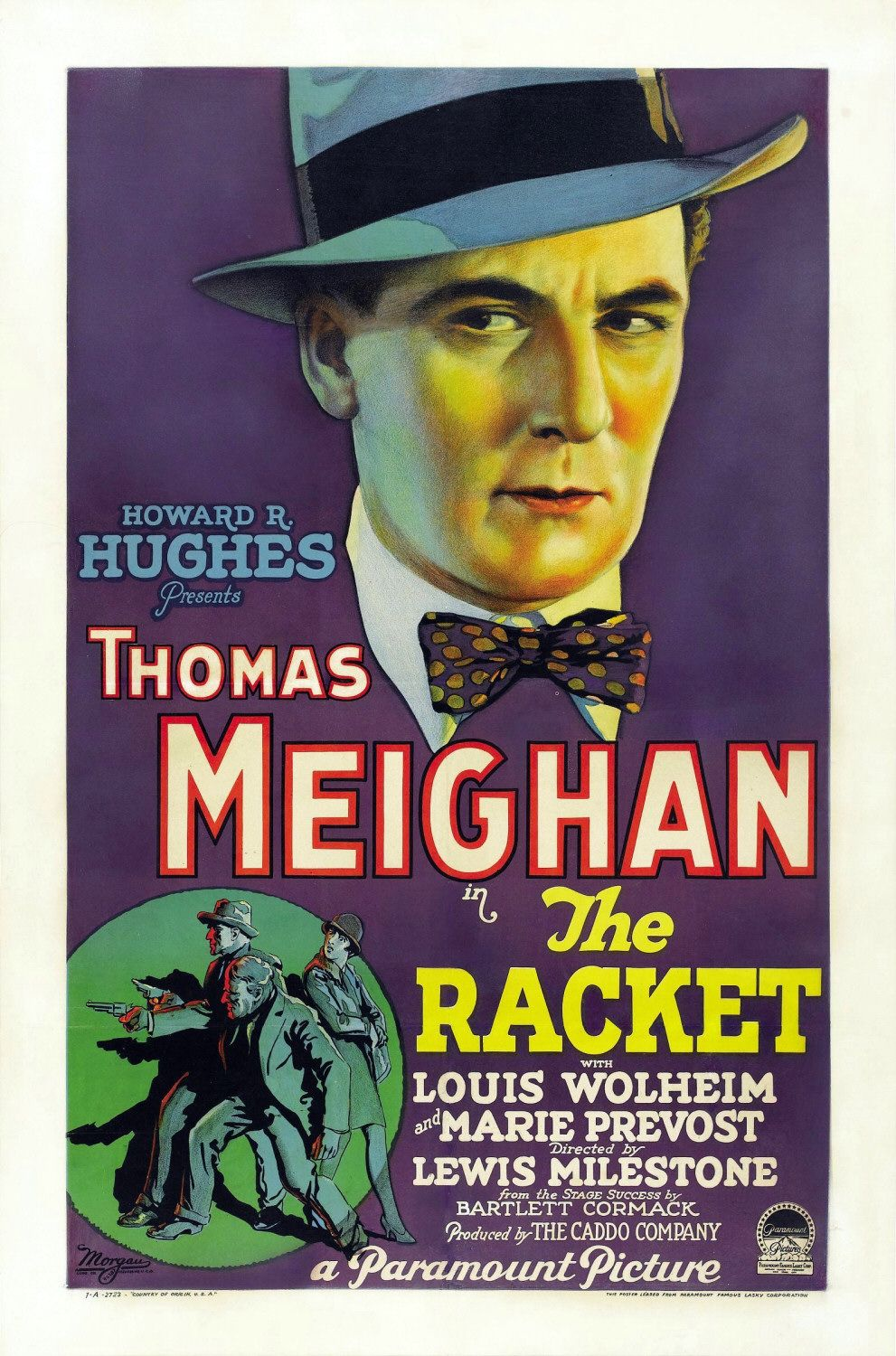
- Theatrical release poster
- Directed by: Lewis Milestone
- Written by: Bartlett Cormack; Tom Miranda; Uncredited: Harry Behn
- Based on: The Racket; 1927 play by Bartlett Cormack
- Produced by: Howard Hughes
- Starring: Thomas Meighan; Marie Prevost; Louis Wolheim
- Cinematography: Tony Gaudio
- Edited by: Eddie Adams
- Production company: The Caddo Company
- Distributed by: Paramount Pictures
- Release date: November 1, 1928
- Running time: 84 minutes
- Country: United States
- Language: Silent (English intertitles)

The Racket is a 1928 American silent crime noir film directed by Lewis Milestone and starring Thomas Meighan, Marie Prevost, Louis Wolheim, and George E. Stone. The film was produced by Howard Hughes, written by Bartlett Cormack and Tom Miranda, and was distributed by Paramount Pictures. It was adapted from Cormack's 1927 Broadway play The Racket.

== Plot ==
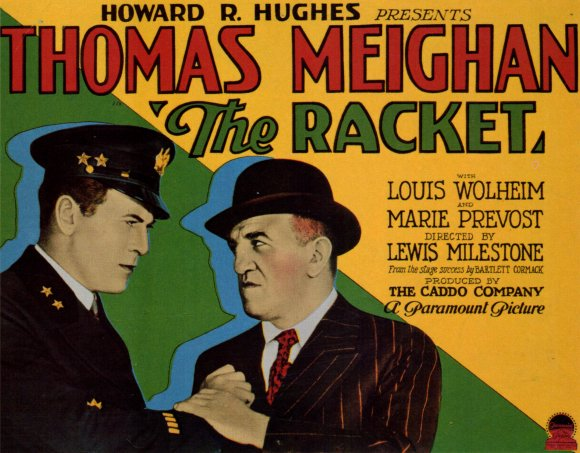
Lobby card

The Racket (full film)

Chicago Police Department officer James "Mac" McQuigg tries to keep the peace in Chicago during the Prohibition gang wars but is hampered by massive corruption. After a shootout between two gangs led by mob bosses Nick Scarsi and Spike Corcoran, McQuigg manages to arrest Scarsi's henchman Chick. Scarsi, upon hearing the news, contacts "The Old Man" in the Chicago Mayor's office, and Chick is released the same day with all charges dropped. Later that evening, a birthday party for Scarsi's younger brother Joe ends in an ambush in which Nick kills Spike. McQuigg arrests Nick Scarsi for murder but is forced to release him after being unable to find the murder weapon.

Although McQuigg vows to bring down Scarsi, the latter uses his connections to get him transferred to "the sticks" of the 28th precinct; Mac soon learns that Scarsi intends to do away with him after the upcoming mayoral election. After Joe is arrested and brought to his station for a hit-and-run accident, McQuigg convinces his girlfriend Helen Hayes to implicate him. Enraged at his attempts to free Joe being ignored, Nick Scarsi arrives and shoots the witness Patrolman Johnson, and McQuigg arrests him again for murder; Scarsi's attorney arrives with a writ of habeas corpus to free him, and McQuigg rips it up and imprisons him as well. Meanwhile, Hayes has fallen in love with cub reporter Dave Ames, who has witnessed both of Nick's murders and has agreed to identify him at trial. Using Ames to rile Scarsi up, Hayes tricks him into confessing to shooting Johnson in front of District Attorney Welch. With evidence mounting against Scarsi, "The Old Man" and Welch's political machine turns on him in order to remain in power at the upcoming municipal election. They trick him into attempting to escape and trying to shoot McQuigg with an empty gun before killing him themselves.

== Cast ==
- Thomas Meighan as Captain James McQuigg
- Louis Wolheim as Nick Scarsi
- Lucien Prival as Chick
- Marie Prevost as Helen Hayes
- G. Pat Collins as Patrolman Johnson (credited as Pat Collins)
- Henry Sedley as Spike Corcoran
- George E. Stone as Joe Scarsi (credited as George Stone)
- Sam De Grasse as District Attorney Welch (credited as Sam DeGrasse)
- Richard "Skeets" Gallagher as Miller (credited as Skeets Gallagher)
- Lee Moran as Pratt
- John Darrow as Dave Ames – Cub Reporter

== Background ==
Due to the controversial portrayal of a corrupt police force and city government, both the film and the play were banned at the time in Chicago. The main antagonist Nick Scarsi was modeled after Al Capone while "The Old Man" was modeled after Chicago Mayor William Hale "Big Bill" Thompson.

== Reception ==
The Racket is one of the films nominated for the Academy Award for Best Picture (then called Outstanding Picture) in the 1929 Academy Awards.

On review aggregator website Rotten Tomatoes, the film has an approval rating of 100 percent based on 6 critics, with an average rating of 7.50 out of 10.

Variety wrote "A good story, plus good direction, plus a great cast and minus dumb supervision, is responsible for another great underworld film".

== Preservation and home video ==
Only one copy of the film was known to exist. It was long thought lost before being located in Howard Hughes' film collection after his death. The Racket was preserved by the Academy Film Archive in 2016. It airs occasionally on Turner Classic Movies.

A restored version of the film will be released on Blu-ray alongside Hughes' Two Arabian Knights by Flicker Alley in July 2026.

== Remake ==
The Howard Hughes-owned RKO studios remade The Racket in 1951 with Robert Mitchum and Robert Ryan in the lead roles.

== See also ==
- List of rediscovered films
- The Big City (1928)
- Dressed to Kill (1928)
