= Pepper (film) =

1936 American comedy film

- Theatrical release poster
- Directed by: James Tinling
- Screenplay by: Jefferson Parker; Murray Roth; Lamar Trotti
- Produced by: John Stone
- Starring: Jane Withers; Irvin S. Cobb; Slim Summerville
- Cinematography: Daniel B. Clark
- Edited by: Fred Allen
- Production company: 20th Century Fox
- Distributed by: 20th Century Fox
- Release date: August 8, 1936
- Running time: 95 minutes
- Country: United States
- Language: English
- Box office: $500,000

Pepper is a 1936 American comedy film directed by James Tinling and written by Jefferson Parker, Murray Roth and Lamar Trotti. The film stars Jane Withers, Irvin S. Cobb, Slim Summerville, Dean Jagger, Muriel Robert and Ivan Lebedeff. The film was released on August 8, 1936, by 20th Century Fox.

== Plot ==
Wealthy John Wilkes (Irvin S. Cobb) is perfectly happy to live a grumpy and unfulfilled existence with only his money for company. Little girl Pepper Jolly (Jane Withers) worms her way into his life to turn his life upside down with frightening carnival rides and other adventures, while conspiring to keep Wilkes' daughter from making the mistake of her life.

== Cast ==
- Jane Withers as Pepper Jolly
- Irvin S. Cobb as John Wilkes
- Slim Summerville as Uncle Ben Jolly
- Dean Jagger as Bob O'Ryan
- Muriel Robert as Helen Wilkes
- Ivan Lebedeff as Baron Von Stofel
- George Humbert as Socrates
- Maurice Cass as Doctor
- Romaine Callender as Butler
- Tommy Bupp as Jimmy
- Carey Harrison as Footman
- Reginald Simpson as Chauffeur
