= If You Could Only Cook =

1935 film by William A. Seiter

- Publicity photograph: Jean Arthur's lipstick traces on Herbert Marshall (left) and Leo Carrillo
- Directed by: William A. Seiter
- Written by: F. Hugh Herbert (story); Howard J. Green; Gertrude Purcell
- Produced by: Everett Riskin
- Starring: Herbert Marshall; Jean Arthur; Leo Carrillo
- Cinematography: John Stumar
- Edited by: Gene Havlick
- Distributed by: Columbia Pictures
- Release date: December 30, 1935
- Running time: 70-72 minutes
- Country: USA
- Language: English

If You Could Only Cook (1935) is a screwball comedy of mistaken identity starring Herbert Marshall as a frustrated automobile executive and Jean Arthur as a young woman who talks him into posing as her husband so they can land jobs as a butler and a cook.

== Plot ==
Jim Buchanan, the wealthy president of Buchanan Motor Company, is engaged to Evelyn Fletcher, a bossy socialite who is interested in Jim for his money. When Jim's fellow executives reject his plan to introduce a new automobile design, he decides to take a vacation.

Declaring himself "sick and tired of everything", Jim goes for a walk in the park, where he meets a young woman named Joan Hawthorne. Joan is having trouble finding a job and has just been evicted from her apartment. Assuming he is also a job hunter, she asks Jim to pose as her husband so they can apply for a combined job opening for a butler and a cook. He agrees.

"Mr. and Mrs. Burns" are soon hired by Michael Rossini. She is a good cook, but he improves his skills by sneaking away at night and taking lessons from his butler, Jennings. He also goes to his office and takes some of his automobile sketches from a safe to show to Joan. Rossini, who has just organized a bootlegging gang, learns of Jim's trip to the office from his henchman, Flash, who is suspicious of Jim and has been tailing him. Impressed by his designs, on their day off she shows them to an executive with one of Buchanan's competitors, but he recognizes Buchanan's style, leading to her arrest for theft. Having fallen in love with Jim, she refuses to help the police find him.

Meanwhile, Jim has decided to tell Joan who he is. When she misses their lunch date (because she is in jail), he writes her a letter, abandons his butler position, and returns to his life as a businessman. Wanting Joan for himself, Rossini has her bailed out. When Flash sees Jim's picture in a newspaper article about his impending wedding, he informs Rossini, who tells Joan the truth about Jim.

Rossini promptly orders his henchmen to kill Jim at his wedding. To ingratiate himself with Joan, he tells her about this, but she declares that she loves Jim after all and begs Rossini to spare his life.

Rossini's men abduct Jim from the wedding as he is about to take his vows, but Rossini arrives before they leave. He and his men take Jim home at gunpoint and fetch a justice of the peace to marry Jim and Joan. Joan refuses and locks herself in her room, but Jim embraces the plan. Since Rossini's men were seen kidnapping him, he blackmails the gang into persuading her to change her mind. Outside Joan's room, Rossini pretends to argue with Jim, Flash fires his gun in the air, and Jim collapses onto the floor, pretending to be hit. The deception works: Joan opens the door and rushes to his side.

== Cast ==
- Herbert Marshall as Jim Buchanan/Burns
- Jean Arthur as Joan Hawthorne/Burns
- Leo Carrillo as Mike Rossini
- Lionel Stander as Flash, Rossini's right-hand man
- Alan Edwards as Bob Reynolds
- Frieda Inescort as Evelyn Fletcher
- Romaine Callender as Jennings
- Gene Morgan as Al
- Ralf Harolde as Swig
- Matt McHugh as Pete
- Bess Flowers as Laura
- Richard Powell as Chesty

== Lawsuit ==
In England, Columbia promoted the film as a Frank Capra production. Capra, the top director at the studio—who had been feuding with studio head Harry Cohn over financial and artistic issues—sued Columbia for unlawful use of his name. The parties settled, with Capra returning to the studio while getting $100,000 (the number based on a separate dispute over salary) and having one film waived from a contractual five-film obligation.

== Reception ==
The New York Times review was mixed, stating, "the texture of the production is too uneven. It has laughs but lacks pace." The critic praised the performances of Marshall, Carrillo and Stander, but felt that "... Jean Arthur, a genuinely versatile player, could not quite lend the sparkle to the role of the girl which it conceivably deserved."

Writing for The Spectator in 1936, Graham Greene gave the film a negative review. Acknowledging that there were a few scenes and situations which bore "a few agreeable Capra touches", Greene complained that the film would have had "more wit if the main performance [by Marshall] had been less earnest, less conceited, [and] less humourless..."
