= The Racket (1951 film) =

1951 film by John Cromwell

- Theatrical release poster referencing the Kefauver Committee
- Directed by: John Cromwell; Uncredited: Nicholas Ray; Tay Garnett; Sherman Todd; Mel Ferrer
- Screenplay by: William Wister Haines; W.R. Burnett
- Based on: The Racket; 1927 play by Bartlett Cormack
- Produced by: Edmund Grainger
- Starring: Robert Mitchum; Lizabeth Scott; Robert Ryan
- Cinematography: George E. Diskant
- Edited by: Sherman Todd
- Music by: Paul Sawtell
- Production company: RKO Pictures
- Distributed by: RKO Pictures
- Release dates: October 25, 1951 (Philadelphia); November 9, 1951 (Los Angeles); December 12, 1951 (New York)
- Running time: 89 minutes
- Country: United States
- Language: English
- Box office: $1.75 million (U.S. rentals)

The Racket is a 1951 black-and-white drama film noir directed by John Cromwell and uncredited directors Nicholas Ray, Tay Garnett and Mel Ferrer. The film stars Robert Mitchum, Lizabeth Scott, Robert Ryan and William Conrad. Future Perry Mason regular cast members William Talman and Ray Collins appear in key roles.

The film is a remake of the 1928 film The Racket and is indirectly based on a play by Bartlett Cormack.

== Plot ==
Racketeer and mobster Nick Scanlon has managed to buy several of the local government and law-enforcement officials of a large midwestern American city. However, he cannot touch the incorruptible police captain Tom McQuigg, who refuses all attempts at bribery. The city's prosecuting attorney Welsh and state police detective Turk are crooked and make McQuigg's job as an honest officer nearly impossible. Higgins, a corrupt deputy prosecutor, is killed in a mob hit.

McQuigg, who wants to stop all mob corruption in the city, persuades sexy nightclub singer Irene Hayes to testify against Scanlon, which marks her for death. A bomb explodes near McQuigg's home, frightening his wife Mary.

Honest cop Bob Johnson is helpful to McQuigg, as is reporter Dave Ames, who has a romantic interest in Irene. At the police precinct one night, Scanlon enters alone demanding to see Irene, who is being held in protective custody, and kills Johnson in a fight. After a car chase, Scanlon is arrested. McQuigg ignores Scanlon's lawyer, tearing apart his writ of habeas corpus. McQuigg has the gun that killed Johnson, which has Scanlon's fingerprints on it.

Welsh and Turk phone Scanlon's mob boss for instructions. They tell Scanlon that he must remain in lockup until after the next election, angering him, and he threatens to tell all. Scanlon seizes the murder weapon, but it has been emptied of its bullets by McQuigg, who had foreseen everything that Scanlon would try. Turk shoots Scanlon dead and is detained with Welsh by investigators bearing subpoenas.

Irene leaves with Dave, indicating her interest in him. McQuigg goes home with his wife after a long day, aware that tomorrow will probably be just as busy.

== Cast ==
- Robert Mitchum as Captain Thomas McQuigg
- Lizabeth Scott as Irene Hayes
- Robert Ryan as Nick Scanlon
- William Talman as Officer Bob Johnson
- Ray Collins as District Attorney Mortimer X. Welsh
- Joyce MacKenzie as Mary McQuigg
- Robert Hutton as Dave Ames
- Virginia Huston as Lucy Johnson
- William Conrad as Detective Sergeant Turk
- Walter Sande as Precinct Sgt. Jim Delaney
- Les Tremayne as Harry Craig
- Don Porter as R.G. Connolly
- Walter Baldwin as Booking Sgt. Sullivan
- Brett King as Joe Scanlon
- Richard Karlan as Breeze Enright
- Tito Vuolo as Tony, Nick's Barber
- Milburn Stone as member of Craig's team (uncredited)

== Release ==
The film's world premiere was held at the Earle Theatre in Philadelphia on October 25, 1951.

== Reception ==
In a contemporary review for The New York Times, critic Bosley Crowther wrote: "[T]he conflict of cop and crook is conspicuously unoriginal, considering the number of times that it has been contemplated on the screen since 'The Racket' was first produced, and the staging of it, under the direction of John Cromwell, is dismally uninspired. Furthermore, the construction of the screen play by W. R. Burnett and William Wister Haines is so badly disordered toward the finish that it is almost impossible to perceive the intricacies of the planning by which the cop lures the crook to his doom. As a consequence, the collision of Mr. Mitchum and Mr. Ryan is a pretty dull one, in this instance marked mainly by exchanges of clichés, and the rest of the cast does little to add life to the activities."

Critic Philip K. Scheuer of the Los Angeles Times wrote: "Bartlett Cormack's 'The Racket,' a stage and screen hit of a quarter-century ago, has had so many imitations since then that its remake by Howard Hughes seems like an imitation of THEM. As a gangster piece it still has its automatic excitement; but as an 'expose' of the underworld's tie-in with city and state government it is— despite the Kefauver committee's recent investigations—as old-fashioned as a night-stick-swinging, pavement-pounding cop."

In The Philadelphia Inquirer, reviewer Mildred Martin called the film "a classic, in its way" and "complicated, bare-knuckled and unvarnished in its violence".
