= St. Martin's Lane (film) =

Sidewalks of London
- Poster (Mexico)
- Directed by: Tim Whelan
- Written by: Bartlett Cormack; Clemence Dane; Charles Laughton; Erich Pommer; Tim Whelan
- Produced by: Erich Pommer; Charles Laughton (uncredited)
- Starring: Charles Laughton; Vivien Leigh; Rex Harrison
- Cinematography: Jules Kruger
- Edited by: Robert Hamer; Hugh Stewart
- Music by: Arthur Johnston; Jack Beaver
- Production company: Mayflower Pictures
- Distributed by: Paramount Pictures (US)
- Release dates: 19 October 1938 (UK); 15 February 1940 (US)
- Running time: 85 minutes
- Country: United Kingdom
- Language: English
- Budget: £171,561

St Martin's Lane, also known as Sidewalks of London, London After Dark, and Partners of the Night, is a 1938 British black-and-white comedy drama starring Charles Laughton as a busker who teams up with a talented pickpocket, played by Vivien Leigh. The film co-stars Rex Harrison and Tyrone Guthrie in a rare acting appearance. It also features Ronald Shiner as the barman (uncredited). It was produced by Laughton's Mayflower Pictures Corporation.

== Plot ==
Charles Staggers is a London street performer, or busker, with his partners, Arthur Smith and Gentry.

He protects Liberty, known as Libby, a runaway and pickpocket, when she steals a gold cigarette case from successful song writer Harley Prentiss. He takes her into their troupe, making their trio into a quartet.

Libby attracts the attention of Prentiss and his wealthy friends, who can give her a life and career away from the streets. When she leaves, cruelly rejecting Charles's marriage proposal, he doesn't want to go on with the act anymore, and becomes an alcoholic. Libby's career, however, is a big success; she is offered a Hollywood contract. She asks Prentiss to marry her but he declines, saying he doesn't want to be thrown away, like Charles, as a mere stepping stone for her career.

In the press of crowds waiting to see her as a big star, Charles tries to catch Libby's attention but is arrested for causing a disturbance and spends time in prison. After his release he earns a living by pretending to be a blind match seller. On her way to rehearsals, Libby bumps into him and pushes him into her taxi. At the theatre, she persuades him to audition, but it goes badly and he walks out. Libby chases after him, begging him to return. He shakes his head. They hug and say goodbye. As he walks off, Charles sees his former busking friends performing; he joins them and they start doing their old act together.

== Cast ==
- Charles Laughton as Charles Staggers
- Vivien Leigh as Liberty (Libby)
- Rex Harrison as Harley Prentiss
- Larry Adler as Constantine
- Tyrone Guthrie as Gentry
- Gus McNaughton as Arthur Smith
- Edward Lexy as Mr. Such
- Maire O'Neill as Mrs. Such
- Helen Haye as Selina
- Cyril Smith as Black Face
- Ronald Shiner as the Barman (uncredited)

== Production ==
According to Vivien Leigh's biographer Alexander Walker, Laughton and Vivien Leigh did not get along while working together. Walker wrote that when an attempt was made to obtain Leigh's services for a film version of Cyrano de Bergerac, Laughton stated that she would have to dye her hair blonde. Leigh asked for a blonde wig, but Laughton insisted she dye her hair. The discussions fell through and Leigh felt slighted. A decade later she did dye her hair blonde playing Blanche DuBois in Tennessee Williams' play A Streetcar Named Desire, both on the stage in 1949 and in the 1951 film version.

When Leigh was approached to make Sidewalks of London, she did not want to work with Laughton and she felt no attachment to the role. Nevertheless, she was persuaded otherwise. In Alexander Walker's biography of Leigh, Larry Adler is quoted as saying that Leigh was difficult to work with. He said, "She didn't like Charles and he didn't like her. But he was much more professional. One weekend there were a few close-ups of Vivien to be done outside a theatre and Charles, who invariably went down to the country with Elsa [Lanchester] at weekends, stayed up in town to 'feed' Vivien lines from behind the camera. I doubt if she'd have done as much for him. [Laurence] Olivier would show up on the set and they'd disappear into her dressing-room and it was quite a business to get her back to work." Olivier would show up on the days that Leigh was to shoot love scenes with the handsome Rex Harrison.

Editor Hugh Stewart called it "a dreadful film".

== Adaptations ==
The film was adapted into the stage musical Busker Alley with songs by the Sherman Brothers. After several false starts with Tommy Tune as director and starring Tune and Melissa Errico, the musical was performed at the York Theatre in New York on 13 December 2006 starring Jim Dale and Glenn Close. A CD which recreated this one-night-only performance was released by Jay Records in 2007.
