= Bartlett Cormack =

American actor

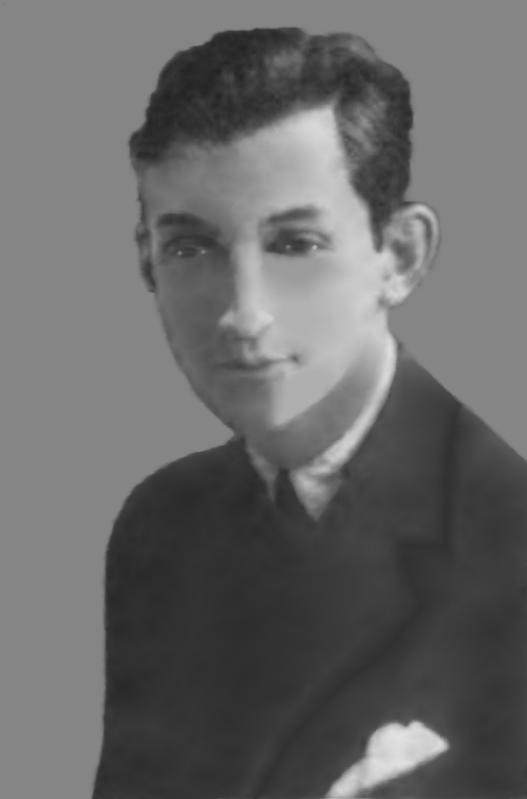
- Photo from The University of Chicago Magazine, November, 1921, the year he wrote the script for Anybody's Girl.
- Born: Edward Bartlett Cormack; March 19, 1898; Hammond, Indiana, United States
- Died: September 16, 1942 (aged 44); Phoenix, Arizona, United States

Edward Bartlett Cormack (March 19, 1898 – September 16, 1942) was an American actor, playwright, screenwriter, and producer best known for his 1927 Broadway play The Racket, and for working with Howard Hughes and Cecil B. DeMille on several films.

== Early life ==
Cormack was the son of Scottish-born Edward K. Cormack and Alice E. Cormack. By 1900 his family had moved from Hammond, Indiana to Chicago, Illinois where his father worked in sales. He graduated from University High School, and was accepted at the University of Chicago. While a sophomore, Cormack wrote the play Anybody's Girl, considered to be one of the best ever submitted for the Blackfriars (the student dramatic organization). Cormack became a member of Maurice Browne's Little Theatre Company in Chicago, but his duties as a general handyman were so demanding he was dismissed from the university as a result of poor class attendance.

To gain experience as a writer, he got a job at the Chicago Evening Journal and stayed there a year, covering "hangings, race riots, street car strikes and other diversions characteristic of Mayor Thompson's turbulent town". He left the Chicago Evening Journal for the Chicago American, working there five years before applying for reinstatement at the University of Chicago. He wrote two more college plays and became engaged, graduating two years later with honors and as a Phi Beta Kappa. He returned to The American, where he wrote features and dramatic criticism.

In 1923, he married Adelaide Maurine Bledsoe (1901–1999), the daughter of Samuel T. Bledsoe, who was a president and board chairman of the Atchison, Topeka, and Santa Fe Railroad. They had a son, Thomas Bledsoe Cormack, and a daughter, Adelaide Kilbee Cormack. Soon after the wedding, he accepted a position as a press agent for a theater production and the couple moved to New York City.

== Stage career ==
As a playwright, Cormack's most influential work was his 1927 Broadway play The Racket, which featured Edward G. Robinson in his first gangster role. The Racket was an exposé of political corruption in the 1920s, and was considered one of the models for the Hollywood gangster cycle of the late 1920s and early 1930s. The events take place over a period of about 18 hours in a police station on the outskirts of Chicago, and features wisecracking crime reporters who dash to the telephone and holler, "Get me the desk!" Writing in The Miami News on December 24, 1927, O. O. McIntyre said Bartlett Cormack was "the only playwright who has made the reporter real on the stage." The play was considered so inflammatory that it was denied a presentation in Chicago, allegedly at the orders of Al Capone; the ban remained in effect for nearly two decades.

Cormack shared writing credit for the play Tampico with Joseph Hergesheimer, who wrote the novel of the same name in 1926. The play was produced on Broadway in 1928 with Ilka Chase and Gavin Gordon in the cast. MGM acquired the screen rights to the play in 1930.

Cormack later wrote Hey Diddle Diddle, a comedy whose setting was a duplex apartment in Hollywood. The play premiered in Princeton, New Jersey on January 21, 1937, with Lucille Ball as Julie Tucker, "one of three roommates coping with neurotic directors, confused executives, and grasping stars who interfere with the girls' ability to get ahead." The play received good reviews, but there were problems, chiefly with its star, Conway Tearle, who was in poor health. Cormack wanted to replace him, but the producer, Anne Nichols, said the fault lay with the character and insisted that the part needed to be reshaped and rewritten. The two were unable to agree on a solution. The play was scheduled to open on Broadway at the Vanderbilt Theatre, but closed after one week in Washington, D.C. when Tearle suddenly became gravely ill.

== Film career ==
Moving to Beverly Hills in 1928, he worked with Howard Hughes on the silent film version of The Racket, one of the first films nominated for the Academy Award for Best Picture (then called "Best Picture, Production") in 1929.

He shared screenwriting credit with Rex Beach for the 1930 film version of The Spoilers. Beach based his 1906 novel on the true story of corrupt government officials stealing gold mines from prospectors, which Beach had witnessed while he was prospecting in Nome, Alaska. The novel was adapted to the screen on five occasions; 1914, 1923, 1930, 1942, and 1955.

Although Ben Hecht was the author of the Broadway play The Front Page, and was himself a screenwriter, Howard Hughes chose Cormack and Charles Lederer to write the script for the 1931 film The Front Page. At the 4th Academy Awards, the film was nominated for Best Picture, Best Director, and Best Actor.

In 1933, he wrote the script for Cecil B. DeMille's This Day and Age, a film in which a group of High School students take the law into their own hands. In his book Cecil B. DeMille's Hollywood, author Robert S. Birchard relates how DeMille wasn't sure Cormack's script had a sense of current slang, so he asked high school student Horace Hahn to read the script and comment (at the time, Hahn was senior class president at Los Angeles High School). Today the "Gee, that's swell" dialogue of early 1930s films might be considered one to laugh at, but this (according to Hahn at least) was the way he and his fellow students talked. He wrote DeMille that the majority of the dialogue in Cormack's script was "really not typical of high school students. [It] Should be interspersed with a few exclamations like, 'heck' — 'gosh' — 'gee,' etc" Hahn also suggested that in Steve's speech about the murdered tailor the writer add: "Gosh, he was swell to us fellows." Despite seeking Hahn's advice, however, DeMille and Cormack did not take up his suggestions.

In 1935, he collaborated with screenwriter Fritz Lang and story author Norman Krasna on the anti-lynching film Fury, for which Krasna received an Academy Award nomination for Best Writing, Original Story.

Briefly relocating to England in 1938, Cormack helped write the screenplays for Sidewalks of London, and the Charles Laughton film Vessel of Wrath (released in the United States as The Beachcomber). Cormack did some work on the script for the 1941 DeMille film Northwest Mounted Police, but did not receive credit. One of Cormack's final screenwriting assignments was 1941's Unholy Partners, which starred Edward G. Robinson. Robinson acted in the original Broadway staging of The Racket, playing the part of an unidentified man.

The 1951 remake of The Racket was directed by John Cromwell. Cromwell was the star in the original Broadway staging of The Racket.

== Works ==
=== Stage plays ===
- 1922 Anybody's Girl
- 1927 The Racket
- 1928 Tampico
- 1930 The Painted Veil
- 1936 Hey Diddle Diddle

=== Screenplays ===
- 1928 The Racket
- 1929 Woman Trap
- 1929 The Greene Murder Case
- 1929 Gentlemen of the Press
- 1929 The Laughing Lady
- 1930 The Spoilers
- 1930 The Benson Murder Case
- 1931 The Front Page
- 1931 Kick In
- 1932 Thirteen Women
- 1932 The Phantom of Crestwood
- 1932 Is My Face Red?
- 1933 This Day and Age
- 1934 The Trumpet Blows
- 1934 Four Frightened People
- 1934 Cleopatra
- 1935 Orchids to You
- 1936 Fury
- 1935 Doubting Thomas
- 1936 King of Burlesque (uncredited)
- 1938 Sidewalks of London
- 1938 Vessel of Wrath
- 1941 Unholy Partners
- 1951 The Racket (1951, from 1928 screenplay)

=== Film actor ===
- 1938 Sidewalks of London as Strang

=== Film producer ===
- 1933 The Past of Mary Holmes
