= The Reverse of the Medal (disambiguation) =

The Reverse of the Medal may refer to:

- The Reverse of the Medal, a historical novel, eleventh in the Aubrey-Maturin series by Patrick O'Brien
- The Reverse of the Medal, a 1923 silent war film
- Teleny, or The Reverse of the Medal, a Victorian pornographic novel sometimes attributed to Oscar Wilde
