= Evelyn Peirce =

American actress

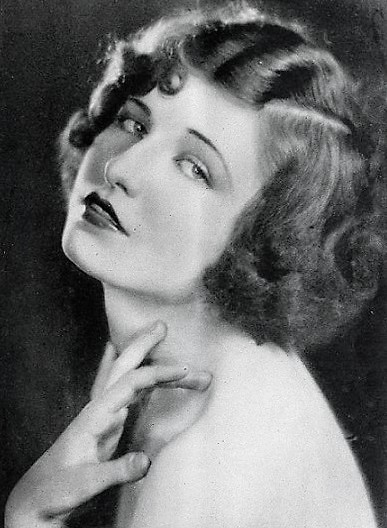
- Born: February 5, 1907; Del Rio, Texas, U.S.
- Died: August 9, 1960 (aged 53); Oyster Bay, New York, U.S.
- Resting place: Locust Valley Cemetery
- Spouse: Robert (Tex) Allen (m. 1934)
- Children: 2, including Ted Baehr

Evelyn Peirce (February 5, 1907 – August 9, 1960) was an American film actress during the silent film era, and into the 1930s.

== Biography ==
Peirce was born in Del Rio, Texas, and moved to Hollywood as a professional stage dancer, and was spotted by talent scouts and encouraged to pursue an acting career in the mid-1920s. Her first role was in the 1925 film Excuse Me, which was uncredited. Her first credited role was that same year in Don't, which starred Sally O'Neil. She was also one of thirteen girls selected as "WAMPAS Baby Stars" in 1925, which included actress June Marlowe. Following being selected by "WAMPAS" she received a minor contract with Metro-Goldwyn-Mayer (MGM) which lasted through 1931.

From 1927 through 1931, Peirce appeared in seven films, two of which were uncredited. She continued to act through 1935 after the end of her MGM contract, but only had one credited role out of six films during that period.

She married actor Robert (Tex) Allen, and although he continued to act well into the 1980s, Peirce retired from acting. They had one daughter, Katherine Meyer, and a son, Ted Baehr, who chose to go by his father's birth name, and who is a well known media critic, as well as chairman of The Christian Film and Television Commission, and publisher of MOVIEGUIDE. Allen and Peirce settled in Oyster Bay, New York, where they were residing at the time of her death at age 52 in 1960.

== Sources ==
- Anderson, Chuck (October 3, 2008) "Columbia In Transition: Bob Allen and Jack Luden." The Old Corral (b-westerns.com), accessed October 25, 2008
- Evelyn Pierce [sic], WAMPAS Baby Star, 1925
