= The Woman Hater (1925 film) =

1925 film

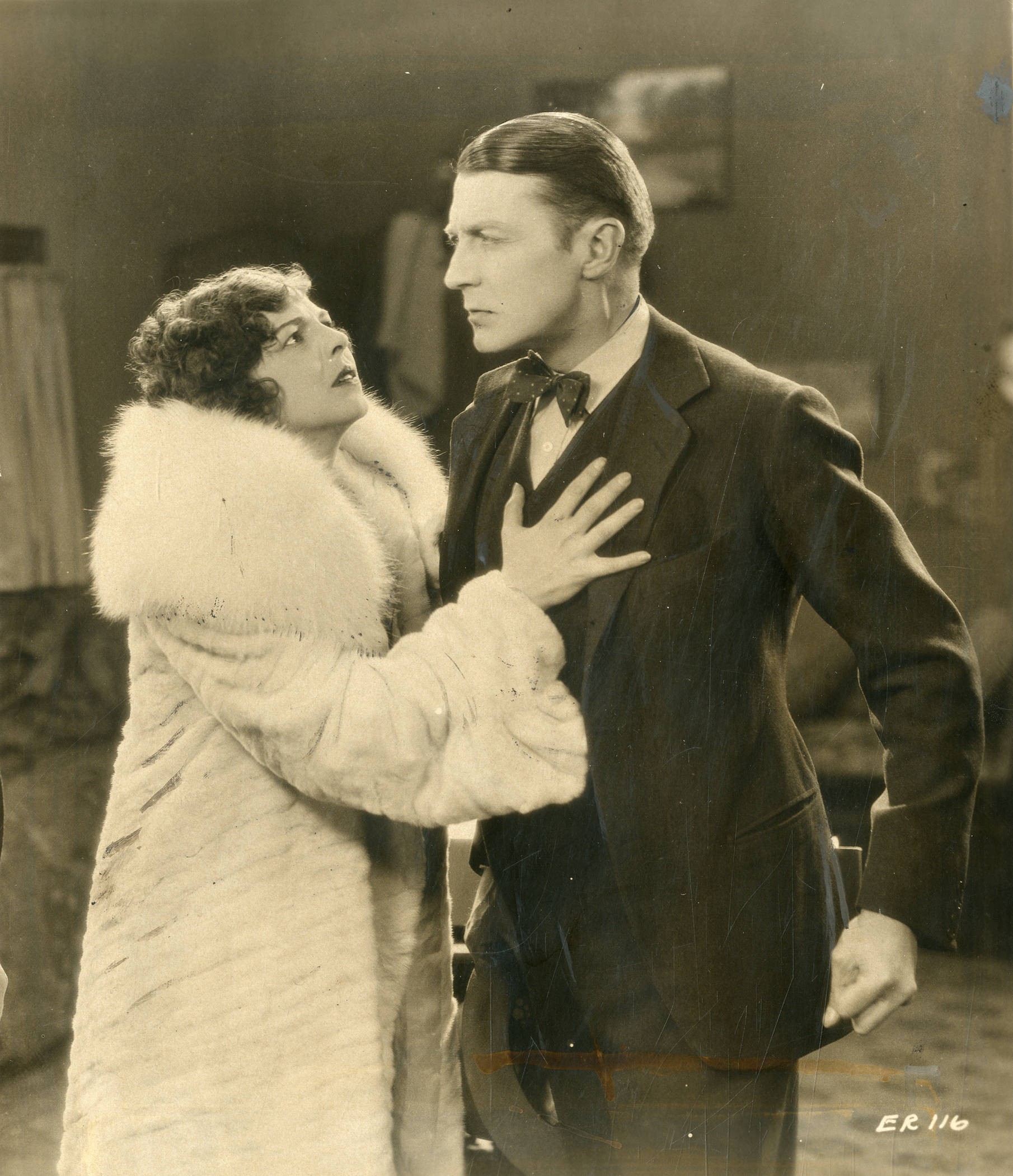
- Film still
- Directed by: James Flood
- Written by: Ruby M. Ayres; Louis D. Lighton; Hope Loring
- Based on: The Eleventh Virgin by Dorothy Day
- Starring: Helene Chadwick; Clive Brook; John Harron
- Cinematography: John J. Mescall
- Production company: Warner Bros.
- Distributed by: Warner Bros.
- Release date: July 12, 1925
- Running time: 70 minutes
- Country: United States
- Language: Silent (English intertitles)

The Woman Hater is a 1925 American silent drama film directed by James Flood and starring Helene Chadwick, Clive Brook, and John Harron. It was produced and distributed by Warner Bros.

== Plot ==
As described in a film magazine review, Miles, lover of Marie Lamont, leaves her because he believes her to be untrue. She rises to fame as an actress and infatuates the youthful Philip Tranter. Philip's mother begs Miles to save Philip from the woman. Miles succeeds in having Marie break several engagements with Philip. Philip, unable to restrain himself, breaks into Marie's apartment and finds her in the arms of Miles. He threatens them both with a gun. Marie declares that she was only playing with Miles, and thus saves him. Philip, certain that she does not love him, also leaves. Marie dashes across New York in her car, stops Miles as he is boarding a ship, and they declare their mutual love.

== Cast ==
- Helene Chadwick as Marie Lamont, the Actress
- Clive Brook as Miles, the Woman-hater
- John Harron as Philip Tranter, the Millionaire
- Helen Dunbar as Mrs. Tranter
- Dale Fuller as Secretary

== Preservation ==
A print of The Woman Hater is housed at the French archive Centre national du cinéma et de l'image animée in Fort de Bois-d'Arcy.

== Bibliography ==
- Monaco, James. The Encyclopedia of Film. Perigee Books, 1991.
