= Helene Chadwick =

American actress (1897–1940)

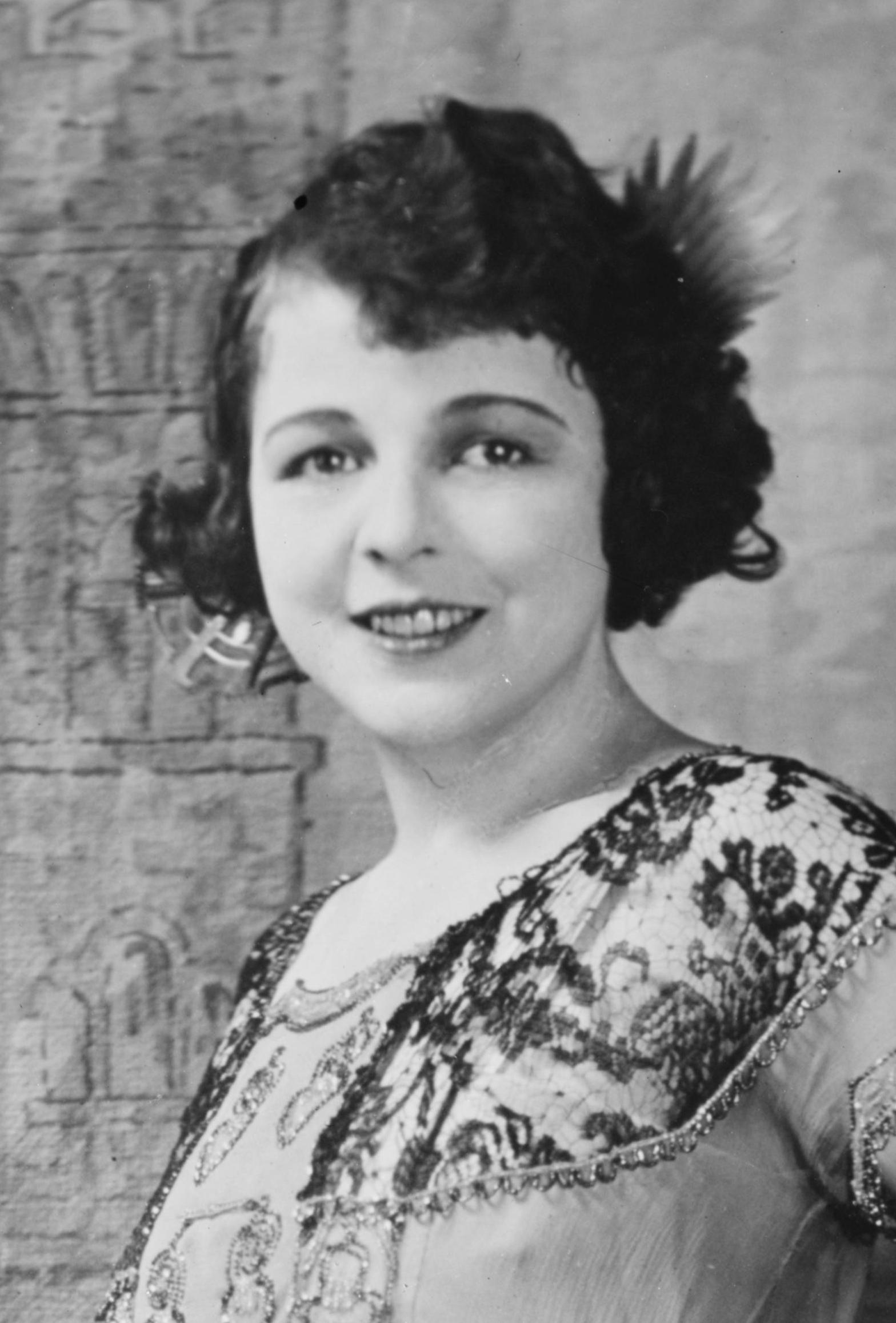
- Chadwick in 1921
- Born: November 25, 1897; Chadwicks, New York, NY, U.S.
- Died: September 4, 1940 (aged 42); Los Angeles, California, U.S.
- Other name: Helen Chadwick
- Occupation: Actress
- Years active: 1916–1937
- Spouse(s): Louis Fontaine (1915-?, divorced); William A. Wellman (July 2, 1921–September 5, 1923)

Helene Chadwick (November 25, 1897 – September 4, 1940) was an American actress in silent and in early sound films.

== Early life and career ==
Chadwick was born in the small town of Chadwicks, New York, which was named for her great-grandfather. Her parents were George W. Chadwick Jr. and Marie Louise Norton Chadwick. Her mother was a singer who performed on the stage and her father was a business man.

She began making films for Pathé Pictures in Manhattan, New York. Her first film was The Challenge (1916), which was produced by Astra Film Corporation and released by Pathé. A director was impressed by Chadwicks's talent as an equestrian, thus she began acting as a western star but this did not continue with the exodus of film production from the east to the west coast. Signed by Samuel Goldwyn, Chadwick went to California in 1913 and entered silent movies in 1916. At the pinnacle of her acting career, she earned a salary estimated to have been $2,000 per week. From 1929 until 1935, she found success as a character actress when sound was being introduced to films.

In the final five years of her life, she was reduced to taking roles as an extra, playing "atmospheric parts". Helene made movies with Warner Brothers, Columbia Pictures, 20th Century Fox, Metro-Goldwyn-Mayer, Paramount Pictures, and other studios. Her final film was Mary Burns, Fugitive (1935).

Her most noteworthy performances came in Heartsease (1919), The Long Arm of the Manister (1919), The Cup of Fury (1920), Godless Men (1920), Dangerous Curve Ahead (1921), From The Ground Up (1921), Yellow Men and Gold (1922), Dust Flower (1922), The Sin Flood (1922), The Glorious Fool (1922), and Quicksands (1923).

== Personal life and death ==
Helene's great-grandparents were the founders of Chadwicks, New York, a small village in Oneida County, NY. Her great-grandfather built a cotton factory on Sauquoit Creek and was one of the premier manufacturers of textiles in the Mohawk Valley. Her family came from England, in Oldham, Lancashire County. She attended school at a one-room schoolhouse provided by her great-grandfather for the mill workers.

Chadwick married Louis Fontaine in July 1915 in Geneva, New York. They separated after he returned from serving in World War I, and he became aware that she cared for someone else. They eventually were divorced. In January 1919, Chadwick became engaged to William A. Wellman, an American pilot with the Lafayette Flying Corps. He had just returned from France and was cited for bravery for his valor in World War I. The couple had met at a party at the house of a friend. Wellman was signed to play a prominent role in an upcoming movie with Douglas Fairbanks Sr. The couple wed on July 2, 1921, separated in July 1923, and were divorced in September 1923. At the time of their separation, Wellman was directing movies for Fox Film.

Chadwick's funeral was conducted by Pierce Brothers Mortuary and attended by stage and screen friends. Cause of death was cirohosis of the liver. Her body was returned to Chadwicks and she was first buried in the Sauquoit Valley Cemetery and the following year her remains were moved to Forest Hill Cemetery, Utica.

== Filmography ==
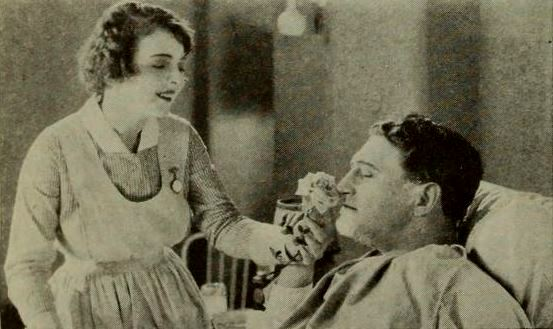
Helene Chadwick and Richard Dix in The Glorious Fool (1922)

Year	Title	Role	Notes
1916	The Challenge	Alberta Bradley	
1917	The Mystery of the Double Cross		Lost film
1917	The Iron Heart	Grace	Lost film
1917	Blind Man's Luck	Helen	Lost film
1917	The Last of the Carnabys	The Kept Woman	Lost film
1917	The Angel Factory	Florence Lamont	Lost film
1917	Vengeance Is Mine	Marion De Long	Lost film
1918	Convict 993	Neva Stokes	Lost film
1918	For Sale	Annie	Lost film
1918	The Naulahka	Kate Sheriff	Lost film
1918	The House of Hate	Queenie Kate	Lost film
1918	The Yellow Ticket	Miss Seaton	Lost film
1918	Getaway Kate	Kate Sherwood	Short; Lost film
1918	Go-Get-Em Garringer	Wilma Wharton	Lost film
1919	Girls	Kate West	Lost film
1919	Heartsease	Margaret Neville	
1919	Caleb Piper's Girl	Mary Piper	
1919	The Solitary Sin	Mary	Lost film
1919	A Very Good Man	Ruth Douglas	Lost film
1919	The Long Arm of Mannister	Sylvia De La Mere	Lost film
1919	An Adventure in Hearts	Countess D'Orano	Lost film
1920	The Cup of Fury	Marie Louise - 'Mamise'	Lost film
1920	Godless Men	Ruth Lytton	
1920	Scratch My Back	Madeline	
1920	Cupid the Cowpuncher	Macie Sewell	Lost film
1920	Cupid		Lost film
1921	Dangerous Curve Ahead	Phoebe Mabee	Lost film
1921	Made in Heaven	Claudia Royce	Lost film
1921	From the Ground Up	Philena Mortimer	
1921	The Old Nest	Emily at 22	
1922	The Sin Flood	Poppy	Lost film
1922	The Glorious Fool	Jane Brown	Lost film
1922	Yellow Men and Gold	Bessie	Lost film
1922	The Dust Flower	Letty Gravely	Lost film
1922	Brothers Under the Skin	Millie Craddock	Incomplete film
1923	Gimme	Fanny Daniels	Lost film
1923	Quicksands	The Girl	Lost film
1923	Reno	Mrs. Emily Dysart Tappan	
1924	The Masked Dancer	Betty Powell	Lost film
1924	Why Men Leave Home	Irene Emerson	
1924	Love of Women	Cynthia Redfield	Lost film
1924	Her Own Free Will	Nan Everard	Lost film
1924	The Border Legion	Joan Randle	Lost film
1924	Trouping with Ellen	Ellen Llewellyn	Lost film
1924	The Dark Swan	Cornelia Quinn	Lost film
1925	The Re-Creation of Brian Kent	Betty Joe	Lost film
1925	The Woman Hater	Marie Lamont—the Actress	Lost film
1925	The Golden Cocoon	Molly Shannon	
1926	Pleasures of the Rich	Mary Wilson	Lost film Trailer survives Library of Congress
1926	The Still Alarm	Lucy Fay	Lost film
1926	Hard Boiled	Marjorie Gregg	Lost film
1926	Wise Guys Prefer Brunettes	Helene	Short film
1926	Dancing Days	Alice Hedman	
1927	Stage Kisses	Fay Leslie	Lost film
1927	Stolen Pleasures	Doris Manning	Lost film
1927	The Bachelor's Baby	Eleanor Carter	
1927	The Rose of Kildare	Eillen O'Moore	Lost film
1928	Say It With Sables	Helen Caswell	Lost film
1928	Women Who Dare	Stella Mowbray	
1928	Confessions of a Wife	Marion Atwell	
1928	Modern Mothers	Adele Dayton	Lost film
1929	Father and Son	Miss White	
1930	Men Are Like That	Clara Fisher Hyland	
1931	Hell Bound	Sanford's Sister	
1931	Bad Sister	Amy, Sam's Wife	Uncredited
1932	So Big!	Townsperson	Uncredited
1932	Night World	Night Club Customer	Uncredited
1933	Employees' Entrance	Attendee at Meeting of Department Heads	Uncredited
1933	The Circus Queen Murder	Crying Woman	Uncredited
1933	Emergency Call	Miss McCabe - Averill's Secretary	Uncredited
1933	No Marriage Ties	Adrienne Deane's Secretary	Uncredited
1933	Morning Glory	Miss Murray	Uncredited
1933	Merrily Yours	Mrs. Rogers	
1934	Managed Money	Mrs. George Rogers	Short
1934	Good Dame	Mrs. Crosby	Uncredited
1934	School for Girls	Larson	
1934	Ever Since Eve	Governess	Uncredited
1934	It's a Gift	Mrs. Abernathy	Uncredited
1934	A Wicked Woman	Mother	Uncredited
1935	Mississippi	Attendee at Opening	Uncredited
1935	Call of the Wild	Dawson Townswoman	Uncredited
1935	Mary Burns, Fugitive	Prison Matron	Uncredited
1935	School for Girls	Larson	
1935	Another Face	Nurse Daniels	Uncredited; Alternative title: It Happened in Hollywood
1935	Frisco Kid	Saloon Girl	Uncredited
1936	The Perfect Set-Up	Mary	Short; Uncredited
1936	San Francisco	Earthquake Survivor	Uncredited
1936	Pennies from Heaven	Mrs. Arbuthnot	Uncredited
1937	A Star Is Born	Woman at preview	Uncredited

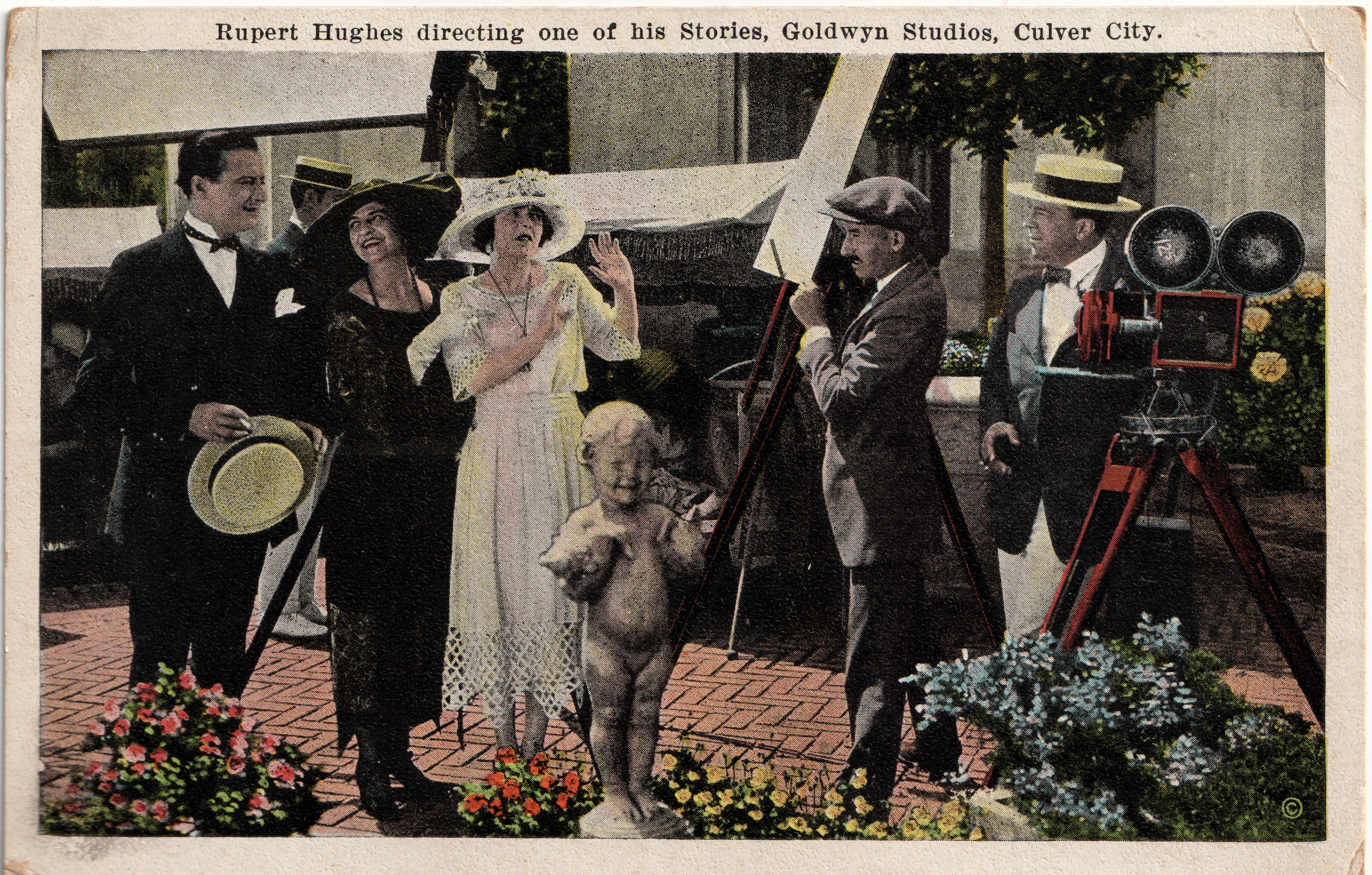
Helene Chadwick (center) taking direction from Rupert Hughes (far right)

== Sources ==
- The Los Angeles Times, "Flashes, Picture Star To Wed", January 11, 1919, Page II3.
- The Los Angeles Times, "She Could Ride", October 15, 1922, Page III30.
- The Los Angeles Times, "Film Star Seeks Divorce", July 24, 1923, Page II1.
- The Los Angeles Times, "Former Star of Films Dies", September 6, 1940, Page A1.
- The Los Angeles Times, "Helene Chadwick Paid Last Honor", September 8, 1940, Page A2.
- The Oakland Tribune, "Cinema Close-Ups", June 3, 1923, Page 92.
