= Dangerous Curve Ahead =

1921 film

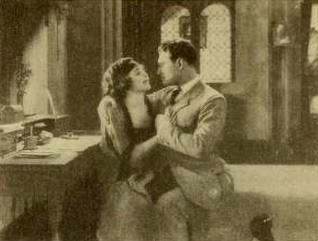
- Helene Chadwick and Richard Dix
- Directed by: E. Mason Hopper; William J. Reiter (Assistant Director)
- Written by: Rupert Hughes (Story); Julien Josephson
- Starring: Helene Chadwick; Richard Dix
- Cinematography: John J. Mescall
- Distributed by: Goldwyn Pictures Corporation
- Release date: October 2, 1921
- Running time: 50 minutes
- Country: United States
- Language: Silent (English intertitles)

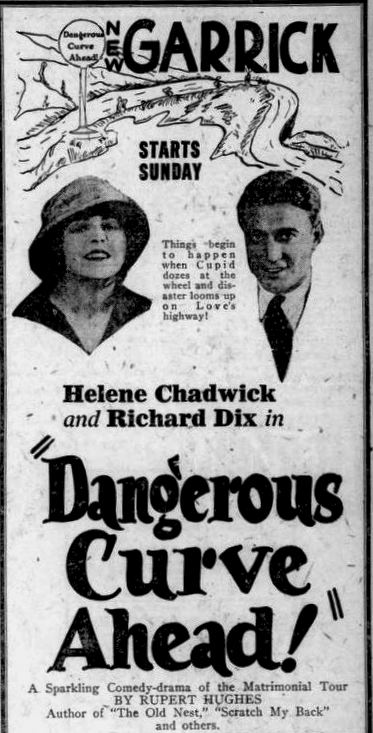

Dangerous Curve Ahead is a 1921 American silent comedy starring Helene Chadwick and Richard Dix. The film is considered to be lost.

== Plot ==
As described in a film magazine, Phoebe Mabee is a much sought after small town belle who quarrels with her fiancé Harley Jones after a flirtation with city youth Anson Newton. After a period of weepy repentance the engagement is renewed and they are wed. After the children come, there is a hiatus in the domesticity of the couple. Jones is sent abroad by his job and she her children spend the summer at a watering place, where Phoebe meets her city charmer and the romance interrupted by her marriage is renewed. Phoebe develops social ambitions and these are helped along by Newton's aunt Mrs. Nixon, who is prominent in society and can help Phoebe get her social whirl. Jones the absent husband returns unexpectedly and finds one of the children ill and Phoebe about to keep an appointment to attend a function at Mrs. Nixon's house. Phoebe waivers between fear that failure to attend the function will end her budding social career and the love of her child. She attends the dinner, leaving her child in the care of a nurse, but during the course of the dinner is overcome with remorse, rushes home and arrives just in time to calm the little fellow, who was calling to her. A reconciliation with the husband follows, with motherly love and home responsibilities conquering over social aspirations.

== Cast ==
- Helene Chadwick as Phoebe Mabee
- Richard Dix as Harley Jones
- Maurice 'Lefty' Flynn as Anson Newton
- James Neill as Mr. Mabee
- Edythe Chapman as Mrs. Mabee
- Kate Lester as Mrs. Nixon
- Newton Hall as Phoebe's son

== See also ==
- List of lost silent films (1920–24)
- List of lost films
