= Sally, Irene and Mary =

Sally, Irene and Mary may refer to:

- Sally, Irene and Mary (1925 film), an American silent comedy drama film
- Sally, Irene and Mary (1938 film), an American comedy film
