= Don't (1925 film) =

1925 film

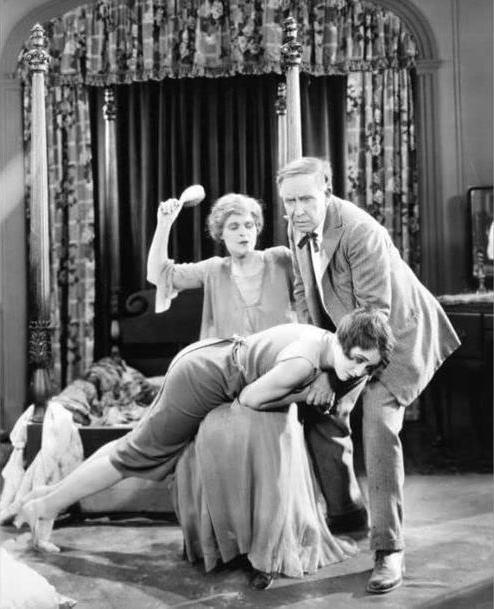
- Still with DeWitt Jennings, Ethel Wales, and Sally O'Neil
- Directed by: Alfred J. Goulding
- Written by: Agnes Christine Johnston (screenplay); Rupert Hughes (story)
- Starring: Sally O'Neil; John Patrick; Bert Roach; Ethel Wales
- Cinematography: Max Fabian
- Distributed by: Metro-Goldwyn-Mayer
- Release date: November 15, 1925
- Running time: 60 minutes
- Country: United States
- Language: Silent (English intertitles)

Don't is a 1925 American silent comedy film directed by Alfred J. Goulding, starring Sally O'Neil, [John Patrick, Bert Roach, and Ethel Wales, and released by Metro-Goldwyn-Mayer. The film is one of the B pictures the studio produced to keep the Loews circuit and other cinemas supplied.

The screenplay by Agnes Christine Johnston is based on the story "Don't You Care!" by Rupert Hughes.

== Plot ==
As described in a film magazine review, Mr. Moffat selects Abel Totem as a prospective husband for his daughter Tracey, but the parent-defying flapper engages in a school-girl flirtation with Gilbert Jenkins which develops into a real love affair. Gilbert owns an automobile and the rebellious Tracey, dodging a family outing at an amusement park, goes riding with him. They have a variety of whimsical adventures, and in the end Gilbert wins out with the family and Mr. Moffat agrees to their marriage.

== Cast ==
- Sally O'Neil as Tracey Moffat
- John Patrick as Gilbert Jenkins
- Bert Roach as Uncle Nat
- James W. Morrison as Abel
- Estelle Clark as Jane
- DeWitt Jennings as Mr. Moffat
- Ethel Wales as Mrs. Moffat
- Johnny Fox as Horace Moffat
- Dorothy Seay as Nettie Moffat
- Evelyn Peirce as Marian Jenkins
- Helen Hoge as The Child
- Brinsley Shaw as The Tramp

== Preservation ==
Don't is considered to be a lost film.

== See also ==
- List of lost films
