= Excuse Me (1915 film) =

1915 film by Henry W. Savage

- Directed by: Henry W. Savage
- Written by: Rupert Hughes (play)
- Produced by: Henry W. Savage
- Production company: Henry W. Savage Inc.
- Distributed by: Pathé Exchange
- Release date: December 31, 1915 (U.S.)
- Running time: 50 min
- Country: United States

Excuse Me is a 1915 American comedy silent black and white film directed by Henry W. Savage, written by Rupert Hughes and distributed by Pathé Exchange.

== Cast ==
- George F. Marion as Porter
- Geraldine O'Brien as Marjorie Newton
- Vivian Blackburn as Mrs. Jim Wellington
- Robert Fischer as Jim Wellington
- Harrison Ford as Lt. Harry Mallory
- J.B. Hollis
