= Jazz Heaven =

1929 film by Melville W. Brown

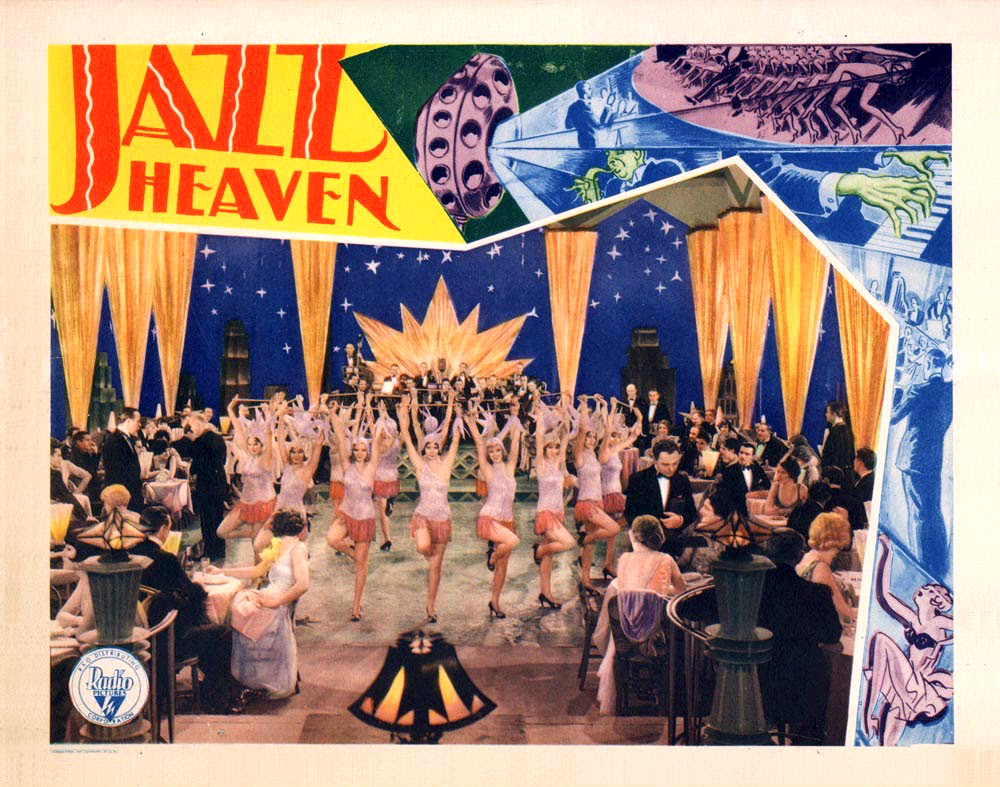
- Lobby card
- Directed by: Melville Brown
- Screenplay by: Myles Connolly; J. Walter Ruben
- Story by: Pauline Forney; Dudley Murphy
- Produced by: Myles Connolly
- Starring: John Mack Brown; Sally O'Neil; Clyde Cook
- Cinematography: Jack MacKenzie
- Edited by: Ann McKnight; George Marsh
- Music by: Sidney Clare; Oscar Levant
- Production company: RKO Pictures
- Distributed by: RKO Pictures
- Release dates: October 30, 1929 (New York City); November 3, 1929 (United States)
- Running time: 68 minutes
- Country: United States
- Language: English

Jazz Heaven is a 1929 American pre-Code romantic comedy film directed by Melville Brown and written by Myles Connolly and J. Walter Ruben, based on a story by Pauline Forney and Dudley Murphy. It was moderately successful for RKO Pictures, and was released in both sound and silent versions.

== Plot ==
Barry Holmes is a poor songwriter from the south who travels to New York City to be a success, bringing with him his prize possession, his piano. While trying to break into Tin Pan Alley, he stays at a boardinghouse run by Mrs. Langley, who insists that her house always be run with the highest propriety. Ruth Morgan lives in the room next to Holmes. One night, he annoys the entire boarding house as he is trying to complete his song "Someone". He is stuck on the ending until he hears Ruth humming how she thinks it should go. Stunned, he goes to her room and invites her back to his to finish the song. Unfortunately, Mrs. Langley discovers the two unmarried people in his room, and summarily kicks him out, intending to keep his piano as payment for back rent.

Ruth works for music publisher Kemple and Klucke and plots to get them to publish Holmes' song. Both of her bosses are interested in Ruth, even though Kemple is quite a bit older than her. The two partners make a bet that the younger Klucke cannot take Ruth out to dinner. Ruth makes a deal with Kemple not to agree to the dinner, but changes her mind when Klucke agrees to listen to Holmes' song if she accompanies him.

Mrs. Langley's husband, Max, has a soft spot for the young couple, and attempts to sneak Holmes' piano out of the rooming house. Unfortunately, in the attempt, the piano is dropped down a flight of stairs, and broken into pieces. Distraught, Ruth and Barry are stuck on how they will finish the song in order to pitch it to Kemple and Klucke. To make up for the loss of the piano, Max sneaks them into a piano factory during the night, where they finalize the song. Unknown to them, the factory also has an open microphone to a radio station, and the song is actually broadcast over the air. The song is an instant hit, and a bidding war starts between Kemple and Klucke and Parker Pianos for the rights to the song. Holmes is a success, and, of course, ends up getting the girl.

== Cast ==
- Sally O'Neil as Ruth Morgan
- Johnny Mack Brown as Barry Holmes (as John Mack Brown)
- Clyde Cook as Max Langley
- Joseph Cawthorn as Herman Kemple
- Albert Conti as Walter Klucke
- Blanche Friderici as Mrs. Langley
- Henry Armetta as Tony

== Reception ==
Mordaunt Hall of The New York Times gave the film a mixed review and an overall good rating, while criticizing some of the individual plot points.

== See also ==
- List of early sound feature films (1926–1929)
