= The Deaf Mute =

- Directed by: Allen Ramsey
- Written by: Rupert Hughes
- Produced by: Thomas A. Edison
- Cinematography: Joe Physiog
- Production company: Edison Company
- Distributed by: American Talking Picture Company
- Release date: 1913
- Country: United States

The Deaf Mute is a 1913 American short war drama black and white film directed by Allen Ramsey, written by Rupert Hughes and produced by Thomas A. Edison. It is the only Kinetophone film shot outside a sound stage.

== Cast ==
- Robert Lawrence as Brigadier General Eldred, U.S.A.
- W.B. Wainwright as Captain Morey, U.S.A.
- Henry Grady as Captain Leigh, U.S.A.
- Robert Lett as Sergeant Giluley, U.S.A.
- George Ballard as Edison Quartette
- O.J. McCormack as Edison Quartette
- Leo Parmet as Edison Quartette
- H.L. Wilson as Edison Quartette
