= From the Ground Up (film) =

1921 film

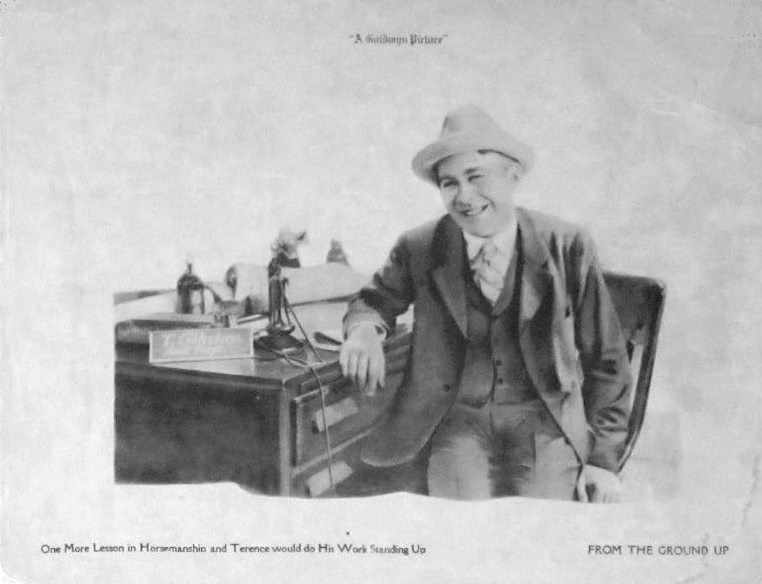
- Lobby card
- Directed by: E. Mason Hopper
- Story by: Rupert Hughes
- Based on: Short story by Rupert Hughes
- Cinematography: John J. Mescall
- Production company: Goldwyn Pictures Corporation
- Distributed by: Export Film Distribution; Goldwyn Pictures Corporation
- Release date: December 1921
- Country: United States

From the Ground Up is a 1921 American comedy silent black and white film directed by E. Mason Hopper and based on the short story by Rupert Hughes.

== Cast ==
- Tom Moore as Terence Giluley
- Helene Chadwick as Philena Mortimer
- DeWitt Jennings as Mr. Mortimer
- Grace Pike as Mrs. Mortimer
- Hardee Kirkland as Carswell Sr
- Darrell Foss as Carswell Jr
