= Becky (1927 film) =

1927 film by John P. McCarthy

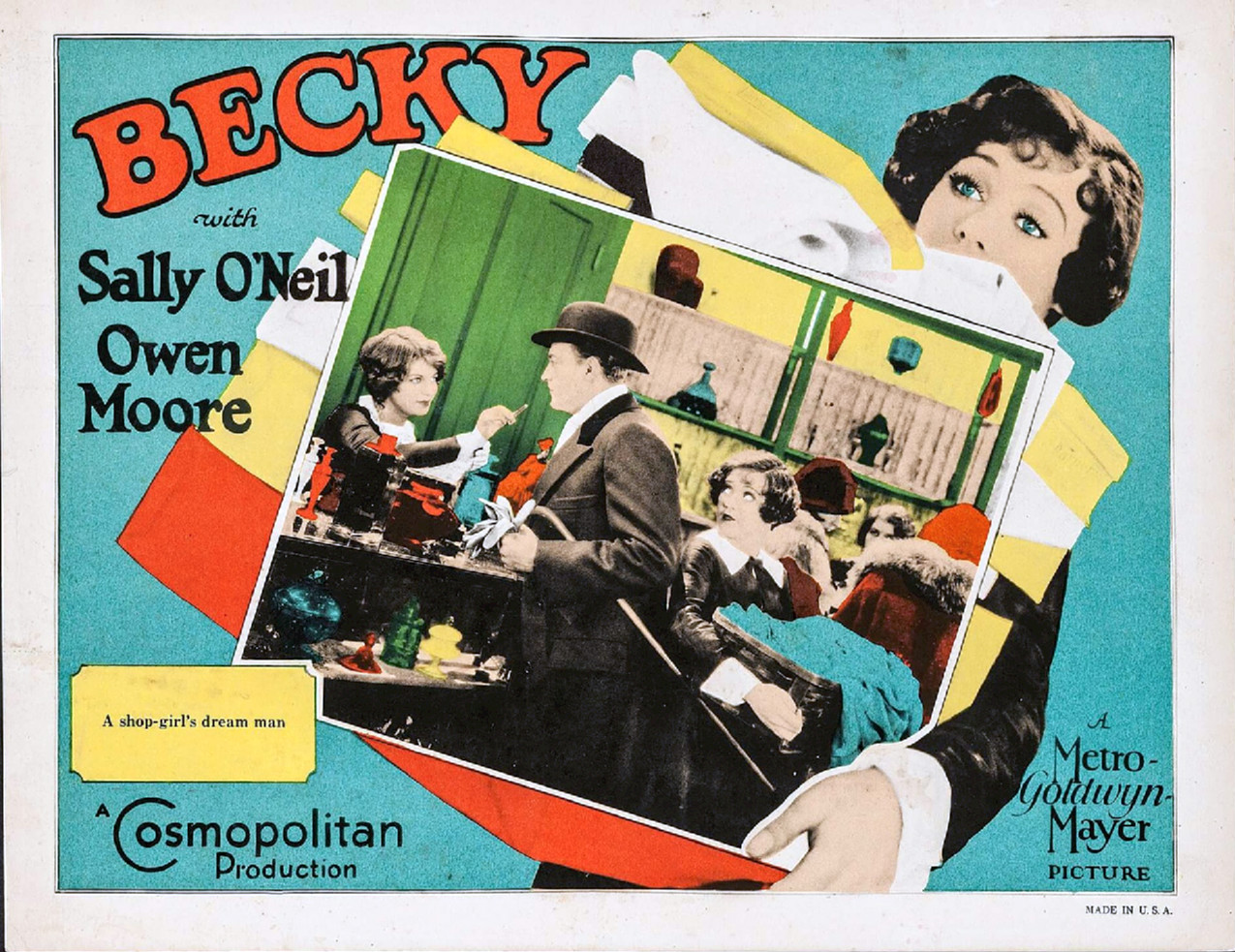
- Lobby card
- Directed by: John P. McCarthy
- Written by: Marian Constance Blackton; Joseph W. Farnham (titles)
- Story by: Raynor Selig
- Starring: Owen Moore; Sally O'Neil
- Cinematography: John Arnold
- Edited by: John English
- Production company: Cosmopolitan Productions
- Distributed by: Metro-Goldwyn-Mayer
- Release date: November 12, 1927
- Running time: 7 reels
- Country: United States
- Language: Silent (English intertitles)

Becky is a 1927 American silent comedy film directed by John P. McCarthy starring Sally O'Neil and Owen Moore. It was produced by Cosmopolitan Productions.

== Synopsis ==
Rebecca (Sally O'Neil) is a salesgirl who gets a chance at a Broadway show; there, she attracts and is ultimately rejected by a society playboy.

== Cast ==
- Sally O'Neil as Rebecca O'Brien McCloskey
- Owen Moore as Dan Scarlett
- Harry Crocker as John Carroll Estabrook
- Gertrude Olmstead as Nan Estabrook
- Mack Swain as Irving Spiegelberg
- Claude King as Boris Abelard
- Caroline Dine as Young girl
