= William J. Reiter =

American film director

- Born: August 16, 1889; Richmond, Virginia, USA
- Died: September 29, 1979 (aged 90); Hollywood, California, USA
- Occupation: assistant director
- Years active: 1920-1937

William J. Reiter (August 16, 1889 – September 29, 1979) was an American assistant director who was nominated during the 6th Academy Awards for the short lived Best Assistant Director category.

== Filmography ==
All of these he was the assistant director for unless indicated.

- The Man Who Had Everything (1920) (credited as Billy Reiter)
- Dangerous Curve Ahead (1921)
- The Sea Hawk (1924) (Research by)
- Broadway (1929)
- By Candlelight (1933)
- Ladies Must Love (1933) (Credited as William Reiter)
- Are We Civilized? (1934)
- The Black Cat (1934)
- Let's Be Ritzy (1934)
- The Man Who Reclaimed His Head (1934)
- One Exciting Adventure (1934)
- Transatlantic Merry-Go-Round (1934)
- The Great Impersonation (1935)
- A Notorious Gentleman (1935)
- Princess O'Hara (1935)
- Crash Donovan (1936)
- Sutter's Gold (1936)
- Let Them Live (1937)
