= The Cup of Fury (film) =

1920 film by T. Hayes Hunter

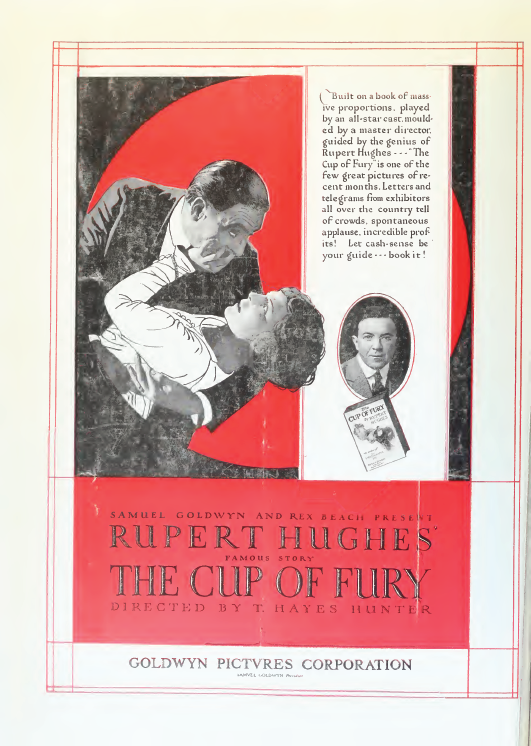
- Advertisement
- Directed by: T. Hayes Hunter
- Written by: Richard Schayer
- Based on: The Cup of Fury by Rupert Hughes
- Starring: Helene Chadwick; Rockliffe Fellowes; Frank Leigh
- Cinematography: Abe Scholtz
- Production company: Eminent Authors Pictures
- Distributed by: Goldwyn Pictures Corporation
- Release date: January 1920
- Running time: 50 minutes
- Country: United States
- Language: Silent (English intertitles)

The Cup of Fury is a 1920 American silent drama film directed by T. Hayes Hunter and starring Helene Chadwick, Rockliffe Fellowes, and Frank Leigh. It is not known whether the film currently survives.

== Plot ==
As described in a film magazine, Davidge (Fellowes), while on business in London for the United States government, attends a dinner given by wealthy Germans, Sir Joseph Webling (Standing) and his wife Lady Webling (Lester). He meets their adopted daughter Marie (Chadwick) and recalls having seen her before in America, where she was billed as "Mamsie" in a vaudeville act. That evening Scotland Yard's secret service men raid the Weblings and their daughter, whereupon she confesses that she is an American and is allowed to return to the United States. The Weblings take poison and die before the detectives can prevent it. Mamsie obtains employment in a ship builder's office under Davidge. The secret launching of a ship is innocently disclosed by Mamsie to her brother-in-law, a confessed member of the Industrial Workers of the World, who in turn advises a German spy. The ship is destroyed off Cape Charles by a German U-boat. Mamsie then proposes to run down the criminals and, while employed as a "passer boy," unearths a scheme to blow up the dockyards. She notifies Davidge and he comes to her assistance, throws the criminals into the ocean, and saves the dockyards.

== Cast ==
- Helene Chadwick as Marie Louise, 'Mamsie'
- Rockliffe Fellowes as Davidge
- Frank Leigh as Nicky
- Clarissa Selwynne as Lady Clifton-Wyatt
- Kate Lester as Lady Webling
- Herbert Standing as Sir Joseph Webling
- Florence Deshon as Polly Widdicombe
- T.D. Crittenden as Major Widdicombe
- Sidney Ainsworth as Verrinder
- Kewpie Morgan as Jake
- Marion Colvin as Abbie
- Wade Boteler as Larry
- Elinor Hancock as Mrs. Prothero

== Bibliography ==
- Goble, Alan. The Complete Index to Literary Sources in Film. Walter de Gruyter, 1999.
