= Stolen Pleasures =

1927 film

- Directed by: Phil Rosen
- Written by: Leah Baird
- Produced by: Harry Cohn
- Starring: Helene Chadwick; Gayne Whitman; Dorothy Revier
- Cinematography: J. O. Taylor
- Production company: Columbia Pictures
- Distributed by: Columbia Pictures
- Release date: January 5, 1927 (US)
- Running time: 6 reels
- Country: United States
- Language: Silent...English intertitles

Stolen Pleasures is a 1927 American silent drama film, directed by Phil Rosen. It stars Helene Chadwick, Gayne Whitman, and Dorothy Revier, and was released on January 5, 1927. It was produced and released by Columbia Pictures.

== Cast ==
- Helene Chadwick as Doris Manning
- Gayne Whitman as John Manning
- Dorothy Revier as Clara Bradley
- Ray Ripley as Herbert Bradley
- Harland Tucker as Guy Summers

== Preservation ==
With no prints of Stolen Pleasures located in any film archives, it is considered a lost film.
