= Society for Sale =

1918 film

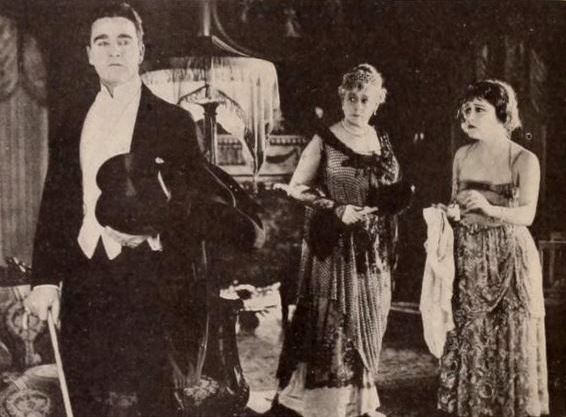
- Film still with William Desmond, Lillian Langdon, and Gloria Swanson
- Directed by: Frank Borzage
- Written by: Charles J. Wilson
- Story by: Ruby M. Ayres
- Starring: William Desmond; Gloria Swanson
- Cinematography: Pliny Horne
- Distributed by: Triangle Film Corporation
- Release date: April 21, 1918
- Running time: 5 reels
- Country: United States
- Language: Silent (English intertitles)

Society for Sale is a 1918 American silent drama film directed by Frank Borzage and starring William Desmond and Gloria Swanson. It is not known whether the film currently survives, which suggests that it is a lost film.

== Plot ==
As described in a film magazine, the Honorable Billy (Desmond), through his love for Vi Challoner (West) and its attendant expense, finds himself in financial straits and is deserted by the cause of his trouble. In his plight he is approached by Phyllis Clyne (Swanson), who wishes to be introduced into society and is willing to pay for the deception. Honorable Billy seeks to break the agreement when Phyllis apparently becomes enamored with Lord Sheldon (Prior), whose affairs are the subject of gossip. She refuses him his liberty and accuses him of jealousy. After an automobile crash in which Lord Sheldon is killed, she confesses to Billy that he was her father. She then convinces Billy that their engagement should be permanent.

== Cast ==
- William Desmond as Honorable Billy
- Gloria Swanson as Phyllis Clyne
- Herbert Prior as Lord Sheldon
- Charles Dorian as Furnival
- Lillian West as Vi Challoner
- Lillian Langdon as Lady Mary

== Reception ==
Like many American films of the time, Society for Sale was subject to cuts by city and state film censorship boards. For example, the Chicago Board of Censors cut, in Reel 4, four near views of a woman in low-cut gown seated on couch with Furnival.
