= Wise Guys Prefer Brunettes =

1926 film

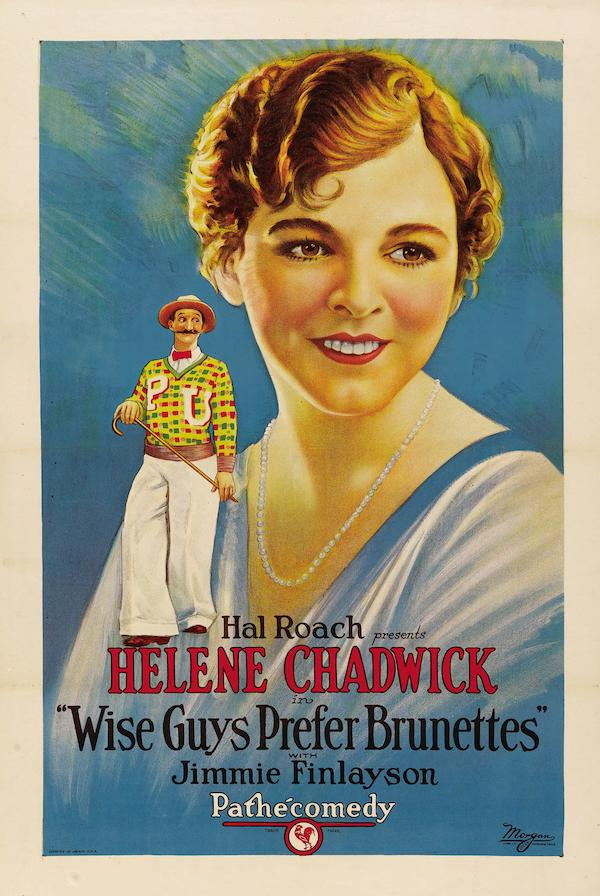
- Film poster
- Directed by: F. Richard Jones; Stan Laurel
- Written by: H. M. Walker (titles)
- Produced by: Hal Roach
- Starring: James Finlayson; Ted Healy; Burr McIntosh; Charlotte Mineau; Helene Chadwick; Tyler Brooke; Sammy Brooks; William Courtright
- Cinematography: Harry W. Gerstad, Len Powers
- Edited by: Richard C. Currier
- Distributed by: Pathé Exchange
- Release date: October 3, 1926
- Running time: 20 minutes
- Country: United States
- Language: Silent (English intertitles)

Wise Guys Prefer Brunettes is an American silent comedy film directed by F. Richard Jones and Stan Laurel, starring James Finlayson, Ted Healy, Charlotte Mineau, and Helene Chadwick. It was released by Pathé Exchange on October 3, 1926.

== Plot ==
Helene Chadwick plays a like-named student at Pinkham University who runs a shop selling sexy gowns. The dean (James Finlayson) believes that Helene's shop is behind the recent breakdown of campus discipline and wants her expelled. Meanwhile, Ted Healy—portraying Napoleon Fizz, PU's "11-year freshman"—has been developing a rejuvenating plaster. He and Helene conspire to test it on the dean. It works, transforming Finlayson into the campus Romeo. Helene and Napoleon promptly usher him into a compromising situation at a women's sorority house, and he is found emerging from the plaster's effects just as the university's president (Burr McIntosh) shows up.

== Cast ==
- James Finlayson as Stan Pincher (credited as Jimmie Finlayson)
- Ted Healy as Napoleon Fizz
- Charlotte Mineau as The Matron
- Helene Chadwick as Helene (uncredited)
- Burr McIntosh as The President (uncredited)
- Tyler Brooke as Faculty member (uncredited)
- Sammy Brooks as Undetermined secondary role (uncredited)
- Clarence Courtright as Faculty member (uncredited)
- Helen Gilmore as Undetermined secondary role (uncredited)
- Clara Guiol as Co-ed (uncredited)
- Martha Sleeper as Waitress (uncredited)

== Production ==
The film's title, clearly a play on the 1925 comic novel, Gentlemen Prefer Blondes, by Anita Loos, was the brainchild of H. M. Walker, as were all of the film's title cards. Perhaps returning the favor, Loos dubbed her novel's sequel, published in December 1927, But Gentlemen Marry Brunettes.

Vaudevillian Ted Healy made his screen debut here, as well as his only pre-talkie appearance. As for Stan Laurel, this may have been his final credited directorial assignment; shortly after the film's release, he was starting to be paired onscreen with Oliver Hardy, en route to the team's official debut on October 8, 1927, in The Second Hundred Years.

== Reception ==
Despite some positive reviews in the trades, the film failed to generate much interest and Healy's fledgling film career was put on hold for another four years. Likewise, the film did little to alter the downward trajectory of its curiously uncredited leading lady, Helene Chadwick.
