= Ruby M. Ayres =

British novelist

- Ayres in September 1933.
- Born: Ruby Mildred Ayres; 28 January 1881; Watford, London, UK
- Died: 14 November 1955 (aged 74); Weybridge, Surrey, UK
- Occupation: Writer
- Spouse(s): Reginald William Pocock (1909–40s; his death)
- Writing career
- Period: 1912–55
- Genre: Romance

Ruby Mildred Ayres (28 January 1881 – 14 November 1955) was a British romance novelist, "one of the most popular and prolific romantic novelists of the twentieth century".

== Personal life ==
Ayres was born in Watford on 28 January 1881, the third daughter of London-based architect Charles Pryor Ayres and his wife Alice (née Whitford). In 1909 she married insurance broker Reginald William Pocock. She died on 14 November 1955 at home in Weybridge, Surrey, aged 74, of a combination of pneumonia and a cerebral thrombosis. She was cremated four days later at Golders Green in north London.

== Career ==
Ayres stated that she had started to write as a girl, and said that she had been expelled from school at the age of 15 for the offence of writing what she described as "an advanced love story", although there is no corroboration for her claim. Her first story was published in a magazine shortly after her marriage in 1909, and in 1912 she published her first novel, Castles in Spain. In September 1915, with her first popular success, Richard Chatterton, V.C. (which sold over 50,000 copies in the first three years), she moved publishing houses to Hodder and Stoughton, where she remained until her death in 1955. She wrote over 135 novels over her career, mostly for Hodder, as well as a number of serialised works.

She has been referred to as an "over-productive romance writer", and was possibly an inspiration for the P. G. Wodehouse character Rosie M. Banks. Wodehouse intentionally chose the name "Rosie M. Banks" to be similar to hers, stating in a 1955 letter to his biographer Richard Usborne that he "wanted a name that would give a Ruby M. Ayres suggestion". Several of her works became films and she did screenwriting for Society for Sale among others. She also corresponded with Douglas Sladen.

In the late 1930s, she was targeted in a prospective study by W. H. Auden - alongside such figures as John Buchan and Henry Williamson - as representative of the proto-Fascist in English writing, perhaps because of her glorification of the wartime soldier-hero. During the late 1930s, she wrote an advice column in the Oracle, complimented as "extremely sensible" by George Orwell in an essay on the media consumption of the working class.

== Partial bibliography ==
- Castles in Spain (1912)
- Richard Chatterton, V.C. (1915)
- Paper Roses (1916)
- The Black Sheep (1917)
- The Second Honeymoon (1918)
- The Girl Next Door (1919)
- The Beggar Man (1920)
- Master Man (1920)
- A Bachelor Husband (1920)
- The Second Honeymoon (1921)
- The Uphill Road (1921)
- The Street Below (1922)
- The Man the Women Loved (1923)
- The Romance of a Rogue (1923)
- Ribbons and Laces (1924)
- A Man of His Word (1926)
- Spoilt Music (1926)
- The Planter of the Tree (1927)
- Heartbreak Marriage (1929)
- Love Changes (1929)
- Giving Him Up (1930)
- In the Day's March (1930)
- The Big Fellah (1931)
- The Princess Passes (1931)
- Changing Pilots (1932)
- Look To the Spring (1932)
- So Many Miles (1932)
- By the World Forgot (1933)
- Much Loved (1934)
- All Over Again (1934)
- Feather (1935)
- Happy Endings (1935)
- The Man in Her Life (1935)
- Some Day (1935)
- Compromise (1936)
- Afterglow (1936)
- Our Avenue (1936)
- Somebody Else (1936)
- Too Much Together (1936)
- Owner Gone Abroad (1937)
- The Sun and the Sea (1937)
- Follow a Shadow (1937)
- Unofficial Wife (1937)
- High Noon (1938)
- One To Live With (1938)
- Return Journey (1938)
- There Was Another (1938)
- Big Ben (1939)
- The Moon in the Water (1939)
- Weep for Love (1939)
- The Tree Drops a Leaf (1939)
- Little and Good (1940)
- The Little Sinner (1940)
- The Constant Heart (1941)
- Lost Property (1943)
- April's Day (1945)
- Where Are You Going? (1946)
- Young Shoulders (1947)
- Missing the Tide (1948)
- The Day Comes Round (1949)
- Steering by a Star (1949)
- The Man From Ceylon (1950)
- The Man Who Lived Alone (1950)
- Autumn Fires (1951)
- The Story of Fish and Chips (1951)
- Twice a Boy (1951)
- One Sees Stars (1952)
- One Woman Too Many (1952)
- Love Without Wings (1953)
- The Youngest Aunt (1954)

== Filmography ==
- The Longer Voyage (1915, short film)
- Somewhere in France (UK, 1915)
- Society for Sale (1918)
- The Model's Confession (1918)
- Castles in Spain (UK, 1920)
- A Bachelor Husband (UK, 1920)
- The Man Without a Heart (1924)
- The Woman Hater (1925)
- Romance of a Rogue (1928)
- Second Honeymoon (1930)
- High Noon (UK, 1977), part of a romance series by Thames Television with dramatisations of Moths by Ouida, Three Weeks by Elinor Glyn, The Black Knight by Ethel M. Dell, Emily by Jilly Cooper and House of Men by Catherine Marchant.
