= The Glorious Fool =

1922 film

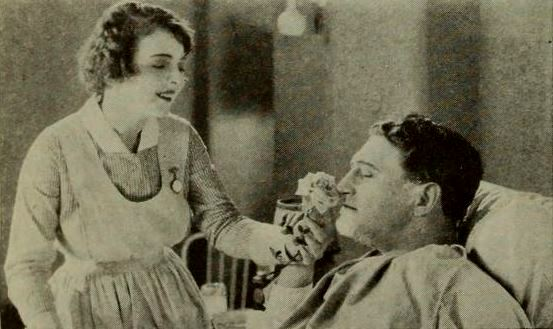
- Directed by: E. Mason Hopper
- Written by: J.G. Hawks
- Based on: Stories by Mary Roberts Rinehart
- Starring: Helene Chadwick; Richard Dix; Vera Lewis
- Cinematography: John J. Mescall
- Production company: Goldwyn Pictures
- Distributed by: Goldwyn Pictures
- Release date: January 15, 1922
- Running time: 50 minutes
- Country: United States
- Languages: Silent; English intertitles

The Glorious Fool is a 1922 American silent romantic comedy drama film directed by E. Mason Hopper and starring Helene Chadwick, Richard Dix and Vera Lewis. It was based on the short stories In the Pavillion and Twenty-Two by Mary Roberts Rinehart.

== Cast ==
- Helene Chadwick as Jane Brown
- Richard Dix as Billy Grant
- Vera Lewis as Miss Hart
- Kate Lester as Head Nurse
- Otto Hoffman as Dummy
- John Lince as Jenks
- Theodore von Eltz as Senior Surgical Interne
- Frederick Vroom as Mr. Lindley Grant
- Lillian Langdon as Mrs. Lindley Grant
- George Cooper as Al

== Bibliography ==
- Connelly, Robert B. The Silents: Silent Feature Films, 1910-36, Volume 40, Issue 2. December Press, 1998.
- Munden, Kenneth White. The American Film Institute Catalog of Motion Pictures Produced in the United States, Part 1. University of California Press, 1997.
