= The Challenge (1916 film) =

1916 silent film

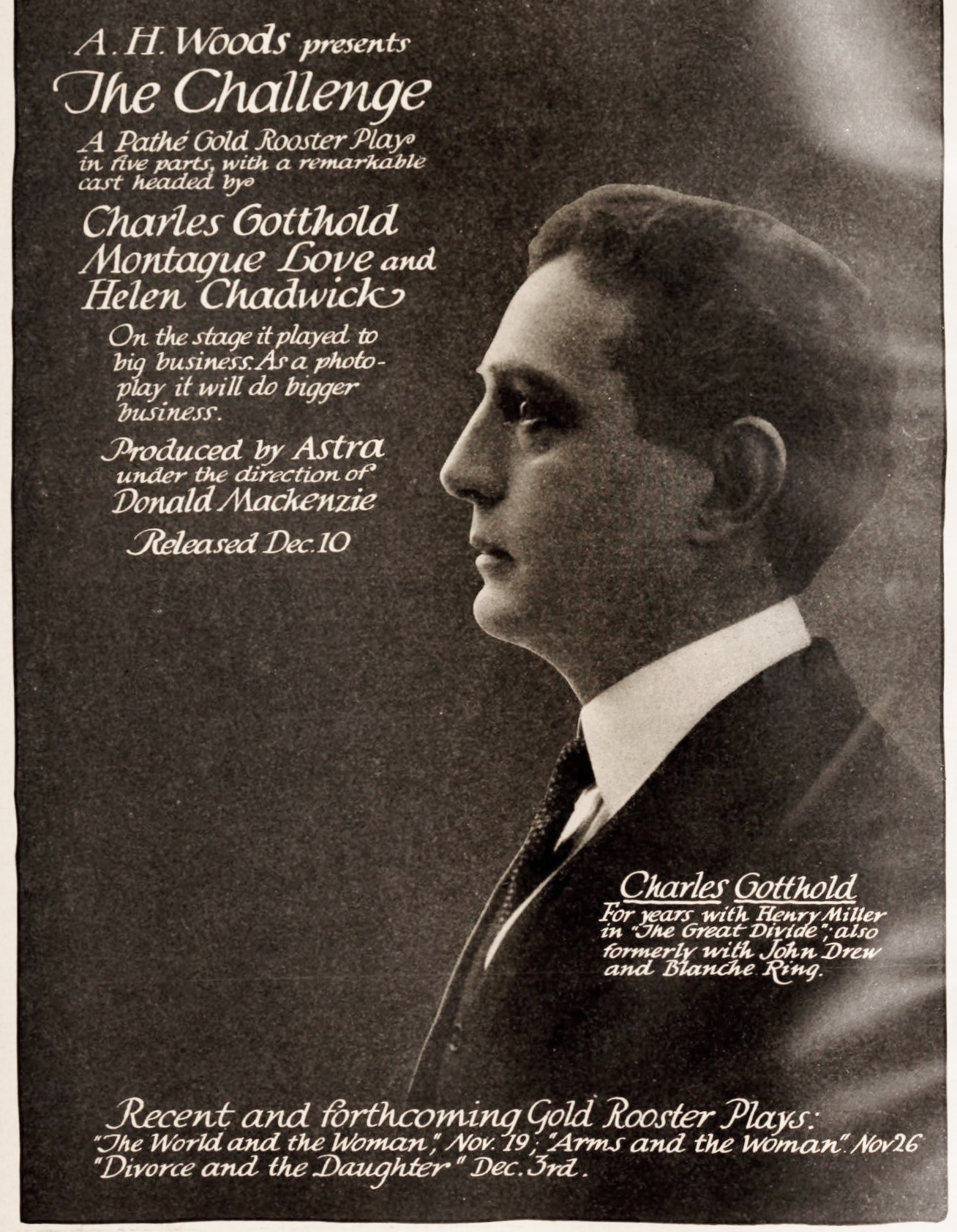
- Directed by: Donald MacKenzie
- Written by: Edward Childs Carpenter (play); Bertram Millhauser
- Starring: Montagu Love; Helene Chadwick; Charles Gotthold
- Cinematography: Harry Wood
- Production company: Astra Film
- Distributed by: Pathe Exchange
- Release date: December 10, 1916
- Running time: 50 minutes
- Country: United States
- Language: Silent (English intertitles)

The Challenge is a 1916 American silent drama film directed by Donald MacKenzie and starring Montagu Love, Helene Chadwick, and Charles Gotthold. The film was adapted from a 1911 play by Edward Childs Carpenter.

== Cast ==
- Montagu Love as Quarrier
- Helene Chadwick as Alberta Bradley
- Charles Gotthold as Robert Lester
- Ben Hendricks Sr.

== Bibliography ==
- Donald W. McCaffrey & Christopher P. Jacobs. Guide to the Silent Years of American Cinema. Greenwood Publishing, 1999. ISBN 0-313-30345-2
