= Remembrance (1922 film) =

1922 film by Rupert Hughes

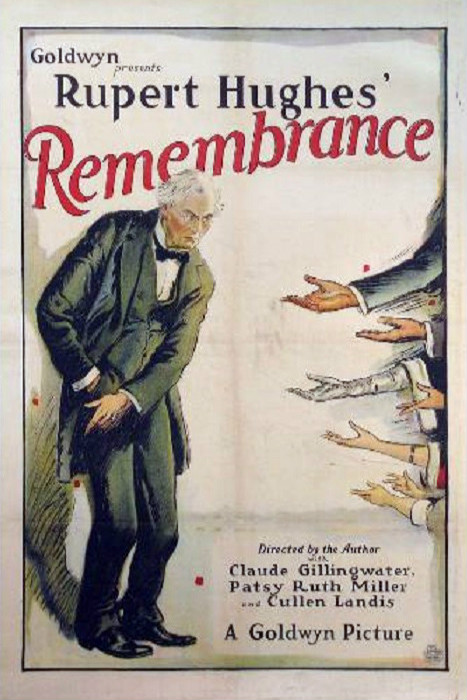
- poster
- Directed by: Rupert Hughes
- Written by: Rupert Hughes (based on his own story)
- Produced by: Goldwyn Pictures
- Starring: Claude Gillingwater
- Cinematography: Norbert Brodine
- Distributed by: Goldwyn Pictures
- Release date: October 1, 1922
- Running time: 60 minutes
- Country: United States
- Language: Silent (English intertitles)

Remembrance is a 1922 American silent drama film written and directed by Rupert Hughes and starring Claude Gillingwater. It was produced and distributed by Goldwyn Pictures.

== Cast ==
- Claude Gillingwater as John P. Grout
- Kate Lester as Mrs. Grout
- Patsy Ruth Miller as Mab
- Cullen Landis as Seth Smith
- Max Davidson as Georges Cartier
- Richard Tucker as J. P. Grout Jr.
- Dana Todd as Ethelwolf Grout
- Nell Craig as Julia
- Esther Ralston as Beatrice
- Helen Hayward as Mrs. Frish
- Lucille Ricksen as Child
- Arthur Trimble as Child
- William A. Carroll as MacClune
- Guinn "Big Boy" Williams (uncredited)

== Preservation ==
In February 2021, Remembrance was cited by the National Film Preservation Board on their Lost U.S. Silent Feature Films list and is therefore presumed lost.
