= American Writers Association =

Anti-communist organization

The American Writers Association (AWA) was an organization formed in 1946 in opposition to an attempt to introduce a form of trade unionism for authors. Its members included writers such as Bruce Barton, John Dos Passos, John Erskine, James T. Farrell, John T. Flynn, Rupert Hughes, Zora Neale Hurston, Clarence Budington Kelland, Clare Boothe Luce, Eugene Lyons, Margaret Mitchell, Ayn Rand, Dorothy Thompson and Louis Waldman.

The organization formed as a response to the "Cain Plan", a proposal put forth by the novelist and screenwriter James M. Cain. In July 1946, Cain proposed that an "American Authors' Authority" be created to act as a central repository for copyrights, and additionally negotiating collectively for authors to give them greater bargaining power. The AWA opposed this plan. Many AWA members considered the Cain Plan to be an attempt by Communists to gain control over copyrights. Flynn compared the Authority's board of governors to the politburo of the Soviet Union. Cain responded by referring to members of the AWA as "reactionary, almost incomprehensibly censorious".

In September 1946, a group of 50 writers signed a joint letter to Elmer Rice, president of the Authors League of America, to announce the group's formation. The AWA soon found backing from radio and film producers, as well as newspaper editors and publishers. The group held meetings and began a newsletter. Erskine was initially elected as the group's leader, but he was soon succeeded by Hughes. Flynn, Lyons and Waldman were selected for a "strategy committee".

The Cain Plan was quickly defeated, but the AWA continued to exist for several years after. In 1949, the group supported the Contempt of Congress citations against the Hollywood Ten by the House Committee on Un-American Activities. That same year the AWA denounced the Cultural and Scientific Conference for World Peace as a "fraud", saying its Russian delegates were "prisoners" of that country's Communist authorities.

== Works cited ==
- Burns, Jennifer (2009). Goddess of the Market: Ayn Rand and the American Right. New York: Oxford University Press. ISBN 978-0-19-532487-7.
- Fine, Richard (1992). James M. Cain and the American Authors' Authority. University of Texas Press. ISBN 0-292-74024-7.
- Hoopes, Roy (1982). Cain. New York: Holt, Rinehart and Winston. ISBN 0-03-049331-5.
- Moser, John E. (2005). Right Turn: John T. Flynn and the Transformation of American Liberalism. New York: New York University Press. ISBN 0-8147-5700-6.
