= E. Mason Hopper =

American film director

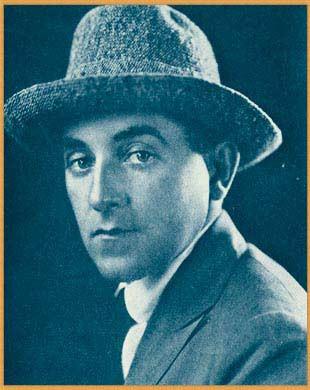
- E. Mason Hopper (1920)
- Born: December 6, 1885; Enosburgh, Vermont, USA
- Died: January 3, 1967 (aged 81); Los Angeles, California, USA
- Occupations: Film director, actor
- Years active: 1911-1935

E. Mason Hopper (December 6, 1885 – January 3, 1967) performed in vaudeville and with stock companies, played pro baseball, and studied at the University of Maryland before becoming a successful film director.

Hopper began directing silent comedy shorts for Essanay in 1911. Just as Essanay was collapsing in 1916, he went into directing features, some of which remain well known among classic film buffs – Gloriana (1916), Hong Kong Nights (1935), Square Shoulders (1929) and No Living Witness (1932).

Hopper continued directing talkies through 1935. He emerged a few years later to take bit parts in the films Slightly Dangerous (1943), The Man from Down Under (1943), Big Jack (1949), Riding High (1950), and Sunset Boulevard (1950).

== Partial Filmography ==
=== Director ===
- The Regenerates (1917)
- The Hidden Spring (1917)
- The Tar Heel Warrior (1917)
- Wife or Country (1918)
- Boston Blackie's Little Pal (1918)
- Her American Husband (1918)
- Unexpected Places (1918)
- As the Sun Went Down (1919)
- Dangerous Curve Ahead (1921)
- From the Ground Up (1921)
- Hold Your Horses (1921)
- All's Fair in Love (1921)
- Brothers Under the Skin (1922)
- The Glorious Fool (1922)
- Hungry Hearts (1922)
- Daddy (1923)
- The Love Piker (1923)
- Janice Meredith (1924)
- The Crowded Hour (1925)
- Paris at Midnight (1926)
- The Wise Wife (1927)
- Getting Gertie's Garter (1927)
- The Night Bride (1927)
- The Rush Hour (1928)
- Square Shoulders (1929)
- Their Own Desire (1929)
- Wise Girls (1929)
- Temptation (1930)
- Shop Angel (1932)
- Alias Mary Smith (1932)
- Malay Nights (1932)
- Sister to Judas (1932)
- Midnight Morals (1932)
- One Year Later (1933)
- Hong Kong Nights (1935)

=== Actor ===
- Slightly Dangerous (1943) - Man in Newspaper Office (uncredited)
- The Man from Down Under (1943) - Desk Clerk (uncredited)
- Big Jack (1949) - Townsperson (uncredited)
- Riding High (1950) - Spectator (uncredited)
- Sunset Boulevard (1950) - Doctor (uncredited)
