= Quicksands (1923 film) =

1923 film by Jack Conway

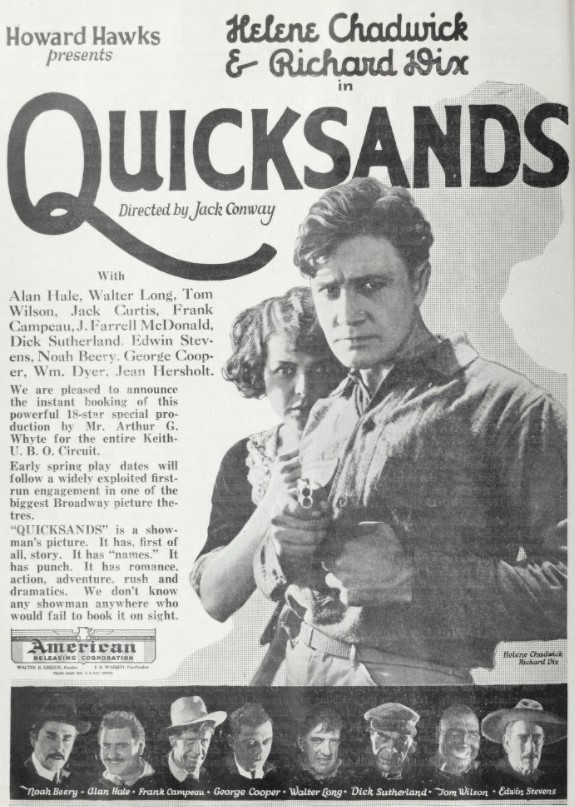
- Trade advertisement
- Directed by: Jack Conway
- Screenplay by: Howard Hawks
- Produced by: Howard Hawks
- Starring: Helene Chadwick; Richard Dix; Alan Hale Sr. Noah Beery; J. Farrell MacDonald; George Cooper; Tom Wilson
- Cinematography: Glen MacWilliams; Harold Rosson
- Production company: Agfar Corporation
- Distributed by: American Releasing Corporation
- Release date: February 28, 1923
- Running time: 70 minutes
- Country: United States
- Language: Silent (English intertitles)

Quicksands is a 1923 American silent crime drama film directed by Jack Conway, written by Howard Hawks, and starring Helene Chadwick and Richard Dix. The supporting cast features Alan Hale Sr., Noah Beery and Jean Hersholt. The film was released on February 28, 1923, by American Releasing Corporation.

== Plot ==
Lt. Brill, a U.S. Army officer assigned to stop a narcotics ring on the Mexico–United States border, breaks up with his girlfriend after discovering her working as a dancer the drug kingpin 'Silent' Krupz's cantina. However, he discovers she is actually an undercover Secret Service agent working with her father Farrell at the U.S. Customs Service. The three are captured by Krupz but are rescued by the Army.

== Cast ==
- Helene Chadwick as The Girl
- Richard Dix as Lt. Bill
- Alan Hale Sr. as Ferrago
- Noah Beery as 'Silent' Krupz
- J. Farrell MacDonald as Col. Patterson
- George Cooper as Matt Patterson
- Tom Wilson as Sgt. Johnson
- Dick Sutherland as Cupid
- Hardee Kirkland as Farrell
- Louis King as Barfly
- Jean Hersholt as Ring Member
- Walter Long as Ring Member
- Jack Curtis as Ring Member
- William Dyer as Ring Member
- Frank Campeau as Ring Member
- Edwin Stevens as Ring Member
- James Marcus as Ring Member
- Lionel Belmore as Ring Member

== Production ==
The film was shot both on a studio in Melrose Avenue, Hollywood, and on location in Fort Huachuca, Arizona. Real U.S. Army soldiers, including United States Colored Troops, were used as extras.

After the American Releasing Corporation went out of business, it was purchased by the Paramount Famous Lasky Corporation for re-release as Boots and Saddles. Dix tried to stop the re-release and offered $1 million to be released from his contract with Paramount, but the studio refused.

== Censorship ==
Before Quicksands could be released in Kansas, the Kansas Board of Review required the elimination of two intertitles saying "I'm going to pay my respects to our little prisoner" and "If there are any respects to be paid, I'll do it myself." A scene of a black man shooting a white man was also removed.

== Preservation ==
With no prints of Quicksands in any film archives, it is currently a lost film.
