= Gimme (film) =

1923 film

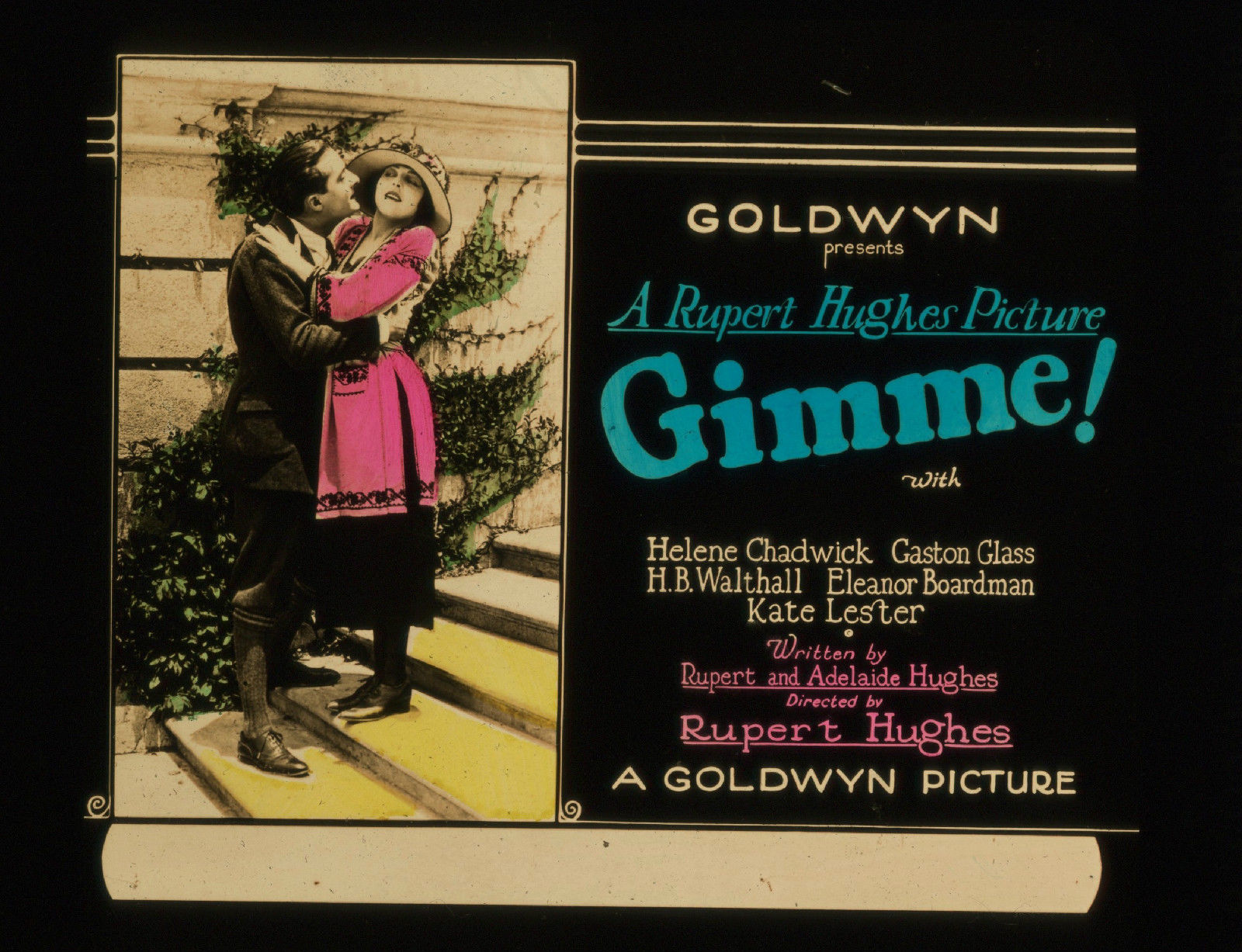
- Lantern slide
- Directed by: Rupert Hughes
- Story by: Adelaide Hughes; Rupert Hughes
- Cinematography: John J. Mescall
- Production company: Goldwyn Pictures Corporation
- Distributed by: Goldwyn Distributing Company; Films Erka
- Release date: January 14, 1923 (U.S.)
- Running time: 60 min
- Country: United States
- Language: Silent (English intertitles)

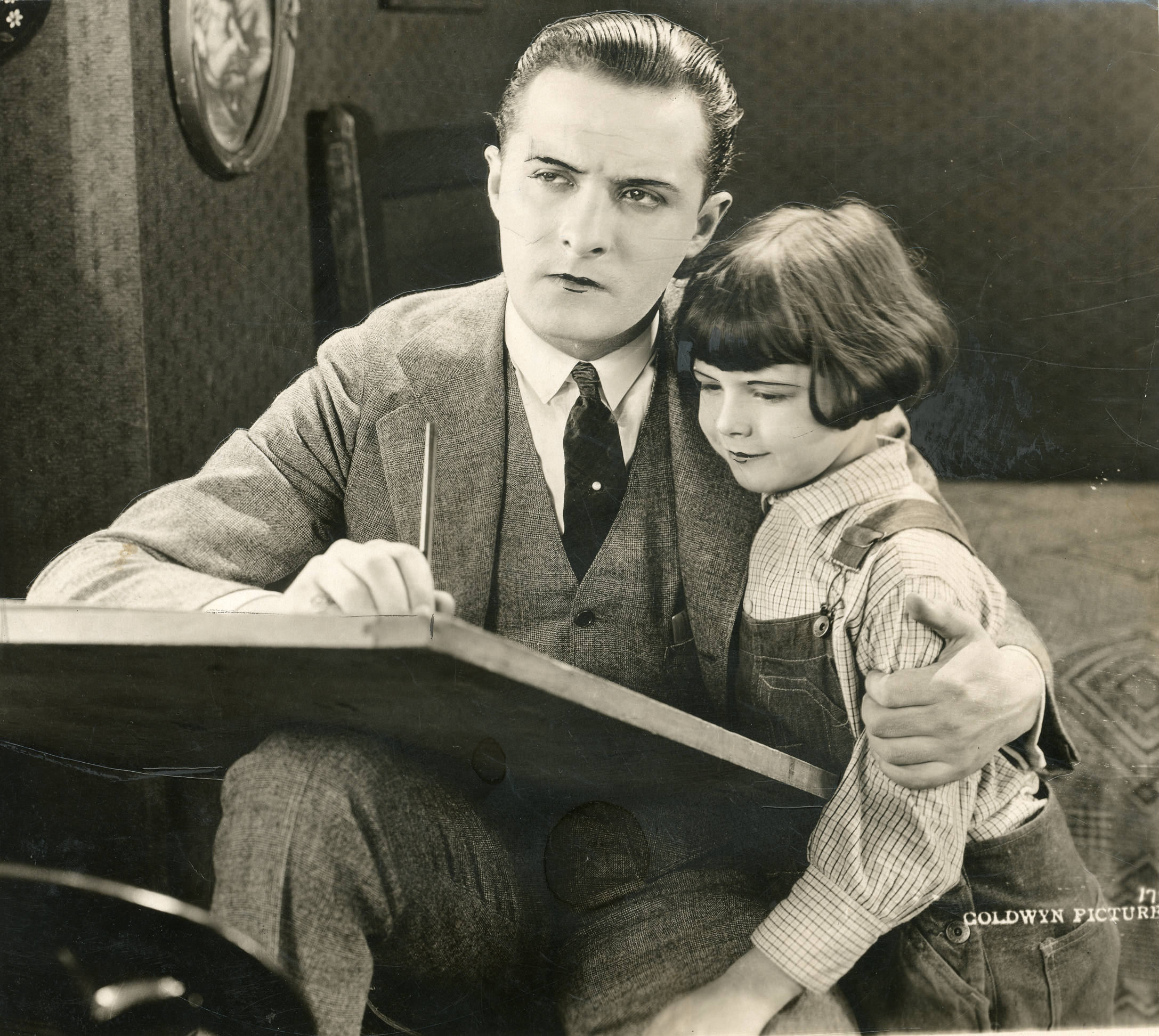
Gimme photo

Gimme is a 1923 American comedy silent black and white film directed by Rupert Hughes and starring Helene Chadwick and May Wallace. This film along with Charge It (1921) and Ladies Must Dress (1927) encouraged women to be flappers and to increase their consumerism.

== Plot ==
As described in a film magazine, Fanny Daniels (Chadwick), after a short, successful career as a designer for Claude Lambert's (Imboden) establishment, meets, falls in love with, and marries wealthy young man Clinton Ferris (Glass). She had borrowed $500 from Claude to buy her trousseau for the wedding and now Claude demands its return. Fanny, embarrassed and unable to reconcile her former financial independence with asking her husband for money, goes back to work for Claude while Clinton is away on a trip. She uses a blank check given her by her husband to clear up her indebtedness with Claude, which puts Clinton in a financial hole. When he returns, he assumes the worst regarding the check and they quarrel and Fanny leaves. The marital difficulty is cleared up when Clinton discovers that Fanny is not and has never been romantically involved with Claude. The couple reconcile and agree to live on a fifty-fifty financial basis.

== Cast ==
- Helene Chadwick as Fanny Daniels
- Gaston Glass as Clinton Ferris
- Kate Lester as Mrs. Roland Ferris
- Eleanor Boardman as Clothilde Kingsley
- David Imboden as Claude Lambert
- May Wallace as Mrs. Cecily McGimsey
- Georgia Woodthorpe as Annabel Wainwright
- Henry B. Walthall as John McGimsey
- Jean Hope as Lizzie
- Bertram Anderson-Smith as Roger Wayne
- Robert DeVilbiss as Child
- Sheila Harkness as Child
- Betty O'Brien as Child

== Reception ==
Exhibitor's Trade Review praised Gimme as having a "thoroughly modern" theme involving a situation that could arise in any home and stated that a theater audience "got" the film.

== Preservation ==
With no prints of Gimme located in any film archives it is a lost film.
