= The Bachelor's Baby =

1927 film

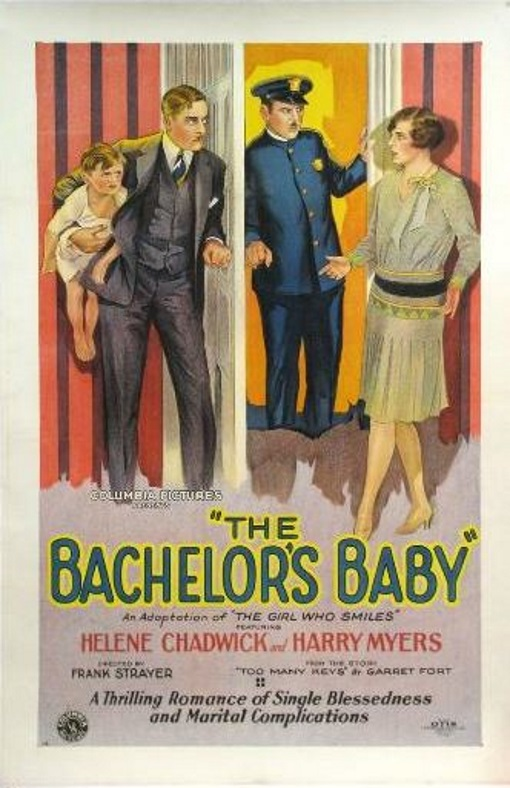
- Directed by: Frank R. Strayer
- Written by: Julien Sands
- Story by: Garrett Fort
- Produced by: Harry Cohn
- Starring: Helene Chadwick
- Cinematography: J.O. Taylor
- Distributed by: Columbia Pictures
- Release date: February 20, 1927
- Running time: 56 minutes
- Country: United States
- Languages: Silent; English intertitles

The Bachelor's Baby is a 1927 American silent comedy film directed by Frank R. Strayer and produced and distributed by Columbia Pictures. An extant film survives in a European archive.

== Cast ==
- Helene Chadwick - Eleanor Carter
- Harry Myers - Bill Taylor
- Midget Gustav - Mr. Boppo
- Edith Yorke - Mrs. Carter
- Blanche Payson - Mrs. Boppo
- Pat Harmon - Hardboiled Hogan
- James A. Marcus - Colonel Carter
