= All's Fair in Love (1921 film) =

1921 film

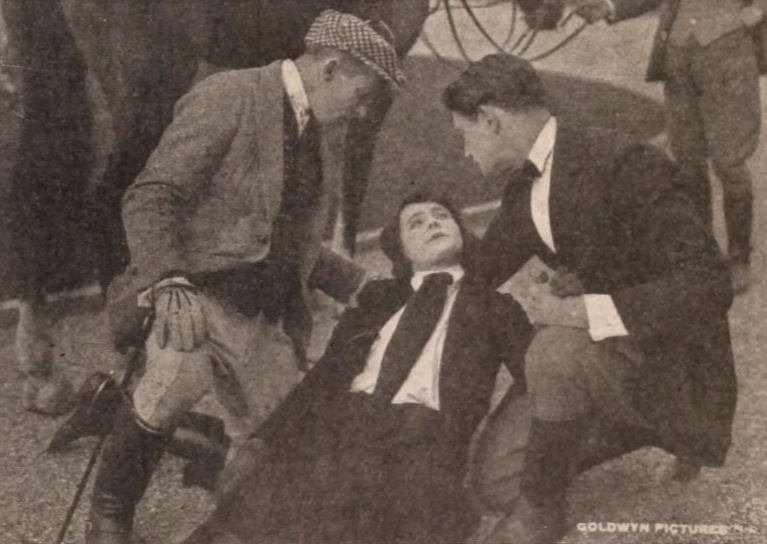
- Directed by: E. Mason Hopper
- Written by: Arthur F. Statter
- Based on: The Bridal Path by Thompson Buchanan
- Starring: May Collins; Richard Dix; Raymond Hatton
- Cinematography: John J. Mescall
- Production company: Goldwyn Pictures
- Distributed by: Goldwyn Pictures
- Release date: September 1921
- Running time: 50 minutes
- Country: United States
- Languages: Silent; English intertitles

All's Fair in Love is a lost 1921 American silent romantic comedy film directed by E. Mason Hopper and starring May Collins, Richard Dix and Raymond Hatton. It was produced and distributed by Goldwyn Pictures. It is based on the 1913 Broadway play The Bridal Path by Thompson Buchanan.

== Cast ==
- May Collins as Natalie Marshall
- Richard Dix as Bobby Cameron
- Marcia Manon as Vera
- Raymond Hatton as Craigh Randolph
- Stuart Holmes as Rogers
- Andrew Robson as Marshall

== Preservation ==
With no holdings located in archives, All's Fair in Love is considered a lost film.

== Bibliography ==
- Munden, Kenneth White. The American Film Institute Catalog of Motion Pictures Produced in the United States, Part 1. University of California Press, 1997.
