= Rupert Hughes =

American novelist (1872–1956)

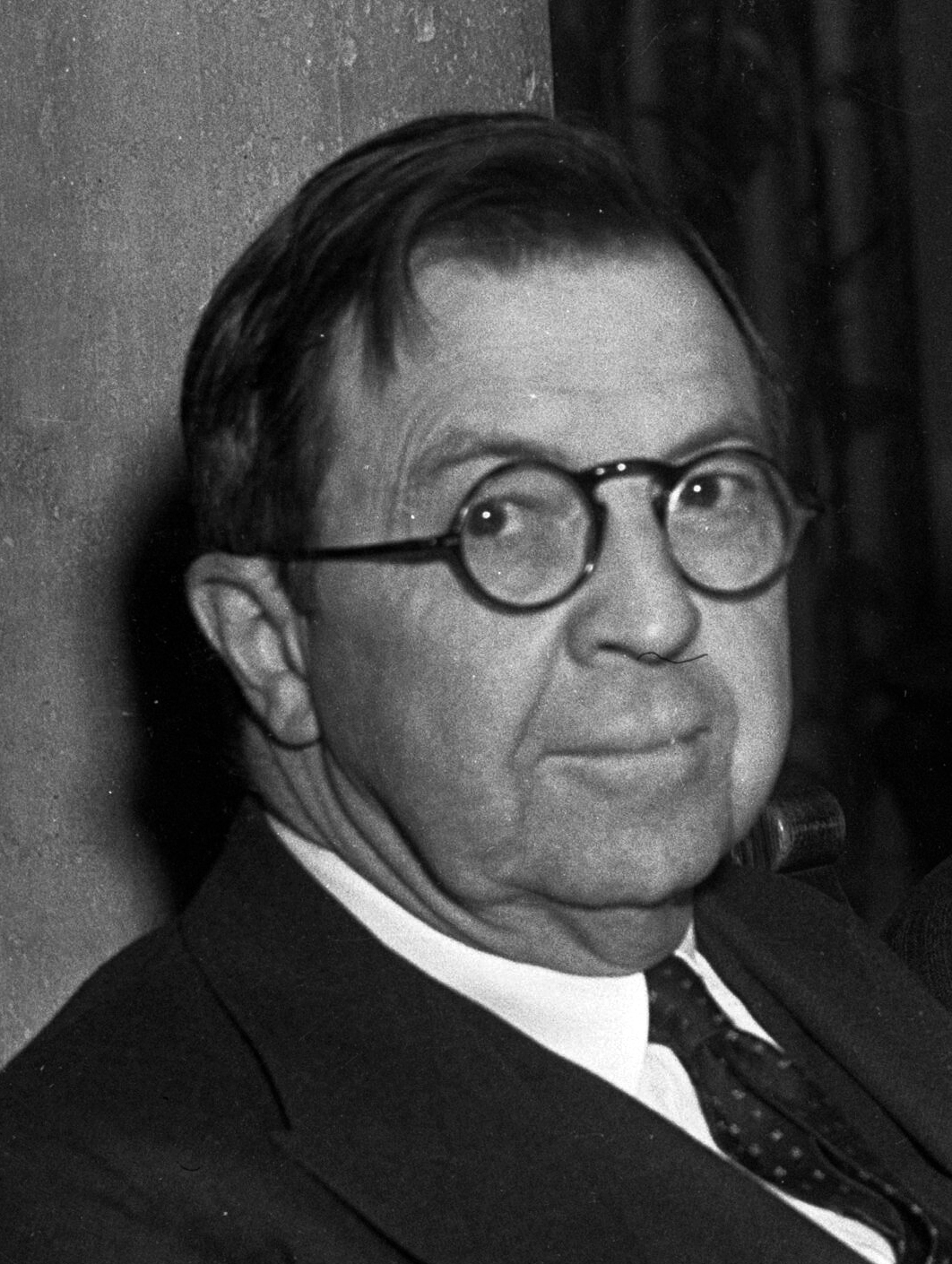
- Hughes in 1935
- Born: Rupert Raleigh Hughes; January 31, 1872; Lancaster, Missouri, U.S.
- Died: September 9, 1956 (aged 84); Los Angeles, California, U.S.
- Occupations: Novelist; historian; film director
- Spouses: Agnes Wheeler Hedge (m. 1893; div. 1903) Adelaide Manola Mould Bissell (m. 1908; died 1923) Elizabeth Patterson Dial (m. 1924; died 1945)
- Children: 1
- Relatives: Howard R. Hughes Sr. (brother); Howard Hughes (nephew)
- Writing career
- Notable works: George Washington: The Human Being and the Hero (1926)

Rupert Raleigh Hughes (January 31, 1872 – September 9, 1956) was an American novelist, film director, Oscar-nominated screenwriter, military officer, and music composer. He was the brother of Howard R. Hughes Sr. and uncle of billionaire Howard R. Hughes Jr. His three-volume scholarly biography of George Washington broke new ground in demythologizing Washington and was well received by historians. A staunch anti-Communist, in the 1940s he served as president of the American Writers Association, a group of anti-Communist writers.

== Early life ==
Hughes was born on January 31, 1872, in Lancaster, Missouri, the son of Jean Amelia (née Summerlin; 1842–1928) and Judge Felix Moner Hughes (1837–1926). He spent his early years in the Lancaster area until age seven when the family moved to Keokuk, Iowa, where his father established a successful law practice.

Hughes first published a poem while still a child growing up in Lancaster. After receiving his basic public education in Keokuk and at a private military academy near St. Charles, Missouri, he attended Western Reserve Academy preparatory school in Hudson, Ohio. At age 16, he entered Adelbert College in Cleveland, Ohio, now known as Case Western Reserve University. Hughes was a noted founding member of the student newspaper The Adelbert beginning in 1890, contributing numerous submissions of poems, satire, comedy, and storytelling. Hughes earned his BA in 1892 and MA in 1894. Intending a career teaching English Literature, he later attended Yale University, earning a second MA in 1899.

== Career ==
=== As writer ===
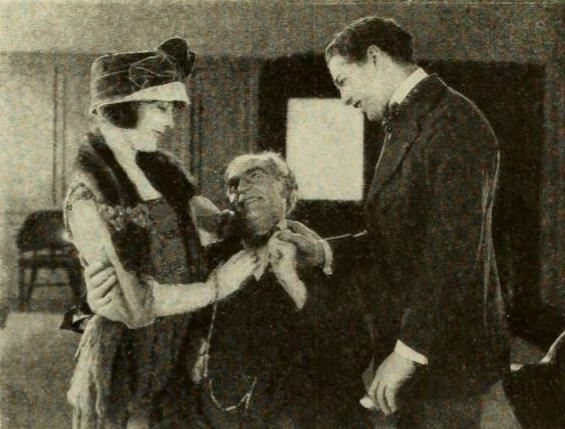
Still from the American film Remembrance with Patsy Ruth Miller, Claude Gillingwater, and Cullen Landis

By the time of his Yale degree, Hughes had already given up the idea of a staid life in academia for a new career as an author. His first book, 1898's The Lakerim Athletic Club, came from a serialized magazine story for boys. Hughes often blurred the lines of job description in his early years, working at various times as a reporter for the New York Journal and editor for various magazines including Current Literature, all the while continuing to write short stories, poetry, and plays.

His first published novel not originally serialized elsewhere was The Whirlwind, published in 1902. Believed to be partly influenced by wartime adventures of his father, the book was set in Civil War-era Missouri.

Hughes moved to London, England in 1901 where he edited The Historians' History of the World, then returned to New York City to help edit the Encyclopædia Britannica from 1902 to 1905. Hughes' Musical Guide (1903) is notable for including a definition for zzxjoanw, a fictitious entry that fooled lexicographers for seventy years.

Some of Hughes' most notable early writing involved music. His American Composers (1900), Love Affairs of Great Musicians (1903), Songs by Thirty Americans and Music Lovers' Cyclopedia (1914) were all well received by the public and critics alike. Hughes was a musician and composed several songs including ones for his first venture as a playwright, the musical comedy The Bathing Girl (1895). In recognition of his musical efforts Hughes was elected an honorary member of the Alpha chapter of Phi Mu Alpha Sinfonia music fraternity at the New England Conservatory in Boston in 1917.

In addition to novels, Hughes was a prolific writer of short stories, with varying numbers well over one hundred credited to him. In a Little Town (1917) allowed Hughes to draw on his small-town roots with fourteen short stories about fictionalized people around Keokuk. In 1920 Harper published Mama and other Unimportant People, a collection of short stories and novelettes which contained the critically acclaimed short story The Stick-in-the-Muds Also in the collection was The Father of Waters, which would be designated as, and republished in, The World's 50 Best Short Novels, a ten-volume compilation published by Funk & Wagnalls in 1929.

Hughes was an essay writer for popular magazines in the 1930s and endorsed the Technocracy movement.

George Washington

In January 1926, Hughes was asked to speak at a meeting of the Sons of the American Revolution in Washington D.C. During the speech he advocated for more truth in the portrayal of the nation's first President, George Washington, pointing out such fables as chopping down a cherry tree, and drawing from Washington's own diary to illustrate some of the man's more human, if less savory, traits and activities. Some in the crowd heckled Hughes during his speech and later gave a disingenuous report of its content to a newspaper. The story rapidly spread across America, with the misquoted Hughes lambasted by everyone from newspaper editors to religious figures and temperance leaders coast-to-coast.

Hughes began the first of a projected four-volume biography of Washington in October 1926. Based on extensive research, George Washington: The Human Being and the Hero covered his life up to the age of thirty. Volume two, George Washington: The Rebel and the Patriot (1927), examined Washington's life prior to and in the early years of the American Revolution from 1762 to 1777. The third volume, George Washington: Savior of the States, 1777–1781 (1930) further examined Washington as a military leader during some of the revolutions darkest days. Hailed by historians as a groundbreaking work, it repaired much of the damage done to Hughes' reputation. An intended fourth volume covering George Washington and his role as the first President of the USA was never completed.

=== Playwright ===
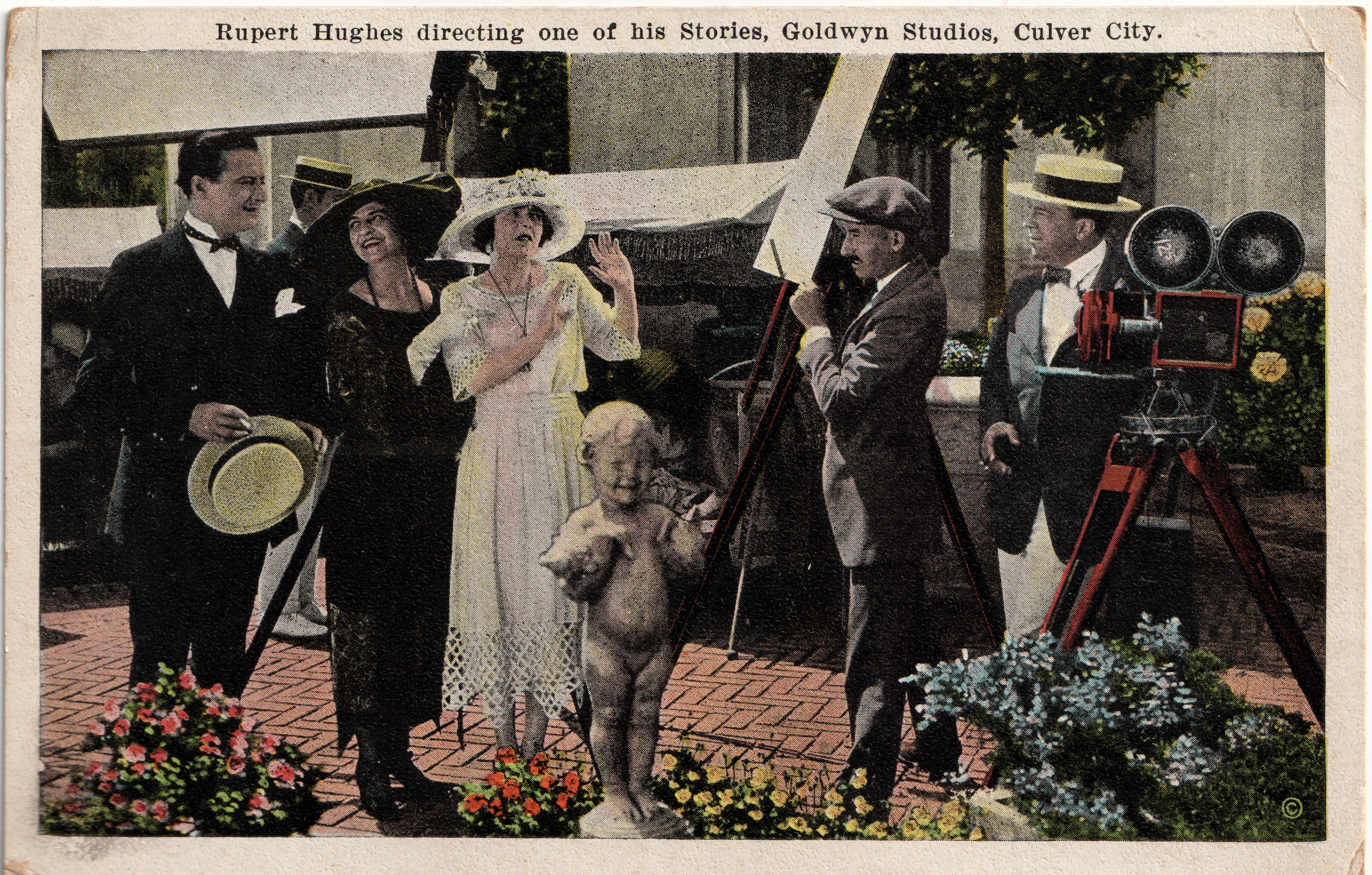
Rupert Hughes (far right) directing one of his stories, Goldwyn Studios, Culver City, circa 1920s

Hughes' first foray into the tough world of New York City theater was a failure. In 1895, with financial backing from his father, Hughes and a business partner staged the aforementioned The Bathing Girl at the Fifth Avenue Theater. It lasted only one performance. He persevered however, and between 1902 and 1909 no less than six Hughes-penned plays were staged by touring companies across the United States and in London, England. Hughes cast his second wife, Adelaide Mould Bissell, alongside a young Douglas Fairbanks in his first New York theater role in the 1908 production All for a Girl. His 1909 play The Bridge, starring Guy Bates Post, ran in New York for a respectable thirty-three performances before going on tour for three years. Hughes' next effort, 1910's Two Women, starring the famed stage actress Leslie Carter, made forty-seven performances before also touring extensively. Excuse Me, a comedy farce based on a train trip, premiered in February 1911 and was one of the years biggest hits in New York that year. It would tour worldwide, including Australia, and later twice be made into movies. A stage version of the novel Tess of the Storm Country followed, and in 1920 Hughes' final play, The Cat Bird, starring John Drew, Jr. In 1921 his novel The Old Nest (1912), based upon his family and early life, was adapted into a movie. Its success led Hughes to move to Hollywood and join the burgeoning motion picture industry in 1923. The behind-the-scenes goings on of show business provided ample fodder for Hughes' novel Souls for Sale (1922), a scathing look at Hollywood scandals of the era. In the 1940s he served as president of the American Writers Association, a group of anti-Communist writers.

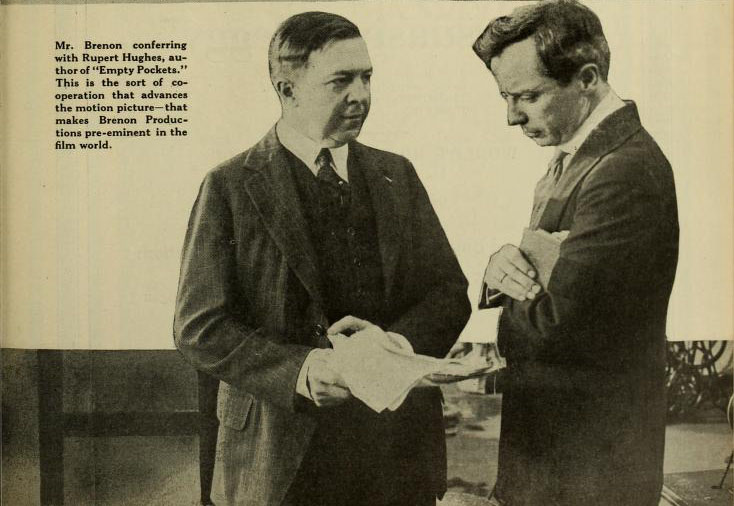
Rupert Hughes (left) with Director Herbert Brenon in 1917

=== Military service ===
Hughes enlisted in the New York National Guard as a private in 1897, serving in the famous 69th New York regiment, the "Fighting 69th". When President Woodrow Wilson sent U.S. troops to Mexico in 1916 in pursuit of bandit Pancho Villa, Hughes, now a captain, and the 69th were one of the regiments assigned to the mission. With America's entry into World War I the following year Hughes expected to see service in France, but a slight hearing impairment prevented him from overseas duty and he was assigned to work in Military Intelligence in Washington, D.C. in early 1918 and promoted to Major. While still a captain, Hughes designed and patented a new type of trench knife for use by the U.S. Army. Containing a spring-loaded blade that extended via push-button, it was similar to what would later be considered a "switchblade". The Hughes Trench Knife was evaluated as a potential military arm by a panel of U.S. Army officers from the American Expeditionary Force (AEF) in June 1918. After testing, however, the board found the Hughes design to be of no value, and it was never adopted. Hughes remained on active duty until mid-1919, meanwhile continuing his writing career in off-duty hours.

Hughes continued his part-time military career after moving to California, joining the state militia. He was a key member of its reorganization in 1940 into the California Army National Guard and as Colonel commanded one of its regiments from 1941 to 1943. At age 71 and with health becoming frail, Colonel Hughes was passed over for service in a combat zone again and retired from military service.

== Personal life ==
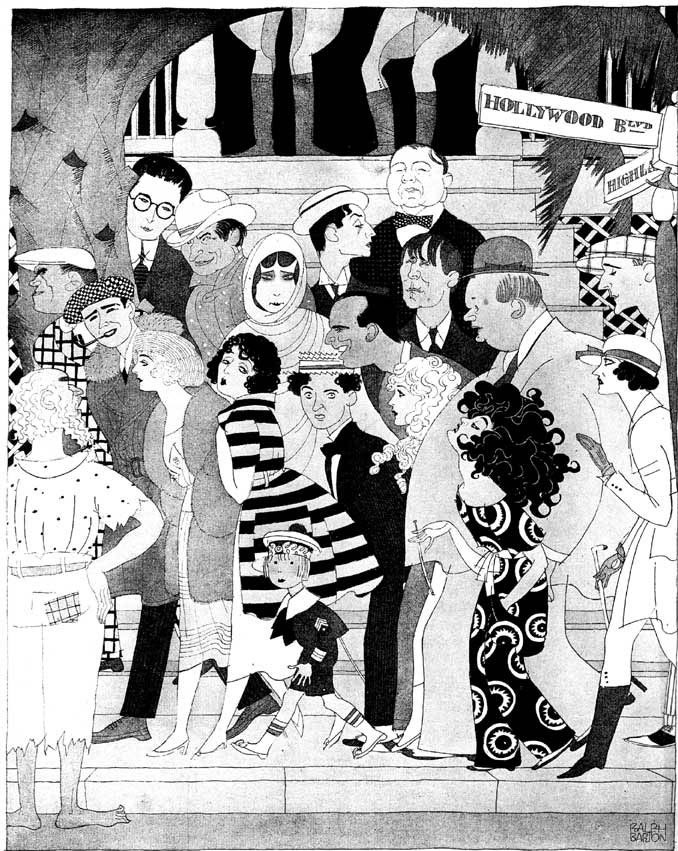
Rupert Hughes (top center) as he appeared with other Hollywood notables in a 1921 Vanity Fair caricature by Ralph Barton

His first marriage, to Agnes Wheeler Hedge in 1893, ended in divorce in 1903. The couple had one child, daughter Elspeth, born in 1897. (In 1981, heirs to Howard Hughes feuding over his estate claimed that Elspeth was not really Rupert Hughes's daughter, but the child of Agnes's illicit lover. Family noted that Rupert had mumps as a child which left him sterile.) His second marriage, to actress Adelaide Manola Mould Bissell, took place in 1908. She starred in his stage production All for a Girl that same year. In December 1923, she died of an apparent suicide while on tour in Hai Phong, French Indochina. Rupert Hughes' final marriage, to Elizabeth Patterson Dial, took place the next year, 1924. The third Mrs. Hughes died from complications of sleeping pills and heart condition in 1945. Hughes' daughter, Elspeth, from his first marriage died a few months later.

Hughes supported Thomas Dewey in the 1944 United States presidential election.

== Death ==
Hughes' health began to fail in the late 1940s, leading to a non-fatal stroke in 1953. He suffered a fatal heart attack while working at his desk on September 9, 1956. Rupert Hughes is buried in Forest Lawn Memorial Park, Glendale in suburban Los Angeles, California.

== Works ==
- The Dozen from Lakerim (1899), New York, The Century Co.
- Famous American Composers (1900)
- Tommy Rot (1902), co-wrote book for musical
- The Biographical Dictionary of Musicians (1903)
- The Real New York (1904), New York, The Smart Set Publishing Company, with drawings by Henry Mayer
- Excuse Me! (1911), novel
- Mrs. Budlong's Christmas Present (1912), short story, New York & London, D Appleton & Company
- What Will People Say? (1914), novel, New York, Harper & Brothers
- The Last Rose of Summer (1914), novel, New York, Harper & Brothers
- We Can't Have Everything! (1917), novel, New York, Harper & Brothers
- In a Little Town (1917), 14 short stories, New York, Harper & brothers.
- The Cup of Fury, a Novel of Cities and Shipyards (1919), New York, Harper & brothers
- Within These Walls (1923)
- Destiny (1925), novel
- The Facts About Puritan Morals (1926)
- The Old Home Town (1925)
- George Washington: The Human Being and the Hero (1926)
- We Live but Once: (1927) novel, New York, Harper & Brothers
- Washington 1789—1933 Roosevelt, article from Cosmopolitan March (1933)
- Attorney for the People: The Story of Thomas E. Dewey (1940), Boston, Houghton Mifflin
- The Complete Detective (1950)
- The Triumphant Clay (1951), novel
- The War of the Mayan King (1952, his final novel)
- The Love Affairs of Great Musicians, Volume 1 and Volume 2

Hughes wrote and directed the silent film Reno (1923). His short story "The Mobilization of Johanna" was filmed as Johanna Enlists (1918). His "Don't Call Me Madame" was filmed as Tillie and Gus (1933). Another one of his stories was filmed as Miss Fane's Baby Is Stolen (1934).

== Filmography ==
- Tess of the Storm Country (1960)
- Lux Video Theatre (1952)
- F.B.I. Girl (1951)
- Hollywood Theatre Time (1951)
- Fingerprints Don't Lie (1951)
- The President's Mystery (1936)
- It Had to Happen (1936)
- Miss Fane's Baby Is Stolen (1934)
- Tillie and Gus (1933)
- Tess of the Storm Country (1932)
- No One Man (1932)
- The Silent Partner (1931)
- Ladies' Man (1931)
- She Goes to War (1929)
- The Girl on the Barge (1929)
- China Slaver (1929)
- The Dancing Town (1928)
- The Patent Leather Kid (1927)
- Old Ironsides (1926)
- The Winning of Barbara Worth (1926)
- Money Talks (1926)
- The Sea Beast (1926)
- Don't (1925)
- Excuse Me (1925)
- True as Steel (1924) (director and writer)
- Reno (1923) (director and writer)
- Souls for Sale (1923) (writer and director)
- Look Your Best (1923) (director and writer)
- Gimme (1923) (director and co-writer)
- Remembrance (1922) (director and writer)
- The Wall Flower (1922) (director and writer)
- Come on Over (1922)
- From the Ground Up (1921)
- Dangerous Curve Ahead (1921)
- The Old Nest (1921)
- Scratch My Back (1920)
- The Cup of Fury (1920)
- The Thirteenth Commandment (1920)
- The Unpardonable Sin (1919)
- Johanna Enlists (1918)
- We Can't Have Everything (1918)
- Empty Pockets (1918)
- The Ghosts of Yesterday (1918)
- His Mother's Boy (1917)
- The Old Folks at Home (1916)
- Gloria's Romance (1916)
- What Will People Say? (1916)
- Excuse Me (1915)
- Graft (1915)
- The Danger Signal (1915)
- The Bigger Man (1915)
- All for a Girl (1915)
- Out of the Ruins (1915)
- The Man That Might Have Been (1914)
- His Wife and His Work (1914)
- The Deaf Mute (1913)
