= Sally O'Neil =

American actress (1908–1968)

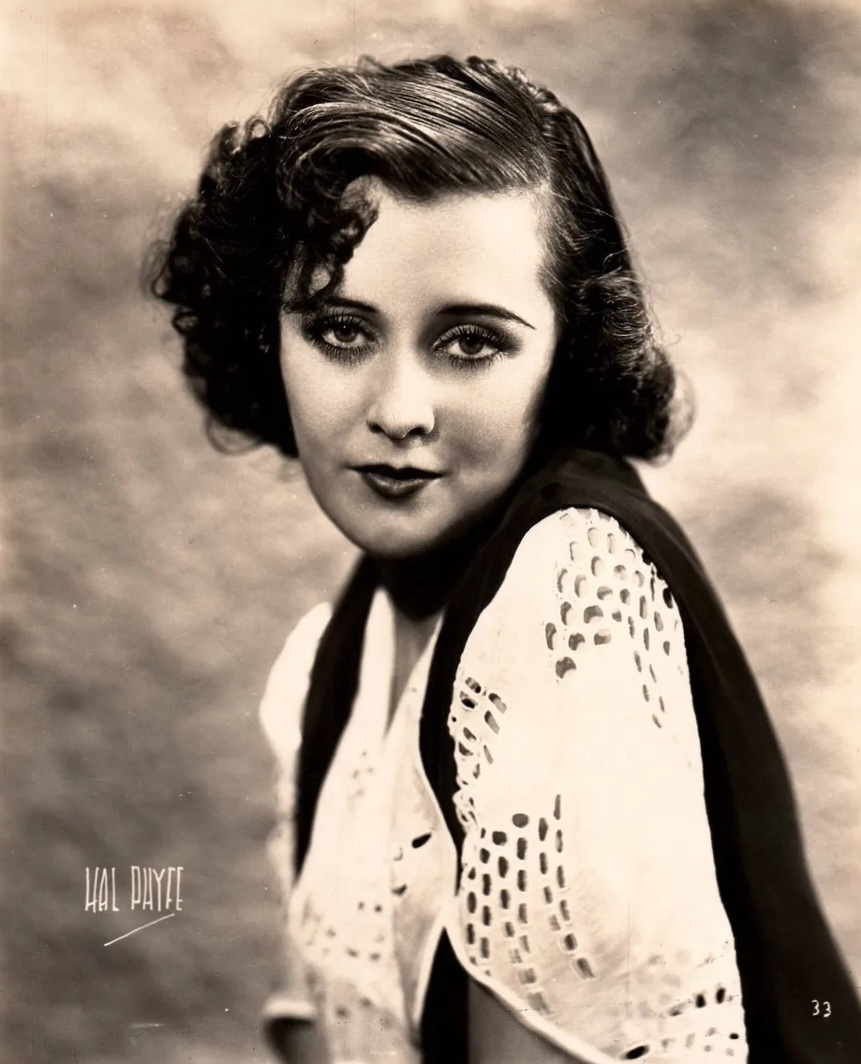
- O'Neil in circa 1926
- Born: Virginia Louise Concepta Noonan; October 23, 1908; Bayonne, New Jersey, U.S.
- Died: June 18, 1968 (aged 59); Galesburg, Illinois, U.S.
- Other name: Virginia Louise Noonan
- Occupation: Actress
- Years active: 1925–1937
- Spouse: Stewart S. Battles (m. 1953)
- Relatives: Molly O'Day (sister)

Sally O'Neil (born Virginia Louise Concepta Noonan; October 23, 1908 – June 18, 1968) was an American film actress of the 1920s. She appeared in more than 40 films, often with her name above the title.

== Early years ==
O'Neil was born Virginia Louise Concepta Noonan on October 23, 1912, or October 23, 1908, one of 11 children born to Judge Thomas Francis Patrick Noonan and his wife, Hannah Kelly, a Metropolitan Opera singer, in Bayonne, New Jersey. One of her sisters was actress Suzanne Dobson Noonan, an actress known professionally as Molly O'Day. Another sister, Isabelle, also acted in films.

== Films ==
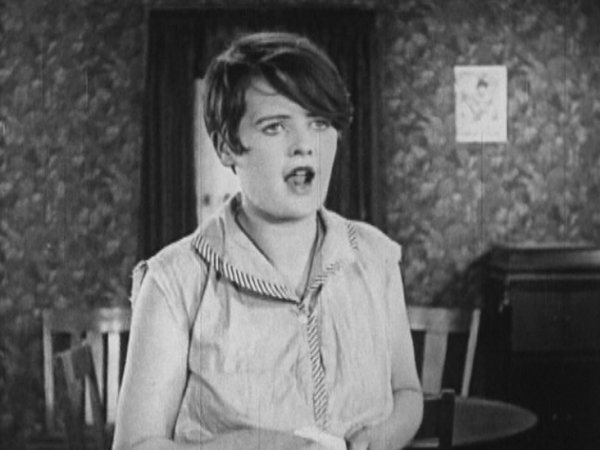
Sally O'Neil in Yes, Yes, Nanette (1925), her first film appearance.

Convent-educated, she started her career in vaudeville, billed as Chotsie Noonan and known for her petite but curvaceous frame and curly brown hair. She broke into films in 1925 at the Hal Roach studio, playing flappers or hoydenish tomboys in short-subject comedies. During her tenure with Roach she was billed as Sue O'Neil or Sue "Bugs" O'Neil.

She was teamed with Constance Bennett and Joan Crawford in the MGM film Sally, Irene and Mary (1925), directed by Edmund Goulding, which was "her big break." She appeared with Joan Crawford again as a WAMPAS Baby Star in 1926.

Her fame began to subside after silent pictures gave way to sound. Although her broad "Joisey" accent in early talkies like Jazz Heaven was unsuitable for most ingenue roles, Warner Bros. signed her to play streetwise girls in its feature films of 1929-30. After Warners released her in 1930, O'Neil freelanced at various studios. The Brat, a 1931 pre-Code film directed by John Ford, was revived at New York City's Museum of Modern Art in November 2016. A showcase for O'Neil, the movie involves a brash chorus girl's effect upon a snobbish family when their son brings her home in order to research a novel.

Her last American film was released in 1935; she traveled to England in 1937 for one final film, Kathleen Mavourneen, of interest today for a guest appearance by comedian Arthur Lucan as Old Mother Riley.

== Stage ==
Sally O'Neil appeared on Broadway in When We Are Married (1940). She continued on stage and toured with the USO until the 1950s.

== Personal life ==
In October 1953, O'Neil married businessman S.S. Battles. They divorced in 1957, but they soon remarried. She had a stepson and two stepdaughters.

== Death ==
O'Neil died of pneumonia in Galesburg, Illinois, aged 59, on June 18, 1968. (A contemporary source gave her age at death as 55.)

== Partial filmography ==
- Don't (1925)
- Sally, Irene and Mary (1925)
- Mike (1926)
- The Auction Block (1926)
- Battling Butler (1926)
- Slide, Kelly, Slide (1927)
- The Callahans and the Murphys (1927)
- Frisco Sally Levy (1927)
- Becky (1927)
- The Lovelorn (1927)
- The Battle of the Sexes (1928)
- Mad Hour (1928)
- Bachelor's Paradise (1928)
- The Floating College (1928)
- Girl on the Barge (1929)
- Broadway Scandals (1929)
- The Sophomore (1929)
- Jazz Heaven (1929)
- A Real Girl (1929)
- On with the Show! (1929)
- The Show of Shows (1929)
- Broadway Fever (1929)
- Girl of the Port (1930)
- Hold Everything (1930)
- Kathleen Mavourneen (1930)
- Murder by the Clock (1931)
- Salvation Nell (1931)
- The Brat (1931)
- By Appointment Only (1933)
- The Moth (1934)
- Beggar's Holiday (1934)
- Convention Girl (1935)
- Too Tough to Kill (1935)
- Kathleen Mavourneen (1937)
