= The Reverse of the Medal (film) =

1923 film

- Directed by: George A. Cooper
- Written by: Lionel James
- Starring: Clive Brook; John Stuart; Olaf Hytten
- Production company: Quality Plays
- Distributed by: British Gaumont
- Release date: 1922
- Country: United Kingdom
- Language: English

The Reverse of the Medal is a 1923 British silent war film directed by George A. Cooper and starring Clive Brook, John Stuart and Olaf Hytten.

== Partial cast ==
- Clive Brook - General
- John Stuart - Pilot
- Olaf Hytten - Strategist
- Bertram Terry
