= Girl on the Barge =

1929 film

The Girl on the Barge
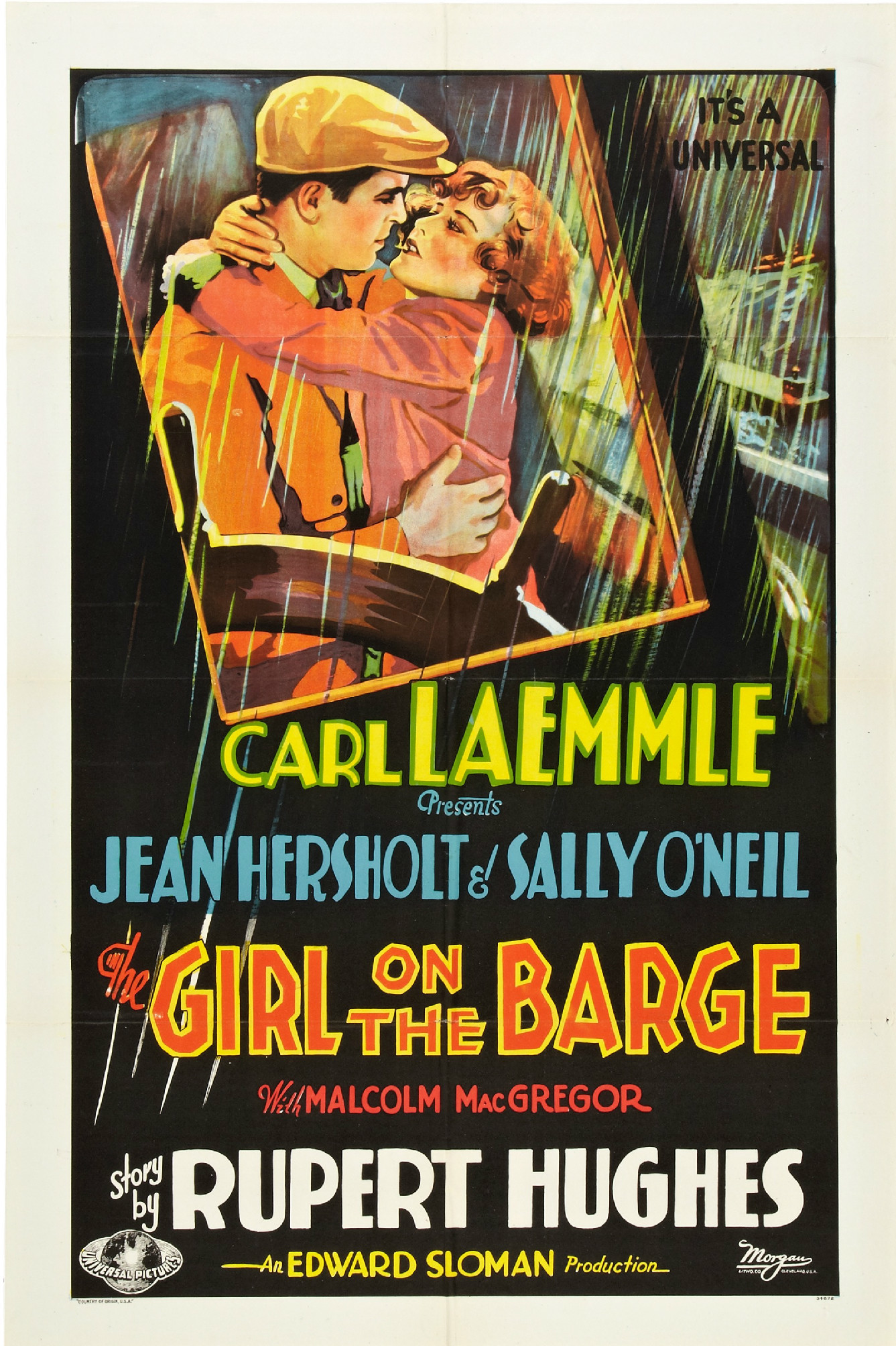
- Poster
- Directed by: Edward Sloman
- Written by: Nan Cochrane; Charles Kenyon; Tom Reed; Charles Henry Smith
- Story by: Rupert Hughes
- Starring: Jean Hersholt; Sally O'Neil
- Cinematography: Jackson Rose
- Distributed by: Universal Pictures
- Release date: February 3, 1929
- Running time: 8 reels
- Country: United States
- Languages: Sound (Part-Talkie); English Intertitles

The Girl on the Barge is a 1929 American sound part-talkie drama film directed by Edward Sloman and starring Jean Hersholt and Sally O'Neil. In addition to sequences with audible dialogue or talking sequences, the film features a synchronized musical score, singing and sound effects along with English intertitles. The sound was recorded using the Western Electric Sound System process. The film was produced and distributed by Universal Pictures. The film was filmed in Whitehall, NY. The town is looking for a copy of the movie but it appears to no longer be extant.

== Cast ==
- Jean Hersholt as McCadden
- Sally O'Neil as Erie McCadden
- Malcolm McGregor as Fogarty
- Morris Mackintosh as Huron McCadden (as Morris McIntosh)
- Nancy Kelly as Superior McCadden
- George Offerman Sr. as Ontario McCadden (as George Offerman)
- Henry West as Tug Captain
- J. Francis Robertson as Engineer

== Music ==
The film featured a theme song entitled "When You Were In Love With No One But Me" which was composed by Fred E. Ahlert, Joseph Cherniavsky and Roy Turk.

== Production ==
Although set on the Erie Canal, The Girl on the Barge was filmed on the Champlain Canal in upper New York with the film crew set up in Glens Falls, as the Erie Canal looked too modern and commercialized for the story.

== See also ==
- List of early sound feature films (1926–1929)
