= Sally, Irene and Mary (1925 film) =

1925 film

Sally, Irene, and Mary
- Theatrical poster
- Directed by: Edmund Goulding
- Written by: Edmund Goulding
- Based on: Sally, Irene and Mary by Eddie Dowling and Cyrus Woods
- Starring: Constance Bennett; Joan Crawford; Sally O'Neil; William Haines
- Cinematography: John Arnold
- Edited by: Harold Young
- Distributed by: Metro-Goldwyn-Mayer
- Release date: December 27, 1925 (United States)
- Running time: 58 minutes
- Country: United States
- Language: Silent (English intertitles)

Sally, Irene, and Mary is a 1925 American silent comedy drama film starring Constance Bennett, Sally O'Neil, and Joan Crawford. It is based on the 1922 play of the same name by Eddie Dowling and Cyrus Woods and takes a behind-the-scenes look at the romantic lives of three chorus girls and the way their preferences in men affect their lives. The play was adapted again in 1938, again titled Sally, Irene, and Mary and directed by William A. Seiter. That version stars Alice Faye, Joan Davis, and Marjorie Weaver in the title roles, and co-starred Tony Martin, Fred Allen, and Jimmy Durante.

Erté designed the stage show costumes and sets.

== Plot ==
As described in a review in a film magazine, three members of the chorus of a Broadway show, Sally, the worldly-wise chorine in search of a sugar daddy, Irene, the dreamer, sought after by one of the Broadway wolves and also by a fine young chap, and Mary, an innocent little Irish girl who almost gets singed by the Bright Lights. Sally's wealthy protector sees in Mary a new beauty and falls for her. Sally is dazzled and resents the attitude of her sweetheart who is a plumber. Irene succumbs to the lure of the Broadway wolf but, in a moment of goodness, he sends her home before it is too late. She marries the other fellow but they are killed when a train hits their honeymoon automobile. Sally's genuine grief and real love for her moneyed friend coupled with her unmasking of his real character, together with Irene's sudden death, so impress Mary that she says Broadway will never get her. Leaving the sordidness behind, she returns to her plumber sweetheart and settles down.

== Cast ==
- Constance Bennett as Sally
- Joan Crawford as Irene
- Sally O'Neil as Mary
- William Haines as Jimmy Dugan
- Douglas Gilmore as Glen Nester
- Ray Howard as Charles Greenwood
- Henry Kolker as Marcus Morton
- Douglas Gilmore as Paul
- Ray Howard as Jerry
- Kate Price as Mrs. Dugan
- Aggie Herring as Mrs. O'Brien (credited as Aggie Herrin)
- Sam De Grasse as Officer O'Dare
- Lillian Elliott as Mrs. O'Dare
- Edna Mae Cooper as Maggie
- Ben Hall as Stagehand (uncredited)
- Dixie Harkins as Minor Role (uncredited)
- Tom O'Brien as Stage Manager (uncredited)
- Walter Tennyson as Paul (uncredited)
- Wilhelm von Brincken as Party Reveler (uncredited)

== Preservation ==
A print of Sally, Irene and Mary was preserved by MGM and transferred to the George Eastman Museum Motion Picture Collection. A restoration funded under a grant from the Louis B. Mayer Foundation was completed in 2019.
