= John J. Mescall =

American cinematographer

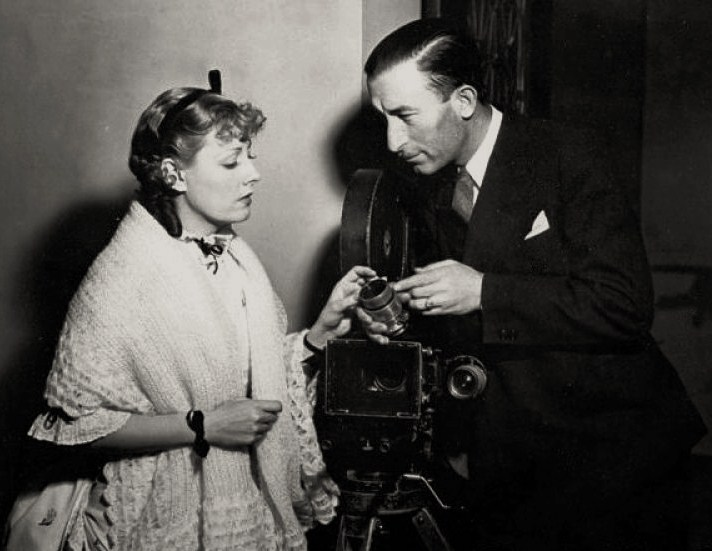
Actress Irene Dunne with cinematographer John J. Mescall on the set of Show Boat (Universal, 1936)

John J. Mescall, A.S.C. (January 10, 1899 – February 10, 1962) was an American cinematographer. He photographed such silent films as Ernst Lubitsch's The Student Prince in Old Heidelberg (1927), but he is best known for his work in the 1930s at Universal Pictures, where he often worked on the films of James Whale. Mescall was famous for his elaborate, some might say grandiose, effective camera movements, in which the camera would often track completely across or around a set, or even one performer (as it does around Paul Robeson while he sings Ol' Man River in the 1936 film version of Show Boat). He did not always use these kinds of camera movements (The Student Prince in Old Heidelberg has none), but his most famous films all have them.

== Acclaimed works ==
Bride of Frankenstein (1935) and Show Boat (1936), both directed by James Whale, are generally named among Mescall's greatest achievements in cinematography. In the former, his distinctive angles added greatly to the scene depicting the creation of the bride. Mescall also did uncredited work for Whale's The Invisible Man (1933).

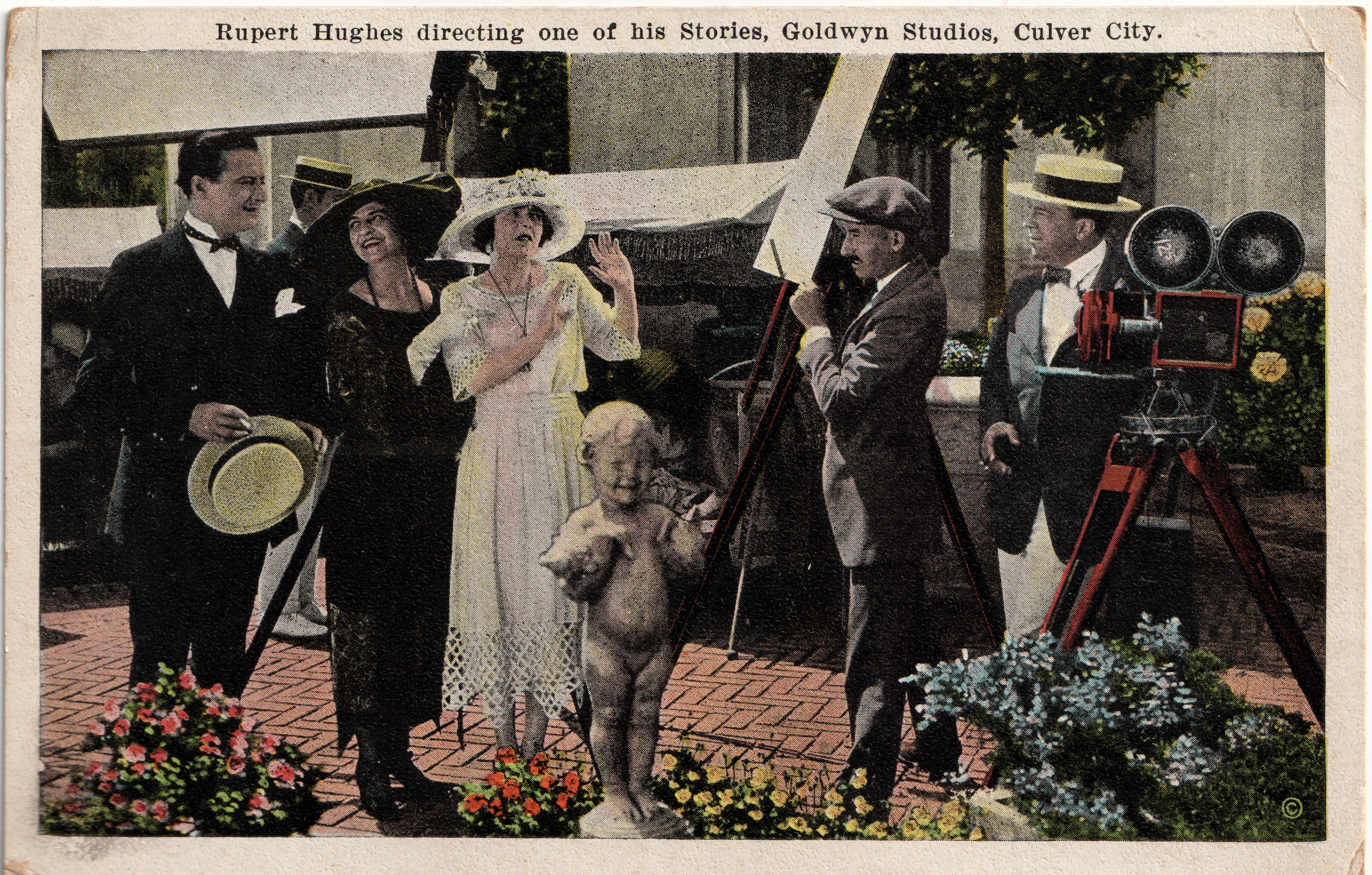
Mescall (second from right) working with director Rupert Hughes (far right)

Mescall also filmed The Road Back (1937) for Whale, an ill-fated sequel to All Quiet on the Western Front (1930). Both are based on novels by Erich Maria Remarque. Though visually compelling, The Road Back bombed at the box-office, in part due to a well-publicized editing dispute between Whale and Universal executives. The film's cast included Noah Beery Jr. and Richard Cromwell.

== Later work ==
After the 1939 "weepie" When Tomorrow Comes, starring Irene Dunne and Charles Boyer in their second film together, Mescall was limited to working in a series of forgettable films, except for the 1944 film-noir Dark Waters, starring Merle Oberon, Franchot Tone and Thomas Mitchell. He photographed two Sonja Henie films at Twentieth Century-Fox, and also did uncredited work on the 1944 film The Bridge of San Luis Rey. He received his only Academy Award nomination, oddly enough, not for his work on the Universal classics (which also included such films as Edgar G. Ulmer's The Black Cat), but for the semi-forgotten 1942 romantic comedy Take a Letter, Darling, starring Fred MacMurray and Rosalind Russell.

== Partial filmography ==
- Hold Your Horses (1921)
- All's Fair in Love (1921)
- From the Ground Up (1921)
- Watch Your Step (1922)
- The Wall Flower (1922)
- The Glorious Fool (1922)
- Gimme (1923)
- Six Days (1923)
- Three Weeks (1924)
- Satan in Sables (1925)
- Oh! What a Nurse! (1926)
- The Student Prince in Old Heidelberg (1927)
- Walking Back (1928)
- Captain Swagger (1928)
- The Leopard Lady (1928)
- The Shady Lady (1928)
- Love Over Night (1928)
- The Sophomore (1929)
- His First Command (1929)
- Sin Takes a Holiday (1930)
- Big Money (1930)
- The Black Cat (1934)
- Bride of Frankenstein (1935)
- Show Boat (1936)
- Josette (1938)
- When Tomorrow Comes (1939)
- South of Pago Pago (1940)
- Take a Letter, Darling (1942)
- Dark Waters (1944)
