= Gertrude Astor filmography =

This entry is more or less the complete filmography of actress Gertrude Astor.

== 1915-1916 ==
- Under Two Flags (1915, Short) as Venetia
- The Shadows of Suspicion (1916, Short) as May Latham
- The Janitor's Vacation (1916)

== 1917 ==
- Bombs and Banknotes (Short) as His Daughter
- The Devil's Pay Day as Hazel Davidson
- Some Specimens (Short) as Nance La Belle
- The Scarlet Crystal as Helen Forbes
- Polly Redhead as Lady Caroline
- A Startling Climax (Short) as Margy Summers
- Follow the Tracks (Short) as Gertrude - Lee's Wife
- A Darling in Buckskin (Short) as Mrs. Lancaster
- By Speshul Delivery (Short)
- Heart of Gold (Short) as Rich Mans Wife
- The Little Orphan as Emmeline Warren
- The Gray Ghost (Serial) as Lady Gwendolyn
- The Rescue as Mrs. Hendricks
- Cheyenne's Pal (Short) as Flora Belle - the Dance Hall Girl
- The Golden Heart (Short) as The Wealthy Lawyer's Wife
- The Girl Who Won Out as Mrs. Walsh
- Bondage as Eugenia Darth
- The Price of a Good Time as Mis Schyler
- The Lash of Power as Phyllis Ward
- Bucking Broadway as Gladys (uncredited)

== 1918 ==
- The Guy and the Geyser (Short)
- Vamping the Vamp (Short) as Thedeska - the Vamp
- The Great Sea Scandal (Short) as Señora Friola
- The Girl Who Wouldn't Quit as Stella Carter
- Pink Pajamas (Short) as Ethel Doe
- The Lion's Claws as Lady Mary Leighton
- Mum's the Word (Short) as Mrs. Black
- After the War
- Shot in the Dumbwaiter (Short) as Mrs. Downs
- The Brazen Beauty as Mrs. Augusta Van Ruysdael
- Maid Wanted (Short)

== 1919 ==
- The Wicked Darling as Adele Hoyt
- Tapering Fingers (Short)
- Mixed Tales (Short)
- Lay Off! (Short)
- The Wife Breakers (Short)
- What Am I Bid as Diana Newlands
- Destiny as Loraine Haswell
- Pretty Smooth as Mrs. Hanson
- Missing Husband (Short)
- Loot as Lady Gwendolyn
- The Trembling Hour as Mrs. Byrnie
- The Lion Man (Serial) as Celeste La Rue

== 1920 ==
- Occasionally Yours as Mona
- The Branding Iron as Betty Morena
- Burning Daylight as Lucille

== 1921 ==
- The Concert as Eva
- Through the Back Door as Louise Reeves
- Who Am I? as Victoria Danforth
- Her Mad Bargain as Ruth Beresford
- Lucky Carson as Madame Marinoff

== 1922 ==
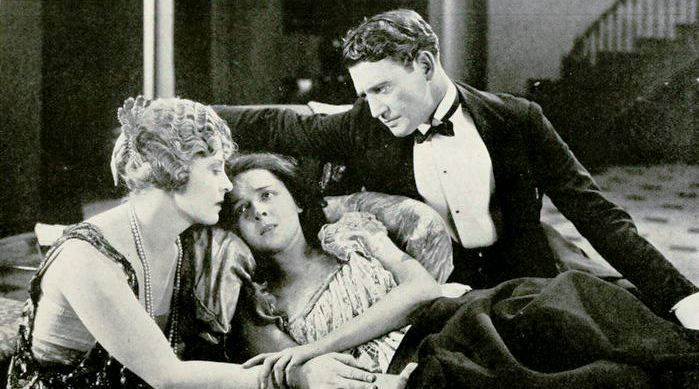
Gertrude Astor, Colleen Moore and Richard Dix filming The Wall Flower (1922)

- Seeing's Believing as Aunt Sue
- Beyond the Rocks as Morella Winmarleigh
- The Wall Flower as Pamela Shiel
- Hurricane's Gal as Phyllis Fairfield
- Skin Deep as Mrs. Carlson
- Lorna Doone as Countess of Brandir (uncredited)
- The Impossible Mrs. Bellew as Alice Granville
- The Kentucky Derby as Helen Gordon
- You Never Know as Miriam Folansbee
- The Ninety and Nine as Kate Van Dyke

== 1923 ==
- Alice Adams as Mildred Palmer
- The Ne'er-Do-Well as Edith Cortlandt
- Rupert of Hentzau as Paula
- Hollywood as Herself (Cameo)
- The Six-Fifty as Christine Palmer
- Flaming Youth as Annie
- The Wanters as Mrs. Van Pelt

== 1924 ==
- Secrets as Mrs. Manwaring
- Broadway or Bust as Mrs. Dean Smythe
- Daring Love as Music
- Fight and Win
- The Torrent as The Cast-Off
- All's Swell on the Ocean (Short)
- The Silent Watcher as Mrs. Steele
- The Ridin' Kid from Powder River as 'Kansas' Lou
- Robes of Sin as Adelaide Thomas

== 1925 ==
- Easy Money as Ellen Hale
- The Reckless Sex as Lucile Dupré
- Folly of Youth as Evelyn Cartwright
- The Charmer as Bertha Sedgwick
- The Verdict as Mrs. Ronsard
- Pursued as Madame La Grande
- Kentucky Pride as Mrs. Beaumont
- The Wife Who Wasn't Wanted as Greta
- Satan in Sables as Dolores Sierra
- Stage Struck as Lillian Lyons
- Laughing Ladies (Short) as The Married Man's Wife
- Borrowed Finery as Maisie
- The Ship of Souls as Doris Barnes

== 1926 ==
- Behind the Front as French barmaid
- Dizzy Daddies (Short) as A Former Flame
- Wife Tamers (Short) as Mrs. Barry
- Kiki as Paulette Mascar
- The Boy Friend as Mrs. White
- Don Juan's Three Nights as Baroness von Minden
- The Strong Man as 'Lily' of Broadway
- Dame Chance as Nina Carrington
- The Old Soak as Sylvia De Costa
- Tell 'Em Nothing (Short) as Mrs. Gladstone
- The Country Beyond as Mrs. Andrews
- Sin Cargo as Mary Wickham
- The Cheerful Fraud as Rose

== 1927 ==
- Lightning Lariats as Girl
- The Taxi Dancer as Kitty Lane
- The Cat and the Canary as Cecily
- Shanghaied as Bessie
- Pretty Clothes as Rose Dunbar
- The Irresistible Lover as Dolly Carleton
- Uncle Tom's Cabin as Mrs. St. Clare (uncredited)
- The Small Bachelor as Fanny
- Ginsberg the Great as Sappho
- Oh, What a Man! (Short) as The Bandit

== 1928 ==
- The Cohens and the Kellys in Paris as Paulette
- Rose-Marie as Wanda
- The Family Group (Short)
- Five and Ten Cent Annie as Blonde
- Hit of the Show as Trece
- The Butter and Egg Man as Fanny Lehman
- Stocks and Blondes as Goldie
- The Naughty Duchess as Ninon
- A Woman of Affairs as Party Guest (uncredited)
- Chasing Husbands (Short)

== 1929 ==
- Synthetic Sin as Sheila Kelly
- The Fatal Warning
- Two Weeks Off as Agnes
- The Fall of Eve as Mrs. Ford
- Twin Beds as Mrs. Solari
- Frozen Justice as Moosehide Kate
- Untamed as Mrs. Mason

== 1930 ==
- Be Yourself as Lillian
- Dames Ahoy! as The Blonde
- Live and Learn (Short)
- The Boss's Orders (Short)
- The Doctor's Wife (Short)
- Over the Radio (Short)

== 1931 ==
- Finger Prints (Serial) as Jane Madden
- Twisted Tales (Short)
- Hell Bound as Rosie
- Poker Widows (Short) as Mrs. Thomas Regan
- Come Clean (Short) as Mrs. Hardy
- Wedding Belles (Short)

== 1932 ==
- Running Hollywood (Short) as Herself
- In Walked Charley (Short) as Gertrude Henderson, Jackie's Mother
- They Never Come Back as Kate
- While Paris Sleeps (uncredited)
- High Hats and Low Brows (Short) as Mrs. Billingsgate
- Western Limited as Mrs. Winters
- Flaming Gold as Escort Service Madam (uncredited)
- Hesitating Love (Short)
- Frisco Jenny as Miss Beulah (uncredited)
- Zwei Ritter ohne Furcht und Tadel as 1 Short

== 1933 ==
- Wine, Women and Song as Jennie Tilson
- The Plumber and the Lady (Short) as Mrs. Otto Mauser
- I Have Lived as Harriet Naisson
- Ship of Wanted Men as Vera
- Crook's Tour (Short) as Mrs. Dorigan
- Carnival Lady as Zandra, Fortune Teller

== 1934 ==
- Guilty Parents as Marie
- I'll Take Vanilla (Short) as Junior's Mother (uncredited)
- Now I'll Tell as Freddie's wife (scenes deleted)
- Washee Ironee (Short) as Woman Hit in Back with Ice Cream
- Tailspin Tommy (Serial) as Fake Office Nurse / Taggart's Date - Chs. 7, 9
- The Chases of Pimple Street (Short) as Herself, Lucas' Fiancée (uncredited)
- The Mighty Barnum as Woman in Museum (uncredited)
- Sweet Adeline in a minor role (uncredited)

== 1935 ==
- Northern Frontier as Mae
- The Drunkard as Peggy
- Four Hours to Kill! as Little Girl's Mother
- Border Brigands as Big Six -Saloon Girl
- Okay Toots!
- No More Ladies as Nightclub Extra (uncredited)
- Honeymoon Limited as Lady Devonshire
- Dante's Inferno as Concessionaire's Wife (uncredited)
- Broadway Melody of 1936 as Actress in Bob Gordon's Waiting Room (uncredited)
- Here Comes the Band in a minor role (uncredited)
- Cappy Ricks Returns as Speaker (uncredited)
- It's in the Air (uncredited)
- Bad Boy in a minor role (uncredited)
- Manhattan Monkey Business (Short) as Gwendolyn, Surly Patron's Blonde Girlfriend (uncredited)
- I Don't Remember (Short) as Sophie Glick (uncredited)

== 1936 ==
- The Mysterious Avenger as Townswoman (uncredited)
- The Milky Way as Party Guest (uncredited)
- The Great Ziegfeld as Sassy Blonde Anna Held Audience Member (uncredited)
- San Francisco as Drunk's Girl (uncredited)
- His Brother's Wife in a minor role (uncredited)
- Postal Inspector as Woman with Drumsticks (uncredited)
- Straight from the Shoulder (uncredited)
- Our Relations as Pirate's Club Customer (uncredited)
- The Magnificent Brute as Townswoman (uncredited)
- Empty Saddles as Eloise Hayes
- Great Guy as Party Guest (uncredited)

== 1937 ==
- Rich Relations
- Easy Living as Saleswoman (uncredited)
- Souls at Sea as Barmaid (uncredited)
- The Man Who Cried Wolf as Landlady (uncredited)
- All Over Town as Mamie
- Wells Fargo as Pioneer Woman (uncredited)

== 1938 ==
- The Big Broadcast of 1938 as Woman (uncredited)
- Tassels in the Air (Short) as Louella Pindell (uncredited)

== 1939 ==
- The Women as Mud Bath Nurse (uncredited)
- Dust Be My Destiny as Dame (uncredited)
- $1000 a Touchdown as McGlen Wife (uncredited)
- The Llano Kid as Saloon Hostess (uncredited)

== 1940 ==
- The Doctor Takes a Wife as Extra (uncredited)
- Misbehaving Husbands as Gossiping Friend

== 1941 ==
- Hold Back the Dawn as Young Woman in Bar (uncredited)
- How Green Was My Valley in a bit part (uncredited)
- The Wolf Man (1941) as Townswoman (uncredited)

== 1942 ==
- Lady for a Night as Woman (uncredited)
- Frisco Lil as Blackjack Kibitzer (uncredited)
- Sleepytime Gal as Wife (uncredited)
- Reap the Wild Wind as Ball Guest (uncredited)
- Rings on Her Fingers as Tall Woman Exiting Ladies Lounge (uncredited)
- Moontide as Woman (uncredited)
- Rough on Rents (Short) as Miss Finch, Landlady
- Red River Robin Hood as Paul's Wife (uncredited)
- Lost Canyon as Mrs. Anson (uncredited)

== 1943 ==
- Idaho as Party Guest (uncredited)
- The Avenging Rider as Martha (uncredited)
- Petticoat Larceny as Woman on Street (uncredited)
- The Kansan as Blonde Townswoman (uncredited)

== 1944 ==
- Weird Woman as Party Guest (uncredited)
- The Scarlet Claw as Lady Lillian Gentry Penrose (uncredited)
- The Climax as Woman in Audience Behind Franz (uncredited)
- Lights of Old Santa Fe as Medley Market Show Spectator (uncredited)
- Can't Help Singing as Pioneer Woman - Warren's Mother (uncredited)

== 1945 ==
- Wonder Man as Assistant District Attorney's Wife (uncredited)
- Guest Wife as Outraged Woman in Night Club (uncredited)
- Swingin' on a Rainbow as Bit (uncredited)
- Girls of the Big House as Railroad Matron (uncredited)
- Allotment Wives as Marlyn (uncredited)
- Man Alive as Madam Zorada (uncredited)
- An Angel Comes to Brooklyn as Eva Tanguay (uncredited)
- Dick Tracy as Woman (uncredited)

== 1946 ==
- Dragonwyck as Nurse (uncredited)
- Crack-Up as Nagging Wife on Train (uncredited)
- Sister Kenny as Doctor (uncredited)

== 1947 ==
- Monsieur Verdoux as Garden Party Guest (uncredited)
- Calcutta as Nightclub Patron (uncredited)
- Fun on a Week-End as Party Guest (uncredited)

== 1948 ==
- Sitting Pretty as Townswoman (uncredited)
- Here Comes Trouble as Woman with Dog (uncredited)
- Jinx Money as Bank Customer (uncredited)
- Music Man as Mrs. Larkin
- Joe Palooka in Winner Take All as Mrs. Howard
- My Dear Secretary as Miss Gee (uncredited)
- 3 Godfathers as Saloon Girl (uncredited)

== 1949 ==
- Impact as Note-Taking Reporter in Courtroom (uncredited)
- The Beautiful Blonde from Bashful Bend as Towns Woman (uncredited)
- Jolson Sings Again (uncredited)
- Down Dakota Way as Bus Passenger (uncredited)
- Mary Ryan, Detective as Party Guest (uncredited)
- The Story of Seabiscuit as Oscar's Wife (uncredited)

== 1950 ==
- The File on Thelma Jordon as Juror (uncredited)
- Montana as Woman (uncredited)
- Woman in Hiding as Woman in Drugstore (uncredited)
- Father Makes Good as Librarian (uncredited)
- Caged as Inmate (uncredited)
- Sunset Boulevard as Courtier (uncredited)
- Bunco Squad as Club Patron (uncredited)
- All About Eve as Sarah Siddons Awards Guest (uncredited)
- Again... Pioneers as Mrs. Irma Jans
- Harvey as Party Guest (uncredited)
- Sierra Passage as Show Spectator (uncredited)

== 1951 ==
- The Redhead and the Cowboy as Goldie (uncredited)
- A Place in the Sun in a bit part (uncredited)
- Apache Drums as Townswoman (uncredited)
- Thunder on the Hill as Village Woman (uncredited)
- Chain of Circumstance as Mrs. Sykes (uncredited)
- When Worlds Collide as Traveler (uncredited)
- Havana Rose as Matron (uncredited)
- Disc Jockey as Elderly Woman (uncredited)
- The Barefoot Mailman as Townswoman (uncredited)
- Crazy Over Horses as Elderly Woman (uncredited)
- Elopement as Mother (uncredited)

== 1952 ==
- The Old West as Townswoman (uncredited)
- Scandal Sheet as Neighbor (uncredited)
- Jet Job as Dance Partner
- Paula as Mrs. Brown (uncredited)
- The Rose Bowl Story in a minor role (uncredited)
- I Love Lucy (TV Series, ep. "Ricky Loses His Voice") as Chorus Girl

== 1953 ==
- Angel Face as Matron (uncredited)
- Scared Stiff as Wife of Man with Spaghetti on Head (uncredited)
- Loose in London as Lady Hightower (uncredited)
- Roar of the Crowd as Miss Adams (uncredited)
- The Beast from 20,000 Fathoms as Screaming Woman (uncredited)

== 1954 ==
- A Star Is Born as Racetrack Spectator (uncredited)
- Deep in My Heart as 'Old Ironsides' - Dorothy's Nurse (uncredited)

== 1955 ==
- Untamed as Ball Guest (uncredited)
- Daddy Long Legs as Art Gallery Patron (uncredited)
- Wichita as Saloon Girl (uncredited)
- How to Be Very, Very Popular (uncredited)
- The Virgin Queen as Lady-in-Waiting - 2nd Group (uncredited)
- Artists and Models (uncredited)
- At Gunpoint as Townswoman (uncredited)

== 1956 ==
- Lux Video Theatre (TV Series, ep. "The Night of January Sixteenth") as Member of the Jury
- The Searchers as Wedding Guest (uncredited)
- The Boss as Woman at Dedication (uncredited)
- Around the World in 80 Days as Extra (uncredited)
- Everything But the Truth in a bit part (uncredited)
- Westward Ho, the Wagons! as Wagon Woman (uncredited)

== 1957 ==
- The Oklahoman as Townswoman Gossip (uncredited)
- Broken Arrow (TV Series, ep. "Attack on Fort Grant") as Older Woman

== 1959 ==
- Rescue 8 (TV Series, ep. "Walking Death") as Nurse
- The Horse Soldiers as Townswoman (uncredited)
- The Best of Everything as Leading Woman in Play (uncredited)

== 1961 ==
- All in a Night's Work as Shopper (uncredited)
- Two Rode Together as Mrs. Wringle (uncredited)
- Twenty Plus Two as Julia Joliet (uncredited)
- The Devil's Hand as The Elderly Cultist
- The Adventures of Ozzie & Harriet (TV Series, ep. "The Trading Stamps") as Matron

== 1962 ==
- Four Horsemen of the Apocalypse as Woman at Auction / Restaurant Patron (uncredited)
- The Man Who Shot Liberty Valance as Townswoman (uncredited)

== 1964 ==
- The New Phil Silvers Show (TV Series, ep. "Auntie Up") as Ingrid
- The Unsinkable Molly Brown as Denver Party Guest (uncredited)

== 1965 ==
- The Sound of Music as Party Guest (uncredited)

== 1966 ==
- My Mother the Car (TV Series, ep. "The Incredible Shrinking Car") as Old Lady (final appearance)
