= The Kentucky Derby (1922 film) =

1922 film

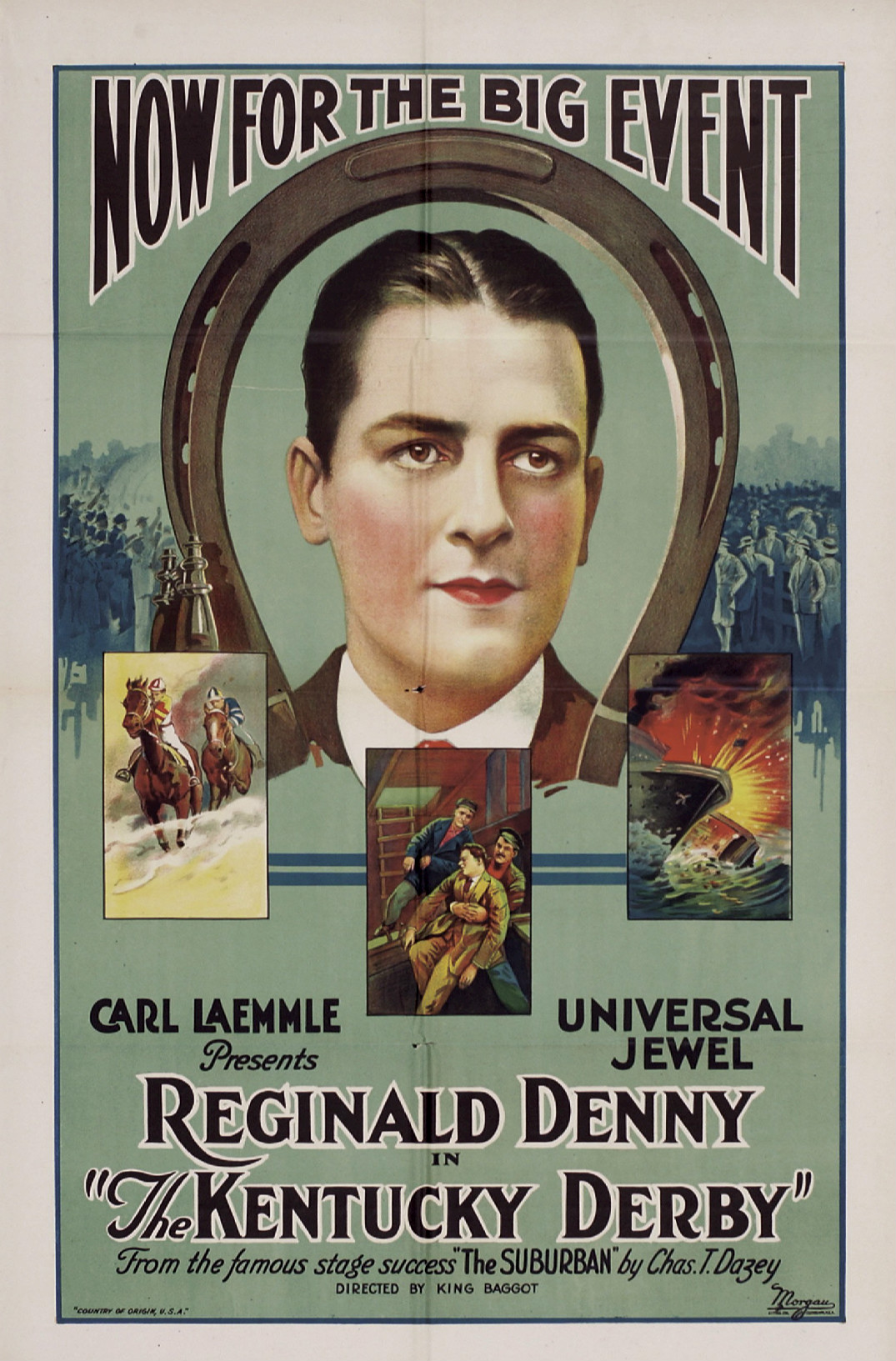
- Film poster
- Directed by: King Baggot
- Produced by: Carl Laemmle
- Starring: Reginald Denny
- Cinematography: Victor Milner
- Distributed by: Universal Film Manufacturing Company
- Release dates: October 1922 (Chicago prem.); December 4, 1922 (USA)
- Running time: 6 reels
- Country: United States
- Language: Silent (English intertitles)

The Kentucky Derby is a 1922 American silent adventure film directed by King Baggot and starring Reginald Denny. It is based on a Broadway play The Suburban by Charles T. Dazey. It was produced and distributed by Universal Film Manufacturing Company. Denny's first starring feature-length movie.

The film survives today.

== Cast ==
- Reginald Denny as Donald Gordon
- Lillian Rich as Alice Brown
- Emmett King as Col. Moncrief Gordon
- Walter McGrail as Ralph Gordon
- Gertrude Astor as Helen Gordon
- Lionel Belmore as Col. Rome Woolrich
- Kingsley Benedict as Joe
- Bert Woodruff as Rance Newcombe
- Bert Tracy as Topper Tom
- Harry Carter as Bob Thurston
- Wilfred Lucas as Capt. Wolff
- Pat Harmon as Jensen
- Anna Dodge as Mrs. Clancy (* billed as Anna Hernandez)
- Verne Winter as Timmy Clancy

== See also ==
- List of films about horses
- List of films about horse racing
- Gertrude Astor filmography
