= Synthetic Sin =

1929 film directed by William A. Seiter

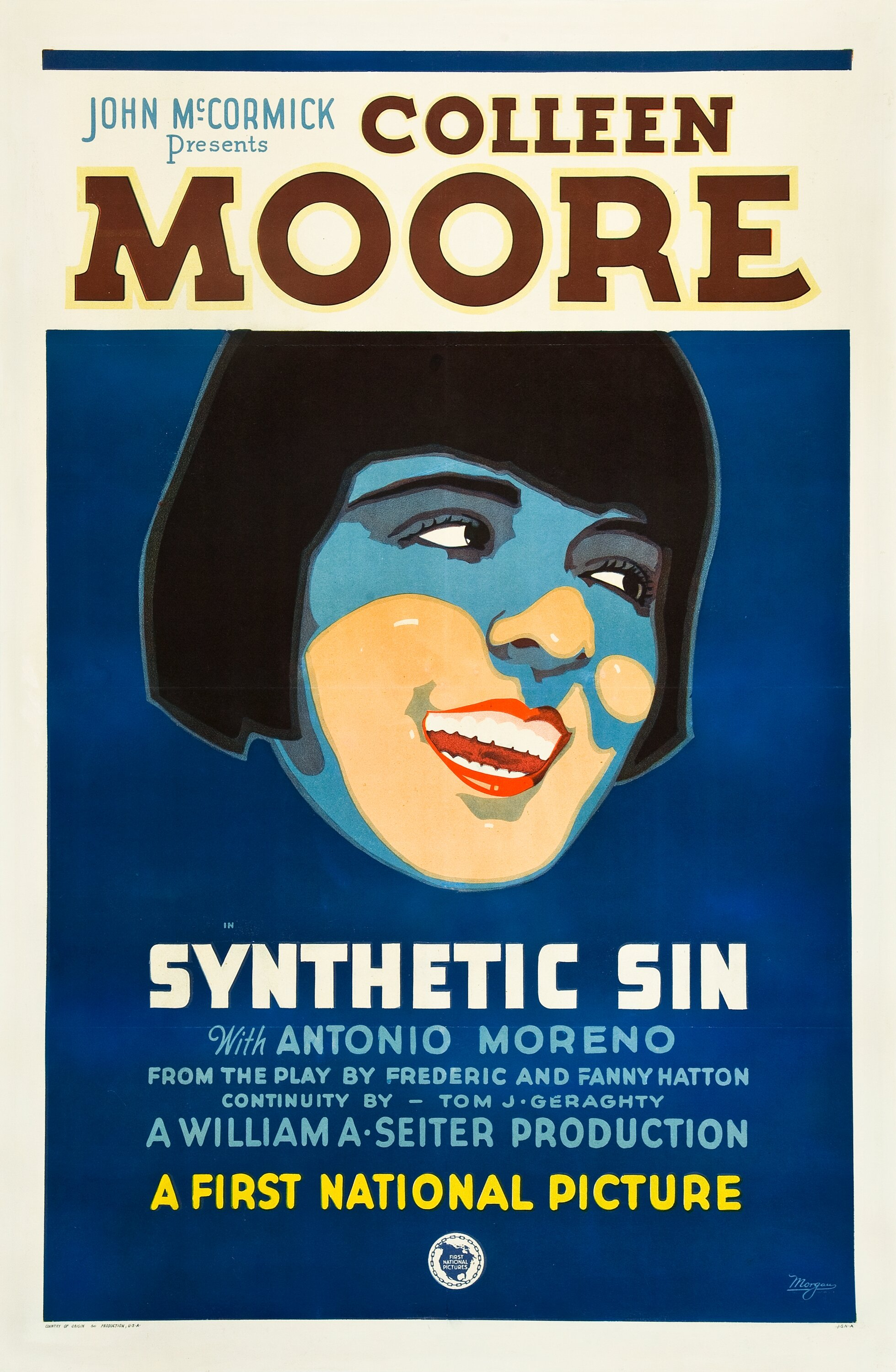
- Theatrical release poster
- Directed by: William A. Seiter
- Written by: Thomas J. Geraghty; Tom Reed
- Based on: Synthetic Sin by Fanny Hatton and Frederic Hatton
- Produced by: John McCormick
- Starring: Colleen Moore; Antonio Moreno; Edythe Chapman
- Cinematography: Sidney Hickox
- Edited by: Alexander Hall
- Music by: Nathaniel Shilkret
- Production company: First National Pictures
- Distributed by: Warner Bros. Pictures
- Release date: January 6, 1929
- Running time: 72 minutes
- Country: United States
- Languages: Sound (Synchronized) (English intertitles)

Synthetic Sin is a 1929 American Synchronized sound comedy film directed by William A. Seiter, based on a play of the same name. While the film has no audible dialog, it was released with a synchronized musical score with sound effects using both the sound-on-disc and sound-on-film process. It was released by Warner Bros. Pictures and was recorded using the Vitaphone sound system. Only the soundtrack disc for the last reel is known to survive.

== Plot ==
When Donald Anthony returns to his hometown of Magnolia Gap, Virginia, after seven years, the Gap Gazette proudly proclaims him as "America's foremost playwright". His arrival causes a stir—especially among the Fairfax family.

Waiting at the station are Margery Fairfax, whose interest in Donald is clearly matrimonial; her cousin, the lively and stage-struck flapper Betty Fairfax; and the ever-scheming Mrs. Fairfax. At dinner that evening, Donald is quickly bored—until Betty livens things up with her playful impersonations of famous characters.

The following night at a musical evening hosted by Mrs. Fairfax, Margery performs a stiff classical dance. Unbeknownst to the crowd, Betty burlesques the routine from behind a curtain—appearing in blackface for comic effect. Donald, charmed by her natural flair, later proposes and promises her the lead in his next Broadway play.

But the production fails—Betty lacks the worldliness to convincingly portray the play's jaded heroine. Donald tells her she is too naïve, too untouched by life. Determined to gain "experience", Betty heads to New York and consults Sheila Kelly, a seasoned actress from the cast. Betty rents a flat in a boarding house where she is soon surrounded by a colorful crowd: a group of gangsters and their girlfriends, including Brandy Mulane, Frank, Tony, and others.

Don arrives and tries to pull Betty out of her new crowd, but the gangsters physically throw him out. In the lobby, he runs into Sheila, who explains that Betty has only just arrived—hardly enough time to acquire "life experience". Don then decides to teach Betty a lesson by staging a fake police raid.

Betty, however, overhears his plan and believes that whatever happens next must be another one of Don's schemes. When a real armed gangster appears on her balcony, Betty stays cool, assuming it's staged. But a brutal fight breaks out and Brandy Mulane is killed—only then does Betty realize the situation is deadly real.

Don rushes upstairs to protect her. Betty throws her arms around him, but another gangster bursts in. Don grabs the dead man's gun and threatens the intruder just as the police arrive. Mistaking Don for the killer, the police handcuff him and Betty. Only the boarding house manager and Don's social standing save them from serious trouble.

Later, Don opens a new play in New York—Waverly's Woman—with Betty by his side.

"I've got an idea for a new play," Don whispers, "with a leading role perfect for you."

Betty smiles. "The part I can best play," she replies, "is the wife of Donald Anthony—forever."

== Cast ==
- Colleen Moore as Betty Fairfax
- Antonio Moreno as Donald Anthony
- Edythe Chapman as Mrs. Fairfax
- Kathryn McGuire as Margery Fairfax
- Gertrude Howard as Cassie
- Gertrude Astor as Sheila Kelly
- Ray Turner as Sam (credited as Raymond Turner)
- Montagu Love as Brandy Mulane
- Ben Hendricks Jr. as Frank
- Philip Sleeman as Tony (credited as Phil Sleeman)
- Jack Byron as Tony's Henchman
- Fred Warren as Joe
- Jay Eaton as Member of Frank's Gang
- Stanley Blystone as Member of Frank's Gang
- Art Rowlands as Member of Frank's Gang
- Dick Gordon as Member of Frank's Gang
- Julanne Johnston as Member of Frank's Gang
- Hazel Howell as Member of Frank's Gang

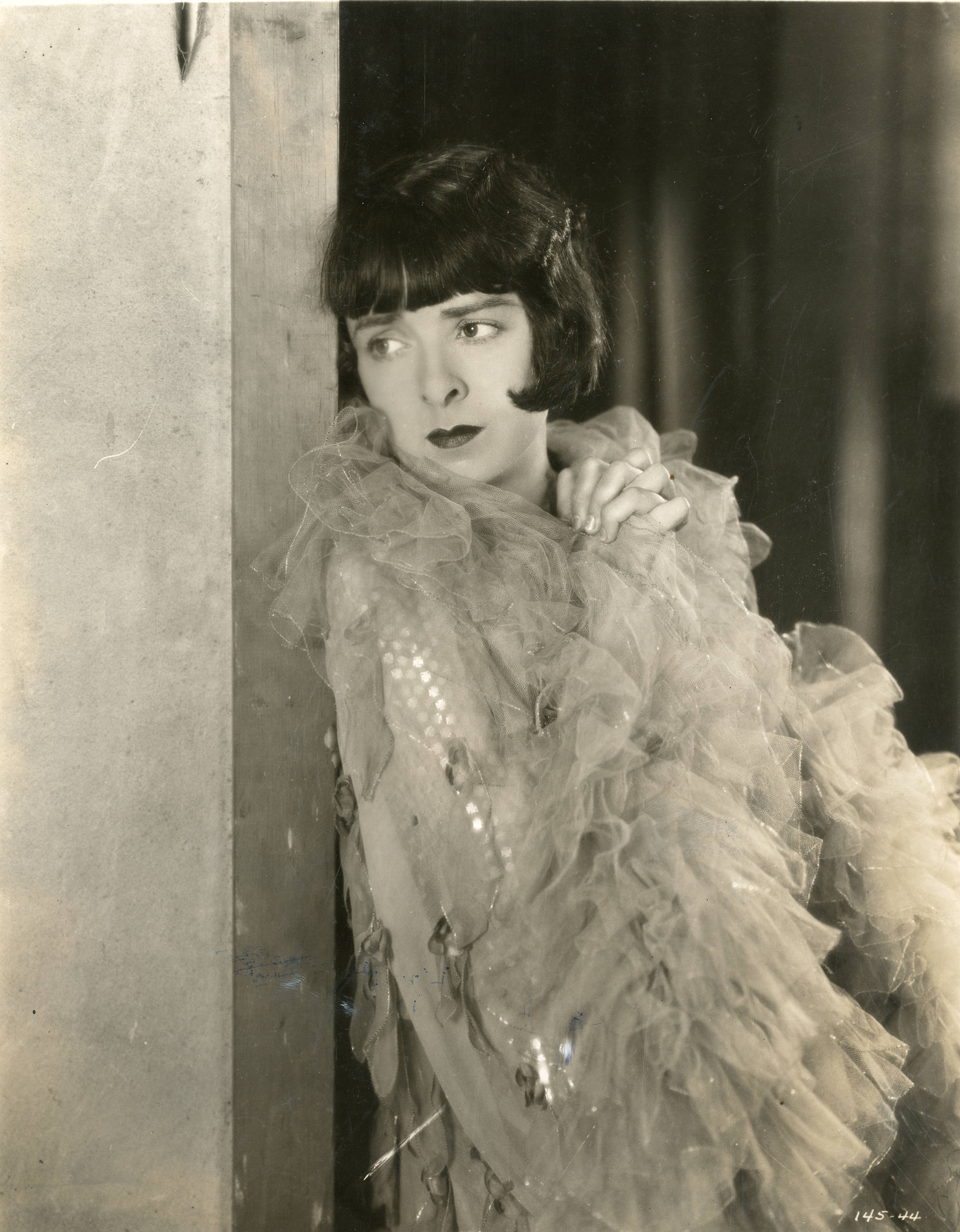
Moore

== Music ==
The film featured a theme song entitled "Betty" which was composed by Nathaniel Shilkret and Harold Christy.

== Preservation status ==
A copy survives at the Cineteca Italiana archive in Milan. Previously it was considered to be a lost film. Colleen Moore had deposited copies of several of her movies with the Museum of Modern Art (MOMA), but it allowed the films to decompose before they could be restored.

== See also ==
- List of early sound feature films (1926–1929)
- List of early Warner Bros. sound and talking features
- Gertrude Astor filmography
