= The Ridin' Kid from Powder River =

1924 film directed by Edward Sedgwick

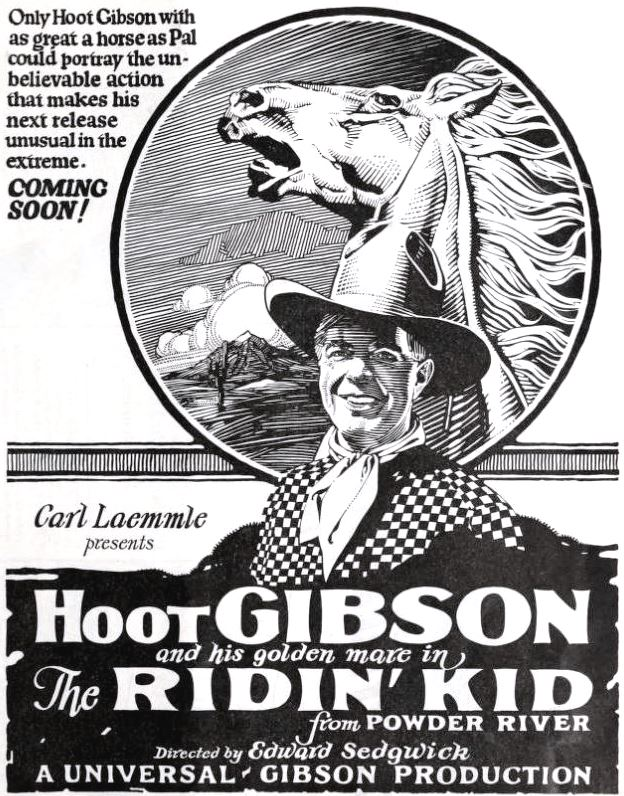
- Advertisement
- Directed by: Edward Sedgwick
- Written by: E. Richard Schayer; Raymond L. Schrock; Rex Taylor; Leroy Armstrong
- Based on: The Ridin' Kid from Powder River by Henry Herbert Knibbs
- Produced by: Carl Laemmle
- Starring: Hoot Gibson
- Cinematography: Virgil Miller
- Distributed by: Universal Pictures
- Release date: November 30, 1924
- Running time: 1 hour
- Country: United States
- Languages: Silent; English intertitles

The Ridin' Kid from Powder River is a 1924 American silent Western film directed by Edward Sedgwick and starring Hoot Gibson. It was based on a novel by Henry Herbert Knibbs and produced and distributed by Universal Pictures.

== Plot ==
As described in a film magazine, Bud Watkins (House), a lad of ten years who does not know who his parents are, has become the abused, half-starved property of an itinerant horse trader whose territory is the cattle country of Arizona—as a trader—and of Nevada as a horse thief. It is the period when farmers are contesting against the cattleman for the open range, and by fortuitous chance the lad becomes the ward of a farmer who is killed a few years later by cattlemen. The lad (Gibson) vows to avenge his death and soon becomes known throughout the country as "The Rambler" because he is always riding across country searching for the murderers. Through hazardous adventure he becomes associated with some desperate characters who have retained some spark of humanity, and in the leader this is represented by his love for his beautiful daughter (Hulette), just merging into womanhood. Escaping many traps by shooting his way to safety, "The Rambler" finally keeps his vow, comes to happiness—and then his country calls him to oppose the armies of Spain.

== Cast ==
- Hoot Gibson as Bud Watkins
- Gladys Hulette as 'Miss'
- Gertrude Astor as 'Kansas' Lou
- Tully Marshall as The Spider
- Walter Long as Steve Lanning
- Sid Jordan as 'Buzzard' Davis
- William Steele as 'Lightin' Bill Smith
- Howard Truesdale as 'Pop' Watkins
- Frank Rice as Cal Huxley
- Nelson McDowell as Luke Meggary
- Fred Humes as The Scorpion
- Bowditch M. Turner as Manuel
- Newton House as Bud Watkins aged 10

== Preservation status ==
An incomplete print of The Ridin' Kid from Powder River consisting of 2 reels is preserved in the George Eastman Museum in Rochester.

== See also ==
- Hoot Gibson filmography
- Gertrude Astor filmography
