= The Boy Friend (1926 film) =

1926 film by Monta Bell

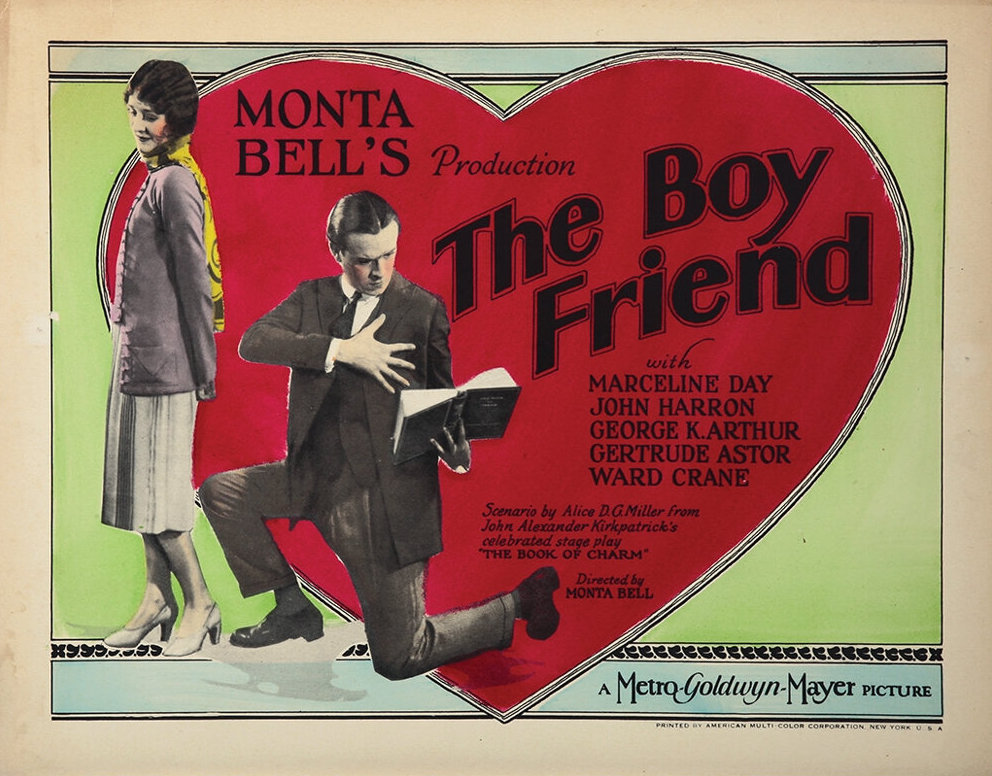
- Lobby card for the film
- Directed by: Monta Bell
- Written by: Alice D. G. Miller (adaptation)
- Based on: The Book of Charm; 1925 play by John Alexander Kirkpatrick
- Starring: Marceline Day; John Harron; Gwen Lee
- Cinematography: Henry Sharp
- Edited by: Blanche Sewell
- Distributed by: Metro-Goldwyn-Mayer
- Release date: August 14, 1926 (United States)
- Running time: 65 mins.
- Country: United States
- Language: Silent (English intertitles)

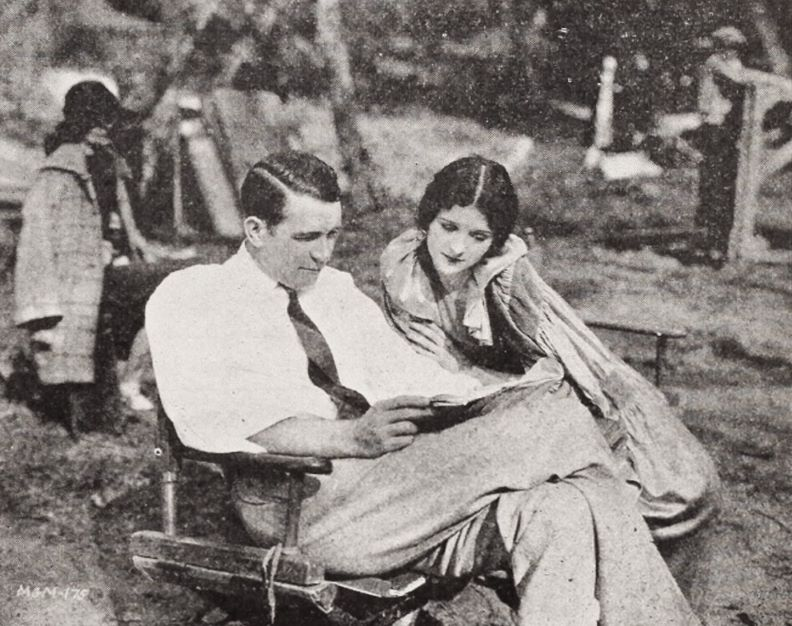
Monta Bell and Marceline Day reviewing the script

The Boy Friend is a lost 1926 American silent romantic comedy film directed by Monta Bell. Based on the play The Book of Charm by John Alexander Kirkpatrick, the film starred Marceline Day and John Harron. This film also marked the film debut of character actress Elizabeth Patterson.

== Plot ==
Comedy about a small-town girl unhappy with her family, and a boy trying to please her by throwing a big party.

== Cast ==
- Marceline Day as Ida May Harper
- John Harron as Joe Pond
- George K. Arthur as Book Agent
- Ward Crane as Lester White
- Gertrude Astor as Mrs. White
- Otto Hoffman as Mr. Harper
- Maidel Turner as Mrs. Wilson
- Gwen Lee as Pettie Wilson
- Elizabeth Patterson as Mrs. Harper

== See also ==
- Gertrude Astor filmography
- The Boy Friend (1971 film)
