= The Charmer (1925 film) =

1925 film by Sidney Olcott

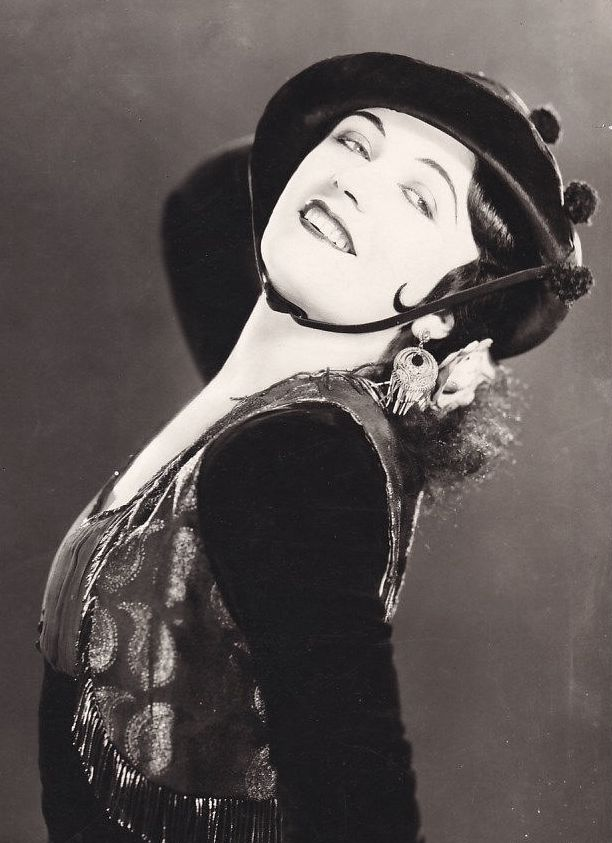
- Still with Negri
- Directed by: Sidney Olcott
- Written by: Sada Cowan
- Produced by: Jesse L. Lasky; Adolph Zukor; John Lynch; Famous Players–Lasky
- Starring: Pola Negri; Robert Frazer
- Cinematography: James Wong Howe
- Edited by: Patricia Rooney
- Distributed by: Paramount Pictures
- Release date: April 19, 1925
- Running time: 6 reels
- Country: United States
- Language: Silent (English intertitles)

The Charmer is a 1925 American silent drama film produced by Famous Players–Lasky and distributed by Paramount. It was directed by Sidney Olcott with Pola Negri in the leading role.

== Plot ==
As described in a film magazine review, a Spanish dancer is brought to the United States after meeting American tourists. Her interest is centered on a wealthy American and his chauffeur. She becomes successful in New York City and the wealthy tourists seek her. She learns that the man is a bounder, but she is involved in a romance with the chauffeur.

== Cast ==
- Pola Negri as Mariposa
- Wallace MacDonald as Ralph Bayne
- Robert Frazer as Dan Murray
- Trixie Friganza as Mama
- Cesare Gravina as Señor Sprott
- Gertrude Astor as Bertha Sedgwick
- Edwards Davis as Mr. Sedgwick
- Mathilde Brundage as Mrs. Bayne
- Dan Crimmins as The Lawyer

== Preservation ==
With no prints of The Charmer located in any film archives, it is a lost film.

== See also ==
- Gertrude Astor filmography
