= After the Storm (1928 film) =

1928 film directed by George B. Seitz

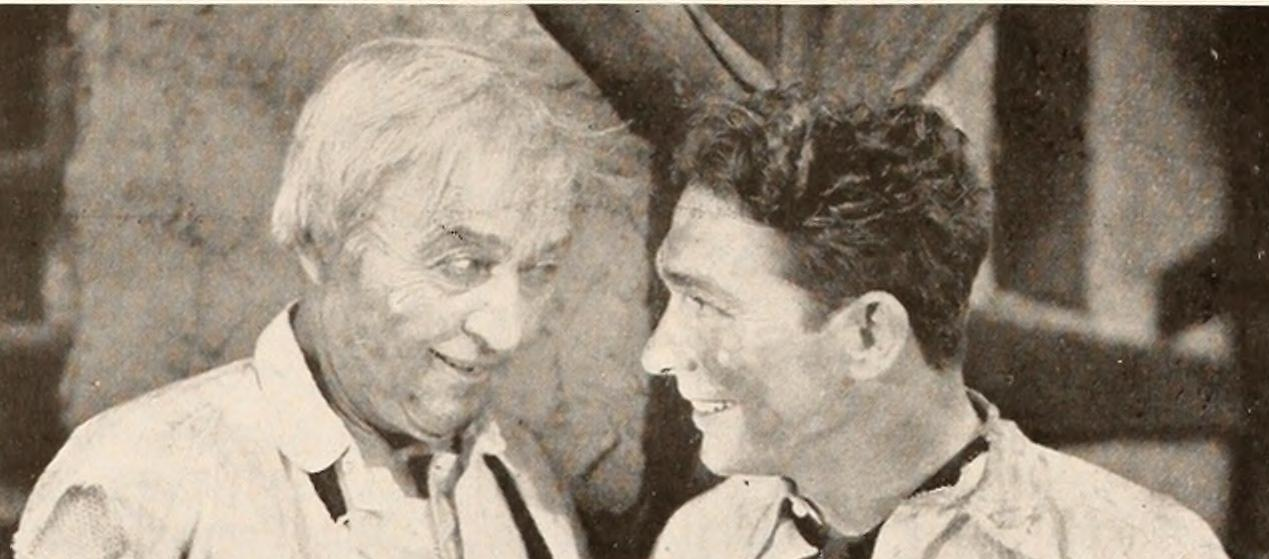
- Hobart Bosworth and Charles Delaney in a still featured in Motion Picture News
- Directed by: George B. Seitz
- Written by: Will M. Ritchey; Harold Shumate
- Produced by: Harry Cohn
- Starring: Hobart Bosworth
- Cinematography: Joseph Walker
- Edited by: Arthur Roberts
- Distributed by: Columbia Pictures Corporation
- Release date: April 19, 1928
- Running time: 55 minutes
- Country: United States
- Language: Silent

After the Storm is a 1928 American silent drama film directed by George B. Seitz. A print of the film exists at the Cinematheque Royale de Belgique.

== Cast ==
- Hobart Bosworth as Manin Dane
- Eugenia Gilbert as Joan Wells/Mary Brian
- Charles Delaney as Joe Dane
- Maude George as Molly O'Doon
- George Kuwa as A. Hop
- Linda Loredo as Malay Dancer
