= Pretty Clothes =

1927 film directed by Phil Rosen

- Directed by: Phil Rosen
- Screenplay by: Frances Guihan (scenario); Edwin Myers (adaptation); Wyndham Gittens (titles)
- Story by: Peggy Gaddis
- Produced by: Joe Rock
- Starring: Jobyna Ralston; Gertrude Astor; Johnny Walker
- Cinematography: Herbert Kirkpatrick
- Production company: Sterling Pictures
- Release date: October 15, 1927 (US)
- Running time: 6 reels
- Country: United States
- Language: English

Pretty Clothes is a 1927 American silent drama film, directed by Phil Rosen. It stars Jobyna Ralston, Gertrude Astor, and Johnny Walker, and was released on October 15, 1927.

== Cast list ==
- Jobyna Ralston as Marion Dunbar
- Gertrude Astor as Rose Dunbar
- Johnny Walker as Russell Thorpe
- Lloyd Whitlock as Philip Bennett
- Charles Clary as Thorpe Sr.
- Jack Mower as Albert Moore
- Lydia Knott as Mrs. Dunbar

== See also ==
- Gertrude Astor filmography

== Preservation status ==
- The film is preserved in the Library of Congress collection.
