= The Wall Flower =

1922 film directed by Rupert Hughes

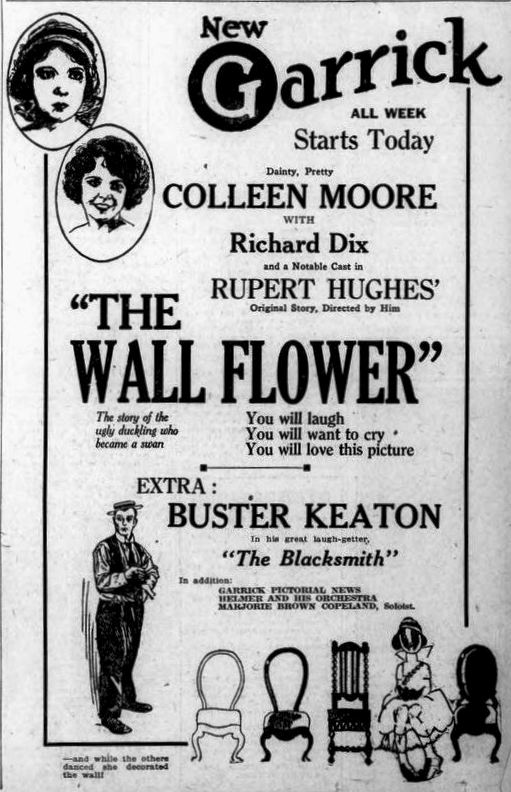
- Advertising for The Wall Flower on page 3 of the Duluth Herald (July 15, 1922).
- Directed by: Rupert Hughes
- Written by: Rupert Hughes
- Starring: Colleen Moore; Richard Dix; Gertrude Astor; Laura La Plante; Tom Gallery
- Cinematography: John J. Mescall
- Distributed by: Goldwyn Pictures
- Release date: May 1922
- Running time: 60 minutes
- Country: United States
- Language: Silent (English intertitles)

The Wall Flower is a 1922 American silent romantic drama film directed by Rupert Hughes and starring Colleen Moore, Richard Dix, Gertrude Astor, Laura La Plante, and Tom Gallery. The film was released by Goldwyn Pictures in May 1922.

== Plot ==
As described in a film magazine, Idalene Nobbin attends a village dance but, due to the constant nagging of her mother, she believes herself to be a constitutional wallflower. By great luck she gets a dance with college football star Roy Duncan, although Roy has eyes for the village belle Prue Nickerson. Phil Larrabee, another suitor for Prue's hand, tells Roy that Prue's name is Idalene Nobbin, and Roy sends an invitation to attend a "prom" dance. Idalene and her mother appear at the dance, and Roy bribes his fellow students to fill Idalene's dance card. She overhears part of the bargaining and, hurt and humiliated, she rushes from the dance and stumbles in front of a passing automobile. With both legs broken, she is picked up by Pamela Shiel and westerner Walt Breen. She confesses that she tried to kill herself, saying that she will never have a lover, a husband, home, or babies. Breen and Pamela decide to bring some sunshine into her life. After Idalene recovers, Pamela coaches her and dresses her in some gowns, and then gives a house party. The college cubs desert Prue for Idalene, but now she prefers the company of Breen, who then proposes and she accepts for a happy ending.

== Cast ==
- Colleen Moore as Idalene Nobbin
- Richard Dix as Walt Breen
- Gertrude Astor as Pamela Shiel
- Laura La Plante as Prue Nickerson
- Tom Gallery as Roy Duncan
- Rush Hughes as Phil Larrabee
- Dana Todd as Allen Lansing
- Fanny Stockbridge as Mrs. Nobbin
- Emily Rait as Mrs. Nickerson

== Preservation ==
With no holdings located in archives, The Wall Flower is considered a lost film.

== See also ==
- Gertrude Astor filmography
