= The Irresistible Lover =

1927 film

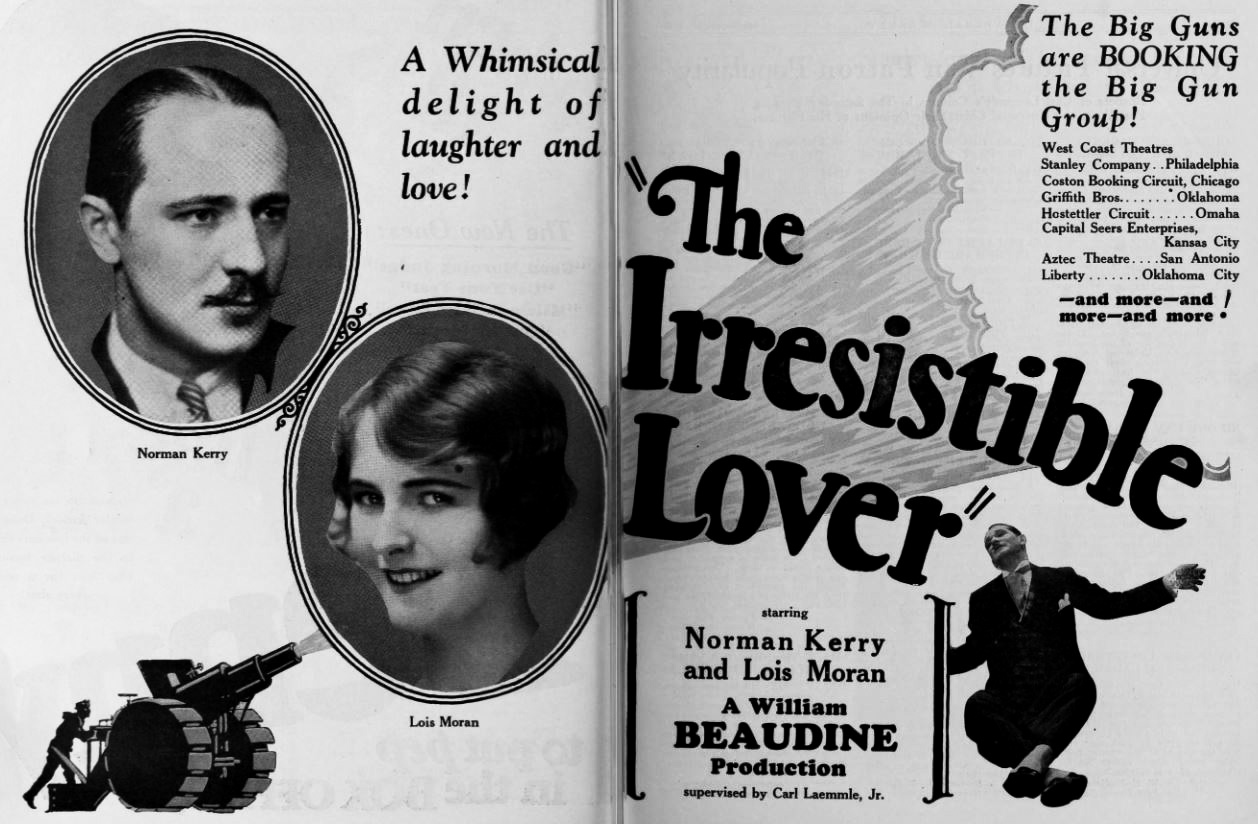
- Advertisement
- Directed by: William Beaudine
- Written by: Edward Ludwig; James J. Tynan
- Starring: Norman Kerry
- Cinematography: George Robinson
- Distributed by: Universal Pictures
- Release date: October 21, 1927
- Running time: 70 minutes
- Country: United States
- Language: Silent (English intertitles)

The Irresistible Lover is a 1927 American silent comedy film directed by William Beaudine.

== Cast ==
- Norman Kerry as J. Harrison Gray
- Lois Moran as Betty Kennedy
- Gertrude Astor as Dolly Carleton
- Lee Moran as Lawyer
- Myrtle Stedman as Hortense Brown
- Phillips Smalley as Mr. Brown
- Arthur Lake as Jack Kennedy
- Walter James as Mr. Kennedy
- George C. Pearce as Smith (credited as George Pearce)

== Preservation ==
With no prints of The Irresistible Lover located in any film archives, it is a lost film.

== See also ==
- Gertrude Astor filmography
