= Bucking Broadway =

1917 film directed by John Ford

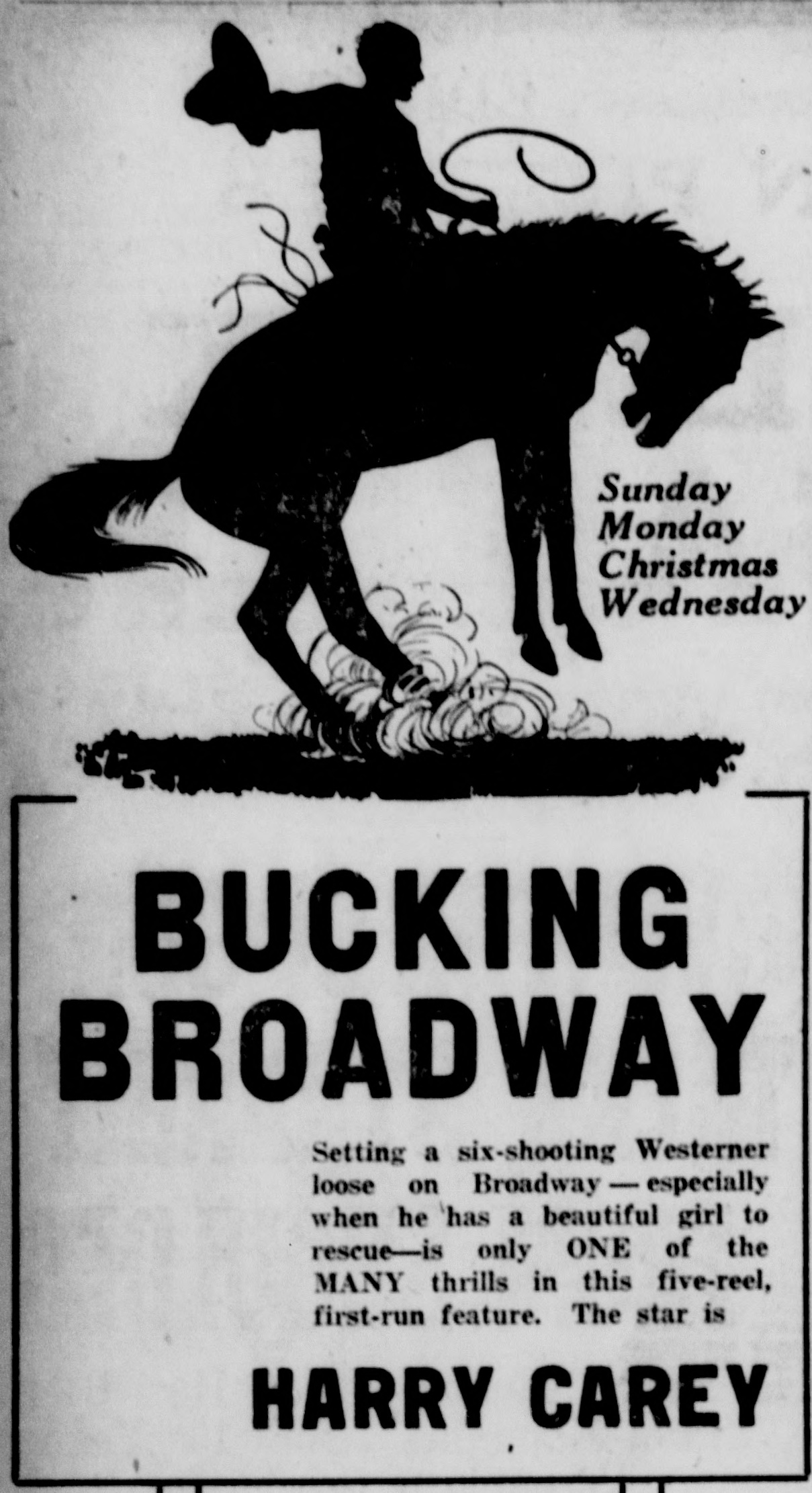
- Contemporary advertisement
- Directed by: John Ford
- Written by: George Hively
- Produced by: Harry Carey
- Starring: Harry Carey; Molly Malone
- Cinematography: John W. Brown; Ben F. Reynolds
- Production company: Universal Film Manufacturing Company
- Distributed by: Universal Film Manufacturing Company
- Release date: December 24, 1917
- Running time: 53 minutes (restored version)
- Country: United States
- Languages: Silent; English intertitles

Bucking Broadway

Bucking Broadway is a 1917 American silent Western film directed by John Ford, probably his sixth feature film. Long thought to be lost, along with about 60 of Ford's 70 silent films, it was found in 2002 in the archives of the French National Center for Cinematography (CNC). It was subsequently restored and digitized and is available on the Criterion Blu-Ray of John Ford's Stagecoach.

== Plot ==
As described in a film magazine, Cheyenne Harry (Carey), one of the cowboys on a ranch in Wyoming, falls in love with Helen (Malone), his boss's daughter. She decides to elope to the city with Captain Thornton (Pegg), a wealthy visitor to the ranch from New York. Cheyenne and Helen's father (Wells) are downhearted. Cheyenne, devastated by the loss of his finance, decides to go to the city to rescue her, and finds Thorton giving a dinner party in a hotel about to announce his engagement to Helen. As the dinner progresses Helen discovers the true nature of Thornton and endeavors to escape from him. Cheyenne comes to her rescue and, with the assistance of some cowboys, clean up the place, leaving Cheyenne and Helen reunited.

== Cast ==
- Harry Carey as Harry "Cheyenne Harry" Henderson
- Molly Malone as Helen
- L. M. Wells as Helen's Father
- Vester Pegg as Thornton
- William Steele as Foreman (credited as William Gettinger)
- Gertrude Astor as Gladys (uncredited)
- Martha Mattox as Shocked Customer In Store (uncredited)

== Reception ==
Like many American films of the time, Bucking Broadway was subject to cuts by city and state film censorship boards. The Chicago Board of Censors required a cut of the intertitle "While Helen makes the acquaintance of Gladys" etc., seven scenes of young woman in low cut gown and distant scene, reduce length of fight scenes by half, striking man on head with bottle, six struggle scenes with young woman at table, three closeups of man trying to kiss woman, three scenes of intoxicated man at table, throwing man across table and punching him, two scenes of throwing man over trellis, Cheyenne kicking and striking man, scene of Cheyenne striking intoxicated man, and the scene in background with young woman in low cut gown sitting on couch with man.

== See also ==
- Harry Carey filmography
- List of American films of 1917
- List of rediscovered films
- Gertrude Astor filmography
