= Linda Loredo =

American actress (1907–1931)

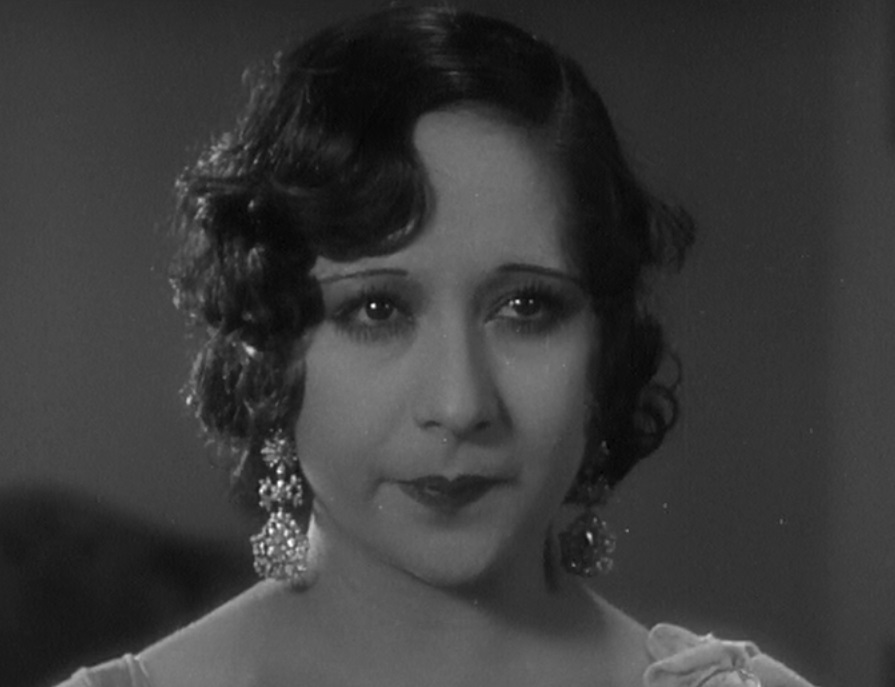
- Born: Herlinda Loredo; June 20, 1907; Arizona Territory
- Died: August 11, 1931 (aged 24); Los Angeles, California, U.S.
- Occupation: Actress
- Years active: 1927-1931

Linda Loredo (June 20, 1907 – August 11, 1931) was an American-born actress and dancer of Mexican descent. She is most commonly associated with Spanish language versions of Laurel and Hardy short subjects. Her sister, Maria Loredo, was also an actress.

== Career ==
Loredo was born in Arizona Territory. She entered silent films in 1927, playing Carmen in the ten-installment silent serial Heroes of the Wild, but her career really came into its own with the advent of sound. The Hal Roach Studios produced foreign-language versions of their most popular series – Laurel and Hardy, Charley Chase, Our Gang and Harry Langdon – for the lucrative Spanish markets in both hemispheres.

She appeared in four Laurel and Hardy shorts, including an English-speaking one, Come Clean, which was released after her death. She is one of only two actresses to have played both Laurel's and Hardy's wife, alongside Isabelle Keith, and the only one to have done so more than once.

Typically, the headline stars would stay on upon completion of the English-language version, and then would speak their foreign lines phonetically from cue cards in shot-for-shot remakes; they would be joined by native-speaking supporting players to round out the cast. Loredo's fluency in Spanish was of great value in the making of these films.

== Death ==
Loredo entered Queen of Angels Hospital on June 11, 1931, for an emergency appendectomy and succumbed two months later to peritonitis, age 24.

== Filmography ==
- Heroes of the Wild (1927) – Carmen
- After the Storm (1928) – Malay Dancer
- Great Gobs (1929)
- La Vida Nocturna (1930) – Sra. Laurel
- El Jugador de Golf (1930)
- La Estación de Gasolina (1930)
- ¡Pobre Infeliz! (1930)
- Radiomanía (1930) – Sra. Hardy
- Politiquerías (1931) – Sra. Hardy
- El Alma de la Fiesta (1931) – Doctora
- La Señorita de Chicago (1931)
- Come Clean (1931) – Mrs. Laurel
