= The Impossible Mrs. Bellew =

1922 film

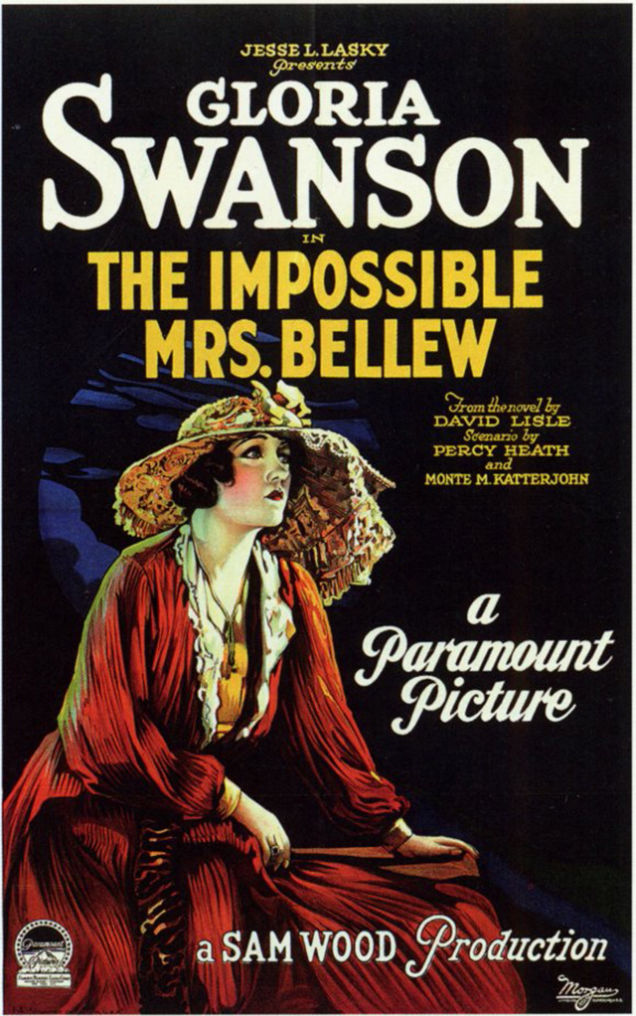
- Film poster
- Directed by: Sam Wood
- Written by: Percy Heath; Monte M. Katterjohn
- Based on: The Impossible Mrs. Bellew by David Lisle
- Starring: Gloria Swanson
- Cinematography: Alfred Gilks
- Production company: Famous Players–Lasky
- Distributed by: Famous Players–Lasky; Paramount Pictures
- Release date: October 22, 1922
- Running time: 80 minutes
- Country: United States
- Language: Silent (English intertitles)

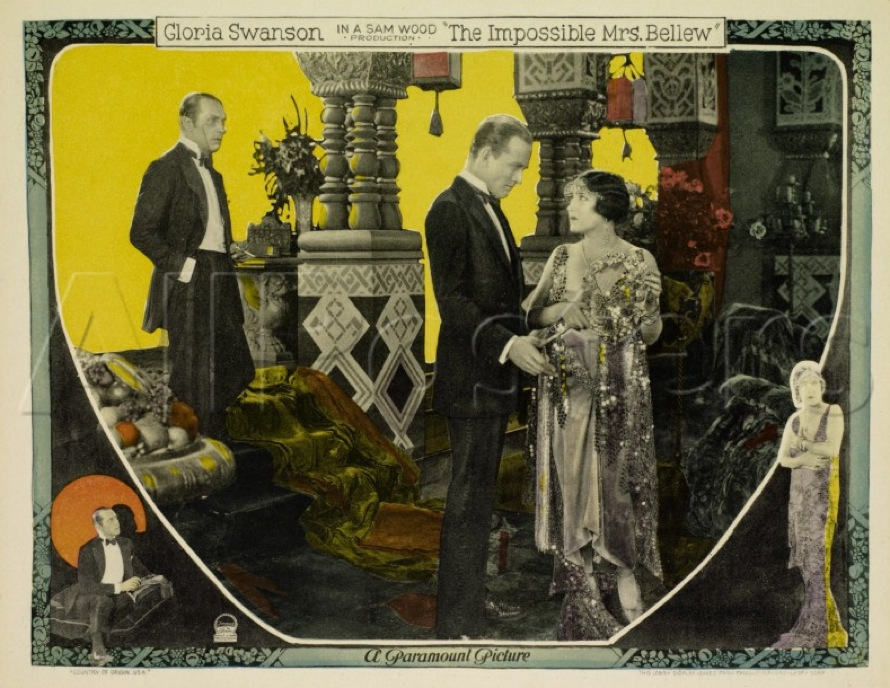
lobby card

The Impossible Mrs. Bellew is a 1922 American silent drama film directed by Sam Wood and starring Gloria Swanson. The film is based on the 1916 novel of the same name by David Lisle.

== Plot ==
As described in a film magazine review, Lance Bellew likes his mistress better than his wife Betty. This is resented by Jerry Woodruff, a friend of the family. Lance becomes suspicious of the relations between Jerry and his wife, and in a fight he shoots Jerry. A clever lawyer, by working on her love for her little son, gets Betty to testify for her husband. Lance is acquitted on the basis that the killing was justified. To humiliate her, Lance divorces his wife and obtains custody of the child. Mrs. Bellew finds how hard it is to get along with a ruined reputation. With a new friend who is a constant help to her, she overcomes her difficulties and her child is restored to her.

== Cast ==
- Gloria Swanson as Betty Bellew
- Robert Cain as Lance Bellew
- Conrad Nagel as John Helstan
- Richard Wayne as Jerry Woodruff
- Frank Elliott as Count Radistoff
- Gertrude Astor as Alice Granville
- June Elvidge as Naomi Templeton
- Herbert Standing as Rev. Dr. Helstan
- Michael D. Moore as Lance Bellew, Jr. (age 4)
- Pat Moore as Lance Bellew, Jr. (age 6)
- Helen Dunbar as Aunt Agatha
- Arthur Stuart Hull as Attorney Potter
- Clarence Burton as Detective

== Preservation ==
With no prints of The Impossible Mrs. Bellew located in any film archives, it is a lost film.

== See also ==
- Gertrude Astor filmography
