= The Wanters =

1923 film directed by John M. Stahl

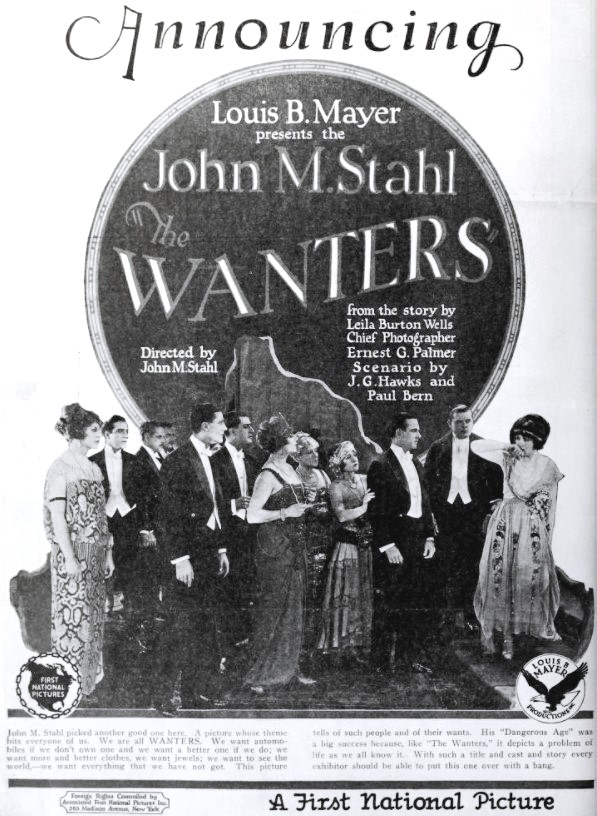
- Advertisement
- Directed by: John M. Stahl
- Written by: Paul Bern; J.G. Hawks
- Story by: Leila Burton Wells
- Produced by: Louis B. Mayer
- Starring: Marie Prevost; Norma Shearer; Gertrude Astor
- Cinematography: Ernest G. Palmer
- Edited by: Margaret Booth
- Production company: Louis B. Mayer Productions
- Distributed by: Associated First National Pictures
- Release date: November 26, 1923
- Running time: 70 mins.
- Country: United States
- Language: Silent (English intertitles)

The Wanters is a 1923 American silent society drama film produced by Louis B. Mayer, directed by John M. Stahl and distributed by Associated First National Pictures, which became First National Pictures in 1924. The film stars Marie Prevost, Robert Ellis, and Norma Shearer.

== Plot ==
As described in a film magazine review, Elliot Worthington falls in love with and weds Myra Hastings, the maid to his wealthy sister Mrs. Van Pelt. Myra is coldly received in society. Shocked by the hypocrisy and infidelities of the society men and women she encounters, she leaves. Her husband, who really loves her, follows and saves her when her foot becomes lodged in a railroad track switch. They are reconciled and face a happy future together.

== Cast ==
- Marie Prevost as Myra Hastings
- Robert Ellis as Elliot Worthington
- Norma Shearer as Marjorie
- Gertrude Astor as Mrs. Van Pelt
- Huntley Gordon as Theodore Van Pelt
- Lincoln Stedman as Bobby
- Lillian Langdon as Mrs. Worthington
- Louise Fazenda as Mary
- Hank Mann as Star boarder
- Lydia Yeamans Titus as Landlady
- Vernon Steele as Tom Armstrong
- Harold Goodwin as Chauffeur
- William Buckley as Butler

== Preservation ==
With no prints of The Wanters located in any film archives, it is a lost film.

== See also ==
- Gertrude Astor filmography
