= The Brazen Beauty =

1918 film

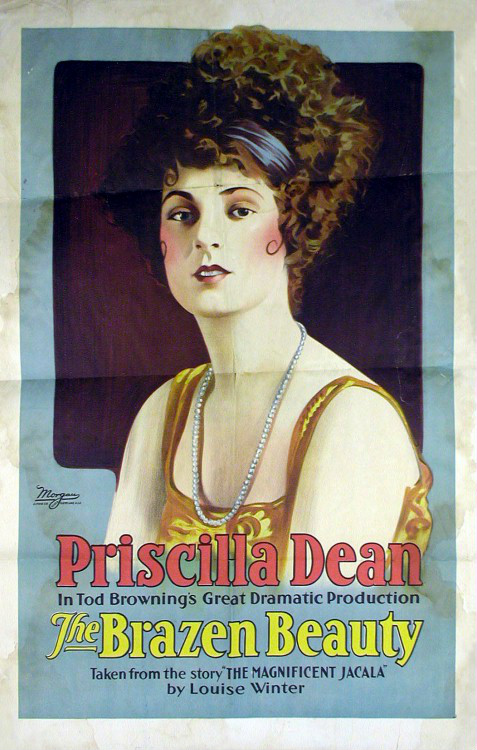
- Film poster
- Directed by: Tod Browning
- Written by: William E. Wing; Louise Winter
- Starring: Priscilla Dean; Gertrude Astor
- Cinematography: Alfred Gosden
- Distributed by: Universal Film Manufacturing Company
- Release date: September 9, 1918
- Running time: 50 minutes
- Country: United States
- Language: Silent (English intertitles)

The Brazen Beauty is a 1918 American silent comedy film directed by Tod Browning. It is not known whether the film currently survives, which suggests that it may be a lost film.

== Cast ==
- Priscilla Dean as Jacala Auehli
- Gertrude Astor as Mrs. Augusta Van Ruysdael
- Thurston Hall as Kenneth Hyde
- Katherine Griffith as Aunt Ellen
- Alice Wilson as Kate Dewey
- Leo White as Tony Dewey
- Hans Unterkircher as Bruce Edwards (credited as Thornton Church)
- Rex De Rosselli
- Edith Roberts as Undetermined Role (uncredited) (unconfirmed)

== Reception ==
Variety's review was positive, describing the film as being "clean and full of good healthy laughs."

== Censorship ==
Like many American films of the time, The Brazen Beauty was subject to cuts by city and state film censorship boards. For example, the Chicago Board of Censors required, in Reel 4, cuts of two scenes and the flashing of three scenes of a young woman in a boat where her gown was considered indecently low.
