= The Little Orphan (1917 film) =

1917 film directed by Jack Conway

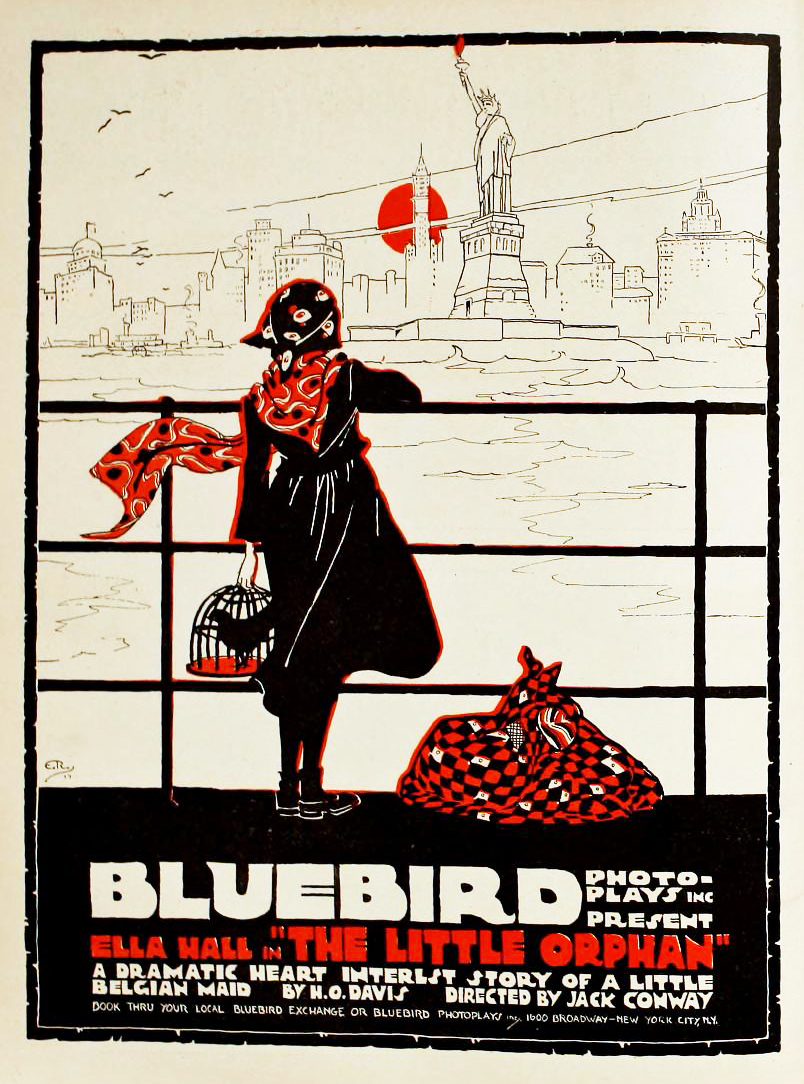
- Directed by: Jack Conway
- Written by: H.O. Davis; Bess Meredyth; Elliott J. Clawson
- Starring: Ella Hall; Gertrude Astor; Gretchen Lederer
- Cinematography: Edward A. Kull
- Production company: Universal Pictures
- Distributed by: Universal Pictures
- Release date: June 18, 1917
- Running time: 5 reels
- Country: United States
- Languages: Silent; English intertitles

The Little Orphan is a 1917 American silent drama film directed by Jack Conway and starring Ella Hall, Gertrude Astor and Gretchen Lederer. Prints and/or fragments were found in the Dawson Film Find in 1978.

== Cast ==
- Ella Hall as Rene Lescere
- Jack Conway as David Clark
- Gertrude Astor as Emmeline Warren
- Gretchen Lederer as Mrs. Billy Hardwick
- Dick La Reno as Dick Porter
- George Webb as Jerry Mathers
- George Hupp as Henri Pelour
- Chandler House as Jean Bourget, as a child
- Ernest Shields as Jean Bourget
- Margaret Whistler as Fannie Harrison

== Bibliography ==
- James Robert Parish & Michael R. Pitts. Film directors: a guide to their American films. Scarecrow Press, 1974.
