= Jet Job =

1952 American aviation action film directed by William Beaudine

- Theatrical film poster
- Directed by: William Beaudine
- Written by: Charles R. Marion
- Produced by: Ben Schwalb
- Starring: Stanley Clements; John Litel; Bob Nichols
- Cinematography: Marcel Le Picard
- Edited by: Walter Hannemann
- Music by: Edward J. Kay
- Production company: Monogram Productions, Inc.
- Distributed by: Monogram Distributing Corp.
- Release date: March 6, 1952
- Running time: 63 minutes
- Country: United States
- Language: English

Jet Job is a 1952 American aviation action film directed by William Beaudine and starring Stanley Clements, John Litel and Bob Nichols. The film features stock footage of various types of U.S. Air Force military aircraft. The film takes its title from a 1940s description of the first jet aircraft.

== Plot ==
Test pilot Joe Kovak works for Sam Bentley, the former partner of Joe's dead father. Because Joe's father was killed while flying, his mother is afraid for her son. Joe's brash attitude and tendency to disobey orders is jeopardizing Bentley's chance of securing an important government contract.

Bentley's rival Oscar Collins wants Joe to work for his company, hoping to capitalize on Joe's ability to fly high speed aircraft. After Bentley, exasperated by Joe's defiance, fires him, Collins offers his public relations manager Marge Stevens a $500 bonus if she can convince Joe to sign with his company. Infatuated with Marge, Joe agrees to work for Collins.

However, Joe finds the Collins aircraft inferior, and during a test flight, the prototype crashes. Joe escapes unharmed, but appearing before an investigation board, Collins blames Joe for the accident, and Joe's flight license is revoked. When Joe learns about Marge's bonus, he becomes even more determined to prove that he is the top test pilot, although he has no aircraft to fly.

Discovering that Bentley has planned a test to demonstrate his aircraft to the government, Joe sneaks into the plant and operates the test flight. Government officials award Bentley Aircraft the lucrative contact. Joe regains his license and returns to work for Bentley, and he is able to accept that Marge is in love with him.

== Cast ==
- Stanley Clements as Joe Kovak
- John Litel as Sam Bentley
- Robert Nichols as Dynamo Jackson
- Elena Verdugo as Marge Stevens
- Todd Karns as Peter Arlen
- Tom Powers as Oscar Collins
- Russ Conway as Stanley Reid
- Stephen Roberts as Jack Bradford
- John Kellogg as Alvin Fanchon
- Arthur Space as Davison
- Bob Peoples as Willie Hanson
- Paul Stanton as Chairman
- Robert Spencer as Secretary
- Perc Launders as Photographer
- William Tannen as Col. Jamison
- William Forrest as Gen. Mason
- Dave Willock as Ripple
- Dorothy Adams as Mrs. Kovak
- Lucille Thompson as Waitress
- Gertrude Astor as Dance Partner

== Production ==
U.S. Air Force aircraft are prominently featured in Jet Job.

Production began on January 3, 1952 and was completed within two weeks.

Producer Ben Schwalb inserted stock footage of United States Air Force training films and obtained approval from Colonel William C. Lindley. The Lockheed T-33 training jet is featured prominently in the film.

== Reception ==
In a contemporary review for the Los Angeles Times, critic Grace Kingsley wrote: "Jet flying was bound to get itself into the movies, and tense excitement sparks this film."
