= The Concert (1921 film) =

1921 film by Victor Schertzinger

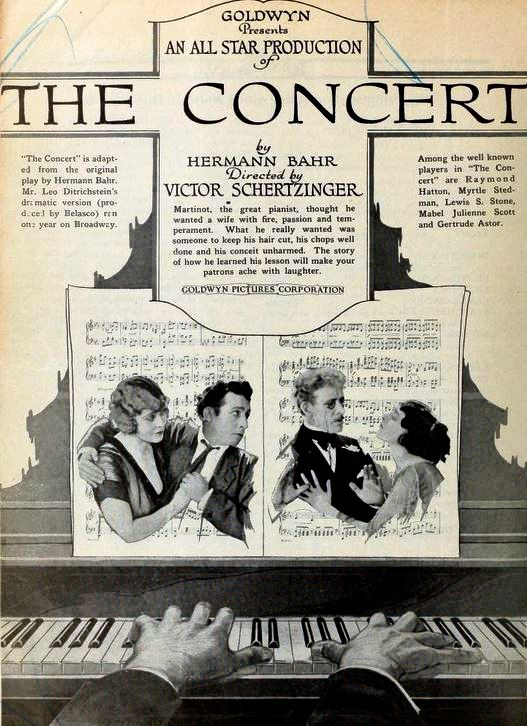
- Directed by: Victor Schertzinger
- Written by: Hermann Bahr (play)
- Produced by: Goldwyn Pictures
- Starring: Lewis Stone; Myrtle Stedman; Raymond Hatton
- Cinematography: George Webber
- Distributed by: Goldwyn Pictures
- Release date: February 20, 1921
- Running time: 60 minutes
- Country: United States
- Language: Silent...English intertitles

The Concert is a lost 1921 silent comedy film directed by Victor Schertzinger and starring Lewis Stone, Myrtle Stedman, Raymond Hatton and Mabel Julienne Scott. It was produced and distributed by Goldwyn Pictures. It was based upon the 1909 play of the same title by Hermann Bahr.

== Plot ==
A concert pianist, the romantic idol of many women, is seduced away from his wife. The seductress's husband takes in the pianist's wife, and all four pretend to be happy with the new arrangement.

== Cast ==
- Lewis Stone as Augustus Martinot
- Myrtle Stedman as Mary Martinot
- Raymond Hatton as Dr. Hart
- Mabel Julienne Scott as Delphine Hart
- Gertrude Astor as Eva
- Russ Powell as Pollinger
- Lydia Yeamans Titus as Mrs. Pollinger
- Frances Hall as Secretary
- Louie Cheung as Chinese Servant
