= The Strong Man =

1926 film by Frank Capra

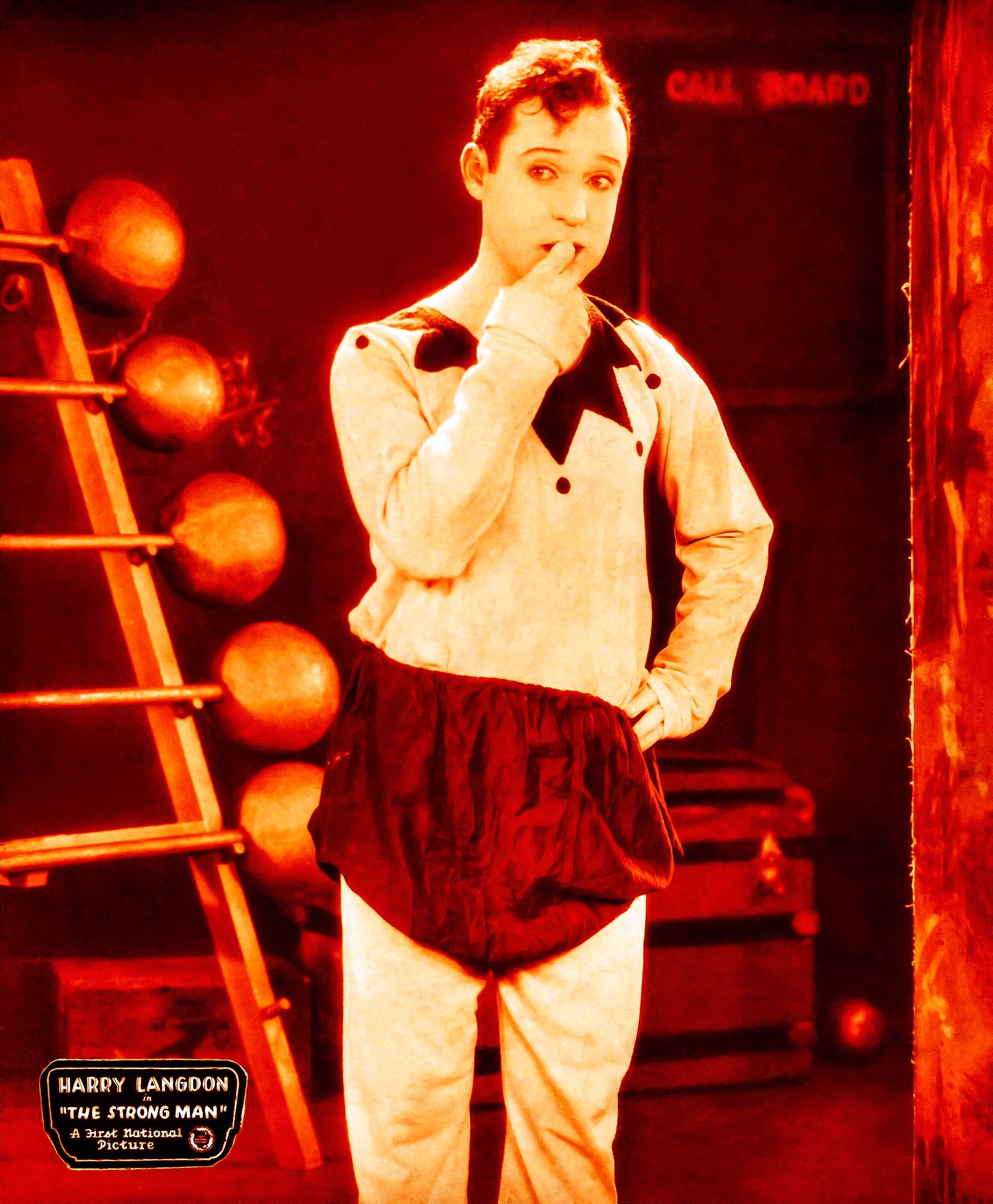
- Jumbo lobby card
- Directed by: Frank Capra
- Written by: Arthur Ripley (story); Hal Conklin (adaptation); Robert Eddy (adaptation); Reed Heustis (titles)
- Produced by: Harry Langdon
- Starring: Harry Langdon; Priscilla Bonner
- Cinematography: Glenn Kershner; Elgin Lessley
- Edited by: Harold Young; Arthur Ripley
- Music by: Carl Davis (1985) (orchestration: Kevin Townend)
- Production company: Harry Langdon Corporation
- Distributed by: First National Pictures
- Release date: September 19, 1926 (United States)
- Running time: 75 minutes
- Country: United States
- Languages: Silent; English intertitles

The Strong Man is a 1926 American silent comedy film starring Harry Langdon, who produced the film. It was directed by Frank Capra in his feature debut.

Along with Tramp, Tramp, Tramp, The Strong Man is Langdon's best-known feature film. Capra would also direct Langdon's next feature, Long Pants (1927), which would be their final collaboration.

== Plot ==
Paul Bergot is a Belgian emigrant to the United States who has fallen in love with Mary Brown, a blind woman. They met as pen-pals when he was fighting in Europe during World War I. Mary even sent Paul a photo of herself.

Paul searches for Mary Brown by asking every woman he meets if she is Mary Brown. By accident he rescues her town from crooks and bootleggers.

== Cast ==
- Harry Langdon as Paul Bergot
- Priscilla Bonner as Mary Brown
- Gertrude Astor as Lily of Broadway
- William V. Mong as Holy Joe
- Robert McKim as Mike McDevitt
- Arthur Thalasso as Zandow the Great

== Reception ==
=== Critical response ===
The Strong Man (1926)

The staff at Variety magazine liked the film and wrote, "A whale of a comedy production that has a wealth of slapstick, a rough-and-tumble finish and in the earlier passages bits of pantomimic comedy that are notable. Harry Langdon has a comic method distinct from other film fun makers. The quality of pathos enters into it more fully than the style of any other comedian with the possible exception of Chaplin. His gift of legitimate comedy here has a splendid vehicle."

More recently, critic Maria Schneider reviewed Langdon's work and wrote, "Not surprisingly, Langdon was most often cast as an oblivious innocent adrift in a corrupt world, a formula that made him terrifically popular in the mid-1920s. Of the three features Kino has released, The Strong Man (1926) is the best...Crisply timed and almost perfectly paced, it is also notable as Frank Capra's directorial debut."

Critic Richard von Busack wrote, "A little tragedy and a lot of laughs can be seen in 1926's The Strong Man... Later, on the crowded bus out west, Langdon demonstrates a sterling silent comedy bit: the one about the goof who mistakes a jar of stenchy Limburger cheese for Vicks' VapoRub. With exquisite deadpan, Langdon keeps the incident from being too sad; he deftly, repeatedly, sucker-punches a bully who protests against the smell. Director Frank Capra's energy and sturdy plot sense counterpoint Langdon's wonderful strangeness."

Reviewing Langdon's career and movies, silent film critic and author Dan Navarro wrote, "When Harry Langdon's Tramp, Tramp, Tramp premiered in March 1926, it was greeted by moviegoers as a worthy challenger to the great films of Charles Chaplin, Buster Keaton, and Harold Lloyd. Langdon was hailed as 'the fourth comedy genius.' That heady feeling was reinforced when, in September 1926, Langdon appeared in an even better picture, Frank Capra's The Strong Man...[the film] was Frank Capra's first directorial effort, and his genius shines through."

Lobby cards
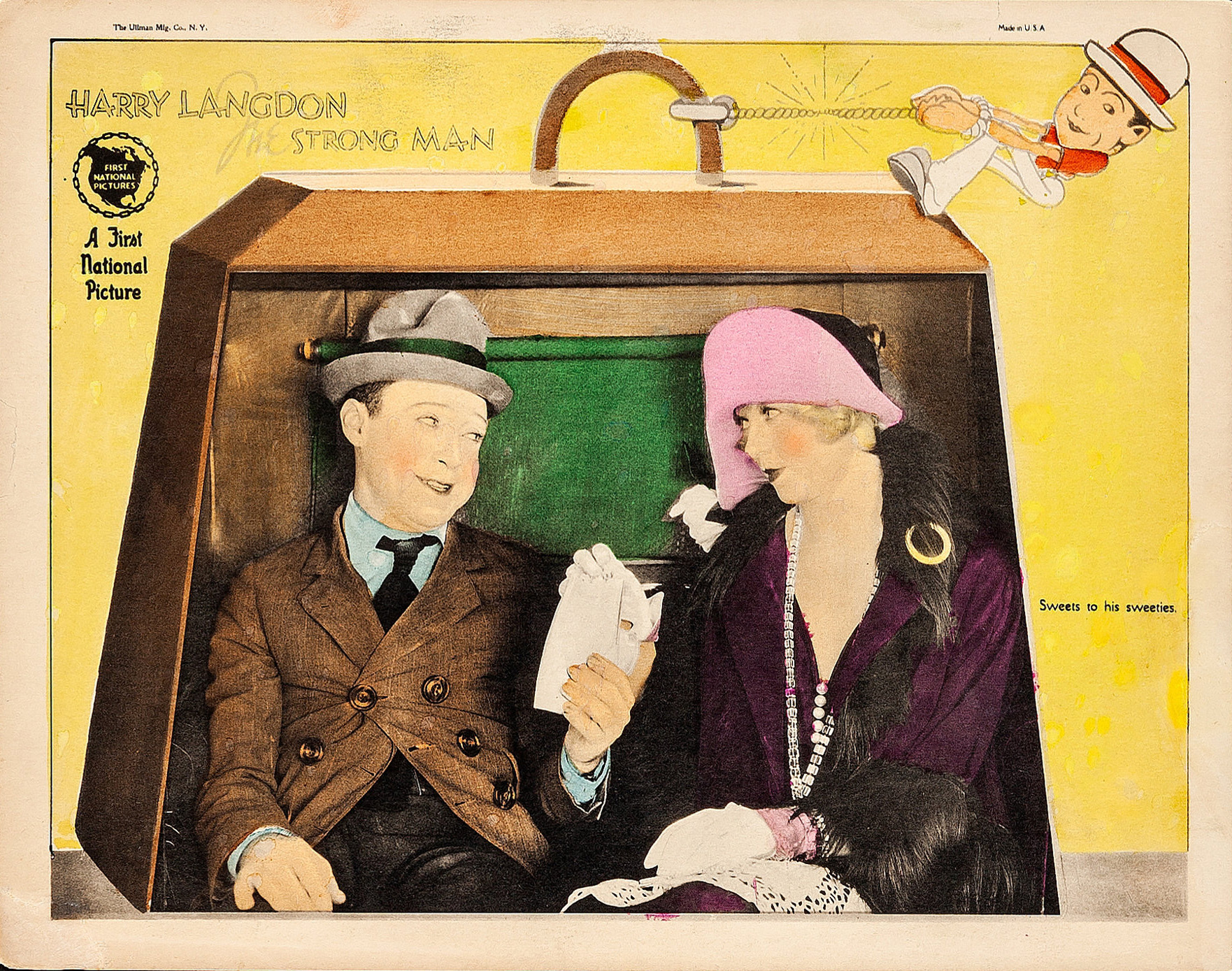
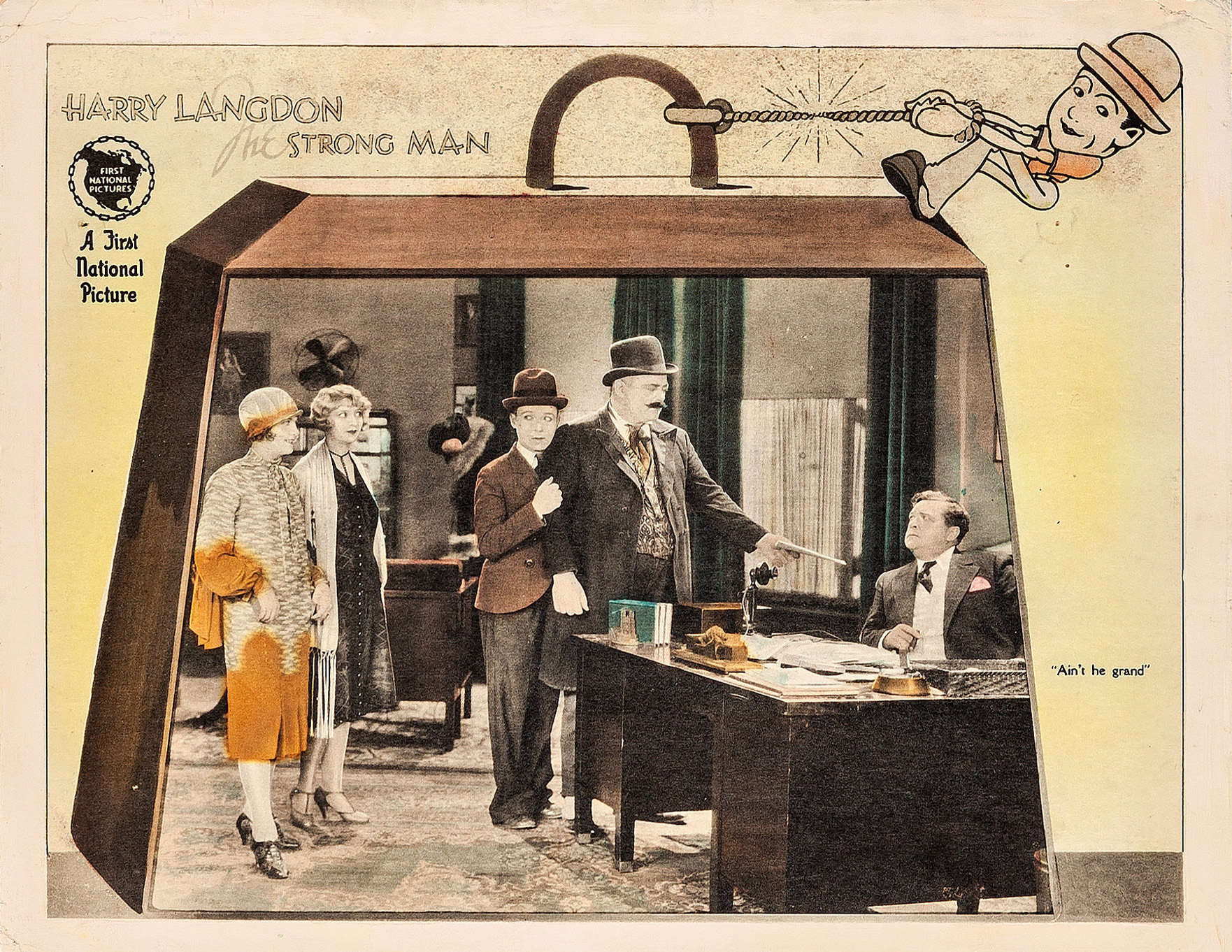

=== Awards ===
In 2007, The Strong Man was selected for preservation in the United States National Film Registry by the Library of Congress as being "culturally, historically, or aesthetically significant."

== Censorship ==
Before The Strong Man could be exhibited in Kansas, the Kansas Board of Review required the elimination of two scenes, one of a girl sitting in a man's lap in reel 3, and the other of "promiscuous kissing" in reel 7.

== See also ==
- List of United States comedy films
