= Through the Back Door =

1921 film

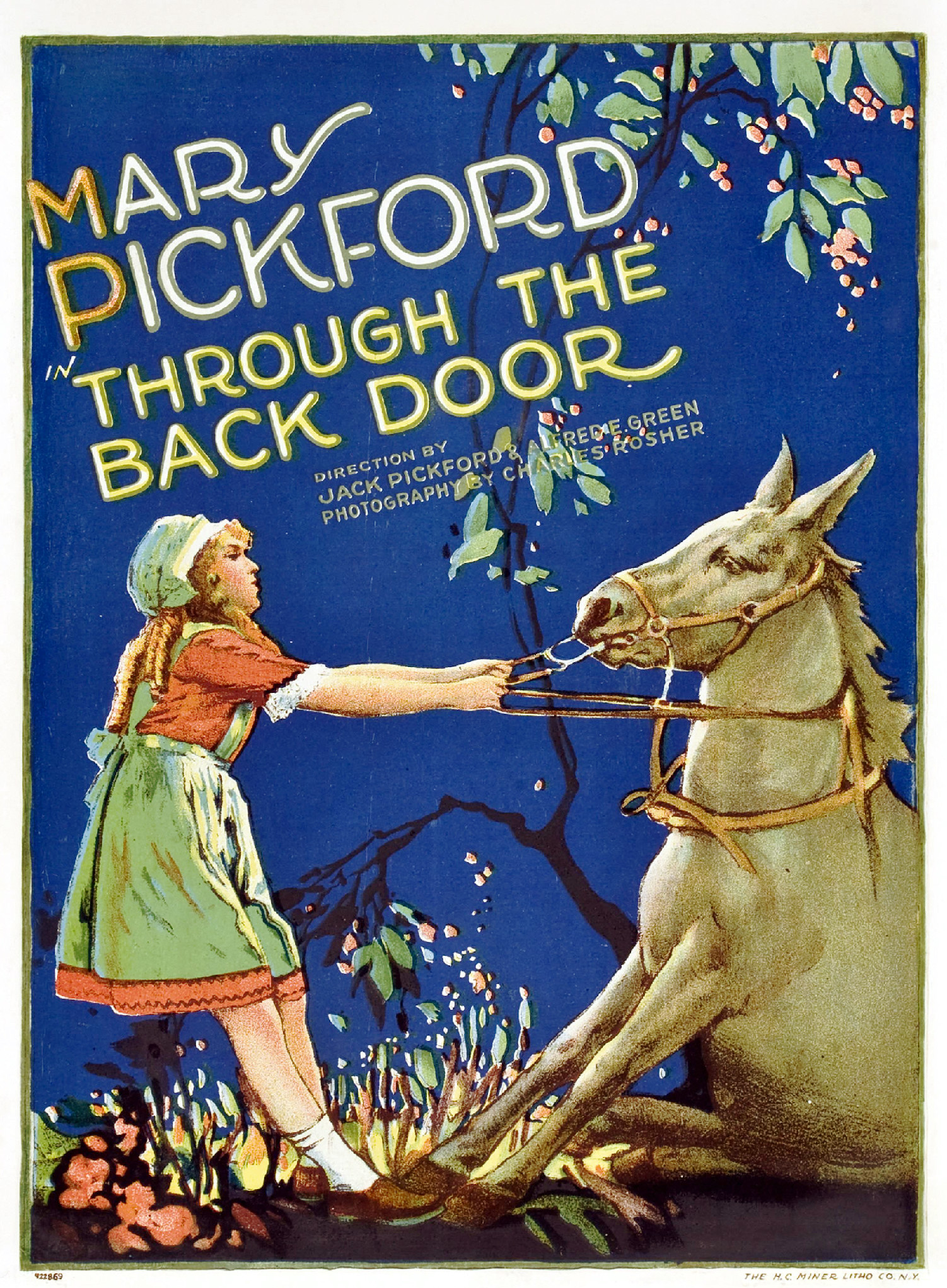
- Theatrical release poster
- Directed by: Alfred E. Green; Jack Pickford
- Written by: Gerald C. Duffy (aka Gerald Duffy); Marion Fairfax
- Produced by: Mary Pickford
- Starring: Mary Pickford; Gertrude Astor
- Cinematography: Charles Rosher
- Distributed by: United Artists
- Release date: May 5, 1921
- Running time: 89 minutes
- Country: United States
- Language: Silent (English intertitles)

Through the Back Door.

Through the Back Door is a 1921 American silent comedy drama film directed by Alfred E. Green and Jack Pickford, and starring Mary Pickford.

== Plot ==
In the early 1900s Belgium, Jeanne is the 10-year-old daughter of Louise. Troubles start when Louise remarries a selfish but rich man named Elton Reeves. He convinces her to move to America and leave Jeanne behind in Belgium to live with the maid Marie. At first Louise refuses to, but eventually gives in and leaves Jeanne in the care of Marie.

Five years pass and Jeanne and Marie bonded. Meanwhile, Louise hated living in America and feels guilty having left her kid behind. She returns to Belgium to reunite with Jeanne, but Marie does not want to give her up. When Louise finally arrives, Marie lies to her Jeanne drowned in a river nearby. Louise is devastated and collapses, before returning to America. This results in estranging from Elton.

World War I breaks out and Belgium is occupied by Germany. Marie fears for Jeanne's safety and brings her to America to live with her mother. After an emotional goodbye, Jeanne sets out for America to find her mother. Along the way she meets two orphan boys and decides to take care of them. When she finally arrives in America, she travels to Louise's big mansion.

Too afraid to tell her she is her daughter, Jeanne applies to serve as her maid. While pretending to be someone else, she gets to know her mother. However, she has trouble keeping up the lie and wants nothing more but have a reconciliation. Waiting for the right time to tell the truth, Jeanne hopes everything will come to a right end. When guests of the mansion plot to fleece Elton, Jeanne is forced to reveal her true identity to save the day. A happy reunion follows.

== Cast ==
- Mary Pickford as Jeanne
- Gertrude Astor as Louise Reeves
- Wilfred Lucas as Elton Reeves
- Helen Raymond as Marie
- C. Norman Hammond as Jacques Lanvain
- Elinor Fair as Margaret Brewster
- Adolphe Menjou as James Brewster
- Peaches Jackson as Conrad
- Doreen Turner as Constant
- John Harron as Billy Boy
- George Dromgold as Chauffeur
- Jeanne Carpenter as Jeanne (age 5)
