= Come Clean (1931 film) =

1931 film

- Theatrical release poster
- Directed by: James W. Horne
- Written by: H.M. Walker; Stan Laurel (uncredited)
- Produced by: Hal Roach
- Starring: Stan Laurel; Oliver Hardy; Gertrude Astor; Linda Loredo; Mae Busch; Charlie Hall; Tiny Sandford
- Cinematography: Art Lloyd
- Edited by: Richard C. Currier
- Music by: Marvin Hatley; Leroy Shield
- Release date: September 19, 1931
- Running time: 20:45
- Country: United States
- Language: English

Come Clean is a 1931 American pre-Code short film starring Laurel and Hardy, directed by James W. Horne and produced by Hal Roach.

== Plot ==
Mr. and Mrs. Hardy anticipate a quiet evening at home, but their plans are disrupted when Mr. and Mrs. Laurel unexpectedly visit. Subsequently, Stan and Ollie venture out to procure ice cream, only to encounter a distressed woman named Kate on the verge of attempting suicide. After intervening, the duo finds themselves entangled in Kate's demands for assistance, prompting a frantic effort to conceal her from their wives.

Despite their best efforts, Kate's presence is eventually discovered, leading to her arrest as a wanted criminal. Surprisingly, Stan learns that he is eligible for a $1,000 reward for capturing Kate, but his suggestion to use the money for ice cream results in an unexpected consequence orchestrated by Ollie.

== Cast ==
- Stan Laurel as Stan
- Oliver Hardy as Ollie
- Gertrude Astor as Mrs. Hardy
- Linda Loredo as Mrs. Laurel
- Mae Busch as Kate
- Charlie Hall as ice cream vendor
- Tiny Sandford as doorman

== Production notes ==
The opening scene of Come Clean is a revisitation of a sequence from Laurel and Hardy's silent film Should Married Men Go Home?. The plot of Come Clean served as the basis for the movie Brooklyn Orchid (1942), a Hal Roach Streamliner production starring William Bendix and Joe Sawyer.

Linda Loredo, portraying Mrs. Laurel in the film, had previously appeared in various foreign-language versions of earlier short films by Laurel and Hardy, marking her sole English-language role in their films. Loredo died on August 11, 1931, a month before the release of the film.
