= Hell Bound (1931 film) =

1931 film

- Directed by: Walter Lang
- Written by: Adele Comandini; Edward Dean Sullivan
- Produced by: Samuel Zierler
- Starring: Leo Carrillo
- Cinematography: Charles Schoenbaum
- Release date: May 1, 1931
- Running time: 81 minutes
- Country: United States
- Language: English

Hell Bound is a 1931 American pre-Code drama film directed by Walter Lang.

== Plot ==
A racketeer marries a singer who knows about his operation so that she cannot be compelled to testify against him in court.

== Cast ==
- Leo Carrillo as Nick Cotrelli
- Lloyd Hughes as Dr. Robert Sanford
- Ralph Ince as Dorgan
- Lola Lane as Platinum Reed
- Helene Chadwick as Sanford's Sister
- Richard Tucker as Gilbert
- Gertrude Astor as Rosie
- Frank Hagney as Hood
- Harry Strang as Gaspipe
