= Polly Redhead =

1917 film by Jack Conway

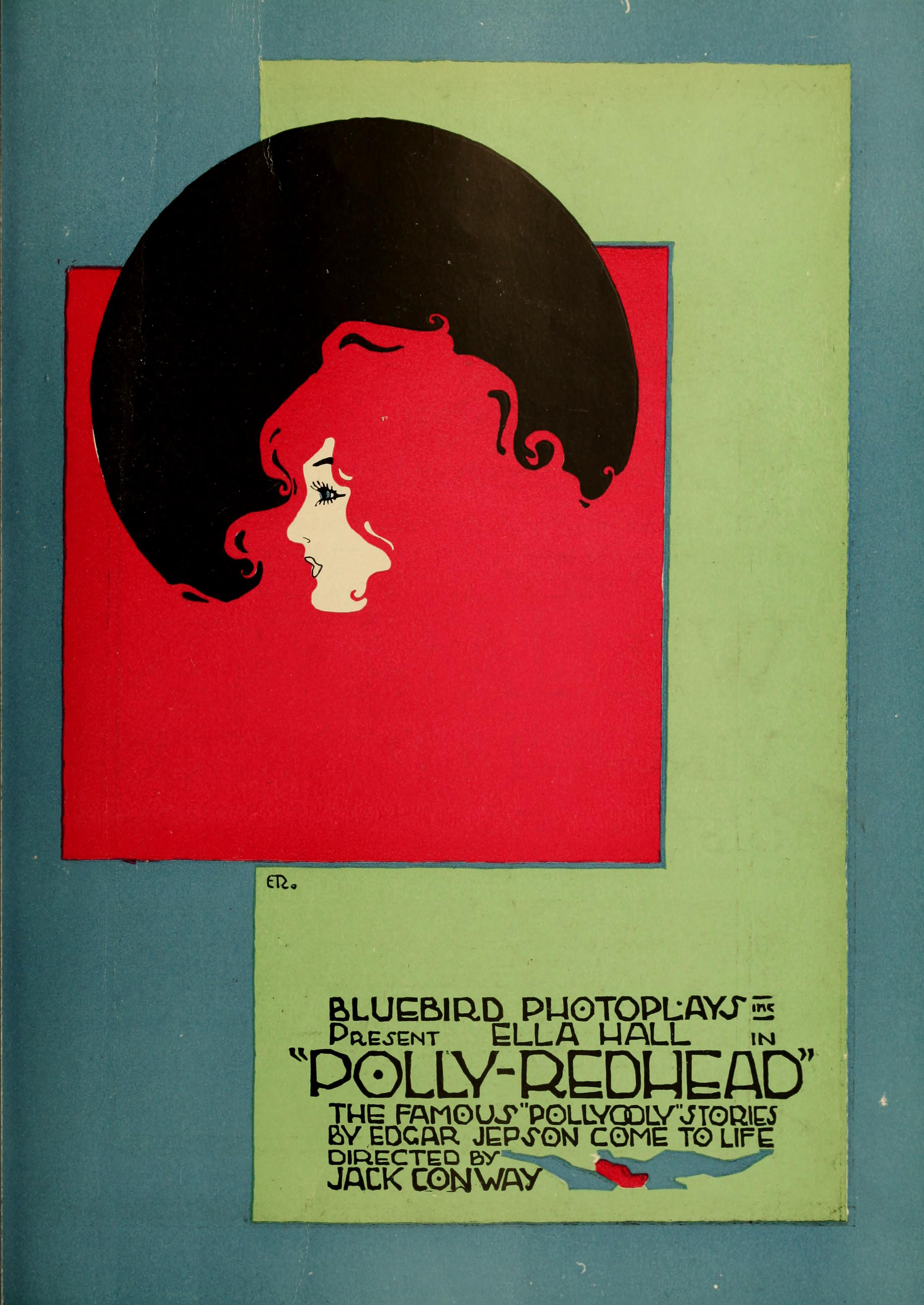
- Directed by: Jack Conway
- Written by: Edgar Jepson (novel); Elliott J. Clawson
- Starring: Ella Hall; Gertrude Astor; Charles Hill Mailes
- Cinematography: Edward A. Kull
- Production company: Universal Pictures
- Distributed by: Universal Pictures
- Release date: March 19, 1917
- Running time: 5 reels
- Country: United States
- Languages: Silent; English intertitles

Polly Redhead is a 1917 American silent comedy film directed by Jack Conway and starring Ella Hall, Gertrude Astor and Charles Hill Mailes.

== Cast ==
- Ella Hall as Polly Redhead
- Gertrude Astor as Lady Caroline
- Charles Hill Mailes as Duke of Osterley
- Gretchen Lederer as Lady Osterley
- Helen Wright as Mrs. Brown
- Louise Emmons as Mrs. Meekin
- George Webb as John Ruffin
- Dick La Reno as Gedge Tomkins
- James McCandlas as Ronald
- William Worthington Jr. as Edgar aka The Lump
- Raymond Whitaker as Diego Perez

== Bibliography ==
- James Robert Parish & Michael R. Pitts. Film directors: a guide to their American films. Scarecrow Press, 1974.
