= Western Limited =

1932 film directed by Christy Cabanne

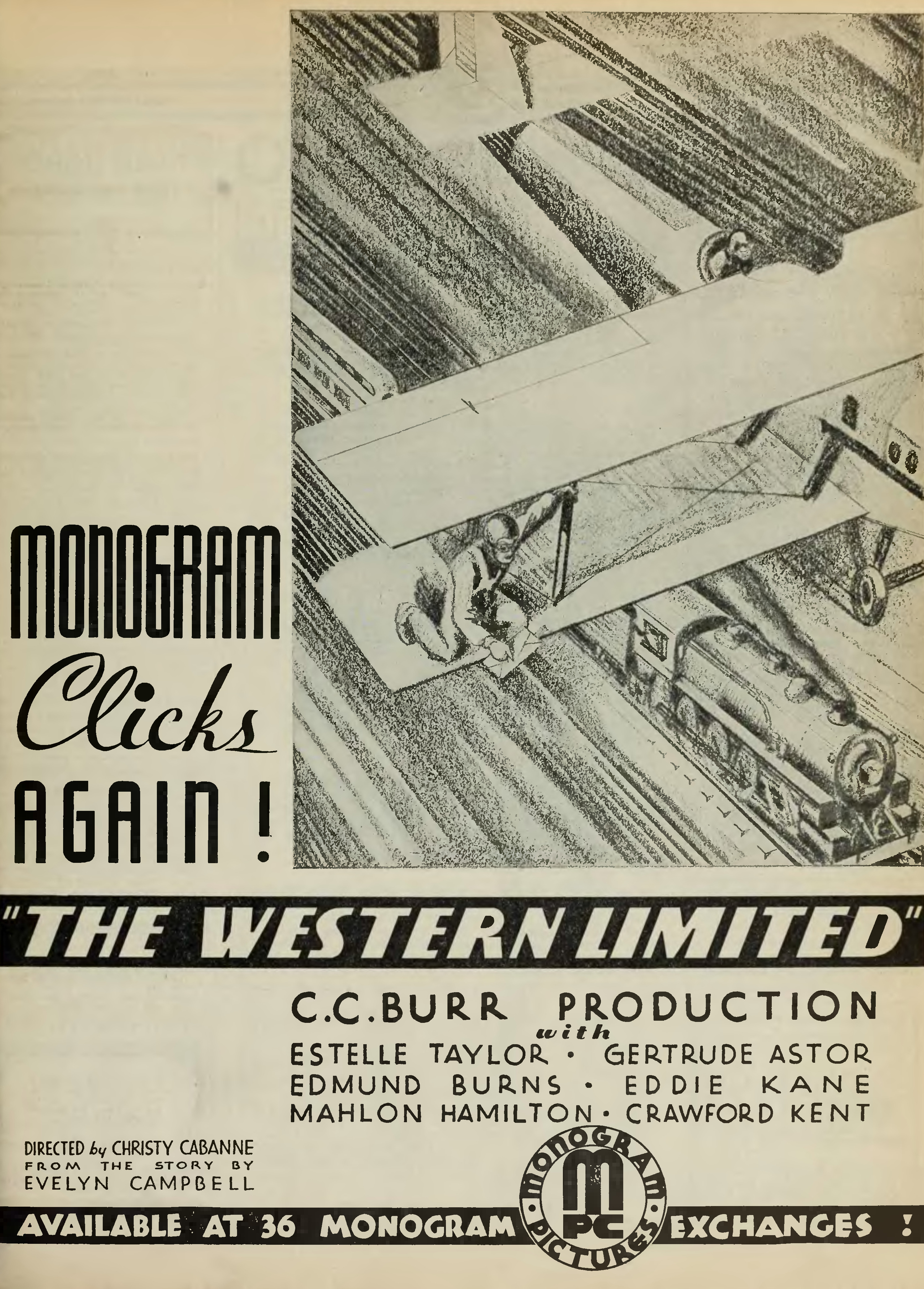
- Directed by: Christy Cabanne
- Screenplay by: Charles E. Roberts
- Story by: Evelyn Campbell
- Produced by: C.C. Burr
- Starring: Estelle Taylor; Edmund Burns; Lucien Prival
- Cinematography: Lewis Physioc
- Production company: Monogram Pictures
- Release date: August 5, 1932 (US)
- Running time: 7 reels
- Country: United States
- Language: English

Western Limited is a 1932 American drama film directed by Christy Cabanne and starring Estelle Taylor, Edmund Burns, and Lucien Prival. It was released on August 5, 1932.

== Cast ==
- Estelle Taylor as Doris, the secretary
- Edmund Burns as Sinclair
- Lucien Prival as Benoit
- Gertrude Astor as Mrs. Winters
- Eddie Kane as Frank
- James Burtis as Eddie
- John Vosper as Bracy (credited as John Vosburgh)
- Mahlon Hamilton as Wilkes
- Crauford Kent as James
- Adaline Asbury as Mrs. James
