= Stage Struck (1925 film) =

1925 film by Allan Dwan

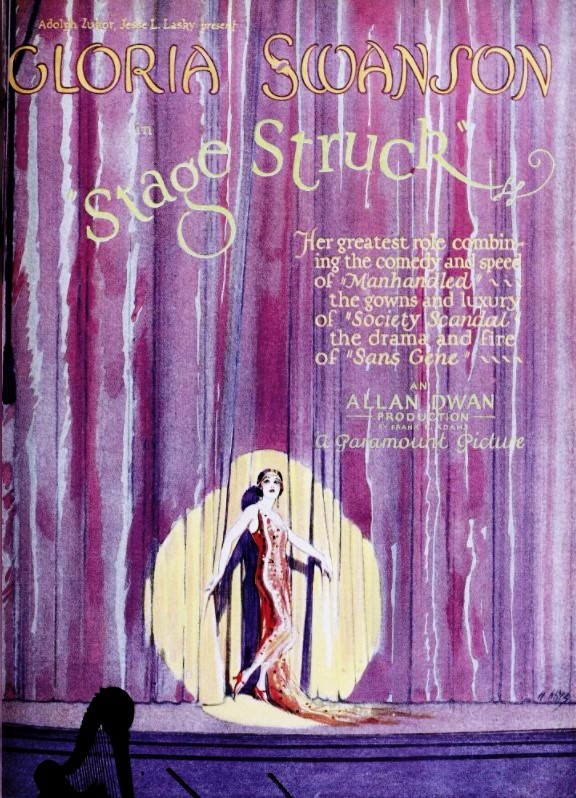
- Advertisement
- Directed by: Allan Dwan
- Written by: Sylvia LaVarre (adaptation)
- Screenplay by: Forrest Halsey
- Story by: Frank R. Adams
- Produced by: Adolph Zukor; Jesse L. Lasky
- Starring: Gloria Swanson; Lawrence Gray; Gertrude Astor; Ford Sterling
- Cinematography: George Webber
- Edited by: William LeBaron
- Distributed by: Paramount Pictures
- Release date: November 16, 1925
- Running time: 87 minutes
- Country: United States
- Language: Silent (English intertitles)

Stage Struck is a 1925 American silent comedy film starring Gloria Swanson, Lawrence Gray, Gertrude Astor, and Ford Sterling. The film was directed by Allan Dwan, and released by Paramount Pictures with the opening and ending sequences filmed in the early two-color Technicolor.

== Plot ==
As described in a film magazine review, Jennie Hagan, a waitress in a river town restaurant is in love with Orme Wilson, the hot cake artist, who is fond of actresses. She struggles hard to win him, even studying acting, and dreaming about the stage, and after many trials is successful.

== Cast ==
- Gloria Swanson as Jennie Hagen
- Lawrence Gray as Orme Wilson
- Gertrude Astor as Lillian Lyons
- Oliver Sandys as Hilda Wagner
- Ford Sterling as Buck
- Carrie Scott as Mrs. Wagner
- Emil Hoch as Mr. Wagner
- Margery Whittington as Soubrette

== Production notes ==
The majority of the film was shot in location in New Martinsville, West Virginia. Other sequences were shot at the Astoria Studio in Astoria, Queens.

== Preservation ==
Stage Struck (1925)

In 2004, the film, including its Technicolor sequences, was restored by the George Eastman Museum film archive. A copy of the film is also in the British Film Institute collection.

== See also ==
- List of early color feature films
