= The Taxi Dancer =

1927 film

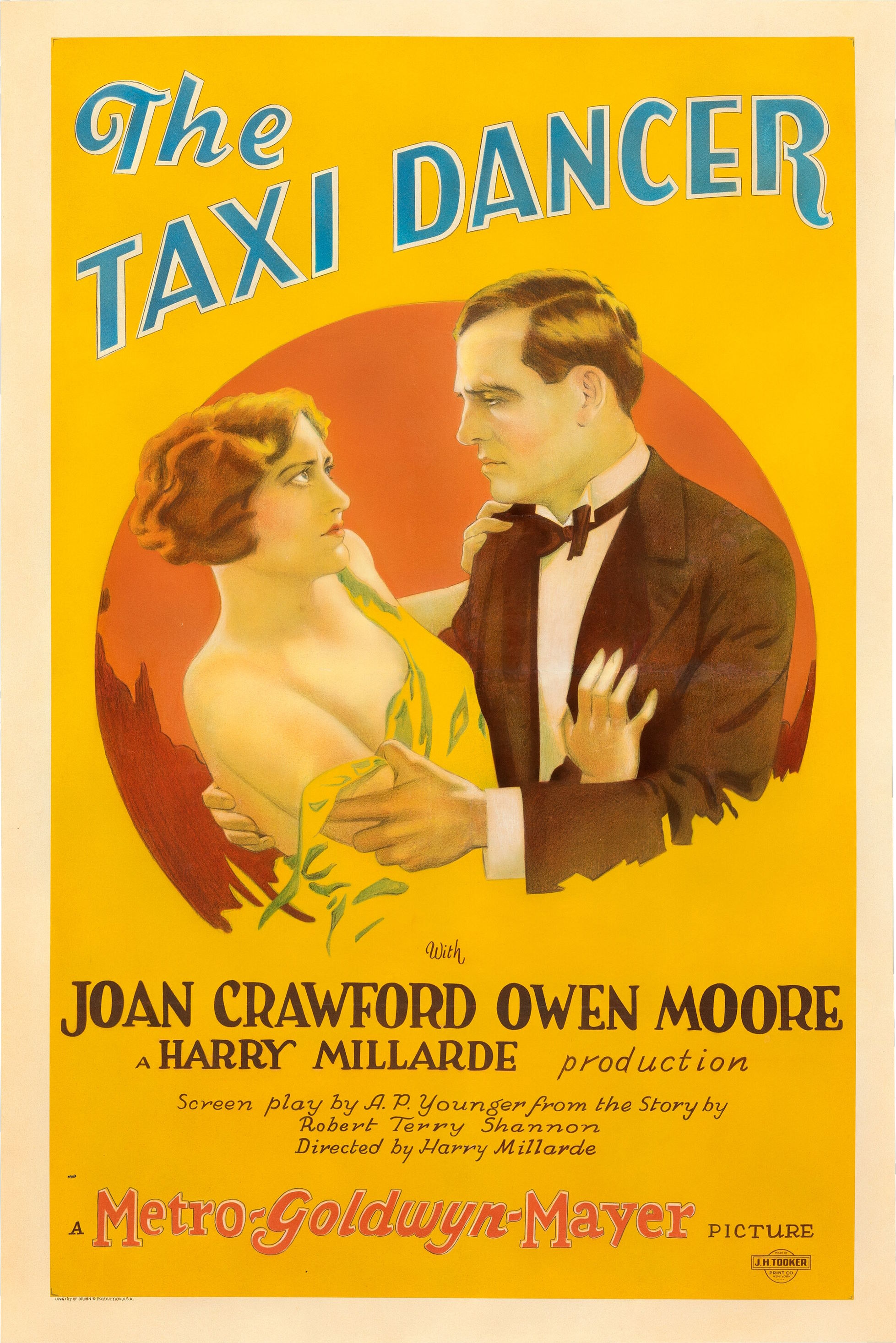
- Theatrical release poster
- Directed by: Harry F. Millarde
- Written by: Adaptation: A. P. Younger; Titles: Ralph Spence
- Story by: Robert Terry Shannon
- Starring: Joan Crawford; Owen Moore; Marc McDermott; Gertrude Astor
- Cinematography: Ira H. Morgan
- Distributed by: Metro-Goldwyn-Mayer
- Release date: February 5, 1927
- Running time: 64 minutes
- Country: United States
- Language: Silent (English intertitles)

The Taxi Dancer is a 1927 American silent comedy film directed by Harry F. Millarde and starring Owen Moore and, in her first film with top billing, Joan Crawford. A print of The Taxi Dancer exists.

== Plot ==
Joselyn Poe is a southern girl who tries her luck as dancer in New York City. When she is unable to find work, she works as taxi dancer and meets several suitors.

== Cast ==
- Joan Crawford as Joslyn Poe
- Owen Moore as Lee Rogers
- Marc McDermott as Henry Brierhalter
- Gertrude Astor as Kitty Lane
- Rockliffe Fellowes as Stephen Bates
- Douglas Gilmore as James Kelvin
- William Orlamond as 'Doc' Ganz
- Claire McDowell as Aunt Mary
- Bert Roach as Charlie Cook
- Lou Costello as Extra (uncredited)

== Crew ==
- David Townsend, set designer
