= The Devil's Pay Day =

1917 film

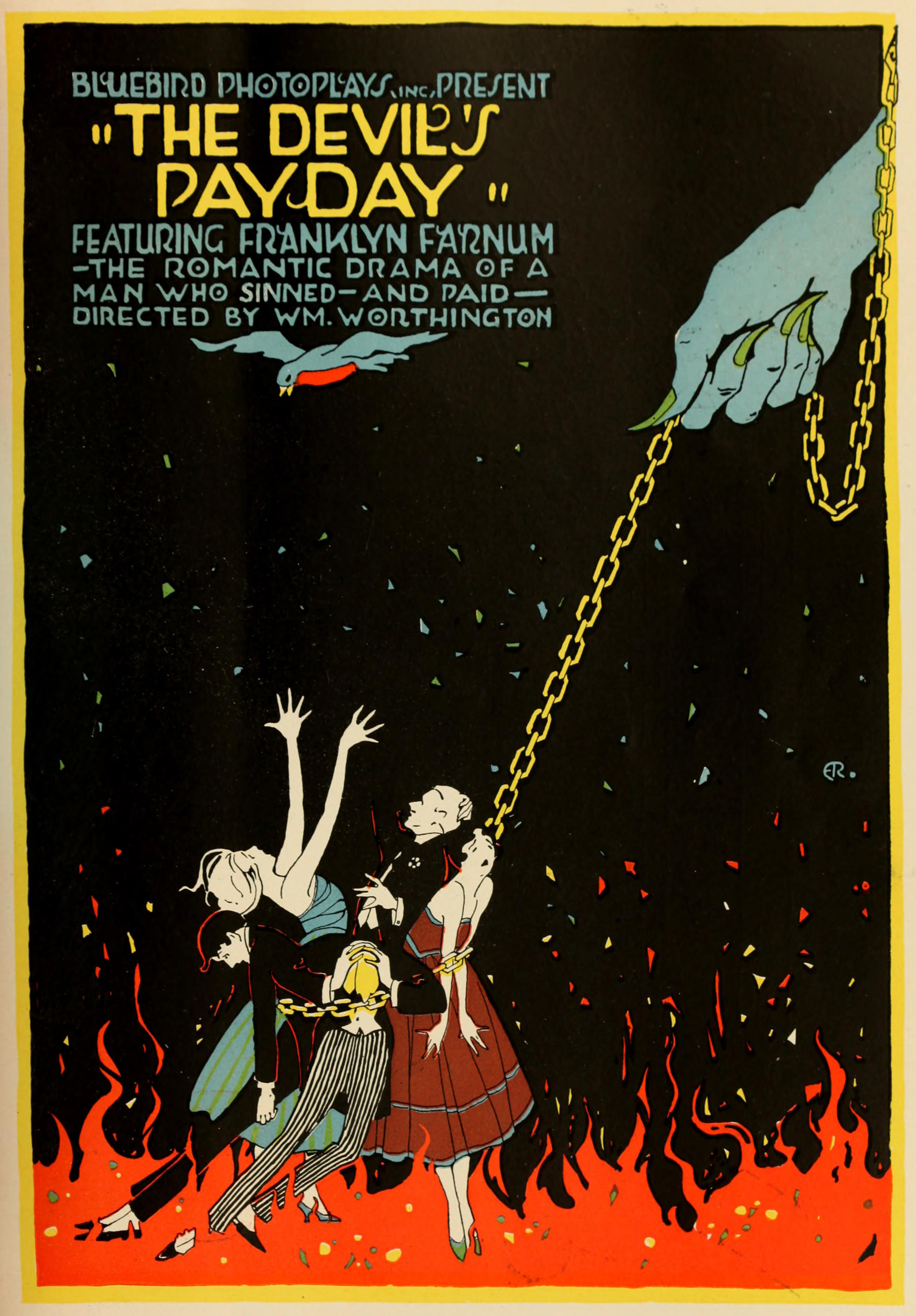
- Directed by: William Worthington
- Written by: George Hively (story); Fred Myton
- Starring: Franklyn Farnum; Leah Baird; Gertrude Astor
- Cinematography: Friend Baker
- Production company: Universal Pictures
- Distributed by: Universal Pictures
- Release date: January 29, 1917
- Running time: 50 minutes
- Country: United States
- Languages: Silent; English intertitles

The Devil's Pay Day is a 1917 American silent drama film directed by William Worthington and starring Franklyn Farnum, Leah Baird and Gertrude Astor.

== Cast ==
- Franklyn Farnum as Gregory Van Houten
- Leah Baird as Jean Haskins
- Gertrude Astor as Hazel Davidson
- Charles Perley as James Hanley
- Countess Du Cello as Mrs. Haskins
- Seymour Hastings as Mr. Haskins

== Bibliography ==
- Lowe, Denise. An Encyclopedic Dictionary of Women in Early American Films: 1895-1930. Routledge, 2014.
