= Gertrude Astor =

American actress (1887–1977)

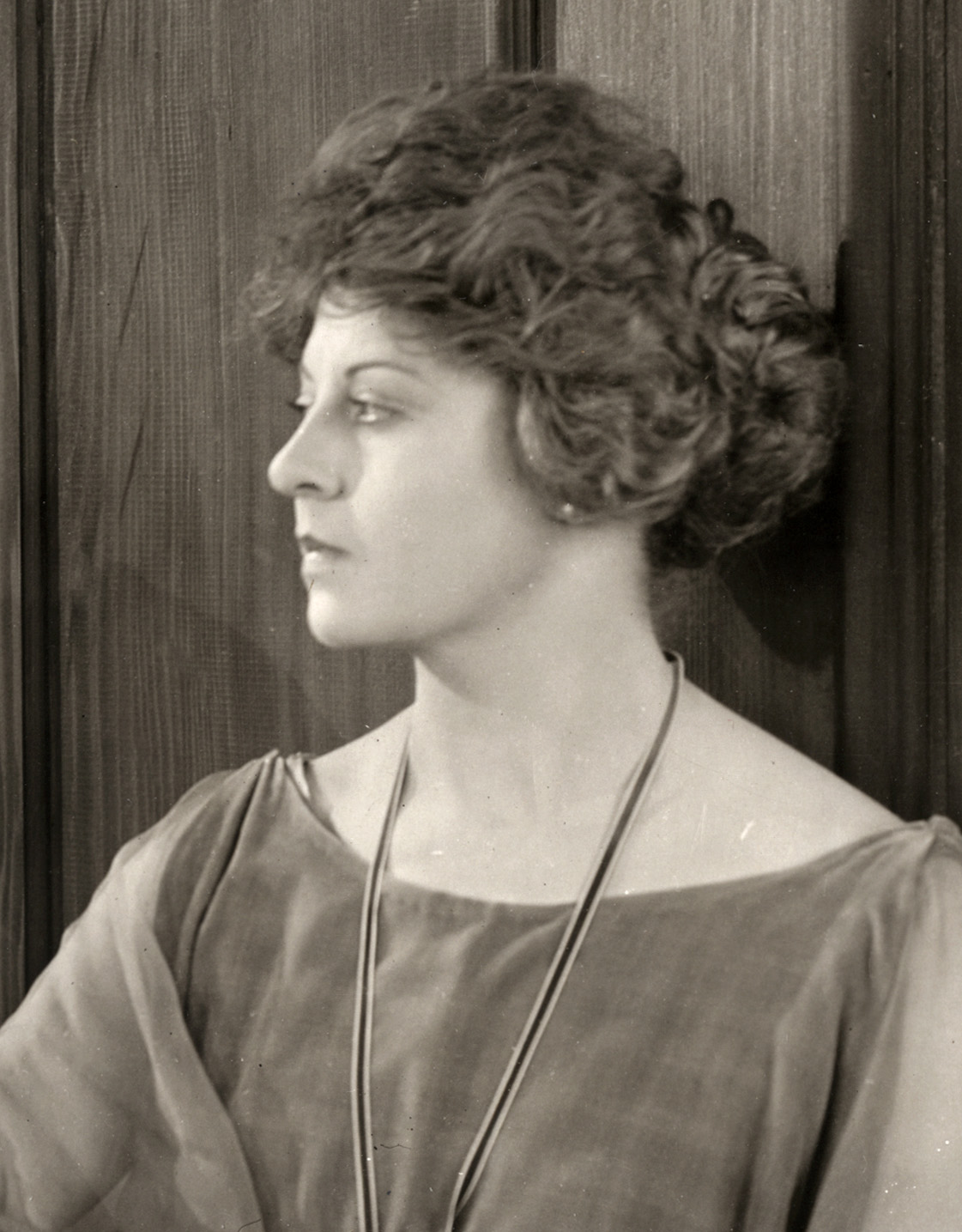
- Astor in Beyond the Rocks (1922)
- Born: Gertrude Irene Eyster; November 9, 1887; Lakewood, Ohio, U.S.
- Died: November 9, 1977 (aged 90); Woodland Hills, California, U.S.
- Resting place: Hollywood Forever Cemetery
- Occupation: Actress
- Years active: 1915–1966

Gertrude Astor (born Gertrude Irene Eyster; November 9, 1887 – November 9, 1977) was an American motion picture character actress, who began her career playing trombone in a woman's band.

== Early years ==
Astor was born on November 9, 1887, in Lakewood, Ohio. Her father was Glen Eyster, an assistant fire chief in Lima, Ohio.

== Career ==
Astor joined a woman's band as a trombone player and toured the states. In New York she left the band to obtain film work and got a job as an extra before her career took off.

In 1915, Astor gained a contract with Universal Studios. Between then and 1962, she appeared in over 250 movies. Her first known credit is in a Biograph short in 1915. She then became a contract player at Universal. A tall, angular and beautiful woman, Astor frequently towered over the leading men of the era; thus, she was frequently utilized in comedy roles as aristocrats, gold-diggers, and the "heroine's best pal".

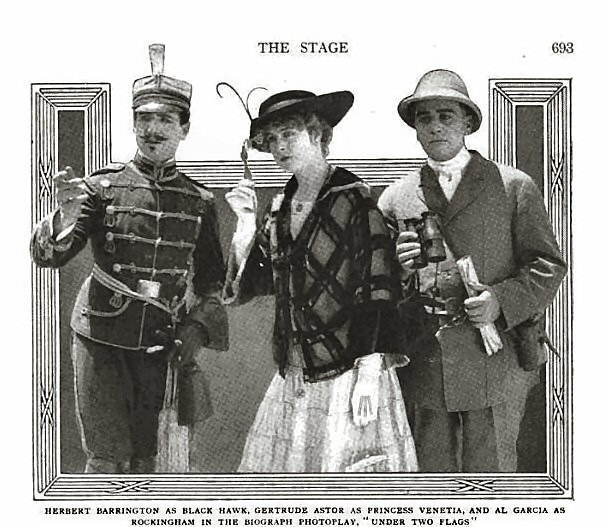
Gertrude Astor (center) with Herbert Barrington and Al Ernest Garcia

Her best-known silent appearances were as the visiting stage star in Stage Struck (1925) with Gloria Swanson, then as the vamp who plants stolen money on Harry Langdon in The Strong Man (1926), and as (Aunt Susan's) Flora Finch's niece, and later the traveling companion in The Cat and the Canary (1927).

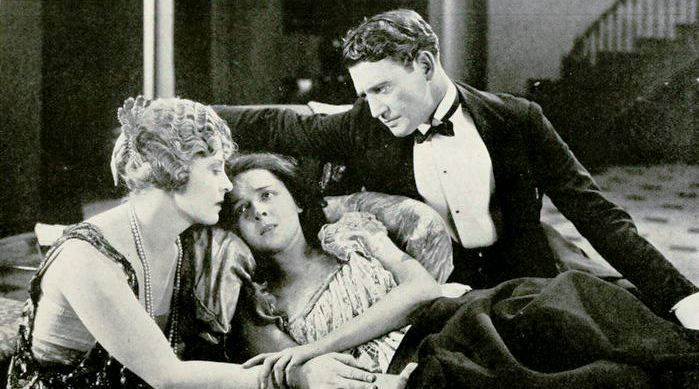
Gertrude Astor, Colleen Moore and Richard Dix filming The Wall Flower (1922)

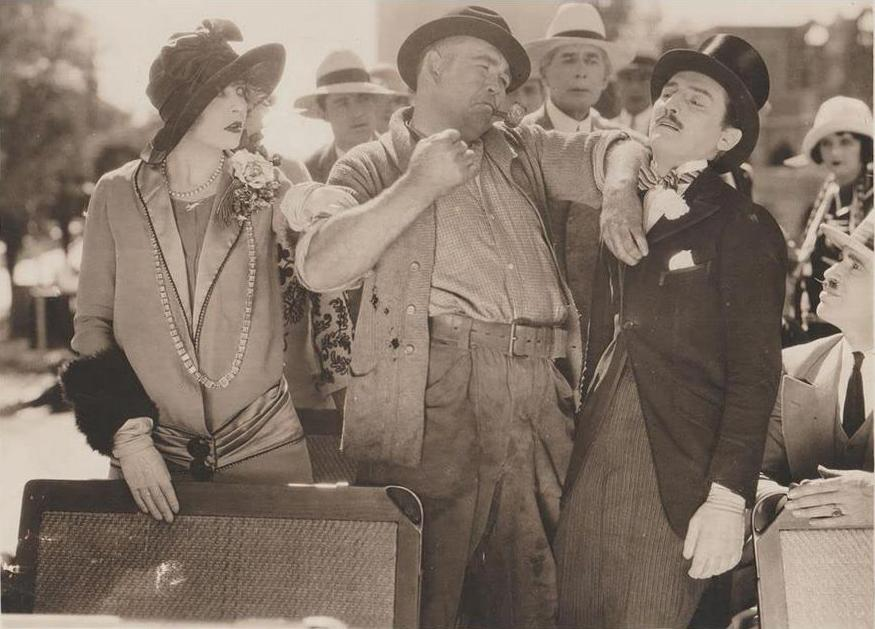
Gertrude Astor and Tyler Brooke in Laughing Ladies (1925 film)

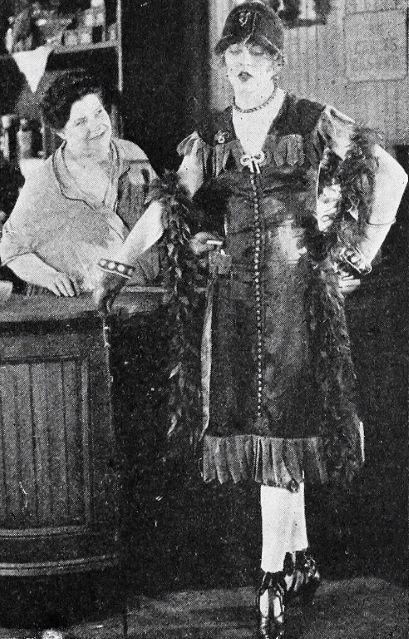
Carrie Scott and Gertrude Astor in the film Stage Struck (1925)

Astor performed at Hal Roach studios with such headliners as Laurel and Hardy, Our Gang, and especially Charley Chase. She also acted with Columbia Pictures' short subjects unit.

She continued to play bits in feature films throughout the 1940s, 1950s, and 1960s. She was briefly glimpsed as the first murder victim in the Sherlock Holmes adventure The Scarlet Claw and was among the ranks of dress extras in 1956's Around the World in Eighty Days. Her last appearance was in John Ford's The Man Who Shot Liberty Valance.

== Later years ==
In her later years, Astor was a welcome guest at several gatherings of the Laurel and Hardy fan club, The Sons of the Desert, and became an honorary member of the Way Out West tent.

== Death ==
Astor died on her 90th birthday in Woodland Hills, California, from a stroke. Her cremated remains were interred in the Abbey of Psalms at Hollywood Memorial Park.

== Selected filmography ==
- The Gray Ghost (1917)
- The Rescue (1917)
- Cheyenne's Pal (1917)
- The Devil's Pay Day (1917)
- Polly Redhead (1917)
- The Little Orphan (1917)
- Bucking Broadway (1917)
- The Lion's Claws (1918)
- The Brazen Beauty (1918)
- What Am I Bid? (1919)
- The Wicked Darling (1919)
- The Lion Man (1919)
- The Concert (1921)
- Through the Back Door (1921)
- Beyond the Rocks (1922)
- The Wall Flower (1922)
- The Impossible Mrs. Bellew (1922)
- The Ne'er-Do-Well (1923)
- Hollywood (1923) – cameo
- The Wanters (1923)
- Secrets (1924)
- The Silent Watcher (1924)
- Daring Love (1924)
- The Charmer (1925)
- Kentucky Pride (1925)
- Borrowed Finery (1925)
- Folly of Youth (1925)
- The Verdict (1925)
- Stage Struck (1925)
- Kiki (1926)
- Don Juan's Three Nights (1926)
- The Strong Man (1926)
- The Taxi Dancer (1927)
- The Cat and the Canary (1927)
- The Irresistible Lover (1927)
- Pretty Clothes (1927)
- Hit of the Show (1928)
- The Butter and Egg Man (1928)
- The Cohens and the Kellys in Paris (1928)
- Rose-Marie (1928)
- The Fatal Warning (1929)
- Frozen Justice (1929)
- Two Weeks Off (1929)
- The Fall of Eve (1929)
- Be Yourself (1930)
- Come Clean (1931)
- Hell Bound (1931)
- Western Limited (1932)
- Washee Ironee (1934)
- Northern Frontier (1935)
- Empty Saddles (1936)
- Tassels in the Air (1938)
- The Scarlet Claw (1944)
- Girls of the Big House (1945)
- 3 Godfathers (1948)
- Havana Rose (1951)
- Jet Job (1952)
- The Man Who Shot Liberty Valance (1962)
