= The Last Warning (1928 film) =

1928 film

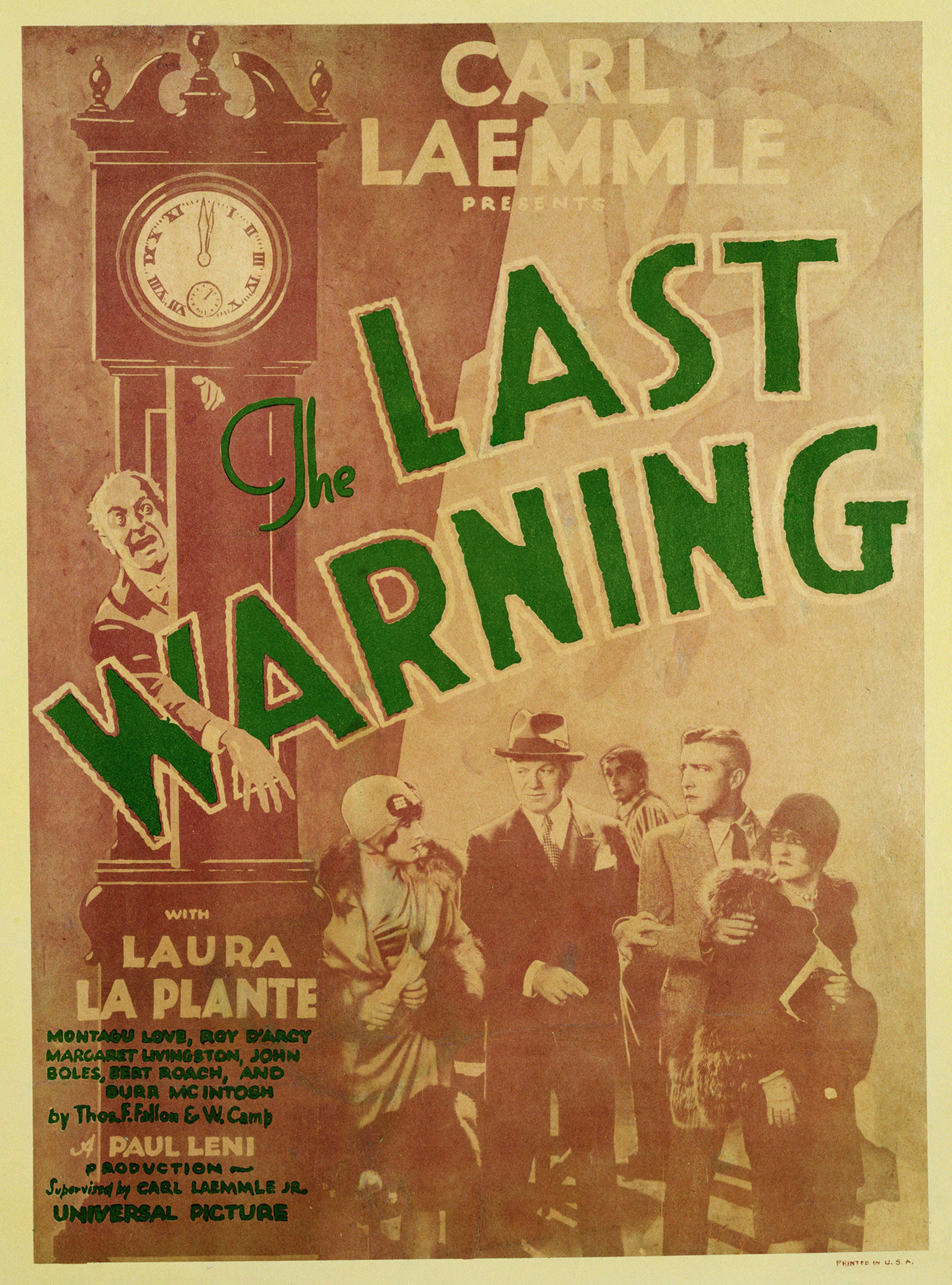
- Theatrical poster
- Directed by: Paul Leni
- Screenplay by: Alfred A. Cohn; Robert F. Hill; J. G. Hawks; Tom Reed (uncredited) (adaptation)
- Based on: from the play by Thomas F. Fallon and novel by Wadsworth Camp
- Produced by: Carl Laemmle Jr. (associate producer)
- Starring: Laura La Plante; Montagu Love; Roy D'Arcy; Margaret Livingston; John Boles; Bert Roach; Burr McIntosh
- Cinematography: Hal Mohr (uncredited)
- Edited by: Robert Carlisle (uncredited)
- Music by: Joseph Cherniavsky (uncredited)
- Production companies: Carl Laemmle presents A Paul Leni Production
- Distributed by: Universal Pictures Corp.
- Release date: December 25, 1928
- Running time: 87 minutes
- Country: United States
- Languages: Sound (Part-Talkie); English Intertitles

The Last Warning is a 1928 sound part-talkie American mystery film directed by Paul Leni, and starring Laura La Plante, Montagu Love, and Margaret Livingston. In addition to sequences with audible dialogue or talking sequences, the film features a synchronized musical score and sound effects along with English intertitles. The film apparently only survives in a cut-down edited silent version which was made for theaters that had not yet converted to sound. The soundtrack for the sound version, which was also released on sound-on-disc format, survives in private hands on Vitaphone type discs.

The Last Warning was also one of the very last part-talkie films Universal made, with roughly sixty feet of talking sequences added (only a minute or two). Its plot follows a New York producer's attempt to re-stage a play five years after one of the original cast members was murdered in the theater. The film is based on the 1922 Broadway melodrama of the same name by Thomas F. Fallon, which in turn was based on the story House of Fear by Wadsworth Camp, the father of the writer Madeleine L'Engle.

Conceived as a followup to Leni's wildly successful 1927 production The Cat and the Canary (also starring La Plante), the film was produced by Universal Pictures under Carl Laemmle. Principal photography took place in Los Angeles in the summer of 1928 on sets recycled from Universal's The Phantom of the Opera (1925). It premiered on Christmas Day 1928 before expanding in January 1929, and was released as both a part-sound film as well as a silent film, the silent is the only known extant version. It was the final film directed by Leni before his death from blood poisoning on September 2, 1929.

Response by critics to The Last Warning varied, with many praising its performances and cinematography, though several commented on its incoherent plot, and others criticized its integration of sound, feeling it presented optimally as a silent film. In 2016, Universal Pictures selected it for film restoration, using elements from two different prints owned by the Packard Humanities Institute and the Cinémathèque Française.

== Plot ==
The Last Warning

"BROADWAY, ELECTRIC HIGHWAY OF HAPPINESS.... STREET OF NIGHT CLUBS, THEATRES, LAUGHTER." In a Broadway theatre production of a play entitled The Snare, one of the actors, John Woodford, inexplicably dies during a stage performance, and his body disappears. Few clues exist as to what caused his death, aside from several drops of liquid found that resembled chloroform. Rumors of a love triangle between Woodford and two cast members circulate as a possible motive for his death.

Five years after the theater's closure, producer Arthur McHugh decides to solve the mystery by again staging the play with the remaining cast and re-enacting Woodford's murder. During rehearsals in the abandoned theater, strange occurrences plague the cast, including ominous noises, falling scenery, and an unexplained fire. Doris, the lead actress, has her purse stolen from her dressing room by an unseen assailant; Mike Brody, the stage manager, reportedly receives a telegram warning him to drop out of the play, signed by John Woodford, and the theater's new owner, Arthur McHugh, also receives a visit from Woodford's ghost.

The production continues, and during the final rehearsal, Harvey Carleton inexplicably disappears from the stage during a blackout. Doris spots a mysterious masked figure in a theater box in addition to a man resembling John Woodford, but both disappear. Behind a picture hanging on the stage, a lever is discovered which opens a trap door, where the cast find Harvey incoherent. Arthur and Richard Quayle, another cast member, venture inside, where they discover a tunnel that leads to Doris's dressing room.

Arthur has police officers appointed at the theater for the show's opening the following night. During the performance, an electrical wire charged to 400 volts is discovered connected to a candlestick onstage, and Arthur lunges at Richard to prevent him from touching it during the final scene. The unseen masked assailant is discovered hiding inside a grandfather clock onstage, but he drops through a trap door in the floor just after shooting one of the police officers. The assailant scales the theater and throws a mannequin resembling John Woodford onto the stage. He then begins swinging from a rope, but is brought back down by a stagehand who cuts it.

The masked assailant is discovered to be Brody, who caused Woodford's death via electrocution and had been behind the "hauntings" to prevent the theater from being used.

== Cast ==
- Laura La Plante as Doris Terry
- Montagu Love as Arthur McHugh
- Roy D'Arcy as Harvey Carleton
- Margaret Livingston as Evelynda Hendon
- John Boles as Richard Quayle
- Bert Roach as Mike Brody
- Mack Swain as Robert Bunce
- Burr McIntosh as Josiah Bunce
- Carrie Daumery as Barbara Morgan
- Slim Summerville as Tommy Wall
- 'Buddy' Phelps as 'Buddy'
- Torben Meyer as Gene
- D'Arcy Corrigan as John Woodford
- Tom O'Brien as First Detective
- Fred Kelsey as Second Detective

Uncredited

- Harry Northrup as coroner
- Charles K. French as doctor
- Pat Harmon as police officer

== Production ==
=== Screenplay and filming ===
The film was envisioned as a companion piece to director Leni's earlier The Cat and the Canary, due to that film's great popularity. Universal assigned Leni to the project under the assumption that his previous success would yield significant box-office results. It is based on the 1922 play of the same name by Thomas F. Fallon, which ran for 238 performances from October 24, 1922, until May 1923 at the Klaw Theatre. Fallon's play was in turn based on the story House of Fear by Wadsworth Camp, the father of writer Madeleine L'Engle.

=== Casting ===
Laura La Plante, a former teenage actress who had previously starred in Leni's The Cat and the Canary, was given top-billing in her role as Doris Terry, though her part in the film is considerably less involved than in the former. Film historian John Soister characterizes La Plante's role as that of an ingénue, consisting primarily of reactions to "assorted assaults, visions, and set-ups." The film marked La Plante's first talking picture. British actor Montagu Love was cast opposite La Plante, receiving second-billing. Soister notes that Love was "cast against type" for his role, that of "no-nonsense" theater owner Arthur McHugh.

Margaret Livingston, an actress who had also begun her career as a teenager, was cast in the role of actress Evalynda Hendon; her performance in the film helped earn her a role in Universal's The Charlatan, released later that year. In the role of Richard Quayle, Leni cast John Boles, who subsequently played second lead in Frankenstein (1931). Bert Roach was cast as Mike Brody, the stage manager who is unmasked at the climax. Barbara, an elderly character actress who starred in the original play in which Woodford was murdered, is portrayed by Belgian-American actress Carrie Daumery. This was Daumery's only film credit from the early sound era, and her role is likened by Soister and others to that of Flora Finch in The Cat and the Canary, but stripped of any comedic tone.

=== Filming ===
Principal photography began in August 1928. The theater set used in the film had originally been used in the 1925 The Phantom of the Opera starring Lon Chaney, and was located in Universal City, California.

== Release ==
According to the American Film Institute, The Last Warning had its theatrical debut in New York City on January 6, 1929. However, special advance screenings occurred on Christmas Day 1928 in several U.S. cities, including Chillicothe, Missouri, and Manhattan, Kansas.

The film was marketed as a successor to producer Leni's previous film The Cat and the Canary, attributed to producer Laemmle's "discriminating supervision." It is often considered one of the last part-talkies produced by Universal Studios. The film features a brief minute or two of synchronized dialogue, as well as screams, cries, and other sound effects. These scenes have since been lost. Few prints of the film exist in the United States: One is owned by the George Eastman House Motion Picture Collection in Rochester, New York, which was originally owned by the Cinémathèque Française, and is slightly edited and entirely silent with French-language intertitles.

=== Critical response ===
Contemporaneous

Though it re-teamed Leni with The Cat and the Canary star Laura La Plante and features a similar style, The Last Warning lacks the supernatural elements of The Cat and the Canary and is therefore usually considered in the mystery genre rather than the horror genre; some historians, however, have classed it as a horror film. Elements of comedy present in Leni's The Cat and the Canary are also absent from the film. Extant published reviews of the film were varied.

Mordaunt Hall of The New York Times noted the film contained "some finely directed passages," but that it was "not especially disturbing." Martin Dickstein of the Brooklyn Daily Eagle described the film as being "related with such vagueness that the picture fail[s] to hold together," but praised Leni's "propitious use of 'the camera angle,' and it is through this inventive maneuvering of the lens that the picture achieves at least a visual significance." A critic from the Los Angeles Times similarly found the cinematography "highly interesting" and the plot "lost in a maze of double and triple exposures," adding that there "is a decided lack of spontaneity in the sound sequences."

The majority of the criticism surrounding the film had to do with its integration of sound. Irene Thirer of the New York Daily News, who felt the film "should never have been a talkie," elaborating that the dialogue episodes "retard the action" and "are not well done." The Montana Standard noted that the film "presents many thrills" and was widely enjoyed by the audiences at the film's premiere in Butte. A critic from the Hartford Courant alternately felt that, "as a talking picture, the film retains all the chill values of the play, with its eerie noises, screams, fright-fraught dialogue and general noise and excitement," but conceded that "it decidedly is not the scary kind of mystery play that the average person would find too startling." Sid Silverman, writing for Variety, noted the use of sound effects as "multiple, continuous, and in detail," and that the film included "enough screams to stimulate the average film mob into sticking through it." Hall also criticized the film's use of sound, writing: "There are too many outbursts of shrieking, merely to prove the effect of the audible screen, to cause any spine-chilling among those watching this production."

The Chillicothe Constitution-Tribune noted that The Last Warning "the most thrilling mystery film released this season," while the Billings Gazette deemed it "the greatest mystery picture ever filmed." Photoplay was less laudatory, noting: "This could have been a gorgeous mystery story, but it's an obvious cross between The Phantom of the Opera and The Terror, with none of their consistency or power."

Retrospective

In a retrospective assessment, author and film critic Leonard Maltin awarded the film two and a half out of four stars, commending its camerawork and direction, but criticizing the film's story as "silly." Commenting on the finale, film historian Graham Petrie notes that Leni and cinematographer Hal Mohr "handle the camera with the utmost possible freedom, culminating in a scene in which the camera swings on a rope with the villain from one part of the theater to another. Along the way, Leni revels in the shadows, cobwebs, tilted angles, subtly distorted perspectives, ominously confined spaces, and clutching hands that had by now become his trademark." Petrie, who classifies it as a thriller film rather than a mystery, emphasizes that its stylistic and visual elements supersede narrative plausibility and characterization.

=== 2016 restoration ===
In 2016, a print of the cut-down edited silent version underwent digital film restoration by Universal Pictures, sourced from both the Cinémathèque Française print, as well as another print of the edited silent version featuring the original English title cards owned by the Packard Humanities Institute Collection of the UCLA Film & Television Archive. Additional footage that was featured in the original sound version is now believed to be lost. The restored print was screened at the Castro Theatre as part of the San Francisco Silent Film Festival on June 4, 2016. It was again screened in September 2016 at Cinecon Classic Film Festival in Los Angeles. This restored edition of the film had its home media premiere in a Blu-ray and DVD combination set by Flicker Alley in 2019.

== Other adaptations ==
The Last Warning was re-made in 1939 by Joe May under the title The House of Fear. Universal made another movie titled The Last Warning in 1938, but it has no connection to the Leni film.

== See also ==
- List of early sound feature films (1926–1929)

== Bibliography ==
- Conrich, Ian (2004). "Before Sound: Universal, Silent Cinema, and the Last of the Horror-Spectaculars". In Price, Stephen (ed.). The Horror Film. Rutgers, New Jersey: Rutgers University Press. pp. 40–57. ISBN 978-0-813-53363-6.
- Maltin, Leonard; Green, Spencer; Edelman, Rob (2010). Leonard Maltin's Classic Movie Guide. New York: Plume. ISBN 978-0-452-29577-3.
- McCaffrey, Donald (1999). Guide to the Silent Years of American Cinema. Reference Guides to the World's Cinema. Santa Barbara, California: Greenwood Publishing Group. ISBN 978-0-313-30345-6.
- Petrie, Graham (2002). Hollywood Destinies: European Directors in America, 1922-1931 (Revised ed.). Detroit, Michigan: Wayne State University Press. ISBN 978-0-814-32958-0.
- Soister, John T. (2001). Of Gods and Monsters: A Critical Guide to Universal Studios' Science Fiction. McFarland. ISBN 978-0-786-40454-4.
- Soister, John T.; Nicolella, Henry; Joyce, Steve (2014). American Silent Horror, Science Fiction and Fantasy Feature Films, 1913–1929. Jefferson, North Carolina: McFarland. ISBN 978-0-786-48790-5.
