= Humphrey Bogart on stage, screen, radio, and television =

Cataloging of performances by Humphrey Bogart

Humphrey Bogart filmography
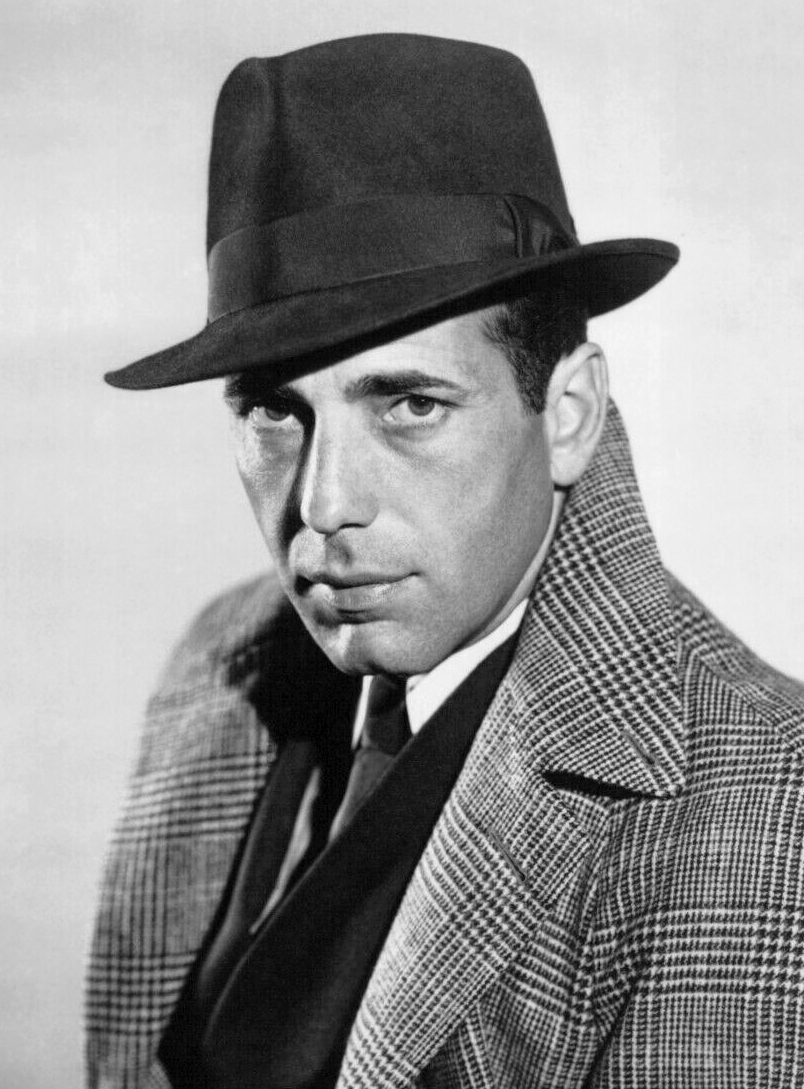
- Humphrey Bogart c. 1937
- Film: 75+
- Radio show: 12+

Humphrey Bogart (1899–1957) was an American actor and producer whose 36-year career began with live stage productions in New York in 1920. He had been born into an affluent family in New York's Upper West Side, the first-born child and only son of illustrator Maud Humphrey and physician Belmont DeForest Bogart. The family eventually came to include his sisters Patricia and Catherine. His parents believed he would excel academically, possibly matriculate at Yale University and become a surgeon. They enrolled him in the private schools of Delancey, Trinity, and Phillips Academy, but Bogart was not inclined as a scholar and never completed his studies at Phillips, joining the United States Navy in 1918.

On the completion of his military service, Bogart began working in theatrical productions. He was initially employed as a manager behind the scenes for the plays Experience and The Ruined Lady, before trying his talents on stage in the 1922 play Drifting. A recurring legend about Bogart is that his dialog in the 1925 play Hell's Bells was "Tennis anyone?", but Bogart denied it, saying his line was, "It's forty-love outside. Anyone care to watch?" His body of stage work included more than a dozen plays, and lasted a little over a decade. He began to pursue a career in film by 1928, first appearing in the short film The Dancing Town, and then in the 1930 short film Broadway's Like That. Bogart appeared in 75 feature films, and initially believed he was on the road to stardom when he secured a 1929 contract with Fox Film. The resulting productions of A Devil with Women, Up the River, Body and Soul, Women of All Nations and A Holy Terror for Fox, as well as Bad Sister for Universal Pictures, were collectively a disappointment to him, and he returned to stage work in New York.

Bogart's break-out role was that of escaped murderer Duke Mantee whom he played in 197 performances of the 1935 Broadway theatre production of The Petrified Forest, with actor Leslie Howard in the lead. The play, and his subsequent casting in the movie version, propelled him to stardom, and secured him a movie contract with Warner Bros. He made 48 films for them, including The Maltese Falcon, To Have and Have Not, Key Largo, and Casablanca, the last of which earned Bogart his first nomination for an Academy Award for Best Actor. Bogart won the award on his second nomination, for his 1951 performance in the United Artists production The African Queen. His third Oscar nomination was for his performance in the 1954 Columbia Pictures production The Caine Mutiny. In addition to his film work, Bogart guest-starred in numerous radio and television programs, primarily reprising his film roles. He formed Santana Productions in 1948; the company's 1950 production of In a Lonely Place was chosen by the National Film Registry in 2007 for permanent preservation as "culturally, historically or aesthetically" significant. Santana Productions also created the 1951–1952 Bold Venture half-hour radio series as a vehicle for Bogart and his wife Lauren Bacall. He died of cancer in early 1957 at age 57.

== Broadway theatre (1920–1935) ==
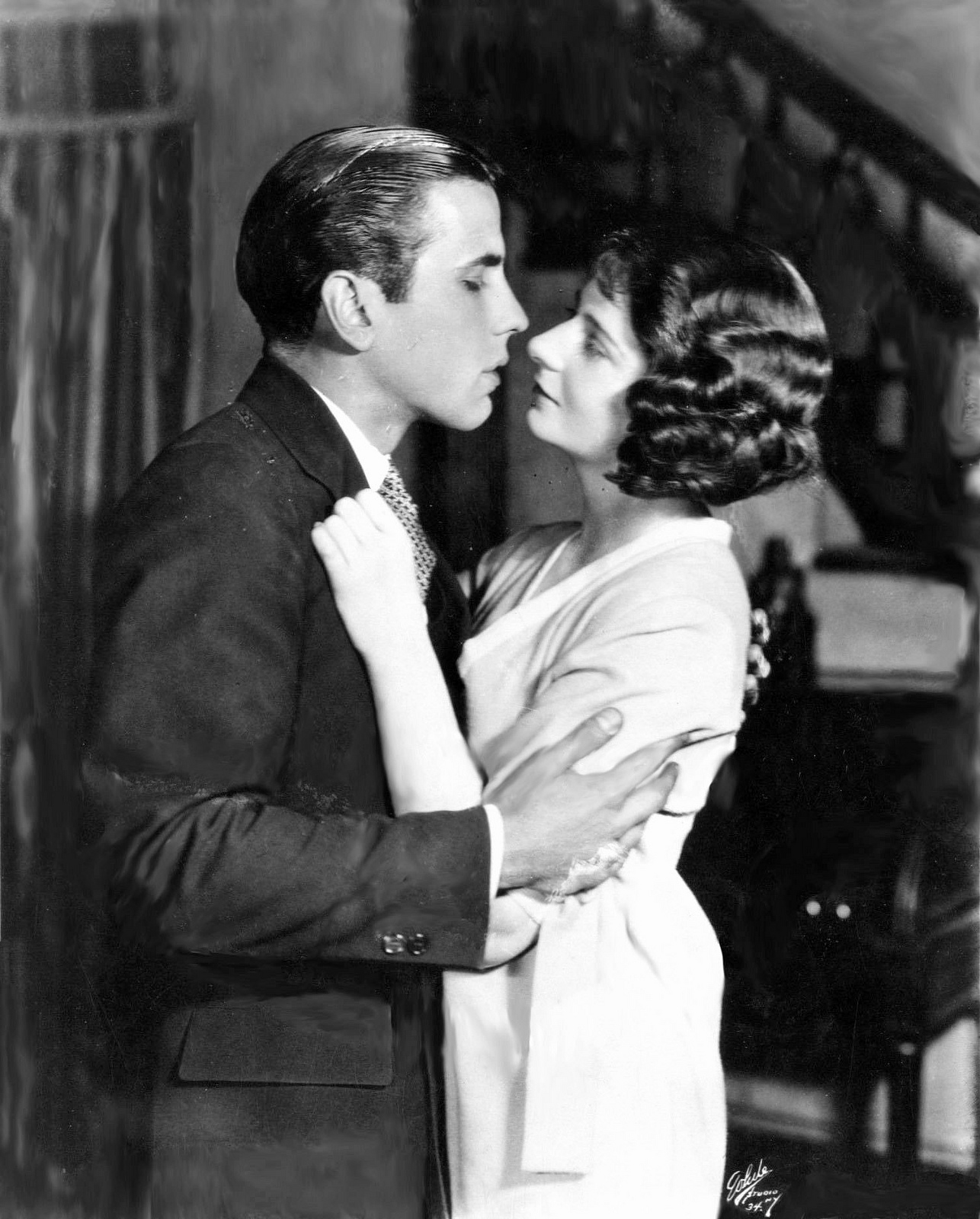
Bogart and Shirley Booth in Hell's Bells, 1925

After Bogart completed his World War I service with the United States Navy, he found theatrical employment in New York. He stage-managed the 1920 play Experience, and later became a road manager for The Ruined Lady. When he began to pursue an acting career, his debut role was in the 1922 play Drifting.

He appeared in 18 productions on Broadway, including the role that would propel him to fame and success in the movie industry; from January through June 1935, he appeared in 197 performances of The Petrified Forest as Duke Mantee, a murderer fleeing across the Arizona-Mexico border to evade capture by law enforcement. Leslie Howard appeared in the lead role as intellectual idealist Alan Squier. With the exception of The Petrified Forest, the sources do not indicate whether or not Bogart was in the entire run of any production.

Broadway theatre credits of Humphrey Bogart
Title	Year	Role	Theatre	Notes	Ref.
Drifting	1922	Multiple roles	Playhouse Theatre		
Swifty	1922	Tom Proctor	Playhouse Theatre		
Meet the Wife	1923	Gregory Brown	Klaw Theatre		
Nerves	1924	Bob Thatch	Comedy Theatre		
Hell's Bells	1925	Jimmy Todhunter	Wallack's Theatre		
Cradle Snatchers	1925	Jose Vallejo	Music Box Theatre		
Baby Mine	1927	Alfred Hardy	Chanin's 46th Street Theatre		
Saturday's Children	1927	Rims O'Neil	Booth Theatre		
Saturday's Children	1928	Rims O'Neil	Forrest Theatre		
Skyrocket	1929	Vic. Ewing	Lyceum Theatre		
It's a Wise Child	1929–1930	Roger Baldwin	Belasco Theatre		
After All	1931	Duff Wilson	Booth Theatre		
I loved you Wednesday	1932	Randall Williams	Sam H. Harris Theatre		
Chrysalis	1932	Don Ellis	Martin Beck Theatre		
Our Wife	1933	Jerry Marvin	Booth Theatre		
The Mask and the Face	1933	Luciano Spina	Guild Theatre		
Invitation to a Murder	1934	Horatio Channing	Theatre Masque		
The Petrified Forest	1935	Duke Mantee	Broadhurst Theatre	197 performances, with Leslie Howard in the lead role of Alan Squier	

== Short films (1928–1930) ==
Bogart always believed that the future of his profession was ultimately in the burgeoning film industry. After signing with Charles Frohman Productions, he was cast as the male lead opposite stage actress Helen Hayes in a two-reel silent The Dancing Town (1928) for Paramount Pictures. He appeared in a Vitaphone short musical Broadway's Like That (1930), which also featured Joan Blondell and Ruth Etting.

Film short credits of Humphrey Bogart
Title	Year	Role	Notes	Ref.
The Dancing Town	1928	Man in Doorway at Dance	Paramount Pictures	
Broadway's Like That	1930	Ruth's Fiancé	Soundtrack lost Vitaphone	

== Feature-length films (1930–1956) ==
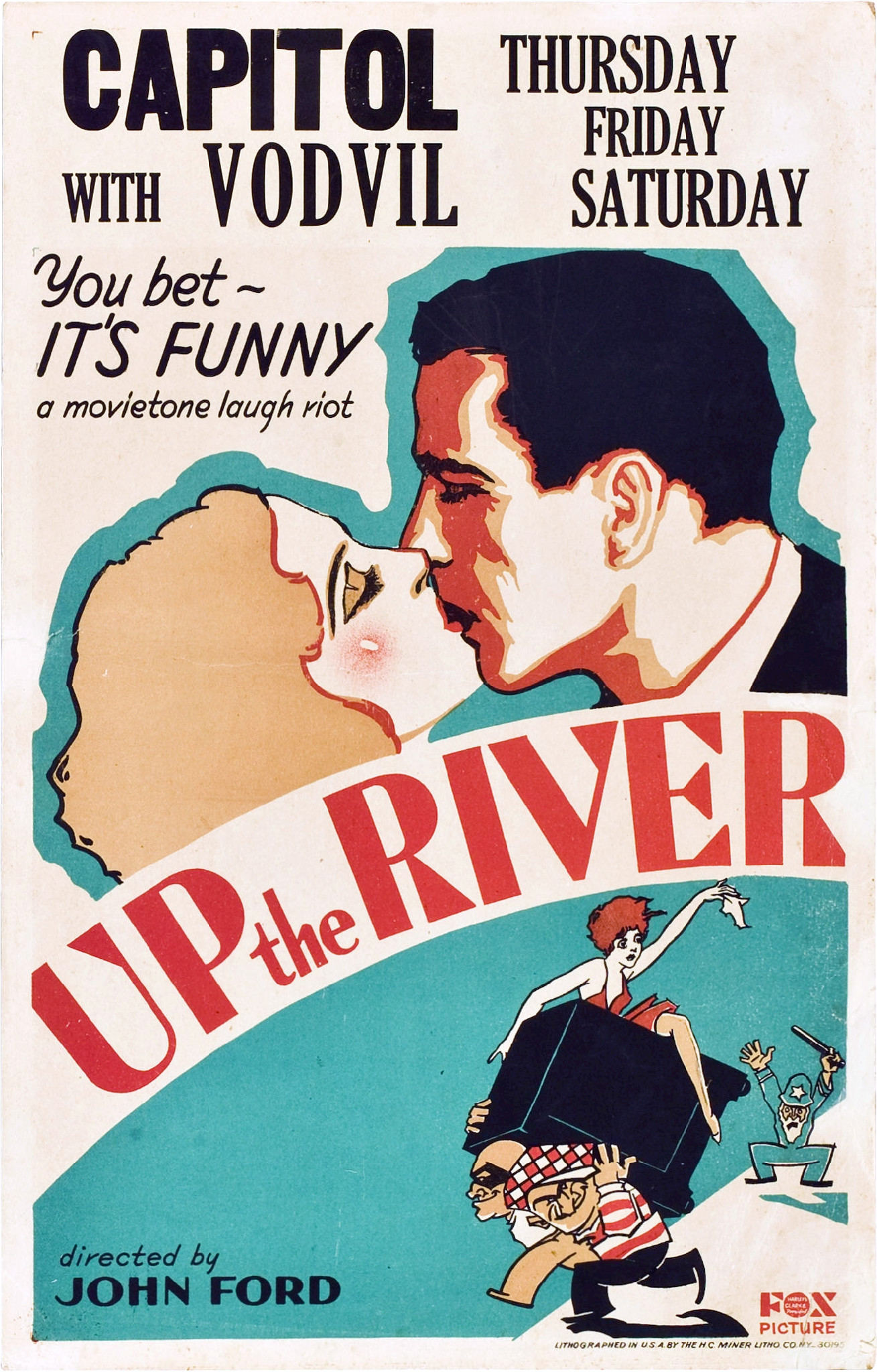
Claire Luce and Bogart in John Ford's Up the River (1930)

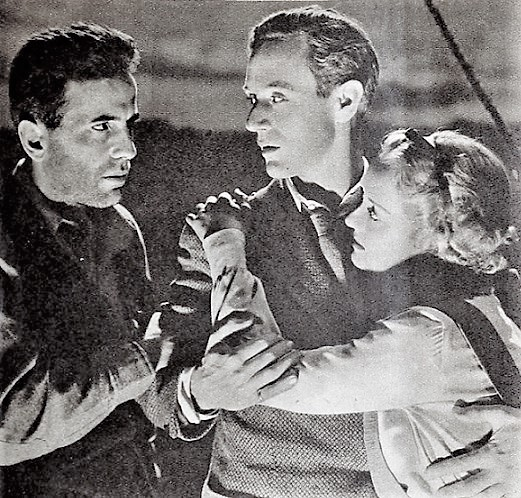
Bogart, Leslie Howard and Bette Davis, in The Petrified Forest, 1936

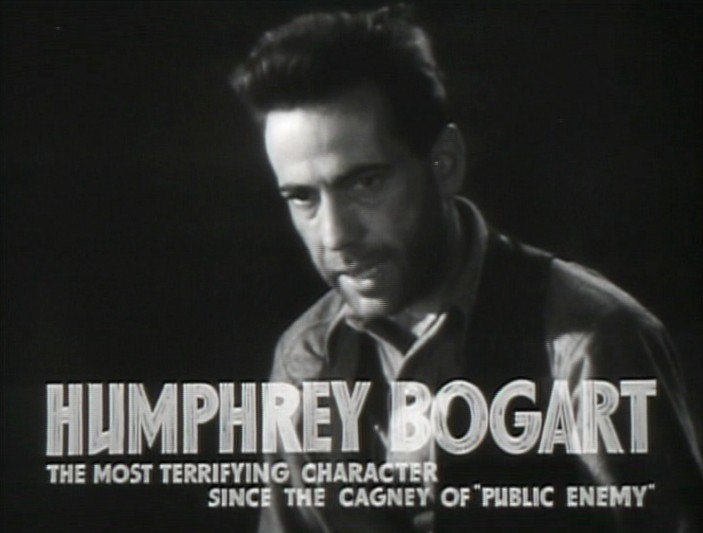
The Petrified Forest trailer (1936)

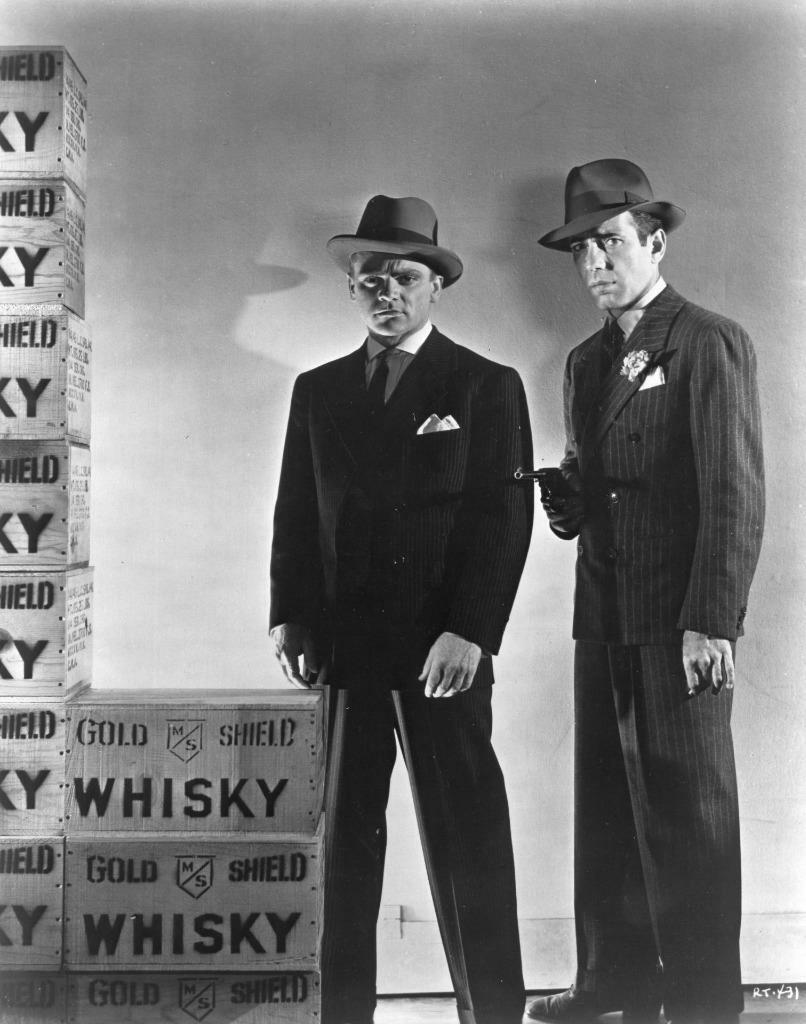
James Cagney and Bogart in The Roaring Twenties (1939)

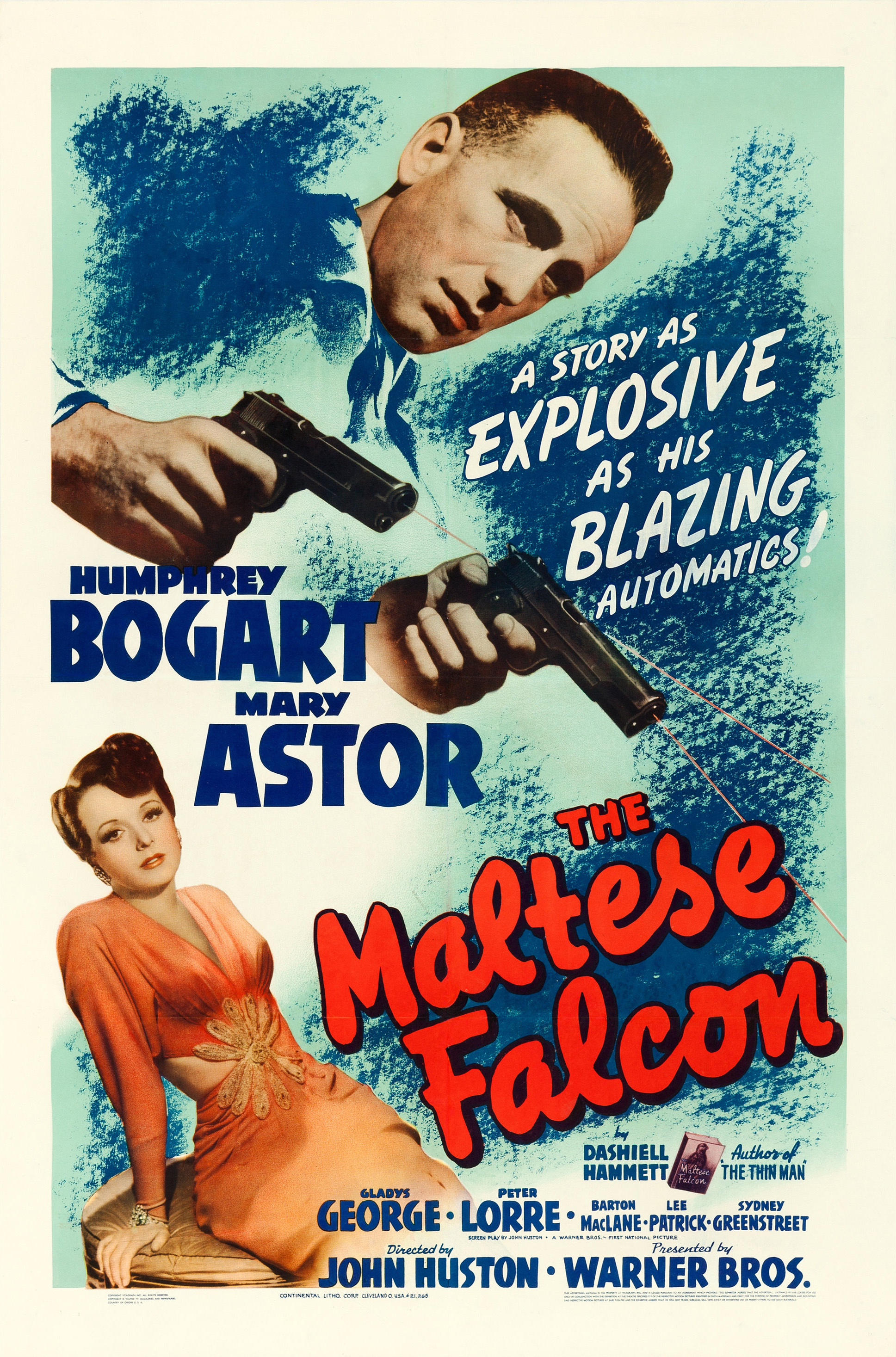
The Maltese Falcon (1941 film poster)

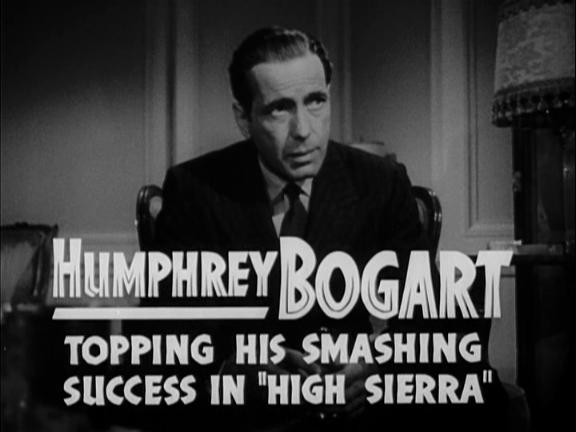
Bogart as Sam Spade in the trailer for The Maltese Falcon

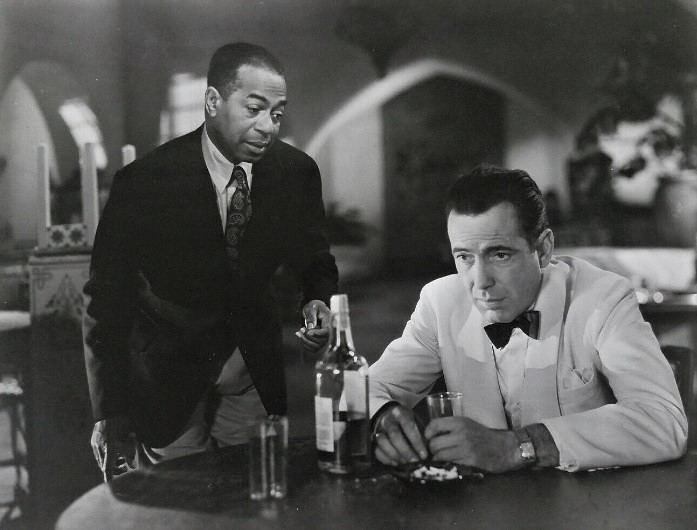
Dooley Wilson and Bogart in Casablanca (1942)

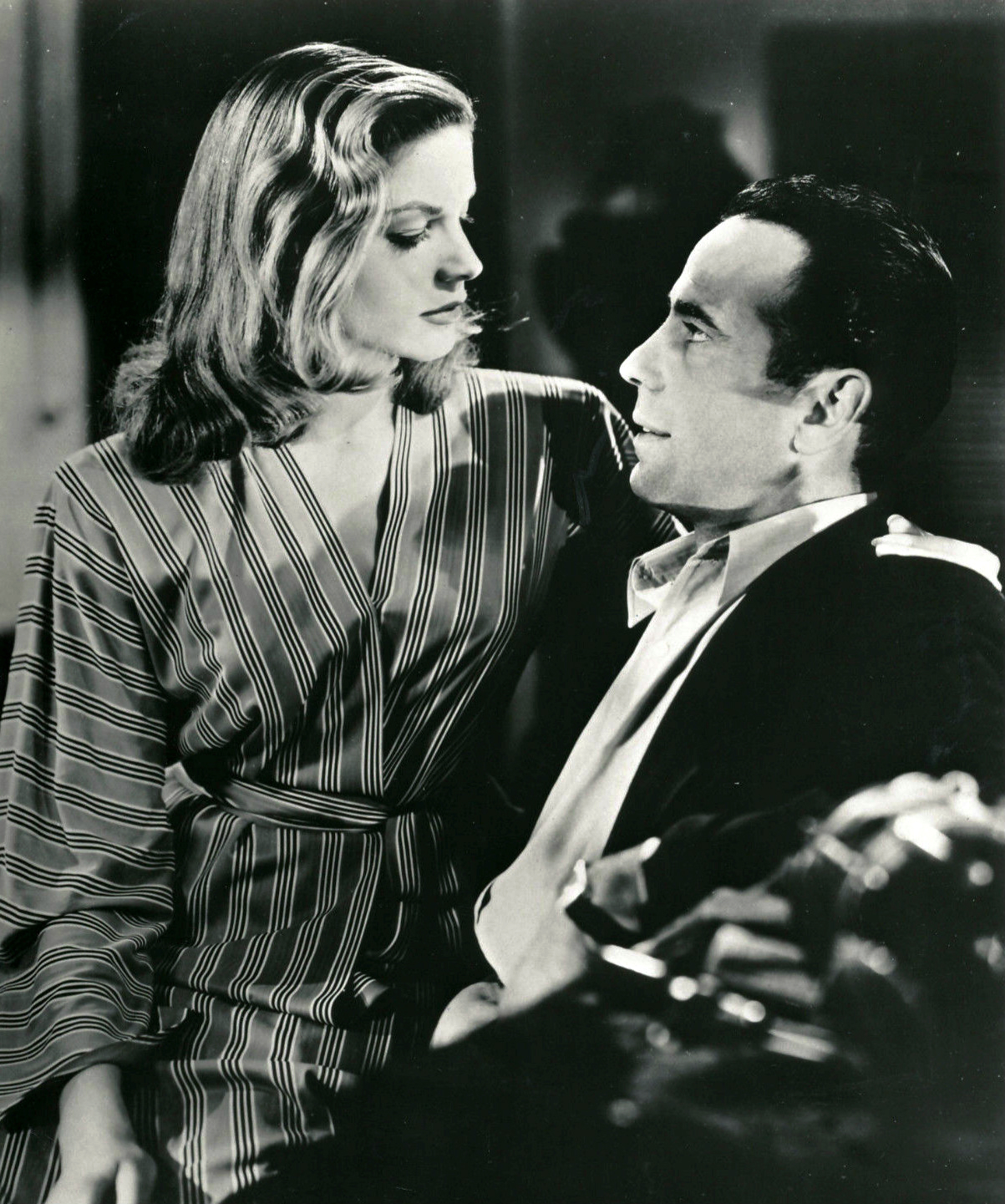
Bacall and Bogart in To Have and Have Not (1944)

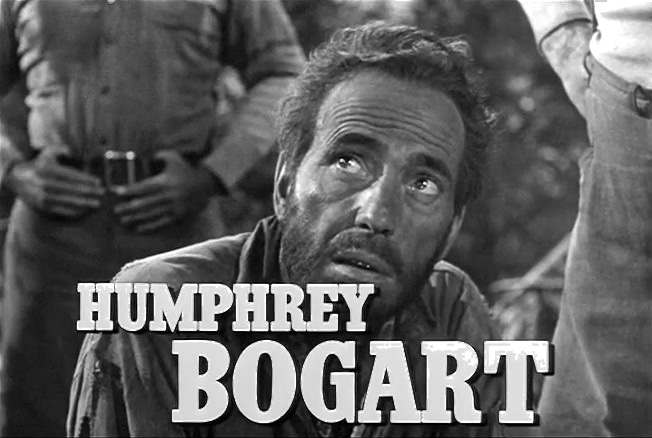
Bogart in The Treasure of the Sierra Madre (1948) trailer

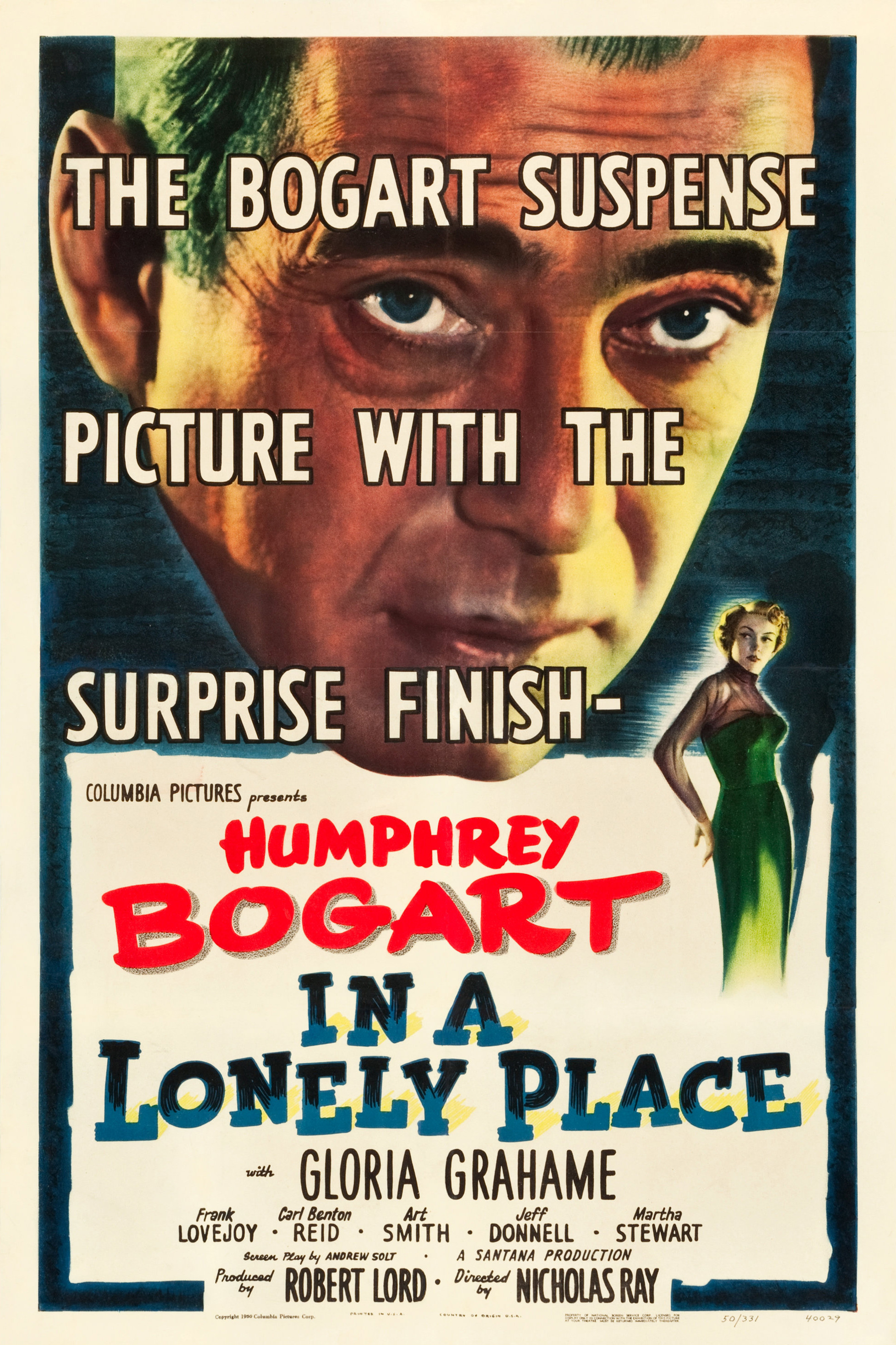
In a Lonely Place (1950 poster)

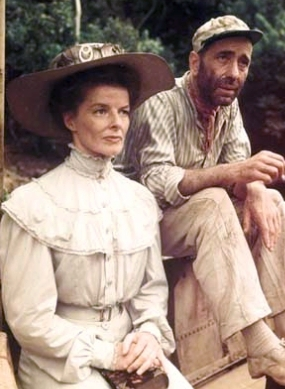
Katharine Hepburn and Humphrey Bogart in The African Queen (1951)

He made 75 feature-length films during his career. Two serendipitous events helped pave a path for his career ambitions. During the last half of the 1920s, the film industry's transition from the silent era to sound shifted focus towards stage actors whose vocal talents had been honed in front of live audiences. When the 1929 stock market crash triggered the Great Depression in the United States, funding for stage shows became precarious. Bogart's brother-in-law, Stuart Rose, had become an employee of Fox Film, and was able to arrange a screen test for him with Fox executive Al Lewis. After viewing the test, the Hollywood home office of Fox sent Lewis a directive that Bogart was to be signed to a $750 per week contract, with an option of raising it to $1,000 per week if he performed as expected:

I'm going to become the biggest movie star Hollywood's ever seen.

— Humphrey Bogart after signing his Fox contract in 1929

The films made in Hollywood under his Fox contract were Up the River (1930), A Devil with Women (1930), A Holy Terror (1931), Body and Soul (1931), and Women of All Nations (1931; all Bogart's scenes were cut). While still in California, he also made Bad Sister (1931) for Universal Pictures. Bogart was less than impressed with the end products, and returned to his stage career in New York.

When Warner Bros. purchased the film rights for The Petrified Forest, the studio retained Leslie Howard in the lead role he had performed on Broadway, but replaced Bogart with Edward G. Robinson in the role of Mantee. Howard intervened on Bogart's behalf to reclaim the role for him. Following the success of Bogart's performance in the 1936 film, Jack L. Warner put him under contract for $550 a week, with a morals clause, and financial options which could potentially more than triple Bogart's weekly salary.

He continued to appear in feature films for the rest of his life, and claimed that "at Warner Bros. in the 30s, I became a one-man film factory." He made 48 films for Warner Bros. (including First National Pictures, which Warner Bros. owned at that time), more than any other studio he was affiliated with. His body of work there included some of his most acclaimed films: Dark Victory (1939), High Sierra (1941), The Maltese Falcon (1941), Casablanca (1942), To Have and Have Not (1944), The Big Sleep (1946), The Treasure of the Sierra Madre (1948) and Key Largo (1948). By comparison, he only made seven films with Fox, five films each with Columbia Pictures and his own Santana Productions, three films for Paramount Pictures, two for United Artists, and one each for United States Pictures, Universal Pictures, Samuel Goldwyn Productions, MGM and Walter Wanger Productions.

Bogart created Santana Productions in 1948. The company produced Knock on Any Door (1949), Tokyo Joe (1949), And Baby Makes Three (1949) starring Robert Young and Barbara Hale, Sirocco (1951), The Family Secret (1951) starring John Derek and Lee J. Cobb, and Beat the Devil (1951), Bogart's spoof of The Maltese Falcon. The company's production of In a Lonely Place (1950) was added to the National Film Registry in 2007, "to be preserved for all time". Inclusion of films in the registry are based on their "culturally, historically or aesthetically" significant quality.

=== List of feature films ===
Feature-length films of Humphrey Bogart
Title	Year	Director	Role	Notes	Ref.
A Devil with Women	1930	Irving Cummings	Tom Standish	Fox Film	
Up the River	1930	John Ford	Steve Jordan	Fox Film	
Bad Sister	1931	Hobart Henley	Valentine Corliss	Universal Pictures distributed through Warner Bros.	
A Holy Terror	1931	Irving Cummings	Steve Nash	Fox Film	
Body and Soul	1931	Alfred Santell	Jim Watson	Fox Film	
Women of All Nations	1931	Raoul Walsh	Stone (Deleted scenes)	Fox Film	
Big City Blues	1932	Mervyn LeRoy	Shep Adkins	Warner Bros.	
Three on a Match	1932	Mervyn LeRoy	Harve	Warner Bros.	
Love Affair	1932	Thornton Freeland	Jim Leonard	Columbia Pictures	
Midnight	1934	Chester Erskine	Gar Boni	aka Call It Murder, Universal Pictures	
The Petrified Forest	1936	Archie Mayo	Duke Mantee	Warner Bros.	
Bullets or Ballots	1936	William Keighley	Nick "Bugs" Fenner	Warner Bros.	
Two Against the World	1936	William C. McGann	Sherry Scott	aka One Fatal Hour, Warner Bros.	
China Clipper	1936	Ray Enright	Hap Stuart	Warner Bros.	
Isle of Fury	1936	Frank McDonald	Valentine "Val" Stevens	Warner Bros.	
Black Legion	1937	Archie Mayo; Michael Curtiz (uncredited)	Frank Taylor	Warner Bros.	
The Great O'Malley	1937	William Dieterle	John Phillips	Warner Bros.	
Marked Woman	1937	Lloyd Bacon; Michael Curtiz (uncredited)	District Attorney David Graham	Warner Bros.	
San Quentin	1937	Lloyd Bacon	Joe "Red" Kennedy	Warner Bros.	
Kid Galahad	1937	Michael Curtiz	Turkey Morgan	Warner Bros.	
Dead End	1937	William Wyler	Hugh "Baby Face" Martin	Samuel Goldwyn Productions	
Stand-In	1937	Tay Garnett	Doug Quintain	Walter Wanger Productions	
Swing Your Lady	1938	Ray Enright	Ed Hatch	Warner Bros.	
Crime School	1938	Lewis Seiler	Deputy Commissioner Mark Braden	Warner Bros.	
Men Are Such Fools	1938	Busby Berkeley	Harry Galleon	Warner Bros.	
Racket Busters	1938	Lloyd Bacon	Pete "Czar" Martin	Warner Bros.	
The Amazing Dr. Clitterhouse	1938	Anatole Litvak	"Rocks" Valentine	Warner Bros.	
Angels with Dirty Faces	1938	Michael Curtiz	James Frazier	Warner Bros.	
King of the Underworld	1939	Lewis Seiler	Joe Gurney	Warner Bros.	
The Oklahoma Kid	1939	Lloyd Bacon	Whip McCord	Warner Bros.	
You Can't Get Away with Murder	1939	Lewis Seiler	Frank Wilson	Warner Bros.	
Dark Victory	1939	Edmund Goulding	Michael O'Leary	Warner Bros.	
The Roaring Twenties	1939	Raoul Walsh	George Hally	Warner Bros.	
The Return of Doctor X	1939	Vincent Sherman	Dr. Maurice Xavier, aka Marshall Quesne	Warner Bros.	
Invisible Stripes	1939	Lloyd Bacon	Chuck Martin	Warner Bros.	
They Drive by Night	1940	Raoul Walsh	Paul Fabrini	Warner Bros.	
Virginia City	1940	Michael Curtiz	John Murrell	Warner Bros.	
It All Came True	1940	Lewis Seiler	Grasselli aka Chips Maguire	Warner Bros.	
Brother Orchid	1940	Lloyd Bacon	Jack Buck	Warner Bros.	
High Sierra	1941	Raoul Walsh	Roy Earle	Warner Bros.	
The Wagons Roll at Night	1941	Ray Enright	Nick Coster	Warner Bros.	
The Maltese Falcon	1941	John Huston	Sam Spade	First film appearance of Sydney Greenstreet, Warner Bros.	
All Through the Night	1942	Vincent Sherman	Alfred 'Gloves' Donahue	Warner Bros.	
The Big Shot	1942	Lewis Seiler	Joseph "Duke" Berne	Warner Bros.	
Across the Pacific	1942	John Huston	Rick Leland	Warner Bros.	
Casablanca	1942	Michael Curtiz	Rick Blaine	Nominated for Best Actor Oscar, Warner Bros.	
Action in the North Atlantic	1943	Lloyd Bacon; Raoul Walsh (uncredited), Byron Haskin (uncredited)	Lt. Joe Rossi	Warner Bros.	
Sahara	1943	Zoltan Korda	Sgt. Joe Gunn	Columbia Pictures	
Thank Your Lucky Stars	1943	David Butler	Himself	Warner Bros.	
Passage to Marseille	1944	Michael Curtiz	Jean Matrac	Warner Bros.	
To Have and Have Not	1944	Howard Hawks	Harry "Steve" Morgan	Lauren Bacall's debut film, Warner Bros.	
Conflict	1945	Curtis Bernhardt	Richard Mason	Warner Bros.	
The Big Sleep	1946	Howard Hawks	Philip Marlowe	Warner Bros.	
Dead Reckoning	1947	John Cromwell	Capt. Warren "Rip" Murdock	Columbia Pictures	
The Two Mrs. Carrolls	1947	Peter Godfrey	Geoffrey Carroll	Warner Bros.	
Dark Passage	1947	Delmer Daves	Vincent Parry	Warner Bros.	
Always Together	1947	Frederick de Cordova	Himself	Warner Bros.	
The Treasure of the Sierra Madre	1948	John Huston	Fred C. Dobbs	Warner Bros.	
Key Largo	1948	John Huston	Frank McCloud	Warner Bros.	
Knock on Any Door	1949	Nicholas Ray	Andrew Morton	Santana Productions, Bogart's company founded in 1948	
Tokyo Joe	1949	Stuart Heisler	Joseph "Joe" Barrett	Santana Productions	
Chain Lightning	1950	Stuart Heisler	Lt. Col. Matthew "Matt" Brennan	Warner Bros.	
In a Lonely Place	1950	Nicholas Ray	Dixon Steele	Santana Productions; added to the National Film Registry in 2007, as "culturally, historically or aesthetically" significant.	
The Enforcer	1951	Bretaigne Windust, Raoul Walsh (uncredited)	Dist. Atty. Martin Ferguson	United States Pictures	
Sirocco	1951	Curtis Bernhardt	Harry Smith	Santana Productions	
The African Queen	1951	John Huston	Charlie Allnut	Won the "Best Actor Oscar, United Artists"	
Deadline – U.S.A.	1952	Richard Brooks	Ed Hutcheson	Fox Film	
Battle Circus	1953	Richard Brooks	Maj. Jed Webbe	MGM	
Beat the Devil	1953	John Huston	Billy Dannreuther	Romulus Films, Santana Pictures Corporation	
The Caine Mutiny	1954	Edward Dmytryk	Lt. Cmdr. Philip Francis Queeg	Nominated for Best Actor Oscar, Columbia Pictures	
Sabrina	1954	Billy Wilder	Linus Larrabee	Paramount Pictures	
The Barefoot Contessa	1954	Joseph L. Mankiewicz	Harry Dawes	Figaro, United Artists	
We're No Angels	1955	Michael Curtiz	Joseph	Paramount Pictures	
The Left Hand of God	1955	Edward Dmytryk	James "Jim" Carmody	Fox Film	
The Desperate Hours	1955	William Wyler	Glenn Griffin	Paramount Pictures	
The Harder They Fall	1956	Mark Robson	Eddie Willis	Columbia Pictures	

== Miscellaneous and uncredited film appearances (1944–1954) ==
Occasionally Bogart made public fund-raising or patriotic appearances on film. He also appeared in cameos, some uncredited, in a small handful of other films.

Miscellaneous and uncredited films of Humphrey Bogart
Title	Year	Notes	Ref.
I am an American	1944	Produced for Constitution Day	(Note: The 16-minute film short was shown in American theaters for "I Am an American Day" (now called Constitution Day). I Am an American was produced by Gordon Hollingshead, also written by Crane Wilbur. Besides Bogart, it featured Gary Gray, Dick Haymes, Danny Kaye, Joan Leslie, Dennis Morgan, Knute Rockne, and Jay Silverheels.)
Report from the Front	1944	American Red Cross fund-raising short	
Hollywood victory Caravan	1944	Victory Bond tour	
Two guys from Milwaukee	1946	A Warner Bros. film, with Bogart and Bacall cameo uncredited sitting at a table	
Always Together	1948	Bit part spoof of Stella Dallas, Bogart cameo crying against a window pane.	
Road to Bali	1952	A clip from The African Queen	
U.S. Savings Bond trailer	1952	Bogart urging Americans to buy savings bonds	
The Love Lottery	1954	Uncredited cameo David Niven film for Ealing Studios	

== Radio and television (1939–1955) ==
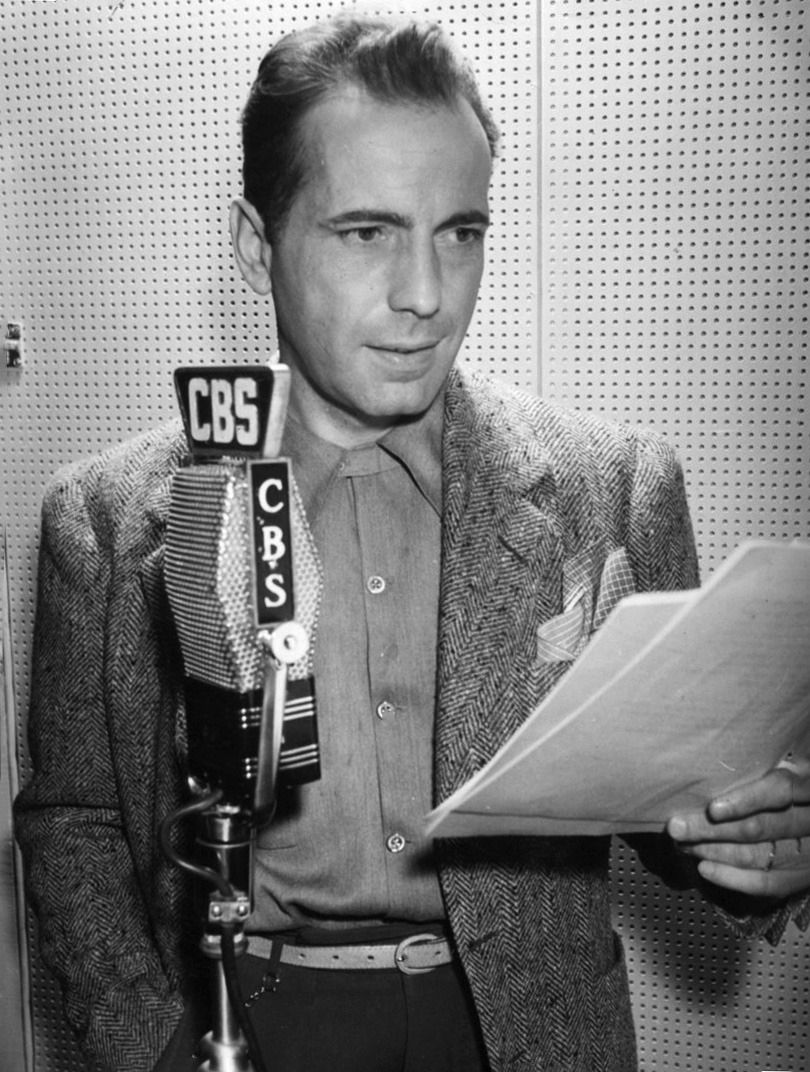
Bogart performing a radio role on Suspense

He made numerous radio and television appearances throughout his career. The Lux Radio Theatre was an anthology series featuring adaptations of Broadway plays and film scripts. It aired on the National Broadcasting Company's Blue Network (the forerunner of the American Broadcasting Company) (1934–35), CBS Radio network (1935–54), and NBC Radio (1954–55). The Screen Guild Theater (aka Gulf Screen Guild Theater aka Stars in the Air) was a radio anthology series broadcast from 1939 until 1952. Academy Award Theatre was a 1946 radio anthology series featuring adaptations of film scripts. Kraft Music Hall was a radio musical variety show on NBC radio from 1933 to 1949. The Bold Venture half-hour radio series ran for 78 episodes during 1951–1952, and was developed by Bogart's Santana Productions, as a starring vehicle for Bogart and his wife Lauren Bacall.

Radio and television credits of Humphrey Bogart
Program	Episode	Air date	Ref.
Lux Radio Theatre	Bullets or Ballots	April 17, 1939	
The Gulf Screen Guild Theater	The Petrified Forest	January 7, 1940	
The Gulf Screen Guild Theater	If You Could Only Cook	November 23, 1941	
The Gulf Screen Guild Theater	The amazing Dr. Clitterhouse	November 2, 1941	
The Screen Guild Theater	High Sierra	January 4, 1942	
Jack Benny Radio Program	The Frightwig Murder Case	February 2, 1942	
The Screen Guild Theater	Casablanca	April 26, 1943	
The Screen Guild Theater	The Maltese falcon	September 20, 1943	
Screen Guild Players	High Sierra	April 17, 1944	
Lux Radio Theatre	Moontide	April 30, 1945	
Academy Award Theatre	The Maltese falcon	July 3, 1946	
Lux Radio Theatre	To Have and Have Not	October 14, 1946	
Jack Benny Radio Program		January 5, 1947	
Kraft Music Hall		November 6, 1947	
Lux Radio Theatre	Treasure of the Sierra Madre	April 18, 1949	
Bold Venture	78-episode series	March 26, 1951	
Stars in the Air (Screen Guild Theater)	The House on 92nd Street	May 3, 1952	
Lux Radio Theatre	The African Queen	December 15, 1952	
Jack Benny television program (CBS – TV)		October 25, 1953	
Producers' Showcase (NBC – TV)	The Petrified Forest	May 30, 1955	

== Awards and honors ==
Bogart's first nomination for an Academy Award for Best Actor was for Casablanca (1942), a film that he and co-stars Ingrid Bergman and Paul Henreid initially believed was of little significance. (Note: "Bogart and Paul [Henreid] and especially me believed that Casablanca was a little picture, a waste of our time." [comment from Bergman] p. 10. "[Bergman] didn't want to be Ilsa in Casablanca. She wanted to be Maria in For Whom the Bell Tolls. And Humphrey didn't really want to be Rick. Ingrid remembered that the only subject they had in common, was how much they both wanted to get out of Casablanca". p. 82. "[Henreid] had declined the part of Lazlo, because he felt it wouldn't be a good one for his future career in Hollywood." p. 85.) Bogart won the award on his second nomination, for his 1951 performance in the United Artists production The African Queen. He was nominated a third time for The Caine Mutiny (1954). He posthumously received a star on the Hollywood Walk of Fame in 1960. The United States Postal Service honored Bogart in 1997, at a ceremony at Grauman's Chinese Theatre unveiling Bogart's stamp as part of the postal service's "Legends of Hollywood" series. In 2006, the street in front of his boyhood home was renamed Humphrey Bogart Place.

Year	Association	Category	Project	Result
1944	Academy Awards	Best Actor	Casablanca	Nominated
1952	Academy Awards	Best Actor	The African Queen	Won
1955	Academy Awards	Best Actor	The Caine Mutiny	Nominated
1953	BAFTA Film Awards	Best Foreign Actor	The African Queen	Nominated
1949	Golden Apple Awards	Sour Apple—Least Cooperative Actor	—N/a	Won
1960	Hollywood Walk of Fame	Motion Picture Star (Note: Posthumous honor.)	—N/a	Honored^{†}
1937	National Board of Review Awards	Best Acting (Note: Bogart was named amongst a list of several actors, with whom he shared the accolade.)	Black Legion	Won
1941	National Board of Review Awards	Best Acting	High Sierra	Won
1941	National Board of Review Awards	Best Acting	The Maltese Falcon	Won
1944	National Board of Review Awards	Best Acting	To Have and Have Not	Won
1942	New York Film Critics Circle Awards	Best Actor	Across the Pacific	Nominated
1942	New York Film Critics Circle Awards	Best Actor	Casablanca	Nominated
1954	New York Film Critics Circle Awards	Best Actor	The Caine Mutiny	Nominated (Note: Tied with Edmond O'Brien for The Barefoot Contessa (1954).)
2001	Online Film & Television Association	OFTA Film Hall of Fame – Acting	—N/a	Honored
2022	Online Film & Television Association	OFTA Film Hall of Fame – Character (Rick Blaine)	Casablanca	Honored
1936	Photoplay Awards	Best Performances of the Month (March)	The Petrified Forest	Won
1937	Photoplay Awards	Best Performances of the Month (March)	Black Legion	Won
1941	Photoplay Awards	Best Performances of the Month (April)	High Sierra	Won
1942	Photoplay Awards	Best Performances of the Month (January)	The Maltese Falcon	Won
1943	Photoplay Awards	Best Performances of the Month (February)	Casablanca	Won
1943	Photoplay Awards	Best Performances of the Month (December)	Sahara	Won
1945	Photoplay Awards	Best Performances of the Month (January)	To Have and Have Not	Won
1948	Photoplay Awards	Best Performances of the Month (March)	The Treasure of the Sierra Madre	Won
1949	Photoplay Awards	Best Performances of the Month (April)	Knock on Any Door	Won
1950	Photoplay Awards	Best Performances of the Month (February)	Chain Lightning	Won
1950	Photoplay Awards	Best Performances of the Month (July)	In a Lonely Place	Won
1952	Photoplay Awards	Best Performances of the Month (March)	The African Queen	Won
1952	Photoplay Awards	Best Performances of the Month (June)	Deadline – U.S.A.	Won
1944	Photoplay Awards	Gold Medal—Most Popular Male Star	—N/a	Nominated
1947	Photoplay Awards	Gold Medal—Most Popular Male Star	—N/a	Nominated
1948	Photoplay Awards	Gold Medal—Most Popular Male Star	—N/a	Nominated
1953	Picturegoer Awards	Best Actor	The African Queen	Won

== See also ==
- Lauren Bacall on screen and stage

== Bibliography ==
- Barbour, Alan G. (1973). Humphrey Bogart. New York: Galahad Books. Reprint: ISBN 978-0-88365-163-6.
- Chandler, Charlotte (2007). Ingrid: Ingrid Bergman, a Personal Biography. New York: Simon & Schuster. ISBN 978-0-7432-9421-8.
- Dunning, John (1998). On the Air: The Encyclopedia of Old-Time Radio (Revised ed.). New York: Oxford University Press. ISBN 978-0-19-507678-3.
- Koszarski, Richard (2008). Hollywood on the Hudson: Film and Television in New York from Griffith to Sarnoff. New Brunswick, New Jersey: Rutgers University Press. ISBN 978-0-8135-4552-3.
- Porter, Darwin (2010). Humphrey Bogart, the Making of a Legend. New York: Blood Moon Productions. ISBN 978-1-936003-14-3.
- Terrace, Vincent (2015). Radio Programs, 1924–1984: A Catalog of More than 1800 Shows. Jefferson, NC: McFarland & Company. ISBN 978-1-4766-0528-9.
