= Six Cylinder Love (1931 film) =

1931 film

- Directed by: Thornton Freeland
- Written by: William Conselman; Norman Houston
- Based on: Six Cylinder Love by William Anthony McGuire
- Produced by: William Fox; John W. Considine Jr.
- Starring: Spencer Tracy; Sidney Fox; Edward Everett Horton
- Cinematography: Ernest Palmer
- Edited by: J. Edwin Robbins
- Production company: Fox Film Corporation
- Distributed by: Fox Film Corporation
- Release date: May 10, 1931
- Running time: 71 minutes
- Country: United States
- Language: English
- Box office: $327,000

Six Cylinder Love is a 1931 American pre-Code comedy film directed by Thornton Freeland and starring Spencer Tracy, Sidney Fox and Edward Everett Horton. It was produced and distributed by Fox Film Corporation and is a remake of their 1923 silent original. Both films are based on the 1921 Broadway play. It recorded a loss of $25,000. A further remake The Honeymoon's Over was released in 1939.

== Plot ==
A fast-talking auto salesman persuades a couple of newlyweds to purchase a new car that they can ill afford to boost their social prestige. It soon proves to be more trouble than it is worth, leading to the wife getting into trouble by drunk driving and the husband to fall foul of his boss. Eventually, with the help of the auto salesman, they find someone else to sell the car to.

== Cast ==
- Spencer Tracy as William Donroy
- Edward Everett Horton as Monty Winston
- Sidney Fox as Marilyn Sterling
- Lorin Raker as Gilbert Sterling
- William Collier, Sr. as Richard Burton
- Una Merkel as Margaret Rogers
- William Holden as Stapleton
- Bert Roach as Harold Rogers
- Ruth Warren as Mrs. Burton
- El Brendel as Axel
