= The Films of Andrei Tarkovsky: A Visual Fugue =

1994 book by Vida T. Johnson and Graham Petrie

The Films of Andrei Tarkovsky A Visual Fugue
- Front cover
- Author: Vida T. Johnson; Graham Petrie
- Language: English
- Genre: Biography, film theory
- Publisher: Indiana University Press
- Publication date: December 22, 1994
- Publication place: United States
- Pages: 352
- ISBN: 0253208874

The Films of Andrei Tarkovsky: A Visual Fugue is a 1994 book about Russian filmmaker Andrei Tarkovsky's life and work, written by film scholars Vida T. Johnson and Graham Petrie. The authors discuss Tarkovsky's time in the Soviet film industry; closely summarize and interpret each individual film made by him; and discuss formal and thematic patterns across his works.

While some film scholars took issue with the authors' evaluation of Tarkovsky's film writings or with certain claims they make about Tarkovsky himself, the book was widely acclaimed for its detail and was described by multiple writers as the best English-language study of the filmmaker up to that point.

== Summary ==
The Films of Andrei Tarkovsky consists of three parts, followed by an appendix, notes, filmography, bibliography, and index. Johnson and Petrie are critical of previous views on Tarkovsky, and the book is a corrective work. Reviewer Donato Totaro places it in the movement of "new auteurism" for the scholars' approach of biographical, cultural, and historical contextualization, comparing it to Chris Faulkner's The Social Cinema of Jean Renoir.

The first part is devoted to biographical material and information on the state of the Soviet film industry during Tarkovsky's career. In the first chapter (called "A Martyred Artist?"), Johnson and Petrie argue that the idea of Tarkovsky as a "martyred artist" is a myth constructed largely by the filmmaker himself; they note that various other Soviet directors were treated much worse (such as Sergei Parajanov, Andrei Konchalovsky, and Kira Muratova). They also point out that although he had enemies who felt that he was drawing too heavily on European cinema, he also had various defenders within Goskino. The following chapter, "Shaping an Aesthetics of Cinema", is about Tarkovsky's film writings.

The second part is devoted to discussion of his films, from The Steamroller and the Violin onward. With the exception of the chapter on both the aforementioned work (in which Ivan's Childhood is also discussed), each chapter centers on one individual work. It includes information on the scripting, production history, release, and critical reception of the film, followed by the authors' analysis of the film. They aim to avoid overly speculative interpretations of his works, and criticize other writers as forming these.

Among the assumptions debunked is the view of Western critics that political differences caused Tarkovsky's bureaucratic problems. Johnson and Petrie claim that his unconventional storytelling and cinematic style caused them. For example, Andrei Rublev was negatively received in Russia because it was unlike a Socialist Realist historical-epic, not because it was feared as a subversive statement on the plight of the artist in the Soviet Union.

In the third part, Johnson and Petrie discuss formal, iconographic, and thematic patterns (such as his specific use of time) across Tarkovsky's films, as well as his relationship to other art forms like painting and literature. In chapter 13, they express agreement with Bàlint Andràs Kovàcs and Akos Szilàgyi (the authors of the 1987 work Les mondes d'Andreï Tarkovski) that Tarkovsky's films are structured around an opposition "between the outer world and personal consciousness, with a few individuals providing the only remaining link between the brutalised [...] present and the spiritual values of a largely forgotten communal past".

According to one reviewer, the scholars view Tarkovsky as an artist who, over the course of his career, increasingly suppresses or sublimates his feelings "into an austere and rigid spirituality"; they also consider his importance as a filmmaker to lie largely in his successful creation of "dream films".

The appendix features detailed synopses of all films besides Mirror (which is already discussed in part two for longer than any other work).

== Reception ==
=== Positive ===
Donato Totaro of Concordia University described The Films of Andrei Tarkovsky as "by far the most exhaustively researched and critically rigorous" of the four English-language books on the director up to that point. While saying that Johnson and Petrie excessively attack others' interpretations, and have an interpretation of The Sacrifice that is too based on the original script, the reviewer said that the book's writers avoid jargon, avoid dogmatic Christian interpretation, and discuss Mirror in a way that is "exhaustive [...] their descriptive and cultural-historical analysis operating at its finest". Totaro claimed that the overall book contains "a wealth of new research and critical insight [...] Johnson and Petrie have written what is, and will likely remain for some time, the definitive book on Tarkovsky."

In Cinéaste, Louis Menashe praised the book as "a welcome addition, easily the best in English, to the literature" on Tarkovsky, and a "lucid, level-headed guide". He found their reflections on his work much more helpful than those of the filmmaker himself, and said the writers overly excuse his inaccessibility but offer appropriately measured praise of his cinematic style. Menashe also praised the book for avoiding jargon and declared, "For Tarkovsky lovers as well as haters, this is an essential book. It might make even the haters reconsider." Christopher Sharrett, Professor of Film Studies at Seton Hall University, wrote, "Of the many books on Tarkovsky (some merely picture books or treatises bent on proving an obvious or eccentric theory), this seems to me the most useful".

Peter Kenez at UC Santa Cruz said that Johnson and Petrie understand the director's intentions, as well as the cultural and political context in which he worked. He also stated that "they help the reader to make sense of obscure references [and] manage to deal with their difficult subject matter without ever resorting to jargon [...] Anyone who wants to make sense of Tarkovsky's films—a very difficult task in any case—must read it." Richard Taylor at Swansea University referred to the book as "a model of contextual and textual analysis" that reveals the thematic structure and coherence of his work. The reviewer also argued that in the discussions of individual films in part two, myths created and sustained by a number of earlier Western writers "are politely but effectively demolished." Taylor called the book "a major contribution, not merely to the study of Soviet cinema, but to cinema scholarship more generally. It deserves not only to be widely read, but in its approach and format to be widely emulated."

Russell Campbell reported that Johnson and Petrie bring "industrious and rigorous scholarship" to the task of establishing the facts of Tarkovsky's career and recording his works' details; however, he argued that "the book's reluctance to move beyond basic description tends to leave a void, and the attacks on other critics [...] at times verge on the pedantic." He claimed that Mark Le Fanu and Ian Christie had already demonstrated Tarkovsky wasn't a true martyr, and said the agreement of Johnson and Petrie with Kovàcs and Szilàgy is the "closest the authors come to a general interpretive framework". Ultimately, he said The Films of Andrei Tarkovsky is not "the new work of critical insight and analysis that this most poetic of directors so richly merits", but still an "indispensable prolegomena" due to its factual data.

=== Mixed or unfavorable ===
Dina Iordanova wrote that Tarkovsky's view of himself as a martyr was more justified than Johnson and Petrie imply, saying that his difficulties at home were more serious than the ones he had when working for Western producers. Iordanova also argued that there is sometimes an excess of detail creating an unclear point, and some failures to recognize certain symbols as having multiple interpretations. While reporting that in many ways "attention to detail is a major characteristic of the study", the reviewer said that Tarkovsky's political views and the Christian elements in his work weren't discussed enough, and criticized the scholars for evaluating Tarkovsky's "ideological credo" from Western standpoint.

Natasha Synessios at the University of London wrote that The Films of Andrei Tarkovsky contains a "more detailed and richer analysis of his films" than previous studies. She also claimed that "many prevalent mistakes are set right". However, she argued that some of their biographical readings of film scenes are unconvincing because the book's general scope precludes the thorough sort of biographical criticism needed to prove that the relevant life details explain the art. She argued that Johnson and Petrie overly read Tarkovsky's later work as spiritual rather than place it "within a social, cultural, personal and [...] political context". Synessios also regarded a term used to characterize the filmmaker's work as both an ill-defined term and a mischaracterization.

David Pratt criticized the book. He said some points of "significant nuance" are made successfully, and that the interviews with people connected to Tarkovsky illuminate his aesthetic intentions well. However, Pratt deemed Tarkovsky more influenced by others than Johnson and Petrie imply, and criticized the authors' Western lens of death of the author throughout their evaluation of Tarkovsky's film writings (stating they should be viewed in the context of Marxist-Soviet aesthetic criticism instead). He also said they overly assume that a detail from his life has the same role in a film as in his life, criticizing the guess about Tarkovsky's sexuality that results.
