= Murders in the Rue Morgue (1932 film) =

American horror film

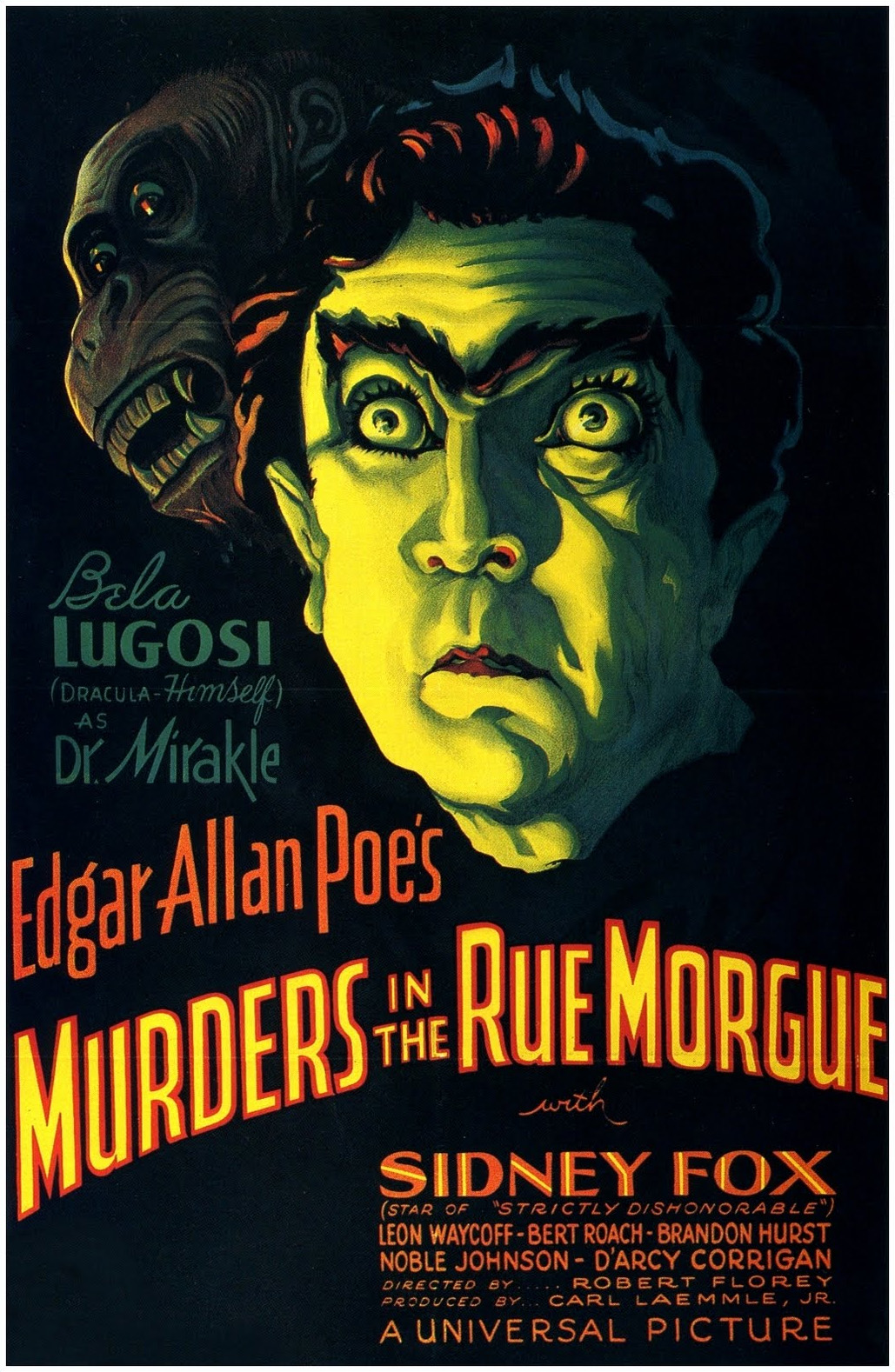
- Theatrical release poster by Karoly Grosz
- Directed by: Robert Florey
- Screenplay by: Tom Reed; Dale Van Every
- Based on: The Murders in the Rue Morgue; 1841 story by Edgar Allan Poe
- Produced by: Carl Laemmle Jr.
- Starring: Bela Lugosi; Sidney Fox; Leon Ames; Bert Roach; Brandon Hurst; Noble Johnson; D'Arcy Corrigan
- Cinematography: Karl W. Freund
- Edited by: Milton Carruth
- Production company: Universal Pictures
- Distributed by: Universal Pictures
- Release dates: February 10, 1932 (RKO-Mayfair Theatre); February 21, 1932
- Running time: 62 minutes
- Country: United States
- Language: English
- Budget: $186,090

Murders in the Rue Morgue is a 1932 American horror film directed by Robert Florey, based on Edgar Allan Poe's 1841 short story The Murders in the Rue Morgue. The plot is about Doctor Mirakle (Bela Lugosi), a carnival sideshow entertainer and scientist who kidnaps Parisian women to mix their blood with that of his gorilla, Erik. As his experiments fail because of the quality of his victims' blood, Mirakle meets with Camille L'Espanye (Sidney Fox), and has her kidnapped and her mother (Betty Ross Clarke) murdered, leading to suspicion falling on Camille's fiancé, Pierre Dupin (Leon Waycoff), a medical student who has already become interested in the earlier murders.

Florey had suggested adapting Poe's story as early as March 1930 but he was only attached after being taken off Frankenstein (1931). Only a few elements of Poe's story remain in the script by Tom Reed and Dale Van Every; much of the story was changed to accommodate a role for Lugosi. Florey left the project but returned, arguing with Universal about elements such as period setting. After production wrapped on November 13, 1931, it was brought back into production for five days of reshoots and reordering of scenes in the final edit.

The film was first shown publicly in New York on February 10, 1932, and its wide release was censored throughout North America. The authors of Universal Horrors described initial reviews of the film as "harsh" while later reviews from historians and home video reviewers were lukewarm. The film led to other Poe stories being adapted by Universal Pictures; it was also the first to have Lugosi in a role of either a mad scientist or a doctor, roles he would reprise later in his career from The Black Cat (1934) to Bride of the Monster (1955).

== Plot ==
In 1845 in Paris, mad scientist Dr. Mirakle abducts young women and injects them with ape blood to create a mate for Erik, his talking sideshow ape. Pierre Dupin, a young, naive medical student and detective, Pierre's fiancée Camille L'Espanaye, and their friends Paul and Mignette, visit Mirakle's sideshow, where he exhibits Erik. Both Mirakle and his servant Janos are enchanted by Camille, who Mirakle plans as a mate for Erik. Mirakle invites Camille to take a closer look at Erik, who grabs her bonnet. Pierre tries to retrieve the bonnet but Erik tries to strangle him. Mirakle restrains Erik and offers to replace the bonnet but Camille is suspicious and is reluctant to give the doctor her address. When Pierre and Camille leave, Mirakle orders Janos to follow them.

One of Mirakle's victims, a prostitute, is found dead in a river and her body is taken to the police station. Pierre wants to examine the victim's blood but the morgue keeper forbids it. Pierre bribes the morgue keeper to draw some of the victim's blood and deliver it to him the next day. Pierre discovers a foreign substance in the blood of the prostitute and other murder victims. Mirakle visits Camille and asks her to visit Erik again; when she refuses, Mirakle sends Erik to kidnap her. Pierre, who is leaving his flat, hears Camille's screams; he tries to enter the room but it is locked. When Erik has retreated, the police arrive and arrest Pierre. Neither Camille nor her mother are found. A police prefect interviews three witnesses: Italian Alberto Montani, German Franz Odenheimer and a Danish man, all of whom state they heard Camille screaming and someone else talking in a foreign language. Camille's mother is found dead; her body is stuffed into a chimney and her hand is clutching ape fur, from which Pierre deduces Erik may be involved.

The police, along with Pierre, run to Mirakle's hideout, where Erik turns against Mirakle and strangles him. When the police arrive, Erik grabs Camille and the police chase him and shoot Janos, who tries to keep them at bay. The police corner Erik on the roof of a small dockside house. Erik confronts Pierre, who fatally shoots Erik, saving his fiancée from peril.

== Cast ==
Cast sourced from the book Universal Horrors:

- Bela Lugosi as Dr. Mirakle
- Sidney Fox as Camille L'Espanaye
- Leon Ames as Pierre Dupin (as Leon Waycoff)
- Bert Roach as Paul
- Betty Ross Clarke as Madame L'Espanaye
- Brandon Hurst as Prefect of Police
- D'Arcy Corrigan as Morgue Keeper
- Noble Johnson as Janos
- Arlene Francis as Streetwalker
- Charles Gemora as Erik
- Torben Meyer as The Dane
- Agostino Montani as Alberto Montani
- Herman Bing as Franz Odenheimer

== Production ==
Robert Florey first mentioned the Edgar Allan Poe story "The Murders in the Rue Morgue" to Universal Studios in March 1930, at which time Dracula was on release and Frankenstein was in pre-production, so planning an adaptation of Poe's story did not begin until 1931. A story treatment was prepared by April 1931; Bela Lugosi was cast and it was to be directed by George Melford, who directed the Spanish-language version of Dracula. The studio dropped Melford and replaced him with Florey. Bette Davis was auditioned for the part of Camille L'Espanaye; according to Florey, Carl Laemmle Jr. rejected her due to "a lack of sex appeal". The only elements of Poe's story used in the film are the discovery of a corpse in a chimney and the discussion over which language the murderer spoke. Much of Poe's story was changed to accommodate a role for Lugosi as Doctor Mirakle; Florey said he "had to strengthen and lengthen the Poe short story" and that he "added numerous characters".

The initial budget of $130,000 was cut to $90,000. At one point, Florey left the production but later returned to it. Florey fought with Universal over the story's 1845 setting; Universal wanted the film to have a contemporaneous setting. Filming began on October 19, 1931, and finished on November 13 the same year. John Huston, who was working for Universal as a staff writer, is credited for writing additional dialogue; Huston said his role was trying "to bring Poe's prose style into the dialogue, but the director thought it sounded stilted, so he and his assistants rewrote scenes on the set. As a result, the picture was an odd mixture of nineteenth century grammarian prose and modern colloquialisms". Leon Ames later said Florey "wasn't happy on the picture, but he never talked about it [...] He didn't like the script, he wanted to fix it and they wouldn't let him". Ames also said Florey "wasn't a powerful director in those days; that's what frustrated him ... He didn't care too much for the executives".

Although Murders in the Rue Morgue officially ended production at Universal on November 13, 1931, Frankenstein was becoming a commercial success so Universal put the film back into production on December 10 and increased the budget to $186,090 after adding seven days of retakes and newly developed scenes. Scenes filmed during this post-production period include a retake of the duel sequence, new scenes of Pierre Dupin (Leon Ames)'s and Camille (Sidney Fox)'s rooms, five days of re-filming of the rooftop climax and close-ups of a chimpanzee at Selig zoo. Several scenes in the film's first half were re-ordered during this post-production period.

== Release ==
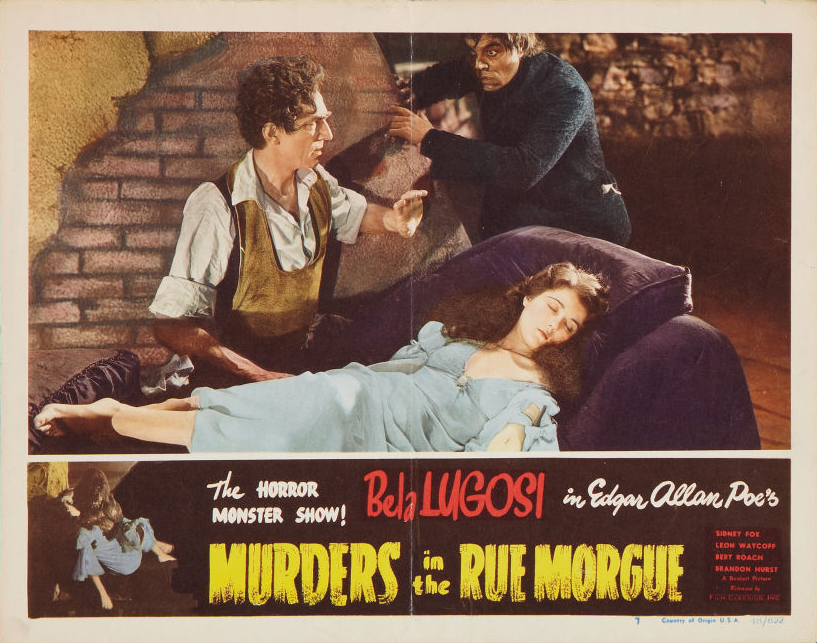
Lobby card for the 1949 re-release of Murders in the Rue Morgue by Realart Pictures Inc.

The Hollywood Reporter wrote about a preview screening on January 6, 1932, stating the film "gave Santa Ana a perfectly delightful scare and a sleepless night", calling Robert Florey as a "smart choice" for director and saying Fox is "nice in appearance". The reviewer also said Lugosi "has the physical necessities and is so legitimately trained that even though his performance does smack of the old legit, he is perfection in a role of this sort. Lugosi chews scenery, but he makes an audience like it".

On February 10, Murders in the Rue Morgue opened at New York's RKO-Mayfair Theatre. A report in Variety noted the crowd "hooted the finale hokum". The film made $21,000 in its week at that theater but did poor business nationally in comparison to Dracula and Frankenstein. Murders in the Rue Morgue was released on February 21, and was distributed theatrically by Universal Pictures. Censor boards in the United States abbreviated scenes showing the death of the prostitute (Arlene Francis) and removed shots of her being stabbed and of her tied up in a laboratory. Censors also removed scenes with dancing girls and elements of the plot that suggested man evolved from apes. According to the American Film Institute, despite some sources listing the film's running time as 75 minutes, the group could find no proof it ran at this length. According to the entry on the films database, nearly all sources give the film a running time of 62 minutes, except for Film Daily, which gave it a running time of 75 minutes. In March 1947, Universal announced it would re-release Dracula (1931) and Frankenstein (1931) on a double bill. After playing in Los Angeles, Murders in the Rue Morgue continued to be run in theaters, leading to more theatrical re-issues by Realart Pictures towards the end of the 1940s. Murders in the Rue Morgue was re-released theatrically in 1949.

=== Home media ===
In September 1992, MCA/Universal released Murders in the Rue Morgue on home video. In 2005, the film along with The Black Cat, The Raven, The Invisible Ray and Black Friday was released on DVD as part of the Bela Lugosi Collection. Shout! Factory released the film on Blu-ray with two audio commentaries included as bonus extras in 2019. Eureka Entertainment released the film on Blu-ray in July 2020, in a set called Three Edgar Allan Poe Adaptations Starring Bela Lugosi, which also includes The Black Cat and The Raven, as part of their Masters of Cinema collection.

In 2004, film critic and historian Tim Lucas wrote an article titled "Re-arranging the Rue Morgue" in Video Watchdog, in which he suggested re-arranging some scenes to potentially follow Florey's original intentions. Lucas's article led Gary L. Prange to write a letter to the magazine suggesting edits that would eliminate continuity errors in Lucas's re-arrangement. A version of the film based on Lucas and Prange's proposed rearrangements is available as an Easter egg on the Masters of Cinema Blu-ray; it can be accessed by highlighting the film's title on the main menu.

== Reception ==
According to the book Universal Horrors, Murders in the Rue Morgue's critical reception on its release was "harsh". Among contemporaneous reviews, Andre Sennwald of The New York Times said the film suffers from "an overzealous effort at terrorization" and that the cast were overacting. Variety called the film "sexed up to the limit" as "Sidney Fox overdraws the sweet ingenue to the point of nearly distracting any audience from any fear it may have for her". The National Board of Review Magazine commented: "The story holds one's interest throughout although the acting is not especially outstanding and the story does not take advantage of the full amount of horror that one would expect from Poe's work". Kate Cameron of the New York Daily News said the film is an "artificial screen story" and praised the ending sequence.

Among the positive reviews, Bill Swigart of The Hollywood Herald said the film will "evoke loud praises from those who appreciate the beauty of soft artistic backgrounds in harmony with the beauty of the period and environment" and praised the characterization as "near perfect as one could expect". While reviewers commented negatively on the acting, some praised Lugosi's performance. Cameron noted Lugosi's "suggestion of the insanely criminal doctor is effective" while the British publication Today's Cinema said Lugosi portrayed Dr. Mirakle "in a most realistic fashion". The Washington Post called Lugosi "a great actor" who "can coin new thrills".

From retrospective reviews, Patrick Legare of AllMovie rated Murders in the Rue Morgue with four stars out of five, praising Lugosi's acting, Karl Freund's cinematography, and Florey's direction while finding the script and the rest of the cast and characters weak. The authors of Universal Horrors said despite the film being "flawed and creaky" with "dated acting, stilted dialogue and mawkish romance", Murders in the Rue Morgue is "very likely the most underrated of the Universal Horrors".

Glenn Erickson of DVD Talk called the film a "hugely enjoyable mess" that is "often derided for its awkward acting and logic-challenged story". Erickson also commented Lugosi's acting contributes "to a feeling of dreamlike unreality". In Leonard Maltin's Movie Guide, the film is ranked the highest of the three feature-film adaptations of Poe's eponymous story. Michael H. Price of the Fort Worth Star-Telegram compared a 1986 television version to other adaptations, stating Florey's 1932 version "remains the best" of them.

== Legacy ==
Long after its release, members of the cast and crew commented on Murders in the Rue Morgue. Florey hoped the film would start his career and thought it would have been better if the villain had been written out of the script. Florey left Universal after the film's release and signed to Warner Bros., where he maintained a four-or-five pictures a year work flow. Florey made only one more feature-length horror film,The Beast With Five Fingers (1946), which also features The Cabinet of Dr. Caligari-like shadows and dark figures. Florey also later directed episodes of The Twilight Zone and The Outer Limits. Leon Ames also disliked Murders in the Rue Morgue, saying in an interview in Famous Monsters of Filmland it is "a perfectly awful film which still pops up on TV to haunt me".

Lugosi starred in several more putative adaptations of Poe's oeuvre, including The Black Cat (1934) and The Raven (1935), in which he again played scientists. Lugosi was often cast as either a mad scientist or a doctor in future films, including The Phantom Creeps (1939), The Devil Bat (1940), The Corpse Vanishes (1942), The Ape Man (1943), Return of the Ape Man (1944), Mother Riley Meets the Vampire (1952) and Bride of the Monster (1955). Lugosi also appeared in other Poe-related works outside of film, such as an adaptation of "The Cask of Amontillado" for the television series Suspense and a radio performance of Poe's "The Tell-Tale Heart".

Later adaptations of "The Murders in the Rue Morgue" include Phantom of the Rue Morgue (1954), a color 3D film that was produced by Warner Bros. This version of the film also includes Charles Gemora, who appears as Sultan, an ape that terrorizes 19th-century Paris. Gordon Hessler directed a 1971 adaptation of Murders in the Rue Morgue, which is closer to being an adaptation of The Phantom of the Opera by Gaston Leroux than of Poe's tale. According to Hessler, "the problem with the original story, which is a mystery where the 'monkey' did it, was not the kind of story you could do anymore". A 1986 television adaptation of the story was directed by Jeannot Szwarc and stars George C. Scott as Auguste Dupin.

== See also ==
- Bela Lugosi filmography
- List of American films of 1932
- List of horror films of the 1930s
- List of Universal Pictures films (1930–1939)
- Rejection of evolution by religious groups
