= Nice Women =

1931 film

- Directed by: Edwin H. Knopf
- Written by: Gladys Lehman (continuity); Richard Schaver (scenario editor)
- Screenplay by: Edwin H. Knopf
- Based on: Nice Women, 1929 play by William A Grew
- Produced by: E.M. Asher
- Starring: Sidney Fox; Frances Dee; Alan Mowbray; Lucile Gleason; Russell Gleason; James Durkin
- Cinematography: Charles J. Stumar
- Edited by: Robert Carlisle; Maurice Pivar (supervising film editor)
- Music by: Irving Bibo
- Production company: Universal Pictures
- Distributed by: Universal Pictures
- Release date: November 28, 1931
- Running time: 68 or 72 minutes
- Country: United States
- Language: English

Nice Women is a 1931 American pre-Code romance film written and directed by Edwin H. Knopf. The film stars Sidney Fox, Frances Dee, Alan Mowbray, Lucile Gleason, Russell Gleason and James Durkin. It was released by Universal Pictures on November 28, 1931.

The film is based on the Broadway play Nice Women by William A. Grew, which premiered at the Longacre Theatre on June 10, 1929, and closed in August 1929 after 64 performances.

== Plot ==
A young woman, Jerry Girard is pushed by her mother and family into accepting the marriage proposal of a millionaire, Mark Chandler, who is the employer of her father. To do so, she has to drop the boy she really loves and promised to marry, Billy Wells, but her family is seeking to recover from their financial woes and find security. When the millionaire finds out the real situation, he releases her from her vow and gives the young couple a $5000 wedding gift. He then leaves for Europe with an old flame, Dorothy Drew.

== Cast ==
- Sidney Fox as Beth Girard
- Frances Dee as Jerry Girard
- Alan Mowbray as Mark Chandler
- Lucile Gleason as Mrs. Girard
- Russell Gleason as Bill Wells
- James Durkin as Mr. Girard
- Kenneth Seiling as Jackie Girard
- Carmel Myers as Dorothy Drew
- Leonard Carey as Connors
- Jo Wallace as Miss Irvine
- Patsy O'Byrne as Mary
- Florence Enright as Maid

== Reception ==
The review in The New York Times called the film a "puerile story of a frustrated romance" and a "sorry affair" caused by "too many studio cooks", and points out "the plain fact of its mediocrity..." The reviewer also reports that the audience seemed indifferent to the film.
