= Money Talks (1926 film) =

1926 film by Archie Mayo

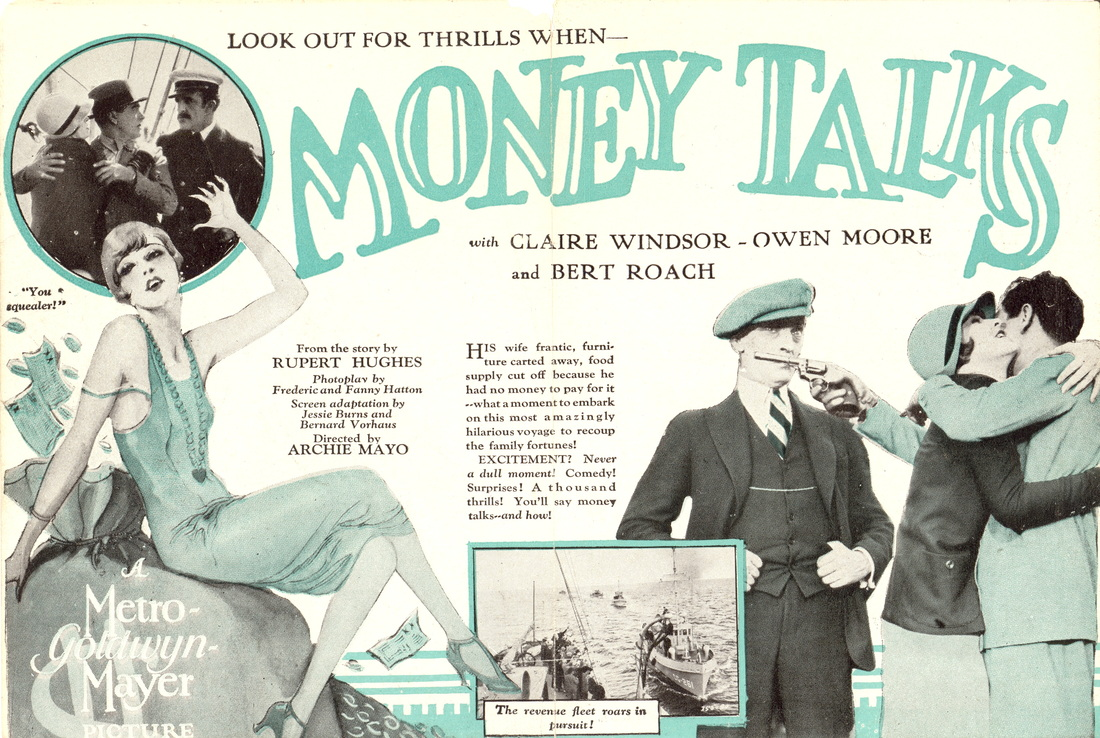
- Directed by: Archie Mayo
- Written by: Jessie Burns; Bernard Vorhaus
- Based on: Money Talks by Rupert Hughes
- Starring: Claire Windsor; Bert Roach; Owen Moore; Ned Sparks
- Cinematography: William H. Daniels
- Edited by: Ben Lewis
- Production company: Metro-Goldwyn-Mayer
- Distributed by: Metro-Goldwyn-Mayer
- Release date: May 10, 1926
- Running time: 70 minutes
- Country: United States
- Language: Silent (English intertitles)

Money Talks is a 1926 American silent comedy film directed by Archie Mayo. The film stars Claire Windsor, Bert Roach, Owen Moore and Ned Sparks. It is written by Jessie Burns and Bernard Vorhaus, based on the story by Rupert Hughes.

== Plot ==
Sam Starling (Owen Moore) is deep in debt, his wife Phoebe (Claire Windsor) is leaving him and still he is confident. When Phoebe boards a luxury yacht and is wooed by the captain, Sam comes aboard as a woman and tries to seduce the captain (in fact, a liquor smuggler), away from his wife.

== Cast ==
- Claire Windsor as Phoebe Starling
- Owen Moore as Sam Starling
- Bert Roach as Oscar Waters
- Ned Sparks as Lucius Fenton
- Phillips Smalley as J.B. Perkins
- Dot Farley as Mrs. Chatterton
- Kathleen Key as Vamp
- George Kuwa as Ah Foo

== Preservation ==
Money Talks is currently presumed lost. In February of 2021, the film was cited by the National Film Preservation Board on their Lost U.S. Silent Feature Films list.
