= Down to Their Last Yacht =

1934 film by Paul Sloane

- Directed by: Paul Sloane
- Written by: Herbert Fields; Lou Brock
- Screenplay by: Marion Dix; Lynn Starling
- Produced by: Lou Brock; Pandro S. Berman
- Starring: Mary Boland; Polly Moran; Ned Sparks; Sidney Fox
- Cinematography: Edward Cronjager
- Edited by: Arthur Roberts
- Music by: Roy Webb
- Production company: RKO Radio Pictures
- Distributed by: RKO Radio Pictures
- Release date: August 31, 1934
- Running time: 64 minutes
- Country: United States
- Language: English

Down to Their Last Yacht is a 1934 American comedy adventure film directed by Paul Sloane and steering Mary Boland, Polly Moran and Ned Sparks. It was produced and distributed by RKO Pictures.

== Plot ==
After the stock market crash of 1929, the Colt-Stratton family is forced to rent their yacht to the nouveau riche at the behest of Nella Fitzgerald, including gambler Barry Forbes and his sidekick Freddy Finn. When Freddy rigs the yacht's roulette wheel to respond to his saxophone, he is caught, but moments later, Captain "Sunny Jim" Roberts runs the yacht aground on the South Sea Island of Malakamokolu, ruled by Queen Malakamokalu, a White woman, who takes the passengers as forced labor. Tiring them, she offers to release them if Barry stays to marry her. However, once she hears Freddy play his saxophone, she falls in love with him and plans to blow up the yacht with a bomb. Barry manages to rescue the passengers, not the boat, and they accept their new home in the tropics.

== Cast ==
- Mary Boland as Queen Malakamokalu
- Polly Moran as Nella Fitzgerald
- Ned Sparks as Captain "Sunny Jim" Roberts
- Sidney Fox as Linda Colt-Stratton
- Sidney Blackmer as Barry Forbes
- Sterling Holloway as Freddy Finn
- Marjorie Gateson as Mrs. Geoffrey Colt-Stratton
- Irene Franklin as Mrs. Gilhooley
- Charles Coleman as Sir Guy
- Felix Knight as Island Singer (uncredited)
- Ramsay Hill as Geoffrey Colt-Stratton Jr. (uncredited)

== Production ==
Two separate units were used to speed up production, one directed by producer Lou Brock and the other by director Paul Sloane. Sam White was hired to direct retakes, supervised by Brock, which involved re-shooting a quarter of the film. Brock was given carte blanche on the film, which went considerably over budget; it turned out to be his last production for RKO.

== Reception ==
The New York Times review of the film called the movie "a sorry melange of Hollywood native dancing, theme-song singing and preposterous comedy."

The film was a box-office disappointment for RKO.
