= D'Arcy Corrigan =

Irish actor

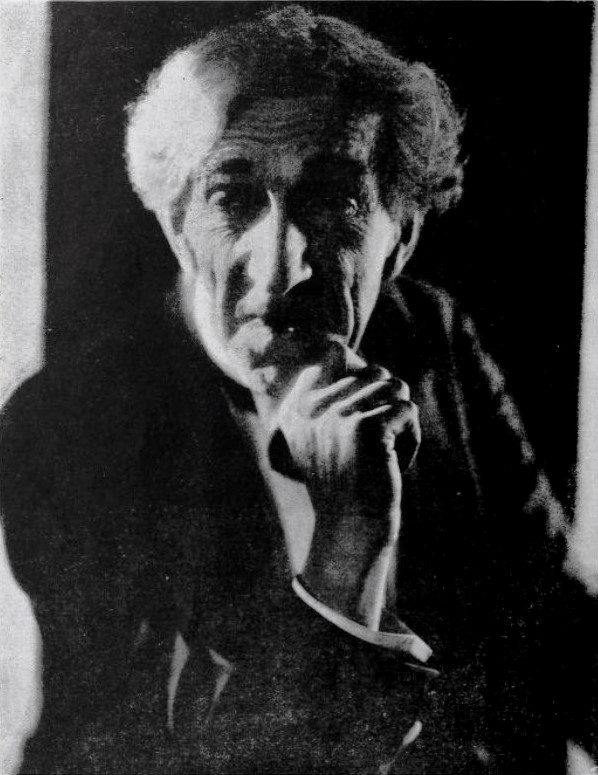
- Corrigan in 1926
- Born: 2 January 1870; County Cork, Ireland
- Died: 25 December 1945 (aged 75); Los Angeles, California, U.S.
- Occupations: Actor and lawyer
- Years active: 1925–1940

D'Arcy Corrigan (2 January 1870 – 25 December 1945) was an Irish lawyer who became an American film character actor.

== Life and career ==
D'Arcy Corrigan was born in County Cork, playing over 50 film roles from 1925–1945. His early career included a stint as private secretary for a member of Parliament and as a stock company leading man. Corrigan had a distinguished appearance with his wrinkled, gaunt face; his roles typically were very brief but memorable.

Corrigan was memorable as the odd morgue-keeper in Bela Lugosi's Murders in the Rue Morgue (1932) and as a blind man in The Informer (1935) by John Ford. He portrayed the ominously silent, darkly shrouded Spirit of Christmas Future in the popular 1938 MGM film A Christmas Carol. Most of his later roles were mostly small and uncredited, such as Cary Grant's superior Professor LaTouche in the first scene of Bringing Up Baby.

== Last years and death ==
Corrigan retired from acting widely in 1940 (except for one small role in Adventure in 1945) and died on Christmas Day in 1945, in Los Angeles, aged 75.

== Filmography ==
=== Credited ===
- Double Action Daniels (1925) - Richard Booth
- Lady Robinhood (1925) - Padre
- Ella Cinders (1926) - Editor
- Tarzan and the Golden Lion (1927) - Weesimbo
- Wild Geese (1927) - Mr. Klovatz
- Napoleon's Barber (1928, Short) - Tailor
- The Last Warning (1928) - John Woodford
- The Man from Blankley's (1930) - Mr. Ditchwater
- Murders in the Rue Morgue (1932) - Morgue Keeper
- The Informer (1935) - The Blind Man
- Rosia de Francia (1935) - El inquisidor general
- Mary of Scotland (1936) - Kirkcaldy
- The Plough and the Stars (1936) - Priest
- All Over Town (1937) - Davenport
- A Christmas Carol (1938) - Spirit of Christmas Future
- The Man in the Iron Mask (1939) - Tortured Prisoner
- The Great Commandment (1939) - Blind Man

=== Uncredited ===
- The Merry Widow (1925) - Horatio
- My Old Dutch (1926) - Minor Role
- Exit Smiling (1926) - Macomber
- The Man Who Laughs (1928) - Minor Role
- Law and Order (1932) - Undertaker Parker
- Diplomaniacs (1933) - Ship's Passenger
- Morning Glory (1933) - Minor Role
- The Invisible Man (1933) - Villager
- We Live Again (1934) - Juror
- Clive of India (1935) - Merchant
- Mystery of Edwin Drood (1935) - Opium Addict
- I'll Love You Always (1935) - Waiter
- Bride of Frankenstein (1935) - Procession Leader
- The Arizonian (1935) - Actor Playing Hamlet
- Steamboat Round the Bend (1935) - Hangman
- Metropolitan (1935) - Broken Down Actor
- A Feather in Her Hat (1935) - Cockney Man
- Klondike Annie (1936) - Missionary
- Show Boat (1936) - Minor Role
- Fatal Lady (1936) - Brazilian Opera Troupe
- Ramona (1936) - Jeff
- Lloyd's of London (1936) - Chimney Sweep
- The Road Back (1937) - Cab Driver
- Parnell (1937) - Irish Party Committeeman
- The Prisoner of Zenda (1937) - Traveler
- It Happened in Hollywood (1937) - Shakespearean Actor
- Stage Door (1937) - Minor Role
- Conquest (1937) - Priest
- Merry-Go-Round of 1938 (1937) - Actor
- Frisco-Express (1937) - Preacher
- Wise Girl (1937) - Flute Seller
- Bringing Up Baby (1938) - Professor LaTouche
- Goodbye Broadway (1938) - Shakespearean Character
- The Adventures of Robin Hood (1938) - Villager
- The Toy Wife (1938) - Suitor
- $1,000 a Touchdown (1939) - Cecil
- The Night of Nights (1939) - Actor
- Adventure (1945) - Man in Library (final film role)
