= Sidney Fox =

American actress (1907–1942)

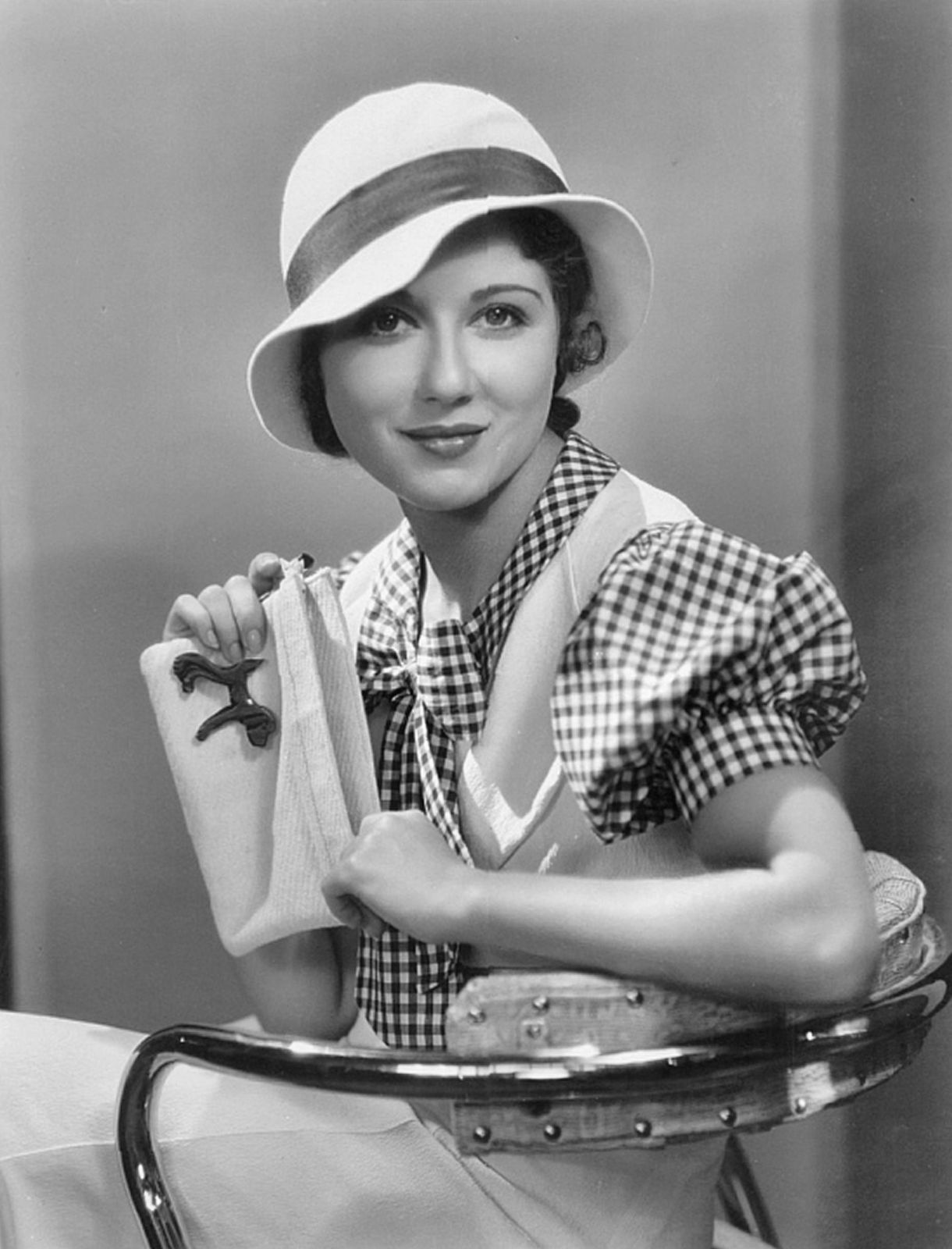
- Fox in 1934
- Born: Sarah Liefer; December 10, 1907; Galicia, Austria-Hungary (present-day Ukraine)
- Died: November 15, 1942 (aged 34); Los Angeles, California, U.S.
- Resting place: Mount Lebanon Cemetery, Glendale, New York
- Years active: 1929–1937
- Spouse: Charles Beahan (m.1932)

Sidney Fox (born Sarah Liefer; December 10, 1907 – November 15, 1942) was an American stage and film actress in the late 1920s and 1930s. Fox's Hollywood film debut was in Universal Pictures' 1931 production Bad Sister, which is notable for also being the first film of actress Bette Davis.

== Early life ==
Sarah Liefer was born in 1907 in "Poland-Galicia". In 1911, she emigrated with her Jewish parents — Rucha Rose (née Szapiro) and Jacob Liefer—to New York, where, by 1920, her mother had remarried. Rose's second husband was Joseph Fox, who identified himself in government records as a Yiddish-speaking native of Poland. After her mother's marriage to Fox, Sidney adopted her step-father's surname, although the federal census of 1930 shows her younger brother Samuel continued to use his given last name, Liefer, in the Fox household. The census documents that in April that year, 22-year-old Sidney was living with her mother and stepfather on the 500 block of West 178th Street in Manhattan, along with Samuel and their two stepbrothers. Sidney identified herself then professionally as a stenographer, while during any spare time, she was busy pursuing roles in stage productions. Additional sources regarding Fox's early life indicate she was employed in an array of other jobs as well, including work as a seamstress, a secretary in a law firm, and as a model or "mannequin" in a shop on Fifth Avenue.

== Stage and film career ==
By the late 1920s, Fox had begun studying acting to establish a stage or film career. She temporarily joined a touring theatrical company around 1928, and within a year, she was performing on Broadway. She had a role in It Never Rains in 1929, and the next year, she portrayed the character Rhoda Wampas in the comedy Lost Sheep. In May 1930, the theatre critic for Variety gave Lost Sheep a lukewarm review but complimented Fox's energetic performance in the play, noting "That little cutie Sidney Fox, who first came out in It Never Rains, pleased again with her Rhoda." Someone else in the audience was impressed with Fox, Carl Laemmle Jr., then head of production at Universal Studios. Laemmle soon signed her to a multi-year contract with the Hollywood film company.

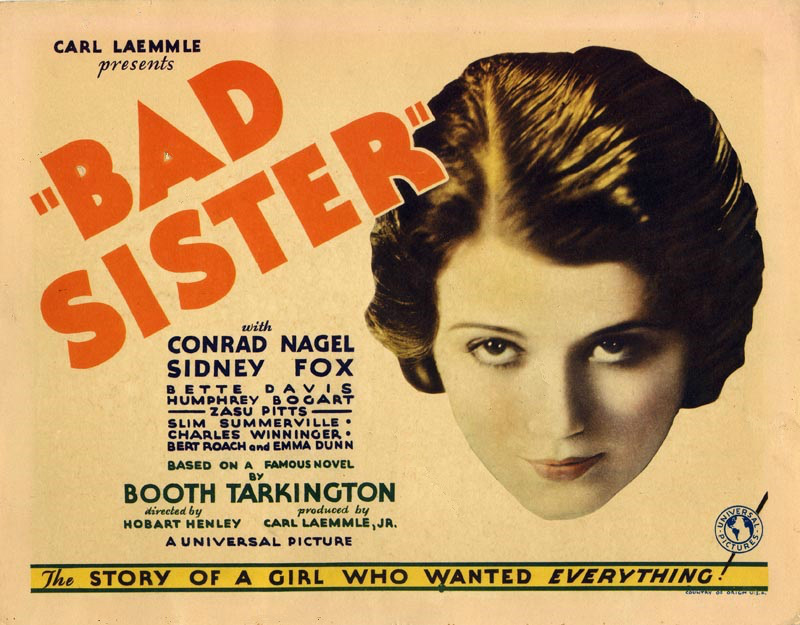
Lobby card for Bad Sister, 1931

Fox made her film debut in the 1931 Hobart Henley drama Bad Sister, playing opposite Conrad Nagel, Humphrey Bogart, Zasu Pitts, and Bette Davis, who was making her movie debut as well. In 1931, Sidney was selected by motion picture advertisers as a WAMPAS Baby Star, recognizing her as one of the film industry's most promising new actresses. The next year, she starred as Madamoiselle Camille L'Espanaye in the Robert Florey film Murders in the Rue Morgue opposite Bela Lugosi. Then, in 1933, she played opposite operatic bass Feodor Chaliapin in the English-language version of Don Quixote. Many of her subsequent roles were bit parts in B-movies, although she did have a starring role in the 1935 release School for Girls.

== Personal life and death ==
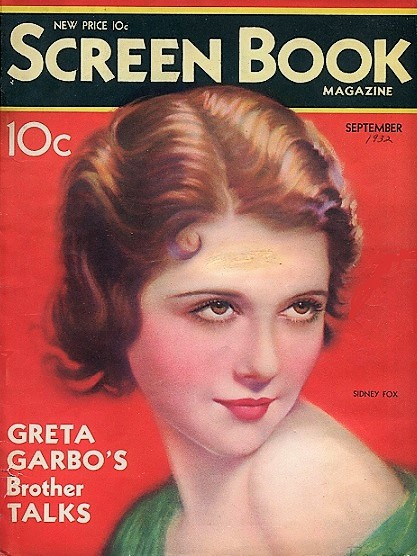
Fox on the cover of the fan magazine Screen Book, September 1932

Fox's relationship with studio executive Carl Laemmle Jr. as his mistress was one of Hollywood's open secrets for several years. In December 1932, however, she wed Charles Beahan (1903–1968), and they remained married until her death. By 1940, according to that year's federal census, Charles and Sidney Beahan were residing together in a $125-a-month rented home at 9421 Charleville Drive in Beverly Hills, California. Fox is listed in that census as having no occupation and "not seeking employment" in 1940, and Beahan is documented as being employed as a "Literary Agent/Stage & Motion Pic[ture]s".

Two years later, on November 15, 1942, Fox died in Hollywood from an overdose of sleeping pills that authorities ruled "an accident". Variety announced her death before this ruling in its issue of November 18. In the paper's brief obituary, Fox's given age, and the date of her death differ from those documented in official government records and on her gravestone in New York:

Sidney Fox, 31, a former stage and film actress, was found dead in her bed in her Hollywood home Nov. 14. Cause of death undetermined. Carl Laemmle discovered Miss Fox in 1930 while appearing in the Broadway production of Lost Sheep at the Selwyn theatre. She achieved quick film success, being first named a Wampas Baby Star, then scoring heavily in Strictly Dishonorable. Roles in Bad Sister, Mouthpiece and Once in a Lifetime followed, with a part in the French version of Don Quixote, starring Feodor Chaliapin, sandwiched in-between. In 1937 she replaced Katherine Locke on the New York stage in Having a Wonderful Time at the Lyceum theatre. Husband Charles Beahan, an agent, survives.

When Sidney died, Charles was reported to live at 519 North Crescent Drive in Beverly Hills. Following the coroner's investigation of her death, her body was returned to New York City and interred at Mount Lebanon Cemetery in Glendale, Queens.

== Filmography ==
Sidney Fox's final work of her film career consisted of last-minute retakes she performed in early August 1934 to complete the production of the musical comedy Down to Their Last Yacht before its release on August 31, 1934. Another film in which she starred, School for Girls, was completed before Down to Their Last Yacht, but this dramatic film was not released in the United States until February 19, 1935. Therefore, Down to Their Last Yacht includes Fox's final performance on film, but School for Girls is her final film to be released.

Year	Title	Role	Notes
1931	Bad Sister	Marianne Madison	
1931	Six Cylinder Love	Marilyn Sterling	
1931	Nice Women	Beth Girard	
1931	Strictly Dishonorable	Isabelle Perry	
1932	Murders in the Rue Morgue	Mlle. Camille L'Espanaye	
1932	The Mouthpiece	Celia Farraday	
1932	The Cohens and Kellys in Hollywood	Herself	
1932	Once in a Lifetime	Susan Walker	
1932	Afraid to Talk	Peggy Martin	
1933	Don Quixote	Maria, the niece	
1933	The Merry Monarch	Queen of the Day	
1933	Roi Pausole	Diana	
1934	Call it Murder	Stella Weldon	
1934	School for Girls	Annette Edlridge	
1934	Down to Their Last Yacht	Linda Colt-Stratton	

== See also ==
- List of unsolved deaths
