= Midnight (1934 film) =

1934 film noir directed by Chester Erskine

- DVD cover
- Directed by: Chester Erskine
- Written by: Chester Erskine
- Based on: Midnight; 1930 play by Paul Sifton; Claire Sifton
- Produced by: Chester Erskine
- Starring: Sidney Fox; Henry Hull; Margaret Wycherly; Humphrey Bogart
- Cinematography: William O. Steiner; George Webber
- Edited by: Leo Zochling
- Production company: All Star Productions
- Distributed by: Universal Pictures
- Release date: March 7, 1934 (U.S.)
- Running time: 76 min.
- Country: United States
- Language: English
- Budget: $50,000

Midnight is a 1934 American Pre-Code drama film, the first directed by Chester Erskine, and starring Sidney Fox, O.P. Heggie, Henry Hull and Margaret Wycherly. It was based on the` Theatre Guild (New York, 29 December 1930) play with the same name by Claire Eunice (née Ginsburg) and Paul Field Sifton The film was produced for Universal and was shot on a modest budget of $50,000 at Thomas Edison Studios, which producer/director Chester Erskine had re-opened specifically for the shoot.

Humphrey Bogart had a supporting though key role. The film was re-released as Call It Murder by Screen Guild Productions (Guaranteed Pictures) in 1949 after Bogart became a star; he was given top billing, although he is present in few scenes and was credited eighth in the original release. Midnight is the tenth feature-length film Bogart appeared in. Midnight was one of the last Pre-Code films, having been released just four months before strict enforcement of the Hays Code on July 1, 1934.

== Plot ==
A woman named Ethel Saxton is on trial for shooting her husband to death; her defense is that she did not mean to kill him, but fired under extreme emotional pressure because she could not stand that he was leaving her. Spectators give her a decent chance to be let off because it was a crime of passion. But Edward Weldon, the jury foreman, asks her whether she picked up the money the husband had collected to leave with after she shot him, and when she says yes, he concludes, and influences the jury to find, that this means the crime was premeditated. She is convicted of first-degree murder and sentenced to death.

On the evening of Ethel's execution, Edward is dealing with the consequences of his role as foreman. Friends have come to the house to support the family, and are trying to distract Edward with bridge and chat, but reporters are clustered outside, and an unscrupulous journalist has bribed Weldon's son-in-law to let him set up a fake radio set in the house so he can play on Edward’s emotions with an exaggerated “broadcast” of the execution.

Weldon's daughter Stella met a charming man named Gar Boni at the trial and, in the ensuing weeks, has fallen madly in love with him. But he tells his friends that one reason he is leaving town tonight is that she is getting too serious and that is not his kind of romance. He comes to the house, and she begs him to stay or take her; she threatens to come to the train station at midnight if he does not return to say another goodbye. In the course of this, she notices that he is carrying a gun, which he says is for his work.

The journalist pretends to broadcast details of Ethel screaming and collapsing as she is led to the chair, though we see her, in intercut scenes, suffering and fearing but walking to her death with dignity. Edward, pressured by this and his feelings, opens his front door and gives the waiting reporters an emotional statement about how the law is the law and he did right. At the same moment, the switch is pulled at the death house, and a gun goes off where Stella and Gar are having their last argument in his car.

Stella comes into the house carrying Gar’s gun, and says she shot him. The rest of her family immediately starts finding excuses for her and telling Edward they must agree on a story to exculpate her. They want her to say Gar attacked her and she shot him in self-defense, and more than one pressures Edward to choose his daughter over “some moldy old laws” that everyone else breaks. But Weldon, though obviously torn between love for his daughter and his past pronouncements about the rule of law, contacts the district attorney to come to the house, and tells him the truth. Luckily, the D.A.’s men investigate the murder scene and find that the bullet that killed Gar came from another car across the street; he was the victim of a gangland rubout, not the crime of passion Stella thought she committed. She weeps in Edward’s arms as his agonizing dilemma is negated.

== Cast ==
- Sidney Fox ... Stella Weldon
- O.P. Heggie ... Edward Weldon
- Henry Hull ... Nolan
- Margaret Wycherly ... Mrs. Weldon
- Lynne Overman ... Joe Biggers (as Lynn Overman)
- Katherine Wilson ... Ada Biggers
- Richard Whorf ... Arthur Weldon
- Humphrey Bogart ... Gar Boni
- Granville Bates ... Henry McGrath
- Cora Witherspoon ... Elizabeth McGrath
- Moffat Johnston ... Dist. Atty. Plunkett
- Henry O'Neill ... Ingersoll (as Henry O'Neil)
- Helen Flint ... Ethel Saxon
