= School for Girls =

1935 film directed by William Nigh

- Directed by: William Nigh
- Written by: Reginald Wright Kauffman; Albert DeMond
- Produced by: M.H. Hoffman
- Starring: Sidney Fox; Paul Kelly; Lois Wilson
- Cinematography: Harry Neumann
- Edited by: Mildred Johnston
- Music by: Abe Meyer
- Production company: Liberty Pictures
- Distributed by: Liberty Pictures
- Release date: February 19, 1935
- Running time: 73 minutes
- Country: United States
- Language: English

School for Girls is a 1935 American drama film directed by William Nigh and starring Sidney Fox, Paul Kelly and Lois Wilson.

== Plot ==
After being convicted of stealing, a young woman is sent to a reformatory administered by a sadistic and corrupt woman. However, one of the board of trustees takes an interest in the new arrival and begins to investigate the management of the institution.

== Cast ==
- Sidney Fox as Annette Edlridge
- Paul Kelly as Garry Waltham
- Lois Wilson as Miss Cartwright
- Lucille La Verne as Miss Keeble
- Dorothy Lee as Dorothy Bosworth
- Toby Wing as Hazel Jones
- Dorothy Appleby as Florence Burns
- Lona Andre as Peggy
- Russell Hopton as Elliott Robbins, aka Buck Kreegar
- Barbara Weeks as Nell Davis
- Kathleen Burke as Gladys Deacon
- Anna Q. Nilsson as Dr. Anne Galvin
- Purnell Pratt as Inspector Jameson
- Robert Warwick as Governor
- William Farnum as Charles Waltham
- Charles Ray as Duke
- Mary Foy as Miss Gage
- Anne Shirley as Catherine Fogarty
- Myrtle Stedman as Mrs. Winters
- Eddie Kane as Ted
- Gretta Gould as Mrs. Smoot
- George Cleveland as Reeves
- Helene Chadwick as Larson
- Helen Foster as Eleanor
- Fred Kelsey as Detective
- Edward LeSaint as Judge
- Harry Woods as Detective
- Jack Kennedy as Hansen

== Bibliography ==
- Pitts, Michael R. Poverty Row Studios, 1929–1940: An Illustrated History of 55 Independent Film Companies, with a Filmography for Each. McFarland & Company, 2005.
