= Moffat Johnston =

Scottish actor (1886–1935)

- Born: August 18, 1886; Edinburgh, Scotland
- Died: November 3, 1935 (aged 49); Norwalk, Connecticut
- Other names: Moffat Johnson; Moffat Johnstone; J. Moffat Johnston
- Occupation: Actor
- Years active: 1905 - 1935
- Spouse: Winifred Durie Hodgson
- Children: Peter Johnston; Mary Rose Johnston

Moffat Johnston (1886–1935) was a Scottish-born actor with a substantial United States stage career.

== Career ==
Johnston was born to John Moffat Johnston and Margaret Parke (Boyd). He was educated at Watson's School and the University of Edinburgh. He made his stage debut in 1905 at Theatre Royal, Manchester in Frank Benson's company and went on with them to perform more than 200 Shakespearean roles. In 1914 he toured with his own theatre company in Germany before the outbreak of World War I. During the war he was a Lieutenant of the 8th Sherwood Foresters. He returned to theatrical work after the war making his American debut in 1922 in the world premier of George Bernard Shaw's Back to Methuselah. Johnston appeared in several important Broadway productions in the 1920s, such as Methuselah, R. U. R., Six Characters in Search of an Author and the 1923 production of John Barrymore's Hamlet.

During the summers of 1925, 1926, and 1927, Johnston was a member of the Elitch Theatre's Summer stock cast in Denver, Colorado.

Johnston created the role of Oscar Jaffe in the 1932 play Twentieth Century, which was later turned into a film and a musical. He also appeared with Lillian Gish in 1934's Within the Gates and his last role before his death in The Flowers of the Forest with Burgess Meredith and Katharine Cornell.

Moffat's wife Winifred, also an actor, occasionally appeared on Broadway in plays with him. She performed under the name Winifred Johnston in the 1923 production of King Lear and the 1931 productions of The Streets of New York, or Poverty is No Crime. Their son Peter Johnston also appeared on Broadway during the 1930s.

Moffat taught at Royal Academy of Dramatic Art in London.

Devoted to the stage, Johnston only appeared in two films: a 1911 Shakespearean silent Richard III starring Frank Benson and the 1934 sound drama Midnight.

He died after appendicitis surgery in 1935.

== Filmography ==
Year	Title	Role	Notes
1911	Richard III	Duke of Buckingham	Short
1934	Midnight	Dist. Atty. Plunkett	(final film role)
