= Broadway's Like That =

1929 film

- Starring: Ruth Etting
- Release date: December 1929
- Running time: 10 minutes

Broadway's Like That is a 1929 Vitaphone short film starring Ruth Etting, with Joan Blondell, Humphrey Bogart and Mary Philips.

== Plot ==
A girl who works in a music store is to be married that evening, but her fiancé tells her their marriage must be postponed. As she is dressing for a New Year's Eve party she is interrupted by a visitor — the wife of the man she had planned to marry.

== Production ==
Broadway's Like That (Vitaphone No. 960) was filmed in New York and released in December 1929. Ruth Etting stars with Joan Blondell, Humphrey Bogart and Mary Phillips. Etting's songs include "From the Bottom of My Heart" and "Right Kind of Man", by L. Wolfe Gilbert and Abel Baer.

== Film preservation ==
The Vitaphone disc soundtrack for this film is lost, only a sound print of the film survives, which was re-discovered by television syndication in 1963.
