= Bad Sister (1931 film) =

1931 film

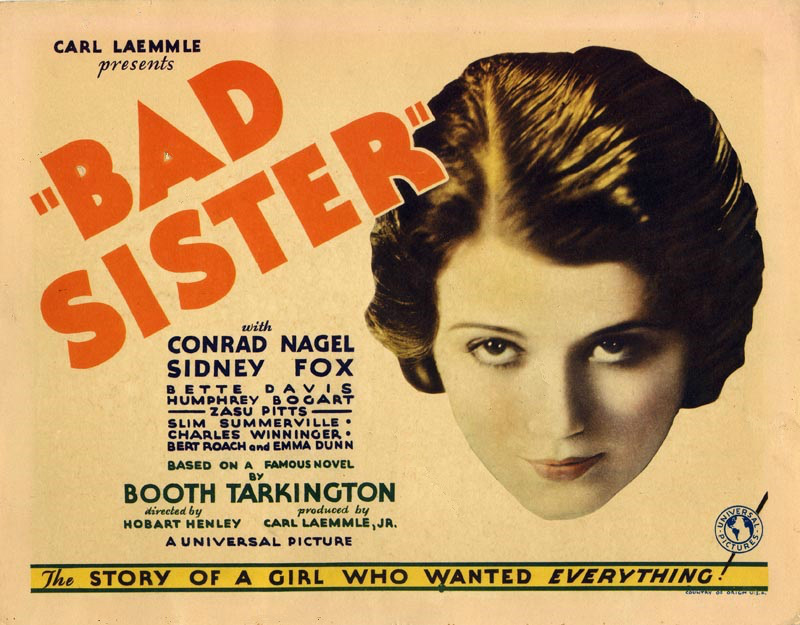
- Lobby card
- Directed by: Hobart Henley
- Screenplay by: Edwin H. Knopf; Tom Reed; Raymond L. Schrock
- Based on: The Flirt; 1913 novel by Booth Tarkington
- Produced by: Carl Laemmle Jr.
- Starring: Conrad Nagel; Sidney Fox; Bette Davis; ZaSu Pitts; Humphrey Bogart
- Cinematography: Karl Freund
- Edited by: Ted J. Kent
- Music by: David Broekman
- Production company: Universal Pictures
- Distributed by: Universal Pictures
- Release date: March 29, 1931
- Running time: 68 minutes
- Country: United States
- Language: English

Bad Sister (Note: The opening credits read The Bad Sister.) is a 1931 American pre-Code drama film directed by Hobart Henley. The screenplay by Edwin H. Knopf, Tom Reed, and Raymond L. Schrock is based on the 1913 novel The Flirt by Booth Tarkington, which had been filmed in 1916 and 1922.

The film marks the screen debuts of both Bette Davis and Sidney Fox (who was billed over Davis). The cast also includes Humphrey Bogart and ZaSu Pitts in supporting roles.

== Plot ==
Set in the 1930s, Marianne Madison, bored with her routine life, falls for dashing con artist Valentine Corliss, who has come to her small town looking for fresh marks to swindle. She has many suitors, including the desirable Dr. Lindley and the portly Mr. Trumbull. In a chance encounter, she meets Corliss when out on a date with Dr. Lindley, feigns to know Valentine, and leaves her date to head home with Valentine.

Corliss soon charms her into faking her well-respected father's signature on a letter of endorsement, which he presents to a small group of local merchants, who willingly give him money. Corliss then prepares his escape, but not before conning Marianne to leave with him with the promise of marriage.

Her sister Laura is sweet and unassuming, and she is in love with Dr. Lindley, who does not return her affections. Her younger brother hands her personal diary to Dr. Lindley when he visits the house to look after her father, who has collapsed after being berated by Marianne for not supporting Valentine without verifying him. Dr. Lindley is flustered and excuses himself. Laura burns her diary and with it her hopes of marrying him.

Meanwhile, after spending a night together in his Columbus hotel room, Valentine abandons Marianne.

Angry, ashamed, no longer a maiden—and unmarried—she returns home and announces to her jilted fiancé Dr. Lindley that she will now marry him. However, she has toyed with him too much, and he informs her that he has fallen in love with her shy younger sister Laura and that he no longer returns her affections.

All is not lost; after confessing to her father and the duped investors, Marianne accepts wealthy but portly Wade Trumbull's marriage proposal. Trumbull bails her father completely out of his debt, and during their first year of marriage, Marianne comes to be genuinely fond of him.

== Cast ==
- Conrad Nagel as Dr Dick Lindley
- Sidney Fox as Marianne Madison
- Bette Davis as Laura Madison
- Humphrey Bogart as Valentine Corliss
- Charles Winninger as Mr Madison
- Emma Dunn as Mrs Madison
- ZaSu Pitts as Minnie (the Madison family servant)
- Slim Summerville as Sam
- Bert Roach as Wade Trumbull
- David Durand as Hedrick Madison (Marianne and Laura's kid brother)

== Production and release notes ==
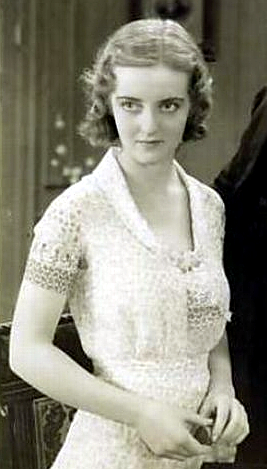
Bette Davis in Bad Sister

The original title for Bad Sister during production was What a Flirt and then briefly changed to Gambling Daughters just before the film's nationwide release.

Bette Davis, nervous about her appearance in her first feature film, consulted with studio makeup chief Jack Pierce, who "surveyed me critically, almost resentfully," she recalled for an interview in the April 1938 issue of Good Housekeeping. "Your eyelashes are too short, hair's a nondescript color, and mouth's too small. A fat little Dutch girl's face, and a neck that's too long," he told her. He suggested a different shade of lipstick and advised her to use eye shadow, but their meeting left Davis feeling anxious and lacking self-confidence. After seeing the completed film, producer Carl Laemmle Jr. commented, "Can you imagine some poor guy going through hell and high water and ending up with her at the fade-out?"

Davis was required to change a baby in one scene, and the fact the infant was a boy was kept secret from her. When she undid the diaper and saw male genitals for the first time in her life, she was so embarrassed her face reddened enough to look deep gray for on the production's black-and-white film.

Davis and her mother attended a preview of the film in San Bernardino, California. The actress was reportedly so distressed by her performance that they left before the final credits. Certain her Hollywood career was over, she cried all the way home.

== Preservation ==
Bad Sister has been preserved in the Library of Congress collection.
