= Bert Roach =

American actor (1891–1971)

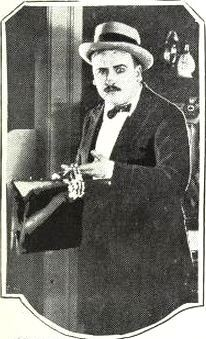
- Roach in The Black Bag (1922)
- Born: August 21, 1891; Washington, D.C., U.S.
- Died: February 16, 1971 (aged 79); Los Angeles, California, U.S.
- Occupation: Actor
- Years active: 1914–1951

Egbert Roach (August 21, 1891 – February 16, 1971) was an American film actor. He appeared in more than 320 films between 1914 and 1951. He was born in Washington, D.C., and died in Los Angeles, California, age 79.

== Selected filmography ==
- Fatty's Magic Pants (1914 short) - Party Guest (uncredited)
- Yankee Doodle in Berlin (1919) - Von Hindenburg
- Salome vs. Shenandoah (1919) - Actor/Soldier
- Down on the Farm (1920) - Roach - the Farmer
- Married Life (1920) - Minor Role (uncredited)
- A Small Town Idol (1921) - Martin Brown
- The Rowdy (1921) -Howard Morse
- The Millionaire (1921) - Bobo Harmsworth
- The Black Bag (1922) - Mulready
- The Flirt (1922) - Wade Trumble
- A Lady of Quality (1924) - Sir Christopher Crowell
- The Storm Daughter (1924) - Olaf Swensen
- Excitement (1924) - Toby
- High Speed (1924) - Dick Farrell
- The Turmoil (1924) - Minor Role (uncredited)
- Don't (1925)
- The Denial (1925)
- Money Talks (1926)
- The Flaming Forest (1926)
- The Taxi Dancer (1927)
- Tillie the Toiler (1927)
- The Battle of the Century (1927)
- Wickedness Preferred (1928)
- The Crowd (1928)
- Under the Black Eagle (1928)
- Riders of the Dark (1928)
- Honeymoon (1928)
- Young Nowheres (1929)
- So Long Letty (1929)
- The Show of Shows (1929)
- No No Nanette (1930)
- Hold Everything (1930)
- Bad Sister (1931)
- Six Cylinder Love (1931)
- Murders in the Rue Morgue (1932)
- Impatient Maiden (1932)
- Night World (1932)
- Bird of Paradise (1932)
- The Pride of the Legion (1932)
- Hallelujah, I'm a Bum (1933)
- Secret Sinners (1933)
- Daring Daughters (1933)
- Easy Millions (1933)
- Half a Sinner (1934)
- Marrying Widows (1934)
- Guard That Girl (1935)
- Here Comes The Band (1935)
- San Francisco (1936)
- Prescription for Romance (1937)
- Mannequin (1937)
- Algiers (1938)
- Romance on the Run (1938)
- The Man in the Iron Mask (1939)
- Mardi Gras (1943)
- The Strange Love of Martha Ivers (1946)
- Decoy (1946)
- The Time, the Place and the Girl (1946)
- The Perils of Pauline (1947)
- Dick Tracy Meets Gruesome (1947)
