= Graham Petrie (writer) =

Scottish-Canadian academic and writer (1939–2023)

Graham Petrie (December 10, 1939 – December 9, 2023) was a Scottish-Canadian academic and writer. He was a literature and film studies professor at McMaster University in Hamilton, Ontario.

Petrie was born in Penang, British Malaya, to Scottish parents and was raised and educated primarily in Scotland. He initially joined McMaster University as a professor of English, with his academic focus evolving toward film during his time with the institution.

In addition to his academic works, Petrie published the novel Seahorse in 1980, and was a shortlisted nominee for the Books in Canada First Novel Award in 1981. In 1996, Soho Press published his second novel The Siege simultaneously with a reissue of Seahorse. He also published the short story "Village Theatre" in John Robert Colombo's 1981 anthology Not to Be Taken at Night.

Petrie died on December 9, 2023, at the age of 83.

== Bibliography ==
=== Nonfiction ===
- Petrie, Graham (1970). The Cinema of François Truffaut. New York, NY: A.S. Barnes. ISBN 9780498076497.
- — (1981). History Must Answer to Man: The Contemporary Hungarian Cinema (2nd ed.). Budapest, Hungary: Corvina Kiadó. ISBN 9789631313048.
- — (1985). Hollywood Destinies: European Directors in America, 1922–1931. London, UK: Routledge & Kegan Paul. ISBN 9780710201614.
- Petrie, Graham & Ruth Dwyer (1990). Before the Wall Came Down: Soviet and East European Filmmakers Working in the West. Lanham, MD: University Press of America. ISBN 9780819178596.
- Johnston, Vida T. & Graham Petrie (1994). The Films of Andrei Tarkovsky: A Visual Fugue. Bloomington, IN: Indiana University Press.

=== Fiction ===
- Petrie, Graham (1980). Seahorse. London, UK: Constable. ISBN 9780094637108.
- — (July 1981). "Bars : an aspect of night life". F&SF. 61 (1): 102–110.
- — (1996). The Siege. New York, NY: Soho Press. ISBN 9781569470763.
