= A Lost Lady (disambiguation) =

A Lost Lady is a 1923 book by Willa Cather.

A Lost Lady may also refer to:

- A Lost Lady (1924 film), an American drama film based on the book
- A Lost Lady (1934 film), based on the book
- The Lost Lady: A Tragy Comedy, a 1637 play by William Berkeley

== See also ==
- Laapataa Ladies, or Lost Ladies, a 2023 Indian comedy drama film
