= Gertie de S. Wentworth-James =

British writer

Gertrude Soilleux Wentworth-James
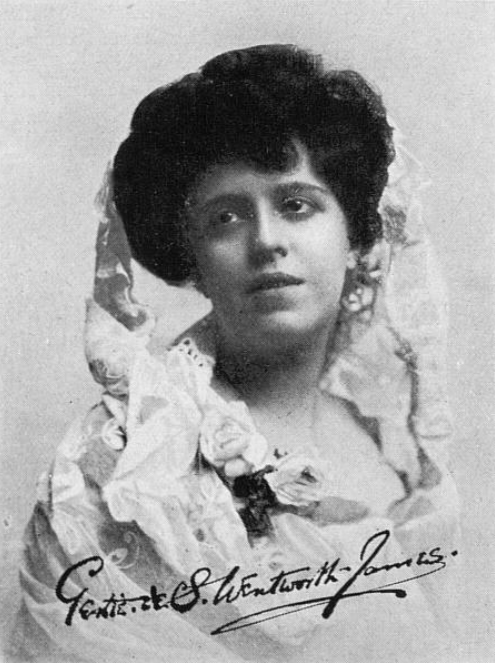
- Wentworth-James in 1908
- Born: Gertrude Soilleux Webster; March 29, 1874; Kensington, Middlesex, England
- Died: April 22, 1933 (aged 60)
- Occupation: Author
- Spouse: Herbert Wentworth-James (married 1904)
- Writing career
- Years active: 1901–1929
- Genre: Romance
- Notable works: The Scarlet Kiss (1909); House of Chance (1912); The Girl Who Wouldn't Work (1913); The Wife Who Wasn't Wanted (1923)

Gertrude Soilleux Wentworth-James (29 March 1874 – 22 April 1933), better known by variations of her pen name Gertie de S. Wentworth-James, was a British columnist and novelist. She primarily authored romance novels, though her writing extended into science fiction and fantasy. In her lifetime, she produced over 50 books, several of which were adapted as films or plays.

== Early life ==
Wentworth-James was born Gertrude Soilleux Webster in Kensington, Middlesex (now a borough of London). Her mother, Emilie Webster, was widowed by the time Gertrude was seven years old.

Gertrude began training as a pianist at a young age and was considered a child prodigy by her teachers. At 11 years old, she performed under August Manns at Crystal Palace. However, as she would later inform the editor of the Royal Magazine, she "never cared for music" and opted not to pursue it professionally as an adult.

=== Career and marriage ===
At the turn of the 20th century, Gertrude Webster was employed by Smedley's Hydro, a hydropathic spa in Matlock, Derbyshire, owned by the Smedley family. She wrote and performed comedic sketches to entertain the resort's guests.

In 1904, she married Herbert Wentworth-James, a journalist, and took his surname. Herbert was described as "devoted" to his wife and "always" carried a photograph of her in his pocket.

== Literary career ==
Wentworth-James began her writing career in the early 1900s by submitting non-fiction articles and short stories to publications including The English Illustrated Magazine, The Lady's Realm, and Cassell's Magazine. She also wrote a one-act play, The Cure that Failed, in 1905.

Her debut novel, The Wild Widow, was published in 1908 in the United Kingdom by Thomas Werner Laurie, and in the United States by the Empire Book Company. Laurie would remain her primary publisher throughout her career. Bystander reviewed her debut positively, dubbing Wentworth-James' writing "clever in a new-womanish sort of way" and replete with "witty and suggestive" dialogue. The Bookman was less complimentary, describing the story as one of "exceedingly unpleasant people... narrated in an exceedingly unpleasant style".

In 1909, Wentworth-James published Pink Purity, which would later be described by the Daily Herald and Liverpool Daily Post as among the "best known" of her career. The novel, which featured an early example of a flapper protagonist, involved sexual themes and depicted young women engaging in crime. Owing to its substance, Pink Purity was described as a "most objectionable book" by The Clarion. In 1914, the Daily Mirror's anonymous gossip columnist, The Rambler, would credit Pink Purity with having "really popularised" the term 'flapper.'

Wentworth-James' 1911 work, The Cage Unbarred, was highlighted by the New York Times as one of the earliest novels to feature aviation. She dedicated the book, which featured the relationship between a married woman and a pilot, to pioneering aviator Claude Grahame-White. Grahame-White reacted with amusement upon learning of the tribute and that the book's leading man was likely based on him: "Not guilty... but I must certainly get a copy."

In early 1917, Wentworth-James' primary publisher, T. W. Laurie, launched a series of full-length novels costing 2½ shillings, undercutting the market rate of six shillings for similar works. Wentworth-James' detective novel, Golden Youth, served as the first entry in a line inspired by yellow-back publications.

Wentworth-James briefly ran an agony aunt column in the Sunday Express in 1921, offering readers advice on romantic and social problems. By this time, she had released over 50 novels through publishers including Hurst and Blackett, Charles William Daniel, and Alston Rivers. The Sporting Times ran short stories by Wentworth-James throughout 1925.

Though primarily an author of romances, Wentworth-James also wrote works of science fiction. Her 1925 novel, Mr. Lynke, focused thematically on missing links in human evolution. The Television Girl (1928) featured the use of telephones with screens broadcasting in real time, and followed the romance between an osteopath and a woman whose number he dials by mistake. Described as the first British novel to explore television technology by media scholar Jamie Medhurst, modern commentators have drawn comparisons between devices envisioned in The Television Girl and videoconferencing software or online dating.

From 1929 onwards, Wentworth-James largely ceased writing. At the time of her death in 1933, she had published "about fifty-five" novels under her name, with several translated into languages including Dutch, Swedish, Spanish, and French. She was associated in popular culture with alliterative titles.

== Reception ==
=== 20th century reception ===
During her lifetime, Wentworth-James' work attracted a mixed reception from critics. In 1911, she was described as both an author of "smart" novels (New York Times) and a merchant of "dreary drivel" (The Smart Set). Wentworth-James attracted a readership for her genre fiction, as the Sunday Dispatch summarised in 1917: "[A] large public... eagerly accepts [her] formulae for the construction of 'passion and tears'." On her own work, Wentworth-James remarked: "I don't write what is called 'the healthy novel'... Indeed, I don't like healthy novels. Those I have read always deal with murder, robbery, blackmail, and abductions. It's wonderful what a lot of crime it takes to make a really 'healthy' work of fiction."

Kaikhosru Shapurji Sorabji deemed Wentworth-James' books to belong to a "parade of tasteless" alongside the works of Ethel M. Dell and Florence L. Barclay. Allan Turpin, Henry Williamson, and John Moray Stuart-Young compared Wentworth-James to Elinor Glyn, though Turpin deemed Wentworth-James' works to be more risqué. (Wentworth-James was acquainted with Glyn, having attended the British trade show premiere of The Woman Who Did alongside her in 1915.) A character in Geoffrey Gorer's 1936 novel, Nobody Talks Politics, describes Wentworth-James as writing with "surprising directness and vigour", and groups her works with Ruby M. Ayres.

Her work influenced novelist Ursula Bloom.

=== Legacy ===
Wentworth-James' works quickly fell out of commercial favour after her death. T. E. B. Clarke, writing for Punch in the latter half of the 20th century, cited her novels as examples of obscure or outdated genre fiction. Nonetheless, reflecting on her career in the 21st century, The Oxford Companion to Edwardian Fiction assessed Wentworth-James' books as "smartly witty" and "self-consciously progressive... especially about sex". Literary academics David Trotter and Jamie Medhurst categorise Wentworth-James' works as "bodice rippers".

== Adaptations ==
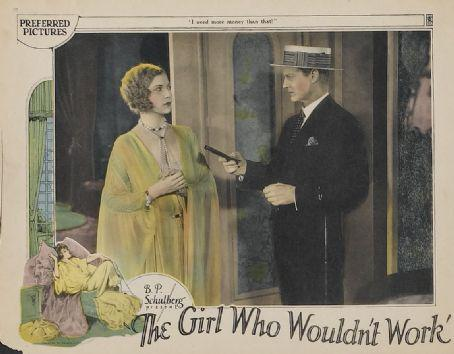
Movie poster for The Girl Who Wouldn't Work (1925), based on Wentworth-James' 1923 novel.

Several of Wentworth-James' novels were adapted for other mediums, the first of which was The Devil's Profession (1914). The story of a mad scientist's experiments formed the basis of a 1915 silent film. The Scarlet Kiss (1909), a sports novel, became a film of the same name in 1920, although libraries in London declined to carry the novel itself due to concerns with its controversial material. Directed by Fred Goodwins, The Scarlet Kiss starred Maud Cressall, Philip Hewland and Marjorie Hume. As of 2026, both The Devil's Profession and The Scarlet Kiss are not featured in the archive of the British Film Institute; the institute estimates that between 75 and 90 per cent of British silent films produced before 1930 "are lost".

A play based on Wentworth-James' 1917 novel, The Piccadilly Puritan, opened in 1923. The production, which starred Dorothy Minto and James Lindsay, received generally poor reviews, with the Sunday Express opining that the "acting all round was superior to the [play's] lines" and story.

Two of Wentworth-James' works were turned into films in 1925. The Girl Who Wouldn't Work, based on Wentworth-James' eponymous 1913 novel, was produced by B. P. Schulberg and starred Lionel Barrymore alongside Marguerite De La Motte. The Wife Who Wasn't Wanted, adapted by Bess Meredyth from Wentworth-James' 1923 eponymous novel, was produced by Warner Bros. Pictures and directed by James Flood. It starred Irene Rich in a storyline influenced by the 1922 trial of Herbert Rowse Armstrong. As of 2016, The Wife Who Wasn't Wanted is considered lost by the National Film Preservation Board.

In 1933, Equitable Pictures adapted Wentworth-James' 1913 crime novel, House of Chance. The film, starring Thelma Todd, was initially released in the United States as Cheating Blondes, and re-released in 1952 under the name Girls in Trouble. It follows twin sisters (both played by Todd), one of whom masquerades as the other after being wrongfully suspected of murder. The movie is extant as of the early 21st century.

== Personal life and death ==
=== Personal life and interests ===
Wentworth-James spent most of her life in London. She remained in the city during the German air campaign on London during the First World War. After hostilities ended, she recalled "cower[ing] in the tube during air raids".

Wentworth-James was described by her contemporary Gilbert Frankau as "a charming woman whose racy novels entirely belied her own pure character". She owned two black cats in the early 20th century, which she named Weenie and Claude, and also kept a habit of rescuing strays. Among her hobbies were billiards and waltzing. An admirer of the works of Willy Clarkson, she dedicated a chapter of her 1913 book The House of Chance to him.

=== Social and political views ===
To-day woman has fearlessly laid aside so many of the frills and furbelows which used to deck her person that there can be no doubt about her being equally ready to lay aside the frills and furbelows which used to deck her mind.

— Wentworth-James, The Gentlewoman, 29 September 1917

Wentworth-James' views on gender equality were both typical of her period and progressive for the time. Though she believed that marriages were happier when women had a degree of financial independence, she nonetheless considered marriage itself to be "the best career for every woman", provided the union was "tolerably happy". In 1917, Wentworth-James entered the public debate surrounding the high-profile prosecution of Douglas Malcolm, a British Army officer who killed his wife's affair partner and claimed he had done so to protect her "honour". Wentworth-James' views mirrored those of suffragettes Nina Boyle and Sylvia Pankhurst:

"Every woman is completely the mistress of her own destiny, which may, in this sense, be called inclination so far as matters of love and passion are concerned. No woman, unless forced, yields anything to a man unless she wants to. This being the case, the very idea of a woman needing any assistance in the defence of her honour seems as grotesque as the exploits of a hero in a melodrama who, single-handed, wipes out a large detachment of a fully armed enemy."

Throughout the First World War, Wentworth-James grew concerned with Britain's birth rate. Her 1918 novel, The Child Market, was described as "[p]ropaganda" to that end "masked as romance" in a review by The Evening News. Though the reviewer received the book's "remarks upon the subject of re-population" favourably, they felt there was "little merit... in the tale, as a tale".

A Christian, Wentworth-James described herself as "disgracefully superstitious" and expressed an interest in Christian Science. She promoted the pseudoscientific field of osteopathy and served as a brand ambassador for Sanatogen, claiming the tonic of primarily milk protein changed her "from a suicidal pessimist into an insistent optimist". Some of her views were reminiscent of prosperity theology: she believed that deserving persons attracted wealth and that "reckless, self-indulgent, or dishonest" people were incapable of remaining affluent.

Wentworth-James held racist colonial attitudes that were common in Britain during her lifetime. In a 1904 column on Nigeria for The English Illustrated Magazine, she described local customs as "barbaric". A negative review in The Bookseller of her novel Pink Purity (1909) criticised its use of "cheap and trite" jokes based on Jewish stereotypes.

=== Death ===
On the morning of 22 April 1933, Wentworth-James felt unwell and was visited at her home by a physician. The doctor advised that she only needed bed rest, and her husband, Herbert, left for the day on business. Upon returning in the evening, Herbert found their house's front door difficult to open, and ultimately discovered the body of his wife in the hallway. It was concluded that Wentworth-James was attempting to venture outside for help when she died. She was 60 years old and left an estate valued at £151 and sixpence (equivalent to £9,346 in 2025).

Herbert subsequently experienced ailing health and depression. He was found deceased at his home in September 1933 in a room full of coal gas. An inquest led by Samuel Ingleby Oddie concluded that Herbert had died by suicide due to grief following Wentworth-James' passing the previous year.

== Selected bibliography ==
- The Wild Widow (1908) — debut novel published by T. Werner Laurie
- Pink Purity (1909) — published by John Laurie and described by media outlets as one of the "best known" of her career
- The Scarlet Kiss: The Story of a Degenerate Woman Who Drifted (1909) — adapted into a silent film
- House of Chance (1911) — published by Everett and Co; adapted for screen as Cheating Blondes and reissued as A Primrose Prude in 1919
- The Soul that Came Back (1912) — a novel centring around reincarnation
- The Devil's Profession (1913) — became a silent film
- The Girl Who Wouldn't Work (1913) — adapted into a silent film
- Green Grapes: Dealing with the Devilish Doings of a God (1918) — the story of a woman enthralled by Bacchus
- A Very Bad Woman (1919) — published through Laurie
- The Wife Who Wasn't Wanted (1923) — adapted into a silent film
