= Trailing the Killer =

1932 film

- Directed by: Herman C. Raymaker
- Written by: Jackson Richards
- Produced by: Charles J. Hunt (associate producer); B.F. Zeidman (producer)
- Starring: See below
- Cinematography: Pliny Goodfriend
- Music by: Oscar Potoker
- Distributed by: Sono Art-World Wide Pictures
- Release date: October 16, 1932
- Running time: 65 minutes
- Country: United States
- Language: English

Trailing the Killer, also known as Call of the Wilderness and Lobo, is a 1932 American film directed by Herman C. Raymaker and released by Sono Art-World Wide Pictures.

== Plot ==
A dog is in pursuit of a mountain lion and encounters various adventures, including killing a rattlesnake, along the way.

== Cast ==
- Caesar the Dog as Lobo
- Francis McDonald as Pierre LaPlant
- Heinie Conklin as Windy
- Joe De La Cruz as Pedro
- Pedro Regas as Manuel
- Tom London as Sheriff
