= The Man Upstairs (1926 film) =

1926 film

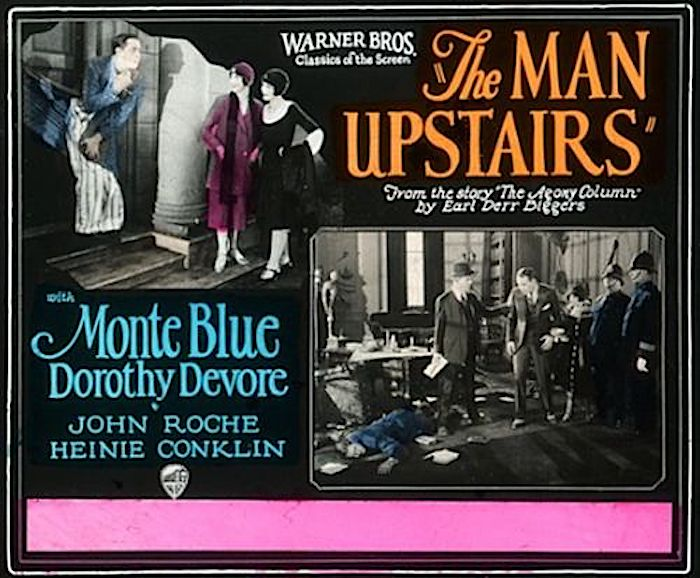
- Lantern slide
- Directed by: Roy Del Ruth
- Written by: Edward T. Lowe, Jr.
- Based on: The Agony Column by Earl Derr Biggers
- Produced by: Warner Brothers
- Starring: Monte Blue
- Cinematography: Allan Thompson
- Distributed by: Warner Bros.
- Release date: January 22, 1926
- Running time: 7 reels
- Country: United States
- Language: Silent (English intertitles)
- Budget: $51,000
- Box office: $180,000

The Man Upstairs is a 1926 American silent comedy film directed by Roy Del Ruth and starring Monte Blue. It was produced and distributed by Warner Bros. The film is based on the 1916 novel The Agony Column by Earl Derr Biggers.

== Plot ==
As described in a film magazine review, adventurer and traveler Geoffrey West has a passion for "The Agony Column" of the newspaper, which lists advertisements for missing friends and relatives, and uses the personals to get acquainted with Marion Larnard, whom he sees in a London hotel. She invites him to write her a daily letter for five days to prove whether his acquaintance is worth cultivating. Taking this as his cue, in these letters he begins a mystery story to show her that he is an interesting fellow and leads her to believe that he has murdered Captain Fraser-Freer until she understands that it was intended as an elaborate joke on her. Marion then, with the aid of the army officer who pretends to be dead, turns the table on Geoffrey and gives him a scare in return by having him arrested and put in jail. However, just as he is about to be charged, he is able to explain the situation to the police, that it was a joke, and the officer and the young women help get him released. In the end Geoffrey proves that he is indeed worthy of Marion's affections.

== Cast ==
- Monte Blue as Geoffrey West
- Dorothy Devore as Marion Larnard
- Helen Dunbar as Aunt Hattie
- John Roche as Captain Fraser-Freer
- Stanley Taylor as Norman Fraser-Freer
- Carl Stockdale as Enright
- Heinie Conklin as Mose (credited as Charles Conklin)

== Box Office ==
According to Warner Bros records, the film earned $151,000 in domestic and $29,000 in foreign markets.

== Preservation ==
With no prints of The Man Upstairs located in any film archives, it is a lost film.
