= The Tenth Woman =

1924 film by James Flood

- Directed by: James Flood
- Written by: Julian Josephson (scenario)
- Based on: The Tenth Woman by Harriet T. Comstock
- Starring: Beverly Bayne
- Cinematography: John J. Mescall
- Production company: Warner Bros.
- Distributed by: Warner Bros.
- Release date: August 25, 1924
- Running time: 7 reels
- Country: USA
- Language: Silent (English intertitles)

The Tenth Woman is a lost 1924 American silent drama film directed by James Flood and starring Beverly Bayne. It is based on a novel by Harriet T. Comstock. The feature was produced and distributed by Warner Bros.

== Cast ==
- Beverly Bayne - Willa Brookes
- John Roche - Barry Compton
- June Marlowe - Rose Ann Brainherd
- Raymond McKee - Billy Brainherd
- Charles A. Post - Donaldson (*as Charles 'Buddy' Post)
- Gilbert Holmes - Shorty
- Alec B. Francis - Mr. Brainherd
- Edith Yorke - Mrs. Brainherd

== Preservation ==
With no holdings located in archives, The Tenth Woman is considered a lost film.
