= Pat Hartigan (actor) =

American actor and director (1881–1951)

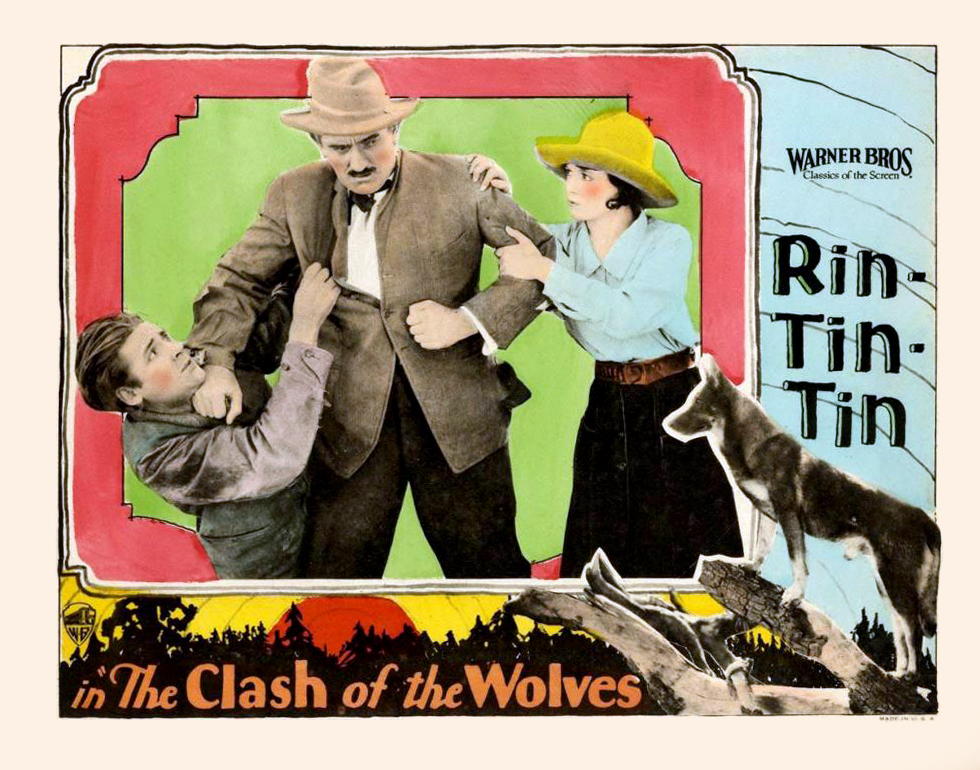
- Lobby card with Charles Farrell, Pat Hartigan, and June Marlowe in The Clash of the Wolves (1925)
- Born: December 21, 1881; New York City, New York, U.S.
- Died: May 8, 1951 (aged 69); Los Angeles, California, U.S.
- Occupation: Actor
- Years active: 1909-1940

Pat Hartigan (December 21, 1881 – May 8, 1951) was an American actor and director. He appeared in 72 films between 1909 and 1940. He also directed 14 films between 1911 and 1919.

== Selected filmography ==
- The Life of Moses (1909) - Moses
- The Planter (1917) - Andy Meagher
- The Prussian Cur (1918) - Adm. von Tirpitz
- Why America Will Win (1918)
- Swat the Spy (1918) - Karl Schmidt
- A Fallen Idol (1919) - Brainard's Chief Mate
- The Adventurer (1920) - Captain of the Guards
- The Wonder Man (1920) - Monroe
- Out of the Snows (1920) - John Blakeman
- Conceit (1921) - Sam Boles
- My Old Kentucky Home (1922) - Detective Monahan
- Channing of the Northwest (1922) - Sport McCool
- Down to the Sea in Ships (1922) - Jake Finner
- Fury (1923) - Morgan
- Dark Secrets (1923) - Biskra
- Where the North Begins (1923) - Shad Galloway
- The Darling of New York (1923) - Big Mike
- The Dramatic Life of Abraham Lincoln (1924) - Jack Armstrong
- Big Timber (1924)
- The King of Wild Horses (1924) - Wade Galvin
- Western Luck (1924) - James Evart
- Welcome Stranger (1924) - Detective
- Find Your Man (1924) - Martin Dains
- Code of the West (1925) - Cal Bloom
- The Thundering Herd (1925) - Catlett
- Paint and Powder (1925) - Steve McCardle
- Below the Line (1925) - Jamber Niles
- Bobbed Hair (1925) - Swede
- The Clash of the Wolves (1925) - Wm. 'Borax' Horton
- The Fighting Edge (1926) - Taggert
- Ranson's Folly (1926) - Sgt. Clancy
- Johnny Get Your Hair Cut (1927) - Jiggs Bradley
- Heaven on Earth (1927) - Anton
- The Enchanted Island (1927) - Red Blake
- Too Many Crooks (1927) - 'Big Dan' Boyd
- A Bowery Cinderella (1927) - Pat Denahy
- A Race for Life (1928) - Tramp
- The Devil's Skipper (1928) - Captain McKenna
- Tenderloin (1928) - 'The Mug'
- State Street Sadie (1928) - Policeman 'Bull' Hawkins
- The Midnight Taxi (1928) - Detective Blake
- Me, Gangster (1928) - Gangster (uncredited)
- In Old Arizona (1928) - Cowpuncher (uncredited)
- From Headquarters (1929) - Spike Connelly
- The Far Call (1929) - Lars Johannson
- The Man Hunter (1930) - Crosby
- Other Men's Women (1931) - Yardmaster (uncredited)
- El código penal (1931) - (uncredited)
- Corsair (1931)
- Handle with Care (1932) - Callahan
- The Power and the Glory (1933) - Board of Directors (uncredited)
- Shadows of Sing Sing (1933)
- Coming Out Party (1934) - Cop (uncredited)
- Judge Priest (1934) - Townsman in Saloon (uncredited)
- The Whole Town's Talking (1935) - Policeman (uncredited)
- Song and Dance Man (1936) - Bailiff (uncredited)
- Human Cargo (1936) - Detective (uncredited)
- High Tension (1936) - Speedboat Pilot (uncredited)
- The Plough and the Stars (1936) - Minor Role (uncredited)
- That Girl from Paris (1936) - Second Immigration Officer (uncredited)
- There Goes My Girl (1937) - Minor Role (uncredited)
- East Side of Heaven (1939) - Doorman (uncredited)
- Union Pacific (1939) - Irishman (uncredited)
- Little Old New York (1940) - Regan's Henchman (uncredited)
