= A Lost Lady (1924 film) =

1924 film by Harry Beaumont

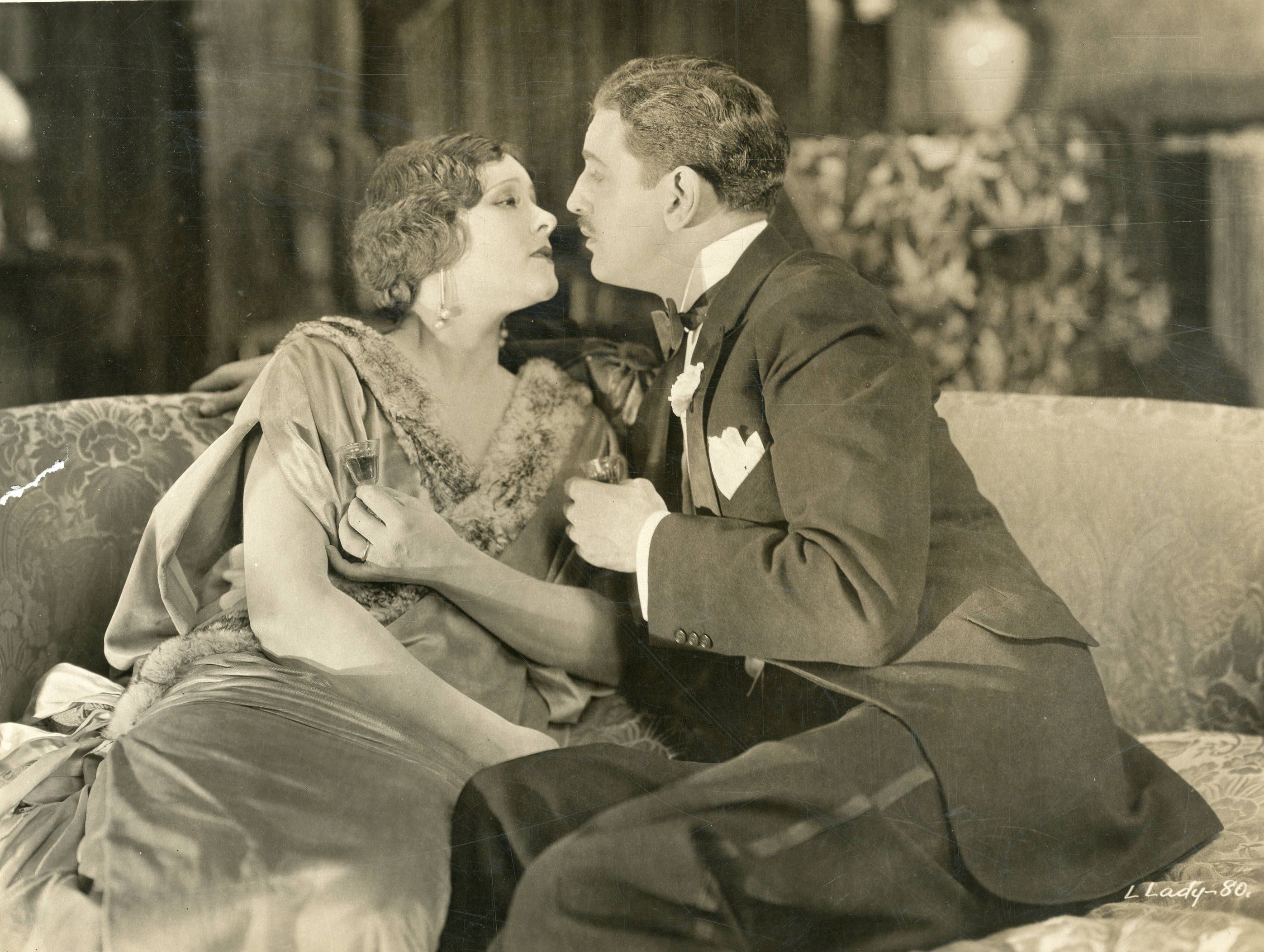
- Still
- Directed by: Harry Beaumont
- Screenplay by: Dorothy Farnum
- Based on: A Lost Lady by Willa Cather
- Starring: Irene Rich; Matt Moore; June Marlowe; John Roche; Victor Potel; George Fawcett
- Cinematography: David Abel
- Production company: Warner Bros.
- Distributed by: Warner Bros.
- Release date: December 18, 1924
- Running time: 70 minutes
- Country: United States
- Language: Silent (English intertitles)

A Lost Lady is a lost 1924 American silent drama film directed by Harry Beaumont and written by Dorothy Farnum. It is based on the 1923 novel A Lost Lady by Willa Cather. The film stars Irene Rich, Matt Moore, June Marlowe, John Roche, Victor Potel, and George Fawcett. The film was released by Warner Bros. on December 18, 1924.

== Plot ==
As described in a review in a film magazine, married to Captain Forrester, an elderly railroad builder of great wealth, Marian Forrester feels the call of youth and love and begins to get away. Her chance comes when Frank Ellinger becomes interested in her and finally persuades her to elope. Just as they start out, she learns that her husband has beggared himself by giving away his fortune to save a workingman's bank, so she returns. Later, when it seems that she can stand no more, she finds out that Frank, who she believed would return to her, is to marry someone else. She tries to go to him but misses the train, so she goes to Neil Herbert, who has always admired her. She calls Frank, who turns her down but suggests that they can keep seeing each other. Enraged, she starts to rebuke him, but Neil cuts the wire to end the call. Neil takes her back to her husband, who then dies. Utterly dejected, she gives way to despair, taking to drink and becoming slovenly in appearance. Neil sticks to her and tries to help her to fight back, until he finds her affectionate with a low country fellow. Disgusted, he tells her that lilies that decay are worse than weeds, and leaves her. Years later, when Neil's views have softened with age, he meets a friend who tells him that he saw Marian in South America. She was apparently happy and prosperous, the wife of a wealthy old man.

== Cast ==
- Irene Rich as Marian Forrester
- Matt Moore as Neil Herbert
- June Marlowe as Constance Ogden
- John Roche as Frank Ellinger
- Victor Potel as Ivy Peters
- George Fawcett as Capt. Forrester
- Eva Gordon as Bohemian Mary
- Nanette Vallon as Gypsy Dancer
- Estelle Bradley as Gypsy Dancer

== Preservation status ==
With no prints of A Lost Lady located in any film archives, it is a lost film.
