= Under-Cover Man =

1932 film

- Directed by: James Flood
- Written by: Thomson Burtis; Francis Edward Faragoh; Garrett Fort
- Based on: novel by John Wilstach
- Starring: George Raft; Nancy Carroll; Lew Cody
- Cinematography: Victor Milner
- Production company: Paramount Pictures
- Distributed by: Paramount Pictures
- Release date: December 2, 1932
- Running time: 74 minutes
- Country: United States
- Language: English

Under Cover Man is a 1932 American pre-Code crime film directed by James Flood and starring George Raft, Nancy Carroll and Lew Cody. It was produced and distributed by Paramount Pictures.

== Plot ==
Criminal Nick Darrow goes undercover to get the gangsters who killed his father. He teams up with Lora, the sister of Jimmy, a man who was killed by the same people.

== Cast ==
- George Raft as Nick Darrow
- Nancy Carroll as Lora Madigan
- Lew Cody as Kenneth Mason
- Roscoe Karns as Dannie
- Noel Francis as Connie
- Gregory Ratoff as Martoff
- David Landau as Conklin
- Paul Porcasi as Sam Dorse
- Leyland Hodgson as Gillespie
- William Janney as Jimmy Madigan
- George Davis as Bernie
- Robert Homans as Flanagan

== Production ==
The film was based on a novel by journalist John Wilstach which was published in 1931. The New York Times says "the book keeps pace with this morning's edition fairly well. Mr Wilstach merely blocks his crooks out in the rough. He lets action speak louder than style. There is a rather tarnished love interest. But the crookery is exciting."

Filming took place in October 1932. It was called "Raft's first important personal assignment."

It was the first time Raft played an undercover man. He would go on to play several more, even insisting scripts be changed so his character was an undercover man.

== Reception ==
The Los Angeles Times called it "exciting and those who like this kind of entertainment will make no mistake to see it."
