= The Swellhead =

1930 film

- Directed by: James Flood
- Written by: Richard Cahoon; Adele Buffington; James Gleason
- Starring: James Gleason; Johnnie Walker; Marion Shilling
- Cinematography: Arthur Reeves; Jackson Rose
- Edited by: Richard Cahoon
- Production company: Tiffany Pictures
- Distributed by: Tiffany Pictures
- Release date: March 20, 1930
- Running time: 70 minutes
- Country: United States
- Language: English

The Swellhead is a 1930 American pre-Code sports film directed by James Flood and starring James Gleason, Johnnie Walker, and Marion Shilling. It is also known by the alternative title of Counted Out.

== Cast ==
- James Gleason as Johnny Trump
- Johnnie Walker as Bill 'Cyclone' Hickey
- Marion Shilling as Mamie Judd
- Natalie Kingston as Barbara Larkin
- Paul Hurst as Mugsy
- Freeman Wood as Clive Warren
- Lillian Elliott as Mrs. Callahan

== Preservation status ==
A copy is preserved in the Library of Congress collection.
