= The Scarlet Kiss =

1920 film

- Directed by: Fred Goodwins
- Written by: Fred Goodwins
- Based on: An eponymous novel by Gertie de S. Wentworth-James
- Starring: Maud Cressall; Philip Hewland; Marjorie Hume
- Production company: Martin's Photoplays
- Distributed by: Faulkner
- Release date: January 1920
- Country: United Kingdom
- Languages: Silent; English intertitles

The Scarlet Kiss is a 1920 British silent sports film directed by Fred Goodwins and starring Maud Cressall, Philip Hewland and Marjorie Hume.

It is an adaptation of a 1909 novel by romance author Gertie de S. Wentworth-James, which was, upon its release, deemed too controversial for libraries in London to carry.

== Cast ==
- Maud Cressall
- Philip Hewland
- Marjorie Hume
- Cyril Raymond

== Status ==
As of 2026, The Scarlet Kiss is not featured in the archive of the British Film Institute. The institute estimates that up to 90 per cent of silent films produced in Britain before 1930 are lost.

== Bibliography ==
- Mitchell, Glenn. The Chaplin Encyclopedia. B.T. Batsford, 1997.
