= The False Alarm =

1926 film

- Directed by: Frank O'Connor
- Written by: Leah Baird
- Starring: Ralph Lewis; Dorothy Revier; John Harron
- Cinematography: Faxon M. Dean
- Production company: Columbia Pictures
- Distributed by: Columbia Pictures
- Release date: September 20, 1926
- Running time: 57 minutes
- Country: United States
- Language: Silent (English intertitles)

The False Alarm is a 1926 American silent drama film directed by Frank O'Connor and starring Ralph Lewis, Dorothy Revier, and John Harron.

== Plot ==
As described in a film magazine review, Fighting John Casey, a historic fire chief, has two sons of contrasting natures. The father's ambition is for Jim to follow in his footsteps, but the boy has an inborn fear of flames. On his the first fire he attends, he runs out, leaving his father in the burning building. Jim is dropped from the fire department and then ordered from the home. While working in a steel mill, he overcomes his fear of flames and then returns home to ask for another chance to make good. Meanwhile, his elder no account brother Tim has betrayed a young woman, Bessie Flannigan. He attacks her when she threatens to expose him and in the scuffle, a lamp is overturned. This fire is the first chance Jim has to prove that he has overcome his fear of fire, and he saves his brother and the young woman. The pair are married and Jim is gloriously reinstated in the fire department. Jim finds himself ready to marry Mary, a young woman who has been living with his parents.

== Cast ==
- Ralph Lewis as Fighting John Casey
- Dorothy Revier as Mary Doyle
- John Harron as Joe Casey
- George O'Hara as Tim Casey
- Priscilla Bonner as Bessie Flannigan
- Mary Carr as Mrs. Casey
- Lillian Leighton as Mrs. Flannigan
- Maurice Costello
- Billy Franey
- Arthur Hoyt

== Censorship ==
The False Alarm was rejected in its entirety by the Kansas Board of Review.

== Preservation ==
With no prints of The False Alarm located in any film archives, it is considered a lost film. The film was cited by National Film Preservation Board on the Lost U.S. Silent Feature Films list in February 2021.

== Bibliography ==
- Munden, Kenneth White. The American Film Institute Catalog of Motion Pictures Produced in the United States, Part 1. University of California Press, 1997.
