= Free Lips =

1928 film by Wallace MacDonald

- Directed by: Wallace MacDonald
- Written by: Jack Kelly; Raymond Wells
- Produced by: James Ormont
- Starring: June Marlowe
- Cinematography: Jack Fuqua; Cliff Thomas
- Edited by: Gene Milford
- Distributed by: First Division Pictures
- Release date: May 10, 1928
- Country: USA
- Language: Silent..English intertitles

Free Lips is a 1928 American silent mystery drama film directed by actor Wallace MacDonald. It stars June Marlowe.

A copy is preserved in the Library of Congress collection.

== Cast ==
- June Marlowe - Ann Baldridge
- Frank Hagney - Bill Dugan
- Jane Novak - Flossie Moore
- Ernest Shields - The Fox
- Olin Francis - Det. Kelly
- Edna Hearn - Mazie
