= Cheating Blondes =

1933 film

- Directed by: Joseph Levering
- Written by: Islin Auster; Lewis R. Foster
- Based on: House of Chance by Gertie de S. Wentworth-James
- Produced by: Larry Darmour
- Starring: Thelma Todd; Ralf Harolde; Inez Courtney
- Cinematography: James S. Brown Jr.
- Edited by: Dwight Caldwell
- Music by: Lee Zahler
- Production company: Larry Darmour Productions
- Distributed by: Majestic Pictures; Equitable Pictures
- Release date: May 1, 1933
- Running time: 66 minutes
- Country: United States
- Language: English

Cheating Blondes is a 1933 American pre-Code mystery film directed by Joseph Levering and starring Thelma Todd, Ralf Harolde and Inez Courtney.

== Plot ==
The film is an adaptation of Gertie de S. Wentworth-James' 1913 novel, House of Chance, and was released in the United Kingdom under that name. It follows twin sisters (both played by Todd), one of whom masquerades as the other after being wrongfully suspected of murder.

== Re-release and status ==
In 1952, the film was re-released under the name Girls in Trouble. As of the early 21st century, the movie is extant.

== Cast ==
- Thelma Todd as Anne Merrick / Elaine Manners
- Ralf Harolde as Lawson Rolt
- Inez Courtney as Polly
- Milton Wallis as Mike Goldfish
- Mae Busch as Mrs. Jennie Carter
- Earl McCarthy as Gilbert Frayle
- William Humphrey as Jim - City Editor
- Dorothy Gulliver as Lita
- Brooks Benedict as Jim Carter
- Eddie Fetherston as Mitch
- Ben Savage as Ferdie
- Edna Murphy as Girl

== Bibliography ==
- Stephen Handzo. Hollywood and the Female Body: A History of Idolization and Objectification. McFarland, 2020.
