= Herman C. Raymaker =

American film director and actor

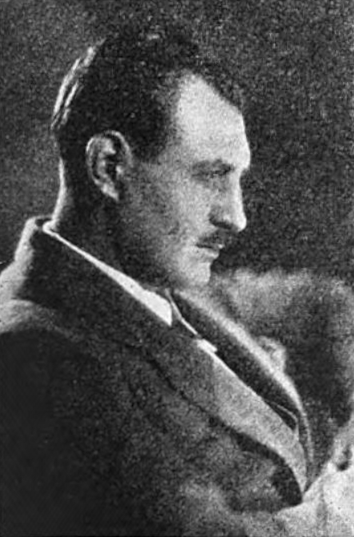

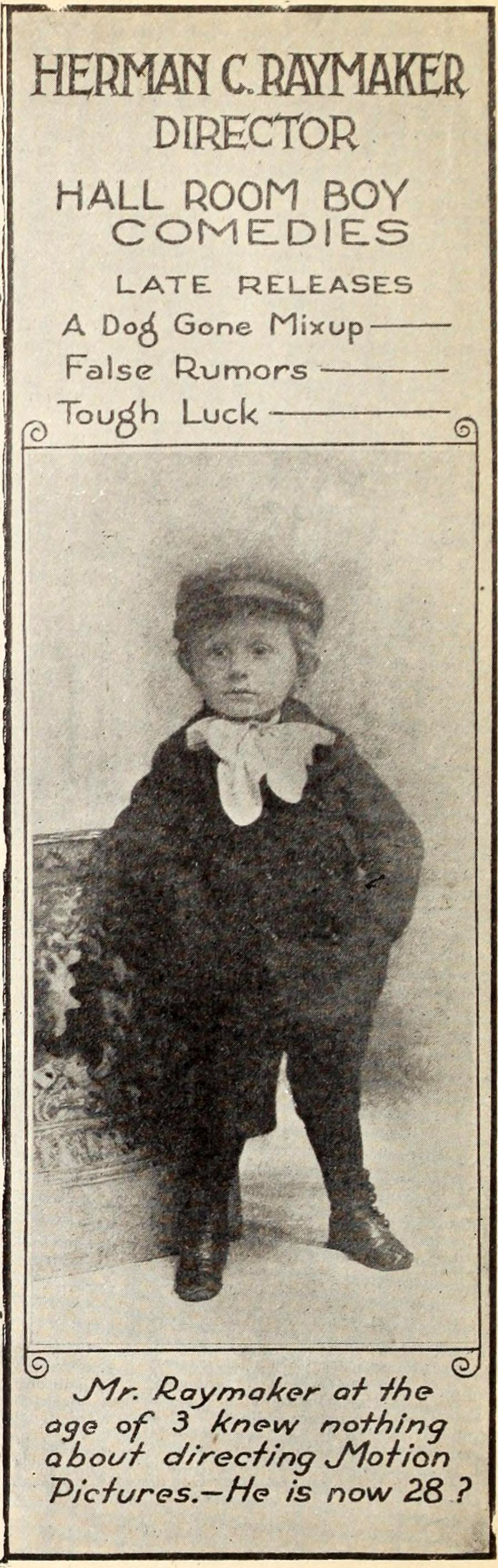
Advertisement (1921)

Herman C. Raymaker (January 22, 1893 – March 6, 1944) was an American film director and actor. He directed 51 films between 1917 and 1934. His last two films as director were Trailing the Killer (1932) and Adventure Girl (1934).

He was born in Oakland, California, US and died in Oceanside, Long Island, New York. He was buried at San Gabriel Cemetery.

== Partial filmography ==
- His Bitter Pill (1916)*short
- Racing Luck (1924)
- Below the Line (1925)
- The Love Hour (1925)
- Tracked in the Snow Country (1925)
- His Jazz Bride (1926)
- The Night Cry (1926)
- Flying Luck (1927)
- The Gay Old Bird (1927)
- Under the Tonto Rim (1928)
