= The Love Hour =

1925 film directed by Herman C. Raymaker

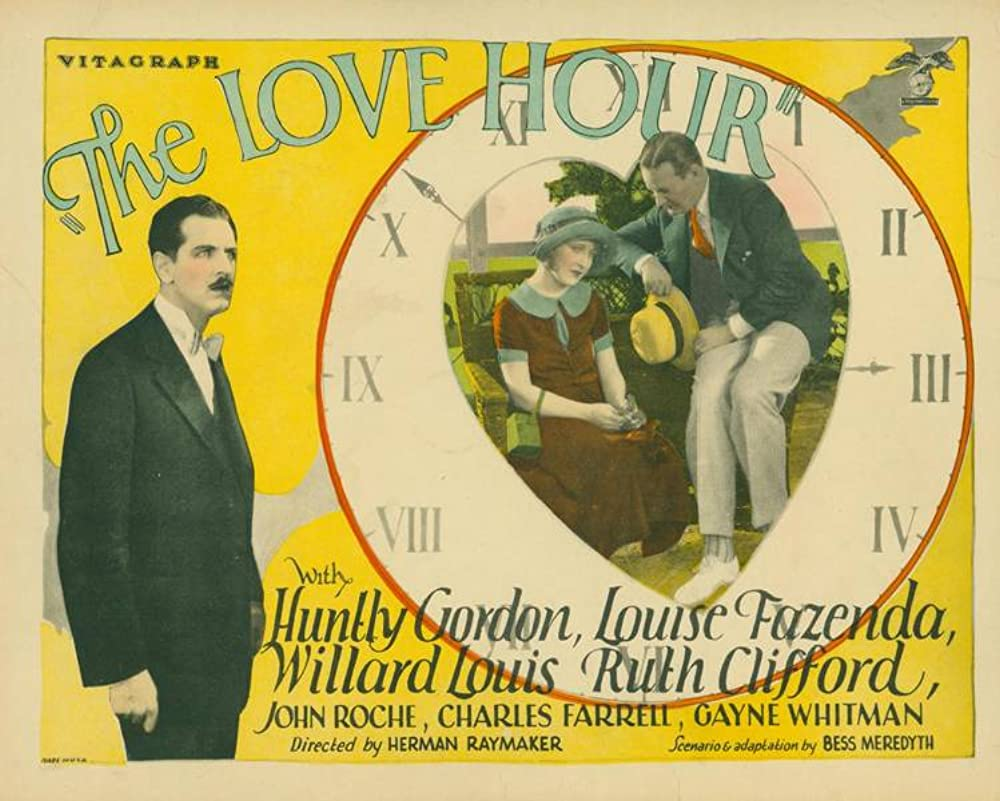
- Directed by: Herman C. Raymaker
- Written by: Bess Meredyth
- Starring: Huntley Gordon; Louise Fazenda; Willard Louis
- Cinematography: Edwin B. DuPar
- Production company: Vitagraph Pictures
- Distributed by: Warner Bros.
- Release date: August 30, 1925
- Running time: 70 minutes
- Country: United States
- Languages: Silent; English intertitles

The Love Hour is a 1925 American silent drama film directed by Herman C. Raymaker and starring Huntley Gordon, Louise Fazenda and Willard Louis.

== Cast ==
- Huntley Gordon as Rex Westmore
- Louise Fazenda as Jenny Tibbs
- Willard Louis as Gus Yerger
- Ruth Clifford as Betty Brown
- John Roche as Ward Ralston
- Charles Farrell as Kid Lewis
- Gayne Whitman as Attorney

== Preservation ==
With no holdings located in archives, The Love Hour is considered a lost film.

== Bibliography ==
- Monaco, James. The Encyclopedia of Film. Perigee Books, 1991.
