= The Night Cry =

1926 film directed by Herman C. Raymaker

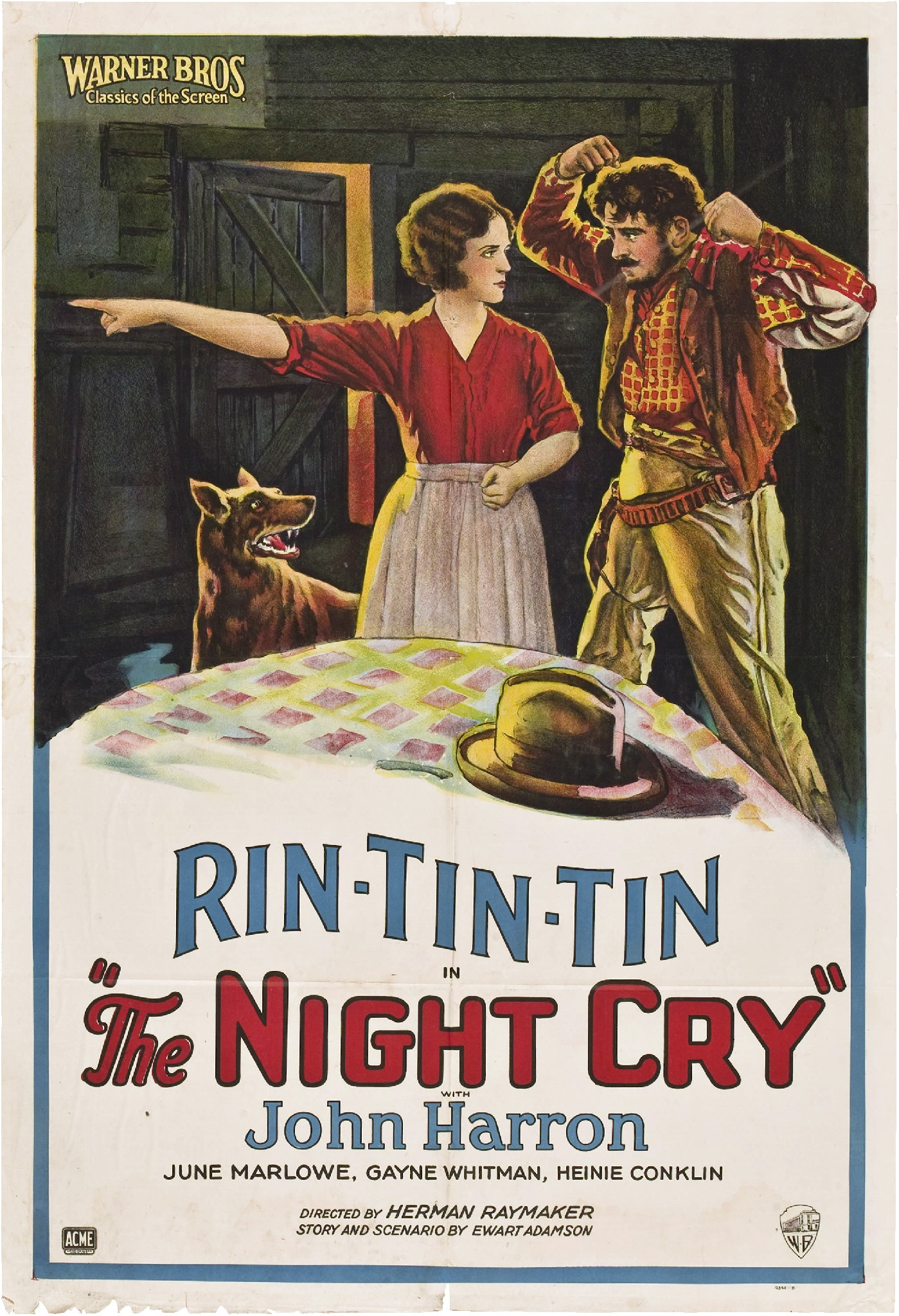
- Theatrical release poster
- Directed by: Herman C. Raymaker
- Written by: Ewart Adamson (adaptation)
- Story by: Paul Klein; Edward J. Meagher
- Starring: Rin Tin Tin; June Marlowe; John Harron
- Cinematography: Edwin B. DuPar; Walter Robinson
- Edited by: Clarence Kolster
- Production company: Warner Bros.
- Distributed by: Warner Bros.
- Release date: February 27, 1926
- Running time: 70 minutes
- Country: United States
- Language: Silent (English intertitles)
- Budget: $106,000
- Box office: $284,000

The Night Cry is a 1926 American silent family drama film directed by Herman C. Raymaker and starring Rin Tin Tin. It was produced and distributed by Warner Bros.

== Plot ==
As described in a film magazine review, John Martin's dog, "Rinty," is declared to be a lamb killer and collar picked up on the Hernandez ranch. By law of range, "Rinty" is ordered to be killed. Instead, Martin hides him. Later a huge condor is discovered making an onslaught on the herd. Ranchmen realize that "Rinty" is innocent. All rush to the Martin home knowing Miguel Hernandez has gone gunning for the dog. "Rinty," however, fights off the villain and then saves the Martin baby from the condor which has flown away to mountain retreat with the tot.

== Cast ==
- Rin Tin Tin as himself
- John Harron as John Martin
- June Marlowe as Mrs. John Martin
- Gayne Whitman as Miguel Hernandez
- Heinie Conklin as Tony
- Don Alvarado as Pedro
- Mary Louis Miller as The Martin baby

== Box office ==
According to Warner Bros records the film earned $243,000 domestically and $41,000 in foreign markets, against a budget of $106,000.

== Home media ==
This is an extant Rin Tin Tin feature available on DVD.
