= Racing Luck (1924 film) =

1924 film directed by Herman C. Raymaker

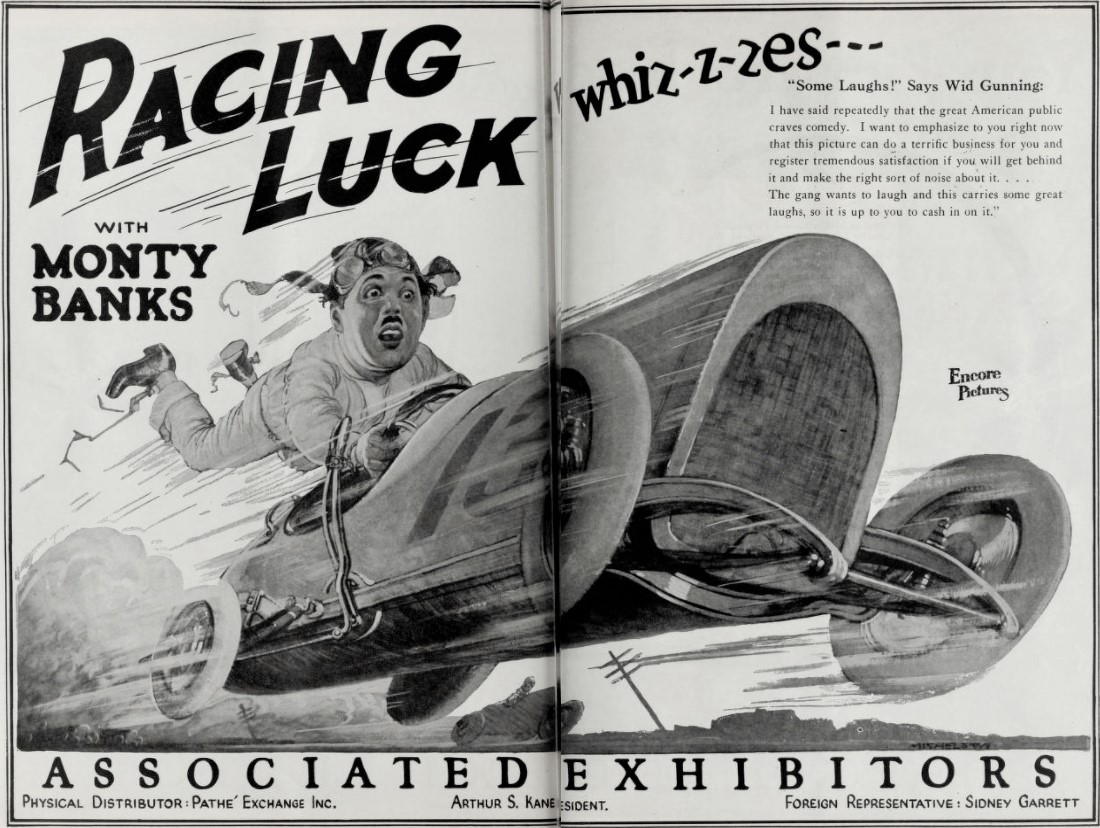
- Advertisement
- Directed by: Herman C. Raymaker
- Written by: Jean C. Havez; Lex Neal
- Produced by: Samuel Bischoff
- Starring: Monty Banks; Helen Ferguson; Lionel Belmore
- Cinematography: Ray June
- Production company: Monty Banks Productions
- Distributed by: Associated Exhibitors
- Release date: May 11, 1924
- Running time: 60 minutes
- Country: United States
- Language: Silent (English intertitles)

Racing Luck is a 1924 American silent comedy film directed by Herman C. Raymaker and starring Monty Banks, Helen Ferguson, and Lionel Belmore.

== Plot ==
As described in a film magazine review, Mario, a young Italian immigrant, comes to New York City and falls in love with a Rosina, a young woman. They become dancing partners in a cafe. Mario raises a drink to toast the Statue of Liberty but a policeman stops him, the Volstead Act having established the prohibition of alcoholic drinks. Gang leader Tony Mora is jealous of him and gives Mario some rough moments, but he whips several of Tony's crowd and knocks out the leader. Having learned to drive a Ford, he is induced to enter a road race. Conspirators lock his racing car in high gear and it has no brakes. As the machine cuts circles, hops out into fields, and performs all sorts of incredible antics, the fun grows fast and furious as onlookers alternately rock with laughter and gasp in sympathy with the amateur driver in his hairbreadth escapes from sudden death. While Mario finds himself in serious difficulties, he wins the affections of Rosina and all ends well.

== Cast ==
- Monty Banks as Mario, The Boy
- Helen Ferguson as Rosina, The Girl
- Martha Franklin as Mrs. Bianchi, The Mother
- D.J. Mitsoras as Bianchi, The Father
- Lionel Belmore as The Uncle
- Francis McDonald as Tony Mora
- William Blaisdell as Cafe Proprietor
- Al Martin as Member of Tony's gang
- Al Thompson as Member of Tony's gang
- Edward Carlie as Member of Tony's gang
- Scaduto as Member of Tony's gang

== Preservation ==
Prints of Racing Luck are held in the collections of Cinémathèque royale de Belgique in Brussels and Gosfilmofond in Moscow.

== Bibliography ==
- Munden, Kenneth White. The American Film Institute Catalog of Motion Pictures Produced in the United States, Part 1. University of California Press, 1997.
