= Tracked in the Snow Country =

1925 film directed by Herman C. Raymaker

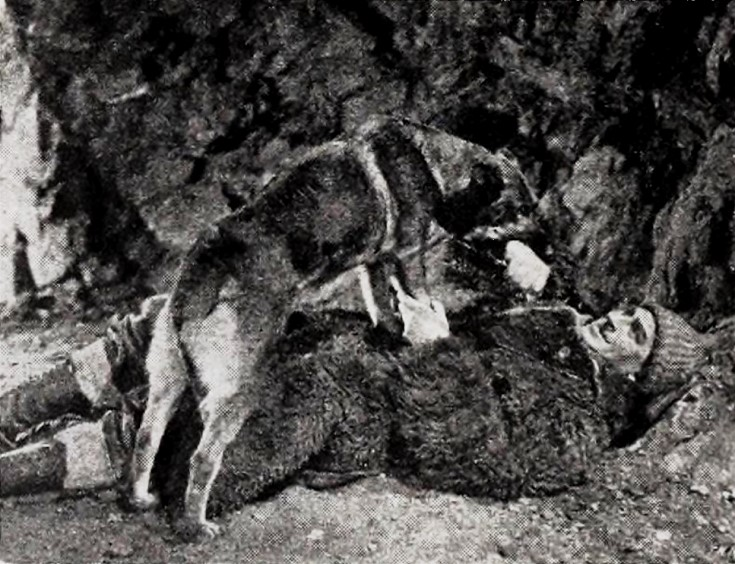
- Film still
- Directed by: Herman C. Raymaker
- Screenplay by: Edward J. Meagher; Herman C. Raymaker
- Story by: Edward J. Meagher; Herman C. Raymaker
- Starring: Rin Tin Tin; June Marlowe; David Butler; Mitchell Lewis; Charles Sellon; Princess Lea
- Cinematography: Ray June
- Production company: Warner Bros.
- Distributed by: Warner Bros.
- Release date: July 13, 1925
- Running time: 55 minutes
- Country: United States
- Language: Silent (English intertitles)
- Budget: $105,000
- Box office: $322,000

Tracked in the Snow Country is a 1925 American silent drama film directed by Herman C. Raymaker, written by Edward J. Meagher and Herman C. Raymaker, and starring canine star Rin Tin Tin, as well as June Marlowe, David Butler, Mitchell Lewis, Charles Sellon, and Princess Lea. It was released by Warner Bros. on July 13, 1925.

== Plot ==
As described in a film magazine reviews, the dog, Rin-Tin-Tin, is accused of having killed his master. Because the fallacy of the accusation hurts him, he escapes to the woods and joins a pack of wolves, with which he lives for a time. Later he finds the real murderer, captures him, and is declared innocent. He returns to live with his folks at home, where he fathers a litter of pups.

== Cast ==
- Rin Tin Tin as Rin Tin Tin
- June Marlowe as Joan Hardy
- David Butler as Terry Moulton
- Mitchell Lewis as Jules Renault
- Charles Sellon as Silent Hardy
- Princess Lea as Wah-Wah

== Box office ==
According to Warner Bros. records, the film earned $278,000 domestically and $44,000 in foreign markets.

== Preservation ==
The film exists in a print held by Cinemateket-Svenska Filminstitutet, Stockholm.
