= The Fighting Edge =

1926 film

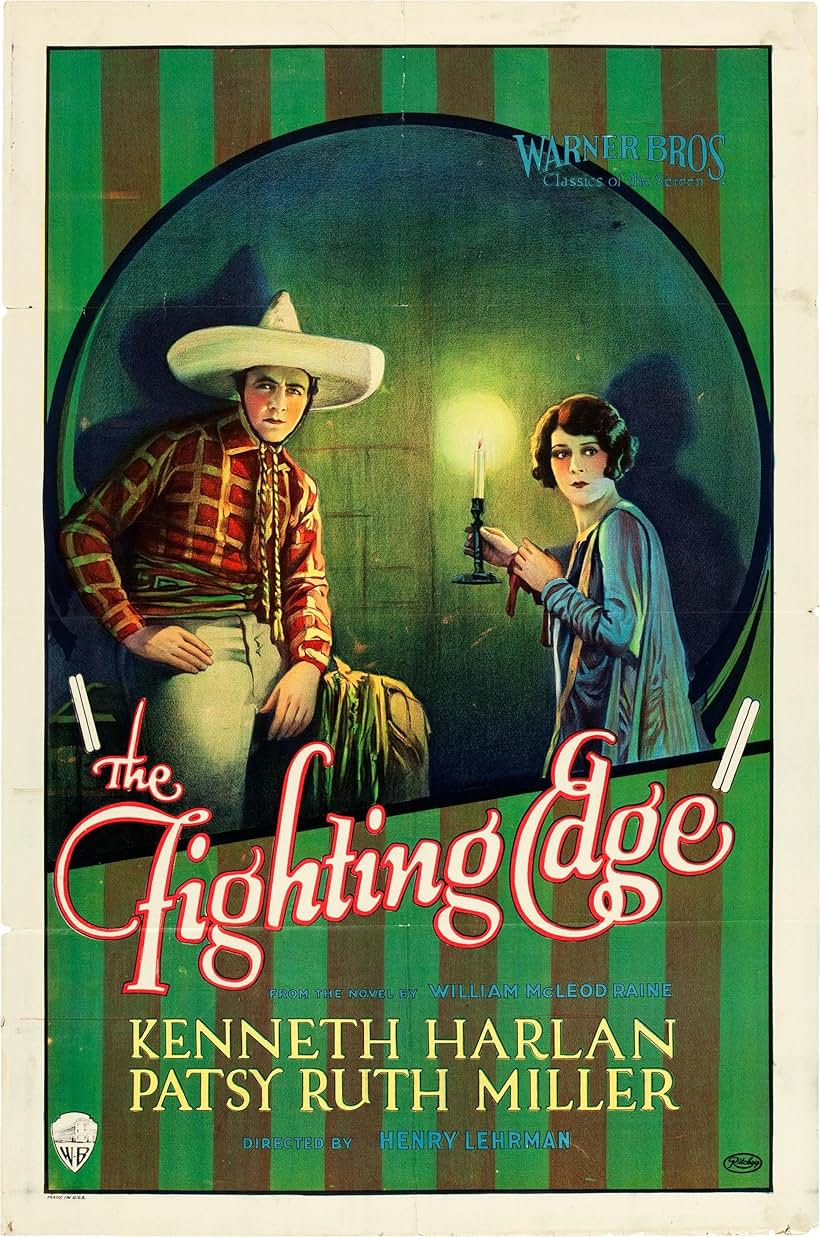
- Theatrical release poster
- Directed by: Henry Lehrman
- Screenplay by: Edward T. Lowe Jr. Jack Wagner
- Based on: The Fighting Edge by William MacLeod Raine
- Starring: Kenneth Harlan; Patsy Ruth Miller; David Kirby; Heinie Conklin; Pat Hartigan; Lew Harvey
- Cinematography: Allen Q. Thompson
- Edited by: Clarence Kolster
- Production company: Warner Bros.
- Distributed by: Warner Bros.
- Release date: January 8, 1926
- Running time: 70 minutes
- Country: United States
- Language: Silent (English intertitles)

The Fighting Edge is a 1926 American silent action film directed by Henry Lehrman and written by Edward T. Lowe Jr. and Jack Wagner. It is based on the 1922 novel The Fighting Edge by William MacLeod Raine. The film stars Kenneth Harlan, Patsy Ruth Miller, David Kirby, Heinie Conklin, Pat Hartigan, and Lew Harvey. The film was released by Warner Bros. on January 8, 1926.

== Plot ==
As described in a film magazine review, Joyce, a government agent, is imprisoned by a gang of smugglers in their ranch house along the Mexican boarder. Juan de Dios O'Rourke, another government agent posing as being half-Spanish and living in Mexico, is commissioned to rescue Joyce. He meets Phoebe, Joyce's daughter, who purposefully drives an automobile down a cliff. She feigns unconsciousness following the accident and is carried into the house by the smugglers. Eventually Juan and Phoebe, with the aid of the cook, escape with Joyce to a deserted house. The smugglers follow, but United States troops arrive to save the day. Juan and Phoebe wed.

== Cast ==
- Kenneth Harlan as Juan de Dios O'Rourke
- Patsy Ruth Miller as Phoebe Joyce
- David Kirby as Gilette
- Heinie Conklin as Chuck
- Pat Hartigan as Taggert
- Lew Harvey as Bailey
- Eugene Pallette as Simpson
- Pat Harmon as Hadley
- William A. Carroll as Mr. Joyce
