= Harriet Theresa Comstock =

American novelist

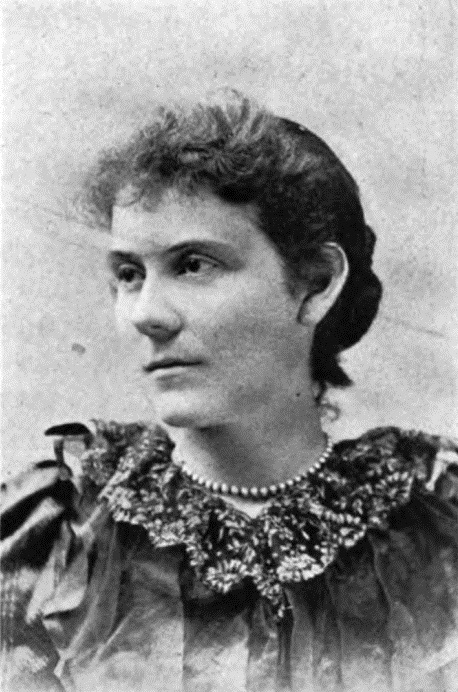
- Harriet Theresa Comstock
- Born: Harriet Theresa Smith; August 12, 1860; Nichols, New York, United States
- Died: September 6, 1949 (aged 89); New York, United States
- Occupation: Writer (novelist)

Harriet Theresa Comstock (née Smith; August 12, 1860 – September 6, 1949), commonly published as Harriet T. Comstock, was an American novelist and children's author. Beginning her career with stories and books for children, she later became a prolific writer of popular fiction for adults. Her novels included Janet of the Dunes (1908), Joyce of the North Woods (1911), A Son of the Hills (1913), and The Place Beyond the Winds (1916). Several of her works were adapted for films, and her depictions of rural and wilderness settings led to her being described as the "Woman Zane Grey."

== Early life and education ==
Comstock was born Harriet Theresa Smith on August 12, 1860 to Samuel Alpheus and Jean (Downey) Smith in Nichols, New York. She was the couple's twelfth child. Comstock was educated in Plainfield, New Jersey. As a young woman, she wrote stories for the school newspaper.

== Career ==
Comstock began her career writing children's stories; she followed these with books for older children. In the early 1900s, the first of her many novels for adults was published. One of Comstock's titles, Joyce of the North Woods (1911), sold 10,000 copies when first released and reprints sold an additional 60,000. This novel, together with Janet of the Dunes (1908) and A Son of the Hills (1913), sold 250,000 copies in three years. Comstock traveled in the Northwest and Canada to the locales of her novels before she began writing. She became known as the "Woman Zane Grey" for her depictions of these locations in her books.

=== Critical reception ===
A review of Penelope's Web (1928) noted that Comstock wrote of life problems in each of her books but in a way that was optimistic. Another contemporary critic described Comstock as displaying "literary idealism" because her books stressed the importance of egalitarianism and good character. The Place Beyond the Winds (1914), for example, concerns the destructive nature of eugenics and "the ethics of silence on certain matters affecting marriage." Other critics pointed to the sentimental nature of Comstock's novels as a weakness.

=== Film credits and adaptations ===
Comstock is credited as the writer on three silent films: Janet of the Dunes (1913), Joyce of the North Woods (1913), and Molly, the Drummer Boy (1914). Four later films were based on Comstock's novels: The Place Beyond the Winds (1916), A Son of the Hills (1917), Silent Years (1921) (based on Mam'selle Jo (1918)), and The Tenth Woman (1924).

== Personal life ==
On September 24, 1885, Comstock married Philip Comstock of Brooklyn, New York. The couple had two sons, Philip Jr. and Albert, and lived in the Flatbush neighborhood of Brooklyn. In 1918, she moved to Manhattan. Disliking typewriters, Comstock wrote her books by hand. When her sight diminished, she dictated her novels.

Comstock was a member of the Pen and Brush Club in New York City. She was a strong supporter of suffrage for women and was president of the Woman Suffrage Party club in the 18th Assembly District of Brooklyn. Comstock died on September 6, 1949, in New York.

== Selected works ==
- Andersen's Fairy Tales: Retold in Words of One Syllable. New York: A. L. Burt Company, 1900.
- Bible Stories. New York: A. L. Burt, c. 1900.
- Molly, the Drummer Boy: A Story of the Revolution. Philadelphia: Henry Altemus Company, c. 1900.
- Cedric the Saxon. New York: Thomas Whittaker, c. 1901.
- A Boy of a Thousand Years Ago. Boston: Lothrop Publishing Company, 1902.
- A Little Dusky Hero. New York: T. Y. Crowell & Co., c. 1902.
- Tower or Throne: A Romance of the Girlhood of Elizabeth. Boston: Little, Brown, and Company, 1902.
- Then Marched the Brave. Philadelphia: Henry Altemus Company, c. 1904.
- When the British Came. Philadelphia: Henry Altemus Company, c. 1904.
- An Unintentional Patriot. Philadelphia: Henry Altemus Company, 1906.
- Meg and the Others. New York: T. Y. Crowell & Co., 1906.
- The Queen's Hostage. Boston: Little, Brown, and Company, 1906.
- Janet of the Dunes. Boston: Little, Brown, and Company, 1908.
- Joyce of the North Woods. Garden City, New York, 1911.
- Princess Rags and Tatters. Garden City, New York: Doubleday, Page & Company, 1912.
- Camp Brave Pine: A Camp Fire Girl Story. New York: Thomas Y. Crowell Company, 1913.
- A Son of the Hills. Garden City, New York: Doubleday, Page & Company, 1913.
- The Place Beyond the Winds. Garden City, New York: Doubleday, Page & Company, 1914.
- The Vindication. Garden City, New York: Doubleday, Page & Company, 1916.
- The Man Thou Gavest. Garden City, New York: Doubleday, Page & Company, 1917.
- Mam'selle Jo. Garden City, New York: Doubleday, Page & Company, 1918.
- Unbroken Lines. Garden City, New York: Doubleday, Page & Company, 1919.
- The Shield of Silence. Garden City, New York: Doubleday, Page & Company, 1921.
- At the Crossroads. Garden City, New York: Doubleday, Page & Company, 1922.
- The Tenth Woman. Garden City, New York: Doubleday, Page & Company, 1923.
- Smothered Fires. Garden City, New York: Doubleday, Page & Company, 1924.
- Joline. Garden City, New York: Doubleday, Page & Company, 1925.
- Out of the Clay. Garden City, New York: Doubleday, Page & Company, 1926.
- Penelope's Web. Garden City, New York: Doubleday, Doran & Company, 1928.
- The Piper's Price. Garden City, New York: Doubleday, Doran & Company, 1929.
- Fate Is a Fool. Garden City, New York: Doubleday, Doran & Company, c. 1930.
- The Flame of Devotion. Garden City, New York: Doubleday, Doran & Company, 1932.
- Strange Understanding. Garden City, New York: Doubleday, 1933.
- Karen's Destiny. Garden City, New York: Doubleday, Doran & Company, 1934.
- The Mark of Cain. Garden City, New York: Doubleday, Doran & Company, 1935.
- Sacrifice for Love. Garden City, New York: Doubleday, Doran & Company, 1936.
- Can This Be Wrong?. Garden City, New York: Doubleday, Doran & Company, 1937.
- Lori, Daughter of Kit. Garden City, New York: Doubleday, Doran & Company, 1938.
- The Road Beyond. New York: Doubleday, Doran & Company, 1939.
- Doctor Hargreave's Assistant. New York: Doubleday, Doran & Company, 1940.
- The Long Way Back. New York: Doubleday, Doran & Company, 1941.
- Windy Corners. Garden City, New York: Doubleday, Doran & Company, 1942.
- Terry. Garden City, New York: Doubleday, 1943.
- The Story of Terry: A Romantic Novel. New York: Trendle-Merrill, 1945.
