= A Lost Lady =

1923 novel by Willa Cather

- First edition
- Author: Willa Cather
- Language: English
- Publisher: Alfred A. Knopf
- Publication date: September 1923
- Publication place: United States
- Media type: Print (Hardback)

A Lost Lady is a 1923 novel by American writer Willa Cather. It tells the story of Marian Forrester and her husband, Captain Daniel Forrester, who live in the western town of Sweet Water along the Transcontinental Railroad. Throughout the story, Marian—a wealthy married socialite—is pursued by a variety of suitors. Her social decline is seen to represent the end of the American frontier. F. Scott Fitzgerald's 1925 novel, The Great Gatsby was significantly influenced by this work.

== Plot summary ==
Niel Herbert, a young man who grows up in Sweet Water, witnesses the slow decline of Marian Forrester, for whom he feels very deeply, and also of the West itself from the idealized age of noble pioneers to the age of capitalist exploitation.

== Major characters ==
- Niel Herbert – the main character who is a young boy when he meets the beautiful Mrs. Forrester. He falls in love with what she represents and struggles to preserve his boyhood image of her. After watching her have an affair with Frank Ellinger and later, as a widow, with lawyer Ivy Peters, he leaves Sweet Water. By the end of the novel, Niel realizes that his love of Marian was based on Captain Forrester's idealization of her.
- Mrs. Marian Forrester – a charming socialite married to Captain Forrester. The young Niel falls in love with her beauty and apparent refinement. He is later dismayed to discover her affair with Frank Ellinger. After her husband's death, the widow becomes the mistress of Ivy Peters, who runs her estate. She eventually leaves the town and moves to California, dying before Niel sees her again.
- Captain Daniel Forrester – an aging man of the Pioneer generation who made his fortune building track for the railroads when the continent was crossed. He is proud of his beautiful, sophisticated wife. The novel opens at a time when he has already been physically destroyed by a fall from a horse. After suffering two strokes, he eventually dies, signifying the end of the pioneering era.
- Frank Ellinger – a muscular bachelor and businessman of the Gilded Age generation. Frank is Mrs. Forrester's lover and visits her when the Captain is away from the house. He marries Constance Ogden.
- Ivy Peters – a cocky and pretentious young man of the Jazz Age generation, who later becomes a lawyer. He becomes very wealthy and manages the Forrester estate, taking the widowed Marian as a mistress. He eventually owns the estate.
- Constance Ogden – a Southern girl who is Niel's age and is envious of Marian's beauty. She later marries Frank Ellinger.
- Judge Pommeroy – Niel's uncle, he is a lawyer who falls on hard times in much the same way the Forresters do.

== Literary significance and criticism ==
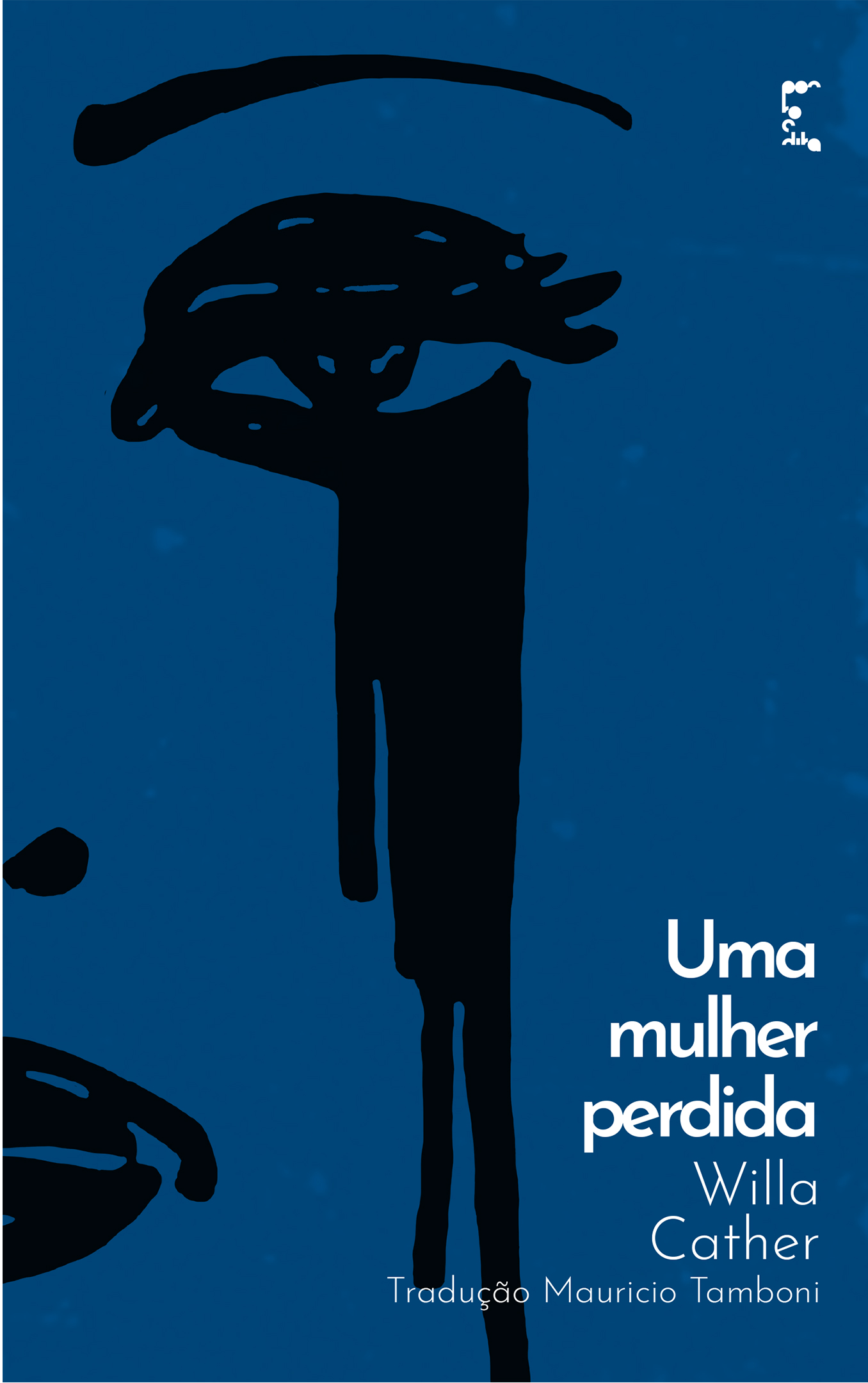
Cover of the Brazilian Portuguese edition

The novel has a robust symbolic framework. Critical approaches have noted that the character of Marian Forrester symbolically embodies both the American Dream, as "focused on self" and the gradual decline of the American West.

== Legacy and influence ==
F. Scott Fitzgerald acknowledged the influence of this novel; he borrowed many of its themes and elements. Marian Forrester, in particular, partly inspired his Daisy Buchanan character in The Great Gatsby. Fitzgerald later wrote a letter to Cather apologizing for any unintentional plagiarism.

== Media adaptations ==
The first film version of the novel was created in 1924, adapted by screenwriter Dorothy Farnum. Directed by Harry Beaumont, the film starred Irene Rich, Matt Moore, June Marlowe, and John Roche.

The novel was adapted again, very loosely, as a film of the same name in 1934 by Gene Markey. It starred Barbara Stanwyck as Marian Forrester. The film did not live up to the novel's reputation and is generally regarded as mediocre. Cather was so displeased with the film that she forbade any further film or stage adaptations of her work.
