= Their Hour =

1928 silent comedy film

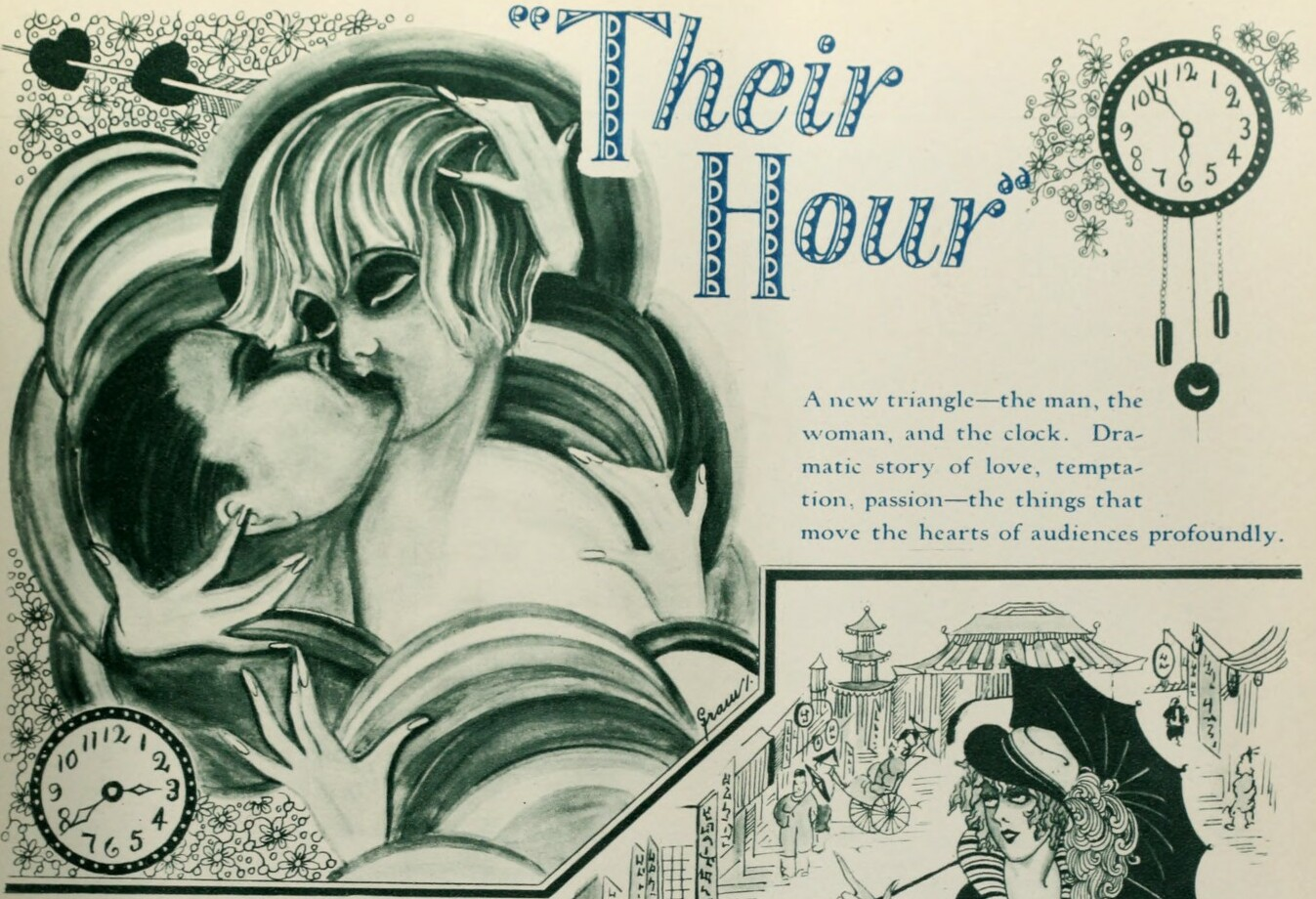
- Directed by: Alfred Raboch
- Written by: Albert S. Le Vino; Viola Brothers Shore
- Produced by: John M. Stahl
- Starring: John Harron; Dorothy Sebastian; June Marlowe
- Cinematography: Faxon M. Dean
- Edited by: Martin G. Cohn
- Production company: Tiffany Pictures
- Distributed by: Tiffany Pictures
- Release date: March 1, 1928
- Running time: 60 minutes
- Country: United States
- Languages: Silent; English intertitles

Their Hour is a lost 1928 American silent comedy film directed by Alfred Raboch and starring John Harron, Dorothy Sebastian and June Marlowe.

== Premise ==
A shipping clerk falls under the spell of a socialite, but eventually returns to the girl from his own social class who really loves him.

== Cast ==
- John Harron as Jerry
- Dorothy Sebastian as Cora
- June Marlowe as Peggy
- John Roche as Bob
- Huntley Gordon as Mr. Shaw
- Myrtle Stedman as Peggy's Mother
- John Steppling as Peggy's Father
- Holmes Herbert as Cora's Father

== Preservation ==
With no holdings located in archives, Their Hour is considered a lost film.

== Bibliography ==
- Sharot, Stephen. Love and Marriage Across Social Classes in American Cinema. Springer, 2016.
