= John Harron =

American actor

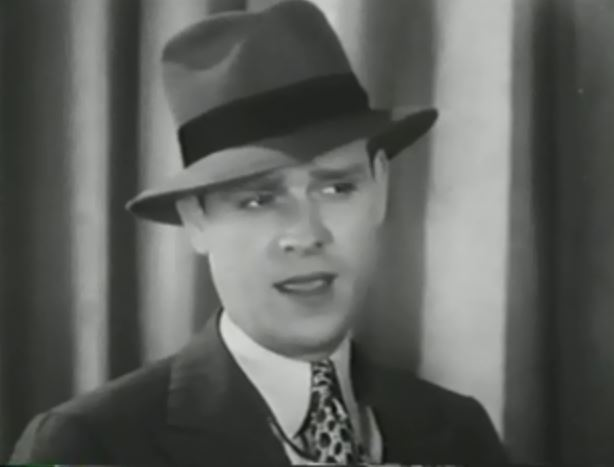
- The Murder in the Museum (1934)
- Born: March 31, 1904; New York City, U.S.
- Died: November 24, 1939 (aged 35); Seattle, Washington, U.S.
- Years active: 1918–1939
- Spouse: Betty Westmore (m. 1929)
- Children: 1
- Relatives: Robert Harron (brother); Mary Harron (sister)

John Harron (March 31, 1904 – November 24, 1939) was an American actor. He appeared in more than 160 films between 1918 and 1939.

Born on March 31, 1904, in New York City, he was the brother of actor Robert Harron and of actress Mary Harron.

Harron graduated from Santa Clara University. His film debut came in Through the Back Door (1921). After acting for Universal, he was under contract to Warner Bros. Harron "achieved great success on the silent screen but was reduced to minor roles or minor films with the coming of sound."

Harron died in Seattle, Washington from spinal meningitis. He is buried in Calvary Cemetery in Los Angeles.

== Selected filmography ==
- Through the Back Door (1921)
- The Fox (1921)
- The Grim Comedian (1921)
- The Five Dollar Baby (1922)
- The Ragged Heiress (1922)
- Love in the Dark (1922)
- The West~Bound Limited (1923)
- Dulcy (1923)
- The Fire Patrol (1924)
- Behind the Curtain (1924)
- What Shall I Do? (1924)
- Below the Line (1925)
- My Wife and I (1925)
- The Wife Who Wasn't Wanted (1925)
- Satan in Sables (1925)
- Old Shoes (1925)
- The Night Cry (1926)
- Hell-Bent for Heaven (1926)
- The Boy Friend (1926)
- Rose of the Tenements (1926)
- The False Alarm (1926)
- Love Makes 'Em Wild (1927)
- Closed Gates (1927)
- Once and Forever (1927)
- Night Life (1927)
- Naughty (1927)
- Green Grass Widows (1928)
- The Man in Hobbles (1928)
- Their Hour (1928)
- Street Girl (1929)
- The Czar of Broadway (1930)
- The Easiest Way (1931)
- Laugh and Get Rich (1931)
- The Law of the Tong (1931)
- Beauty Parlor (1932)
- Sister to Judas (1932)
- White Zombie (1932)
- Talent Scout (1937)
- The Invisible Menace (1938)
- The Roaring Twenties (1939) as Soldier
- The Oklahoma Kid (1939)
- Lincoln in the White House (1939)
