= The Wife Who Wasn't Wanted =

1925 film

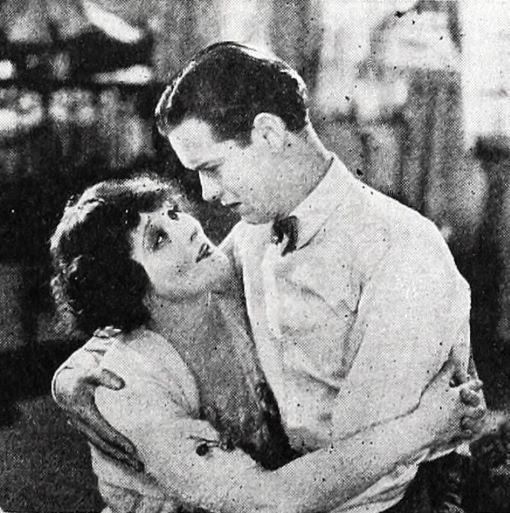
- Still with Rich and Gordon
- Directed by: James Flood
- Screenplay by: Bess Meredyth
- Based on: The Wife Who Wasn't Wanted by Gertie Wentworth-James
- Starring: Irene Rich; Huntley Gordon; John Harron; Gayne Whitman; June Marlowe; Don Alvarado
- Cinematography: John J. Mescall
- Production company: Warner Bros.
- Distributed by: Warner Bros.
- Release date: September 12, 1925
- Running time: 70 minutes
- Country: United States
- Language: Silent (English intertitles)

The Wife Who Wasn't Wanted is a 1925 American silent drama film directed by James Flood and written by Bess Meredyth. It is based on the 1923 novel of the same name by Gertie de S. Wentworth-James, which was itself influenced by the 1922 trial of Herbert Rowse Armstrong. The film, which stars Irene Rich, Huntley Gordon, John Harron, Gayne Whitman, June Marlowe, and Don Alvarado, was released by Warner Bros. on September 12, 1925.

== Plot ==
As described in a film magazine reviews, Bob Mannering is riding in a motor car with others when the car hits and kills a woman. He is accused of causing the death. His father, district attorney John Mannering, decides to prosecute Bob for homicide. Bob's mother, to prevent the prosecution of her fast-living son, tries to cause her husband's political ruin by causing a scandal. She goes to a hotel with a crook who is in the employ of Mannering's political rival, Jerry Wallace. She is double crossed and, to escape utter disgrace, flees to a secluded hotel that becomes engulfed in a forest fire. During the progress of the fire, she meets Diane, who confesses that it was she who was driving the death car. Mrs. Mannering returns to her family and Bob is freed.

== Cast ==
- Irene Rich as Mrs. John Mannering
- Huntley Gordon as John Mannering
- John Harron as Bob Mannering
- Gayne Whitman as Jerome Wallace
- June Marlowe as Mary Paterson
- Don Alvarado as Theo
- Edward Peil Sr. as 'Slick' Jennings
- George Kuwa as Japanese Servant
- James Quinn as Simi
- Wilfred Lucas as Judge Bledsoe
- Gertrude Astor as Greta
- George Pearce as Editor
- Elinor Fair as Diane

== Status ==
The Wife Who Wasn't Wanted is considered lost as of 2016 by the National Film Preservation Board.
