= Heinie Conklin =

American actor and comedian (1880–1959)

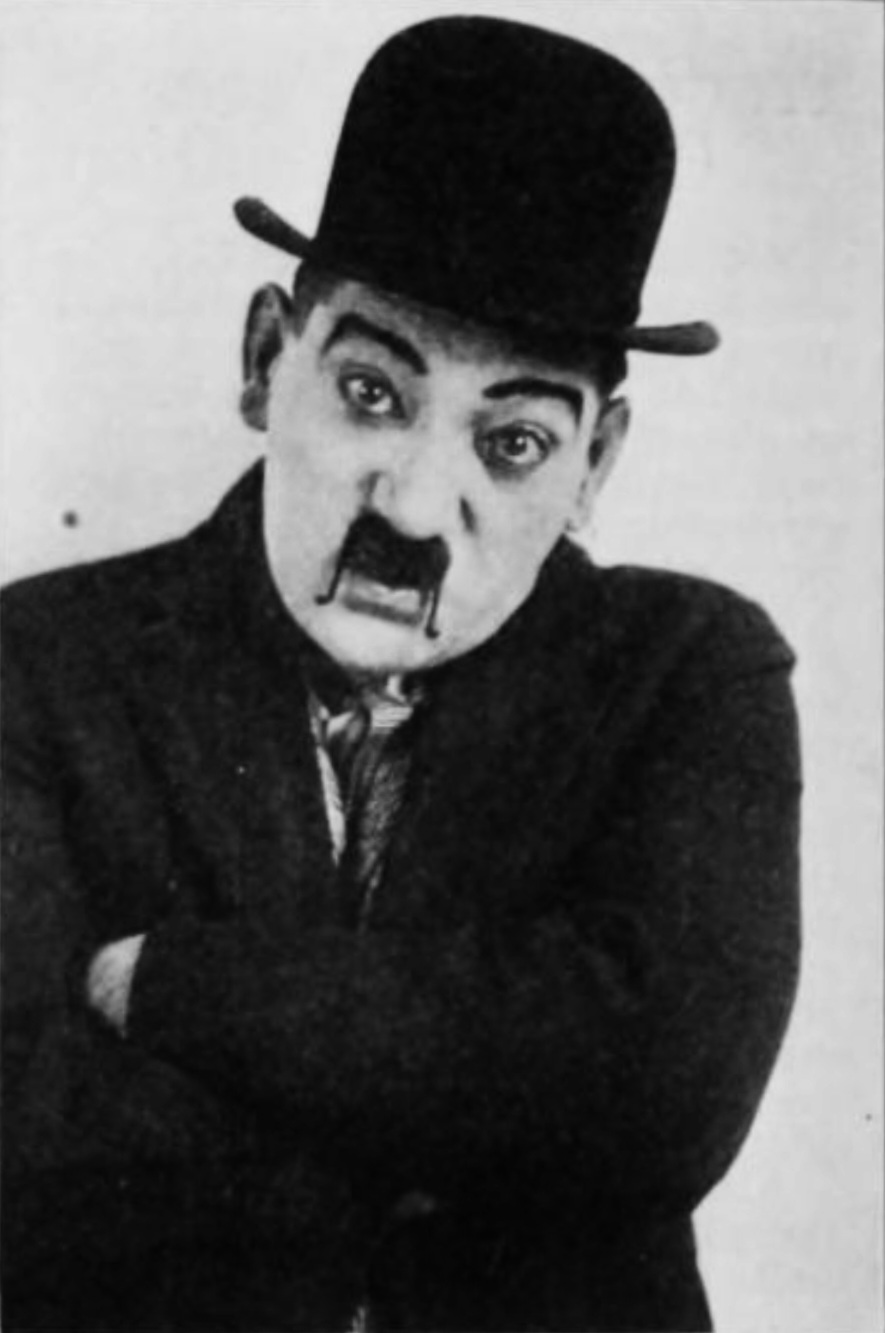
- Conklin in 1921
- Born: Charles John Conklin; July 16, 1880; San Francisco, California, U.S.
- Died: July 30, 1959 (aged 79); Hollywood, California, U.S.
- Resting place: Chapel of the Pines Crematory
- Occupations: Actor; comedian
- Years active: 1915–1959
- Spouse: Irene Blake
- Children: 3

Heinie Conklin (born Charles John Conklin; July 16, 1880 – July 30, 1959) was an American actor and comedian whose career began in the silent film era.

== Early years ==
Conklin was born Charles John Conklin on July 16, 1880, in San Francisco, California. He attended San Francisco's public schools.

== Career ==
In vaudeville, Conklin headlined shows on the Keith and Orpheum circuits. He was billed as Charles Conklin until 1927. He began working in films in 1915 after 17 years on stage and in vaudeville.

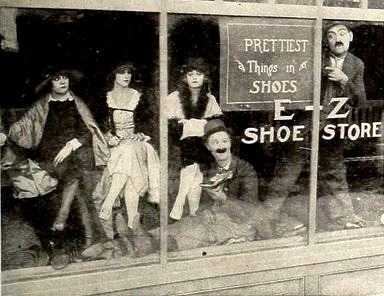
Still with Ben Turpin and Conklin as shoe salesmen in Cupid's Day Off (1919)

One of the original Keystone Cops, Conklin wore makeup of heavy eyebrow lining and a thin, upside-down, painted-on variation of Kaiser Wilhelm's mustache.

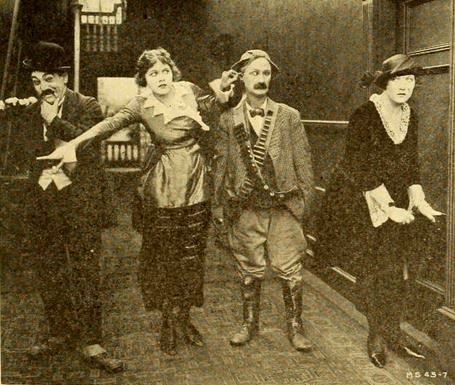
Conklin on left in No Mother to Guide Him

In areas where anti-German sentiments still ran high during the post-World War I era, Conklin was billed as Charlie Lynn. One of Conklin's first talking pictures was All Quiet on the Western Front as a hospital patient. For the rest of his career in talking pictures, he had small roles in two-reelers which starred The Three Stooges, Andy Clyde, Hugh Herbert and Harry Langdon. Conklin's last billed movie was Abbott and Costello Meet the Keystone Kops.

Conklin's period at Keystone was contemporary with that of Chester Conklin, a more popular Keystone comedian who occasionally played lead roles in Keystone short films. The two Conklins were not related.

== Personal life and death ==
Conklin married Irene Blake. They had one daughter and two sons. He died in Hollywood, California, on July 30, 1959.

== Partial filmography ==
- A Submarine Pirate (1915) (film debut)
- Yankee Doodle in Berlin (1919) - Prussian Guard Drill Leader
- Salome vs. Shenandoah (1919) - Actor Playing Captain of Artillery/Roman Slave
- A Small Town Idol (1921) - Jester in Movie (uncredited)
- Beau Brummel (1924) - Bit Role (uncredited)
- The Fire Patrol (1924) - Fireman (uncredited)
- Find Your Man (1924) - Lumberjack
- The Cyclone Rider (1924) - Remus
- Troubles of a Bride (1924) - Jeff
- A Fool and His Money (1925) - Citizen
- The Gold Rush (1925) - Prospector (uncredited)
- Below the Line (1925) - Deputy Sheriff
- Red Hot Tires (1925) - Coachman
- Seven Sinners (1925) - 'Scarlet Fever' Sanders
- The Clash of the Wolves (1925) - Alkali Bill
- Hogan's Alley (1925) - The Stranger's Friend
- The Fighting Edge (1926) - Chuck
- The Night Cry (1926) - Tony
- The Sap (1926) - Wienie Duke
- Hard Boiled (1926) - Bill Grimes
- Fig Leaves (1926) - Eddie McSwiggen
- Whispering Wires (1926) - Jasper, the Butler
- Beware of Widows (1927) - Captain
- Silk Stockings (1927) - Watchman
- The Girl in the Pullman (1927) - Old Black Joe
- Ham and Eggs at the Front (1927) - Eggs
- The Circus (1928)
- Show of Shows (1929)
- All Quiet on the Western Front (1930)
- Soup to Nuts (1930) Fireman playing checkers (with Ted Healy and his stooges)
- Just Imagine (1930)
- A Connecticut Yankee (1931)
- Iron Man (1931)
- The Passionate Plumber (1932)
- The Wet Parade (1932)
- What Price Hollywood? (1932)
- Frisco Jenny (1932)
- Baby Face (1933)
- Voltaire (1933)
- The Bowery (1933)
- She Done Him Wrong (1933)
- The Captain Hates the Sea (1934)
- Broadway Bill (1934)
- Ruggles of Red Gap (1935)
- Man on the Flying Trapeze (1935)
- Society Doctor (1935)
- Les Misérables (1935)
- Steamboat Round the Bend (1935)
- Barbary Coast (1935)
- Modern Times (1936)
- Come and Get It (1936)
- After the Thin Man (1936)
- Mountain Justice (1937)
- Stella Dallas (1937)
- Double Wedding (1937)
- One Hundred Men and a Girl (1937)
- Professor Beware (1938)
- Little Miss Broadway (1938)
- Flat Foot Stooges {1939] (Traffic Policeman)
- Sergeant Madden (1939)
- Frontier Marshal (1939)
- Hollywood Cavalcade (1939)
- Flowing Gold (1940)
- The Westerner (1940)
- Lady from Louisiana (1941)
- Here Comes Mr. Jordan (1941)
- I Wake Up Screaming (1941)
- Honky Tonk (1941)
- The Pride of the Yankees (1942)
- Tramp, Tramp, Tramp (1942)
- To the Shores of Tripoli (1942)
- Hers to Hold (1943)
- Crazy House (1943)
- Christmas Holiday (1944)
- The Great Moment (1944)
- Lost in a Harem (1944)
- Enter Arsene Lupin (1944)
- Can't Help Singing (1944)
- Without Love (1945)
- Escape in the Fog (1945)
- The Hoodlum Saint (1946)
- The Best Years of Our Lives (1946)
- The Unfaithful (1947)
- The Perils of Pauline (1947)
- My Wild Irish Rose (1947)
- A Double Life (1947)
- The Walls of Jericho (1948)
- Big City (1948)
- Road House (1948)
- The Stratton Story (1949)
- Bad Men of Tombstone (1949)
- The Set-Up (1949)
- The Lady Gambles (1949)
- The Beautiful Blonde from Bashful Bend (1949)
- Ambush (1950)
- When Willie Comes Marching Home (1950)
- The Gunfighter (1950)
- Broken Arrow (1950)
- Santa Fe (1951)
- Journey Into Light (1951)
- With a Song in My Heart (1952)
- Stars and Stripes Forever (1952)
- Lure of the Wilderness (1952)
- Because of You (1952)
- Powder River (1953)
- A Lion Is in the Streets (1953)
- Prince Valiant (1954)
- The Black Dakotas (1954)
- A Star Is Born (1954)
- Broken Lance (1954)
- Destry (1954)
- Abbott and Costello Meet the Keystone Kops (1955)
- The Spoilers (1955)
- How to Be Very, Very Popular (1955)
- Love Me Tender (1956)
- Jeanne Eagels (1957)
- Man of a Thousand Faces (1957)
- A Nice Little Bank That Should Be Robbed (1958)
- Gunmen from Laredo (1959) (final film)
