= John Roche (actor) =

American actor (1893–1952)

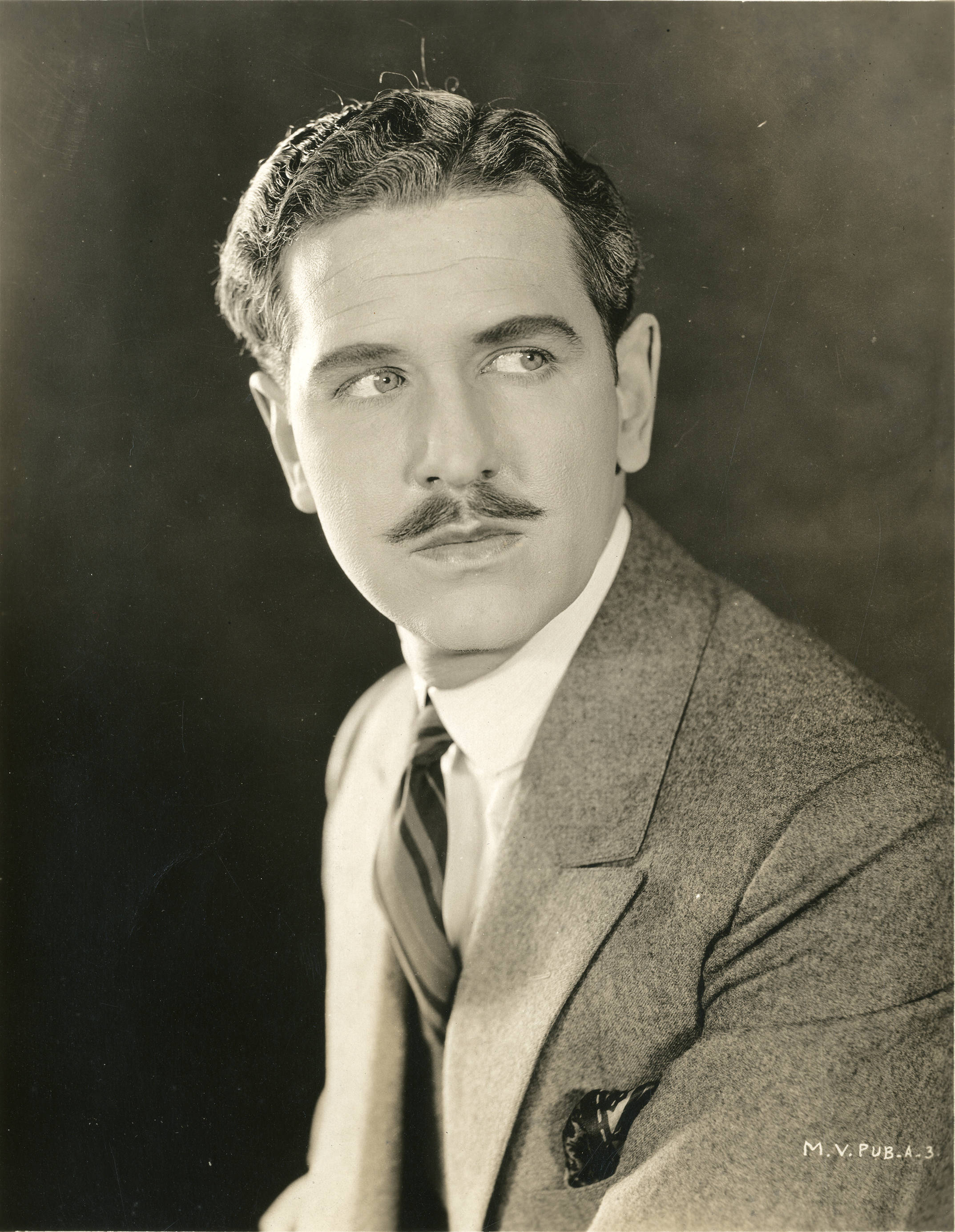
- John Roche in 1924
- Born: John Conklin Roche; May 6, 1893; Penn Yan, New York, United States
- Died: November 10, 1952 (aged 59); Hollywood Presbyterian Hospital, Los Angeles, California, United States
- Occupation: Actor
- Years active: 1910–1946

John Roche (May 6, 1893 – November 10, 1952) was an American actor of the stage and screen.

== Biography ==
John Conklin Roche was born in the small village of Penn Yan, New York, on May 6, 1893. His father purportedly died by the time of the 1900 census. By 1910, Roche worked as a stenographer at a flour mill. He graduated from the University of Rochester, after which he began his acting career touring with stock companies during the 1910s and early 1920s. By the time of the 1920 census, he listed himself as divorced and worked as a motor truck engineer in Manhattan. In 1922, he broke into the film industry with a featured role in The Good Provider. During the 1920s, he acted in both films and on stage, including several roles in Broadway productions, such as R.U.R. (1922). By 7 April 1930, he lived in Los Angeles with his partner, Newell Vanderhoef, with whom he stayed until at least 1950. He acted steadily in films until 1936, in both featured and supporting roles. In the mid-1930s he took a break from films, focusing on the stage, including directing the play, Mackerel Skies, which had a short run at the Playhouse Theatre in New York in 1936. By 1940, he took up regular work selling jewelry at a department store. Roche returned to films in 1941, with a small role in the Norma Shearer vehicle, We Were Dancing (1942), based on the Noël Coward play of the same name. Over the course of his career he was involved in over six Broadway productions and appeared in over 50 films. His final screen appearance was in 1946's The Brute Man.

Roche died on November 10, 1952, at Hollywood Presbyterian Hospital. His remains were interred at Holy Cross Cemetery. Vanderhoef was not named in his obituary, though it states he was survived by his brother, Angelo James Roche, Esq. Angelo also had a partner, James H Corliss.

== Filmography ==
(According to AFI database)

- The Good Provider (1922)
- Bag and Baggage (1923)
- Lucretia Lombard (1923)
- Cornered (1924)
- Flowing Gold (1924)
- Her Marriage Vow (1924)
- K – The Unknown (1924)
- A Lost Lady (1924)
- The Tenth Woman (1924)
- Bobbed Hair (1925)
- A Broadway Butterfly (1925)
- Kiss Me Again (1925)
- The Love Hour (1925)
- Marry Me (1925)
- My Wife and I (1925)
- Recompense (1925)
- Scandal Proof (1925)
- Her Big Night (1926)
- The Man Upstairs (1926)
- Midnight Lovers (1926)
- The Return of Peter Grimm (1926)
- The Truthful Sex (1926)
- Don Juan (1927)
- Diamond Handcuffs (1928)
- Uncle Tom's Cabin (1928)
- Their Hour (1928)
- The Awful Truth (1929)
- The Donovan Affair (1929)
- The Dream Melody (1929)
- This Thing Called Love (1929)
- The Unholy Night (1929)
- Monte Carlo (1930)
- Sin Takes a Holiday (1930)
- The Cohens and Kellys in Hollywood (1932)
- Winner Take All (1932)
- Lady with a Past (1932)
- Prosperity (1932)
- Beauty for Sale (1933)
- Redheads on Parade (1935)
- Just My Luck (1936)
- Nobody's Fool (1936)
- Klondike Fury (1942)
- My Gal Sal (1942)
- Springtime in the Rockies (1942)
- Sunday Punch (1942)
- We Were Dancing (1942)
- Her Primitive Man (1944)
- The Spider Woman (1944)
- Atlantic City (1944)
- It's a Pleasure! (1945)
- State Fair (1945)
- Where Do We Go from Here? (1945)
- The Brute Man (1946)
- The Dark Horse (1946)
- Idea Girl (1946)
