= Below the Line (1925 film) =

1925 film by Herman C. Raymaker

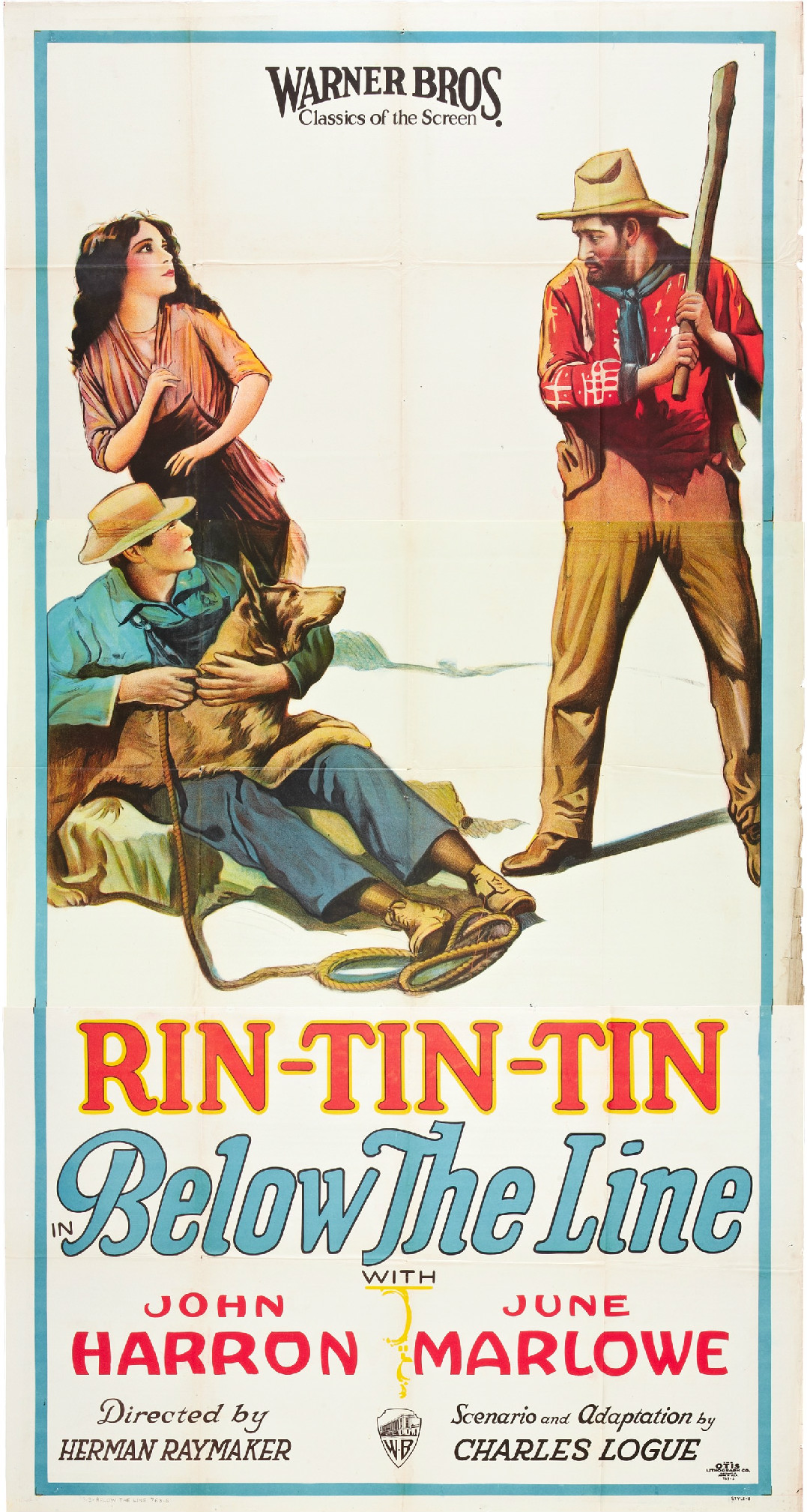
- Lobby poster
- Directed by: Herman C. Raymaker
- Written by: Charles A. Logue
- Starring: Rin Tin Tin; John Harron; June Marlowe
- Cinematography: John J. Mescall; Bert Shipman
- Production company: Warner Bros.
- Distributed by: Warner Bros.
- Release date: September 26, 1925
- Running time: 70 minutes
- Country: United States
- Language: Silent (English intertitles)
- Budget: $74,000
- Box office: $268,000

Below the Line is a 1925 American silent drama film featuring canine star Rin Tin Tin and directed by Herman C. Raymaker. It was produced and distributed by Warner Bros.

== Plot ==
As described in a film magazine review, a police dog is shipped South to a sheriff, but en route he jumps from the train and is taken in by a man who later sells him to another man. He who first had the dog enters the home of the second man to rob it, but the dog kills him. The dead man's brother sets bloodhounds on the trail of the hero, and he and his finance are tracked down. The police dog goes to their rescue.

== Cast ==
- Rin Tin Tin as himself
- John Harron as Donald Cass
- June Marlowe as May Barton
- Pat Hartigan as Jamber Niles
- Victor Potel as "Cuckoo" Niles
- Charles Conklin as Deputy Sheriff
- Gilbert Clayton as Reverend Barton
- Edith Yorke as Mrs. Cass
- Taylor Duncan as Sheriff

== Box office ==
According to Warner Bros records, the film earned $235,000 domestically and $33,000 foreign.

== Preservation status ==
There is extant an abridged / incomplete copy of Below the Line in a private collector's possession. It was transferred onto 16mm film by Associated Artists Productions in the 1950s and shown on television.
