= Maud Cressall =

British actress (1886–1962)

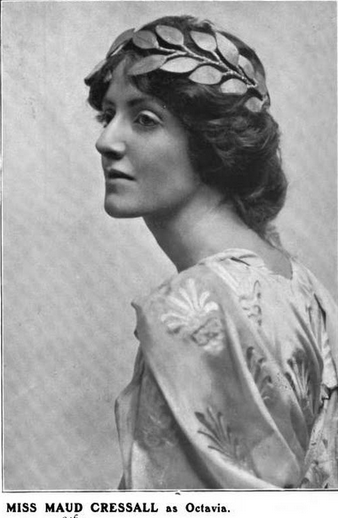
- Maud Cressall, from a 1907 publication.
- Born: 5 December 1886; Demerara, British Guiana
- Died: May 1962 (aged 75); England, United Kingdom
- Occupation: Actress
- Years active: 1918-1923 (film)

Maud Cressall (1886–1962) was a British stage and film actress. Largely a theatre actress, she also appeared in nine silent films. She was at one point the protégé of W.S. Gilbert.

== Filmography ==
- The Man and the Moment (1918)
- Whosoever Shall Offend (1919)
- Two Little Wooden Shoes (1920)
- The Scarlet Kiss (1920)
- The Barton Mystery (1920)
- The Tinted Venus (1921)
- Mist in the Valley (1923)
- Strangling Threads (1923)
- The Naked Man (1923)

== Bibliography ==
- Stedman, Jane W. W.S. Gilbert: A Classic Victorian and His Theatre. Oxford University Press, 1996.
