= A Lost Lady (1934 film) =

1934 film by Alfred E. Green, Phil Rosen

- Theatrical release poster
- Directed by: Alfred E. Green; Phil Rosen (uncredited)
- Screenplay by: Gene Markey; Kathryn Scola
- Based on: A Lost Lady; 1923 novel by Willa Cather
- Produced by: James Seymour
- Starring: Barbara Stanwyck; Frank Morgan; Ricardo Cortez
- Cinematography: Sidney Hickox
- Edited by: Owen Marks
- Music by: Ray Heindorf; Heinz Roemheld
- Production company: Warner Bros. Pictures
- Distributed by: Warner Bros. Pictures
- Release dates: October 3, 1934 (New York); October 25, 1934 (Los Angeles)
- Running time: 61 minutes
- Country: United States
- Language: English

A Lost Lady is a 1934 American drama film directed by Alfred E. Green and starring Barbara Stanwyck, Frank Morgan and Ricardo Cortez. It is based on the 1923 novel A Lost Lady by Willa Cather, with a screenplay by Gene Markey and Kathryn Scola. Warner Bros. had produced a 1924 silent film based on the story, starring Irene Rich.

== Plot ==
Ned and Marian, soon to be married, are confronted by a man while leaving a formal party. The man accuses Ned of having an affair with the man's wife and shoots Ned dead.

Marian travels to a resort in the Canadian Rockies, hoping to overcome her emotional withdrawal. One day while walking alone, she falls from a ledge and injures her leg. She is discovered and rescued by Dan Forrester and his dog Sandy. Dan visits Marian every day, although she remains upset about her fiancé's death. Before he returns home, Dan asks Marian to marry him. She refuses at first, telling him that she does not love him, but he is undeterred. At the last moment, she changes her mind and accepts his proposal. However, after the wedding, they sleep in separate bedrooms.

Dan and Marian move to Chicago, where he heads a successful law firm. He pampers Marian, building her a mansion in the country, and helps her to overcome her depression. One day, pilot Frank Ellinger is forced to perform an emergency landing on the Forrester estate after his airplane's fuel supply is depleted. Mistaking Marian for a servant, Frank grabs and kisses her. She slaps him in the face and leaves, but emotions are stirred within her.

Marian and Frank meet unexpectedly at a social event. She rejects his advances, but he persists. When Dan travels to New York for three weeks on business, Frank sees her every day, and Marian soon falls in love with him. When Dan returns, Marian tells him the news, and he is devastated and cannot sleep, although he has a major corporate case set for trial the following day. At the trial, he collapses and suffers a heart attack. Marian, who had already packed her belongings to begin a life with Frank, refuses to leave Dan's side in spite of Frank's pressure. She realizes that she has finally come to love her husband, and she tells him so.

== Cast ==
- Barbara Stanwyck as Marian Ormsby Forrester
- Frank Morgan as Daniel "Dan" Forrester
- Ricardo Cortez as Frank Ellinger
- Lyle Talbot as Neil Herbert
- Phillip Reed as Ned Montgomery
- Hobart Cavanaugh as Robert, Forrester's butler
- Henry Kolker as John Ormsby
- Rafaela Ottiano as Rosa, Marian's maid
- Edward McWade as Simpson, Forrester's receptionist
- Walter Walker as Judge Hardy, one of Dan's friends
- Samuel S. Hinds as Jim Sloane
- Willie Fung as Forrester's Cook
- Jameson Thomas as Lord Verrington

== Reception ==
In a contemporary review for The New York Times, critic Andre Sennwald wrote:

The present variation, to one who cannot forget the haunting beauty of the book, is like a stranger in the house. For the particular charm of Miss Cather's work was her method, and that has been rather definitely lost in the process of transition to the screen. The original lost lady was presented through the eyes of a sensitive boy. Now she walks the screen in plain sight, a woman married to a man she does not love, tormented by her need of a man she cannot have. It simmers down to that, finally, with Barbara Stanwyck, Frank Morgan and Ricardo Cortez to make a competent, unexciting and familiar movie of it. ... Change the title, remove Miss Cather's name from the credit line, and you have a made-to-order program film.

A review in the Los Angeles Times read: "[O]ne simply can't make up one's mind to care either about her being lost or found. The trouble seems to be that Willa Cather's story, with its deep implications, has been given a very superficial screen interpretation, with no real characterizations or psychological understanding. The heroine is an entirely unsympathetic character, an impulsive creature with no mind of her own; the hero a weak individual."

Cather was so displeased with the film that she prohibited any further film or stage adaptations of her work.
