= James Flood =

American director

James Joseph Flood (July 31, 1895 – February 5, 1953) was an American film director.

Born in New York City, Flood became an assistant director with Biograph in 1912 and was active through 1952.

== Career ==
When working on The Swellhead, Flood decided he wanted to change a scene. He told his plan to actor James Gleason who was also an accomplished playwright and he re-wrote the scene. Actress Marion Shilling then had to quickly learn and execute the new dialogue. "I was a fast study, memorized the scene in a few minutes and we did the scene in one take. Mr. Flood put his arms around me and said, 'You g.d. little trouper.'"

== Personal life ==
Fellow director William Beaudine was his longtime friend and brother-in-law; actor and producer Bobby Anderson was his nephew (Bobby's mother was James's wife's sister).

== Death ==
Flood died of complications after surgery in Hollywood on February 4, 1953. He was 57.

== Selected filmography ==
- Times Have Changed (1923)
- The Woman Hater (1925)
- The Man Without a Conscience (1925)
- The Wife Who Wasn't Wanted (1925)
- Satan in Sables (1925)
- Why Girls Go Back Home (1926)
- The Lady in Ermine (1927)
- Three Hours (1927)
- The Count of Ten (1928)
- Domestic Meddlers (1928)
- Marriage by Contract (1928)
- Mister Antonio (1929)
- Whispering Winds (1929)
- Midstream (1929)
- The Swellhead (1930)
- The She-Wolf (1931)
- Under Cover Man (1932)
- The Mouthpiece (1932) co-directed with Elliott Nugent
- Life Begins (1932) co-directed with Elliott Nugent
- All of Me (1934)
- Such Women Are Dangerous (1934)
- Wings in the Dark (1935)
- Shanghai (1935)
- Lonely Road (1936), a.k.a. Scotland Yard Commands
- The Big Fix (1947)
- Stepchild (1947)
