= June Marlowe =

American actress (1903–1984)

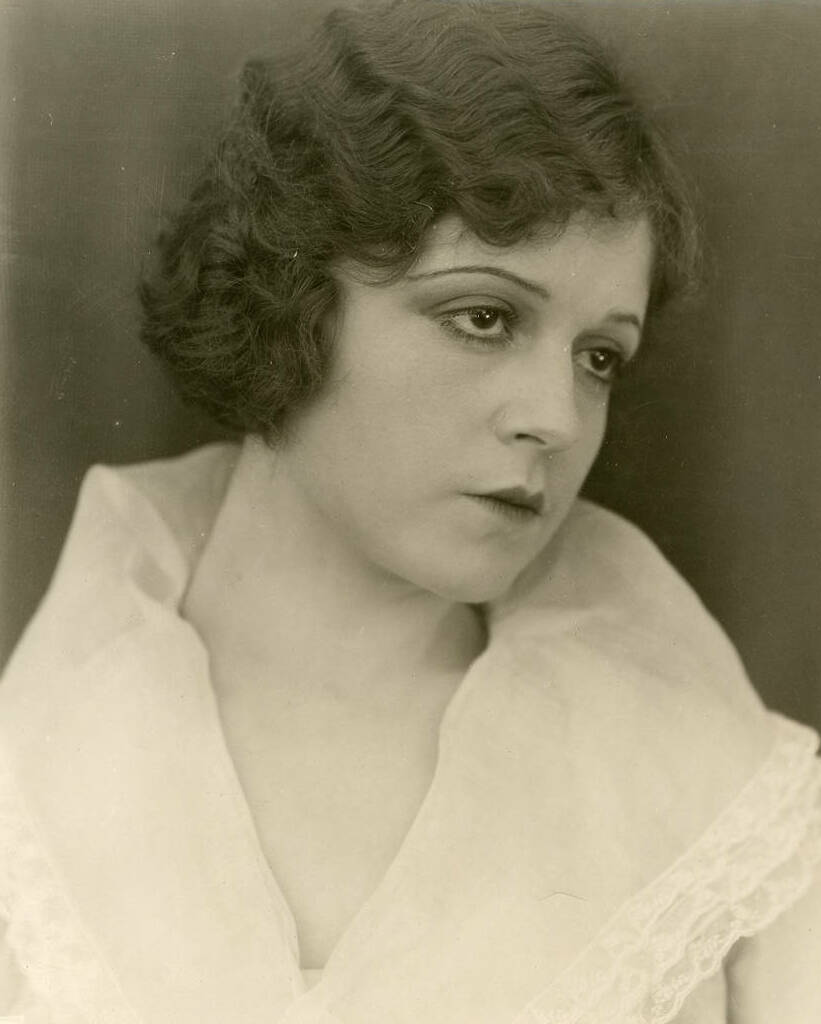
- Marlowe in 1924
- Born: Gisela Valaria (Note: Often spelled Valeria.) Goetten; November 6, 1903; St. Cloud, Minnesota, US
- Died: March 10, 1984 (aged 80); Burbank, California, US
- Resting place: Cathedral of Our Lady of the Angels
- Occupation: Actress
- Years active: 1923–1978
- Spouse: Rodney Searle Sprigg Sr. (m. 1933; died 1982)

June Marlowe (Note: Not to be confused with: June Marlowe, born in 1918–1919 as Martha Jane Black, an American actress (in films 1935–1947), and a wife of film director Tito Davison; they are often thought to be the same actress.; June Marlowe, born in 1929 as June A. Marchini, the first wife of Spike Milligan.; June Marlow, born in 1931 as Jean C. Moulder, an English actress, and a singer with Eric Winstone's band and The Stargazers (vocal ensemble).; June Malo, born in 1910 as Juanita Ida Triggs, an English singer with Jack Hylton's band, and second wife of snooker champion Joe Davis.) (born Gisela Valaria Goetten; November 6, 1903 – March 10, 1984) was an American film actress who began her career during the silent film era. She was best known for her role as "Miss Crabtree" in the Our Gang shorts.

== Career ==
Marlowe was born in St. Cloud, Minnesota. Her mother was Austrian, and her father's parents were German. She was a prolific actress in silent films during the 1920s, appearing in films opposite John Barrymore and Rin Tin Tin. She began her acting career shortly after her 1923 graduation from Hollywood High School, and was signed to a contract by Warner Brothers in 1924.

In 1925, she became one of the WAMPAS Baby Stars. In 1928, she was an actress under contract with Universal Studios.

Her career did well until the introduction of talkies. Marlowe did not make an easy transition, and by 1930 she was starting to drift away from acting.

By chance, she happened to meet director Robert F. McGowan one day in a Los Angeles department store. McGowan was searching for an actress to portray the schoolteacher in the Our Gang series of children's comedies. After producer Hal Roach suggested that brunette Marlowe don a blonde wig to match the hair of the lead kid in the series, Jackie Cooper, she was given the part of Miss Crabtree.

Marlowe in her signature role of Miss Crabtree from the 1930 Our Gang short School's Out

Marlowe and Cooper were paired together in three Our Gang films, Teacher's Pet, School's Out and Love Business. She also had a small role in 1931's Little Daddy. In addition to her work in Our Gang, Marlowe appeared in fellow Roach stars Laurel and Hardy's first feature film, Pardon Us.

Marlowe's Miss Crabtree character was used in only two more shorts, 1931's Shiver My Timbers and 1932's Readin' and Writin'. After Cooper left Our Gang in 1931, she appeared in MGM features.

== Later years and death ==
In an October 1931 notice, Washington's Evening Star newspaper announced that the Superior Court in Los Angeles "returned a verdict of $100 damages to Henry M. Oviatt against June Marlowe, film actress, and her brother, Armour Marlowe, as the outgrowth of a motor car collision," adding that their automobile had "collided with one containing Oviatt and Mrs. Nellie McLaren, who sued for $5,000 each, alleging injuries", and that "Mrs. McLaren was denied damages."

On July 2, 1933, Marlowe married Hollywood businessman Rodney Sprigg and retired from motion pictures to become a housewife. The couple remained married until Sprigg's death in 1982. In her later years, she suffered from Parkinson's disease, dying from complications on March 10, 1984.

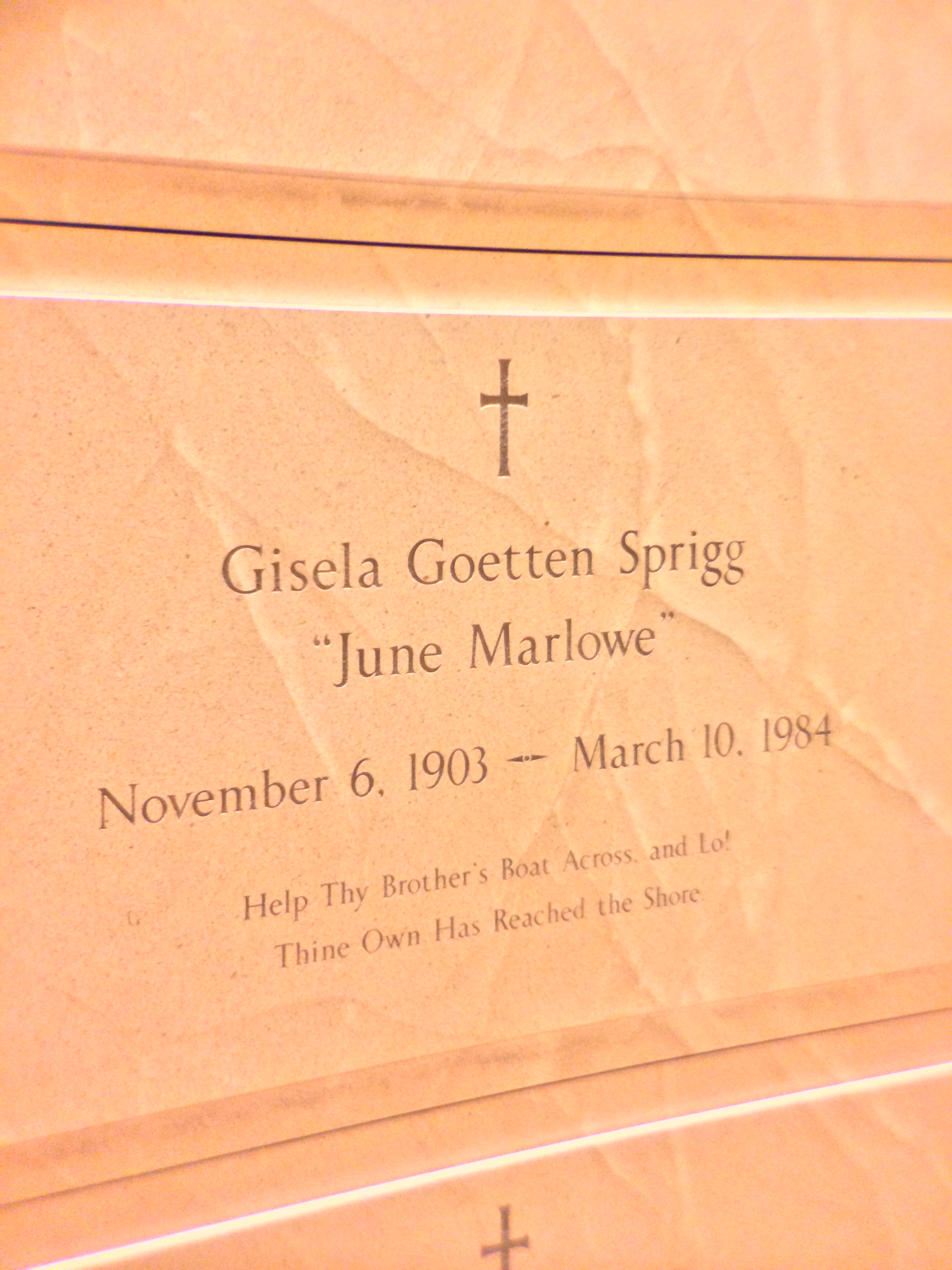
Crypt of June Marlowe at the Los Angeles Cathedral

Marlowe was originally buried at the San Fernando Mission Cemetery. She was later re-interred in the Cathedral of Our Lady of the Angels.

== In popular culture ==
The name of schoolteacher Edna Krabappel, a cartoon character from the animated television series The Simpsons, was chosen by early Simpsons writers Wallace Wolodarsky and Jay Kogen in 1990 as a play on the fruit "crabapple" and as a reference to Miss Crabtree from the Our Gang shorts.

June Marlowe's Our Gang character Miss Crabtree was mentioned in "Buddy", a track on De La Soul's album 3 Feet High and Rising.

== Filmography ==
Short subject
Year	Title	Role	Notes
1924	Killing Time		
1925	Horace Greeley, Jr.		Presumed lost
1930	Fast Work	Herself	
1930	Teacher's Pet	Miss Crabtree	
1930	School's Out	Miss Crabtree	
1931	Love Business	Miss Crabtree	
1931	Little Daddy	Miss Crabtree	
1931	Shiver My Timbers	Miss Crabtree	
1932	Readin' and Writin'	Miss Crabtree	Final appearance

Features
Year	Title	Role	Notes
1923	Fighting Blood	Minor role	Uncredited
1924	When a Man's a Man	Kitty Reid	Incomplete film
1924	The Tenth Woman	Rose Ann Brainherd	Lost film
1924	Find Your Man	Carolina Blair	
1924	A Lost Lady	Constance Ogden	Lost film
1925	The Man Without a Conscience	Ann Sherman	
1925	Tracked in the Snow Country	Joan Hardy	
1925	The Wife Who Wasn't Wanted	Mary Paterson	Lost film
1925	Below the Line	May Barton	
1925	The Clash of the Wolves	May Barstowe	Called Clash of the Wolves on the film
1925	The Pleasure Buyers	Helen Ripley	
1926	The Night Cry	Mrs. John Martin	
1926	Don Juan	Trusia	Uncredited
1926	The Old Soak	Ina Heath	Lost film
1926	Fangs of Justice	Janet Morgan	
1927	The Fourth Commandment	Marjorie Miller	Incomplete film
1927	Alias the Deacon	Phyllis / Mrs. Nancy Blythe	
1927	The Life of Riley	Molly O'Rourke	Lost film; also called Red Hot Riley
1927	Wild Beauty	Helen Cunningham	
1927	On the Stroke of Twelve	Doris Bainbridge	
1928	Their Hour	Peggy	Lost film
1928	Free Lips	Ann Baldridge	
1928	The Branded Man	Louise	
1928	The Foreign Legion	Gabrielle	Lost film
1928	The Grip of the Yukon	Sheila O'Neil	Lost film
1928	Code of the Air	Helen Carson	
1929	The Brandenburg Arch	Frieda, seine Tochter	German title: Durchs Brandenburger Tor. Solang noch Untern Linden...
1929	The Unusual Past of Thea Carter	Thea Carter	German title: Die seltsame Vergangenheit der Thea Carter
1930	The Lone Defender	Dolores Valdez	Serial film; edited into a shorter 1934 film
1931	Los Presidiarios	Warden's daughter	Uncredited
1931	Pardon Us	Warden's daughter	
1932	Devil on Deck	Mary Moore	Lost film
