= List of Warner Bros. films (1918–1929) =

This is a list of films produced, co-produced, and/or distributed by Warner Bros. Pictures, Inc. and also its subsidiary First National Pictures for the years 1918–1929. From 1928 to 1936, films by First National continued to be credited solely to "First National Pictures". This list does not include third-party films or films Warner gained the rights to as a result of mergers or acquisitions.

== Key ==
^{(Lost)}	Considered to be a lost film.

== 1910s ==
=== 1918 ===
Release date	Title	Notes
March 10, 1918	My Four Years in Germany	Warner's first film
December 25, 1918	Kaiser's Finish^{(Lost)}	

=== 1919 ===
Release date	Title	Notes
May 24, 1919	Open Your Eyes	
June 1, 1919	Beware!	
November 30, 1919	Speed^{(Lost)}	Short Subject

== 1920s ==
=== 1920 ===
Release date	Title	Notes
January 1, 1920	The Lost City	Extant In Incomplete Form Only
April 2, 1920	Parted Curtains^{(Lost)}	

=== 1921 ===
Release date	Title	Notes
July 16, 1921	Miracles of the Jungle^{(Lost)}	
August 8, 1921	School Days	Extant at George Eastman House and UCLA with one reel missing Warners' most expensive film to date with a cost of $133,000. Highest-grossing film to date with worldwide rentals of $578,000.
September 4, 1921	Why Girls Leave Home^{(Lost)}	
December 25, 1921	Ashamed of Parents^{(Lost)}	

=== 1922 ===
Release date	Title	Notes
March 26, 1922	Your Best Friend^{(Lost)}	
September 24, 1922	Rags to Riches^{(Lost)}	
November 1, 1922	A Dangerous Adventure^{(Lost)}	Incomplete. Warners' most expensive film to date with a cost of $175,000
December 10, 1922	The Beautiful and Damned^{(Lost)}	
December 24, 1922	Heroes of the Street	

=== 1923 ===
Release date	Title	Notes
March 4, 1923	Brass	
March 15, 1923	The Tie That Binds^{(Lost)}	
March 29, 1923	Little Church Around the Corner^{(Lost)}	
April 25, 1923	Main Street^{(Lost)}	First film to be released after the formal setup of the studio on April 4, 1923
July 1, 1923	Where the North Begins	
August 19, 1923	Little Johnny Jones^{(Lost)}	
August 21, 1923	The Printer's Devil^{(Lost)}	
September 22, 1923	The Gold Diggers	Extant In Incomplete Form; Reels 2, 3 & part of reel 6 remain missing.
November 4, 1923	The Country Kid	
December 8, 1923	Lucretia Lombard	Incomplete (Reel 2 Damaged)
December 9, 1923	Tiger Rose	Abridged/Incomplete; Warners' most expensive film to date with a cost of $436,000

=== 1924 ===
Release date	Title	Notes
January 12, 1924	Conductor 1492	
February 2, 1924	George Washington Jr.^{(Lost)}	
February 9, 1924	Daddies	
February 10, 1924	The Marriage Circle	
March 30, 1924	Beau Brummel	
May 1, 1924	How to Educate a Wife^{(Lost)}	
May 31, 1924	Broadway After Dark^{(Lost)}	Distributed Only
June 15, 1924	Babbitt^{(Lost)}	
July 1, 1924	Being Respectable^{(Lost)}	
July 24, 1924	Her Marriage Vow	Extant at Filmarchiv Austria
August 1, 1924	Cornered^{(Lost)}	
August 10, 1924	Lover's Lane^{(Lost)}	
August 25, 1924	The Tenth Woman^{(Lost)}	
September 1, 1924	Find Your Man	
October 19, 1924	Three Women	
November 1, 1924	The Age of Innocence^{(Lost)}	
November 2, 1924	This Woman	Extant at Lobster Films, Paris
November 16, 1924	The Lover of Camille	Extant at Film Archive Austria, Wien
November 26, 1924	The Dark Swan^{(Lost)}	
December 1, 1924	The Lighthouse by the Sea	Extant with many archival holdings
December 18, 1924	A Lost Lady^{(Lost)}	

=== 1925 ===
Release date	Title	Notes
January 1, 1925	The Bridge of Sighs	Extant at Archives Du Film Du CNC, Bois d'Arcy
January 11, 1925	The Narrow Street^{(Lost)}	Incomplete
March 15, 1925	On Thin Ice^{(Lost)}	
March 29, 1925	A Broadway Butterfly^{(Lost)}	
April 26, 1925	Recompense^{(Lost)}	
May 16, 1925	My Wife and I^{(Lost)}	
June 7, 1925	The Man Without a Conscience	Extant at Danish Film Institute, Copenhagen
July 6, 1925	Eve's Lover^{(Lost)}	
July 13, 1925	Tracked in the Snow Country	Extant at Cinemateket-Svenska Film institutet, Stockholm
July 25, 1925	How Baxter Butted In^{(Lost)}	
August 1, 1925	Kiss Me Again^{(Lost)}	
August 6, 1925	The Woman Hater	Extant at Archives Du Film Du CNC, Bois d'Arcy
September 5, 1925	The Limited Mail	Extant with several archival holdings
September 12, 1925	The Wife Who Wasn't Wanted^{(Lost)}	
September 19, 1925	His Majesty, Bunker Bean	Extant in Incomplete/Abridged Version at UCLA
September 26, 1925	Below the Line	Extant in Incomplete/Abridged Version
October 11, 1925	The Man on the Box	Extant at George Eastman and UCLA Film and Television Archive
October 24, 1925	Compromise^{(Lost)}	
October 25, 1925	Bobbed Hair	Extant at Filmoteca de Catalunya, Barcelona
October 31, 1925	Red Hot Tires	Extant at Library of Congress
November 7, 1925	Seven Sinners	
November 14, 1925	Satan in Sables	Extant at Museum of Modern Art, New York City
November 21, 1925	Rose of the World^{(Lost)}	
November 28, 1925	The Clash of the Wolves	Extant with several archival holdings Inducted into the National Film Registry in 2004
December 5, 1925	Three Weeks in Paris^{(Lost)}	
December 12, 1925	Hogan's Alley	Extant in an Incomplete/Abridged Print
December 19, 1925	The Pleasure Buyers	Extant at Museum of Modern Art, New York City
December 26, 1925	Lady Windermere's Fan	Extant with many archival holdings Inducted into the National Film Registry in 2002

=== 1926 ===
Release date	Title	Notes
January 8, 1926	The Fighting Edge^{(Lost)}	
January 15, 1926	His Jazz Bride^{(Lost)}	
January 15, 1926	The Sea Beast	Extant in many archival copies. Warners' most expensive film to date ($503,000). The highest-grossing film to date with worldwide rentals of $938,000.
January 22, 1926	The Man Upstairs^{(Lost)}	
January 30, 1926	The Golden Cocoon^{(Lost)}	
February 6, 1926	The Caveman	survives fully completed
February 13, 1926	The Love Toy^{(Lost)}	
February 20, 1926	Bride of the Storm^{(Lost)}	
February 27, 1926	The Night Cry	Extant in many archival copies
March 1, 1926	Why Girls Go Back Home^{(Lost)}	
March 6, 1926	The Little Irish Girl	Extant at National Film and Sound Archive in Australia
March 7, 1926	Oh! What a Nurse!	Extant in many archival copies
March 13, 1926	The Gilded Highway^{(Lost)}	
March 17, 1926	Other Women's Husbands^{(Lost)}	
March 20, 1926	The Sap^{(Lost)}	
May 1, 1926	Hell-Bent for Heaven^{(Lost)}	
May 14, 1926	Silken Shackles^{(Lost)}	
May 15, 1926	The Social Highwayman	Extant at Cineteca Italiana, Milan, Italy
June 19, 1926	Footloose Widows	Extant at Library of Congress
July 10, 1926	The Passionate Quest	Extant at Library of Congress and Filmmuseum Nederland (EYE Institut)
July 24, 1926	A Hero of the Big Snows	Extant in many archival copies
July 31, 1926	So This Is Paris	
August 6, 1926	Don Juan	Synchronized sound film Warners' most expensive film to date with a cost of $546,000. The highest-grossing film to date surpassing with worldwide rentals of $1,693,000.
August 14, 1926	Broken Hearts of Hollywood	Extant at Library of Congress & Academy Film Archive (Beverly Hills)
September 2, 1926	The Honeymoon Express^{(Lost)}	
October 1, 1926	Millionaires^{(Lost)}	
October 2, 1926	Across the Pacific^{(Lost)}	
October 16, 1926	My Official Wife^{(Lost)}	
October 23, 1926	The Better 'Ole	Synchronized sound film Extant, several archival copies
October 30, 1926	Private Izzy Murphy^{(Lost)}	
November 27, 1926	While London Sleeps^{(Lost)}	
December 1, 1926	The Third Degree	Extant at Library of Congress & Wisconsin Center For Film and Theater Research

=== 1927 ===
Release date	Title	Notes
January 8, 1927	Finger Prints^{(Lost)}	
January 15, 1927	Wolf's Clothing^{(Lost)}	
January 18, 1927	The Fortune Hunter^{(Lost)}	Synchronized sound film
January 22, 1927	Don't Tell the Wife^{(Lost)}	
February 19, 1927	Hills of Kentucky	Extant In Incomplete Kodascope Copy
February 26, 1927	The Gay Old Bird^{(Lost)}	
March 19, 1927	White Flannels^{(Lost)}	
March 20, 1927	What Every Girl Should Know^{(Lost)}	
April 9, 1927	Matinee Ladies^{(Lost)}	
April 23, 1927	Bitter Apples^{(Lost)}	Synchronized sound film
April 30, 1927	The Brute^{(Lost)}	
May 7, 1927	Tracked by the Police	Extant at Library of Congress and the George Eastman House
May 14, 1927	The Climbers^{(Lost)}	
May 21, 1927	Irish Hearts^{(Lost)}	
May 22, 1927	The Missing Link	Synchronized sound film Extant in several archival copies
May 28, 1927	A Million Bid	Extant at Library of Congress (incomplete)
June 1, 1927	Simple Sis^{(Lost)}	
June 4, 1927	The Black Diamond Express^{(Lost)}	
June 18, 1927	Dearie^{(Lost)}	
June 25, 1927	What Happened to Father?^{(Lost)}	
July 23, 1927	The Heart of Maryland^{(Lost)}	Incomplete
August 20, 1927	The Bush Leaguer^{(Lost)}	Synchronized sound film
August 21, 1927	When a Man Loves	Synchronized sound film Extant at George Eastman House & Filmoteca Española (Madrid)
August 27, 1927	The Desired Woman^{(Lost)}	
September 3, 1927	Slightly Used^{(Lost)}	Synchronized sound film
September 4, 1927	Old San Francisco	Synchronized sound film Extant at George Eastman House & Library of Congress
September 10, 1927	Jaws of Steel	Synchronized sound film Extant at Filmmuseum Nederlands (EYE Institute)
September 17, 1927	One-Round Hogan^{(Lost)}	Synchronized sound film
September 18, 1927	The First Auto	Synchronized sound film Extant at Library of Congress
September 24, 1927	A Sailor's Sweetheart	Synchronized sound film Extant at BFI National Film and Television
October 6, 1927	The Jazz Singer	First Part-talkie sound feature film Extant in many archival copies Warners' highest-grossing film to date with worldwide rentals of $2,625,000; Inducted into the National Film Registry in 1996
October 8, 1927	Sailor Izzy Murphy^{(Lost)}	Synchronized sound film
October 15, 1927	The College Widow^{(Lost)}	
October 22, 1927	A Reno Divorce^{(Lost)}	Synchronized sound film
October 29, 1927	A Dog of the Regiment^{(Lost)}	Synchronized sound film
November 5, 1927	Good Time Charley	Synchronized sound film
November 12, 1927	The Silver Slave^{(Lost)}	Synchronized sound film
November 19, 1927	The Girl from Chicago^{(Lost)}	Synchronized sound film
November 26, 1927	Ginsberg the Great^{(Lost)}	Synchronized sound film
December 3, 1927	Brass Knuckles	Synchronized sound film Extant at Cineteca Nazionale, Rome
December 17, 1927	If I Were Single	Synchronized sound film Extant at BFI National Film and Television Archive
December 24, 1927	Ham and Eggs at the Front	Synchronized sound film
December 31, 1927	Husbands for Rent^{(Lost)}	Synchronized sound film

=== 1928 ===
Release date	Title	Notes
January 14, 1928	Beware of Married Men^{(Lost)}	Synchronized sound film Incomplete fragment of one reel survives at UCLA
January 28, 1928	A Race for Life	Synchronized sound film
February 11, 1928	The Little Snob^{(Lost)}	Synchronized sound film
February 25, 1928	Across the Atlantic^{(Lost)}	Synchronized sound film
March 10, 1928	Powder My Back^{(Lost)}	Synchronized sound film
March 14, 1928	Tenderloin^{(Lost)}	Part-Talkie sound film
March 28, 1928	Domestic Troubles^{(Lost)}	Synchronized sound film
April 7, 1928	The Crimson City	Synchronized sound film
April 21, 1928	Rinty of the Desert^{(Lost)}	Synchronized sound film
April 26, 1928	Glorious Betsy	Part-Talkie sound film
May 12, 1928	Pay as You Enter^{(Lost)}	Synchronized sound film
May 21, 1928	The Lion and the Mouse	Part-Talkie sound film
May 26, 1928	Five and Ten Cent Annie	Part-Talkie sound film A fragment is extant at BFI
July 18, 1928	Lights of New York	First All-Talking sound feature film
August 11, 1928	Women They Talk About^{(Lost)}	Part-Talkie sound film
August 25, 1928	Caught in the Fog	Part-Talkie sound film Extant at BFI
August 25, 1928	State Street Sadie^{(Lost)}	Part-Talkie sound film
September 1, 1928	The Midnight Taxi	Part-Talkie sound film Extant at BFI
September 6, 1928	The Terror^{(Lost)}	All-Talking sound film
September 9, 1928	Night Watch	distribution only; produced by First National Pictures; Synchronized sound film First National became a subsidiary of Warner Bros. from this point.
September 16, 1928	Waterfront	distribution only; produced by First National Pictures; Synchronized sound film
September 16, 1928	The Whip	distribution only; produced by First National Pictures; Synchronized sound film
September 19, 1928	The Singing Fool	Part-Talkie sound film Warners' highest-grossing film to date ($5,916,000)
September 23, 1928	Show Girl	distribution only; produced by First National Pictures; Synchronized sound film
October 7, 1928	The Crash	distribution only; produced by First National Pictures; Synchronized sound film
October 14, 1928	Do Your Duty^{(Lost)}	distribution only; First National Pictures
October 18, 1928	Land of the Silver Fox	Part-Talkie sound film Extant at George Eastman
October 18, 1928	Lilac Time	distribution only; produced by First National Pictures; Synchronized sound film
October 21, 1928	Companionate Marriage^{(Lost)}	distribution only; produced by First National Pictures
October 27, 1928	Beware of Bachelors	Part-Talkie sound film Extant at the Library of Congress
September 9, 1928	The Glorious Trail^{(Lost)}	distribution only; produced by First National Pictures
November 1, 1928	Noah's Ark	Part-Talkie sound film Warners' first film to cost over $1 million.
November 3, 1928	The Home Towners^{(Lost)}	All-Talking sound film
November 4, 1928	The Haunted House	distribution only; produced by First National Pictures; Synchronized sound film Unclear Status
November 11, 1928	Outcast	distribution only; produced by First National Pictures; Synchronized sound film
December 1, 1928	On Trial^{(Lost)}	All-Talking sound film
December 2, 1928	Adoration	distribution only; produced by First National Pictures; Synchronized sound film
December 8, 1928	The Little Wildcat^{(Lost)}	Part-Talkie sound film
December 9, 1928	The Barker	distribution only; produced by First National Pictures; Part-Talkie sound film Extant at Museum of Modern Art
December 15, 1928	My Man^{(Lost)}	Part-Talkie sound film
December 16, 1928	Night Watch	distribution only; produced by First National Pictures; Synchronized sound film
December 22, 1928	Conquest^{(Lost)}	All-Talking sound film
December 23, 1928	The Phantom City^{(Lost)}	distribution only; produced by First National Pictures
December 26, 1928	The Ware Case	distribution only; produced by First National Pictures; Produced in the United Kingdom
December 29, 1928	Scarlet Seas	distribution only; produced by First National Pictures; Synchronized sound film

=== 1929 ===
Release date	Title	Notes
January 6, 1929	Synthetic Sin	distribution only; produced by First National Pictures; Synchronized sound film
January 12, 1929	Cheyenne^{(Lost)}	distribution only; produced by First National Pictures; Synchronized sound film
January 26, 1929	Fancy Baggage^{(Lost)}	Part-Talkie sound film
January 27, 1929	Seven Footprints to Satan	distribution only; produced by First National Pictures; Synchronized sound film
February 2, 1929	Stark Mad^{(Lost)}	All-Talking sound film
February 3, 1929	His Captive Woman	distribution only; produced by First National Pictures; Part-Talkie sound film
February 9, 1929	The Greyhound Limited	Part-Talkie sound film
February 9, 1929	The Million Dollar Collar^{(Lost)}	Part-Talkie sound film
February 10, 1929	Weary River	distribution only; produced by First National Pictures; Part-Talkie sound film
February 16, 1929	The Redeeming Sin^{(Lost)}	Part-Talkie sound film
February 17, 1929	The Lawless Legion^{(Lost)}	distribution only; produced by First National Pictures; Synchronized sound film
February 17, 1929	The Royal Rider^{(Lost)}	distribution only; produced by First National Pictures; Synchronized sound film
February 23, 1929	Stolen Kisses^{(Lost)}	Part-Talkie sound film
February 28, 1929	Why Be Good?	distribution only; produced by First National Pictures; Synchronized sound film
March 3, 1929	Children of the Ritz^{(Lost)}	distribution only; produced by First National Pictures; Synchronized sound film
March 10, 1929	Saturday's Children^{(Lost)}	distribution only; produced by First National Pictures; Part-Talkie sound film
March 16, 1929	One Stolen Night^{(Lost)}	Part-Talkie sound film
March 23, 1929	Kid Gloves	Part-Talkie sound film Extant at GEH
March 24, 1929	Queen of the Night Clubs^{(Lost)}	All-Talking sound film
March 24, 1929	Love and the Devil	distribution only; produced by First National Pictures; Synchronized sound film
March 30, 1929	Hardboiled Rose^{(Lost)}	Part-Talkie sound film
March 31, 1929	The Divine Lady	distribution only; produced by First National Pictures; Synchronized sound film
April 6, 1929	No Defense^{(Lost)}	Part-Talkie sound film
April 8, 1929	The Desert Song	All-Talking sound film Technicolor sequences Warner's first feature with color sequences.
April 18, 1929	Sonny Boy^{(Lost)}	Part-Talkie sound film
April 20, 1929	Frozen River^{(Lost)}	Part-Talkie sound film
April 27, 1929	From Headquarters	Part-Talkie sound film
April 28, 1929	The House of Horror^{(Lost)}	distribution only; produced by First National Pictures; Part-Talkie sound film
May 4, 1929	Glad Rag Doll^{(Lost)}	Part-Talkie sound film
May 5, 1929	Hot Stuff^{(Lost)}	distribution only; produced by First National Pictures; Part-Talkie sound film
May 9, 1929	The Squall	distribution only; produced by First National Pictures; All-Talking sound film
May 12, 1929	Two Weeks Off	distribution only; produced by First National Pictures; Part-Talkie sound film
May 19, 1929	Prisoners^{(Lost)}	distribution only; produced by First National Pictures; Part-Talkie sound film
May 23, 1929	The Flying Scotsman	Part-Talkie sound film Produced by British International Pictures and WB British
June 2, 1929	Careers	distribution only; produced by First National Pictures; All-Talking sound film
June 22, 1929	Madonna of Avenue A^{(Lost)}	Part-Talkie sound film
June 23, 1929	The Girl in the Glass Cage^{(Lost)}	distribution only; produced by First National Pictures; Part-Talkie sound film
June 29, 1929	The Gamblers^{(Lost)}	All-Talking sound film
June 30, 1929	Broadway Babies	distribution only; produced by First National Pictures; All-Talking sound film
July 7, 1929	The Man and the Moment	distribution only; produced by First National Pictures; Part-Talkie sound film
July 8, 1929	The Time, the Place and the Girl^{(Lost)}	All-Talking sound film
July 13, 1929	On with the Show!	All-Talking sound film All Technicolor; Warner's first all-color feature film
July 14, 1929	Twin Beds^{(Lost)}	distribution only; produced by First National Pictures; All-Talking sound film
July 21, 1929	Drag	distribution only; produced by First National Pictures; All-Talking sound film
July 28, 1929	Smiling Irish Eyes^{(Lost)}	distribution only; produced by First National Pictures; All-Talking sound film Technicolor Sequences
August 4, 1929	Hard to Get^{(Lost)}	distribution only; produced by First National Pictures; All-Talking sound film
August 7, 1929	The California Mail^{(Lost)}	distribution only; produced by First National Pictures; Synchronized sound film
August 10, 1929	The Hottentot^{(Lost)}	All-Talking sound film
August 11, 1929	Dark Streets^{(Lost)}	distribution only; produced by First National Pictures; All-Talking sound film
August 17, 1929	The Argyle Case^{(Lost)}	All-Talking sound film
August 24, 1929	Say It with Songs	All-Talking sound film
August 25, 1929	Her Private Life	distribution only; produced by First National Pictures; All-Talking sound film
August 30, 1929	Gold Diggers of Broadway^{(Lost)}	All-Talking sound film All Technicolor; Incomplete; Reels Nine And Ten Extant.
August 31, 1929	Honky Tonk^{(Lost)}	All-Talking sound film
August 31, 1929	In the Headlines^{(Lost)}	All-Talking sound film
September 1, 1929	Fast Life^{(Lost)}	distribution only; produced by First National Pictures; All-Talking sound film
September 7, 1929	Skin Deep^{(Lost)}	All-Talking sound film
September 14, 1929	Hearts in Exile^{(Lost)}	All-Talking sound film
September 15, 1929	The Careless Age^{(Lost)}	distribution only; produced by First National Pictures; All-Talking sound film
September 15, 1929	The Great Divide	distribution only; produced by First National Pictures; All-Talking sound film
September 22, 1929	A Most Immoral Lady^{(Lost)}	distribution only; produced by First National Pictures; All-Talking sound film
October 16, 1929	The Isle of Lost Ships	distribution only; produced by First National Pictures; All-Talking sound film
October 17, 1929	So Long Letty	All-Talking sound film
October 19, 1929	Is Everybody Happy?^{(Lost)}	All-Talking sound film
October 20, 1929	Young Nowheres^{(Lost)}	distribution only; produced by First National Pictures; All-Talking sound film
October 27, 1929	The Girl from Woolworth's^{(Lost)}	distribution only; produced by First National Pictures; All-Talking sound film
November 1, 1929	Disraeli	All-Talking sound film Academy Award nominee for Best Picture
November 7, 1929	Paris^{(Lost)}	distribution only; produced by First National Pictures; All-Talking sound film Technicolor Sequences
November 8, 1929	Footlights and Fools^{(Lost)}	distribution only; produced by First National Pictures; All-Talking sound film Technicolor Sequences
November 9, 1929	The Sap^{(Lost)}	All-Talking sound film
November 10, 1929	The Forward Pass^{(Lost)}	distribution only; produced by First National Pictures; All-Talking sound film
November 17, 1929	Little Johnny Jones^{(Lost)}	distribution only; produced by First National Pictures; All-Talking sound film
November 24, 1929	The Sacred Flame^{(Lost)}	All-Talking sound film
December 1, 1929	The Painted Angel^{(Lost)}	distribution only; produced by First National Pictures; All-Talking sound film
December 3, 1929	General Crack	All-Talking sound film Technicolor Sequences; Extant except for color sequences.
December 5, 1929	Evidence^{(Lost)}	All-Talking sound film
December 8, 1929	The Love Racket^{(Lost)}	distribution only; produced by First National Pictures; All-Talking sound film
December 14, 1929	The Aviator^{(Lost)}	All-Talking sound film
December 21, 1929	Tiger Rose	All-Talking sound film
December 23, 1929	Sally	distribution only; produced by First National Pictures; All-Talking sound film All Technicolor
December 29, 1929	Wedding Rings^{(Lost)}	distribution only; produced by First National Pictures; All-Talking sound film
December 29, 1929	The Show of Shows	All-Talking sound film Part Technicolor

== See also ==
- List of New Line Cinema films
- List of films based on DC Comics publications
- List of Warner Bros. theatrical animated feature films
- Category:Lists of films by studio
