= List of early Warner Bros. sound and talking features =

This is a list of early pre-recorded sound and/or talking movies produced, co-produced, and/or distributed by Warner Bros. and its subsidiary First National (FN) for the years 1927–1931.

== Synchronized sound films ==
Synchronized musical score with sound effects

Release date	Title	Notes
August 6, 1926	Don Juan	Extant; First Vitaphone feature.
October 6, 1926	The Better 'Ole	Extant
January 18, 1927	The Fortune Hunter	Lost film
May 22, 1927	The Missing Link	Synchronized score Extant; Held at Gosfilmofond, LoC, Cineteca Nazionale, BFI
August 20, 1927	The Bush Leaguer	Lost film
August 21, 1927	When a Man Loves	Extant
August 27, 1927	The Desired Woman	Lost film
September 3, 1927	Slightly Used	Lost film
September 4, 1927	Old San Francisco	Extant
September 10, 1927	Jaws of Steel (Note: Some films from the Warner Archive Collection has not been announced on DVD.)	Incomplete
September 17, 1927	One Round Hogan	Lost film
September 18, 1927	The First Auto	Lost film
September 24, 1927	A Sailor's Sweetheart	Incomplete
October 8, 1927	Sailor Izzy Murphy	Lost film
October 22, 1927	A Reno Divorce	Lost film
October 29, 1927	A Dog of the Regiment	Lost film
November 5, 1927	Good Time Charley	Extant
November 12, 1927	The Silver Slave	Lost film
November 19, 1927	The Girl from Chicago	Lost film
November 26, 1927	Ginsberg the Great	Lost film
December 3, 1927	Brass Knuckles	Extant
December 17, 1927	If I Were Single	Extant
December 24, 1927	Ham and Eggs at the Front	Extant
December 31, 1927	Husbands for Rent	Lost film
January 14, 1928	Beware of Married Men	Incomplete (one reel extant)
January 28, 1928	A Race for Life	Extant
February 11, 1928	The Little Snob	Incomplete
February 25, 1928	Across the Atlantic	Lost film
March 10, 1928	Powder My Back	Lost film
March 28, 1928	Domestic Troubles	Lost film
April 1, 1928	Ladies' Night in a Turkish Bath (FN)	Extant
April 7, 1928	The Crimson City	Extant
April 21, 1928	Rinty of the Desert	Lost film
May 12, 1928	Pay as You Enter	Lost film
September 9, 1928	Night Watch (FN)	Extant
September 16, 1928	The Whip (FN)	Extant
September 16, 1928	Waterfront (FN)	Extant
September 28, 1928	Show Girl (FN)	Extant
October 7, 1928	The Crash (FN)	Lost film
October 18, 1928	Lilac Time (FN)	Extant
November 4, 1928	The Haunted House (FN)	Lost film
November 11, 1928	Outcast (FN)	Extant
November 18, 1928	The Good-Bye Kiss (FN)	Lost film
December 2, 1928	Adoration (FN)	Extant
December 16, 1928	Naughty Baby (FN)	Extant
December 30, 1928	Scarlet Seas (FN)	Extant
January 9, 1929	Synthetic Sin (FN)	Extant
January 27, 1929	Seven Footprints to Satan (FN)	International Sound Version extant
February 3, 1928	Cheyenne (FN)	Lost film
February 17, 1928	The Royal Rider (FN)	Lost film
February 17, 1928	The Lawless Legion (FN)	Lost film
February 28, 1929	Why Be Good? (FN)	Extant
March 3, 1929	Children of the Ritz (FN)	Incomplete
March 24, 1929	Love and the Devil (FN)	Extant
March 31, 1929	The Divine Lady (FN)	Extant

== Part-talkies ==
The following films partially contain dialogue and are classified as part-talkies.

Title	Release date	Notes
The Jazz Singer	October 6, 1927	Extant at WCFTR, LoC and BFI; First Warner feature with dialogue
Tenderloin	March 14, 1928	Lost film
Glorious Betsy	April 26, 1928	Extant at LoC and WCFTR; Incomplete soundtrack
Five and Ten Cent Annie	May 28, 1928	Incomplete
The Lion and the Mouse	June 15, 1928	Extant at UCLA, LoC & WCFTR; Incomplete soundtrack
State Street Sadie	September 2, 1928	Lost film
The Singing Fool	September 19, 1928	Extant
Women They Talk About	October 14, 1928	Lost film
Land of the Silver Fox	October 18, 1928	Extant
Beware of Bachelors	October 27, 1928	Extant
The Midnight Taxi	October 28, 1928	Sound version lost Silent version extant
Noah's Ark	November 1, 1928	Extant
Caught in the Fog	December 2, 1928	Incomplete
The Little Wildcat	December 8, 1928	Lost film
The Barker (FN)	December 9, 1928	Extant
My Man	December 21, 1928	Lost film Soundtrack extant
The Greyhound Limited	February 9, 1929	Extant.
Million Dollar Collar	February 9, 1929	Lost film
Weary River (FN)	February 10, 1929	Extant
Fancy Baggage	February 23, 1929	Lost film
Stolen Kisses	February 23, 1929	Lost film
Sonny Boy	February 27, 1929	Extant
Hardboiled Rose	March 30, 1929	Extant
The Redeeming Sin	April 6, 1929	Lost film
His Captive Woman (FN)	April 7, 1929	Extant
Hot Stuff (FN)	April 7, 1929	Lost film
Saturday's Children (FN)	April 14, 1929	Lost film.
One Stolen Night	April 20, 1929	Lost film
Kid Gloves	April 27, 1929	Extant at GEH
House of Horror (FN)	April 28, 1929	Lost film
Glad Rag Doll	May 4, 1929	Lost film
No Defense	May 11, 1929	Lost film
Two Weeks Off (FN)	May 12, 1929	Extant
Prisoners (FN)	May 19, 1929	Lost film
Frozen River	May 25, 1929	Lost film
From Headquarters	June 6, 1929	Lost film
The Girl in the Glass Cage (FN)	June 23, 1929	Lost film
The Man and the Moment (FN)	July 7, 1929	Extant
Madonna of Avenue A	July 22, 1929	Lost film

== All-talkies ==
The following films contain dialogue and are classified as all-talkies.

Title	Release date	Notes
Lights of New York	July 8, 1928	Warner's first all-talking feature
The Terror	August 15, 1928	Lost film Soundtrack extant
The Home Towners	October 23, 1928	Lost film
On Trial	November 14, 1928	Lost film
Conquest	December 22, 1928	Lost film
Stark Mad	March 2, 1929	Lost film
Queen of the Night Clubs	March 24, 1929	Lost film
The Desert Song	April 8, 1929	Technicolor sequences Extant
The Squall (FN)	May 26, 1929	Extant
On with the Show!	May 28, 1929	All Technicolor; Extant in black and white
Careers (FN)	June 2, 1929	Extant
The Gamblers	June 29, 1929	Lost film
Broadway Babies (FN)	June 30, 1929	Extant
The Time, the Place and the Girl	July 8, 1929	Lost film
Twin Beds (FN)	July 14, 1929	Lost film
Drag (FN)	July 21, 1929	Extant
Smiling Irish Eyes (FN)	July 28, 1929	Technicolor sequences Lost film
Hard To Get (FN)	August 4, 1929	Lost film
Say It with Songs	August 6, 1929	Extant
Dark Streets (FN)	August 11, 1929	Lost film
The Careless Age (FN)	August 18, 1929	Lost film
Her Private Life (FN)	August 25, 1929	Extant at Cineteca Italiana.
Gold Diggers of Broadway	August 29, 1929	All Technicolor; Incomplete
Fast Life (FN)	September 1, 1929	Lost film
Hearts in Exile	September 14, 1929	Lost film
The Great Divide (FN)	September 15, 1929	Extant
Honky Tonk	September 21, 1929	Lost film
A Most Immoral Lady (FN)	September 22, 1929	Lost film
The Hottentot	September 28, 1929	Lost film
The Isle Of Lost Ships (FN)	September 29, 1929	Extant
The Argyle Case	October 5, 1929	Lost film
Evidence	October 5, 1929	Lost film
So Long Letty	October 16, 1929	Extant
Is Everybody Happy?	October 19, 1929	Lost film
Young Nowheres (FN)	October 20, 1929	Lost film
In the Headlines	October 26, 1929	Lost film
The Girl From Woolworths (FN)	October 27, 1929	Lost film
Disraeli	November 1, 1929	Extant; Nominee for the Academy Award for Best Picture
Skin Deep	November 2, 1929	Lost film
Paris (FN)	November 7, 1929	Part Technicolor; Incomplete; American sound exists only for reel 6,7, and 8, European sound exists.
Footlights And Fools (FN)	November 8, 1929	Part Technicolor; Lost film
The Sap	November 9, 1929	Lost film
The Forward Pass (FN)	November 10, 1929	Lost film
Little Johnny Jones (FN)	November 17, 1929	Lost film
The Show of Shows	November 21, 1929	Part Technicolor; Extant in black and white
The Royal Box	November 21, 1929	Lost film First all-talking German-language film made in America
The Sacred Flame	November 24, 1929	Lost film
The Painted Angel (FN)	December 1, 1929	Lost film
General Crack	December 3, 1929	Part Technicolor; Silent version extant
The Love Racket (FN)	December 8, 1929	Lost film
The Aviator	December 14, 1929	Lost film
Tiger Rose	December 21, 1929	Extant
Sally (FN)	December 23, 1929	All Technicolor; Extant in black and white
Wedding Rings (FN)	December 29, 1929	Lost film

== Films released in 1930 and after are all-talking ==
No further synchronized films or part-talkies were made or released from this point.

Title	Release date	Notes
Second Choice	January 4, 1930	Lost film
Lilies of the Field (FN)	January 5, 1930	Incomplete
Playing Around (FN)	January 19, 1930	On DVD
In the Next Room (FN)	January 26, 1930	Lost film
Wide Open	February 1, 1930	On DVD
Loose Ankles (FN)	February 2, 1930	On DVD
The Other Tomorrow (FN)	February 9, 1930	Lost film
The Green Goddess	February 13, 1930	On DVD
She Couldn't Say No	February 15, 1930	Lost film
No, No, Nanette (FN)	February 16, 1930	Part Technicolor; 160 ft fragment extant at BFI; American soundtrack lost
Demon of the Sea	March 1930	Lost film
Isle of Escape	March 1, 1930	Lost film
Strictly Modern (FN)	March 2, 1930	Lost film
Son of the Gods (FN)	March 9, 1930	Part Technicolor; Extant in black and white On DVD
Song of the West	March 15, 1930	All Technicolor; Lost film
On the Border	March 15, 1930	
The Furies (FN)	March 16, 1930	Lost film
Hold Everything	March 20, 1930	All Technicolor; Lost film Soundtrack extant
Mammy	March 26, 1930	Technicolor sequences Incomplete; On DVD
The Man from Blankley's	March 28, 1930	Lost film
Under a Texas Moon	April 1, 1930	All Technicolor; Extant at UCLA
Murder Will Out (FN)	April 6, 1930	Lost film
Spring is Here (FN)	April 13, 1930	
Those Who Dance	April 19, 1930	
Show Girl in Hollywood (FN)	April 20, 1930	Part Technicolor; Extant in black and white On DVD
The Second Floor Mystery	April 26, 1930	
A Notorious Affair (FN)	May 4, 1930	On DVD
The Man Hunter	May 5, 1930	Lost film
Dumbbells in Ermine	May 10, 1930	Lost film
The Flirting Widow (FN)	May 11, 1930	
The Bride of the Regiment (FN)	May 21, 1930	All Technicolor; Lost film
Courage	May 22, 1930	Lost film
Song of the Flame (FN)	May 25, 1930	All Technicolor; Vitascope; Lost film
Back Pay (FN)	June 1, 1930	On DVD
Rough Waters	June 7, 1930	Lost film
Golden Dawn	June 14, 1930	All Technicolor; Extant in black and white
Sweethearts and Wives (FN)	June 15, 1930	
Sweet Mama (FN)	July 6, 1930	
Recaptured Love	July 8, 1930	
The Dawn Patrol (FN)	July 10, 1930	On DVD
Dancing Sweeties	July 19, 1930	On DVD
Road to Paradise (FN)	July 20, 1930	On DVD
Three Faces East	July 26, 1930	On DVD
The Matrimonial Bed	August 2, 1930	On DVD
Sweet Kitty Bellairs	August 9, 1930	All Technicolor; Extant in black and white On DVD
Numbered Men (FN)	August 6, 1930	
Moby Dick	August 14, 1930	On DVD
Oh Sailor Behave	August 16, 1930	On DVD
The Office Wife	August 23, 1930	On DVD
Top Speed (FN)	August 24, 1930	Incomplete
Big Boy	September 6, 1930	Incomplete; On DVD
The Way of All Men (FN)	September 7, 1930	Lost film
The Bad Man (FN)	September 15, 1930	Unpreserved nitrate print at UCLA; In danger of being lost
Bright Lights (FN)	September 21, 1930	All Technicolor; Extant in black and white Color fragments at LOC; On DVD
Old English	September 27, 1930	On DVD
Scarlet Pages (FN)	September 28, 1930	On DVD
Maybe It's Love	October 4, 1930	On DVD
College Lovers (FN)	October 5, 1930	Lost film
Sinner's Holiday	October 11, 1930	On DVD
The Girl of the Golden West (FN)	October 12, 1930	Lost film
The Doorway to Hell	October 18, 1930	On DVD
The Life of the Party	October 25, 1930	All Technicolor; Extant in black and white
Kismet (FN)	October 30, 1930	Vitascope; Lost film
A Soldier's Plaything	November 1, 1930	Vitascope; Incomplete; On DVD
River's End	November 1, 1930	
The Gorilla (FN)	November 2, 1930	Lost film
The Truth About Youth (FN)	November 3, 1930	
Sunny (FN)	November 9, 1930	On DVD
The Widow from Chicago (FN)	November 23, 1930	On DVD
Viennese Nights	November 26, 1930	All Technicolor; Extant; Color print at UCLA
Outward Bound	November 29, 1930	
One Night at Susie's (FN)	November 30, 1930	On DVD
Man to Man	December 6, 1930	
Mother's Cry (FN)	December 7, 1930	
Divorce Among Friends	December 13, 1930	
The Lash (FN)	December 14, 1930	Vitascope; On DVD
Captain Thunder	December 27, 1930	On DVD
Other Men's Women	January 17, 1931	On DVD
Captain Applejack	January 31, 1931	
Illicit	February 14, 1931	On DVD
Sit Tight	February 28, 1931	Incomplete; On DVD
Fifty Million Frenchmen	March 21, 1931	All Technicolor; Extant in black and white
God's Gift to Women	April 25, 1931	Incomplete; On DVD
Svengali	April 29, 1931	On DVD
The Millionaire	May 15, 1931	
The Public Enemy	May 22, 1931	On DVD
The Maltese Falcon	June 13, 1931	On DVD
Gold Dust Gertie	June 27, 1931	Incomplete; On DVD
Smart Money	July 11, 1931	On DVD
Children of Dreams	July 25, 1931	Part Technicolor; Lost film
Night Nurse	August 8, 1931	On DVD
Bought!	August 8, 1931	
The Star Witness	August 21, 1931	
Alexander Hamilton	September 12, 1931	On DVD
Side Show	September 19, 1931	Incomplete; On DVD
The Road to Singapore	October 10, 1931	On DVD
Expensive Women	October 24, 1931	
The Mad Genius	November 7, 1931	On DVD
Blonde Crazy	November 14, 1931	On DVD
The Naughty Flirt (FN)	January 11, 1931	On DVD
Little Caesar (FN)	January 25, 1931	On DVD
Going Wild (FN)	February 2, 1931	On DVD
The Right of Way (FN)	February 7, 1931	On DVD
Kiss Me Again (FN)	February 21, 1931	All Technicolor; Extant in black and white
Father's Son (FN)	March 7, 1931	Lost film Soundtrack survives
The Hot Heiress (FN)	March 28, 1931	On DVD
Woman Hungry (FN)	April 4, 1931	All Technicolor; Lost film
The Finger Points (FN)	April 11, 1931	On DVD
Misbehaving Ladies (FN)	April 18, 1931	
Too Young to Marry (FN)	May 8, 1931	Incomplete
The Lady Who Dared (FN)	May 29, 1931	
Party Husband (FN)	June 6, 1931	On DVD
Men of the Sky (FN)	June 20, 1931	Lost film
Big Business Girl (FN)	July 4, 1931	On DVD
Chances (FN)	July 18, 1931	On DVD
Broadminded (FN)	August 1, 1931	On DVD
The Reckless Hour (FN)	August 15, 1931	On DVD
The Last Flight (FN)	August 29, 1931	On DVD
The Bargain (FN)	September 5, 1931	Lost film
I Like Your Nerve (FN)	September 12, 1931	On DVD
Five Star Final (FN)	September 26, 1931	On DVD
Penrod and Sam (FN)	October 3, 1931	On DVD
Honor of the Family (FN)	October 17, 1931	Lost film
The Ruling Voice (FN)	October 31, 1931	
Local Boy Makes Good (FN)	November 28, 1931	On DVD
Compromised (FN)	December 5, 1931	Lost film
Safe in Hell (FN)	December 12, 1931	On DVD
Her Majesty, Love (FN)	December 26, 1931	On DVD

== See also ==
- List of early color feature films
- List of early sound feature films (1926–1929)
- List of lost films
- List of incomplete or partially lost films
- Vitaphone Varieties
