= Audrey Ferris =

American actress (1909–1990)

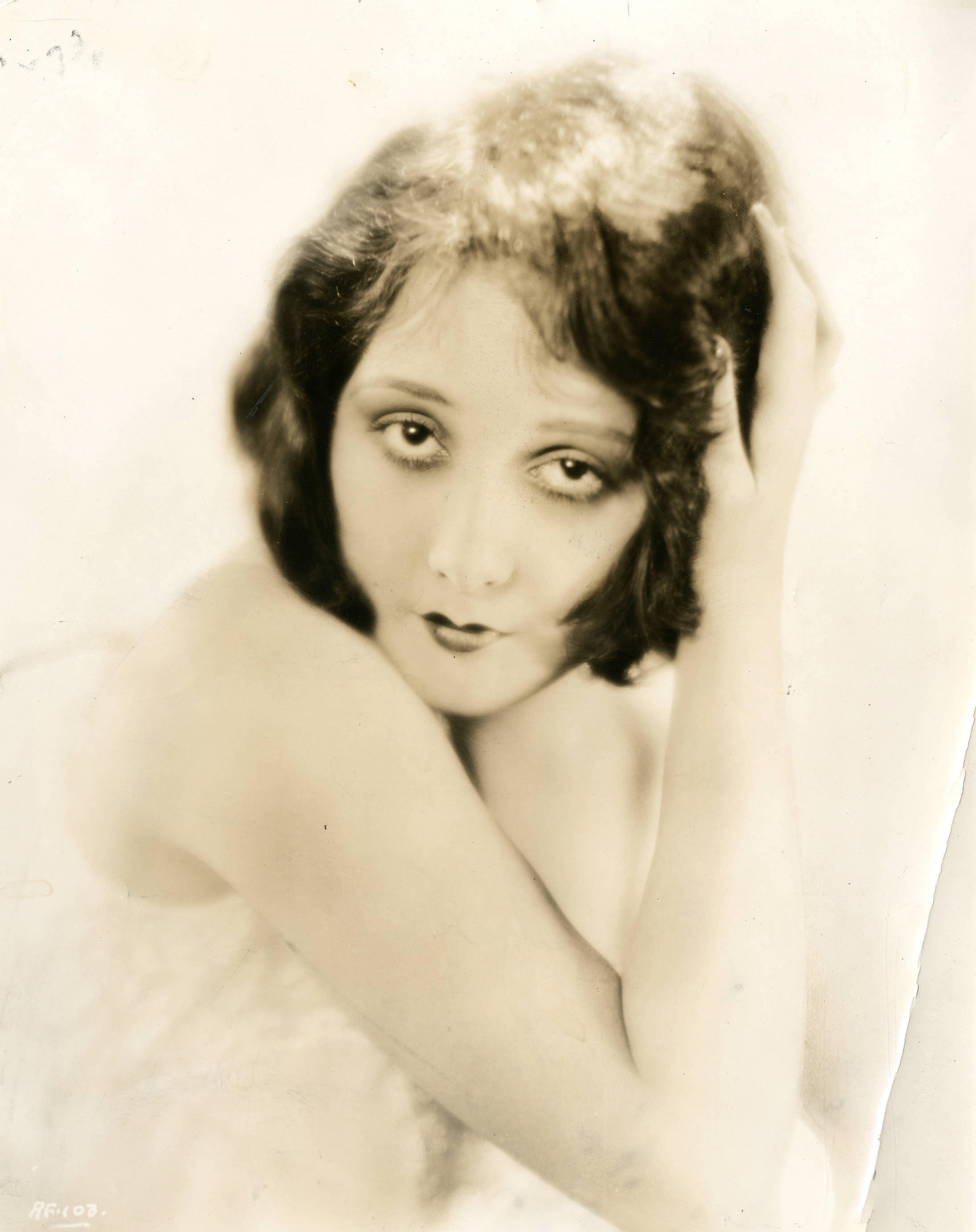
- Ferris in 1928
- Born: Audrey Minerva Kellar; August 30, 1909; Detroit, Michigan, U.S.
- Died: May 3, 1990 (aged 80); Los Angeles, California, U.S.
- Occupations: Actress; singer; dancer
- Years active: 1927–1935
- Spouse: Archer Huntington

Audrey Minerva Ferris (née Kellar; August 30, 1909 – May 3, 1990) was an American film actress of the silent film era of the late 1920s and into the early 1930s, a singer, and a dancer.

== Biography ==
Born Audrey Minerva Kellar in Detroit, Michigan, Ferris was the only child to Frank M. Kellar, a railway clerk, and Florence Maggie Kellar (née Watson), who were both Canadian immigrants. Ferris was of English, Irish, and German descent. Her parents divorced in 1913. In May 1935, Ferris was a witness in a trial in Los Angeles as her mother sued for more than $3,000 in past-due support payments. Ferris, then 25 years old, testified that she did not remember her father. Her mother remarried in November 1917 to a salesman named David Hamlin Ferris, who adopted Audrey. Ferris and her family moved to Los Angeles in the 1910s, and she attended Los Angeles High School, where she participated in orchestra class as a violinist and was concertmistress.

While living in Los Angeles, she began working to pursue a career as an actress. In 1927 she received her first supporting role in Woman's Law, which starred Lillian Rich. Her work in sound films included portraying a chorus girl in The Jazz Singer (1927), and acting in Rinty of the Desert (1928). She was one of 13 young women named 1927 WAMPAS Baby Stars.

In 1929 she appeared in only three films, but unlike many silent film stars she did make a successful transition to talkies in 1930. However, she never received many lead roles, and starred in only one film that year, and another two in 1932. After having a starring role in the 1933 film Justice Takes a Holiday opposite H.B. Warner and Huntley Gordon, she had only one more film acting role. Her last role was in the 1935 film The Marriage Bargain, alongside Lon Chaney Jr. and Lila Lee. She retired shortly thereafter.

Ferris was married to Archer Huntington. Ferris died on May 3, 1990, in Los Angeles.

== Selected filmography ==
- 1927: Woman's Law, as Rose La Pierre, produced by Dallas M. Fitzgerald
- 1927: The Silver Slave, as Janet Randall, produced by Howard Bretherton
- 1927: Ginsberg the Great, as Mary, produced by Byron Haskin
- 1927: The Jazz Singer, as a singer, produced by Alan Crosland
- 1927: Sailor Izzy Murphy, as Marie, produced by Henry Lehrman
- 1927: Slightly Used, as Helen Martin, produced by Archie Mayo
- 1928: Women They Talk About, as Audrey Hughes, produced by Lloyd Bacon
- 1928: Powder My Back, as Ruth Stevens, produced by Roy Del Ruth
- 1928: Rinty of the Desert, as May, produced by D. Ross Lederman
- 1928: The Little Wildcat, as June, produced by Ray Enright
- 1928: The Lion and the Mouse (uncredited), produced by Lloyd Bacon
- 1928: Beware of Bachelors, as May, a woman, produced by Roy Del Ruth
- 1928: Beware of Married Men, as Helene Martin, produced by Archie Mayo
- 1928: The Little Wildcat, as Audrey, produced by Ray Enright
- 1929: Fancy Baggage, as Naomi Iverson, produced by Joseph Santley
- 1929: The Glad Rag Dog, as Bertha Fairchild, produced by Joseph Santley
- 1929: Honky Tonk, as Jean Gilmore, produced by Lloyd Bacon
- 1930: Undertow, as Kitty, produced by Snub Pollard
- 1932: Taxi (uncredited), produced by Roy Del Ruth
- 1932: That Rascal, produced by Al Christie
- 1932: Honeymoon Beach, as Connie Watts, produced by Harry Edwards
- 1933: Justice Takes a Holiday, as Margaret Walker, produced by Spencer Gordon Bennet
- 1935: The Marriage Bargain, as Mabel Stanhope, produced by Albert Ray
