= Frank Kesson =

American cinematographer (1885-1939)

- Born: August 27, 1885; Cleveland, Ohio, United States
- Died: September 29, 1939 (aged 54); Cleveland, Ohio, United States
- Occupation: Cinematographer

Frank Kesson (27 August 1885 – 29 September 1939) was an American cinematographer. He worked with Byron Haskin in The Sea Beast (1926), the Spanish western film El hombre malo (1930), El cantante de Nápoles (1935) with William Rees, La dama atrevida (1931), La llamada sagrada (1931), Die heilige Flamme (1931), and Millionaires (1926).

He also worked in How I Play Golf - Trouble Shots (1931), Beware of Bachelors (1928) with Norbert Brodin, Beware of Married Men (1928), Bobbed Hair (1925), Rinty of the Desert (1928), Why Girls Go Back Home (1926), Women They Talk About (1928), While London Sleeps (1926).

He died on 29 September 1939.

== Filmography ==
- Cavalier of the West (1931)
- Die heilige Flamme (1931)
- How I Play Golf (1931)
- La dama atrevida (1931)
- La llama sagrada (1931)
- The Happy Hottentots (1930)
- College Lovers (1930)
- El hombre malo (1930)
- No Defense (1929)
- One Stolen Night (1929)
- My Man (1928)
- Beware of Bachelors (1928)
- Land of the Silver Fox (1928)
- The Midnight Taxi (1928)
- Women They Talk About (1928)
- The Mysterious Airman (1928)
- Rinty of the Desert (1928)
- Powder My Back (1928)
- Beware of Married Men (1928)
- The Silver Slave (1927)
- Sailor Izzy Murphy (1927)
- A Sailor's Sweetheart (1927)
- Simple Sis (1927)
- The Climbers (1927)
- Matinee Ladies (1927)
- Hills of Kentucky (1927)
- While London Sleeps (1927)
- The Sea Beast (1926)
- Bobbed Hair (1925)
- His Majesty, Bunker Bean (1925)

== Bibliography ==
- Gevinson, Alan (1997). Within Our Gates: Ethnicity in American Feature Films, 1911-1960. University of California Press. p. 1571. ISBN 9780520209640.
- Munden, Kenneth White (1997). The American Film Institute Catalog of Motion Pictures Produced in the United States. Vol. Part 1. University of California Press. p. 2600. ISBN 9780520209695.
