= Hills of Kentucky =

1927 film

- Billy Kent Schaefer and Rin Tin Tin
- Directed by: Howard Bretherton
- Screenplay by: Edward Clark
- Based on: The Untamed Heart by Dorothy Yost
- Starring: Rin Tin Tin; Jason Robards, Sr. Dorothy Dwan
- Cinematography: Frank Kesson
- Production company: Warner Bros.
- Distributed by: Warner Bros.
- Release date: February 19, 1927
- Running time: 70 minutes
- Country: United States
- Languages: Silent (English intertitles); Vitaphone (sound effects and music score)
- Budget: $99,000
- Box office: $335,000

Hills of Kentucky is a 1927 American silent drama film directed by Howard Bretherton and written by Edward Clark. The film stars Rin Tin Tin, Jason Robards, Sr. and Dorothy Dwan. The silent film was released by Warner Bros. on February 19, 1927, with a synchronized musical score (with sound effects using the Vitaphone sound-on-disc process).

== Cast ==
- Rin Tin Tin as The Grey Ghost
- Jason Robards, Sr. as Steve Harley
- Dorothy Dwan as Janet
- Tom Santschi as Ben Harley
- Billy Kent Schaefer as Crippled boy
- Nanette as herself

== Production ==
Hills of Kentucky was originally slated to be directed by Herman C. Raymaker, who had directed four previous Rin Tin Tin films. But in November 1926, Howard Bretherton was announced to direct instead, with filming beginning in early December and production ending in early February. It was filmed partially on location at Kern River.

== Box office ==
According to Warner Bros. records, the film earned $239,000 domestically and $96,000 foreign.

== Preservation status ==
Prints are held, incomplete and abridged, at the George Eastman Museum Motion Picture Collection and UCLA Film & Television Archive. A 16mm copy is housed at the Wisconsin Center for Film and Theater Research.

== See also ==
- List of early Warner Bros. sound and talking features
