= George Fawcett =

American actor

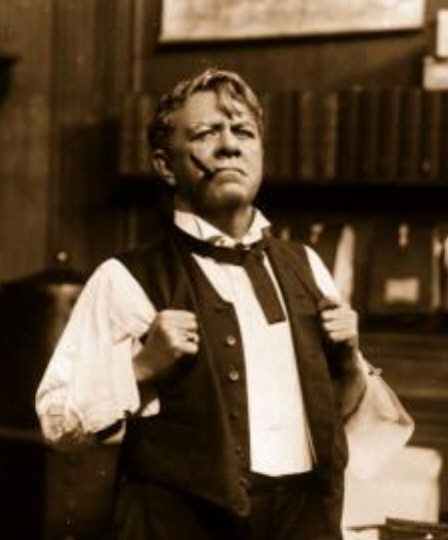
- Fawcett in the play The Great John Ganton, 1909
- Born: August 25, 1860; Alexandria, Virginia, US
- Died: June 6, 1939 (aged 78); Nantucket, Massachusetts, US
- Education: University of Virginia
- Occupation: Actor
- Years active: 1897–1933
- Spouse: Percy Haswell (m. 1895) (1 daughter)

George Fawcett (August 25, 1860 – June 6, 1939) was an American stage and film actor of the silent era.

== Biography ==
Born in Alexandria, Virginia, in 1860, Fawcett graduated from the University of Virginia. His initial inclination was to be an attorney, but he became a Shakespearean actor instead.

Fawcett had his own acting troupe, the Fawcett Stock Company. He appeared on stage in such plays as Ghosts (1905) with Mary Shaw, The Squaw Man (1905) with William Faversham, The Great John Ganton (1909) with an up-and-coming actress Laurette Taylor in the cast, and Getting a Polish (1910) with actress May Irwin. He portrayed Inspector Cochrane in the 1914-1915 hit Broadway play The Law of the Land at the 48th Street Theatre.

Fawcett's film debut came in 1915 in The Majesty of the Law, and he appeared in 151 films between 1915 and 1933. He also directed films. He returned to the stage in 1930 in a production of The Great John Ganton at the Vine Theater in Los Angeles.

Fawcett married actress Percy Haswell, and they had one daughter. Fawcett died in Nantucket, Massachusetts in 1939.

== Partial filmography ==
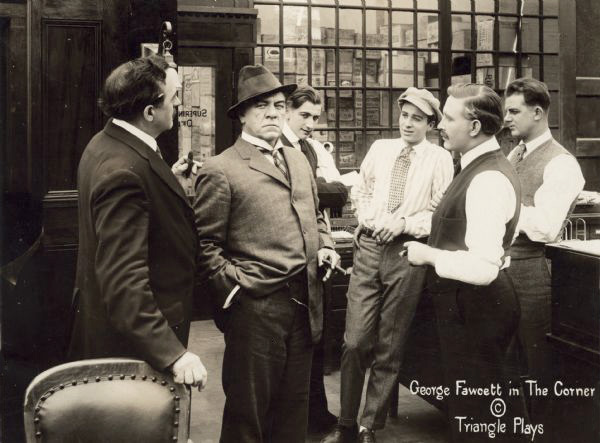
In a still from The Corner (1916), millionaire David Waltham (played by George Fawcett, holding a cigar and scowling) stands in a group of businessmen.

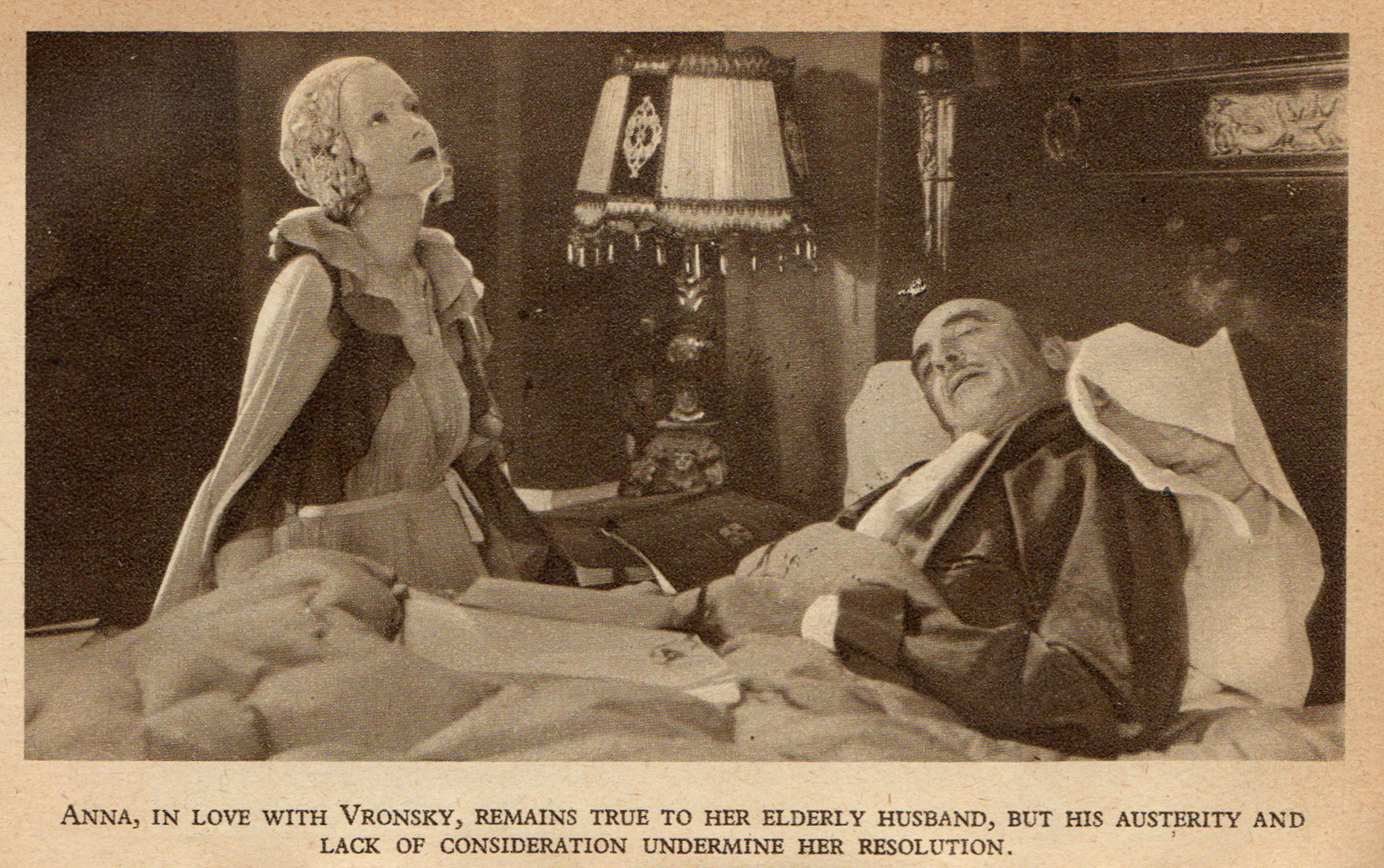
In a still from Love (1927).

- The Habit of Happiness (1916)
- The Crisis (1916)
- Panthea (1917)
- Shirley Kaye (1917)
- The Cinderella Man (1917)
- The Heart of Texas Ryan (1917)
- The Great Love (1918)
- The Beloved Traitor (1918)
- The Talk of the Town (1918)
- Lillian Gish in a Liberty Loan Appeal (1918)
- The Hope Chest (1918)
- A Romance of Happy Valley (1919)
- I'll Get Him Yet (1919)
- The Railroader (1919)
- True Heart Susie (1919)
- The Greatest Question (1919)
- Babs (1920)
- Dangerous Business (1920)
- Good References (1920)
- Two Weeks (1920)
- Paying the Piper (1921)
- Sentimental Tommy (1921)
- Chivalrous Charley (1921)
- Nobody (1921)
- Burn 'Em Up Barnes (1921)
- Little Italy (1921)
- Such a Little Queen (1921) (*director only)
- Forever (1921)
- Hush Money (1921)
- The Way of a Maid (1921)
- Isle of Doubt (1922)
- Destiny's Isle (1922)
- Polly of the Follies (1922)
- The Curse of Drink (1922)
- Ebb Tide (1922)
- Beyond the Rainbow (1922)
- Silas Marner (1922)
- John Smith (1922)
- Manslaughter (1922)
- His Wife's Husband (1922)
- Java Head (1923)
- The Woman With Four Faces (1923)
- His Children's Children (1923)
- West of the Water Tower (1923)
- Just Like a Woman (1923)
- Pied Piper Malone (1924)
- Triumph (1924)
- The Bedroom Window (1924)
- A Lost Lady (1924)
- In Every Woman's Life (1924)
- The Sporting Venus (1925)
- The Sporting Chance (1925)
- The Merry Widow (1925)
- The Circle (1925)
- Thank You (1925)
- Some Pun'kins (1925)
- The Verdict (1925)
- The Fighting Cub (1925)
- Souls for Sables (1925)
- Go Straight (1925)
- Nine and Three-Fifths Seconds (1925)
- There You Are! (1926)
- Out of the Storm (1926)
- The Flaming Frontier (1926)
- Under Western Skies (1926)
- Son of the Sheik (1926)
- Flesh and the Devil (1926)
- Two Can Play (1926)
- The Little Firebrand (1926)
- See You in Jail (1927)
- Riding to Fame (1927)
- Duty's Reward (1927)
- Snowbound (1927)
- Rich Men's Sons (1927)
- Tillie the Toiler (1927)
- Hard-Boiled Haggerty (1927)
- Spring Fever (1927)
- Love (1927)
- The Enemy (1927)
- The Wedding March (1928)
- Tempest (1928)
- The Little Wildcat (1928)
- Prowlers of the Sea (1928)
- Lady of the Pavements (1929)
- Fancy Baggage (1929)
- Tide of Empire (1929)
- The Four Feathers (1929)
- The Gamblers (1929)
- Wonder of Women (1929)
- Hearts in Exile (1929)
- The Bad One (1930)
- Swing High (1930)
- Ladies of Leisure (1930)
- Hello Sister (1930)
- A Woman of Experience (1931)
- Hello, Sister! (1933)
