= Undertow (1930 film) =

1930 film

- Directed by: Harry A. Pollard
- Screenplay by: Edward T. Lowe, Jr. Winifred Reeve
- Produced by: Carl Laemmle
- Starring: Mary Nolan; Johnny Mack Brown; Robert Ellis; Churchill Ross; Audrey Ferris
- Cinematography: Jerome Ash
- Edited by: Daniel Mandell
- Music by: Sam Perry
- Production company: Universal Pictures
- Distributed by: Universal Pictures
- Release date: March 1930
- Running time: 65 minutes
- Country: United States
- Language: English

Undertow is a 1930 American drama film directed by Harry A. Pollard, written by Edward T. Lowe, Jr. and Winnifred Reeve, and starring Mary Nolan, Johnny Mack Brown, Robert Ellis, Churchill Ross and Audrey Ferris. It was released in March 1930, by Universal Pictures.

== Cast ==
- Mary Nolan as Sally Blake
- Johnny Mack Brown as Paul Whalen
- Robert Ellis as Jim Paine
- Churchill Ross as Lindy
- Audrey Ferris as Kitty
