= The Singer of Naples =

1935 film

- Directed by: Howard Bretherton; Moreno Cuyar
- Written by: Arman Chelieu (novel); Elizabeth Reinhardt; Manuel Reachi
- Produced by: Manuel Reachi
- Starring: Enrico Caruso Jr. Mona Maris; Carmen Río; Alfonso Pedroza
- Cinematography: William Rees; Frank Kesson
- Edited by: Frank Magee
- Music by: Bernhard Kaun
- Production company: Warner Bros. Pictures
- Distributed by: Warner Bros. Pictures
- Release date: February 22, 1935
- Running time: 77 minutes
- Country: United States
- Language: Spanish

The Singer of Naples (Spanish: El cantante de Napoles) is a 1935 American musical film directed by Howard Bretherton and Moreno Cuyar and starring Enrico Caruso Jr., Mona Maris and Carmen Río. It was made in Spanish by the Hollywood studio Warner Bros. Pictures. Unlike many other American Spanish language films of the era it was not a remake of an English language film.

It was the last of Warner Brothers's Hollywood-made Spanish films. The increasing success of dubbing meant that it was less viable to make separate Spanish films, and in future it became more common for films to be made in a single English version and then dubbed into a variety of other languages for global release.

== Plot ==
A blacksmith's son from Naples rises to become a celebrated opera singer, performing at La Scala in Milan.

== Cast ==
- Enrico Caruso Jr. as Enrico Daspurro
- Mona Maris as Teresa
- Carmen Río as Maria
- Alfonso Pedroza as Fortuni
- Antonio Vidal as Prof. Rubini
- Emilia Leovalli as Signora Daspurro
- Enrique Acosta as Signor Daspurro
- Francisco Marán as Eduardo
- Martin Garralaga as Beppo
- María Calvo as Signora Corelli
- Rosa Rey as Doña Rosa
- Chevo Pirrín as Mensajero
- Terry La Franconi as Cantante
- Felipe Osta as Carlo

== Bibliography ==
- Waldman, Harry. Hollywood and the Foreign Touch: A Dictionary of Foreign Filmmakers and Their Films from America, 1910-1995. Scarecrow Press, 1996.
