= William Rees (cinematographer) =

American cinematographer (1906–1961)

- Born: 1906; Miller County, Arkansas, United States
- Died: October 1, 1961 (aged 54–55)
- Occupation: Cinematographer

William Rees (1906 – October 1, 1961) was an American cinematographer who filmed 33 movies from 1923 to 1935. He worked with Frank Kesson in El cantante de Nápoles (1935).

== Partial filmography ==
- When Danger Calls (1927)
- Fancy Baggage (1929)
- Hardboiled Rose (1929)
- Hearts in Exile (1929)
- Under a Texas Moon (1930)
- Scarlet Pages (1930)
- Murder at Midnight (1931)
- The Maltese Falcon (1931)
- The Kennel Murder Case (1933)
- The Case of the Howling Dog (1934)
- Housewife (1934)
- Fashions of 1934 (1934)
- The Singer of Naples (1935)
- Don't Bet on Blondes (1935)
