= Irene Rich =

American actress (1891–1988)

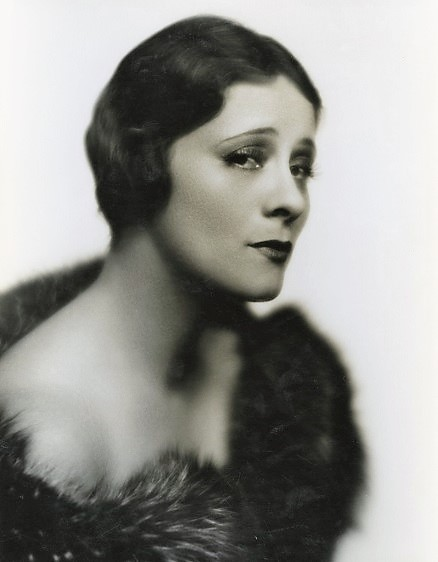
- Rich in 1930
- Born: Irene Frances Luther; October 13, 1891; Buffalo, New York, U.S.
- Died: April 22, 1988 (aged 96); Hope Ranch, California, U.S.
- Occupation: Actress
- Years active: 1918–1949
- Spouses: Elvo Deffenbaugh (m. 1909; div. 1911) Charles Rich (m. 1912; div. 1916) David F. Blankenhorn (m. 1927; div. 1931) George Henry Clifford (m. 1950; died 1959)
- Children: 2, including Frances Rich

Irene Frances Rich (née Luther; October 13, 1891 – April 22, 1988) was an American actress who worked in both silent films, talkies, and radio.

== Early life ==
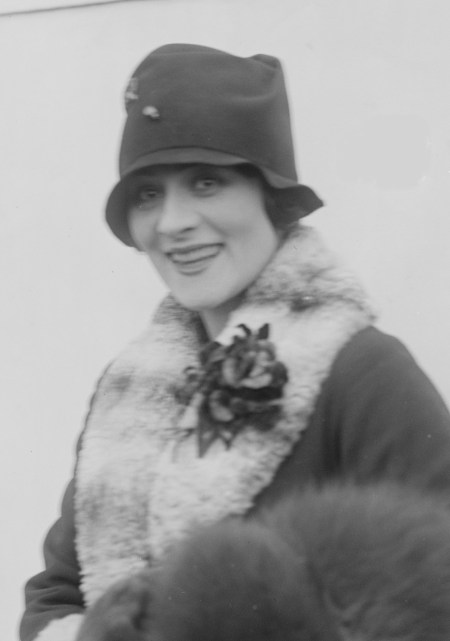
Irene Rich

Rich was born in Buffalo, New York.

At age 17, she wed Elvo Elcourt Deffenbaugh at All Saints' Cathedral in Spokane, Washington on February 17, 1909, after her parents talked about sending her to boarding school. The couple had one child, born Irene Frances Luther Deffenbaugh, who later adopted her stepfather's surname and was a stage and film actress in the 1930s known as Frances Rich before becoming a noted sculptor. Elvo Deffenbaugh was a salesman who traveled a lot. The young family moved to the Bay Area of San Francisco, where the marriage ended after two years.

Next, Irene married Charles Henry Rich, who was then a lieutenant in the United States Army (became a major during World War I and was later a lieutenant colonel), in Portland, Oregon on January 9, 1912. The two had met when he was stationed with the 25th Infantry at Fort George Wright in Spokane. They had one daughter, Martha Jane Rich, who was born on December 13, 1916. The marriage ended after four years. Luther went into real estate to provide for herself and her daughters. She then went to Hollywood in 1918 and found work as an extra.

== Career ==
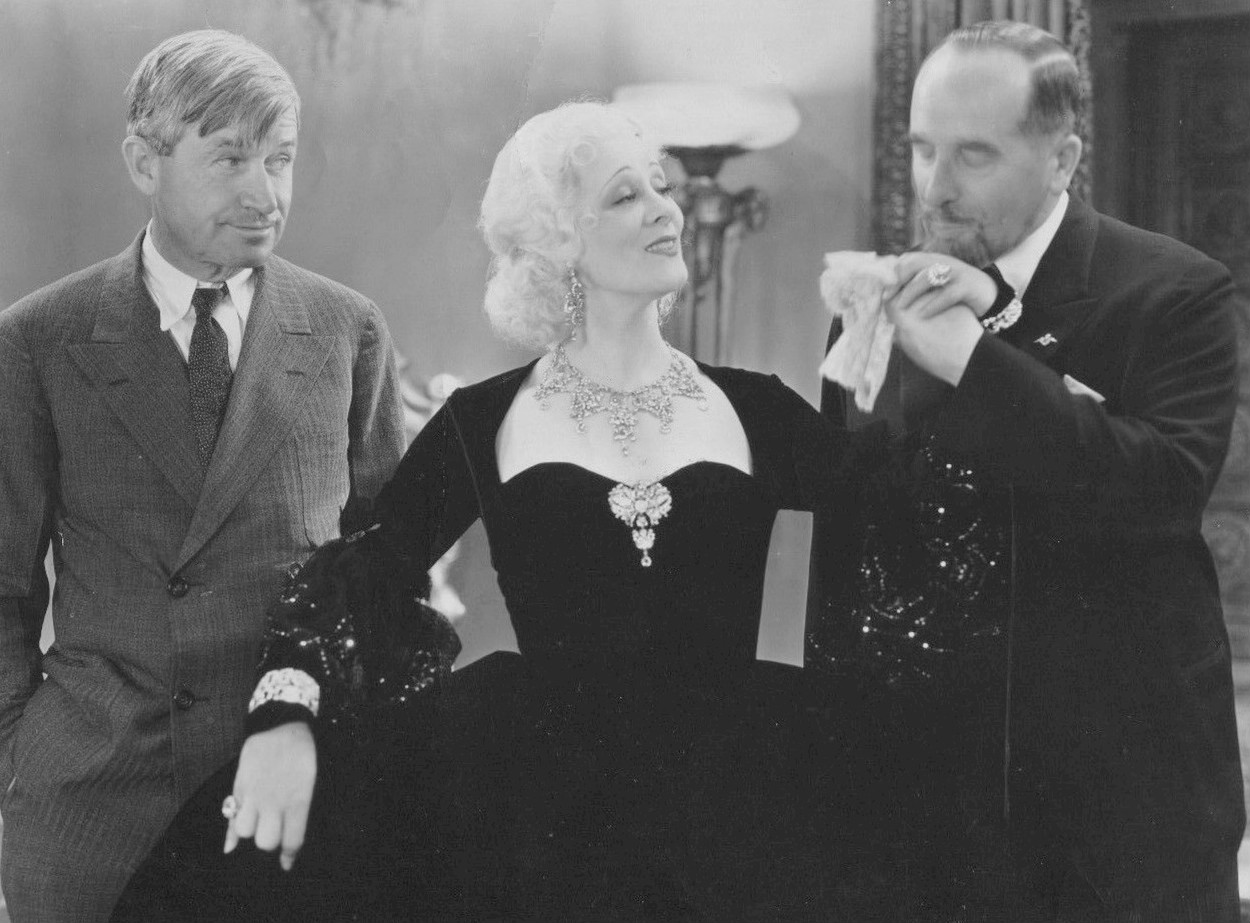
Rich with Will Rogers and Theodore Lodi in Down to Earth, 1932

Rich worked for Will Rogers, who used her in eight pictures, including Water Water Everywhere (1920), The Strange Boarder (1920), Jes' Call Me Jim (1920), Boys Will Be Boys (1921) and The Ropin' Fool (1921). She often portrayed society women, such as in the 1925 adaptation of Lady Windermere's Fan and also in Queen of the Yukon (1940). In two of her last films she played a frontier wife and mother. She was the mother of Gail Russell's character 'Penelope Worth', in John Wayne's Angel and the Badman as well as in John Ford's cavalry story Fort Apache in which she portrayed Mrs. O'Rourke, the wife of Sergeant O'Rourke (Ward Bond).

In the 1930s, Rich did much work in radio. From 1933 to 1944, she hosted a nationwide anthology program of serialized mini-dramas, Dear John (aka The Irene Rich Show). Her leading man was actor Gale Gordon, (who later played Lucille Ball's apoplectic boss "Mr. Mooney" on TV). In the early 1940s, Rich starred in Glorious One on NBC Blue. Rich appeared in stage productions, including Seven Keys to Baldpate (1935) which starred George M. Cohan, the creator of the play, and later As the Girls Go in 1948.

== Personal life ==
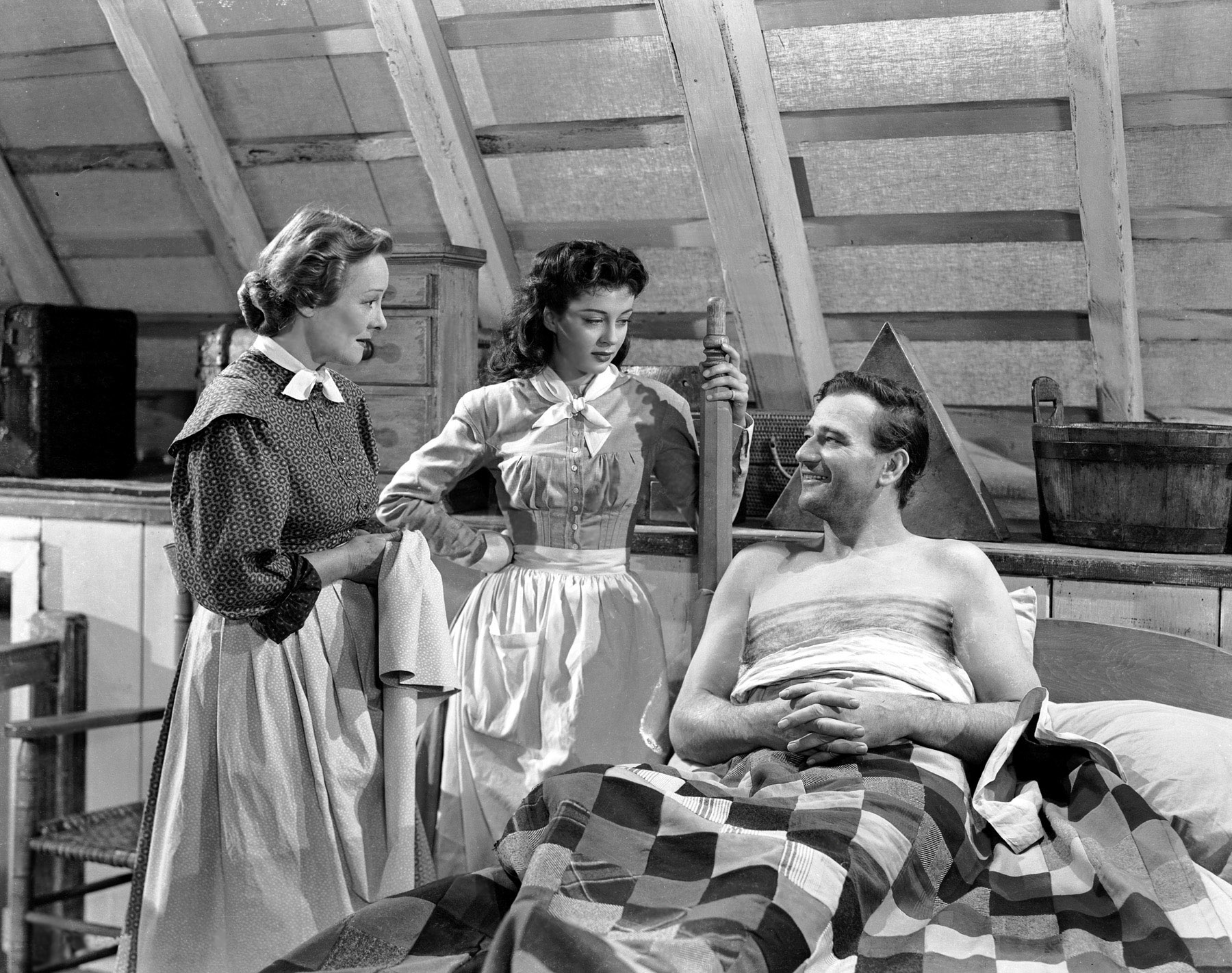
Irene Rich, Gail Russell and John Wayne in Angel and the Badman (1947)

Rich married for the third time on April 6, 1927 in Del Monte, California, to real estate mogul David Ferguson Blankenhorn (1886–1969), at the home of William May Garland. Blankenhorn was well known in the Los Angeles real estate market, was a longtime resident of Pasadena and San Francisco, and handled the transaction of William Wrigley Jr. purchasing Catalina Island in 1919. Rich and Blankenhorn separated at least three times in the summer and fall of 1931, they filed for divorce on October 30, 1931, they were divorced that November.

She became involved in a deadly love triangle in 1949 when Agnes Elizabeth Garnier shot and killed wealthy businessman John Edwin Owen (1881–1949). Owen, formerly a businessman and politician from Michigan, was president of the National Apartment House Owners' Association, among other business interests, including cattle and horse ranching in Gunnison, Colorado and Riverside, California. The Riverside County Sheriff's Department investigator said that Garnier killed Owen (who was married, but estranged and separated from his wife) and blamed Rich for coming between them. Garnier, Owen's personal secretary, told the district attorney that the gun went off accidentally and she took the gun from an intoxicated Owen as he was going to bed. Rich said that she was not in love with Owen and that they were just friends. Garnier pleaded not guilty. The prosecutor decided not to try for first degree murder, and she was found guilty of manslaughter, and received a sentence of "one-to-ten" years. Garnier, after losing her appeal in January 1950, was released from Tehachapi Prison in May 1951 after serving less than a year-and-a-half. She died in San Diego in 1990 at the age of 93.

== Family and death ==
Rich was married four times, the first time at age 17. She had two daughters, Frances and Jane. On February 28, 1950, Rich married her last husband, George Henry Clifford (1881–1959), a public utilities executive, at The Sherry-Netherland Hotel in New York City. He was president of Stone & Webster Service Corporation. The couple bought an avocado ranch within Hope Ranch, near Santa Barbara, in 1956, where they lived out the remainder of their lives.

On April 22, 1988, Irene Rich died at age 96 of heart failure in Hope Ranch, California.

Rich has two stars on the Hollywood Walk of Fame, one for her contribution to the motion picture industry at 6225 Hollywood Boulevard and one for her contributions to the radio industry at 6150 Hollywood Boulevard.

== Filmography ==
Year	Title	Role	Notes
1918	A Desert Wooing	Bit Role	Uncredited
1918	The Girl in His House	Betty Burlingham	Lost film
1918	A Law Unto Herself	Stephanie	
1919	Todd of the Times	Janet Milton	Lost film
1919	The Man in the Open	Kate	Lost film
1919	Diane of the Green Van	Keela	Lost film
1919	The Silver Girl	Julia Raymond	
1919	Castles in the Air	Mrs. Owen Pauncefort	Lost film
1919	The Lone Star Ranger	Mrs. Laramie	Lost film
1919	The Blue Bonnet	Martha Drake	Lost film
1919	The Sneak	Enid Granley	Lost film
1919	Wolves of the Night	Juanita	Lost film
1919	Her Purchase Price	Marda	Lost film
1919	The Spite Bride	Eileen Moore	
1920	Water, Water, Everywhere	Hope Beecher	Lost film
1920	The Street Called Straight	Drusilla Fane	Lost film
1920	The Strange Boarder	Jane Ingraham	Lost film
1920	Jes' Call Me Jim	Miss Butterworth	
1920	Stop Thief	Madge Carr	
1920	Just Out of College	Miss Jones	Lost film
1920	Godless Men	Black Pawl's Wife	
1921	Sunset Jones	Marion Rand	Lost film
1921	One Man in a Million	Madame Maureveau	Lost film
1921	Boys Will Be Boys	Lucy	Lost film
1921	A Tale of Two Worlds	Mrs. Carmichael	
1921	A Voice in the Dark	Blanche Walton	
1921	Desperate Trails	Mrs. Walker	Lost film
1921	The Invisible Power	Laura Chadwick	Lost film
1921	The Poverty of Riches	Mrs. Holt	Lost film
1922	The Call of Home	Alix Lansing	Lost film
1922	Strength of the Pines	Linda	Lost film
1922	The Trap	The Teacher	
1922	One Clear Call	Maggie Thornton	
1922	A Fool There Was	Mrs. Schuyler	Lost film
1922	The Yosemite Trail	Eve Marsham	Lost film
1922	The Ropin' Fool	The Girl	Short
1922	Brawn of the North	Marion Wells	Lost film
1922	While Justice Waits	Nell Hunt	Lost film
1922	The Marriage Chance	Mary Douglas	Lost film
1922	Fruits of Faith	Larry's Wife	Short
1923	Dangerous Trails	Grace Alderson	
1923	Brass	Mrs. Grotenberg / aka Mrs. G	
1923	Snowdrift	Kitty	Lost film
1923	Michael O'Halloran	Nellie Minturn	Lost film
1923	Yesterday's Wife	Megan Daye	Lost film
1923	Rosita	The Queen	
1923	Defying Destiny	Beth Alden	
1923	Lucretia Lombard	Lucretia Morgan	
1923	Boy of Mine	Ruth Latimer	Lost film
1924	Pal o' Mine	Julia Montfort	
1924	Beau Brummel	Frederica Charlotte, Duchess of York	
1924	Cytherea	Fanny Randon	Lost film
1924	Being Respectable	Suzanne Schuyler	Lost film
1924	Captain January	Isabelle Morton	
1924	A Woman Who Sinned	Mrs. Ransdell	Lost film
1924	Behold This Woman	Louise Maurel	
1924	What the Butler Saw	Mrs. Barrington	
1924	This Woman	Carol Drayton	
1924	A Lost Lady	Marian Forrester	Lost film
1925	My Wife and I	Mrs. James Borden	Lost film
1925	The Man Without a Conscience	Shirley Graves	
1925	Eve's Lover	Eva Burnside	Lost film
1925	The Wife Who Wasn't Wanted	Mrs. John Mannering	Lost film
1925	Compromise	Joan Trevore	Lost film
1925	The Pleasure Buyers	Joan Wiswell	
1925	Lady Windermere's Fan	Mrs. Erlynne	
1926	Silken Shackles	Denise Lake	Lost film
1926	The Honeymoon Express	Mary Lambert	Lost film
1926	My Official Wife	Helene, Countess Orloff	Lost film
1927	Don't Tell the Wife	Mrs. Cartier	Lost film
1927	The Climbers	Duchess of Arrogan	Lost film
1927	Dearie	Sylvia Darling / aka "Dearie"	Lost film
1927	The Desired Woman	Diana Maxwell	Lost film
1927	The Silver Slave	Bernice Randall	Lost film
1928	Beware of Married Men	Myra Martin	Incomplete film, one reel survives
1928	Across the Atlantic	Minor Role	Lost film Uncredited
1928	Powder My Back	Fritzi Foy	Lost film
1928	Craig's Wife	Mrs. Craig	Lost film
1928	The Perfect Crime	Stella	Lost film first Irene Rich film to have dialogue, a part-talkie from FBO
1928	Women They Talk About	Irene Mervin Hughes	Lost film
1928	Ned McCobb's Daughter	Carol	Lost film
1929	Daughters of Desire		
1929	The Exalted Flapper	Queen Charlotte of Capra	Lost film
1929	They Had to See Paris	Idy Peters	
1929	Shanghai Rose	Shanghai Rose	
1930	So This Is London	Mrs. Hiram Draper	
1930	On Your Back	Julianne	
1930	Check and Double Check	Mrs. Blair	
1931	Beau Ideal	Lady Brandon	
1931	Father's Son	Ruth Emory	
1931	Strangers May Kiss	Celia	
1931	Five and Ten	Jenny Rarick	
1931	The Mad Parade	Mrs. Schuyler	
1931	Wicked	Mrs. Luther	
1931	The Champ	Linda Carleton	
1932	Down to Earth	Idy Peters	
1932	Her Mad Night	Joan Manners	
1932	Manhattan Tower	Ann Burns	
1934	Spitfire	Woman	(scenes deleted)
1938	Hollywood Handicap	Woman at Racetrack	Short; Uncredited
1938	That Certain Age	Dorothy Fullerton	
1939	The Right Way	Mrs. Martin	Short
1939	Everybody's Hobby	Mrs. Myra Leslie	
1940	The Mortal Storm	Mrs. Emilia Roth	
1940	The Lady in Question	Michele Morestan	
1940	Queen of the Yukon	Sadie Martin	
1940	Keeping Company	Mrs. Thomas	
1941	Three Sons o' Guns	Mrs. Margaret Patterson	
1942	This Time for Keeps	Mrs. Bryant	Alternative title: Over the Waves
1947	Calendar Girl	Lulu Varden	Alternative title: Star Dust and Sweet Music
1947	Angel and the Badman	Mrs. Worth	
1947	New Orleans	Mrs. Rutledge Smith	
1948	Fort Apache	Mary O'Rourke	
1948	Joan of Arc	Catherine le Royer	
Television
Year	Title	Role	Notes
1949	The Chevrolet Tele-Theatre		1 episode, (final appearance)
