= Archie Mayo =

American actor and film director (1891–1968)

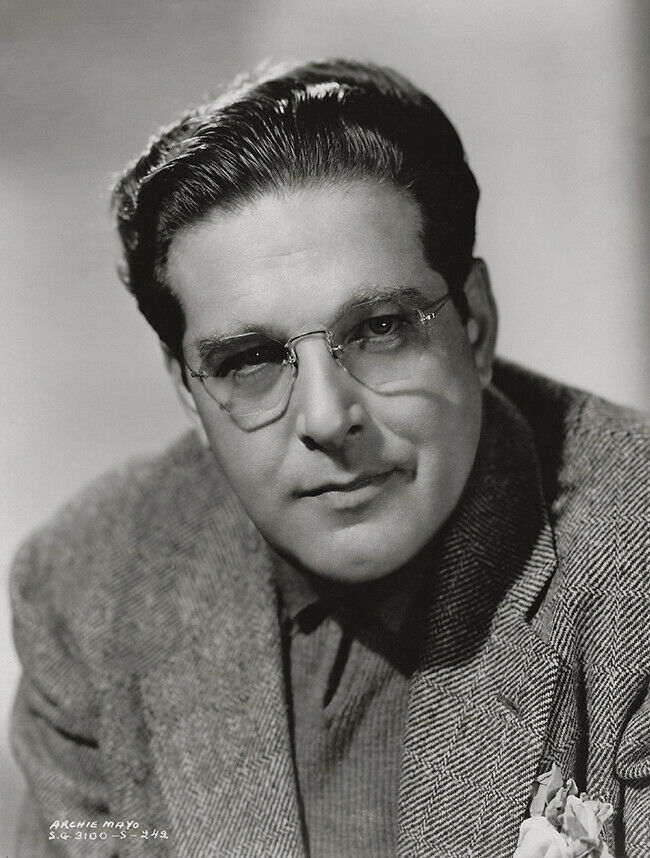
- Mayo in 1938
- Born: Archibald Louis Mayo; January 29, 1891; New York City, U.S.
- Died: December 4, 1968 (aged 77); Guadalajara, Mexico
- Education: Columbia University
- Occupations: Actor, film director, screenwriter
- Years active: 1917–1946
- Spouses: Lucille Wolf (died 1945) Barbara Lane (m. 1945)
- Children: 2

Archibald Louis Mayo (January 29, 1891 – December 4, 1968) was a film director, screenwriter and actor.

== Early years ==
The son of a tailor, Mayo was born in New York City. After attending the city's public schools, he studied at Columbia University.

== Career ==
Mayo moved to Hollywood in 1915, initially working as an extra, and began working as a director in 1917 with L-KO Motion Picture Company and Christie Film Company. His films include Is Everybody Happy? (1929) with Ted Lewis, Bought! (1931) with Constance Bennett, Night After Night (1932) with George Raft and Mae West, The Doorway to Hell (1930) with James Cagney and Lew Ayres, Convention City (1933) with Joan Blondell, The Mayor of Hell (1933) with James Cagney, The Petrified Forest (1936) with Bette Davis, Leslie Howard and Humphrey Bogart, and The Adventures of Marco Polo (1938) with Gary Cooper.

In 1940, Mayo pursued legal action against the Samuel Goldwyn Company who had allegedly threatened to send Mayo to work in England, which was in the midst of World War II, if Mayo did not agree to lengthen his contract with the company.

Mayo retired in 1946, shortly after completing A Night in Casablanca with the Marx Brothers and Angel on My Shoulder with Paul Muni, Anne Baxter, and Claude Rains.

== Recognition ==
Mayo has a star at 6301 Hollywood Boulevard in the Motion Pictures section of the Hollywood Walk of Fame. It was dedicated February 8, 1960.

== Death ==
Mayo died of cancer in Guadalajara, Mexico on December 4, 1968.

== Filmography ==
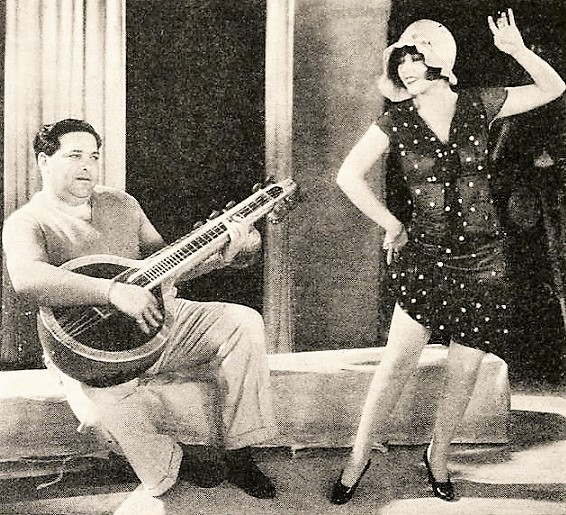
Mayo and Ann Pennington from a 1929 magazine

- All Over Twist (1923)
- Christine of the Big Tops (1926)
- Money Talks (1926)
- Unknown Treasures (1926)
- Johnny Get Your Hair Cut (1927)
- The College Widow (1927)
- Dearie (1927)
- Quarantined Rivals (1927)
- Slightly Used (1927)
- State Street Sadie (1928)
- The Crimson City (1928)
- On Trial (1928)
- My Man (1928)
- Beware of Married Men (1928)
- Sonny Boy (1929)
- Is Everybody Happy? (1929)
- The Sacred Flame (1929)
- Wide Open (1930)
- Courage (1930)
- Oh Sailor Behave (1930)
- The Doorway to Hell (1930)
- Vengeance (1930)
- Illicit (1931)
- Svengali (1931)
- Under Eighteen (1931)
- Bought (1931)
- Night After Night (1932)
- Street of Women (1932)
- Two Against the World (1932)
- The Expert (1932)
- The Life of Jimmy Dolan (1933)
- The Mayor of Hell (1933)
- Ever in My Heart (1933)
- Convention City (1933)
- Gambling Lady (1934)
- The Man with Two Faces (1934)
- Desirable (1934)
- Bordertown (1935)
- Go Into Your Dance (1935)
- The Case of the Lucky Legs (1935)
- The Petrified Forest (1936)
- I Married a Doctor (1936)
- Give Me Your Heart (1936)
- Black Legion (1937)
- It's Love I'm After (1937)
- Call It a Day (1937)
- The Adventures of Marco Polo (1938)
- Youth Takes a Fling (1938)
- They Shall Have Music (1939)
- The House Across the Bay (1940)
- Four Sons (1940)
- The Great American Broadcast (1941)
- Charley's Aunt (1941)
- Confirm or Deny (1941)
- Moontide (1942)
- Orchestra Wives (1942)
- Crash Dive (1943)
- Sweet and Low-Down (1944)
- A Night in Casablanca (1946)
- Angel on My Shoulder (1946)
