= Bobbed Hair (1925 film) =

1925 film

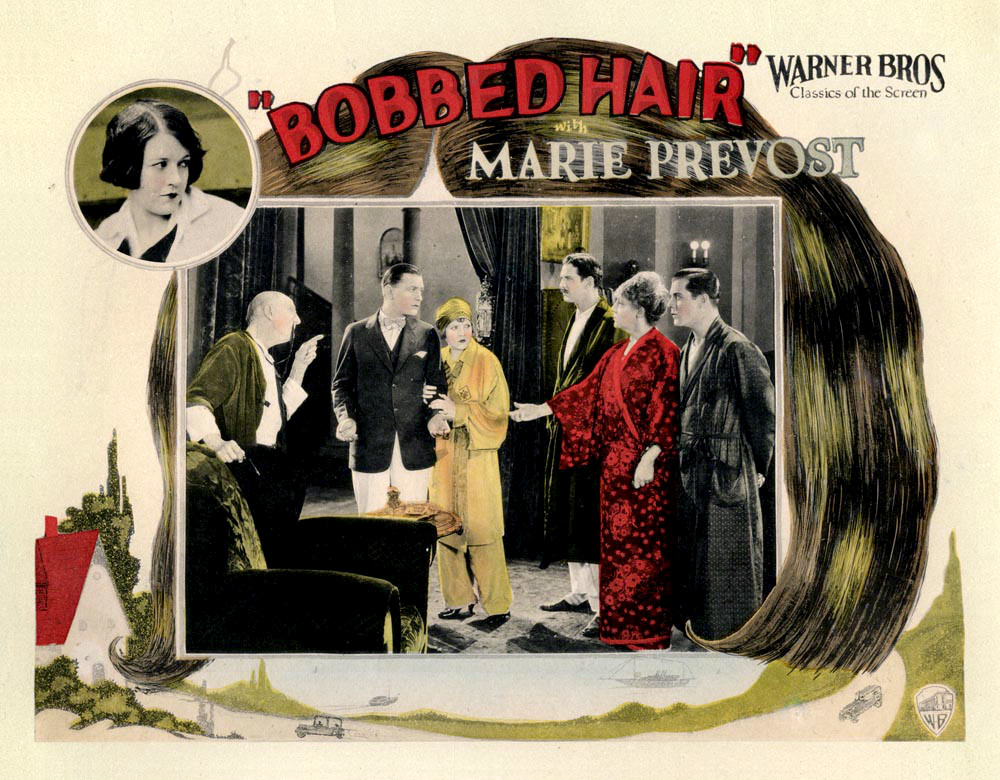
- Lobby card
- Directed by: Alan Crosland
- Written by: Scenario: Lewis Milestone; Jack Wagner
- Story by: Louis Bromfield; Alexander Woollcott
- Based on: Bobbed Hair (1925 novel) by 20 co-authors (see list in article)
- Starring: Marie Prevost; Louise Fazenda; Kenneth Harlan
- Cinematography: Byron Haskin; Frank Kesson
- Production company: Warner Bros.
- Distributed by: Warner Bros.
- Release date: October 25, 1925
- Running time: 80 minutes
- Country: United States
- Language: Silent (English intertitles)

Bobbed Hair is a 1925 American silent comedy film directed by Alan Crosland and starring Marie Prevost, Kenneth Harlan, and Louise Fazenda, and. It was based on a 1925 novel of the same name written by twenty different authors. The film was produced and distributed by Warner Bros.

== Plot ==
As described in a review in a film magazine, Connemara Moore has two suitors. One likes bobbed hair, the other does not. In escaping from both she enters the car of David Lacy, a stranger, which proves to have been stolen from bootleggers and is swept into a succession of situations including an attack by hijackers, a fight in a private yacht, and rescue by David – who takes Connemara to his home.

Eventually it turns out that David was looking for adventure and Connemara has become enmeshed in a trap set by revenue officers. When the time for a show-down comes, she has only one side of her hair bobbed, and this means she has chosen David.

== Cast ==
- Marie Prevost as Connemara Moore
- Kenneth Harlan as David Lacy
- Louise Fazenda as Sweetie
- John Roche as Saltonstall Adams
- Emily Fitzroy as Aunt Celimena Moore
- Reed Howes as Bingham Carrington
- Pat Hartigan as Swede
- Walter Long as Doc
- Francis McDonald as Pooch
- Tom Ricketts as Mr. Brewster
- Otto Hoffman as McTish
- Kate Toncray as Mrs. Parker

Cast notes

- Dolores Costello and Helene Costello appear in bit parts

== Co-authors of the novel ==
- George Agnew Chamberlain – novelist
- George Barr McCutcheon – novelist
- Robert Gordon Anderson – short story writer
- George P. Putnam – publisher of the novel
- Alexander Woollcott – critic and essayist (The Man Who Came to Dinner)
- Meade Minnigerode – co-editor of "The Whiffenpoof Song"
- John V. A. Weaver – poet
- Kermit Roosevelt – Theodore Roosevelt's son
- Dorothy Parker – poet/story writer/dramatist
- Louis Bromfield – novelist
- Gerald Mygatt – journalist
- Carolyn Wells – comic poet/mystery writer
- Rube Goldberg – cartoonist
- Bernice Brown – journalist
- Wallace Irwin – novelist
- Frank Craven – playwright/actor
- H. C. Witwer – comic novelist
- Elsie Janis – vaudeville star/author
- Edward Streeter – author (Father of the Bride)
- Sophie Kerr – novelist

== Preservation status ==
A surviving print of Bobbed Hair is housed in a foreign archive.
