= Silken Shackles =

1926 film by Walter Morosco

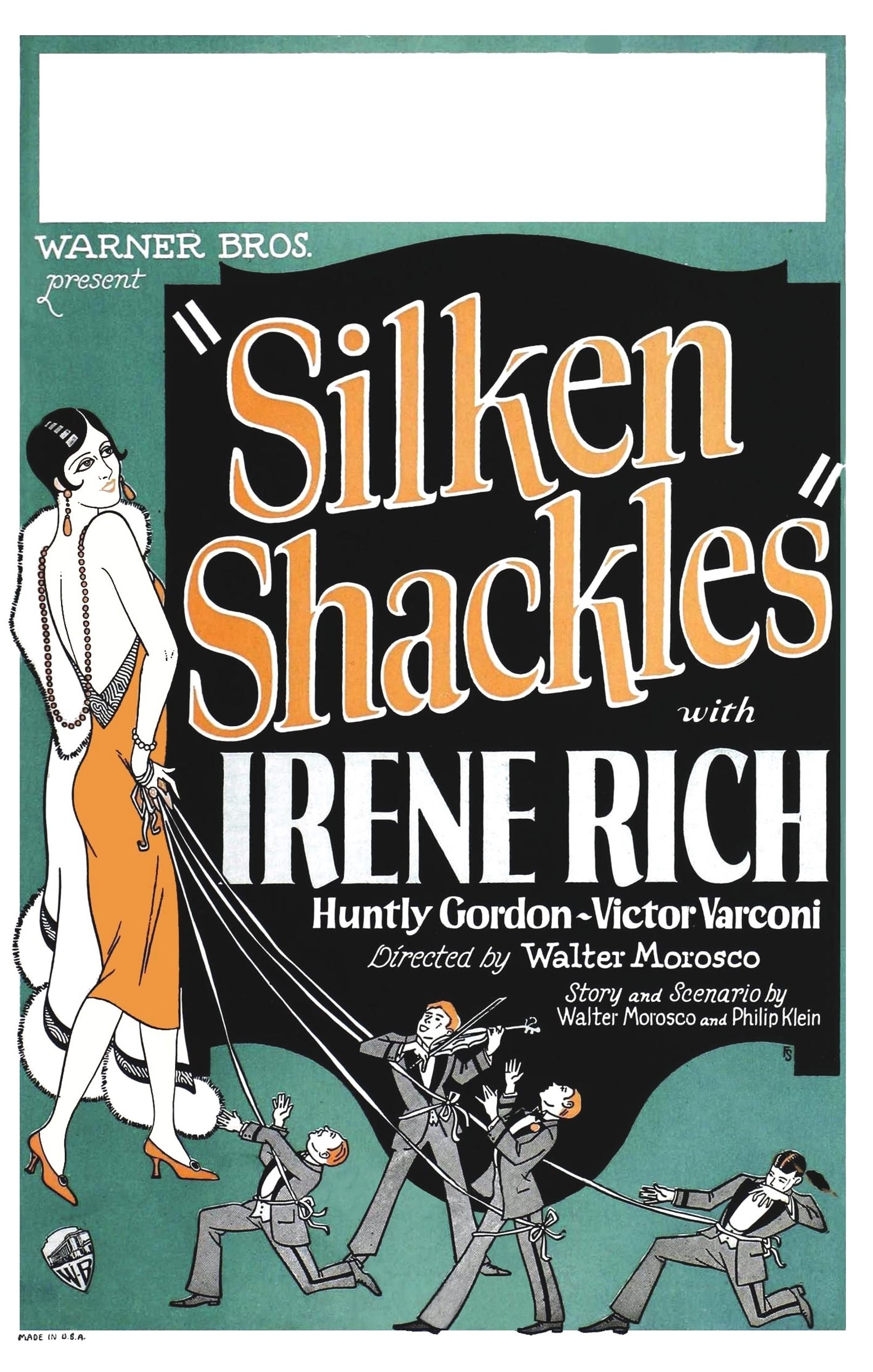
- Theatrical release poster
- Directed by: Walter Morosco
- Screenplay by: Walter Morosco; Philip Klein
- Story by: Walter Morosco; Philip Klein
- Based on: Charles Harris (play)
- Starring: Irene Rich
- Cinematography: John J. Mescall; Bert Shipman (ass't cameraman)
- Production company: Warner Bros.
- Distributed by: Warner Bros.
- Release date: May 14, 1926
- Running time: 60 minutes
- Country: United States
- Language: Silent (English intertitles)

Silken Shackles is a 1926 American silent drama film produced and distributed by Warner Bros. The film was directed by Walter Morosco, the son of theater owner Oliver Morosco, and based on a play by Charles Harris. Irene Rich leads the cast.

== Plot ==
As described in a film magazine review, Howard Lake realizes that he has neglected his wife Denise, so he takes her abroad. With the desire for romance, she flirts with any available man, and her second affair threatens to become serious. After she flirts with young violinist Tade Adrian, Howard seeks to cure her of this romantic fever. He makes a deal with the musician whereby he is to make love to Denise for a sum of money and then Howard is to expose the scheme and show the wife how the violinist was paid for his romantic services. However, the plan miscarries and Howard sees that his wife and the violinist really are in love. As a last resort, Howard digs up information on the low class of Tade's family, which leaves Denise disillusioned. Suddenly, a bolt of lightning, which in the past had always caused Denise to fly towards protection, strikes at this opportune time and she jumps into her husband's arms.

== Cast ==
- Irene Rich as Denise Lake
- Huntley Gordon as Howard Lake
- Bertram Marburgh as Lord Fairchild
- Victor Varconi as Tade Adrian
- Evelyn Selbie as Tade's Mother
- Robert Schable as Frederic Stanhope
- Kalla Pasha as Tade's Father
- Julius Molnar as Child (uncredited)

== Preservation ==
With no prints of Silken Shackles located in any film archives, it is a lost film.
