= Eve's Lover =

1925 film

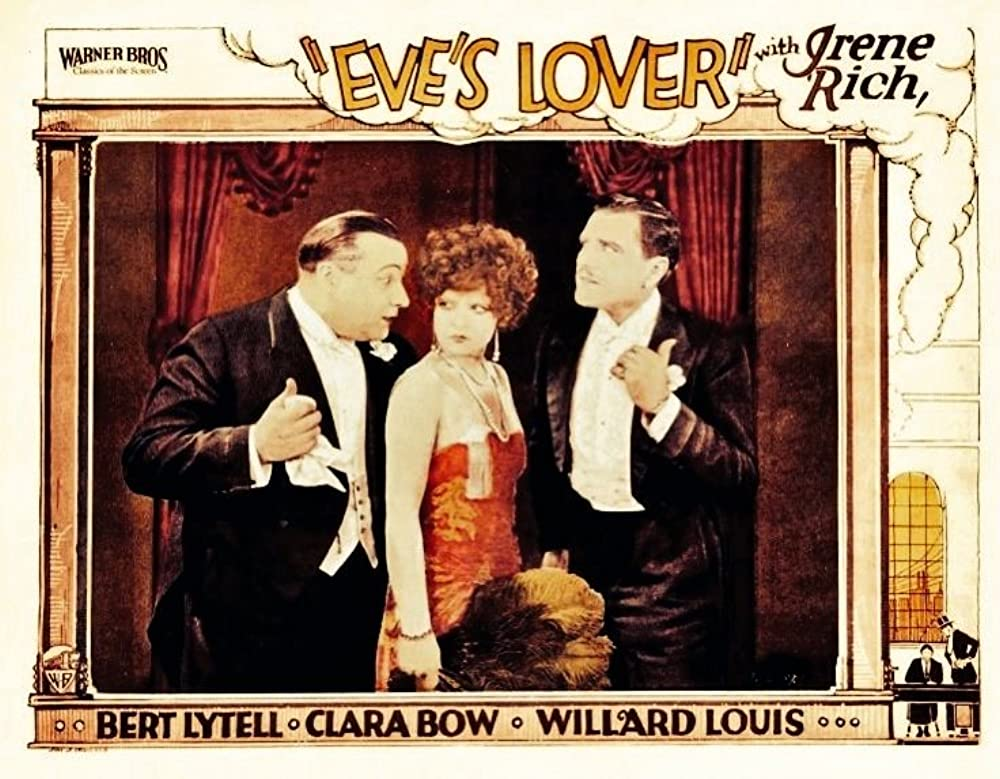
- Directed by: Roy Del Ruth
- Written by: Darryl Francis Zanuck
- Based on: Eve's Lover by Mrs. W. K. Clifford
- Produced by: Warner Brothers
- Starring: Irene Rich; Bert Lytell; Clara Bow
- Cinematography: George Winkler
- Distributed by: Warner Bros.
- Release date: July 6, 1925
- Running time: 7 reels
- Country: United States
- Language: Silent (English intertitles)

Eve's Lover is a 1925 American silent drama film directed by Roy Del Ruth and starring Irene Rich, Bert Lytell, and Clara Bow. The screenplay was by Darryl F. Zanuck from a story by Mrs. W. K. Clifford in Eve's Lover, and Other Stories (c. 1924). Warner Bros. produced and distributed the film.

== Cast ==
- Irene Rich as Eve Burnside
- Bert Lytell as Count Leon Molnar
- Clara Bow as Rena D'Arcy
- Willard Louis as Austin Starfield
- John Steppling as Burton Gregg
- Arthur Hoyt as Amos Potts
- Lew Harvey as Agitator
- Dorothy Dorr (bit part)

== Preservation ==
With no prints of Eve's Lover located in any film archives, it is a lost film.
