= The Little Wildcat =

1928 film

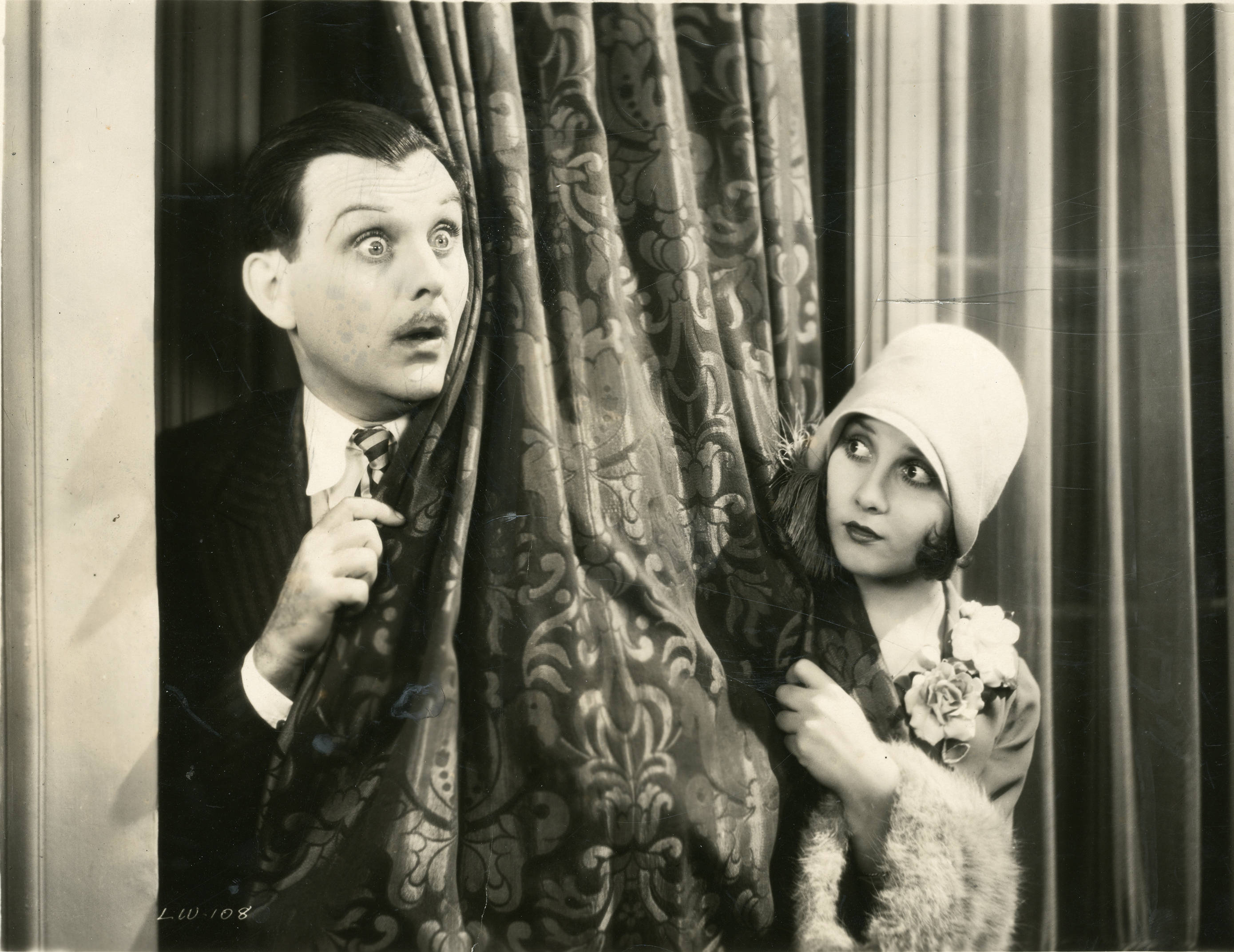
- Still with Ferris and Cooley
- Directed by: Ray Enright
- Written by: Edward T. Lowe Jr.; James A. Starr; Gene Wright
- Starring: Audrey Ferris; James Murray; Robert Edeson
- Cinematography: Ben F. Reynolds
- Edited by: George Marks
- Production company: Warner Bros. Pictures
- Distributed by: Warner Bros. Pictures
- Release date: December 8, 1928
- Country: United States
- Languages: Sound (Part-Talkie); English intertitles

The Little Wildcat is a 1928 American sound part-talkie comedy drama directed by Ray Enright and starring Audrey Ferris, James Murray and Robert Edeson. In addition to sequences with audible dialogue or talking sequences, the film features a synchronized musical score and sound effects along with English intertitles. According to the film review in Variety, about 50 percent of the total running time of 63 minutes featured dialogue. The soundtrack was recorded using the Vitaphone sound-on-disc system.

== Plot ==
Audrey and Sue, spirited granddaughters of war veteran Judge Holt, are two modern Cleopatras constantly at odds over any man who enters their orbit—a classic tangle of lovers, as both fall for the same eligible bachelor. Their current rivalry centers on Conrad Burton, a decorated American ace and charismatic promoter of a new airplane factory. Audrey, already engaged to the mild-mannered Victor Sargeant, toys with both men, while Sue, genuinely in love with Burton, resolves to win him by outmatching her cousin in charm and daring.

Judge Holt, exasperated by the aerial antics over his estate—flown by none other than Conrad himself—refuses to donate the land necessary for the new airport. He considers the skirmishes of love more maddening than any battlefield he's ever known. Sue, determined to change her grandfather's mind and secure both the aviator and his ambitions, writes a note suggesting she'll spend the night at Conrad's apartment, shocking the household.

This daring hotel mix-up triggers a chaotic climax: Conrad's home is soon stormed by Sue, a jealous Audrey, a confused Victor, and Judge Holt himself—dueling pistols in hand—ready to defend family honor. The absurd situation escalates into a full-blown fracas, prompting a police response to what's reported as a riot.

In the whirlwind finale, bursting with sensational surprises and wild comedy, both couples find their footing at last. Audrey sees the error of her ways and chooses faithful Victor, while Sue captures Conrad's heart and her grandfather's blessing. Together, they all elope via airplane, soaring sky-high in a spectacular aviation-themed finish—proof that even the sleekest Cinderella can be outmatched by a little wildcat.

== Cast ==
- Audrey Ferris as Audrey
- James Murray as Conrad Burton
- Robert Edeson as Joel Ketchum
- George Fawcett as Judge Holt
- Hallam Cooley as Victor Sargeant
- Doris Dawson as Sue

== Preservation status ==
The visual portion of this film are now lost. The complete soundtrack to the film has survived on Vitaphone discs.

== See also ==
- List of early sound feature films (1926–1929)
- List of early Warner Bros. sound and talking features

== Bibliography ==
- Roy Liebman. Vitaphone Films: A Catalogue of the Features and Shorts. McFarland, 2003.
