= My Wife and I (film) =

1925 film

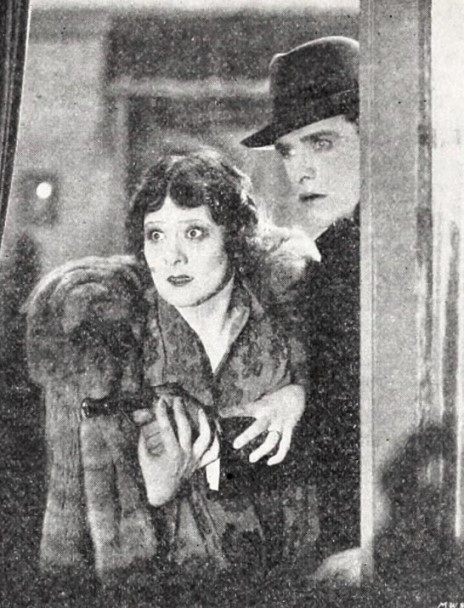
- Still with Irene Rich
- Directed by: Millard Webb
- Screenplay by: Julien Josephson; Millard Webb
- Based on: My Wife and I by Harriet Beecher Stowe
- Starring: Irene Rich; Huntley Gordon; John Harron; John Roche; Constance Bennett
- Production company: Warner Bros.
- Distributed by: Warner Bros.
- Release date: May 16, 1925
- Running time: 70 minutes
- Country: United States
- Language: Silent (English intertitles)

My Wife and I is a 1925 American drama film directed by Millard Webb and written by Julien Josephson and Millard Webb. It is based on the 1871 novel My Wife and I by Harriet Beecher Stowe. The film stars Irene Rich, Huntley Gordon, John Harron, John Roche, Constance Bennett, and Tom Ricketts. The film was released by Warner Bros. on May 16, 1925.

== Plot ==
As described in a film magazine review, Stuart Borden becomes infatuated with Aileen Alton, who is only interested in him as long as he spends money lavishly on her. He runs up so many bills that his father, James Borden, although a millionaire, refuses to honor any more bills. The father denounces the young woman, who then proceeds to throw Stuart down. Through a mutual friend, Aileen meets the father and soon has him in her toils. He then begins to neglect his wife, blaming his business. The wife accidentally discovers a letter from Aileen. When the Bordens celebrate their twenty-fifth wedding anniversary on the same date as Aileen's birthday party, she is piqued because the father cannot get there. She goes to his home and he meets her outside, promising to come see her later. In the meantime Stuart is awaiting her return. The wife has seen the husband kiss Aileen and tells him that he cannot continue on that way. The father says he will go to Europe and goes to bid Aileen goodbye. Stuart calls Aileen, who refuses to talk to him. He rushes out with a handgun and Mrs. Borden follows, arriving just in time to prevent the son from shooting the father. James Borden begs his wife's forgiveness and they start over again.

== Cast ==
- Irene Rich as Mrs. James Borden
- Huntley Gordon as Mr. James Borden
- John Harron as Stuart Borden
- John Roche as Spencer Hobart
- Constance Bennett as Aileen Alton
- Tom Ricketts as Valet
