= The Silver Slave =

1927 film

- Directed by: Howard Bretherton
- Written by: Scenario: Peter Milne; Anthony Coldeway
- Story by: Howard Smith
- Starring: Irene Rich; Audrey Ferris
- Cinematography: Frank Kesson
- Production company: Warner Bros.
- Distributed by: Warner Bros.
- Release date: November 12, 1927
- Running time: 70 minutes
- Country: United States
- Languages: Sound (Synchronized) (English Intertitles)

The Silver Slave is a lost 1927 American synchronized sound drama film directed by Howard Bretherton and starring Irene Rich. While the film has no audible dialog, it was released with a synchronized musical score with sound effects using the Vitaphone sound-on-disc process. The film was produced and distributed by Warner Bros.

== Plot ==
Bernice Randall, once in love with Tom Richards, sacrificed romance for wealth by marrying into money. Years later, widowed and wealthy, Bernice still longs for the life she might have had. When Tom proposes again, she refuses—not out of greed, but to protect her daughter Janet's inheritance. Tom, misunderstanding her motives, bitterly accuses Bernice of being a "silver slave," chained to riches over love.

Devoted to Janet, Bernice pours her fortune into her daughter. Janet, in turn, burns through her mother's wealth to keep up with her debutante lifestyle.

At a summer resort, Janet rejects the sincere devotion of Larry Martin, her humble childhood friend, in favor of the debonair and affluent Philip Caldwell. Though Bernice pleads with Janet to see Larry's genuine worth, the girl is intoxicated by Philip's charm and status.

Growing alarmed, Bernice makes a bold and desperate decision: she will lure Caldwell away from her daughter by pretending to fall for him herself. Her former sweetheart, Tom—now a millionaire—arrives at the resort just in time to witness Bernice's apparent descent back into gold-digging. At a lavish dinner dance, she flirts openly with Philip, who invites her on a moonlit drive to his cottage. She accepts.

Janet, stunned and wounded by her mother's behavior, convinces Tom to follow them. At Philip's cottage, they find Bernice in his arms. Heartbroken, Janet flees. Bernice chases after her, leaving Tom and Caldwell behind.

Back at the hotel, Janet is packing to leave when Tom arrives and tells her the truth: Bernice's flirtation was a ruse to protect her daughter. She had pleaded with Caldwell to give Janet up. Overwhelmed with guilt, Janet rushes out into the hotel grounds—and runs straight into Larry. Hearing her story, Larry realizes that gentleness won't reach her now. He commands her to go to her mother and ask for forgiveness.

Janet returns to Bernice, penitent. Her mother embraces her with quiet wisdom: “I didn’t want my little daughter to make the same mistake I did. Larry is poor, but his love will mean your happiness.”

And so, the woman once accused of being a "silver slave" redeems herself with the selfless act of guiding her daughter to true love—proving that the richest gifts come not from money, but from sacrifice.

== Cast ==
- Irene Rich as Bernice Randall
- Audrey Ferris as Janet Randall
- Holmes Herbert as Tom Richards
- John Miljan as Philip Caldwell
- Carroll Nye as Larry Martin

== See also ==
- List of early sound feature films (1926–1929)
