= Rinty of the Desert =

1928 film

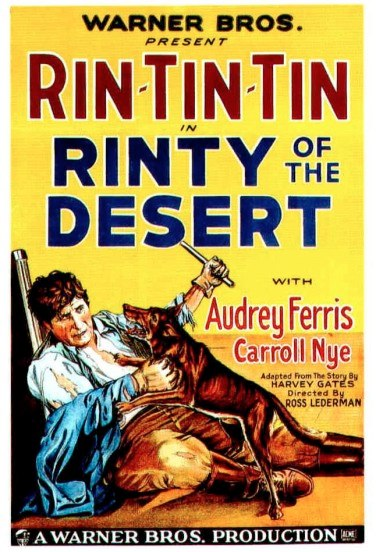
- Theatrical release poster
- Directed by: D. Ross Lederman
- Written by: Harvey Gates; James A. Starr (titles)
- Story by: Frank Steele
- Starring: Rin Tin Tin
- Cinematography: Frank Kesson
- Production company: Warner Bros.
- Distributed by: Warner Bros.
- Release date: April 21, 1928
- Running time: 54 minutes
- Country: United States
- Languages: Sound (Synchronized) (English Intertitles)
- Budget: $66,000
- Box office: $221,000

Rinty of the Desert is a 1928 American synchronized sound drama film directed by D. Ross Lederman. While the film has no audible dialog, it was released with a synchronized musical score with sound effects using the sound-on-disc Vitaphone process. This film is presumed to be lost. According to Warner Bros records, the film earned $164,000 domestically and $57,000 foreign.

== Plot ==
Rinty the courageous dog of the desert, embarks on a thrilling journey from the wild sands to the heart of the bustling city. Rescued and given a home by June, granddaughter of Pop Marlow, the proprietor of a dime museum, he quickly adapts from desert adventurer to skilled thief-tracker navigating the urban jungle.

Pop Marlow grows suspicious and fires Mike Doyle, a ruthless animal trainer whose unwelcome attentions toward June cross the line. Soon after, Pop mysteriously vanishes. Concerned, June implores her sweetheart Pat, a steadfast police detective, to enlist his help in finding him.

He leads Pat through the shadows of the city's underworld to a sinister haunt where Pop is held captive by Doyle's gang. In a tense moment, Pat is attacked by the gang's fierce bulldog and, in the confusion of the darkened room, mistakes the bulldog for him.

At the police station, just as he faces an unjust death sentence, Pop Marlow escapes his captors and arrives in the nick of time to save his loyal dog. Reunited, June, Rinty, and Pat look ahead to a hopeful and happy future.

== Cast ==
- Rin Tin Tin as Rinty
- Audrey Ferris as June
- Carroll Nye as Pat
- Paul Panzer as Mike Doyle
- Otto Hoffman as Pop Marlow

== See also ==
- List of early sound feature films (1926–1929)
