= Slightly Used =

1927 film

- Directed by: Archie Mayo
- Screenplay by: C. Graham Baker; Jack Jarmuth
- Story by: Darryl F. Zanuck
- Starring: May McAvoy; Conrad Nagel; Robert Agnew; Audrey Ferris; Anders Randolf; Eugenie Besserer
- Cinematography: Hal Mohr
- Production company: Warner Bros.
- Distributed by: Warner Bros.
- Release date: September 3, 1927
- Running time: 70 minutes
- Country: United States
- Languages: Sound (Synchronized) (English Intertitles)

Slightly Used is a 1927 American synchronized sound comedy film directed by Archie Mayo and written by C. Graham Baker and Jack Jarmuth. While the film has no audible dialog, it was released with a synchronized musical score with sound effects using the Vitaphone sound-on-disc process. The film stars May McAvoy, Conrad Nagel, Robert Agnew, Audrey Ferris, Anders Randolf and Eugenie Besserer. The film was released by Warner Bros. on September 3, 1927.

The film's plot is based on the 1911 play Green Stockings by A. E. W. Mason. The film was remade as an all-talkie in 1930 as The Flirting Widow at First National Pictures, by then a subsidiary of Warner Bros.

== Plot ==
Cynthia Martin, a spirited and independent 21-year-old, finds herself trapped in a peculiar family tradition. Her father refuses to allow his younger daughters, Helen and Grace, to marry until Cynthia, the eldest, is wed first. He is determined not to let history repeat itself—Aunt Lydia, Cynthia's maiden aunt, was left behind while her younger sisters married off.

Cynthia hasn't met a man she wants to marry, and nor does she want to marry for convenience's sake. Tired of the pressure to get married and wanting to free her sisters for their own engagements, she invents a husband. Pretending to be drunk, she announces to her family that she has just wed a foreign officer, “Major John Smith of Nicaragua,” and her family believes her.

Soon after, Cynthia meets the charming and financially ambitious Donald Woodward (Robert Agnew), and for the first time, love enters the picture. But her imaginary marriage now stands in the way. Hoping to clear the path, Cynthia submits a phony obituary to the New York press, announcing her fictional husband's untimely demise.

To her horror, there is a real Major John Smith in Nicaragua—and he has been receiving her affectionate, if fabricated, letters. Intrigued and amused by the situation, the real Major arrives at the Martin home, introducing himself as “Major Adams,” a friend of the deceased. Cynthia, panicked, tries to maintain her story. Mr. Martin takes an instant liking to the guest and insists he stay in the house, extending the charade to excruciating length for poor Cynthia. This is highly amusing to Smith, who has fallen in love with Cynthia at first sight.

While the Major seems friendly and courteous, Cynthia has no idea whether he knows the truth. One evening, the masquerade comes to a head when the Major boldly enters Cynthia's room and demands his rights as a husband. He reveals his true identity with a glint of mischief. Flustered and cornered, Cynthia confesses everything, explaining that she invented the marriage to help her sisters marry and avoid becoming another Aunt Lydia.

The Major replies that he will accept no excuses with a twinkle in his eye he denounces her as a "murderess" and commands her to go through with the deception —and then delivers his line with mock authority: “Come here to me, woman!” Cynthia, cowed with terror, meekly obeys, only to be surprised by the Major's smiling face and loving embrace. The Major declares: “Just for that you’ve got to marry me.” And Cynthia, already hopelessly in love with the man she thought she'd made up, gladly accepts.

The hoax has become a happy ending, and Cynthia's punishment is the best reward of all—a real marriage, born of make-believe, sealed with genuine affection.

== Cast ==
- May McAvoy as Cynthia Martin
- Conrad Nagel as Major John Smith
- Robert Agnew as Donald Woodward
- Audrey Ferris as Helen Martin
- Anders Randolf as Mr. Martin
- Eugenie Besserer as Aunt Lydia
- Arthur Rankin as Gerald
- David Mir as Horace
- Sally Eilers as Grace Martin
- Jack Santoro as Harold

== See also ==
- List of early sound feature films (1926–1929)
