= Beware of Married Men =

1928 film by Archie Mayo

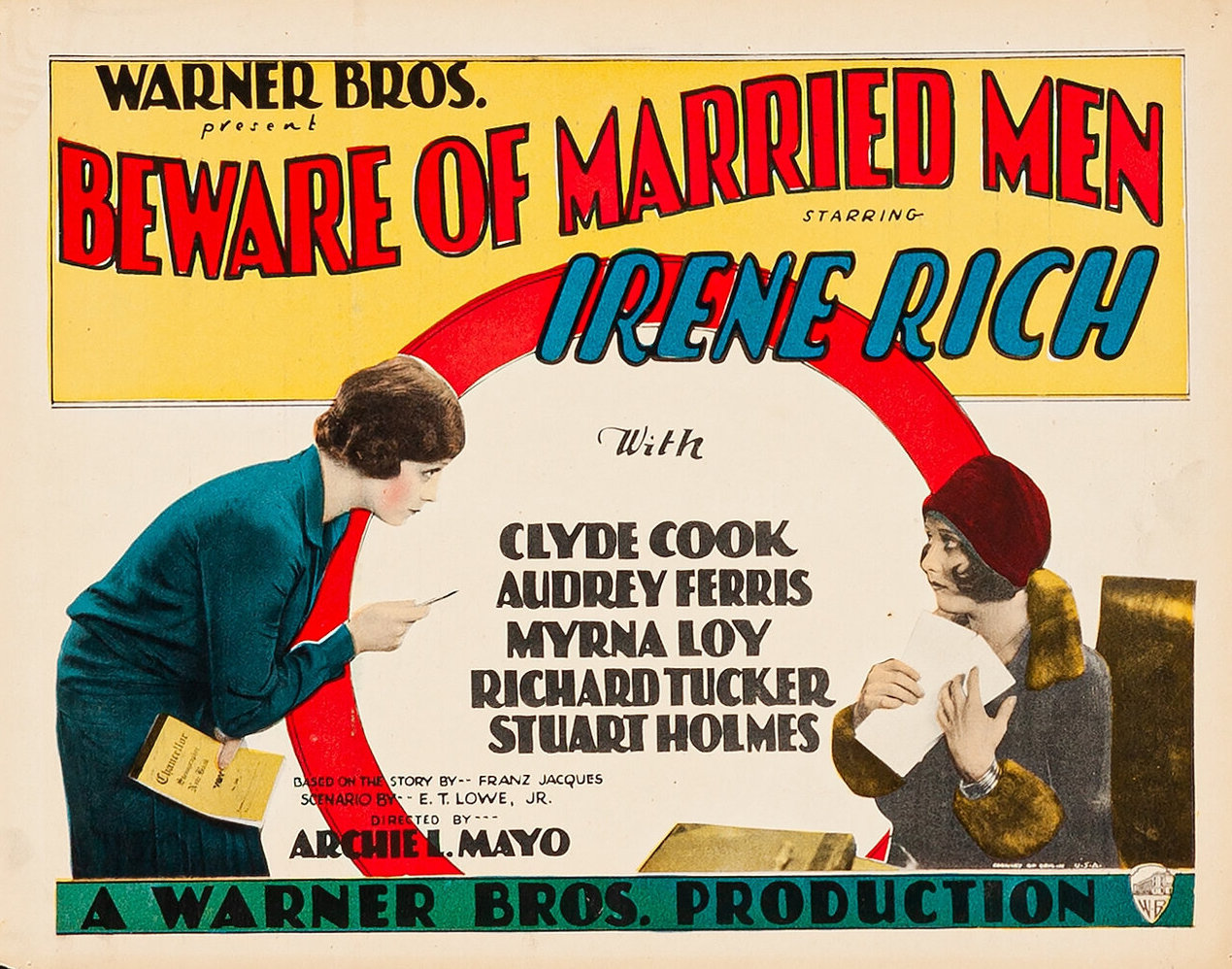
- Lobby card
- Directed by: Archie Mayo
- Written by: Joseph Jackson; Franz Jacques; Edward T. Lowe Jr.
- Starring: Irene Rich; Clyde Cook; Audrey Ferris
- Cinematography: Frank Kesson
- Edited by: Ralph Dawson
- Production company: Warner Bros.
- Distributed by: Warner Bros.
- Release date: January 14, 1928
- Running time: 60 minutes
- Country: United States
- Languages: Sound (Synchronized) (English Intertitles)

Beware of Married Men is a 1928 American synchronized sound comedy film directed by Archie Mayo and starring Irene Rich, Clyde Cook and Audrey Ferris. While the film has no audible dialog, it was released with a synchronized musical score with sound effects using the sound-on-disc Vitaphone process. The film was produced and distributed by Warner Bros. Pictures, Inc.

== Plot ==
Huntley Sheldon, notorious scion of “the divorcing Sheldons,” sets his roving eye on Helene Martin, the innocent younger sister of Myra Martin, who serves as private secretary to high-profile divorce attorney Leonard Gilbert.

When Mrs. Juanita Sheldon hires Gilbert to pursue what will be her fourth divorce, Myra, already wary of Sheldon's behavior from past encounters, takes it upon herself to protect Helene. To ward him off, she disguises herself in an unflattering outfit and adopts the persona of a frumpy social welfare worker. She confronts Sheldon, demanding that he cease his predatory interest in the 17-year-old Helene.

Feigning a heart attack, Sheldon tricks Myra into staying the night to care for his supposedly dying self. By morning, when Myra discovers his deceit, she prepares to leave—only to be caught in an awkward moment by the arrival of Juanita and her bumbling private detective, Botts. Myra's hasty dash for her car is too late; she's been seen, and Sheldon now holds compromising power over her.

Meanwhile, Helene elopes with her earnest boyfriend Ralph, but when she hears of Sheldon's inappropriate advances toward Myra, she decides to turn the tables. She calls Sheldon and arranges to visit his apartment that afternoon—partly as a decoy, partly to defend her sister.

At the same time, Gilbert visits Sheldon to deliver a word of warning. Juanita, having overheard Helene's call thanks to Botts’ snooping, heads straight to the apartment, bringing Myra along. Soon, chaos reigns as Myra, Helene, and Gilbert all end up hiding in different rooms to avoid being discovered.

In a whirlwind of near-misses, comic confusion, and frantic door-slamming, the three narrowly avoid detection—until Myra and Helene reunite and escape the apartment together. Gilbert cleverly explains his own presence as part of an effort to gather evidence on Sheldon's behavior... conveniently in favor of Juanita.

In the end, Juanita—charmed or perhaps just resigned to the circus that is her marriage—decides to keep her flamboyant, philandering husband. Myra and Helene return to calmer waters, having outwitted the Sheldons and their schemes.

== Cast ==
- Irene Rich as Myra Martin
- Clyde Cook as Botts
- Audrey Ferris as Helene Martin
- Myrna Loy as Juanita Sheldon
- Richard Tucker as Leonard Gilbert
- Stuart Holmes as Huntley Sheldon
- Hugh Allan as Ralph

== Preservation ==
The film is presumed lost, however only one reel [4th reel] fragment extant at UCLA Film and Television Archive.

== See also ==
- List of early sound feature films (1926–1929)
