= Women They Talk About =

1928 film by Lloyd Bacon

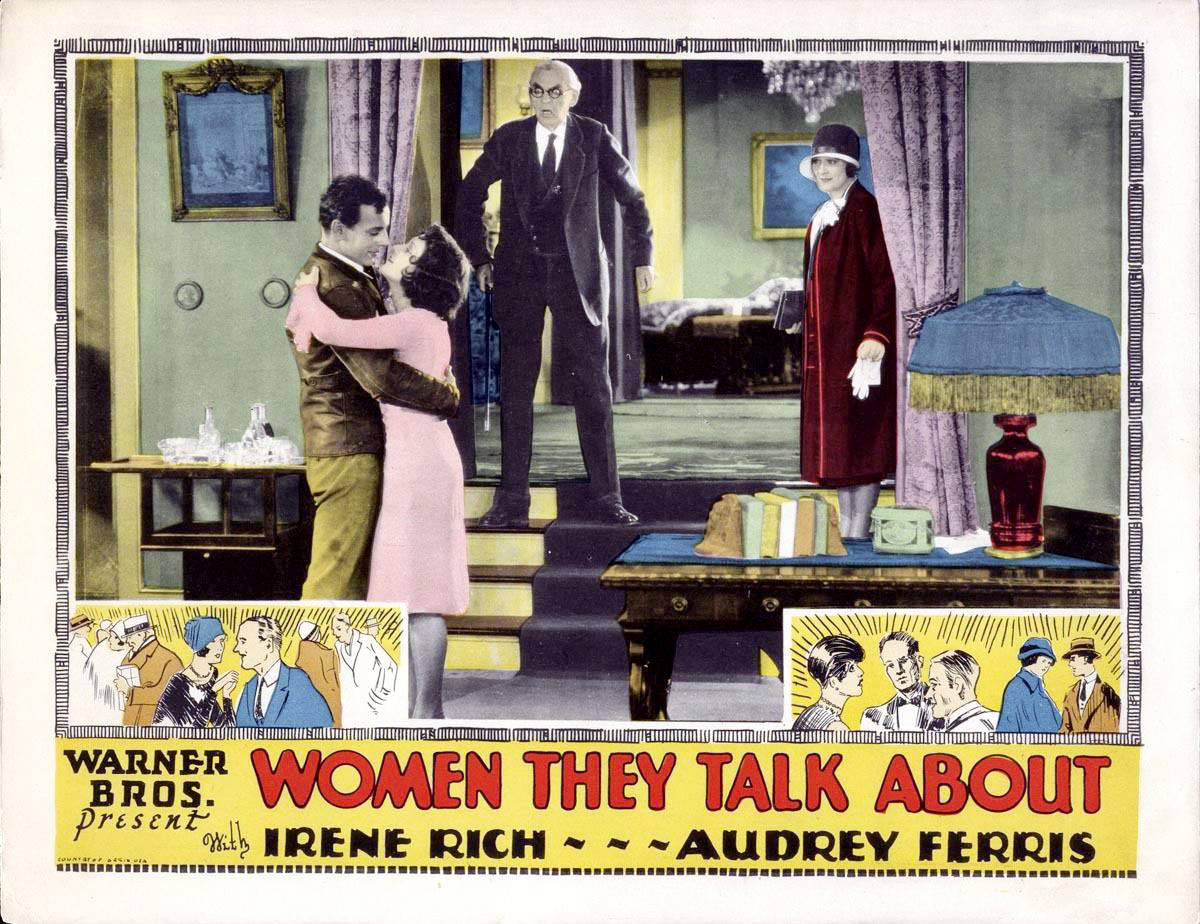
- Lobby card
- Directed by: Lloyd Bacon
- Written by: Robert Lord (scenario & dialogue); Joseph Jackson (titles)
- Story by: Anthony Coldeway
- Starring: Irene Rich; Audrey Ferris
- Cinematography: Frank Kesson
- Edited by: Tommy Pratt
- Production company: Warner Bros. Pictures
- Distributed by: Warner Bros. Pictures
- Release date: August 11, 1928
- Running time: 60 minutes
- Country: United States
- Languages: Sound (Part-Talkie); English Intertitles
- Budget: $79,000
- Box office: $434,000

Women They Talk About is a 1928 American sound part-talkie comedy drama film directed by Lloyd Bacon and starring Irene Rich and Audrey Ferris. In addition to sequences with audible dialogue or talking sequences, the film features a synchronized musical score and sound effects along with English intertitles. According to the film review in Variety, only 14 minutes of the total running time featured dialogue. The soundtrack was recorded using the Vitaphone sound-on-disc system. The film was produced and distributed by Warner Bros. Pictures. It is considered to be a lost film.

== Plot ==
Years ago, John Harrison, then the office boy for wealthy Banker Mervin, fell in love with his employer's daughter, Irene Mervin Hughes. Parental objections won, and Irene married another man and moved abroad. Now grown and serving as mayor, Harrison wages a bitter and cunning political battle against Banker Mervin, demonstrating how politics can level wealth and prestige.

After the death of her husband, Irene returns home with her lively flapper daughter, Audrey Hughes. The Mayor's son, Steve Harrison, falls in love with Audrey, introducing a tender counterpoint to the cutthroat political conflict. As Irene challenges Harrison in the mayoral election, the stakes heighten: Harrison unleashes his police force, and a detective, known as The Frameup Man, hatches a ruthless scheme to compromise Audrey, going far beyond anything Harrison knowingly sanctioned.

Despite the intense political intrigue, broken hearts, and harsh tactics, it is a woman's wit, resilience, and the power of love that ultimately outmatch the men's maneuvers. Cupid intervenes amid the petticoats playing politics, healing old wounds and reuniting estranged hearts. Harrison puts a stop to his scheme as he realizes that he still loves Irene. Irene gives up her ideas about becoming mayor as she comes to the same realization and decides she would be happier as Harrison's wife.

== Cast ==
- Irene Rich as Irene Mervin Hughes
- Audrey Ferris as Audrey Hughes
- William Collier Jr. as Steve Harrison
- Anders Randolf as John Harrison
- Claude Gillingwater as Grandfather Mervin
- Jack Santoro as The Frameup Man
- John Miljan as Policeman

== Box office ==
According to Warner Bros. records, the film earned $366,000 domestically and $68,000 foreign.

== See also ==
- List of lost films
- List of early sound feature films (1926–1929)
