= Fancy Baggage =

1929 film

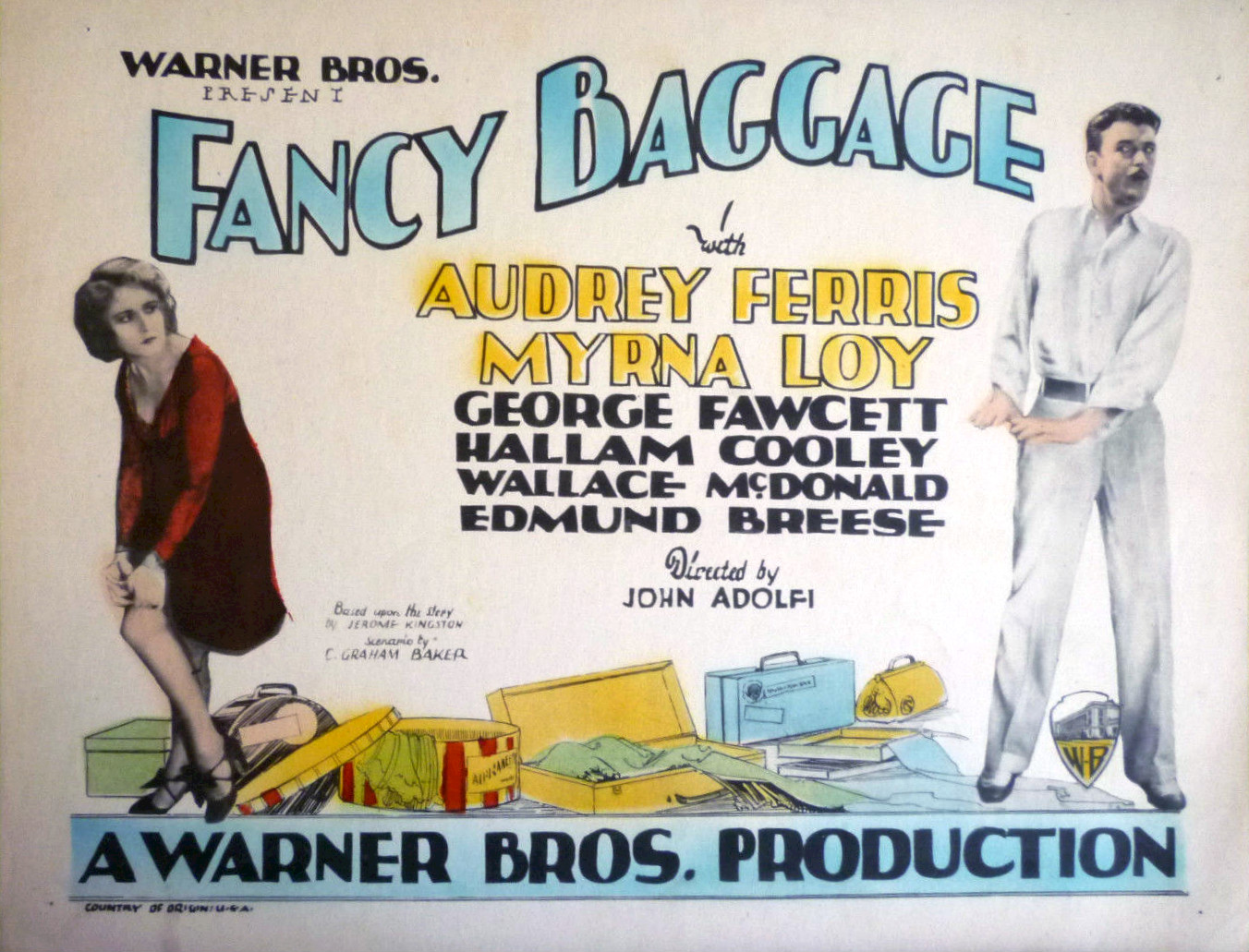
- Lobby card
- Directed by: John G. Adolfi
- Screenplay by: James A. Starr (& titles); C. Graham Baker (& adaptation)
- Story by: Jerome Kingston
- Starring: Audrey Ferris; Myrna Loy; George Fawcett
- Cinematography: William Rees
- Edited by: Owen Marks
- Production company: Warner Bros. Pictures
- Distributed by: Warner Bros. Pictures
- Release dates: January 26, 1929 (sound); February 23, 1929 (silent); (limited release)
- Running time: 80 minutes
- Country: United States
- Languages: Sound (Part-Talkie); English Intertitles

Fancy Baggage is a 1929 American sound part-talkie drama film directed by John G. Adolfi and released by Warner Bros. Pictures. In addition to sequences with audible dialogue or talking sequences, the film features a synchronized musical score and sound effects along with English intertitles. According to the film review in Harrison's Reports, about 30 percent of the total running time featured dialogue. The film used the Vitaphone sound-on-disc system. The film stars Audrey Ferris and Myrna Loy.

== Plot ==
Naomi Iverson, an athletic, carefree girl, is about to start out on another of her continual rounds of young people's parties when she overhears her father and his attorney Austin talking in the library of the Iverson home. She learns that Iverson, in order to secure funds to continue her life of luxury, has assumed the blame for engaging in an illegal stock pool and is to be sentenced by the Federal Government to five years in prison. In return, he has received a check for one million dollars from Hardin, his former partner but now bitterest enemy—though their years-long quarrel began over the trifling fact that one had voted for Bryan and the other for McKinley.

Naomi discovers that her father gave the confession just minutes before to Miss Hickey, Hardin's secretary, who in return handed over Hardin's check to Iverson. By a ruse Naomi learns Miss Hickey's address, and then, going to the library to bid her father goodnight before leaving ostensibly for a party, secretly secures possession of the check and rushes away to secure the return of the confession. She locates Miss Hickey in the bathroom, appropriates her suitcase, and rushes to catch Hardin's yacht, where the secretary is expected to work with her employer over the weekend.

In her hurry, Naomi leaps into a taxi already occupied by the inebriated Dickie. After tricking him out of the cab, she eventually boards the yacht, which only departs after she meets Ernest Hardin, son of Hardin, and discovers Dickie is a friend of Ernest. Cora, who tries to win Ernest's affection, also comes aboard but leaves angrily when she suspects a relationship between Ernest and Naomi. Dickie recognizes Naomi, but craftily keeps silent.

Iverson misses the check and, realizing what Naomi must have done, starts in pursuit of her. Ernest and Naomi have been immediately attracted to each other, but Ernest is hurt by her apparent friendship with Dickie, especially after he discovers her opening with a chisel the drawer where his father placed the confession in a small leather case. Naomi hides the case in her stocking and defiantly dares Ernest to take it.

A gang of rum runners, led by Tony, is discovered by a government cutter but escapes in the dark and ties up alongside the moving yacht. Tony takes charge of the latter, and his men proceed to transfer their liquor to the yacht's deck, intending to take it back after a few hours. Iverson has already succeeded in boarding the yacht at sea, and the quarrel with Hardin is at white heat. Iverson finally discovers Naomi, but by this time Tony has looked upon the girl with covetous eyes and acts. Iverson and Hardin are set adrift in his rum boat. Intent on embracing Naomi, Tony has a fierce fight with Ernest, who is aided by Naomi. However, she is finally cornered by the rum runner, and to escape his clutches, she dives overboard, followed by Ernest. He rescues her and swims to shore with her.

The revenue cutter arrives and arrests the two old men, despite their protests that they are not rum runners. Ernest and Naomi visit their fathers in jail and announce they have been married. The fathers come to terms and become friends. Iverson endorses the million-dollar check over to the young couple, and Ernest tears the confession into bits. The young people admit they are not yet married, but with a wedding present of a million dollars already assured, they will do so at once.

== Cast ==
- Audrey Ferris as Naomi Iverson
- Myrna Loy as Myrna
- George Fawcett as Iverson
- Hallam Cooley as Diuckey
- Wallace MacDonald as Ernest Hardin
- Edmund Breese as John Hardin
- Eddie Gribbon as Steve
- Burr McIntosh as Austin
- Virginia Sale as Miss Hickey

== Preservation status ==
Fancy Baggage is now considered a lost film. Only the soundtrack disc for reel 2 survives. (It is unknown if the sound disc has a talking sequence.)

== See also ==
- List of early sound feature films (1926–1929)
- List of lost films
