= Ginsberg the Great =

1927 film by Byron Haskin

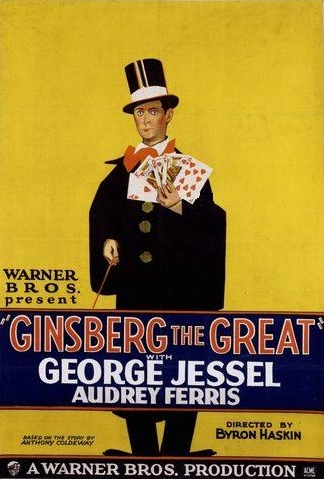
- Theatrical release poster
- Directed by: Byron Haskin
- Written by: Anthony Coldeway (story & scenario)
- Starring: George Jessel; Audrey Ferris; Gertrude Astor
- Cinematography: Conrad Wells
- Edited by: Clarence Kolster
- Production company: The Vitaphone Corp.
- Distributed by: Warner Bros. Pictures
- Release date: November 26, 1927
- Running time: 60 minutes
- Country: United States
- Languages: Sound (Synchronized) (English Intertitles)

Ginsberg the Great is a lost 1927 synchronized sound film starring George Jessel in the period in which he made films with Warner Bros. While the film has no audible dialog, it was released with a synchronized musical score with sound effects using the Vitaphone sound-on-disc process.

Lobby card

== Plot ==
Johnny Ginsberg, a shy but ambitious tailor's apprentice in the quiet town of Sneedville, dreams not of measuring inseams, but of dazzling crowds as a world-famous magician. His illusions may be rough and his sleight-of-hand a little shaky, but one believer fuels his hope—Mary, his devoted sweetheart and the daughter of the tailor. One of the many playing cards in the movie, the one director Byron Haskin thought to represent Ginsberg the most is the Jack of Spades.

When Wheeler's Wonder World, a traveling carnival, rolls into town, Johnny sees his chance to enter showbiz. What he doesn't know is that the troupe is a front for a gang of thieves, led by crooked showman Charles Wheeler. Johnny lands a job as the carnival's jack-of-all-trades—swapping costumes at lightning speed to appear as “Jo-Jo, the Dog-Faced Boy,” “The Bearded Lady,” and other curious attractions.

One night, theatrical impresario Sam Hubert visits the carnival. The gang notices his presence and sends in their trained chimpanzee, Akka, to lift Hubert's wallet. Johnny catches the thieving primate in the act and returns the wallet, earning Hubert's gratitude—and a business card with the promise of a job should Johnny ever reach New York.

Enter Sappho, the carnival's sultry, exotic dancer with ulterior motives. She reads that Hubert has just acquired the famed Russian Crown Jewels. With a fake flirtation, she persuades Johnny to escort her to Hubert's estate. There, with help from the gang, the jewels are stolen. Unbeknownst to all, the "jewels" are paste imitations—yet Hot News Hawkins, Hubert's sensationalist press agent, seizes the story as a publicity windfall and alerts the police.

Back at the carnival, greed erupts as the crooks squabble over their loot. Johnny, learning he's been duped, is enraged. With remarkable resolve, he snatches back the jewels and fends off the gang members one by one—knocking each of them out cold. He tags their limp bodies with notes reading "Honesty is the Best Policy — Ginsberg the Great."

Johnny sets out to return the stolen jewels. Meanwhile, Hubert, Hawkins, and detectives arrive at the carnival to find the gang unconscious and tagged by the amateur magician. Hawkins smells another front-page scoop and proposes that “Ginsberg the Great” headline a major New York tour.

But Johnny, believing his actions have brought shame rather than glory, has fled back to Sneedville. There, Hubert and Hawkins find him and reward his heroism with a $10,000 prize and a contract for top billing on the big-city stage.

Yet amid the applause and career breakthroughs, Johnny's heart remains in Sneedville. As he dons the title “Ginsberg the Great,” he realizes that success means nothing without Mary by his side. She agrees to become Mrs. Ginsberg—completing the magician's happiest illusion of all: love.

== Cast ==
- George Jessel as Johnny Ginsberg
- Audrey Ferris as Mary
- Gertrude Astor as Sappho
- Douglas Gerrard as Sam Hubert
- Jack Santoro as Hawkins
- Theodore Lorch as Charles Wheeler
- Jimmie Quinn as Crook
- Stanley J. Sandford as Hercules
- Akka as a chimpanzee

== See also ==
- Gertrude Astor filmography
- List of early sound feature films (1926–1929)
