= King of the Wild Horses =

King of the Wild Horses may refer to:

- The King of Wild Horses, 1924 American silent Western film directed by Fred Jackman
- King of the Wild Horses (1933 film), American Western directed by Earl Haley
- Rex (horse), nicknamed King of the Wild Horses, an animal actor from the 1924 and 1933 films
- King of the Wild Horses (1947 film), American Western directed by George Archainbaud

== See also ==
- Uchchaihshravas, Hinduism's King of Horses
