= Wonder horses =

Equine companions in Western films

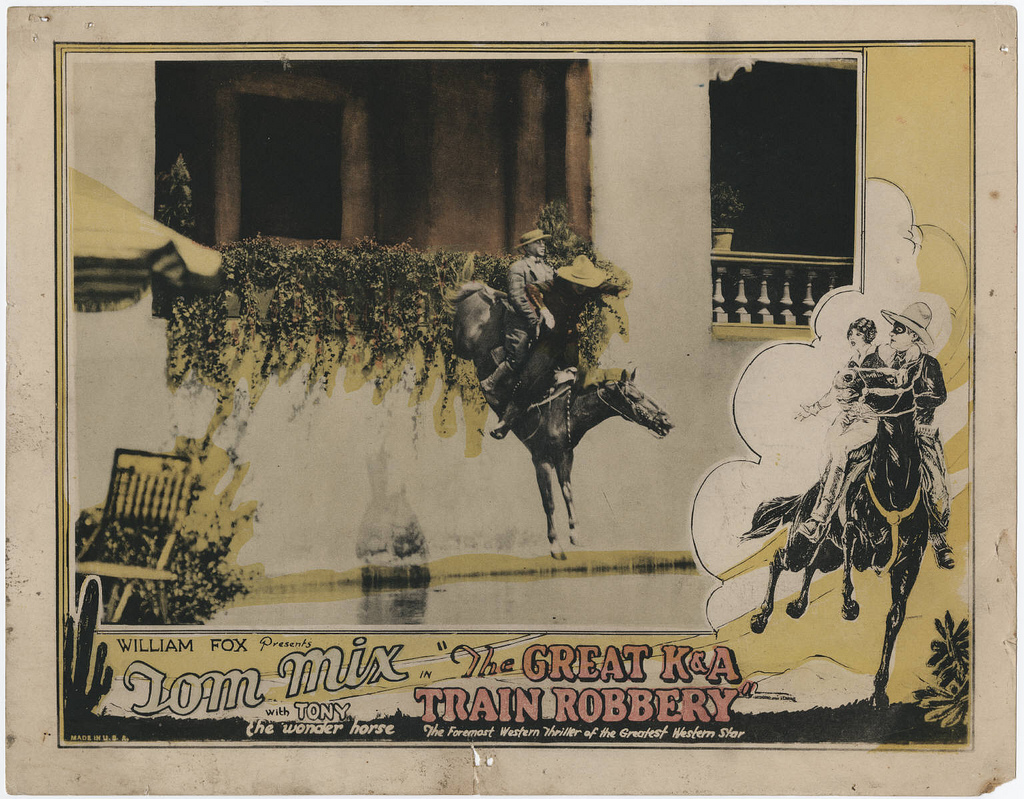
Lobby card for The Great K & A Train Robbery (1926) giving billing to "Tony the wonder horse."

The phrase Wonder Horses refers to the equine companions of cowboy heroes in early Western films. What makes these horses different from others that have appeared on the silver screen is their rise from trusty steed to a genuine screen personality. A number of horses have enjoyed such fame, often receiving equal or second billing with their human costars.

== Heroic horses of the silver screen ==
Though the first heroic horses emerged from the silent film era, they were prominently featured in the B-Westerns of the 1930s, 1940s, and 1950s. During the early decades of sound film, cowboy movies targeted a juvenile demographic. The film's heroes were generally one-dimensional, stock characters, who represented and promoted truth and goodness to their young audience. More popular with adolescent viewers than a human sidekick, the Wonder Horse could not only outrun the mounts of the villains, but could also perform a series of feats and tricks to ensure that the cowboy hero would triumph.

The bond between a cowboy and his horse is an important part of the cowboy mythology created by dime novels, pulp fiction stories, and Western cinema. Movies featuring Wonder Horses embellish this relationship between man and beast while heightening the exceptional and heroic qualities of the cowboy by his association with a remarkable animal.

=== Fritz ===
Fritz with William S. Hart and Mary Thurman in the film Sand!

Fritz was the first horse to be named in the credits as a costar to his rider, William S. Hart, appearing in at least eight silent films: Pinto Ben (1915), Hell’s Hinges (1916), The Narrow Trail (1917), Blue Blazes Rawden (1918), The Toll Gate (1920), Sand (1920), Three Word Brand (1921), and Singer Jim McKee (1924). He received his own fan mail, which often included sugar cubes from admirers.

During his career, Fritz was much beloved by his costar, actor William Hart. The horse belonged to film producer Thomas Ince, but during a raise negotiation with Ince, Hart was able to acquire ownership of Fritz. Fritz was known for his ability to do unique and risky stunts. He could jump into moving rivers, through windows, over fire, and "allow himself to be thrown to the ground after a sudden stop." In his autobiography, Hart speaks lovingly of Fritz, and describes some of their stunts together. One in particular illustrates the danger of the stunts Fritz performed and the love Hart felt for his "pinto pony". While filming a scene for the 1920 film The Toll Gate, Hart and Fritz were caught in a whirlpool:

Once an animal got into it, he could neither swim out nor climb out. There was no bottom for his hind legs to reach and he could only get his front hoofs on the ledge which was six feet under water. Almighty God! How Fritz did try! He struggled. He screamed. He looked at me with the eyes of a human being. He actually climbed the arched side walls until he turned himself over backwards. Twice we went down in those cold, whirling depts and twice we fought our way to the surface again. I knew the next time would be the last. Fritz spoke to me—I know he did. I heard him, and I spoke to him. I said, "God help us, Fritz." ... And God did help us! My little friend could not struggle any more, his eyes were glazed with coming death, and as we were going down for the last time the strong current we had been fighting carried us over the ledge back toward the way we cam in, and as we sank we touched the bottom and regained our feet.

After his retirement from film, Fritz lived out the rest of his 31 years at Hart's California ranch. His grave is marked by a cobblestone monument that reads: “Bill Hart's Pinto Pony Fritz—Aged 31 Years—A Loyal Comrade”.

=== Tony ===
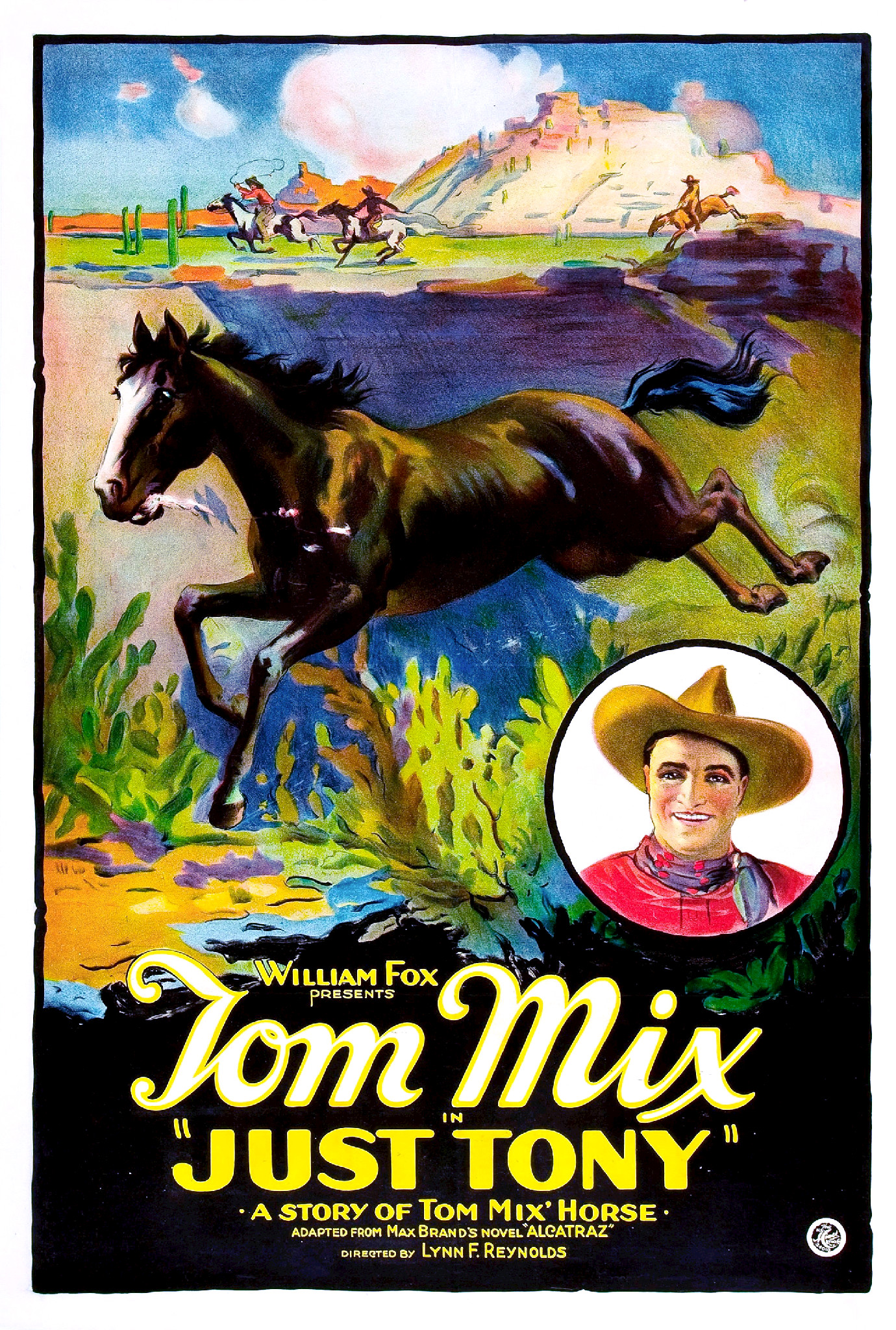
Poster for Just Tony (1922)

Tom Mix and Tony performing at the National Capital Horse Show (May 21, 1925)

The first horse to bear the name “The Wonder Horse”, Tony was the companion of actor Tom Mix. He starred in over two dozen silent and sound films during his career, becoming a celebrity in his own right. When Mix placed his handprints in the concrete outside Grauman's Chinese Theatre in 1927, Tony’s hoofprints were placed alongside them. He was the first horse to be given equal billing with his human costar, and was featured in the title of three movies: Just Tony (1922), Oh! You Tony (1924), and Tony Runs Wild (1926). Tony is listed as appearing in 34 films between 1922 and 1932. Just Tony is based on a Max Brand novel, Alcatraz. Tony's image appeared on film posters, his name was included in a number of film titles, and he accompanied Mix on international publicity tours. Tony was immortalized in a series of junior novels and comic books, including the 1934 children's book Tony and his Pals. Tony was famous in part because Mix, the film industry, and the media were able to anthropomorphize him. In the films, his horseness was continually reaffirmed; at the same time, so was his ability to understand language, what was going on around him. Tony is most known for his intelligence and ability to perform remarkable stunts, many of which would not be allowed today due to the danger involved. Tony performed in the years before the American Humane Association oversaw the use of animals on American productions. Since animals cannot verbalize agreement to be actors, the American Humane Association began to oversee how animal labor was created, filmed, and commercialized in 1940, eight years after Tony's retirement.

Tony was a naturally gaited Tennessee Pacer or Walking horse. He received his initial breaking and gait training from Kentucky trainer Tom Brinley. A later owner, Pat Chrisman, further trained him for tricks and stunts, then sold him to Tom Mix.

Mix reportedly did not have to train Tony, but simply show him what to do for each feat. Mix could convey any sort of message to the pony by touches of the hand or fingers on Tony's neck, although speculation existed that whips, strong bits, and spurs were used. Such stunts included untying Mix’s hands, opening gates, jumping over high fences, getting tangled in ropes, loosening his reins, rescuing Mix from fire, jumping from one cliff to another, and running after trains. In the 1926 film The Great K & A Train Robbery (Fox Film Corporation), Mix jumps Tony through a glass window into a building and rides him alongside a speeding train. In the film Trailin' (1921) Mix and Tony have a bridge slashed from under them, and uncut footage shows the pair tipping over to the river below.

Besides film, Tony was also in the Sells Floto Circus with Tom Mix as his rider. A program from the circus in 1931 made a statement about the bond between the pair:

Every patron of the motion picture theater knows Tom Mix and his wonder horse Tony, who for years have been almost inseparable ... Tom is the only master Tony ever had and the only person who has been on his back, which may partly account for their extreme love for each other.

— Paul E. Mix, The Life and Legend of Tom Mix

Tony retired from the film industry in 1932 at the age of 22, when he was slightly injured on the set of his last movie, The Fourth Horseman (1932). Following Tony's retirement, Tom Mix began featuring another horse of similar color and appearance in his films, Tony, Jr. A third horse, Tony II, was used for public appearances.

After Mix was killed in a car accident in 1940, Tony was cared for by Mix's attorney and friend, horseman Ivon D. Parker. Tony died in 1942, at the age of 40. The horse had been in decline and was euthanized.

=== Rex ===
Known as “The Wonder Horse” and “King of the Wild Horses”, Rex was a black Morgan stallion with a fierce reputation. Despite the fact that over the years he was termed “mean”, “vicious”, “ornery”, “undependable”, “warped”, and “dangerous”, Rex was in the film industry for nearly 15 years, starring in over a dozen films. Few actors were willing to work with the wild horse, so a double was often used in close-ups. He was the first horse to star in his own films.

Rex appeared in such silent and sound films as The King of the Wild Horses (1924), The Devil Horse (1926), No Man's Law (1927), King of the Wild Horses (1933), The Law of the Wild (1934), The Adventures of Rex and Rinty (1935), and King of the Sierras (1938).

Rex was very often the star of these films, bringing comedy and action to the screen. In one scene from No Man's Law, Rex saves the modesty of a young woman swimming in the nude from a pair of rowdy villains. Chasing one around in circles, rearing and bucking like a wild mustang, until he finally runs him off of a cliff, he sneaks up behind the other and nudges him with his nose over the ledge and into the watering hole. He then nose prods the now clothed young woman back to her father.

=== Tarzan ===
Tarzan, the Wonder Horse, was the onscreen companion to silent and sound film star Ken Maynard. Together, they starred in over 60 films and serials from 1925 until Tarzan's death in 1940.

While previous Wonder Horses had been used by their cowboy costars to perform stunts, actor Ken Maynard was the first to use a horse for its tricks. While Tarzan could perform stunts like jumping off cliffs, he was known better for his tricks, such as dancing, bowing, nodding his head to answer questions, playing dead, untying ropes, dragging Maynard to safety, or nuzzling him into the arms of the leading lady. Tarzan performed these stunts in response to word commands from Maynard.

=== Champion ===
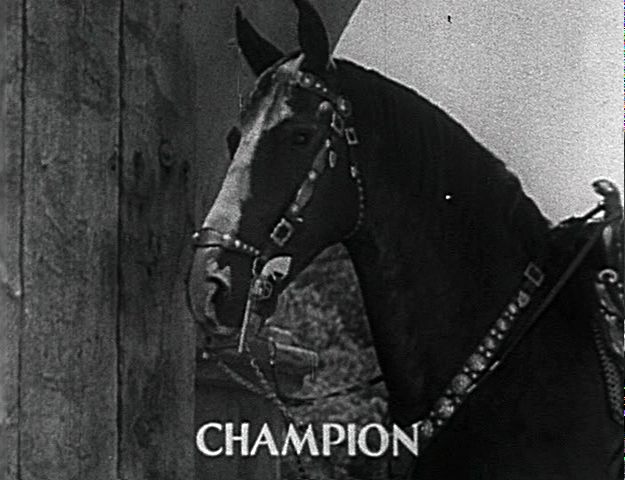
Champion named in the film Oh, Susanna!

Champion, the Wonder Horse, was the onscreen companion of the singing cowboy Gene Autry. Originally belonging to Tom Mix, Autry likely purchased Champion after working with him in The Phantom Empire series. Several horses bore the name Champion; the first died while Autry was serving in the Army Air Force during World War II.

Champion was able to perform numerous tricks, including jumping through paper-covered hoops and galloping toward and coming to a stop atop a piano. Gene Autry and Champion (probably Champion II) left their handprints and hoofprints in the cement outside Grauman's Chinese Theatre in 1949.

Champion (and his successors) appeared in nearly 100 films and television shows from the 1930s through the 1950s. A star in his own right, Champion was featured in his own television series, The Adventures of Champion, based on a radio series of the same name. Lyrics from the theme song emphasize his status as Wonder Horse.

Like a streak of lightnin' flashin' 'cross the sky,
Like the swiftest arrow whizzin' from a bow,
Like a mighty cannonball he seems to fly.
You'll hear about him ever'where you go.
The time'll come when everyone will know
The name of Champion the Wonder Horse!

=== Trigger ===
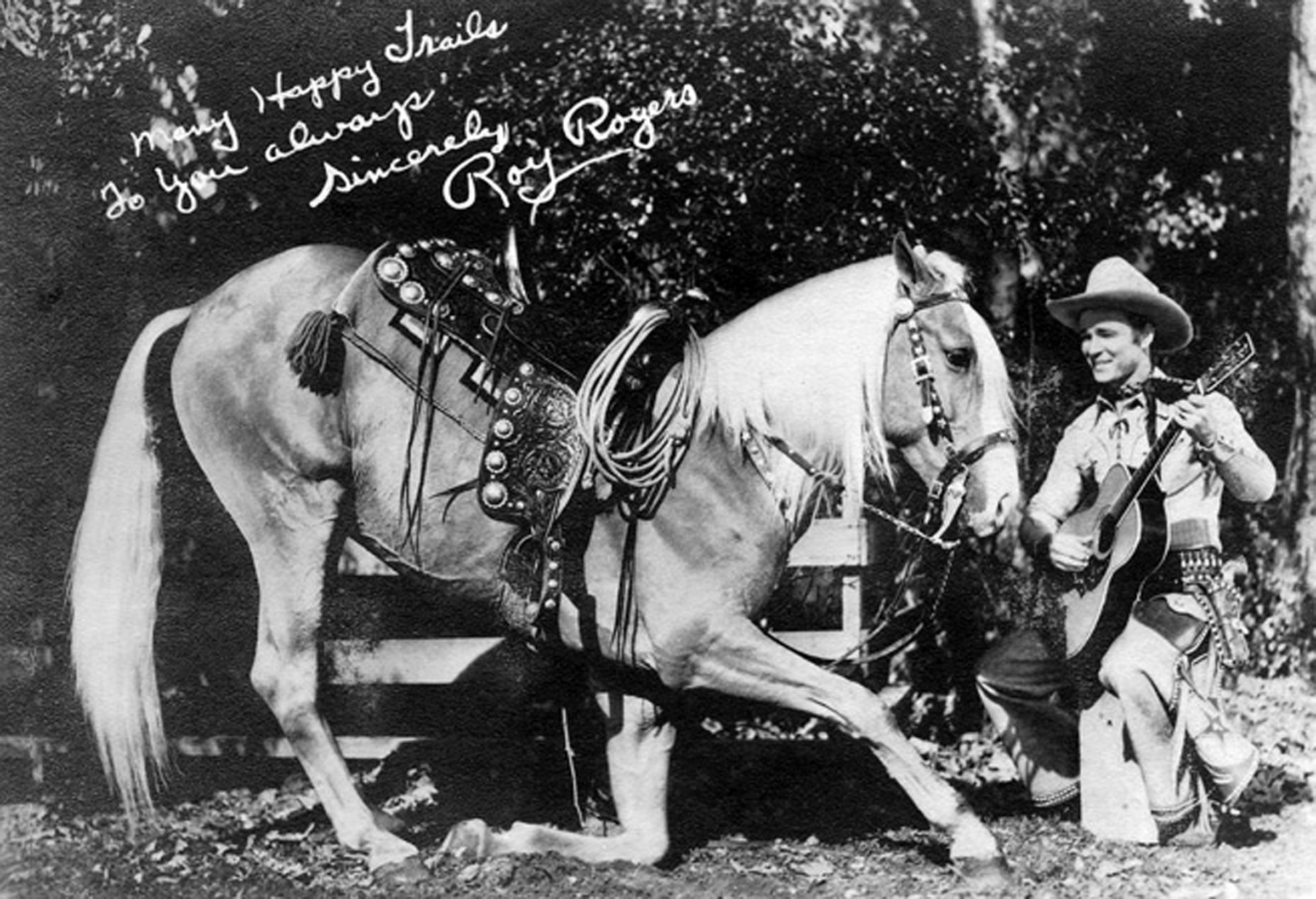
Publicity photo of Roy Rogers and Trigger

One of the most well-known Wonder Horses was Roy Rogers' palomino stallion, Trigger. He appeared in all 81 of Rogers' films and 101 television shows. He retired from show business in 1957, dying in 1965 at the age of 33; he was stuffed and the taxidermy mount resided at the Roy Rogers Museum in California and then in Branson, Missouri, until its closure. On July 14, 2010, Trigger was sold in auction at Christie's New York Saleroom to Patrick Gottsch, who plans to display the mount at the corporate headquarters of his network, RFD-TV, in Omaha, Nebraska.

Trigger was billed as "The Smartest Horse in the Movies". His trainer, Glen Randall, described him as being "almost human", knowing as many as 60 different tricks. Like Tarzan, many of his tricks were performed by word cue. One of his more exceptional "tricks" was that he was housebroken, allowing Roy Rogers to make public appearances with him. During a trip to New York City, Trigger reportedly delighted audiences by dancing, rearing, pawing, and playing dead on the ballroom floor of the Hotel Astor.

Like Tony, more than one horse bore the name Trigger. Little Trigger and Trigger, Jr. were also used for public appearances, film, and television to lessen the strain and stress on the original Trigger. Rogers and Trigger placed their hands and hooves in the concrete at Grauman's Chinese Theatre in 1949. His counterpart was Buttermilk, the horse of Roy Roger's wife, actress and singing cowgirl star Dale Evans.

== Other notable Wonder Horses ==
- Baron with Tom Tyler
- Black Jack and Feather with Allan Lane
- Cyclone with Don Barry
- Duke with John Wayne
- Falcon with Buster Crabbe
- King with Bill Cody
- Knight with Rod Cameron
- Koko "The Miracle Horse of the Movies" with Rex Allen
- Lightning and Duke with Tim Holt
- Midnight with Tim McCoy
- Mike with George O’Brien
- Mutt with Hoot Gibson
- Raider with Charles Starrett
- Rebel with Reb Russell
- Rush with Lash LaRue
- Scout with Jack Hoxie
- Shamrock with Bob Livingstone
- Silver with Buck Jones
- Silver with the Lone Ranger
- Silver with Sunset Carson
- Silver Bullet with Whip Wilson
- Silver King with Fred Thomson
- Sonny and Thunder with Wild Bill Elliott
- Starlight with Jack Perrin
- Tarzan with Ken Maynard
- Topper with Hopalong Cassidy
- White Eagle and Silver with Buck Jones
- White Flash with Tex Ritter

== Wonder Horse toys ==
As these Westerns had great appeal to children, toys, clothing, and other accessories were marketed, many of them featuring their favorite cowboy's Wonder Horse. Tony, Trigger, Champion, Rocky Lane's Black Jack, and the Lone Ranger's Silver were some of the Wonder Horses of cinema that were featured in Western comic books.

== Modern Wonder Horses ==
- Comet with Bruce Campbell on The Adventures of Brisco County, Jr.

== See also ==
- List of historical horses
