= King of the Wild Horses (1947 film) =

1947 film directed by George Archainbaud

- Directed by: George Archainbaud
- Screenplay by: Brenda Weisberg
- Story by: Ted Thomas
- Produced by: Ted Richmond
- Starring: Preston Foster; Gail Patrick; Billy Sheffield
- Cinematography: George Meehan (as George B. Meehan Jr.); Philip Tannura
- Edited by: Henry Batista
- Production company: Columbia Pictures
- Distributed by: Columbia Pictures
- Release date: March 29, 1947
- Running time: 79 minutes
- Country: United States
- Language: English

King of the Wild Horses is a 1947 American Western film, directed by George Archainbaud and starring: Preston Foster, Gail Patrick and Billy Sheffield. Although the film shares its title with earlier films released in 1933 and 1924, it is not a remake.

== Plot ==
The film centers on a young city boy, named Billy, who heads out to the Old West to live on a ranch and bonds with a wild horse, named Royal.

== Cast ==
- Preston Foster as Dave Taggert
- Gail Patrick as Ellen Taggert
- Billy Sheffield as Tim Taggert (as Bill Sheffield)
- Guinn "Big Boy" Williams as Jed Acker (as Big Boy Williams)
- Patti Brady as Lolly Taggert
- Charles Kemper as Rudy
- Robert 'Buzz' Henry as Cracker (as Buzz Henry)
- John Kellogg as Danny Taggert
- Ruth Warren as Jane Acker
- Louis Faust as Tex

== See also ==
- List of American films of 1947
