= From Headquarters =

From Headquarters may refer to:

- From Headquarters (1929 film), an American part-talkie adventure drama
- From Headquarters (1933 film), an American murder mystery
