= Norma Taylor =

American actress, dancer, and showgirl

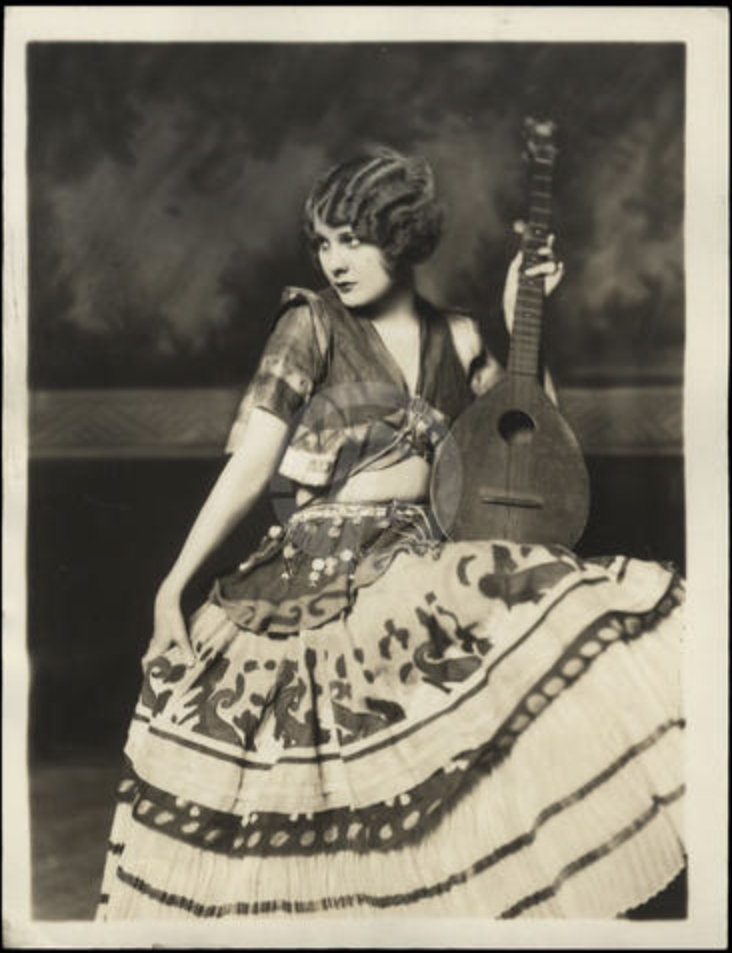
- Taylor about 1927
- Born: Evelyn Ruth Shepard; 1908; Omaha, Nebraska, U.S.
- Died: June 5, 1983 (aged 75); Tampa, Florida, U.S.
- Occupations: Actress; dancer; showgirl
- Years active: 1926–1938
- Spouses: Robert S. Taylor, 1923–?; William Newton Duryea, 1931–1931; Charles A. Adams, 1945–1983

Norma Taylor (born Evelyn Ruth Shepard) was an American dancer and showgirl.

== Early years ==
Norma Taylor was born to Harrison Milton Shepard and his wife, Nina Olivia (Rosengren) Shepard in Omaha, NE.

In 1925, Taylor joined the chorus of a traveling show. That same year, she won a beauty contest at a Chicago Park and was declared "the most beautiful blonde in Chicago." Shortly afterward, Producer Charles Dillingham added Taylor to the Chicago run of the musical comedy Sonny.

== Broadway career ==
In 1926, Taylor joined the cast of Sonny as a dancer on Broadway. Soon after, Florenz Ziegfeld, Jr. cast Taylor as a dancer in the musical Rio Rita. Ziegfeld next engaged her for The Ziegfeld Follies of 1927.

Taylor enjoyed continuing success as a dancer in Broadway musicals with roles in She's My Baby (1928), Smiles (1930–1931), and The New Yorkers (1930–1931). Her last Broadway show was Here Goes the Bride (1931).

Apart from her roles in staged musicals, Taylor also danced for entertainment in various nightclubs, including Texas Guinan's notorious speakeasies. She was a member of Guinan's traveling Whoopee Girls revue when French authorities banned the troupe from entering the country. Nevertheless, Taylor and another dancer slipped away to enjoy a forbidden night in Paris, a caper that received worldwide press attention.

== Film career ==
Taylor had roles in several Hollywood B movies. Her credits include:

- The Girl Habit (1931)
- Poppin' the Cork (1933)
- Coronado (1935)
- Waterfront Lady (1935)
- The Girl Friend (1935)
- Tumbling Tumbleweeds (1935)
- The Adventures of Rex and Rinty (1935)
- I Demand Payment (1938)

== Personal life ==
Taylor married Robert S. Taylor, a Piggly-Wiggly supermarket employee, while on the road in Memphis, TN. She was arrested for marrying at 16 but was released at her husband's insistence. Little more is known about the marriage, but the couple appear to have separated in short order.

In October 1926, rumors spread on Broadway that Taylor was first engaged to, and then married, Tommy Guinan, brother of impresario and nightclub hostess Texas Guinan. The rumors persisted for years until the moment in 1931 when Tommy Guinan presented Taylor with "a $15,000 diamond bracelet" as an engagement gift, only to see her marry William Newton Duryea, a nightclub owner, three months later. The marriage lasted ten days before Taylor demanded a divorce, telling reporters, “Being married made it much harder for me to get a job. Everybody seemed to think I didn’t need help when I had a husband to fall back on. But, my husband couldn’t support me, so I lost out all around.”

Taylor quickly moved on to a "red hot love affair" with Millionaire playboy Tommy Manville, who would go on to set a Guinness world record of 13 marriages (Taylor was not one of his brides). In 1933, Mrs. Muriel Young Hutchins named Taylor in a divorce suit against her husband, drama coach John Hutchins. The drama played out for months in the national press, with Taylor labeled a "Love Thief" and "Love Pirate."

In 1935, Taylor was again headline news for months regarding her alleged romance with surgeon Franklyn Thorpe, who was recently divorced from Mary Astor. In a custody battle over the child of Thorpe and Astor, details emerged of an alcohol-fueled "bathroom brawl" between Taylor and Dr. Thorpe. Police found the two sprawled on a bathroom floor after what Dr. Thorpe termed "a tussle."

The legal battle also unearthed allegations that Taylor stabbed Dr. Thorpe twice with a turkey fork. Taylor denied everything, including the fork-stabbing incident. "Ha, Ha! That's a good one! I don't even eat turkey," she said. Appearing in court reportedly caused Taylor to "collapse" and forced her to check into a sanitarium.

One theory about why Taylor was so distraught is that "every Hollywood contract had a morals clause stipulating that performers conduct themselves in a manner not in conflict with accepted public morality. In 1936, sleeping with a man sans a marriage license fell under that provision, meaning that [Taylor] might never work in films again." In any event, soon after her court appearance, she found refuge at the home of former beau Tommy Manville, who was then married to his fourth wife, Marcelle Edwards, a showgirl with The Earl Carroll Vanities.

== Later years ==
Given her tumultuous past, Taylor led a surprisingly quiet life after leaving the entertainment world. In 1958, a newspaper reported she married Charles A. Adams, owner of a busy Tampa, FL gas station. She was described as "a pert little woman in a tan pedal-pusher uniform" who "bustles from car to car washing wind-shields, changing oil, [and] pouring gas." Taylor said she met Adams during World War II while working in a New York defense plant. They married in 1945 and moved to Tampa in 1949. She claimed to have used her many diamond rings and bracelets as collateral for a loan to buy the gas station.

Taylor died in 1983.
