= The Million Dollar Collar =

1929 film by D. Ross Lederman

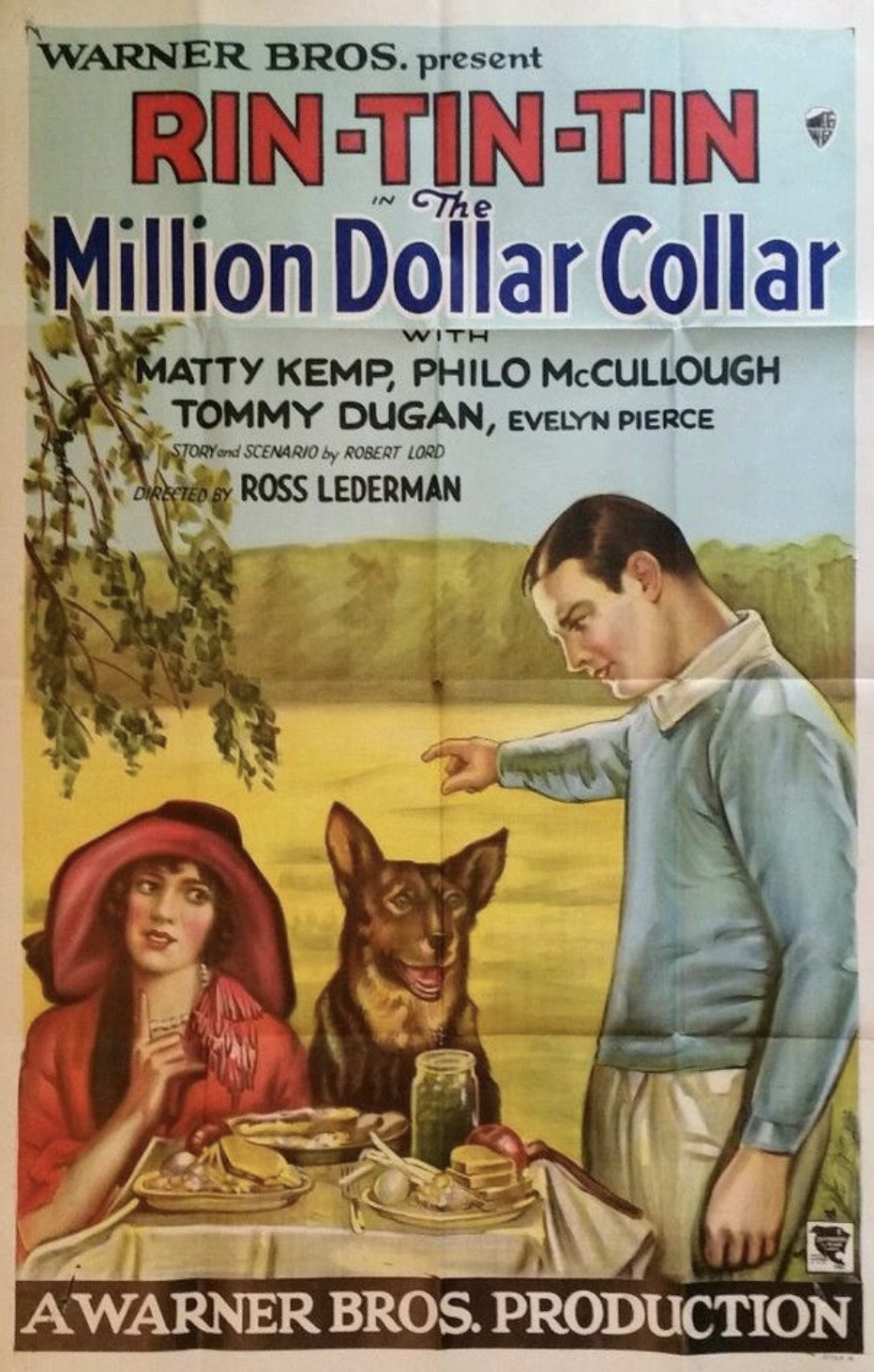
- Theatrical release poster
- Directed by: D. Ross Lederman
- Written by: James A. Starr (titles)
- Screenplay by: Robert Lord
- Story by: Robert Lord
- Starring: Rin Tin Tin
- Production company: Warner Bros. Pictures
- Distributed by: Warner Bros. Pictures
- Release date: February 9, 1929 (limited)
- Running time: 62 minutes
- Country: United States
- Languages: Sound (Part-Talkie) (English Intertitles)
- Budget: $62,000
- Box office: $312,000

The Million Dollar Collar is a 1929 American sound part-talkie crime film directed by D. Ross Lederman. In addition to sequences with audible dialogue or talking sequences, the film features a synchronized musical score and sound effects along with English intertitles. The soundtrack was recorded using the Vitaphone sound-on-disc system. The film is in unknown status which suggests that it may be lost. According to Warner Bros. records, this film, which cost $62,000 to make, earned $222,000 domestically and $90,000 foreign.

== Plot ==
When young Bill Holmes rescues a battered dog named Rinty from the wreckage of a getaway car driven by gangster Ed Mack, he unwittingly steps into a perilous game of mistaken identity. Donning Ed's clothes for warmth, Bill heads for nearby Pine Lodge, unaware that hidden inside Rinty's collar is a stolen diamond necklace worth $50,000.

At Pine Lodge, Joe French, a ruthless gang leader, mistakes Bill for Ed Mack and begins sniffing around for the missing loot. His sister Mary, also a member of the gang but sickened by a life of crime, sees something different in Bill. Drawn to his decency and honesty, she quickly falls in love. The two plan to elope, hoping to escape both the gang's clutches and Joe's fury—especially after Joe realizes Mary has spurned him for his supposed rival.

In a friendly tussle, Rinty's collar comes loose and Bill discovers the hidden treasure. But before he can act, Ed Mack arrives with the Chief and Scar, members of the larger gang. Bill is given the third degree. He tries to lie, claiming he threw the collar away, but the diamond necklace is found in his pocket. The gang prepares to kill him.

At that very moment, Mary unbolts the door. Rinty, springing into action with fearless precision, causes the gunman's shot to go wild. Bill, Mary, and Rinty escape on horseback, with the gang in hot pursuit. They take refuge in a cave, only for the criminals to set a fire, trying to smoke them out. With flames rising, Rinty braves life-taking danger—leaping through smoke and flame to carry a desperate note to safety.

Meanwhile, the Chief and Ed run straight into a patrol of rough-and-ready rangers tracking their stolen horses. A fierce gun battle ends with the gang's arrest, their crime wave finally foiled by Rinty, the avenging genius of the tale.

With the necklace recovered, Bill and Mary receive a generous reward. As they set out on their honeymoon, Rinty—loyal, brave, and ever watchful—trots at their side, a true super-dog whose cunning and heart turned the tide.

== Cast ==
- Rin Tin Tin as Rinty, a dog
- Matty Kemp as Bill Holmes
- Evelyn Pierce as Mary French
- Philo McCullough as Joe French
- Tom Dugan as Ed Mack
- Allan Cavan as Chief
- Grover Ligon as Scar

== See also ==
- List of early sound feature films (1926–1929)
