= Wild Blood (1928 film) =

1928 film

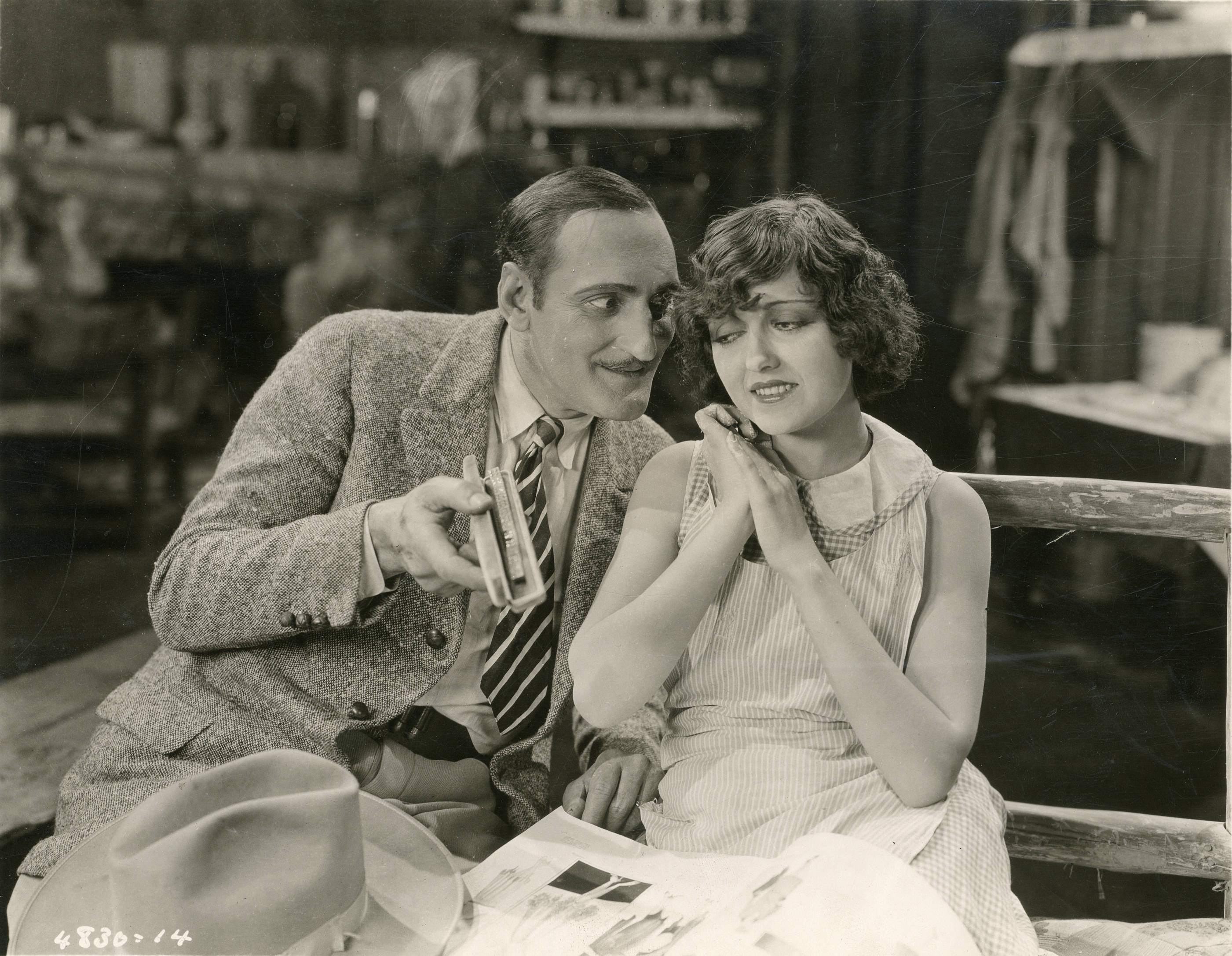
- Directed by: Henry MacRae
- Written by: Gardner Bradford; George Morgan
- Produced by: Carl Laemmle
- Starring: Jack Perrin; Ethlyne Clair; Theodore Lorch
- Cinematography: George Robinson
- Edited by: Tom Malloy
- Production company: Universal Pictures
- Distributed by: Universal Pictures
- Release date: April 8, 1928
- Running time: 50 minutes
- Country: United States
- Languages: Silent; English intertitles

Wild Blood is a 1928 American silent Western film directed by Henry MacRae and starring Jack Perrin, Ethlyne Clair and Theodore Lorch.

== Cast ==
- Rex as Rex, Mary's Horse
- Jack Perrin as Jack Crosby
- Ethlyne Clair as Mary Ellis
- Theodore Lorch as Luke Conner
- Nelson McDowell as John Ellis

== Bibliography ==
- Rainey, Buck. Sweethearts of the Sage: Biographies and Filmographies of 258 actresses appearing in Western movies. McFarland & Company, 1992.
