= The Vanishing Rider =

1928 film

- Directed by: Ray Taylor
- Written by: Carl Krusada; George H. Plympton; William Lord Wright
- Starring: William Desmond; Ethlyne Clair; Boris Karloff
- Distributed by: Universal Pictures
- Release date: January 16, 1928
- Running time: 12 episodes
- Country: United States
- Languages: Silent; English intertitles

The Vanishing Rider is a 1928 American silent Western film serial directed by Ray Taylor and featuring William Desmond and Ethlyne Clair. Boris Karloff was also in the cast. The film is now considered to be lost.

== Cast ==
- William Desmond as Jim Davis / The Vanishing Rider
- Ethlyne Clair as Mary Allen
- Nelson McDowell as Pop Smith
- Bud Osborne as Butch Bradley
- Boris Karloff as The Villain

== See also ==
- List of film serials
- List of film serials by studio
- Boris Karloff filmography
