= Painted Ponies =

1927 film

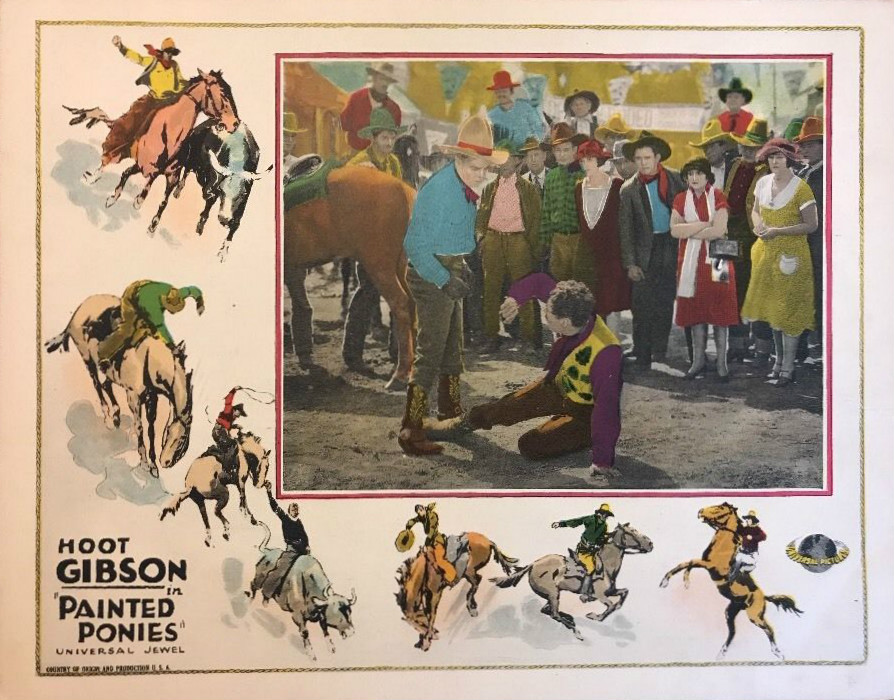
- Directed by: B. Reeves Eason
- Written by: Arthur Statter; Frank Beresford; Tom Reed(titles)
- Story by: John Harold Hamlin
- Produced by: Carl Laemmle
- Starring: Hoot Gibson
- Cinematography: Harry Neumann
- Distributed by: Universal Pictures
- Release date: September 25, 1927
- Running time: 6 reels
- Country: United States
- Languages: Silent; English intertitles

Painted Ponies is a lost 1927 American silent Western film directed by B. Reeves Eason and starring Hoot Gibson. It was produced and distributed by Universal Pictures.

== Cast ==
- Hoot Gibson as Bucky Simms
- William R. Dunn as Pinto Pete (credited as William Dunn)
- Charles Sellon as Mr. Blenning
- Otto Hoffman as Jim
- Ethlyne Clair as Pony Blenning
- Slim Summerville as Beanpole
- Chief White Spear
- Black Hawk
- Chief John Big Tree
- Mary Lopez

== Censorship ==
Before Painted Ponies could be exhibited in Kansas, the Kansas Board of Review required the elimination of all three instances of thumbing noses.
