= Rob Eden =

American writer duo (1892–1947)

Rob Eden (1892–1947) was the nom de plume of American fiction writer Robert Ferdiand Burkhardt and his wife Eve. Several of his stories were adapted to film in the 1930s. Burkhardt worked at various newspapers before working as a publicist in Hollywood. He also wrote mysteries using the pseudonyms Adam Bliss and Rex Jardin.

Burkhardt was born in Altoona, Iowa.

== Bibliography ==
- Second Chance (1932)
- Dancing Feet
- In Love With a T-Man
- Love or Money
- Modern Marriage
- Short Skirts: A Story of Modern Youth
- Always in Her Heart
- Blond Trouble
- Fickle
- The Girl With Red Hair
- Golden Goddess
- Heartbreak Girl
- Her Dream Prince
- Her Fondest Hope
- In Love With a T-Man
- Jennifer Hale
- Kathie the First
- Loot (1932), actress Louise Brooks featured on the cover
- Love Blind
- Love Came Late
- Love Comes Flying
- Love Wings
- The Lovely Liar
- Lucky Lady
- Men at Her Feet (1933)
- Moon Over the Water
- The Mountain Lodge
- A New Friend
- Pay Check
- Step-Child
- This Man Is Yours
- Trapped By Love
- $20 a Week
- Honeymoon Delayed

=== As Adam Bliss ===
- The Camden Ruby Murders
- Four Times a Widower
- Murder Upstairs

== Filmography ==
- Twenty Dollars a Week (1935)
- Dancing Feet (1936)
- Jennifer Hale (1937)
- I Demand Payment (1938), based on Second Choice
