= Queen of the Northwoods =

1929 film

- Directed by: Spencer Gordon Bennet; Thomas Storey
- Written by: George Arthur Gray
- Starring: Walter Miller; Ethlyne Clair; Frank Lackteen
- Distributed by: Pathé
- Release date: May 21, 1929
- Running time: 10 chapters
- Country: United States
- Languages: Silent; English intertitles

Queen of the Northwoods is a 1929 American silent Western film serial by Pathé, directed by Spencer Gordon Bennet and Thomas Storey, with a story by George Arthur Gray. Known cast members were Walter Miller, Ethlyne Clair and Frank Lackteen. This serial was silent, had ten episodes and is believed to still exist.

== Plot ==
A mysterious masked villain known as the Wolf Devil tries to drive all of the non-native settlers out of Alaska. Walter Miller plays a Royal Canadian Mounted Police officer named Inspector Steele. Tom London plays the villainous Wolf Devil, who covers his face with a wolfskin headdress. The Wolf Devil kidnaps the heroine, Miss Moreau.

== Cast ==
- Walter Miller - Inspector Steele
- Ethlyne Clair - Miss Moreau
- Tom London - Garvin / The Wolf-Devil
- Frank Lackteen - Jacques De Brun
- Edward Cecil - Fergus
- George Magrill - Sergeant Bolt
- Nelson McDowell - Flapjack
- Jean Diamond - Moon River Lady
- Arthur Taylor
- Fred Burns
- Arthur Dewey

Chapter Titles

[1] “The Wolf Devil’s Challenge,”

[2] “A Bottomless Grave,”

[3] “Devil Worshippers,”

[4] “Wings of Death,”

[5] “The Wolf Devil Strikes,”

[6] “The Leap of Death,”

[7] “The Flaming Peril,”

[8] “Brand of the Beast,”

[9] “Trapped by the Fiend,”

[10] “The Den of Evil,”

== The Wolf Devil ==
The villain of the serial is one of film's first werewolves (although he is just masquerading and acting like a wolf). The Wolf Devil wears a wolfskin headdress that completely covers his face. A supernatural atmosphere is created by his apparent ability to control the local wolves.

== See also ==
- List of film serials
- List of film serials by studio
