= Dorothy Fay =

American actress (1915–2003)

- Born: Dorothy Alice Fay Southworth; April 4, 1915; Prescott, Arizona, U.S.
- Died: November 5, 2003 (aged 88); Los Angeles, California, U.S.
- Other names: Dorothy Faye; Dorothy Fay Ritter
- Occupation: Actress
- Years active: 1938–1941
- Spouse: Tex Ritter (m. 1941; died 1974)
- Children: 2, including John Ritter
- Relatives: Jason Ritter (grandson); Tyler Ritter (grandson)

Dorothy Fay (born Dorothy Alice Fay Southworth, April 4, 1915 – November 5, 2003) was an American actress mainly known for her appearances in Western movies.

== Early life and career ==
She was born Dorothy Fay Southworth in Prescott, Arizona, the daughter of Harry T. Southworth and Harriet Fay Fox. Her father was a medical doctor. Fay attended the Caroline Leonetti School, the University of London, and the University of Southern California in Los Angeles, California. She also studied acting at the Royal Academy of Dramatic Art in London.

== Career ==
Fay began her motion picture career in the late 1930s, performing in several B grade westerns. In 1938, she appeared opposite George Houston in Frontier Scout at Grand National Pictures. She also appeared with Western stars Buck Jones and William Elliott.

Fay made four movies with her husband, country singer and actor Tex Ritter, at Monogram Pictures: Song of the Buckaroo (1938), Sundown on the Prairie (1939), Rollin' Westward (1939) and Rainbow Over the Range (1940). She played a heroine in The Green Archer (1940) and White Eagle (1941), both at Columbia Pictures. Fay also made a few small appearances in other genres, such as the crime drama Missing Daughters (1939). In 1940, she asked Monogram to give her a different part and was loaned to MGM for a small role in The Philadelphia Story, which starred Cary Grant, James Stewart, and Katharine Hepburn. She also appeared as a debutante in the MGM musical Lady Be Good (1941) starring Ann Sothern, Eleanor Powell, Robert Young and Lionel Barrymore.

== Later years ==
Fay married singer/actor Tex Ritter on June 14, 1941. Fay made several more movies after she and Ritter married, but then retired from show business in late 1941. In 1965, she and Ritter moved to Nashville, Tennessee, because of his singing and recording career. For a time, she was an official greeter at the Grand Ole Opry. On January 2, 1974, Ritter suffered a fatal heart attack (the family suspects a dissecting aortic aneurysm) in Nashville. Fay and Ritter had been married 32 years and had two sons; Thomas and the late comedic actor John Ritter.

Fay returned to Southern California in 1981. She turned down several offers to return to movie work, including an opportunity to appear on the ABC television series The Love Boat playing the mother of real-life son, John. But she did appear with him in the TV special "Superstars and their Moms" in 1987. She was also a frequent guest at western movie conventions.

In 1987, Fay suffered a stroke that impacted her speech. She moved to the Motion Picture & Television Country House and Hospital in Woodland Hills, California, in 1989. In August 2001, she was mistakenly reported to have died by The Daily Telegraph newspaper in London. The error happened when an employee at the retirement home found that Fay was not in her room, and after inquiring about her absence, was told that Fay had "gone", by which it was meant that she had left her room and was in another wing of the building. However, the employee mistook this as meaning she had died, and telephoned a friend — who happened to work at the Telegraph's obituaries desk — with the supposed "news". Fay and her family found the blunder amusing and took it in good sport.

== Death ==
Fay died of natural causes at the age of 88 at the Motion Picture and Television Home in Woodland Hills, California, less than two months after the death of her son, John. She is interred with her parents at Mountain View Cemetery in her hometown of Prescott, Arizona.

== Filmography ==
Year	Title	Role	Notes
1938	Frontier Scout	Julie, Steve's Sweetheart	
1938	The Stranger from Arizona	Ann Turner	
1938	Law of the Texan	Helen Clifford	
1938	Prairie Justice	Anita Benson	Opposite Bob Baker a singing cowboy
1938	Song of the Buckaroo	Anna Alden	
1939	Long Shot	Betty Ralston	
1939	Trigger Pals	Doris Allen	Credited as Dorothy Faye
1939	Sundown on the Prairie	Ruth Graham	Alternative title: Prairie Sundown
1939	Rollin' Westward	Betty	Alternative title: Rollin' West
1939	Missing Daughters	Showgirl	Uncredited
1940	Convicted Woman	Frances	Uncredited
1940	Sporting Blood	Guest	Uncredited; Alternative title: Sterling Metal
1940	Rainbow Over the Range	Mary Manners	
1940	Glamour for Sale	Trilby	Uncredited
1940	The Green Archer	Elaine Bellamy	
1940	The Philadelphia Story	Main Line Society Woman	Uncredited
1941	White Eagle	Janet Rand	
1941	North from the Lone Star	Madge Wilson	
1941	Lady Be Good	Debutante	Uncredited
