= Hoofbeats of Vengeance =

1929 film

- Directed by: Henry MacRae
- Screenplay by: George H. Plympton
- Story by: George H. Plympton; William Lord Wright; Gardner Bradford
- Starring: Rex the Wonder Horse; Jack Perrin; Helen Foster; Al Ferguson; Starlight the Horse; Markee the Horse
- Cinematography: George Robinson
- Edited by: Tom Malloy
- Production company: Universal Pictures
- Distributed by: Universal Pictures
- Release date: June 4, 1929
- Running time: 50 minutes
- Country: United States
- Languages: Silent; English intertitles

Hoofbeats of Vengeance is a 1929 American silent Western film directed by Henry MacRae and written by George H. Plympton. The film stars Rex the Wonder Horse, Jack Perrin, Helen Foster, Al Ferguson, Starlight the Horse and Markee the Horse. The film was released on June 4, 1929, by Universal Pictures. A print of Hoofbeats of Vengeance exists in the film holdings of Jon C. Mirsalis (Gordon Berkow collection).

== Cast ==
- Rex the Wonder Horse as Rex the Wonder Horse
- Jack Perrin as Sgt. Jack Gordon
- Helen Foster as Mary Martin
- Al Ferguson as Jud Regan
- Starlight the Horse as Starlight
- Markee the Horse as Markee
