= City Park (1934 film) =

1934 film by Richard Thorpe

- Directed by: Richard Thorpe
- Written by: Karl Brown
- Produced by: George R. Batcheller
- Starring: Sally Blane; Henry B. Walthall; Matty Kemp
- Cinematography: M.A. Anderson
- Edited by: Richard Thorpe
- Production company: Chesterfield Pictures
- Distributed by: Chesterfield Pictures
- Release date: May 1, 1934
- Running time: 72 minutes
- Country: United States
- Language: English

City Park is a 1934 American comedy drama film directed by Richard Thorpe and starring Sally Blane, Henry B. Walthall and Matty Kemp. It was produced and distributed by the independent studio Chesterfield Pictures, which was later merged into Republic Pictures.

== Cast ==
- Sally Blane as Rose Wentworth
- Henry B. Walthall as Colonel Henry Randolph Ransome
- Matty Kemp as Raymond Ransome
- Hale Hamilton as Herbert Ransome
- John Harron as Charlie Hooper
- Claude King as General Horace G. Stevens
- Gwen Lee as Maizie, the Hooker
- Judith Vosselli as Mrs. Herbert Ransome
- Wilson Benge as Andrew Cook
- Lafe McKee as Matt O'Donnell
- Mary Foy as Mrs. Guppy, Landlady
- Ted Billings as Man in Park
- Bess Flowers as Stevens' Secretary
- Frank LaRue as Detective
- Hattie McDaniel as Tessie - the Ransome Maid
- Lee Phelps as Plainclothesman in Park
- Eddie Phillips as Pool Shark
- Lloyd Whitlock as District Attorney

== Bibliography ==
- Michael R. Pitts. Poverty Row Studios, 1929–1940: An Illustrated History of 55 Independent Film Companies, with a Filmography for Each. McFarland & Company, 2005.
