= Black Cyclone =

1925 silent Western film

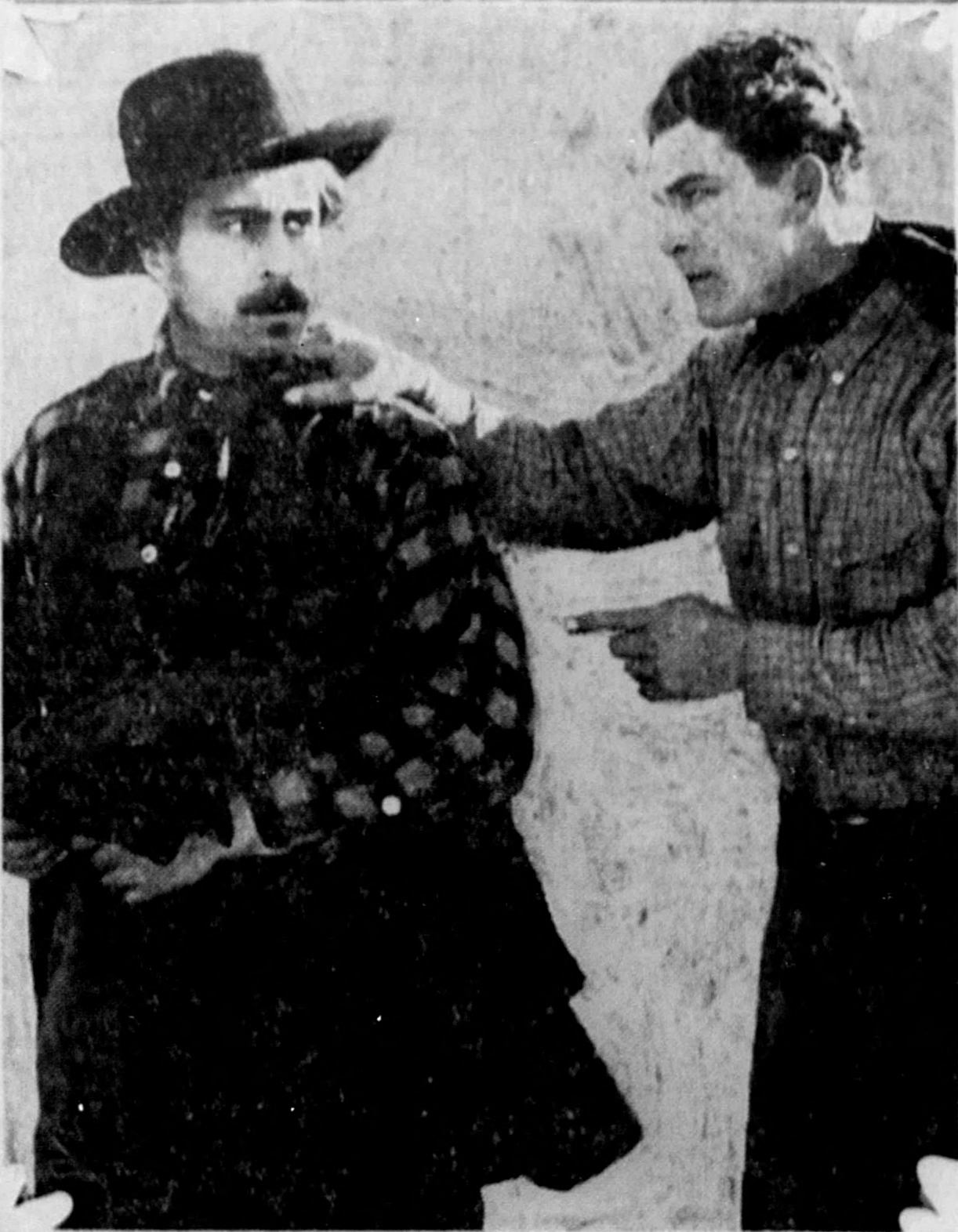
- Still photo featuring Christian Frank and Guinn Williams
- Directed by: Fred Jackman
- Starring: Guinn "Big Boy" Williams; Kathleen Collins; Rex the King of Wild Horses
- Distributed by: Pathé Exchange
- Release date: 8 May 1925
- Running time: 57 minutes
- Country: United States
- Languages: Silent; English intertitles

Black Cyclone is a 1925 American silent Western film directed by Fred Jackman. The film stars Guinn "Big Boy" Williams, Kathleen Collins, and Rex the King of Wild Horses. The film survives.

== Plot ==
As described in a film magazine review, Rex, a wild horse of the plains, courts The Lady, an aristocratic mare, but loses her when they wander into the valley ruled by Joe Pangle and his herd of horses. After a fight with Pangle, Rex retreats.

Rex stumbles into a stream on his way back and becomes trapped in quicksand. He is rescued by Jim Lawson, who pulls him out of the water. That night, Rex repays the favor by driving off a pack of wolves that had attacked Lawson, and later, he fights a mountain lion to save the man's life.

Then, Pangle pursues Jane Logan, and Lawson chases after them on horseback. When Lawson's horse is shot, Rex allows him to mount. Rex assists Lawson once more, helping him defeat Pangle in the climactic fight. The Lady reunites with Rex, and Jane returns to Lawson.

== Cast ==
- Guinn "Big Boy" Williams as Jim Lawson
- Kathleen Collins as Jane Logan
- Christian J. Frank as Joe Pangle
- Noah Young as Cowboy (uncredited)

== Preservation ==
A 35 mm triacetate master positive of Black Cyclone is held by George Eastman Museum.
