= Guardians of the Wild =

1928 film

- Directed by: Henry MacRae
- Screenplay by: Basil Dickey; George Morgan; Gardner Bradford
- Story by: Basil Dickey; George Morgan
- Starring: Rex the Wonder Horse; Jack Perrin; Starlight the Horse; Ethlyne Clair; Al Ferguson; Robert Homans
- Cinematography: Virgil Miller; George Robinson
- Edited by: Tom Malloy
- Production company: Universal Pictures
- Distributed by: Universal Pictures
- Release date: September 16, 1928
- Running time: 50 minutes
- Country: United States
- Language: Silent

Guardians of the Wild is a 1928 American silent Western film directed by Henry MacRae and written by Basil Dickey, George Morgan and Gardner Bradford. The film stars Rex the Wonder Horse, Jack Perrin, Starlight the Horse, Ethlyne Clair, Al Ferguson and Robert Homans. The film was released on September 16, 1928, by Universal Pictures.

== Cast ==
- Rex the Wonder Horse as Rex
- Jack Perrin as Jerry Lane
- Starlight the Horse as Starlight
- Ethlyne Clair as Madge Warren
- Al Ferguson as Mark Haman
- Robert Homans as John Warren
- Bernard Siegel as Won Long Hop
