= Jennifer Hale (film) =

1937 British crime film directed by Bernard Mainwaring

- Opening titles
- Directed by: Bernard Mainwaring
- Written by: Bernard Mainwaring; Ralph Stock; Edward Dryhurst
- Based on: novel by. Rob Eden
- Produced by: John Findlay
- Starring: René Ray; Ballard Berkeley; John Longden
- Distributed by: Twentieth Century Fox
- Release date: 1937
- Running time: 66 minutes
- Country: United Kingdom
- Language: English

Jennifer Hale is a 1937 British crime film directed by Bernard Mainwaring and starring René Ray, Ballard Berkeley and John Longden. It was written by Mainwaring, Ralph Stock and Edward Dryhurst based on the 1934 novel of the same title by Rob Eden.

== Plot ==
A London showgirl is wrongly accused of murdering her manager and goes on the run to try to prove her innocence. After establishing a new life as a taxi dancer in Birmingham, and falling in love with one of her clients, her past life comes back to haunt her.

== Cast ==
- René Ray as Jennifer Hale
- Ballard Berkeley as Richard Severn
- John Longden as Police Inspector Merton
- Paul Blake as Norman Ives
- Frank Birch as Sharman
- Richard Parry as Jim Watson
- Ernest Sefton as Police Sergeant Owen
- Patricia Burke as Maisie Brewer

== Production ==
The film was made as a quota quickie at Wembley Studios by the British subsidiary of Twentieth Century Fox.

== Reception ==
The Monthly Film Bulletin wrote: "The story proceeds steadily and calmly to its climax. The minor characters of the film are well drawn and add to the interest of the main plot. The acting throughout is good and the direction is competent."

The Daily Film Renter wrote: "A great deal of the development is put over in terms of dialogue, some of which can hardly be described as sparkling, while one or two characters grossly overact. There is, however, a fair degree of interest in the development of the plot, although the climax lacks any surprise denouement ... Settings, which embrace Scotland Yard, a provincial theatre and dance hall, are quite good. René Ray gives an appealing show as the 'wanted' Jennifer, John Longden makes a laconic Yard man, and Ballard Berkeley gives a characteristic performance as a young architect who falls in love with the girl."
