= Waterfront Lady =

1935 film by Joseph Santley

- Directed by: Joseph Santley
- Written by: Joseph Fields (additional dialogue); Wellyn Totman (story and screenplay)
- Produced by: Colbert Clark (supervising producer); Nat Levine (producer)
- Starring: See below
- Cinematography: Ernest Miller
- Edited by: Ray Curtiss
- Production company: Mascot Pictures
- Release date: October 5, 1935
- Running time: 70 minutes
- Country: United States
- Language: English

Waterfront Lady is a 1935 American film directed by Joseph Santley and starring Ann Rutherford, in her feature film debut (she had previously appeared in the serial The Fighting Marines, also produced by Mascot Pictures), and Frank Albertson.

== Plot ==
Jim "Mac" McFee finds running two illegal gambling ships too much, so he promises to make Ronald "Ronny" Hillyer, who manages one of his ships, a partner. Ronny has to fend off the advances of Gloria Vance, his boss's singer girlfriend.

When Ronny becomes suspicious of two casino patrons he does not recognize, he suspects lookout Tom Burdon is a traitor and alerts Mac. Mac calls Burdon into his office, but it is too late. The police board the ship. Burdon pulls out a pistol, and in the ensuing struggle is accidentally shot and killed by Mac with Burdon's own weapon. Ronny rushes in and grabs the gun. When the police enter the office, Ronny runs out another door, jumps in the water and swims ashore, covering for his new partner.

Ronny steals a sailor's clothes. He then encounters Joan O'Brien and her alcoholic, gambler father, Capt. O'Brien. They tell him that their neighbor, Alex (whose clothes he is wearing), is a fisherman who will be gone for a while. Pretending to be a friend of Alex named Bill, he hides from the police manhunt in Alex's home. As they spend time together, Ronny and Joan begin falling in love. He phones Mac, and they make plans to flee to South America.

Capt. O'Brien takes Ronny to a crap game. Ronny tries to discourage him from playing, but O'Brien will not listen, so Ronny gets into the game, and using his skill with the dice, wins everybody's money. Joan's would-be boyfriend Tod finds out and tells Joan. She is at first disappointed in Ronny, but soon realizes that he was protecting her father, putting all his winnings in the book the O'Briens keep their money. He also gives Mrs. Spadaloni the money that her husband Tony lost in the game.

Tod suspects Ronny is the man the police are after. When Alex returns, Tod reunites him with his "friend". They find him saying goodbye to Joan. Ronny gets away.

Later he phones Mac to tell him where he is hiding out, but Gloria answers and decides to go see him herself without telling Mac. She tries to talk him into running away together, but Ronny is not interested. Mac follows, and realizing that Ronny would never betray him, breaks up with Gloria and tells Ronny he has arranged for a freighter to smuggle him out of the country. He takes the murder weapon, planning to dispose of it. Ronny insists on going to see Joan again. Jess, Mac's right-hand man overhears Gloria informing the police where he is going. Mac and Jess hire some goons and rush over. A fight breaks out when Tod sports Ronny with Joan, and the police capture Ronny and Mac, the latter with the pistol. Ronny keeps on lying for Mac, but Mac confesses to killing Burdon in self-defense. That leaves Ronnie and Joan free to embark on Joan's dream: to open a restaurant.

== Cast ==
- Ann Rutherford as Joan O'Brien
- Frank Albertson as Ronny Hillyer
- J. Farrell MacDonald as Capt. O'Brien
- Barbara Pepper as Gloria Vance
- Charles C. Wilson as Jim McFee
- Grant Withers as Tod
- Purnell Pratt as Dist. Atty. Shaw
- Jack La Rue as Tom Burden
- Ward Bond as Jess
- Paul Porcasi as Tony Spadaloni
- Mary Gordon as Mrs. O'Flaherty
- Mathilde Comont as Mrs. Spadaloni
- Robert Emmett O'Connor as Police lieutenant
- Clarence Wilson as Truant officer
- Victor Potel as Alex
- Wally Albright as Mickey O'Flaherty
- Smiley Burnette as Musician
- Naomi Judge as Mrs. DeLacy
- Norma Taylor as Blonde casino patron

== Soundtrack ==
- "Deep Dark River" (Music and Lyrics by Smiley Burnette)
- "What I Wouldn't Do" (Music and Lyrics by Smiley Burnette)

== Production ==
Part of the film was shot off the San Pedro harbor in California.

== Critical reception ==
Motion Picture Herald described it as an "unpretentious picture", made up of "tried and true" elements with a "novel twist". Ann Rutherford was complimented "in her first starring role", along with some of the supporting players, Frank Albertson, Barbara Pepper, Grant Withers and J. Farrell Macdonald.
