= Ethlyne Clair =

American actress (1904–1996)

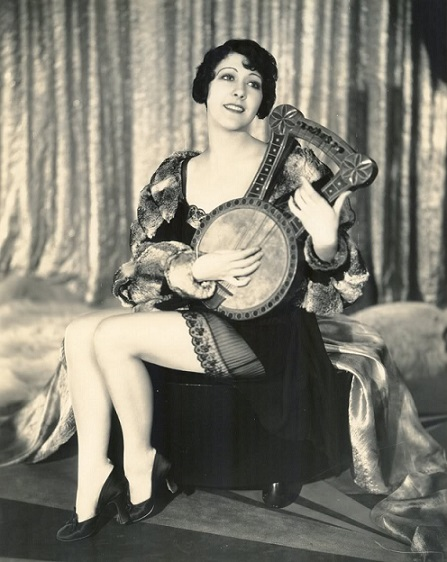
- Clair, c. 1928
- Born: Ethlyne Clair Williamson; November 23, 1904; Talladega, Alabama, U.S.
- Died: February 27, 1996 (aged 91); Los Angeles, California, U.S.
- Occupation: Actress
- Spouse(s): Richard Lonsdale Hinshaw (1928–1930) (divorced); Ern Westmore (1930–1937) (divorced); Merle Arthur Frost Jr. (1939–?)
- Children: 5 (2 daughters, 3 sons)

Ethlyne Clair (November 23, 1904 – February 27, 1996), born Ethlyne Clair Williamson, was an American actress, mainly seen in silent films.

== Early life and education ==
Clair was born in Talladega, Alabama, and raised in Selma, Alabama and Atlanta, the daughter of Edwin Williamson and Lula W. Densler Williamson. Her father was an inspector for the railroad. She attended Brenau College in Georgia and studied art in Washington, D.C.

== Career ==
Clair was considered a "perfect movie type", with "every photographic quality in abundance." She appeared mostly in silent films, including three Westerns where she played the love interest to Hoot Gibson. In Hey Rube! (1928) she played a "circus vamp" named Zelda. She appeared in the serials The Vanishing Rider (1928) and Queen of the Northwoods (1929), and in the early sound picture From Headquarters (1929). She was a WAMPAS Baby Star in 1929. "I wanted to do big things and become a big star, not ride horses through the desert," she explained to an interviewer in 1991. "I just wanted to be a beautiful vamp." She also expressed hopes for a writing career. After her last film in 1931, she was active in Hollywood social circles, and a member of the Film Welfare League.

== Personal life ==
Clair was married three times, and had five children. She married Richard Lonsdale Hanshaw, an agent and producer, under duress in 1928. They divorced in 1930, and eight days later she married Ern Westmore, a studio makeup artist, in a dramatic event that included confrontations with Westmore's first wife and child, and a photographer who caught the tense scene. They divorced in 1937. Her third husband was Merle Arthur Frost Jr., an automobile dealer. He died in 1968. On February 27, 1996, Clair died of respiratory failure after ulcer surgery at Tarzana Hospital in Los Angeles, at the age of 91.

== Selected filmography ==
- Sandra (1924)
- Chickie (1925)
- The Newlyweds series of comedy shorts, including The Newlyweds' Neighbors (1926), The Newlyweds' Quarantine (1926), The Newlyweds' Servant (1927), The Newlyweds' Mistake (1927)
- The Snookums series of comedy shorts, including Snookums' Buggy Ride (1926), Snookums Cleans Up (1926), Snookums' Merry Christmas (1926), Snookums' Outing (1926), Snookums Asleep (1927), Snookums Disappears (1927)
- The Hero on Horseback (1927)
- Three Miles Up (1927)
- Painted Ponies (1927)
- The Vanishing Rider (1928)
- Wild Blood (1928)
- Riding for Fame (1928)
- Guardians of the Wild (1928)
- Hey Rube! (1928)
- From Headquarters (1929)
- Queen of the Northwoods (1929)
- The Pride of Pawnee (1929)
- The Show of Shows (1929)
- Second Choice (1930)
- God's Gift to Women (1931)
