= Chickie =

1925 film

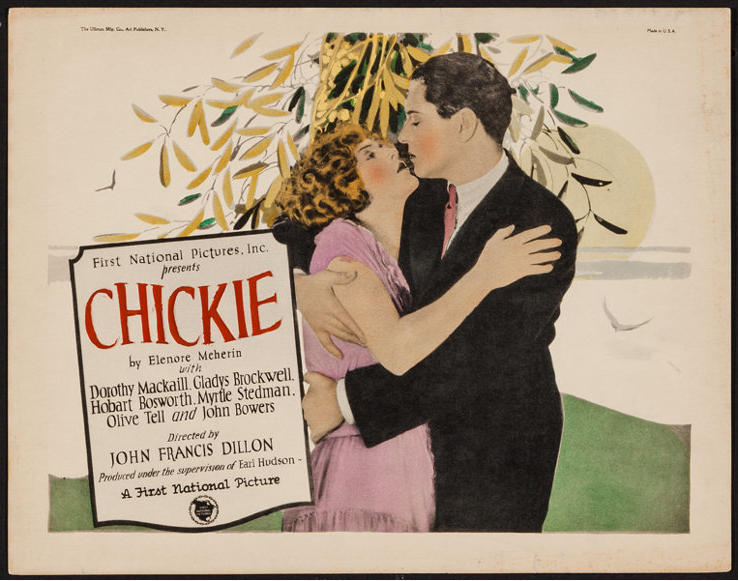
- Lobby card
- Directed by: John Francis Dillon
- Written by: Marion Orth
- Based on: Chickie by Elenore Meherin
- Starring: Dorothy Mackaill
- Cinematography: James Van Trees
- Edited by: Arthur Tavares
- Distributed by: First National Pictures
- Release date: May 10, 1925
- Running time: 80 minutes
- Country: United States
- Language: Silent (English intertitles)

Chickie is a 1925 American silent drama film produced and released by First National Pictures. Based on the novel of the same name by Elenore Meherin, the film was directed by John Francis Dillon and starred Dorothy Mackaill. Chickie is now considered lost.

== Plot ==
As described in a film magazine review, Chickie is a stenographer in New York City whose flirtations with the young lawyer in the offices across the court have enmeshed the hearts of both. Barry Dunne, the lawyer, is coveted by Ila Moore, the daughter of the head of the firm. She takes him to a party held at Bess Abbott's. There he finds Chickie, who has been brought by Janina to give a filip to the jaded tastes of bachelor millionaire Jake Munson. Disgusted at the open love-making at the party, Chickie escapes and Barry follows. They ride all night. Jake proposes that Chickie become his "friend" so that he can share his good things with her, but she refuses. Later, he loves her and proposes marriage. She had previously yielded to the order of Barry, and confesses her misstep to Jake, who leaves her in disgust. Jake goes to London. Chickie's appeal to him to marry her falls into Ila's hands, who sends a cable in Jake's name stating that he has married Ila. Chickie confesses to her parents. After the child is born, they are about to sell their place and move away when Jake returns for her, unwed and eager to marry her.

== Cast ==
- Dorothy Mackaill as Chickie
- John Bowers as Barry Dunne
- Hobart Bosworth as Jonathan
- Gladys Brockwell as Jennie
- Paul Nicholson as Jake Munson
- Myrtle Stedman as Janina
- Olive Tell as Ila Moore
- Lora Sanderson as Bess Abbott
- Louise Mackintosh as Mrs. Dunne
- Ethlyne Clair (undetermined role)
