= Betty Burgess =

American actress (1917 - 2002)

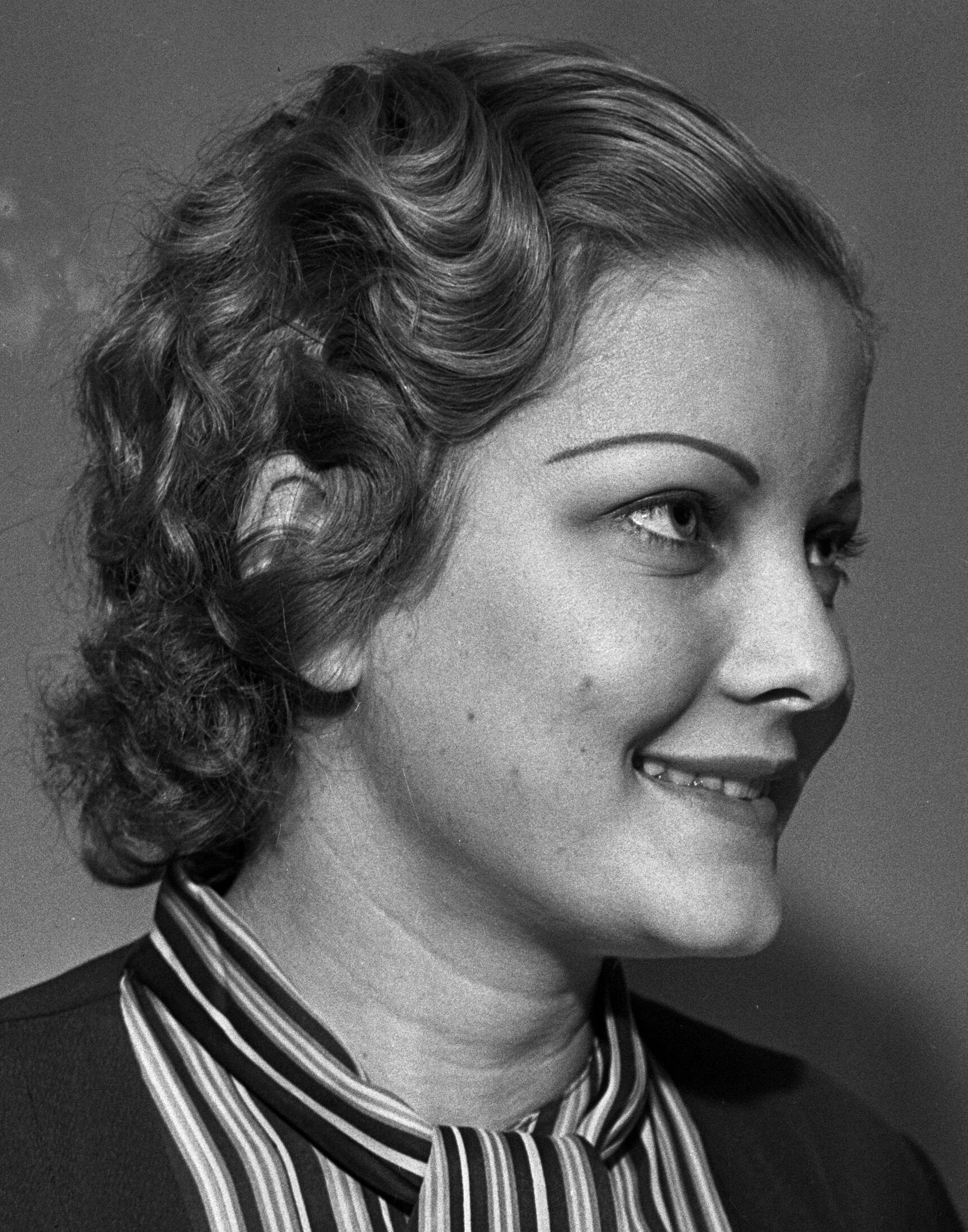
Betty Burgess in 1935

Betty Burgess (February 15, 1917 – 2002) was a singer, dancer, and actress in the United States. She married Duncan Laing in 1951 and then George Zaharias in January 1960. She co-starred in the 1935 film Coronado and the 1938 film I Demand Payment.

She worked for Paramount as a promising young star. She performed with Sonny Lamont.

== Filmography ==
- Pirate Party on Catalina Isle, a 2-reel short
- Coronado (1935)
- Tough to Handle (1937)
- I Demand Payment (1938)
- The Adventures of the Masked Phantom (1939), a "campy" Western themed musical
