= The Harvest of Hate =

1929 film

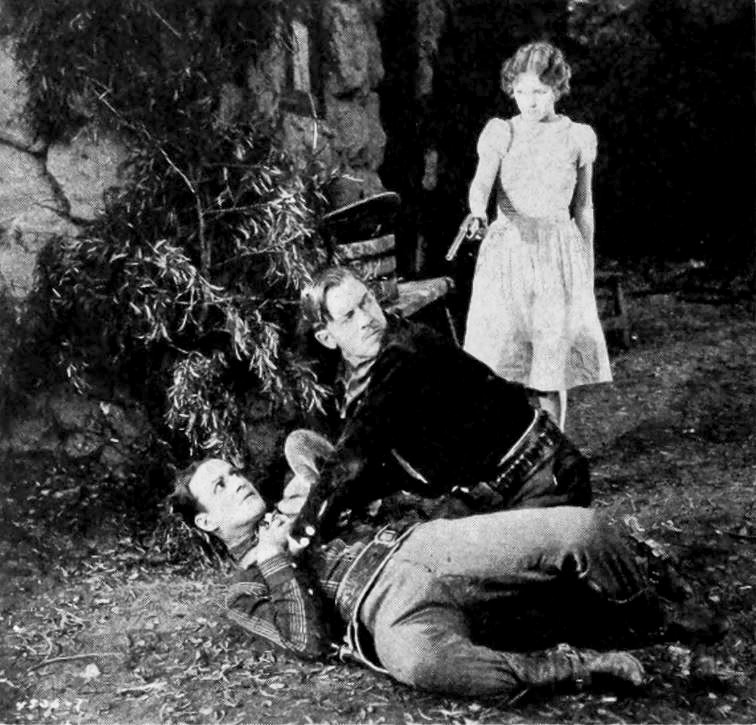
- Film still
- Directed by: Henry MacRae
- Screenplay by: George H. Plympton; Gardner Bradford
- Story by: William Lord Wright; George H. Plympton
- Starring: Rex the Wonder Horse; Jack Perrin; Helen Foster; Tom London; Starlight the Horse
- Cinematography: George Robinson
- Edited by: Tom Malloy
- Production company: Universal Pictures
- Distributed by: Universal Pictures
- Release date: August 4, 1929
- Running time: 50 minutes
- Country: United States
- Language: Silent (English intertitles)

The Harvest of Hate is a 1929 American silent Western film directed by Henry MacRae and written by George H. Plympton and Gardner Bradford. The film stars Rex the Wonder Horse, Jack Perrin, Helen Foster, Tom London, and Starlight the Horse. The film was released on August 4, 1929, by Universal Pictures.

== Cast ==
- Rex the Wonder Horse as Rex
- Jack Perrin as Jack Merritt
- Helen Foster as Margie Smith
- Tom London as Martin Trask
- Starlight the Horse as Starlight

== Preservation ==
A print of The Harvest of Hate is listed as located in the BFI National Archive.
