= Law of the Texan =

1938 film by Elmer Clifton

- Theatrical release poster
- Directed by: Elmer Clifton
- Screenplay by: Monroe Shaff; Arthur Hoerl
- Produced by: L.G. Leonard
- Starring: Buck Jones; Dorothy Fay; Kenneth Harlan; Don Douglas; Matty Kemp; Joe Whitehead
- Cinematography: Edward Linden
- Edited by: Robert O. Crandall
- Production company: Columbia Pictures
- Distributed by: Columbia Pictures
- Release date: October 24, 1938
- Running time: 54 minutes
- Country: United States
- Language: English

Law of the Texan is a 1938 American Western film directed by Elmer Clifton and written by Monroe Shaff and Arthur Hoerl. The film stars Buck Jones, Dorothy Fay, Kenneth Harlan, Don Douglas, Matty Kemp and Joe Whitehead. The film was released on October 24, 1938, by Columbia Pictures.

== Plot ==
Shipments are being stolen, so the Rangers send Buck and his men to protect the next shipment, when that is also stolen, Buck is kicked out of the Rangers and joins the gang responsible for the crimes. But that is just an excuse to find the leader of the gang known as El Coyote.

== Cast ==
- Buck Jones as Sergeant Buck Weaver
- Dorothy Fay as Helen Clifford
- Kenneth Harlan as Allen Spencer
- Don Douglas as Chet Hackett
- Matty Kemp as Jack Bryant
- Joe Whitehead as Flaherty
- Forrest Taylor as Captain Moore
- José Luis Tortosa as Col. Sanchez
- Tommy Mack as Juan
- Milisa Sierra as Rosa
- Bob Kortman as Quinn
