= Fred Jackman =

American cinematographer (1881–1959)

Fred Wood Jackman
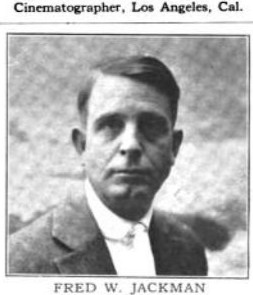
- Fred Jackman in 1917
- Born: Fred Wood Jackman Sr. July 9, 1881; Iowa, US
- Died: August 27, 1959 (aged 78); Hollywood, California, US
- Occupations: Cinematographer, film director
- Years active: 1916–1927
- Title: A.S.C. President (1921–1923)
- Children: 1

Fred Wood Jackman Sr. (July 9, 1881 – August 27, 1959), was an American cinematographer and film director of the silent era. He worked on 58 films as a cinematographer between 1916 and 1925. He also directed eleven films between 1919 and 1927, including two film serials for Hal Roach Studios.

He was born in Iowa and died in Hollywood, California. His son, Fred Jackman Jr. was at one time married to Nancy Kelly, who had been a child actress in silent films. His brother Floyd Jackman (1885 - 1962) was a cinematographer who worked on numerous silent films, including some early Laurel and Hardy shorts.

== Partial filmography ==
- Love, Honor and Behave (1920)
- White Eagle (1922)
- The Timber Queen (1922)
- The Call of the Wild (1923)
- The King of Wild Horses (1924)
- Black Cyclone (1925)
- The Devil Horse (1926)
- No Man's Law (1927)
