= Tough to Handle =

1937 film by S. Roy Luby

- Directed by: S. Roy Luby
- Written by: Peter B. Kyne (story The Joy of Living); Betty Laidlaw (adaptation); Robert Lively (adaptation); Robert Neville (screenplay)
- Produced by: Maurice Conn
- Starring: Frankie Darro; Kane Richmond; Phyllis Cerf
- Cinematography: Jack Greenhalgh
- Edited by: Richard G. Wray
- Production company: Conn Pictures
- Distributed by: Conn Pictures
- Release date: November 24, 1937
- Running time: 60 minutes
- Country: United States
- Language: English

Tough to Handle is a 1937 American action film directed by S. Roy Luby and starring Frankie Darro, Kane Richmond and Phyllis Cerf.

== Plot ==
A reporter's grandfather wins a sweepstake, but later discovers that that is ticket was not legal. The police are looking for the con-artists that is responsible for fake tickets, so the reporter and his brother try to expose the gang.

== Cast ==
- Frankie Darro as Mike Sanford
- Kane Richmond as Joe MacIntyre
- Phyllis Cerf as Gloria Sanford
- Harry J. Worth as Tony Franco
- Betty Burgess as Myra George
- Johnstone White as Reggie Whitney
- Burr Caruth as Grandpa Sanford
- Stanley Price as Jake
