= Dancing Feet (film) =

1936 film by Joseph Santley

- Directed by: Joseph Santley
- Screenplay by: Jerome Chodorov; Olive Cooper; Wellyn Totman
- Story by: David Silverstein
- Based on: Dancing Feet by Rob Eden
- Produced by: Colbert Clark
- Starring: Ben Lyon; Joan Marsh; Edward Nugent; Isabel Jewell; James Burke; Purnell Pratt
- Cinematography: Jack A. Marta; Ernest Miller
- Edited by: Ralph Dixon
- Music by: Marlin Skiles
- Production company: Republic Pictures
- Distributed by: Republic Pictures
- Release date: January 20, 1936
- Running time: 70 minutes
- Country: United States
- Language: English

Dancing Feet is a 1936 American comedy film directed by Joseph Santley and written by Jerome Chodorov, Olive Cooper and Wellyn Totman. It is based on the 1931 novel Dancing Feet by Rob Eden. The film stars Ben Lyon, Joan Marsh, Edward Nugent, Isabel Jewell, James Burke and Purnell Pratt. The film was released on January 20, 1936, by Republic Pictures.

== Cast ==
- Edward Nugent as Jimmy Cassidy
- Joan Marsh as Judy Jones
- Ben Lyon as Peyton Wells
- Isabel Jewell as Mabel Henry
- James Burke as Phil Moore
- Purnell Pratt as Silas P. Jones
- Vince Barnett as Willoughby
- Nick Condos as Speciality Dancer
- Herbert Rawlinson as Oliver Groves
- Lillian Harmer as Aggie
- Herbert Corthell as Jenkins
- James P. Burtis as Stupe (as Jimmy Burtis)
- Harry C. Bradley as Hotel Assistant Manager
- Cy Kendall as Hotel Detective
- Lynton Brent as Hotel Clerk
- Wilson Benge as Silas' Butler
- J. C. Edwards and Band
