= Stormy (1935 film) =

1935 film by Lew Landers

- Directed by: Lew Landers
- Screenplay by: Ben Grauman Kohn; George H. Plympton
- Story by: Cherry Wilson
- Produced by: Henry MacRae
- Starring: Noah Beery, Jr. Jean Rogers; J. Farrell MacDonald; Raymond Hatton; Walter Miller; Fred Kohler
- Cinematography: Richard Fryer; John Hickson; William A. Sickner
- Edited by: Murray Seldeen
- Music by: Heinz Roemheld
- Production company: Universal Pictures
- Distributed by: Universal Pictures
- Release date: October 22, 1935
- Running time: 69 minutes
- Country: United States
- Language: English

Stormy is a 1935 American western drama film directed by Lew Landers, written by Ben Grauman Kohn and George H. Plympton, and starring Noah Beery, Jr., Jean Rogers, J. Farrell MacDonald, Raymond Hatton, Walter Miller and Fred Kohler. It was released on October 22, 1935, by Universal Pictures.

== Cast ==
- Noah Beery, Jr. as Stormy
- Jean Rogers as Kerry Dorn
- J. Farrell MacDonald as Trinidad Dorn
- Raymond Hatton as Stuffy
- Walter Miller as Craig
- Fred Kohler as Deem Dorn
- James P. Burtis as Greasy
- The Arizona Wranglers as Cowhand Musicians
- Rex, King of the Wild Horses as Rex
- Rex Junior as Rex as a Colt
