= Matty Kemp =

American actor

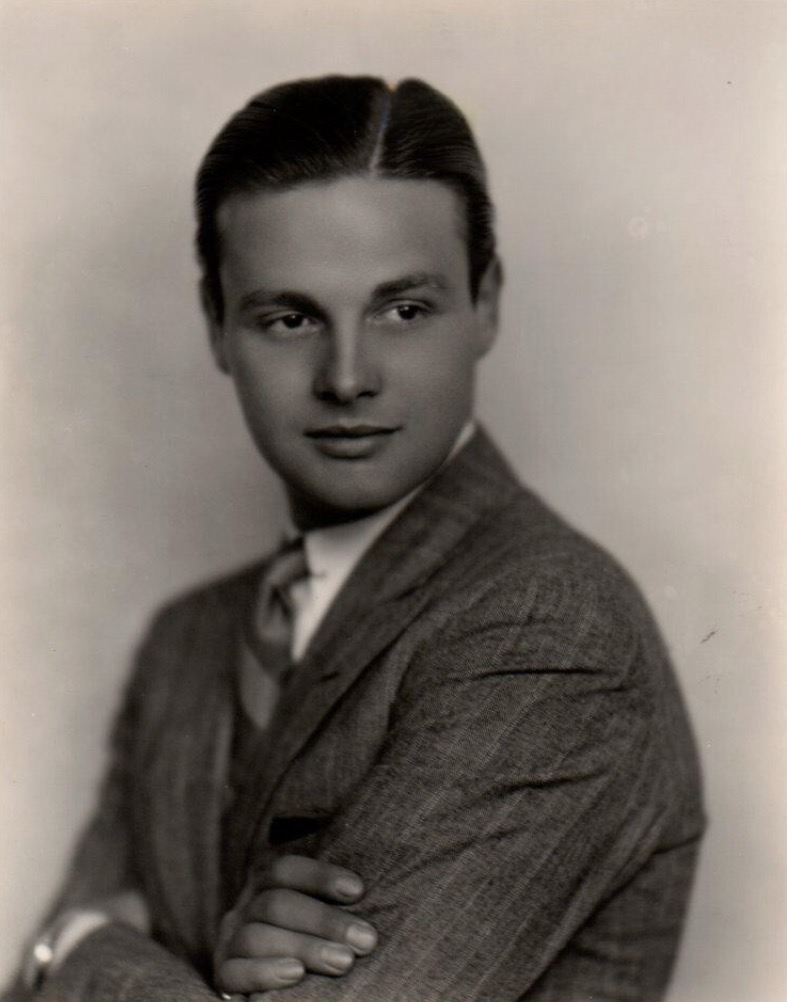
- Kemp c.1920
- Born: September 10, 1907; New York City, New York, U.S.
- Died: December 12, 1999 (aged 92); Los Angeles, California, U.S.
- Resting place: Forest Lawn Memorial Park, Glendale, California
- Occupation: Actor
- Years active: 1926–1943

Matty Kemp (September 10, 1907 – December 12, 1999) was an American film actor. He appeared in more than 50 films between 1926 and 1943.

After retiring from acting, Kemp produced many musical short films. In 1954, he contributed the story for the Jane Russell musical film The French Line.

== Biography ==
A “close friend” of actor and musician Charles "Buddy" Rogers, Kemp was an early manager of The Mary Pickford Foundation. Under his supervision, the organisation made fine grains and dupe negatives of 29 of Mary Pickford's features and 28 of her Biograph shorts.

He is buried at Forest Lawn Memorial Park in Glendale.

== Partial filmography ==
- Rustlers' Ranch (1926) - Clem Allen
- The Magnificent Flirt (1928) - Hubert
- The Good-Bye Kiss (1928) - Bill Williams
- The Campus Vamp (1928, Short) - Matty
- The Million Dollar Collar (1929) - Bill Holmes
- Common Clay (1930) - Arthur Coakley
- City Streets (1931) - Man Stabbed with Fork (uncredited)
- One More Chance (1931, Short) - Percy Howard
- Air Eagles (1931) - Eddie Ramsey
- Probation (1932) - Bert
- Thrill of Youth (1932) - Chet Thayer
- Down to Earth (1932) - Ross Peters
- The Phantom of Crestwood (1932) - Frank Andes
- Tess of the Storm Country (1932) - Dillon (uncredited)
- Wine, Women and Song (1933) - Ray Joyce
- Justice Takes a Holiday (1933) - Larry Harrison
- City Park (1934) - Raymond Ransome
- Cross Streets (1934) - Ken Barclay
- His Night Out (1935) - Salesman (uncredited)
- Three Kids and a Queen (1935) - Reporter (uncredited)
- Dangerous Waters (1936) - Officer Garvey (uncredited)
- Tango (1936) - Anthony Thorne aka 'Tony' Carver
- The Crime of Dr. Forbes (1936) - Student Doctor (uncredited)
- House of Secrets (1936) - Man on Ship (uncredited)
- Red Lights Ahead (1936) - Jerry Carruthers (uncredited)
- A Star Is Born (1937) - Preview Reporter (uncredited)
- Criminals of the Air (1937) - Arnold (uncredited)
- Here's Flash Casey (1938) - Rodney Addison
- Saleslady (1938) - Wheeler
- Campus Confessions (1938) - Ed Riggs
- Law of the Texan (1938) - Ranger Jack Bryant
- I Demand Payment (1938) - Toby Locke
- Sudden Money (1939) - Sound Man (uncredited)
- Million Dollar Legs (1939) - Ed Riggs
- The Adventures of the Masked Phantom (1939) - Stan Barton
- Golden Gloves (1940) - Lefty (uncredited)
- Look Who's Laughing (1941) - Harry (uncredited)
- Cadet Girl (1941) - Phil - Musician (uncredited)
- Chatterbox (1943) - Reporter (uncredited) (final film role)
- The Road to Hollywood (1947) - Percy Howard, Bing's Rival, from 'One More Chance' (archive footage)
- Million Dollar Weekend (1948, Producer)
