= I Demand Payment =

1938 film

- Directed by: Clifford Sanforth
- Written by: Sherman L. Lowe
- Based on: Second Choice by Rob Eden
- Produced by: Clifford Sanforth; Henry Spitz
- Starring: Betty Burgess; Jack La Rue; Matty Kemp
- Cinematography: Robert Doran
- Edited by: Douglass Biggs
- Production company: Imperial Pictures
- Distributed by: Imperial Distributing Corporation
- Release date: November 8, 1938
- Running time: 61 minutes
- Country: United States
- Language: English

I Demand Payment is a 1938 American drama film directed by Clifford Sanforth and starring Betty Burgess, Jack La Rue and Matty Kemp. It is based on Rob Eden's 1932 novel Second Choice. Sherman L. Lowe wrote the screenplay. It was produced by Poverty Row company Imperial Pictures.

== Plot ==
A man finds himself drawn in too deep after going to work for a loan shark, and his new wife tries to leave him after discovering his true occupation.

== Cast ==
- Betty Burgess as Judith Avery
- Jack La Rue as Smiles Badolio
- Matty Kemp as Toby Locke
- Guinn "Big Boy" Williams as Happy Crofton
- Lloyd Hughes as Doctor Craig Mitchell
- Anthony Orlando as Louie Badolio
- Sheila Terry as Rita Avery
- Bryant Washburn as Joe Travis
- Donald Kirke as Mr. Twitchett
- Harry Holman as Justice of Peace
- Edward Keene as District Attorney
- Norma Taylor as Miss Farnsworth

== Reception ==
Billboard wrote that it was "a powerful illustration that crime does not pay". Variety's review described the film as featuring "The loan-shark racket framed in an undistinguished production" and as "Imperial's contribution to the gangster cycle." It noted, "It provides an hour's entertainment for fans with time to kill who do not care how they kill it.... Bright spots in the production are Jack La Rue and Matty Kemp, standouts in unsympathetic parts, and Betty Burgess as the femme lead. La Rue's strong personality and intensity as a strong-arm guy practically dominates the entire proceedings... Story progresses in routine fashion until the melodramatic climax where Kemp is cornered in his hideout after fleeing gang vengeance... Action fans who like plenty of gun-play will get it here". The New York Daily News rated it two stars, stating in its review that "Matty Kemp tries desperately to give a fine performance in a film distinctly amateurish." The Film Daily stated that the film "rates weak with amateur script and direction" and called the photography "fair".

== Bibliography ==
- Pitts, Michael R. Poverty Row Studios, 1929–1940. McFarland & Company, 2005.
