= The Devil Horse (1926 film) =

1926 film

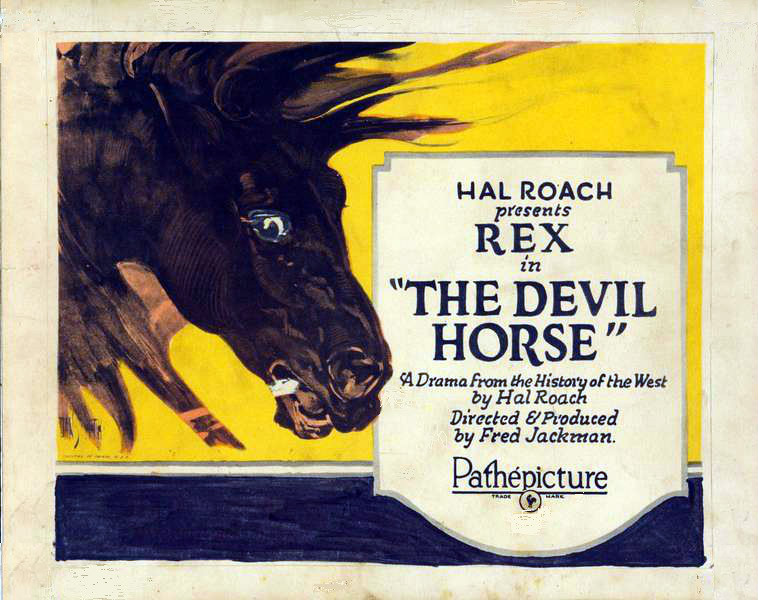
- Lobby card with Rex
- Directed by: Fred Jackman
- Story by: Hal Roach
- Starring: Yakima Canutt; Gladys McConnell; Bob Kortman; Roy Clements
- Cinematography: Floyd Jackman; George Stevens
- Edited by: Carl Hamm
- Production company: Hal Roach Studios
- Distributed by: Pathé Exchange
- Release date: September 12, 1926
- Running time: 6 reels
- Country: United States
- Language: Silent (English intertitles)

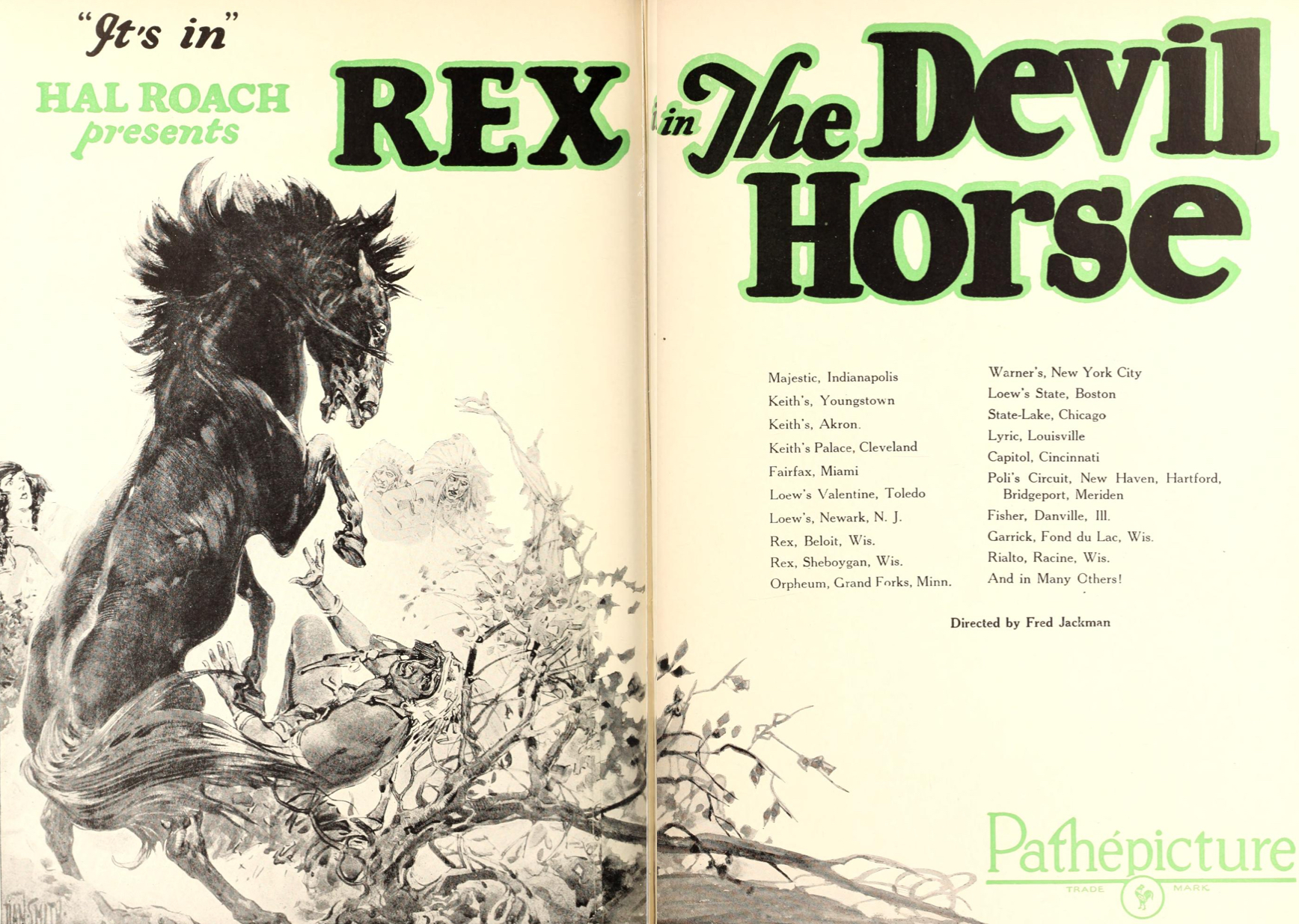
The Devil Horse ad in Motion Picture News, 1926

The Devil Horse is a 1926 American silent Western film directed by Fred Jackman. The film survives.

== Plot ==
In 1874 Montana, Native Americans attack a group of settlers, leaving a young Dave Carson and a colt named Rex as the only survivors. Rex is tortured by two Indians, but he escapes. The two later grow up, with Rex becoming a stallion who tramples Indians to death and acquiring the nickname "The Devil Horse." Carson becomes an army scout who is stationed at a fort commanded by Major Morrow. Carson and the Major's daughter Marion meet at a creek but, a group of Indians led by Prowling Wolf kidnaps Carson in a failed attempt to kidnap Marion to make her his wife, but she escapes. Rex, remembering Carson from his earlier years, frees him, and the two become friends. Prowling Wolf goes to the fort, and supplies Major Morrow with false information in another attempt to make Marion vulnerable enough to kidnap her. He is successful this time. However, Carson, Rex, and Major Morrow rescue her. The Indians attack the fort the next day. The army puts up a good fight, but it appears they may lose after they run low on ammunition. Carson and Rex are tasked with the dangerous task of retrieving more from a wagon train some distance away. During the mission, Morrow quarrels with Prowling Wolf who knocks him unconscious. Rex then tramples Prowling Wolf to death. Just as the Indians begin to infiltrate the fort, Rex, Carson, and the Wagon train make it back in time to scare the Indians off.

== Cast ==
- Yakima Canutt as Dave Carson
- Gladys McConnell as Marion Marrow
- Bob Kortman as Prowling Wolf
- Roy Clements as Major Morrow
- Fred Jackson as young Dave Carson
