= Coronado (1935 film) =

1935 film by Norman Z. McLeod

- Theatrical release poster
- Directed by: Norman Z. McLeod
- Screenplay by: Don Hartman; Frank Butler
- Story by: Brian Hooker; Don Hartman
- Produced by: William LeBaron
- Starring: Johnny Downs; Betty Burgess; Jack Haley; Andy Devine
- Cinematography: Gilbert Warrenton
- Edited by: Hugh Bennett
- Music by: John Leipold
- Production company: Paramount Pictures
- Distributed by: Paramount Pictures
- Release date: November 29, 1935
- Running time: 77 minutes
- Country: United States
- Language: English

Coronado is a 1935 American comedy film directed by Norman Z. McLeod and written by Don Hartman and Frank Butler. The film stars Johnny Downs Betty Burgess, Jack Haley, Andy Devine, Leon Errol, Alice White and Eddy Duchin. The film was released on November 29, 1935, by Paramount Pictures.

== Plot ==
Johnny Marvin, a wealthy and mischievous young man, arrives with his parents at the luxurious Hotel Coronado in Southern California. To keep Johnny occupied, the hotel manager enlists bandleader Eddie Duchin to involve Johnny in the hotel's orchestra and persuades singer June Wray to perform one of Johnny's compositions.

June, living modestly with her father Otto, mistakes Johnny for a struggling songwriter. She befriends him, buys him a meal, and introduces him to her sister, Violet, and Violet's new husband, Chuck Hornbostel. Unaware of Johnny's true identity, June advocates for his inclusion in the band. Upon discovering his affluent background, she feels deceived and distances herself.

Meanwhile, Otto and Johnny's father, Walter Marvin, conspire to separate their children by highlighting their differing social statuses. During a hotel performance, Otto disrupts the show, leading to a misunderstanding that strains Johnny and June's relationship. At the same time, Chuck and his friend Pinky Falls venture into Mexico to procure a wedding ring for Violet but end up jailed. Johnny impersonates a doctor to secure Chuck's release and returns in time for the hotel's musical revue. The film concludes with misunderstandings resolved and relationships mended.

== Cast ==
- Johnny Downs as Johnny Marvin
- Betty Burgess as June Wray
- Jack Haley as Chuck Hornbostel
- Andy Devine as Pinky Falls
- Leon Errol as Otto Wray
- Alice White as Violet Wray Hornbostel
- Eddy Duchin as Eddie
- Eddy Duchin's Orchestra as Eddie's Orchestra
- Jameson Thomas as Carlton
- Berton Churchill as Walter Marvin
- Nella Walker as Mrs. Gloria Marvin
- Julie Bishop as Barbara Forrest
- James Burke as Slug Moran
- James B. Carson as Marine
