= From Headquarters (1929 film) =

1929 film

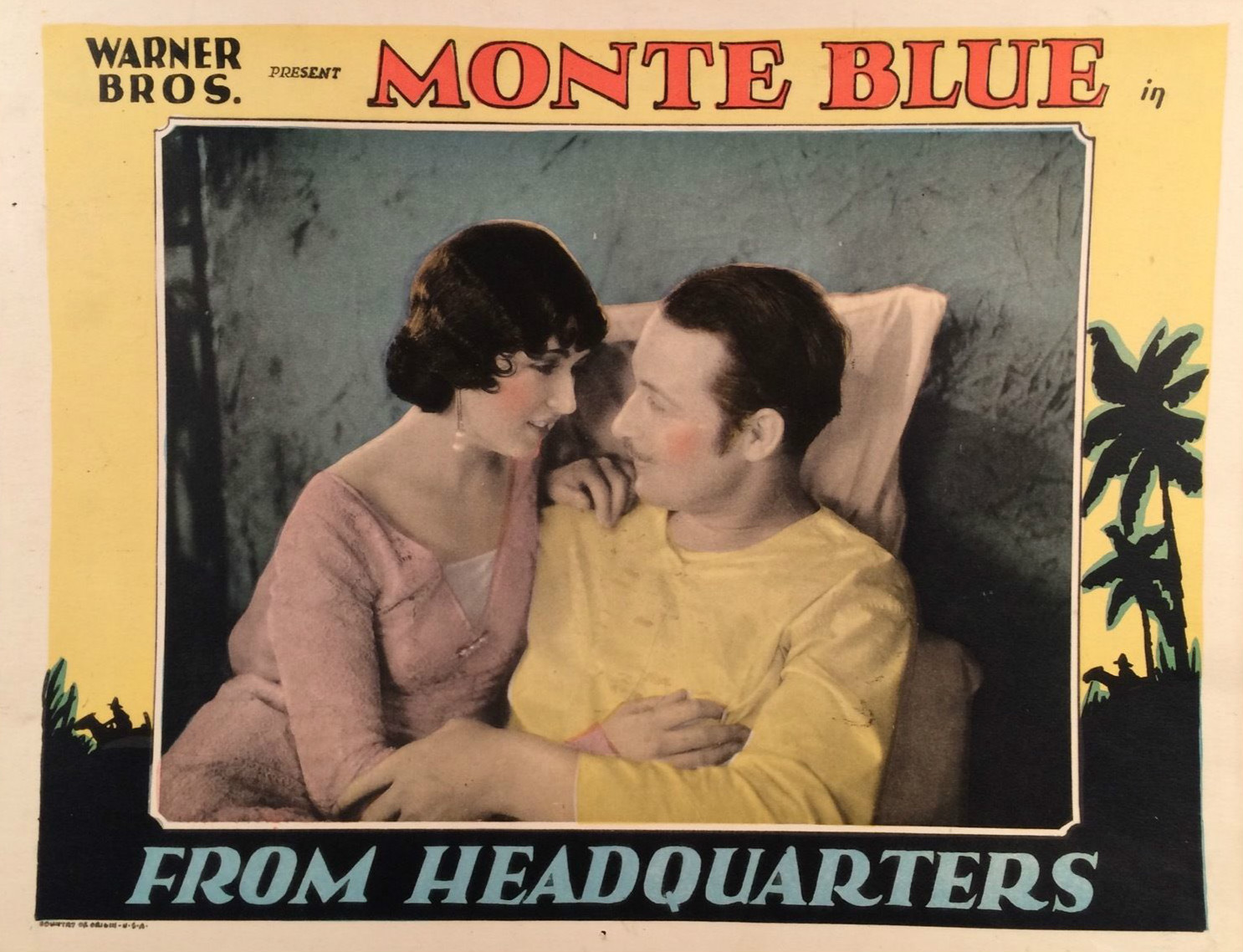
- Lobby card
- Directed by: Howard Bretherton
- Written by: Harvey Gates (continuity, dialogue, and scenario); Samuel Hartridge (story); Francis Powers (continuity and dialogue)
- Starring: Monte Blue; Guinn "Big Boy" Williams; Gladys Brockwell; Lionel Belmore; Henry B. Walthall
- Cinematography: William Rees
- Edited by: Harold McLernon
- Music by: Alois Reiser
- Production company: Warner Bros. Pictures
- Distributed by: Warner Bros. Pictures
- Release dates: April 27, 1929 (sound version); June 6, 1929 (silent version)
- Running time: 70 minutes; 5 reels
- Country: United States
- Languages: Sound (Part-Talkie); English Intertitles

From Headquarters is a 1929 American sound part-talkie adventure drama film directed by Howard Bretherton and starring Monte Blue, Guinn "Big Boy" Williams, Gladys Brockwell, Lionel Belmore, and Henry B. Walthall. In addition to sequences with audible dialogue or talking sequences, the film features a synchronized musical score and sound effects along with English intertitles. According to the film review in Variety, 60 percent of the total running time featured dialogue. The soundtrack was recorded using the Vitaphone sound-on-disc system. The film was released by Warner Bros. Pictures on April 27, 1929.

== Plot ==
Under command of Major Evans, a party of U.S. Marines lands at the coastal town of San Marealo, in a Latin-American republic. Evans visits the American Vice-Consul, Señor Carroles, and learns that a party of Americans, including a woman, Mary Dyer, has been lost in the interior at the Rosita Mine. Carroles informs him that “Happy” Smith, an American soldier of fortune, is the only man who can guide the rescue expedition. Happy, who has lived in the region for years and is loved by Carroles’ daughter Innocencia, has resumed his heavy drinking since the arrival of the U.S. warship.

In a saloon, Happy provokes the ire of a party of Marines, including Gunnery Sergeant Wilmer. Brought before Major Evans, Happy demands—and receives—$5,000 for his services. He sets off with six Marines, including Wilmer. Soon after leaving San Marealo, they discover the executed bodies of Happy's four former mercenary companions, killed for deserting a local rebel army because they did not receive their pay.

The rescue party loses three Marines in a guerilla attack. Upon reaching the mine, they find that all the men of the missing group are dead, and only Mary Dyer survives, having eluded the bandits and given birth to a child. Mary and Happy recognize each other. She dies shortly after, whispering her story to Sergeant Wilmer. Based on her testimony, Wilmer—who had already come to blows with Happy—places him under arrest for allegedly stealing company funds and deserting the Marines at Norfolk, Virginia, nine years earlier.

Happy and the three remaining Marines begin the return trip with Mary's baby, who survives on milk from a goat found near the ruined mine. The journey is brutal: Ryan is shot by guerillas and Murphy dies in a swamp.

A month passes without news, and Major Evans is preparing a new search mission when Carroles brings him the $5,000 left behind by Happy, who had arranged that it be divided among the families of any Marines killed during the mission. Just then, Happy and Wilmer stagger into town, delirious but alive—and still carrying the baby.

Later, Major Evans explains to Happy that Mary Dyer had told Wilmer the truth: that Happy had been a Captain of Marines who loved her. Nine years earlier, her husband had stolen the company funds, and Happy had taken the blame to protect her happiness, making it appear he was the thief and deserting the service.

Major Evans suggests the Marines would welcome Happy back, but Happy declines. He chooses instead to remain in San Marealo with Innocencia and raise Mary Dyer's child.

== Cast ==
- Monte Blue as Happy Smith
- Guinn "Big Boy" Williams as Gunnery Sgt. Wilmer (as Guinn Williams)
- Gladys Brockwell as Mary Dyer
- Lionel Belmore as Señor Carroles
- Henry B. Walthall as Buffalo Bill Ryan
- Eddie Gribbon as Pvt. Murphy
- Ethlyne Clair as Innocencia
- Pat Hartigan as Spike Connelly
- John Kelly as O'Farrell
- Otto Lederer as Bugs McGuire
- William Irving as Fritz
- Pat Somerset as Hendricks
- Joseph W. Girard as Major (as Joseph Girard)
- Edmund Breese in a bit part (uncredited)

== Preservation ==
The film is now considered lost.

== See also ==
- List of early sound feature films (1926–1929)
