= No Man's Law =

1927 film

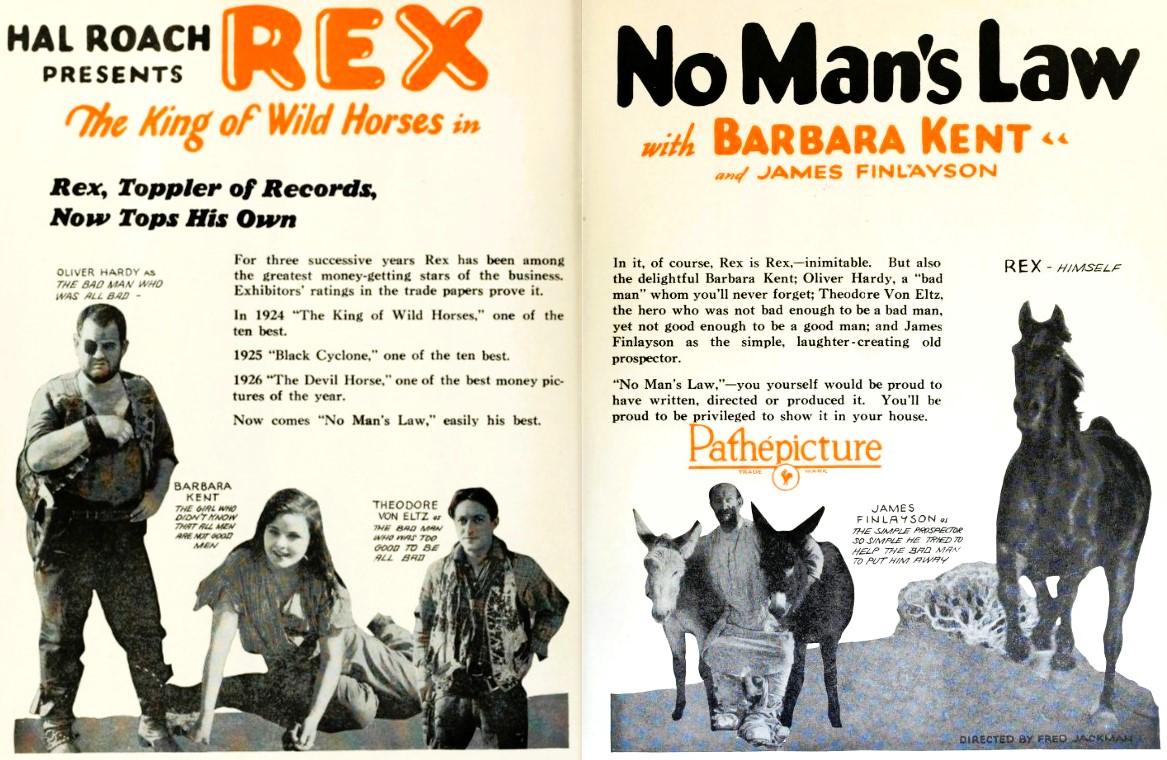
- Advertisement
- Directed by: Fred Jackman
- Written by: Frank Butler
- Story by: F. Richard Jones
- Starring: Rex the King of Wild Horses; Barbara Kent; James Finlayson; Oliver Hardy; Theodore Von Eltz
- Cinematography: Floyd Jackman; George Stevens
- Edited by: Richard Currier
- Distributed by: Pathé Exchange, Inc.
- Release date: May 1, 1927
- Running time: 1 hour
- Country: United States
- Language: Silent with English intertitles

The film.

No Man's Law is a 1927 American silent Western film directed by Fred Jackman, starring Rex the King of Wild Horses, and featuring Oliver Hardy as a lustful villain.

== Cast ==
- Rex the King of Wild Horses as Nobody's Horse
- Barbara Kent as Toby Belcher
- James Finlayson as Jack Belcher
- Oliver Hardy as Sharkey Nye
- Theodore Von Eltz as Spider O'Day

== Production ==
No Man's Law has scenes, including in flashback, of Barbara Kent appearing to dive and swim in the nude, but she is actually wearing a flesh-colored moleskin bathing suit. That footage created a minor scandal at the time, drawing special attention from review boards in various communities throughout the country. In June 1927 in New York City, the entertainment trade publication Variety gave the production an overall favorable rating but predicted trouble for that portion of the film: "Miss Kent looks and acts well. A couple of the almost nude scenes will not stand much chance with the censors out of town."

The original working title of the film was The Avenging Stallion. Filming took place on Hal Roach's Big Horn Ranch in Nevada.

== Preservation ==
Prints of No Man's Law are located in the collections of CINEMATEK, George Eastman Museum Motion Picture Collection, and UCLA Film and Television Archive.
