= The Law of the Wild =

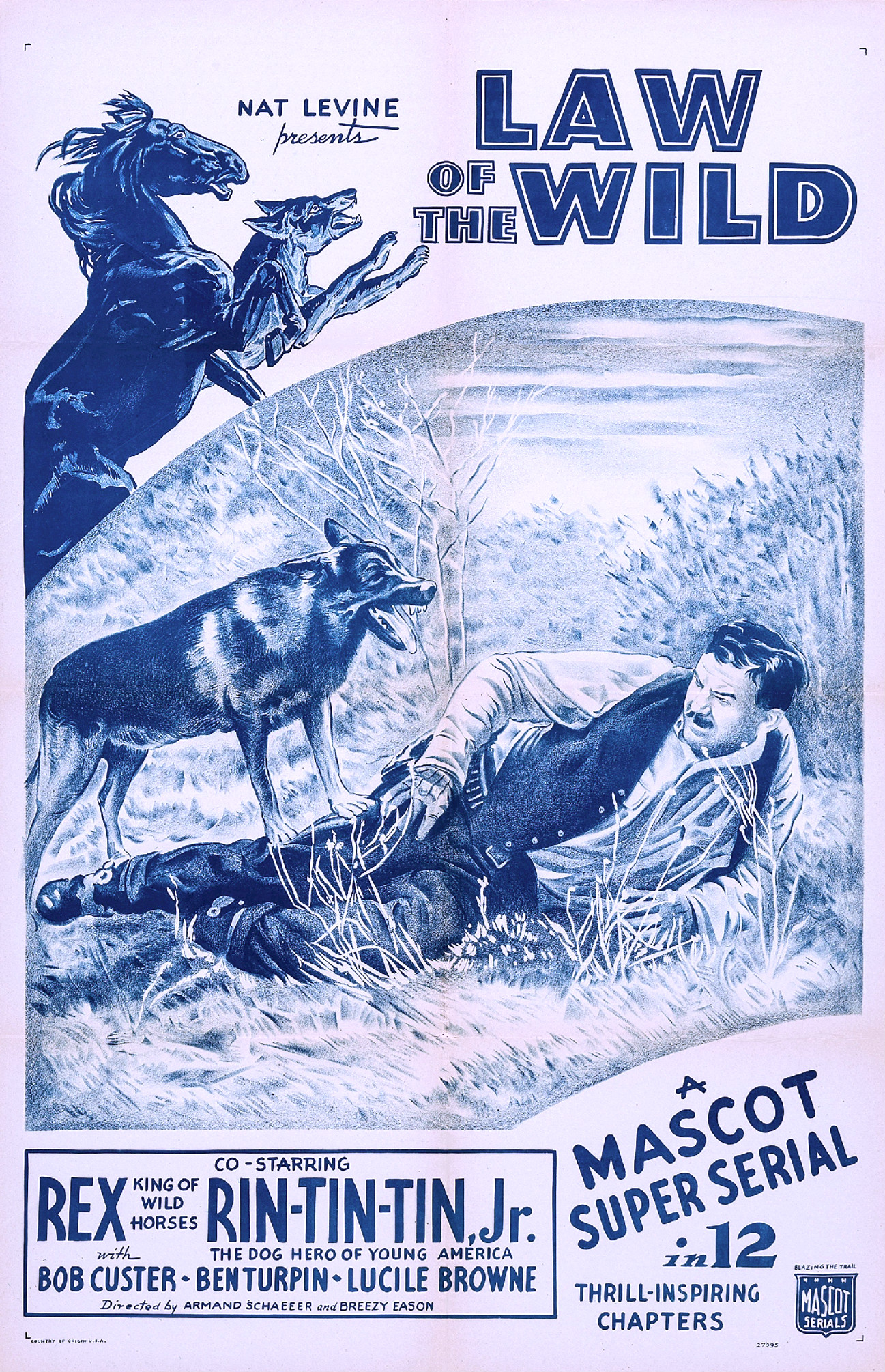
- Film poster
- Directed by: B. Reeves Eason; Armand Schaefer; Louis Germonprez (asst.); George Webster (asst.); William Witney (asst.)
- Written by: Ford Beebe; B. Reeves Eason; Sherman L. Lowe; Al Martin; John Rathmell
- Produced by: Nat Levine
- Starring: Rex King of the Wild Horses; Rin Tin Tin, Jr. Ben Turpin; Bob Custer; Lucile Browne; Richard Cramer
- Cinematography: Ernest Miller; William Nobles
- Edited by: Wyndham Gittens; Earl Turner
- Music by: Lee Zahler; David Broekman
- Distributed by: Mascot Pictures
- Release date: 1934
- Running time: 12 chapters (225 minutes)
- Country: United States
- Language: English

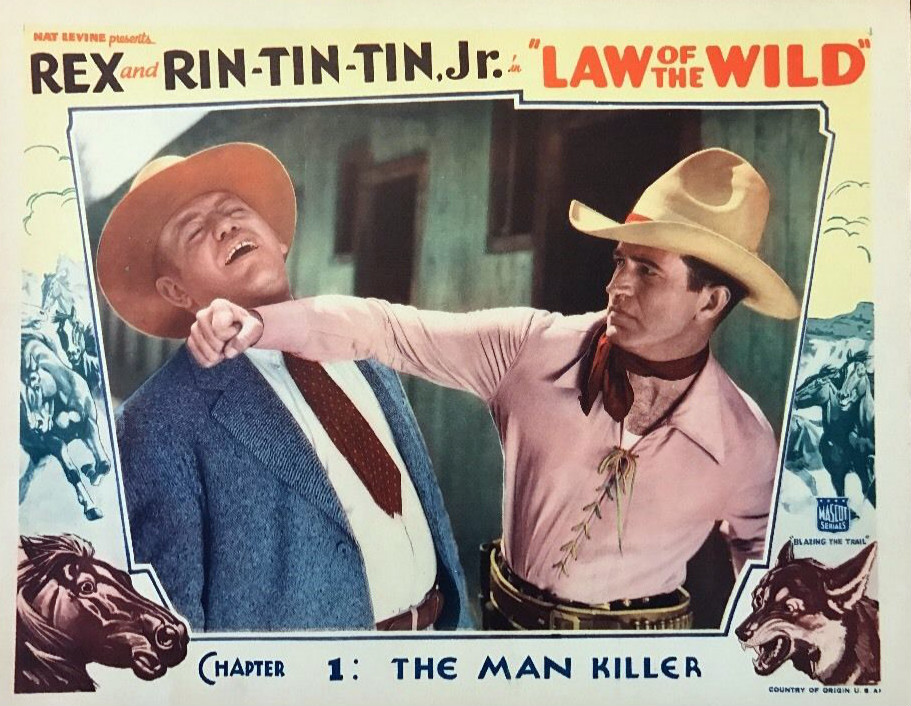
Richard Cramer and Bob Custer

The Law of the Wild is a 1934 American western serial film produced by Nat Levine, directed by B. Reeves Eason and Armand Schaefer, distributed by Mascot Pictures, and starring two famous animal stars, Rex the Wonder Horse and Rin Tin Tin Jr. as the serial's two leads. Bob Custer played hero John Sheldon, Richard Cramer played villain Frank Nolan, and famed comedian Ben Turpin co-starred as the comic relief sidekick Henry.

== Plot ==
John Sheldon is falsely accused by Frank Nolan of killing Lou Salters. Nolan steals Sheldon's horse Rex while Sheldon is in jail, with plans to ride him in a big horse race. Sheldon's friend Alice and her comedic sidekick Henry rescue the horse with the aid of Rin Tin Tin Jr., and Alice rides him in the race instead. The winnings from the race are used to pay for Sheldon's legal defense.

== Cast ==
- Rex King of the Wild Horses as himself
- Rin Tin Tin, Jr. as Rinty
- Bob Custer as John Sheldon
- Richard Cramer as Frank Nolan, the villain
- Lucile Browne as Alice Ingram
- Ben Turpin as Henry, Alice Ingram's humorous sidekick
- Ernie Adams as Raymond, one of Nolan's henchman
- Edmund Cobb as Jim Luger, one of Nolan's henchman
- Slim Whitaker as Mack, one of Nolan's henchman
- Richard Alexander as Lewis R. 'Lou' Salters, murder victim
- Jack Rockwell as the Sheriff
- George Chesebro as Parks, one of Nolan's henchman

== Episodes ==
1. The Man Killer
2. The Battle of the Strong
3. The Cross-eyed Goony
4. Avenging Fangs
5. A Dead Man's Hand
6. Horse-thief Justice
7. The Death Stampede
8. The Canyon of Calamity
9. Robbers Roost
10. King of the Range
11. Winner Take All
12. The Grand Sweepstakes

_{Source:}

== See also ==
- List of film serials by year
- List of film serials by studio
- List of films about horses
- List of films about horse racing

Preceded by Burn 'Em Up Barnes (1934)	Mascot Serial; The Law of the Wild (1934)	Succeeded by Mystery Mountain (1934)
