= Glenn H. Randall Sr. =

American horse trainer

- Glenn H. Randall Sr. and Trigger
- Born: December 25, 1908; Melbeta, Nebraska, United States
- Died: May 5, 1992 (aged 83); Newhall, Santa Clarita, California
- Occupation: horse trainer
- Years active: 1951-1992
- Children: 2

Glenn H. Randall Sr. (1908-1992) was a professional horse trainer, best known for training the horse Trigger for the television series The Roy Rogers Show. He developed over 30 hand commands to which the palomino responded. Randall Sr. also trained Gene Autry's horse Champion the Wonder Horse.

His other work as a horse trainer for television and film includes the 1956 film Stranger at My Door and the 1959 film Ben-Hur. Starting months before photography began, he trained around 40 horses for Ben-Hur, including the four whites (Altair, Rigel, Antares, and Aldebran) that Charlton Heston drove in the chariot race. Glenn Sr. later worked as a wrangler on the 1979 film The Black Stallion and its 1983 sequel The Black Stallion Returns.

His son Glenn H. Randall Jr., also known as "J.R.", was also a horse trainer as well as a stunt performer, stunt coordinator, and second unit director who was active from 1959 to 2000. Randall Sr.'s son Corky Randall was also involved in the industry.

== Filmography ==
- The Roy Rogers Show (101 episodes, 1951-1957), horse trainer
- Stranger at My Door (1956), horse trainer (uncredited)
- Ben-Hur (1959), horse trainer (uncredited)
- Toby Tyler or 10 Weeks with a Circus (1960), horse trainer (uncredited)
- Haksaw (1971), horse trainer
- The Black Stallion (1979), wrangler
- The Black Stallion Returns (1983), wrangler (uncredited)
