= The Adventures of Rex and Rinty =

- Directed by: Ford Beebe; B. Reeves Eason
- Written by: John Rathmell; Barney A. Sarecky
- Produced by: Nat Levine & Barney A. Sarecky
- Starring: Rin Tin Tin, Jr. Rex
- Cinematography: William Nobles; Brandon Trost
- Edited by: Richard Fantl; Joseph H. Lewis
- Music by: Jean Aberbach; Charles Dunworth
- Distributed by: Mascot Pictures
- Release date: August 1, 1935
- Running time: 12 chapters (229 min)
- Country: United States
- Language: English

The Adventures of Rex and Rinty, Chapter 1: The God Horse of Sujan

The Adventures of Rex and Rinty (1935) is a Mascot film serial directed by Ford Beebe and B. Reeves Eason and starring the equine actor Rex ("The King of Wild Horses") and canine actor Rin Tin Tin, Jr.

== Cast ==
- Rex the king of wild horses as himself
- Rin Tin Tin, Jr. as Rinty
- Kane Richmond as Frank Bradley
- Norma Taylor as Dorothy Bruce
- Mischa Auer as Tanaga
- Smiley Burnette as Jensen
- Harry Woods as Crawford
- Pedro Regas as Pasha
- Hooper Atchley as Debor
- Wheeler Oakman as Henchman Wheeler
- Victor Potel as Kinso, Royal Guard Commander
- Allan Cavan as Mr. Bruce

== Additional crew ==
- Story: B. Reeves Easton, Maurice Geraghty, Ray Trampe
- Musical Director: Lee Zahler
- Supervising Editor: Joseph H. Lewis
- Sound Effects Editor: Roy Granville
- Sound Engineer: Clifford A. Ruberg (as Cliff Ruberg)
- Stunts: Tracy Layne, Ted Mapes, Eddie Parker, Joe Yrigoyen (all uncredited)

== Chapter titles ==
1. God Horse of Sujan
2. Sport of Kings
3. Fangs of Flame
4. Homewards Bound
5. Babes in the Woods
6. Dead Man's Tale
7. End of the Road
8. A Dog's Devotion
9. The Stranger's Recall
10. The Siren of Death
11. New Gods for Old
12. Primitive Justice

_{Source:}

== See also ==
- List of films about horses
- List of American films of 1935

Preceded by The Miracle Rider (1935)	Mascot Serial; The Adventures of Rex and Rinty (1935)	Succeeded by The Fighting Marines (1935)
