= Stranger at My Door (1956 film) =

1956 film by William Witney

- Directed by: William Witney
- Screenplay by: Barry Shipman
- Story by: Barry Shipman
- Produced by: Herbert J. Yates; Sidney Picker
- Starring: Macdonald Carey; Patricia Medina; Skip Homeier
- Cinematography: Bud Thackery
- Edited by: Howard A. Smith
- Music by: R. Dale Butts
- Color process: Black and white
- Production company: Republic Pictures
- Distributed by: Republic Pictures
- Release date: April 6, 1956
- Running time: 85 minutes
- Country: United States
- Language: English

Stranger at My Door is a 1956 American western drama film directed by William Witney and starring Macdonald Carey, Patricia Medina and Skip Homeier. It was produced and distributed by Republic Pictures.

== Plot ==
Outlaw Clay Anderson and his gang rob the town bank and flee in different directions. Clay's horse gives out and he is forced to hide at a nearby farm. Clay soon discovers that the farm belongs to preacher Hollis Jarret, the preacher's son and new wife. The preacher lets Clay stay at the farm, his faith leading him to try to convince the outlaw to turn over a new leaf.

== Cast ==
- Macdonald Carey as Hollis Jarret
- Patricia Medina as Peg Jarret
- Skip Homeier as Clay Anderson
- Stephen Wootton as 'Dodie' Jarret
- Louis Jean Heydt as Sheriff John Tatum
- Howard Wright as 'Doc' Parks
- Slim Pickens as Ben Silas
- Malcolm Atterbury as Rev. Hastings

== Legacy ==
Quentin Tarantino called it a "classic" with "the most amazing and terrifying breaking-the- unbreakable-horse sequence in the history of western cinema, including Monte Walsh. Witney became so renowned in the industry for this sequence that when he started directing western TV shows, he was usually brought in to helm their breaking-the-unbreakable-horse episode."
