= King of the Wild Horses (1933 film) =

1933 film

- Directed by: Earl Haley
- Written by: Fred Myton
- Based on: story by Earl Haley
- Starring: Rex the Wonder Horse
- Cinematography: Benjamin H. Kline
- Edited by: Clarence Kolster
- Production company: Columbia Pictures
- Distributed by: Columbia Pictures
- Release date: November 10, 1933
- Running time: 62 minutes
- Country: United States
- Language: English

King of the Wild Horses is a 1933 American Columbia Pictures Western film directed by Earl Haley. It was produced and released by Columbia Pictures with stunts by Yakima Canutt.

== Cast ==
- Rex the Wonder Horse as Rex
- Lady the Horse as The Mare
- Marquis the Horse as Rex's Rival
- William Janney as Two Feathers
- Dorothy Appleby as Napeeta
- Wallace MacDonald as Gorman
- Harry Semels as John Foster
- Ford West as Dr. Anderson
- Art Mix as Haley
- Charles LeMoyne as a henchman(*uncredited)

== Preservation status ==
- A print is held in the Library of Congress collection.
