= The King of Wild Horses =

1924 film

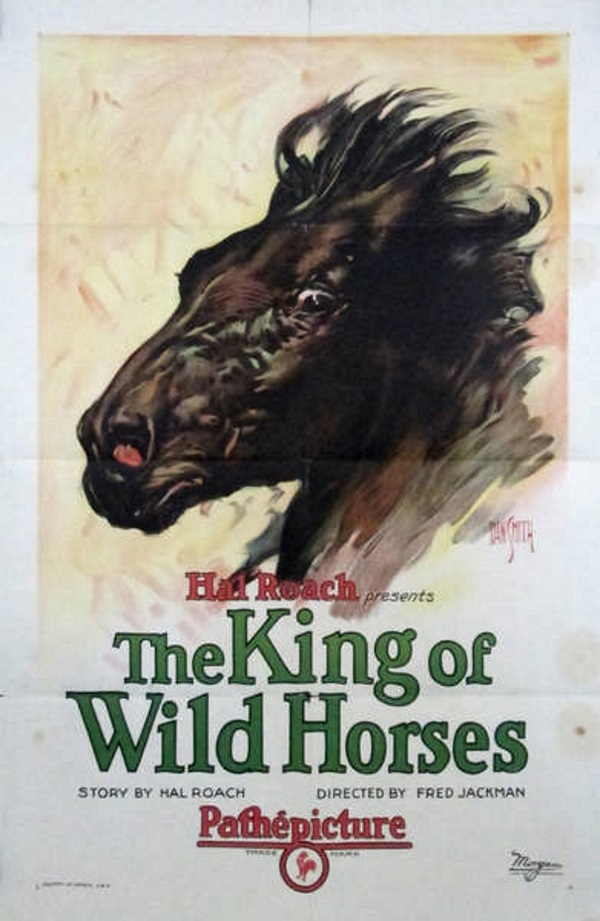
- Directed by: Fred Jackman
- Written by: Carl Himm
- Story by: Hal Roach
- Produced by: Hal Roach
- Starring: Rex the Horse; Edna Murphy; Charley Chase
- Cinematography: Floyd Jackman
- Distributed by: Pathé Exchange
- Release date: April 13, 1924
- Running time: 50 minutes
- Country: United States
- Language: Silent (English intertitles)

The King of Wild Horses is a 1924 American silent Western film directed by Fred Jackman. It stars Edna Murphy, Rex the wonder horse, and Charley Chase. It was written and produced by Hal Roach and released through Pathé Exchange.

== Plot ==
As described in a film magazine review, the Black, by right of might, is undisputed leader of a band of wild horses. By his intelligence and agility, he protects the herd and eludes various pursuers. The Fielding ranch is under the charge of Wade Galvin, a villainous foreman, who has involved Fielding's weakling son in a cattle stealing escapade. Billy Blair, a cowpuncher, has two consuming passions. One is his love for Mary Fielding and the other is his desire to capture The Black. His perseverance is rewarded, for he wins both the young woman and horse. All three cooperate in frustrating further villainy on the part of Galvin, the foreman, and in bringing him to justice.

== Cast ==
- Rex the Horse as The Black
- Edna Murphy as Mary Fielding
- Léon Bary as Billy Blair
- Charley Chase as Boyd Fielding (credited as Charles Parrott)
- Pat Hartigan as Wade Galvin
- Sidney De Gray as John Fielding
- Frank Butler (uncredited)
- Sidney D'Albrook (uncredited)

== Preservation ==
A copy of The King of Wild Horses is preserved in the Library of Congress film collection and the George Eastman Museum Motion Picture Collection. The Library's copy is the likely source for most DVDs.
