= Edwin B. DuPar =

- Born: Edwin Balch DuPar; November 24, 1885; Plum Creek, Nebraska, U.S.
- Died: June 4, 1961 (aged 75); Los Angeles, California, U.S.
- Occupation: Cinematographer
- Years active: 1922–1961
- Spouse: Helen Monehan (m. 1923)

Edwin B. DuPar (November 24, 1885 – June 4, 1961) was an American cinematographer, special effects technician, and film director who worked on hundreds of projects during his lengthy career in Hollywood, beginning in the early 1920s.

== Biography ==
Edwin was born in Plum, Creek, Nebraska, to Francis DuPar and Luella Scarff. The family soon relocated to Salida, Colorado, where Francis DuPar was elected mayor, before settling permanently in Monrovia, California. As a young man, Edwin forged a career in vaudeville in Chicago.

DuPar was an early member of the American Society of Cinematographers. At the dawn of the sound era, he was the chief Vitaphone cameraman in Hollywood, and he was the person who is credited with devising the means for synchronizing action and sound. In 1929 Warners reassigned him to its Vitaphone short-subject studio in Brooklyn, New York, where he became Vitaphone's chief cameraman. He photographed dozens of Vitaphone shorts, including two-reel comedies with either Roscoe Arbuckle, Shemp Howard, Jack Haley, Harry Gribbon, George Givot, or Red Skelton, and musicals with Lillian Roth, Hal Le Roy, or various popular orchestras before returning to Burbank in 1935. In 1940 he became Warners' resident special-effects technician, creating photographic effects for feature films. He returned to full-time director of photography in 1950, and helped pioneer WarnerColor, the studio's own variation of Eastmancolor.

Edwin DuPar was also very active in the Warner Bros. television division between 1958 and 1961, photographing 10 different series including 77 Sunset Strip, Maverick, and Hawaiian Eye.

== Selected filmography ==
- Gold, Glory and Custer (1964), a two-part television production
- The Redeemer (1959)
- From the Earth to the Moon (1958)
- The Lone Ranger (1958)
- Paris Follies of 1956 (1955)
- Target Zero (1955)
- The Bounty Hunter (1954)
- Ring of Fear (1954)
- The Eddie Cantor Story (1953)
- The System (1953)
- She's Back on Broadway (1953)
- Springfield Rifle (1952)
- The Miracle of Our Lady of Fatima (1952)
- The Lion and the Horse (1952)
- The Tanks Are Coming (1951)
- Inside the Walls of Folsom Prison (1951)
- I Was a Communist for the F.B.I. (1951)
- Breakthrough (1950)
- Speed Devils (1935)
- That's the Spirit (1933)
- Die Königsloge (1929)
- Queen of the Night Clubs (1929)
- Lights of New York (1928)
- A Race for Life (1928)
- If I Were Single (1927)
- A Dog of the Regiment (1927)
- Tracked by the Police (1927)
- White Flannels (1927)
- The Fortune Hunter (1927)
- The Better 'Ole (1926)
- A Hero of the Big Snows (1926)
- The Sap (1926)
- The Night Cry (1926)
- Ship of Souls (1925)
- Clash of the Wolves (1925)
- The Love Hour (1925)
- George Washington Jr. (1924)
- The Country Kid (1923)
- Main Street (1923)
- Little Church Around the Corner (1923)
- Heroes of the Street (1922)
- The Beautiful and Damned (1922)
