= Rin Tin Tin =

German Shepherd actor (1918–1932)

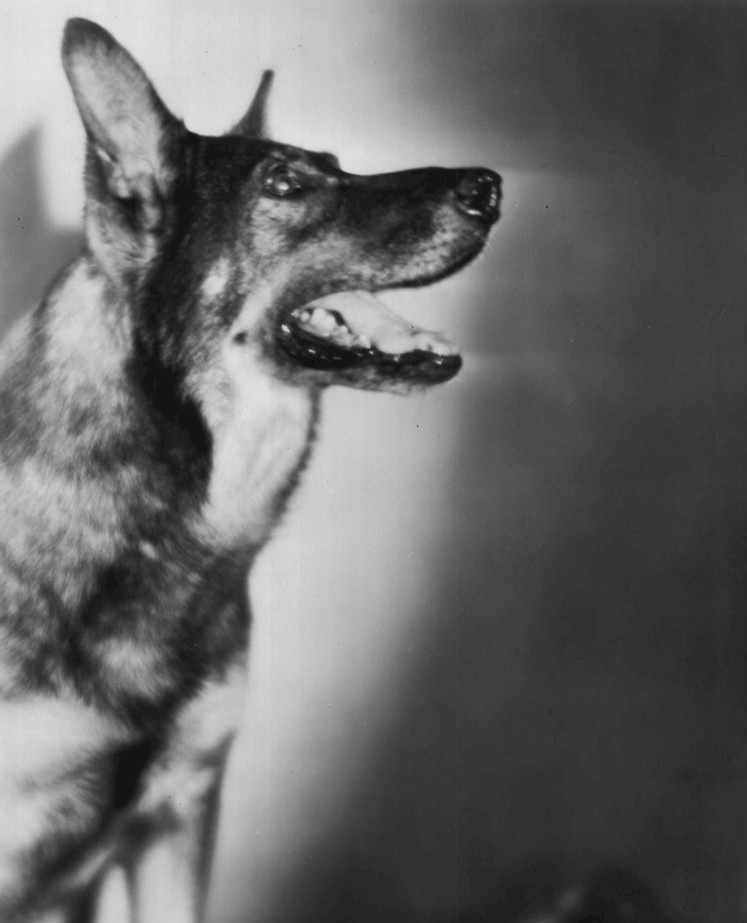
- Rin Tin Tin in the film Frozen River (1929)
- Other name: Rin-Tin-Tin
- Species: Canis familiaris
- Breed: German Shepherd
- Sex: Male
- Born: October 10, 1918; Flirey, France
- Died: August 10, 1932 (aged 13); Los Angeles, California, US
- Resting place: Cimetière des Chiens et Autres Animaux Domestiques (Dog Cemetery) in Asnières-sur-Seine, a suburb northwest of Paris, France.
- Occupation: Actor
- Years active: 1922-1931
- Owner: Lee Duncan
- Mate: Nanette II
- Offspring: At least 48
- Weight: 34–43 kg (75–95 lb)
- Height: 60–66 cm (24–26 in)

Rin Tin Tin or Rin-Tin-Tin (October 10, 1918 – August 10, 1932) was a male German Shepherd born in Flirey, France, that became an international star in motion pictures. He was rescued from a World War I battlefield by an American soldier, Lee Duncan, who nicknamed him "Rinty". Duncan trained Rin Tin Tin and obtained silent film work for the dog. Rin Tin Tin was an immediate box-office success and went on to appear in 27 Hollywood films, gaining worldwide fame. Along with the earlier canine film star Strongheart, Rin Tin Tin was responsible for greatly increasing the popularity of German Shepherd dogs as family pets. The immense profitability of his films contributed to the success of Warner Bros. studios and helped advance the career of Darryl F. Zanuck from screenwriter to producer and studio executive.

After the dog's only appearance in color (the 1929 musical revue The Show of Shows, in which he barks an introduction to a musical pageant), Warner Bros. dispensed with the services of both Rin Tin Tin and Lee Duncan. The studio was intent on promoting its "all-talking" stars, and silent-film personality Rin Tin Tin obviously could not speak. Undaunted, Duncan sought further film work for Rin Tin Tin and signed him with independent producer Nat Levine, who starred the dog in serials and feature films.

After Rin Tin Tin died in 1932, the name was given to several related German Shepherd dogs featured in fictional stories on film, radio, and television. Rin Tin Tin Jr. appeared in some serialized films, but was not as talented as his father. Rin Tin Tin III, said to be Rin Tin Tin's grandson, but probably only distantly related, helped promote the military use of dogs during World War II. Rin Tin Tin III also appeared in a film with child actor Robert Blake in 1947.

Duncan groomed Rin Tin Tin IV for the 1950s television series The Adventures of Rin Tin Tin, produced by Bert Leonard. The dog performed poorly in a screen test, though, so was replaced in the TV show by trainer Frank Barnes's dogs, primarily one named Flame Jr.', called JR, with the public led to believe otherwise. The TV show Rin Tin Tin was nominated for a PATSY Award in both 1958 and 1959, but did not win.

After Duncan died in 1960, the screen property of Rin Tin Tin passed to his business partner Bert Leonard, who worked on further adaptations such as the 1988–1993 Canadian-made TV show Katts and Dog, which was called Rin Tin Tin: K-9 Cop in the US and Rintintin Junior in France. Following Leonard's death in 2006, his lawyer James Tierney made the 2007 children's film Finding Rin Tin Tin, an American–Bulgarian production based on Duncan's discovery of the dog in France. Meanwhile, a Rin Tin Tin memorabilia collection was being amassed by Texas resident Jannettia Propps Brodsgaard, who had purchased several direct descendant dogs from Duncan beginning with Rinty Tin Tin Brodsgaard in 1957. Brodsgaard bred the dogs to keep the bloodline. Brodsgaard's granddaughter, Daphne Hereford, continued to build on the tradition and bloodline of Rin Tin Tin from 1988 to 2011; she was the first to trademark the name Rin Tin Tin, in 1993, and she bought the domain names rintintin.com and rintintin.net to establish a website. Hereford opened a short-lived Rin Tin Tin museum in Latexo, Texas, and passed the tradition to her daughter, Dorothy Yanchak, in 2011. The dog Rin Tin Tin XII, owned by Yanchak, takes part in public events to represent the Rin Tin Tin legacy.

== Origins ==
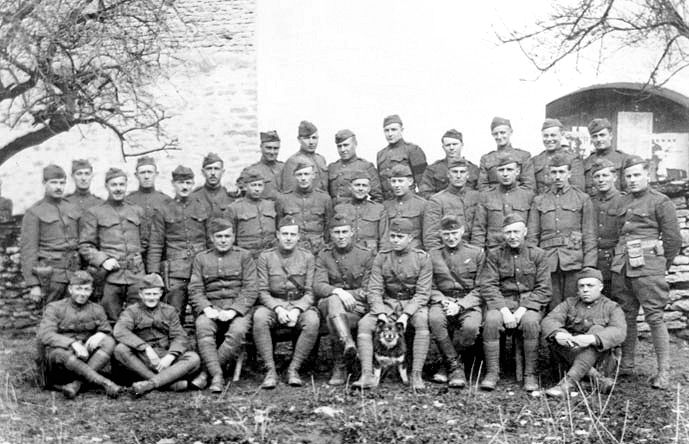
Officers and men of the 135th Aero Squadron with their mascot Rin Tin Tin shortly after his rescue as a puppy in 1918

Following advances made by American forces during the Battle of Saint-Mihiel, Corporal Lee Duncan, an armorer of the U.S. Army Air Service, was sent forward on September 15, 1918, to the small French village of Flirey to see if there was a suitable flying field available for his unit, the 135th Aero Squadron. The area had been subjected to aerial bombing and artillery fire, and Duncan found a severely damaged kennel, which had once supplied the Imperial German Army with German Shepherd dogs. The only dogs left alive in the kennel were a starving mother with a litter of five nursing puppies, their eyes still shut because they were less than a week old. Duncan rescued the dogs and brought them back to his unit.

When the puppies were weaned, he gave the mother to an officer and three of the litter to other soldiers, but he kept one male and one female puppy. He felt that these two dogs were symbols of his good luck. He dubbed them Rin Tin Tin and Nanette after a pair of good luck charms called Rintintin and Nénette that French children often gave to the American soldiers (the soldiers were usually told that Rintintin and Nénette were lucky lovers who had survived a bombing attack, but the original dolls had been designed by Francisque Poulbot before the war in late 1913 to look like Paris street urchins. Contrary to linguistic clues and popular usage, Poulbot said that Rintintin was the girl doll.). Duncan sensed that Nanette was the more intelligent of the two puppies.

In July 1919, Duncan snuck the dogs aboard a ship, taking him back to the US at the end of the war. When he got to Long Island, New York, for re-entry processing, he put his dogs in the care of a Hempstead breeder named Mrs. Leo Wanner, who trained police dogs. Nanette was diagnosed with pneumonia; as a replacement, the breeder gave Duncan another female German Shepherd puppy. Duncan travelled to California by rail with his dogs. While Duncan was travelling by train, Nanette died in Hempstead. As a memorial, Duncan named his new puppy Nanette II, but he called her Nanette. Duncan, Rin Tin Tin, and Nanette II settled at his home in Los Angeles. Rin Tin Tin was a dark sable color and had very dark eyes. Nanette II was much lighter in color.

An athletic silent film actor named Eugene Pallette was one of Duncan's friends. The two men enjoyed the outdoors; they took the dogs to the Sierras, where Pallette liked to hunt, while Duncan taught Rin Tin Tin various tricks. Duncan thought that his dog might win a few awards at dog shows, so would be a valuable source of puppies bred with Nanette for sale. In 1922, Duncan was a founding member of the Shepherd Dog Club of California, based in Los Angeles. At the club's first show, Rin Tin Tin showed his agility, but also demonstrated an aggressive temper, growling, barking, and snapping. It was a very poor performance, but the worst moment came afterward when Duncan was walking home. A heavy bundle of newspapers was thrown from a delivery truck and landed on the dog, breaking his left front leg. Duncan had the injured limb set in plaster, and he nursed the dog back to health for nine months.

Ten months after the fracture, the leg was healed and Rin Tin Tin was entered in a show for German Shepherd dogs in Los Angeles. Rin Tin Tin had learned to leap great heights. At the dog show while making a winning leap, he was filmed by Duncan's acquaintance Charley Jones, who had just developed a slow-motion camera. Seeing his dog being filmed, Duncan became convinced Rin Tin Tin could become the next Strongheart, a successful German Shepherd film dog that lived in his own full-sized stucco bungalow with its own street address in the Hollywood Hills, separate from the mansion of his owners, who lived a street away next to Roy Rogers. Duncan later wrote, "I was so excited over the film idea that I found myself thinking of it night and day."

== Career ==
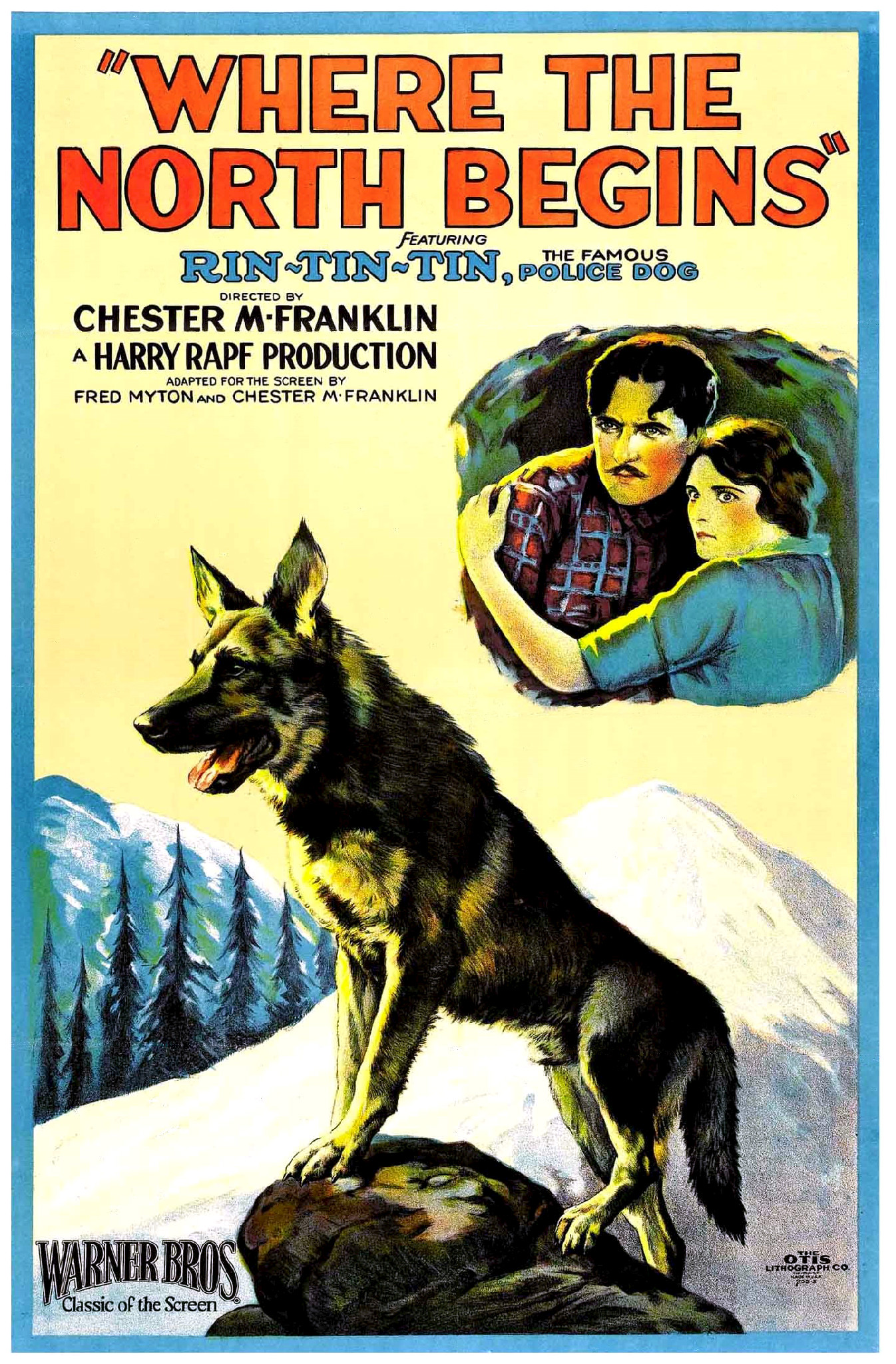
Poster for Rin Tin Tin's star debut, Where the North Begins (1923)

Duncan walked his dog up and down Poverty Row, talking to anyone in a position to put Rin Tin Tin in film, however modest the role. The dog's first break came when he was asked to replace a camera-shy wolf in The Man from Hell's River (1922) featuring Wallace Beery. The wolf was not performing properly for the director, but under the guidance of Duncan's voice commands, Rin Tin Tin was very easy to work with. When the film was completed, the dog was billed as "Rin Tan". Rin Tin Tin would be cast as a wolf or wolf-hybrid many times in his career because working with a trained dog was much more convenient for filmmakers. In another 1922 film titled My Dad, Rin Tin Tin picked up a small part as a household dog. The credits read: "Rin Tin Tin – Played by himself".

Rin Tin Tin's first starring role was in Where the North Begins (1923), in which he played alongside silent screen actress Claire Adams. This film was a huge success and has often been credited with saving Warner Bros. Pictures, Inc. from bankruptcy. It was followed by 24 more screen appearances by Rin Tin Tin. Each of these films was very popular, making such a profit for Warner Bros. that Rin Tin Tin was called "the mortgage lifter" by studio insiders. A young screenwriter named Darryl F. Zanuck was involved in creating stories for Rin Tin Tin; the success of the films raised him to the position of film producer. In New York City, Mayor Jimmy Walker gave Rin Tin Tin a key to the city.

Rin Tin Tin was much sought after and was signed for endorsement deals. Dogfood makers Ken-L Ration, Ken-L-Biskit, and Pup-E-Crumbles all featured him in their advertisements. Warner Bros. fielded fan letters by the thousands, sending back a glossy portrait signed with a paw print and a message written by Duncan: "Most faithfully, Rin Tin Tin". In the 1920s, Rin Tin Tin's success for Warner Bros. inspired several imitations from other studios looking to cash in on his popularity, notably RKO's Ace the Wonder Dog, also a German Shepherd. Around the world, Rin Tin Tin was extremely popular because as a dog he was equally well understood by all viewers. At the time, silent films were easily adapted for various countries by simply changing the language of the intertitles. Rin Tin Tin's films were widely distributed. Film historian Jan-Christopher Horak wrote that by 1927, Rin Tin Tin was the most popular actor with the very sophisticated film audience in Berlin. "He is a human dog," one fan wrote, "human in the real big sense of the word."

A Hollywood legend states that at the first Academy Awards in 1929, Rin Tin Tin was voted Best Actor, but that the Academy of Motion Picture Arts and Sciences, wishing to appear more serious and thus determined to have a human actor win the award, removed Rin Tin Tin as a choice and reran the vote, leading to German actor Emil Jannings winning the award. Author Susan Orlean stated this story as fact in her 2011 book Rin Tin Tin: The Life and the Legend. However, former Academy head Bruce Davis has described the story as an urban legend, attributing its origins to a joke ballot circulated the previous year by Zanuck, who wanted to mock the concept of the Academy Awards. Davis consulted the original 1928 ballots, which are kept in storage at the Academy's Margaret Herrick Library, and confirmed that no one voted for Rin Tin Tin (although Jack L. Warner did, as a joke, include the dog on his nomination ballot); also, since the ballots that year were signed rather than secret, Davis ascertained that Zanuck did not even vote for that year's awards.

Although primarily a star of silent films, Rin Tin Tin did appear in four sound features, including the 12-part Mascot Studios chapter-play The Lightning Warrior (1931), costarring with Frankie Darro. In these films, vocal commands would have been picked up by the microphones, so Duncan likely guided Rin Tin Tin by hand signals. Rin Tin Tin and the rest of the crew filmed much of the outdoor action footage for The Lightning Warrior on the Iverson Movie Ranch in Chatsworth, Los Angeles, known for its huge sandstone boulders and widely recognized as the most heavily filmed outdoor shooting location in the history of the movies.

Rin Tin Tin and Nanette II produced at least 48 puppies; Duncan kept two of them, selling the rest or giving them as gifts. Greta Garbo, W.K. Kellogg, and Jean Harlow each owned one of Rin Tin Tin's descendants.

== Death and accolades ==
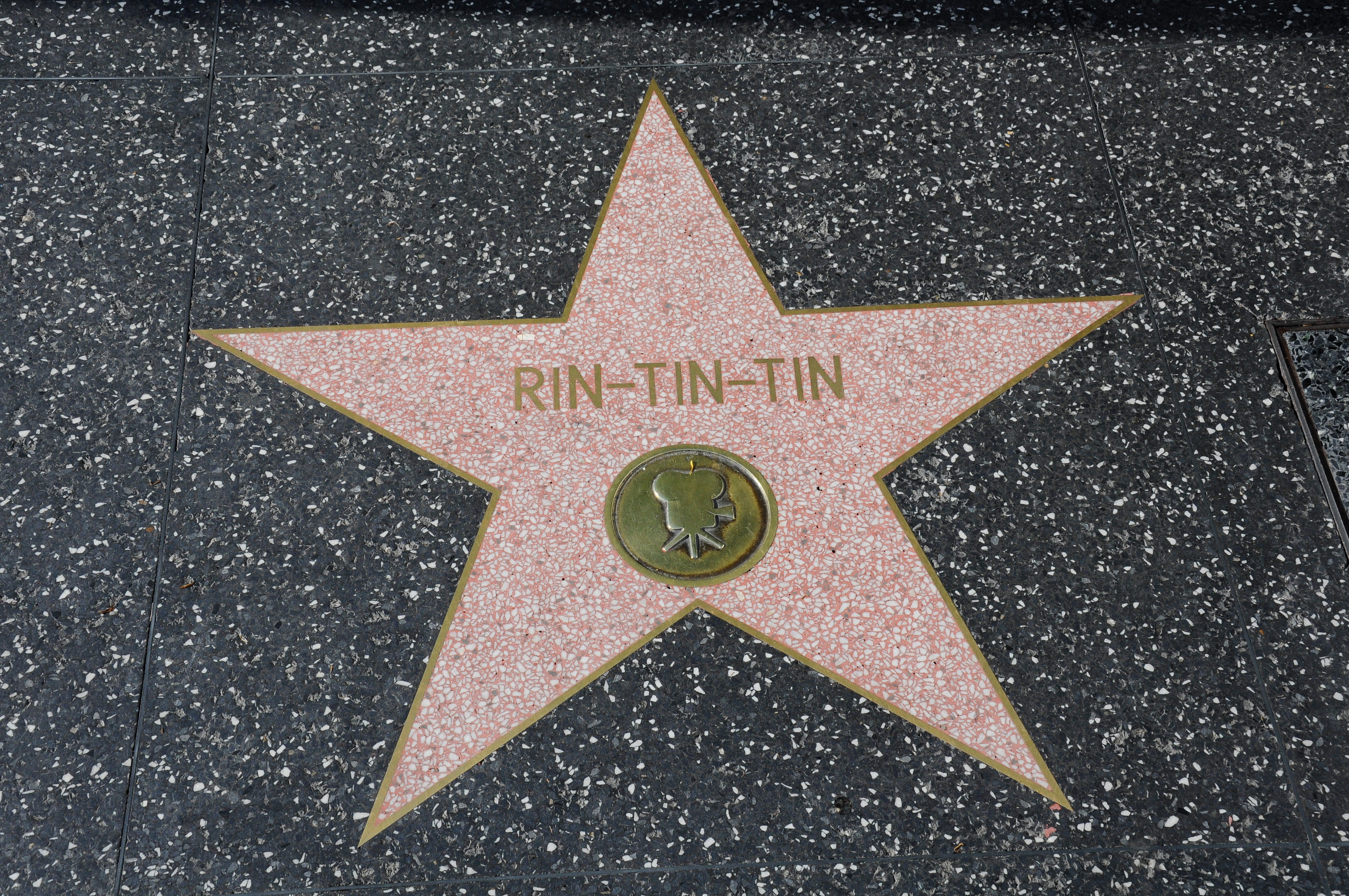
Rin Tin Tin's star on the Hollywood Walk of Fame

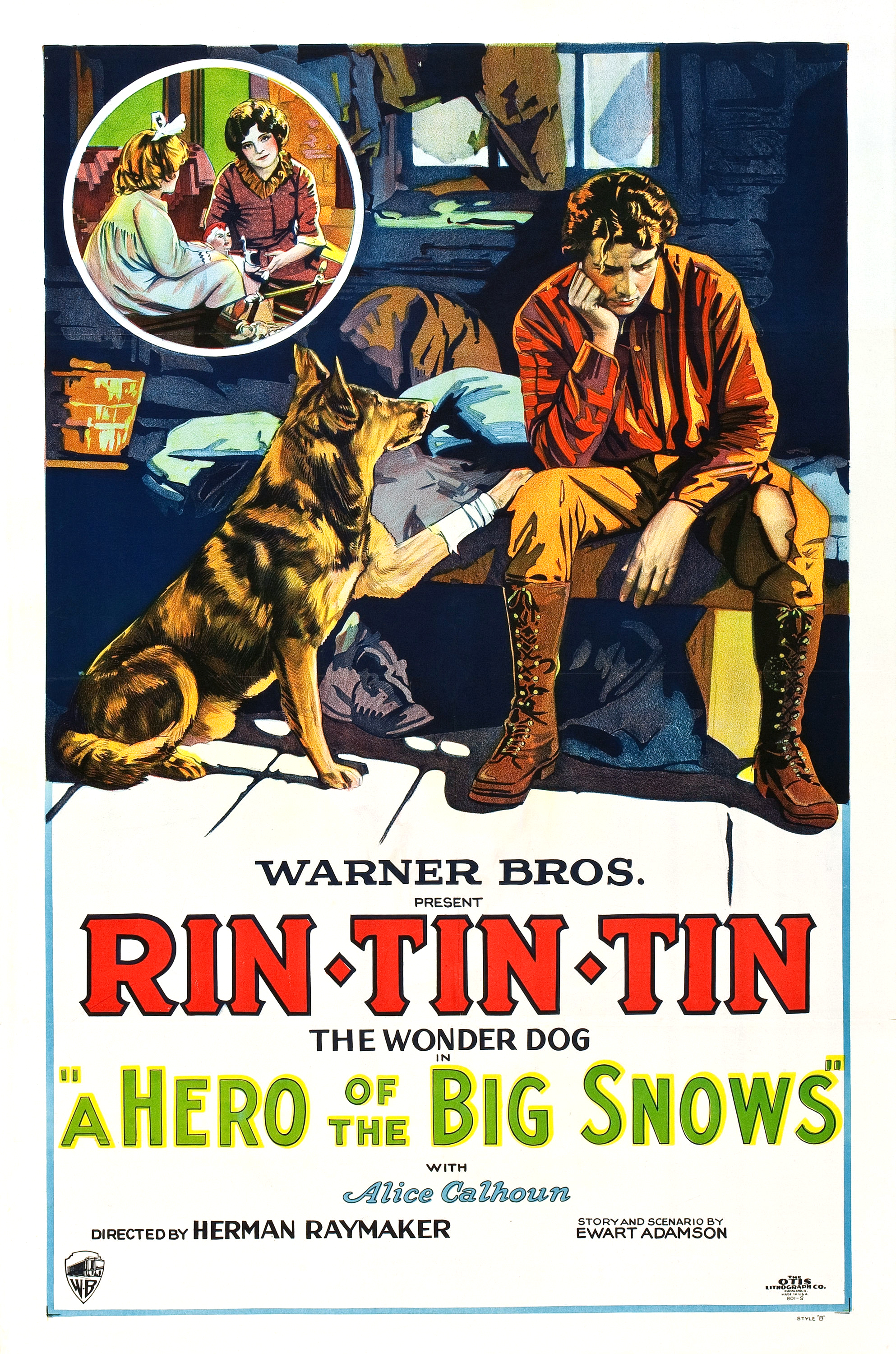
Poster for A Hero of the Big Snows (1926)

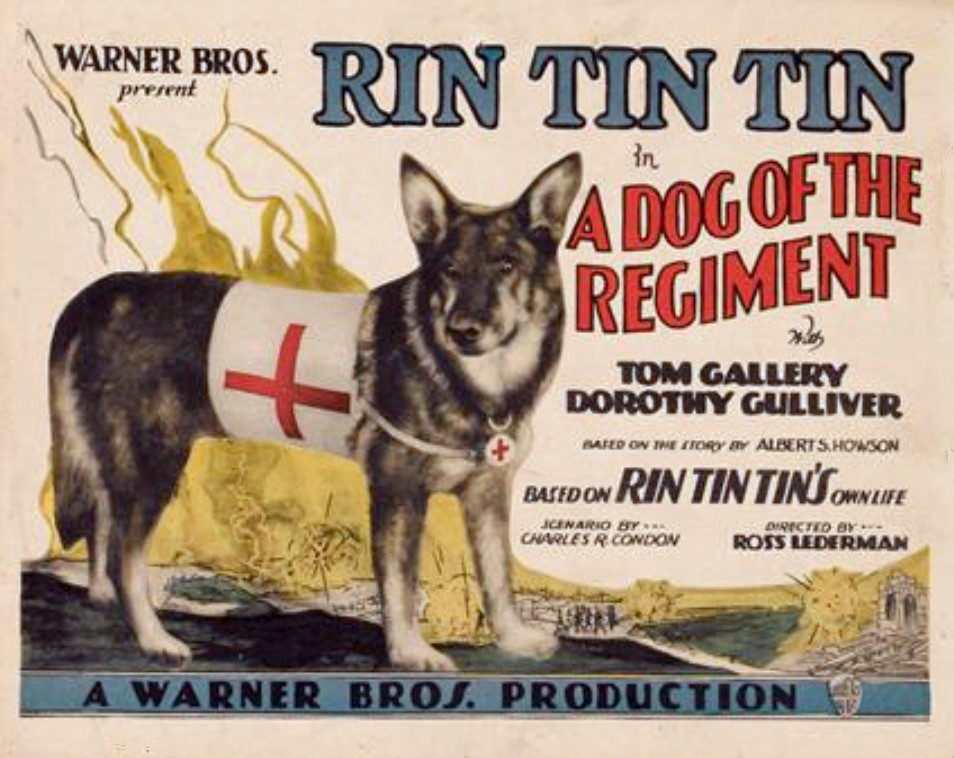
Lobby card for A Dog of the Regiment (1927)

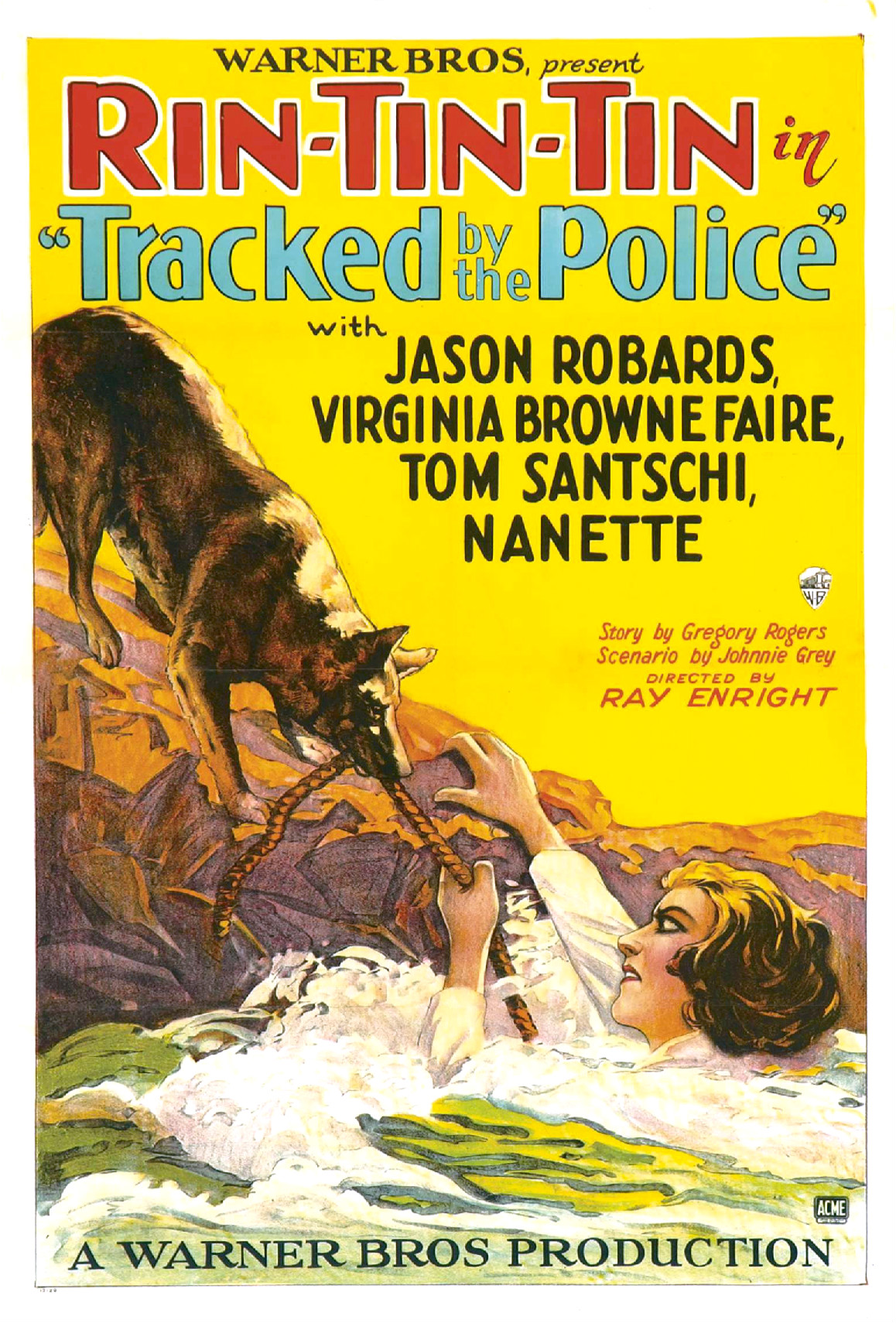
Poster for Tracked by the Police (1927)

On August 10, 1932, Rin Tin Tin died at Duncan's home on Club View Drive in Los Angeles. Duncan wrote about the death in his unpublished memoir. He heard Rin Tin Tin bark in a peculiar fashion, so he went to see what was wrong. He found the dog lying on the ground, moments away from death. Newspapers across the nation carried obituaries. Magazine articles were written about his life, and a special Movietone News feature was shown to movie audiences. In the press, aspects of the death were fabricated in various ways, such as Rin Tin Tin dying on the set of the film Pride of the Legion (where Rin Tin Tin Jr. was working), dying at night, or dying at home on the front lawn in the arms of actress Jean Harlow, who lived on the same street. In a private ceremony, Duncan buried Rin Tin Tin in a bronze casket in his own backyard with a plain wooden cross to mark the location. Duncan was suffering the financial effects of the Great Depression and could not afford a finer burial, nor even his own expensive house, which he lost due to foreclosure. A grave at the Cemetery of Dogs and Other Domestic Animals, the pet cemetery in the Parisian suburb of Asnières-sur-Seine has been commonly assumed to be Rin Tin Tin's, as one bearing that name mentions the dog was a film actor. The belief is that Duncan surreptitiously arranged for the dog to be reburied there. In his book on pet cemeteries, though, American historian Paul Koudounaris provided documentation to show that the grave in fact was not for the Hollywood Rin Tin Tin, but rather a German Shepherd named after him that had minor roles in a handful of films in France during the 1940s and was owned by French comic Teddy Michaud. The location of the grave of the Hollywood Rin Tin Tin, according to Koudounaris's research, is now unknown, although Duncan's daughter told him she had no knowledge of her father moving it, and the casket is suspected to still be where it was buried, the spot now unmarked.

In the United States, his death set off a national response. Regular programming was interrupted by a news bulletin. An hour-long program about Rin Tin Tin played the next day. In a ceremony on February 8, 1960, Rin Tin Tin was honored with a star on the Hollywood Walk of Fame at 1627 Vine Street.

== Filmography 1922–1931 ==
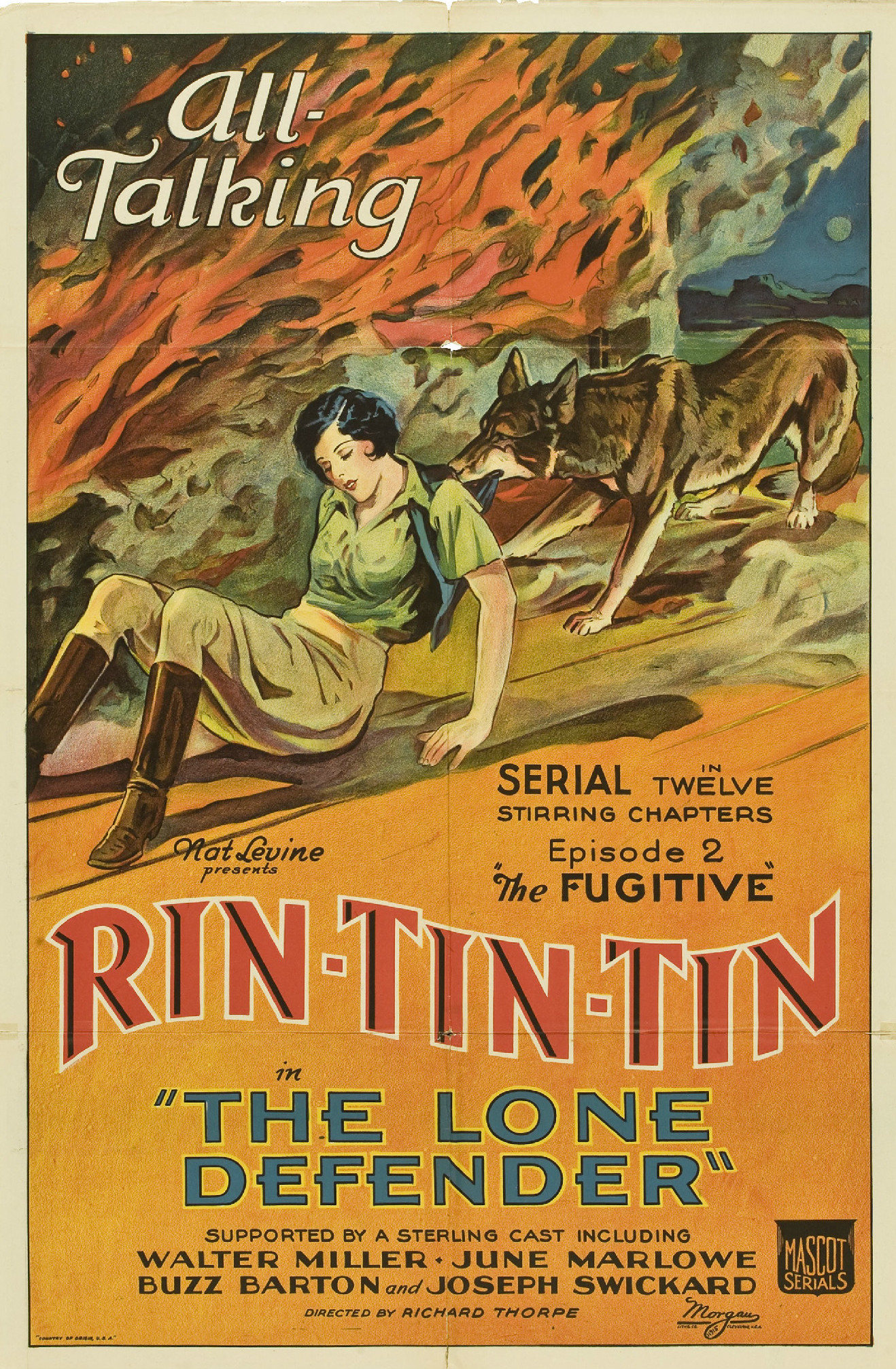
Poster for Rin Tin Tin's first Mascot serial, The Lone Defender

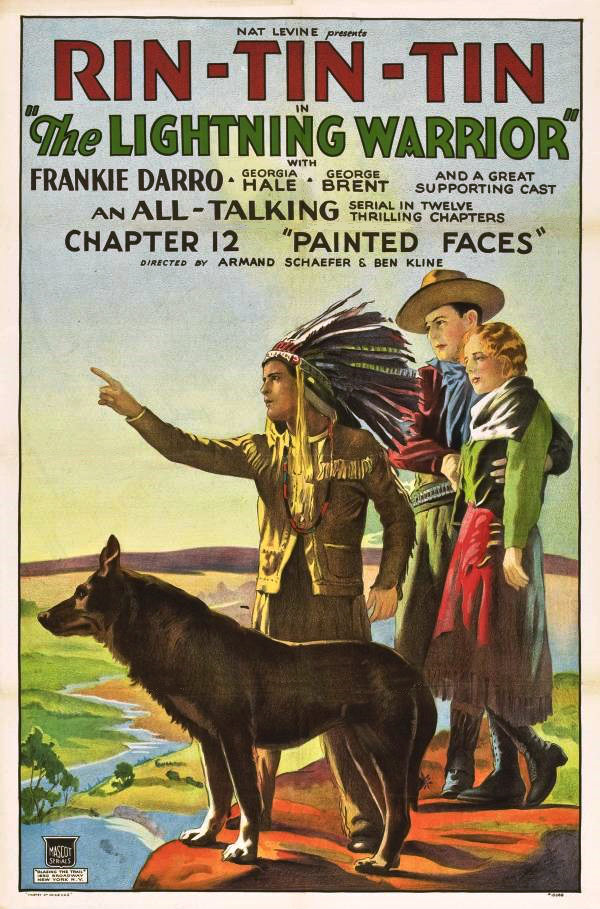
Poster for The Lightning Warrior (1931), Rin Tin Tin's last film

Film appearances by the original Rin Tin Tin
Year	Title	Role	Notes
1922	The Man from Hell's River	Himself	
1922	My Dad	Himself	
1923	Where the North Begins	The Wolf Dog	
1923	Shadows of the North	King	Lost film
1924	Find Your Man	Buddy	
1924	Hello, 'Frisco	Himself	Lost film
1924	The Lighthouse by the Sea	Himself	
1925	Tracked in the Snow Country	Himself	
1925	Below the Line	The Slasher	
1925	The Clash of the Wolves	Lobo	
1926	The Night Cry	Himself	
1926	A Hero of the Big Snows	Himself	
1926	While London Sleeps	Rinty	Lost film
1927	Hills of Kentucky	The Grey Ghost	
1927	Tracked by the Police	Rinty	
1927	Jaws of Steel	Rinty	
1927	A Dog of the Regiment	Rinty	Lost film
1928	A Race for Life	Rinty	
1928	Rinty of the Desert	Rinty	Lost film
1928	Land of the Silver Fox	Rinty	Incomplete film
1929	The Million Dollar Collar	Rinty	Lost film
1929	Frozen River	Lobo	Lost film
1929	The Show of Shows	Himself	
1929	Tiger Rose	Scotty	Incomplete film
1930	The Lone Defender	Rinty	12-chapter serial
1930	On the Border	Rinty	
1930	The Man Hunter	Rinty	Lost film
1930	Rough Waters	Rinty	Lost film
1931	The Lightning Warrior	Rinty	12-chapter serial

== Successors ==
=== Rin Tin Tin Jr. ===
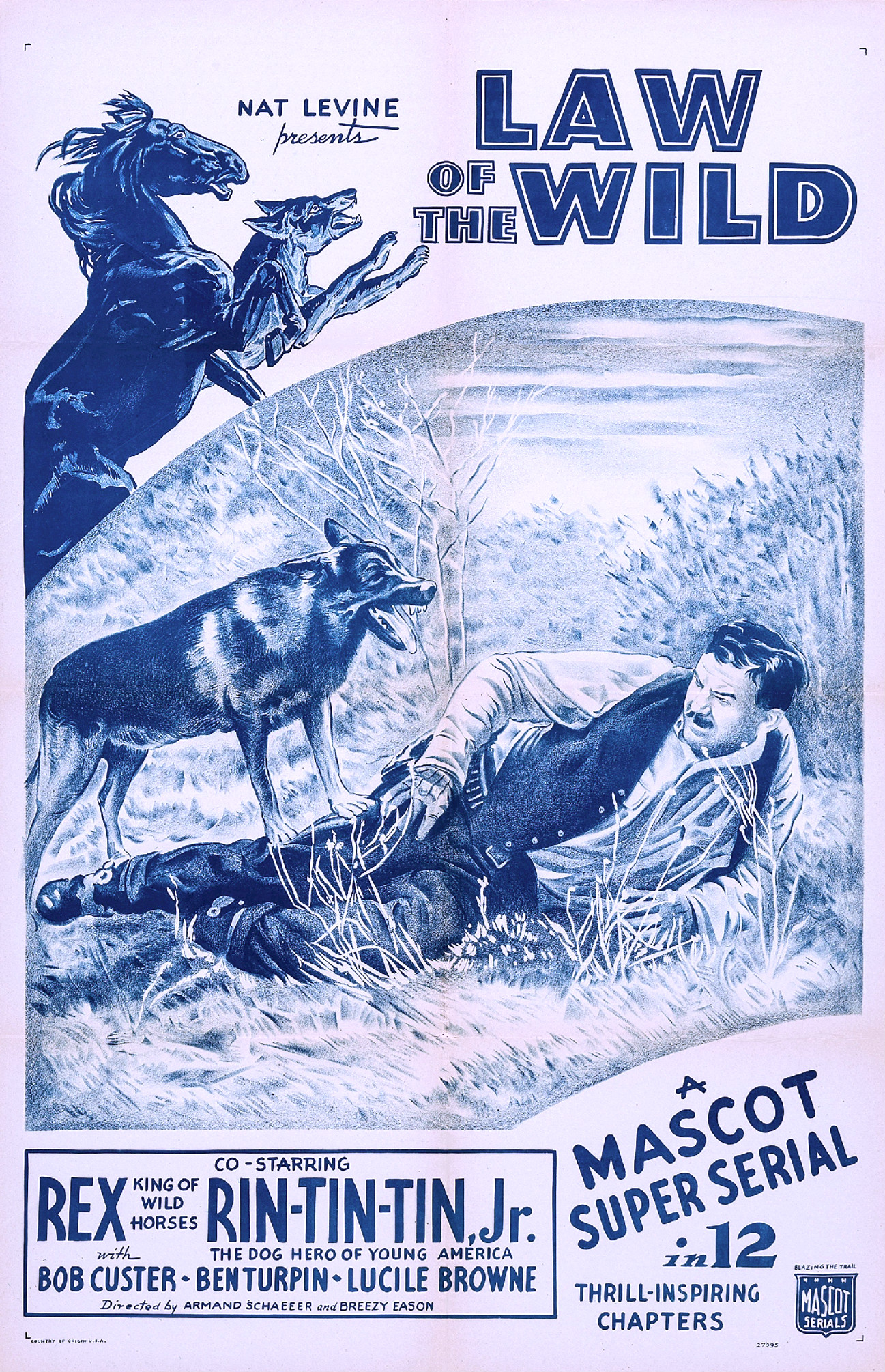
Poster for The Law of the Wild (1934)

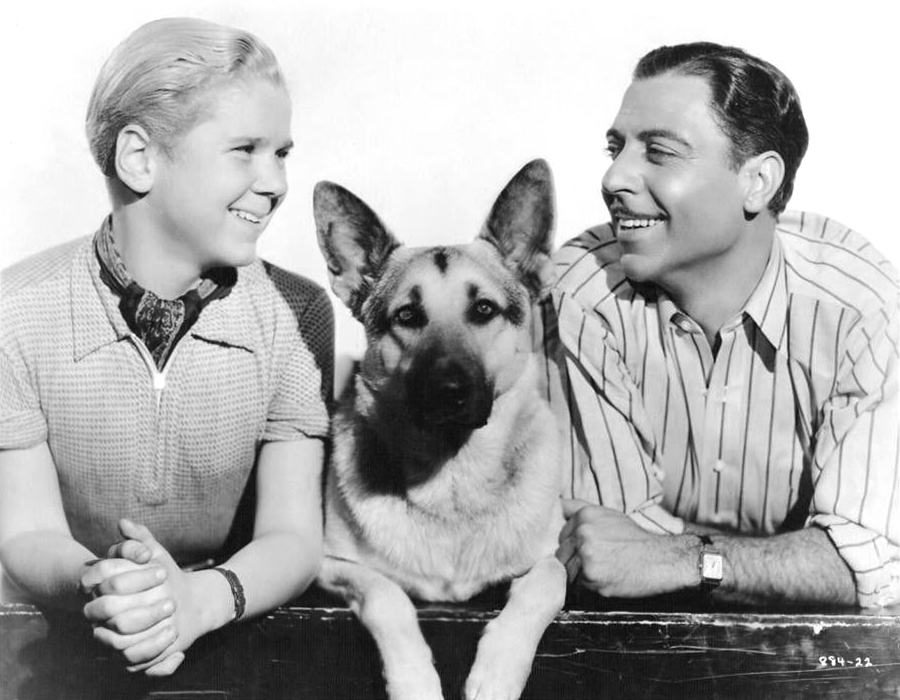
Jackie Cooper, Rin Tin Tin Jr., and Joseph Calleia in Tough Guy (1936)

Rin Tin Tin Jr. was sired by Rin Tin Tin, and his mother was Champion Asta of Linwood, also owned by Lee Duncan. Junior appeared in several films in the 1930s. He starred with Rex the Wild Horse in the Mascot Pictures serials The Law of the Wild (1934) and The Adventures of Rex and Rinty (1935). He voiced the part of Rinty in the radio shows produced during that era as well.

Rin Tin Tin Jr. died in December 1941 of pneumonia.

==== Filmography 1932–1939 ====
Film appearances by Rin Tin Tin Jr.
Year	Title	Role	Notes
1932	The Pride of the Legion		
1933	The Wolf Dog		Serial
1934	The Law of the Wild		12-chapter serial
1935	The Test		
1935	The Adventures of Rex and Rinty		12-chapter serial
1935	Skull and Crown		
1936	Tough Guy	Duke	
1936	Vengeance of Rannah	Rannah	
1936	Caryl of the Mountains	Rinty	
1937	The Silver Trail		
1939	Hollywood Cavalcade	Rin Tin Tin	
1939	Death Goes North	King	
1939	Fangs of the Wild	Rinty	
1939	Law of the Wolf		(Note: There is confusion about whether this film stars Rin Tin Tin Jr., or Rin Tin Tin III, or possibly another of the dogs used by Duncan.)

=== Rin Tin Tin III ===
Rin Tin Tin III starred alongside a young Robert Blake in 1947's The Return of Rin Tin Tin but is primarily credited with assisting Duncan in the training of more than 5,000 dogs for the World War II war effort at Camp Hahn, California.

==== Filmography 1947 ====
Film appearances by Rin Tin Tin III
Year	Title	Role	Notes
1947	The Return of Rin Tin Tin	Rin Tin Tin	

== Radio ==
Between 1930 and 1955, Rin Tin Tin was cast in three different radio series, beginning April 5, 1930, with The Wonder Dog, in which the original Rin Tin Tin performed some of the sound effects until his death in 1932. (Most of the dog noises were performed live on radio by a young Bob Barker.) This 15-minute program was broadcast Saturdays on the Blue Network at 8:15 pm until March 1931, when it moved to Thursdays. Storylines were often highly unlikely, with Rin Tin Tin saving a group of space-exploring scientists from giant Martians in one episode.

In September 1930, the title changed from The Wonder Dog to Rin Tin Tin. Don Ameche and Junior McLain starred in the series, which ended June 8, 1933. With Ken-L Ration as a sponsor, the series continued on CBS from October 5, 1933, until May 20, 1934, airing Sundays at 7:45 pm.

The final radio series was broadcast on Mutual from January 2, 1955, to December 25, 1955, a 30-minute program heard Sunday evenings. Sponsored by Shredded Wheat and Milk-Bone for The National Biscuit Company, the series featured Rin Tin Tin's adventures with the 101st Cavalry in the same manner as the concurrent TV show, The Adventures of Rin Tin Tin. The radio show also starred Lee Aaker (1943–2021) as Rusty, James Brown (1920–1992) as Lieutenant Ripley "Rip" Masters, and Joe Sawyer (1906–1982) as Sergeant Biff O'Hara.

== Television ==
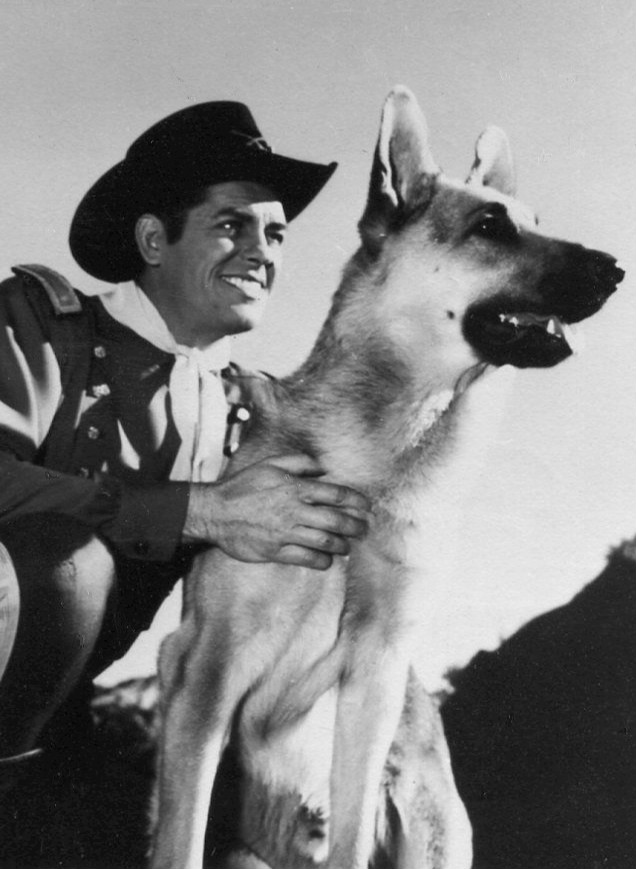
Jim Brown as Lt. Masters in the TV series The Adventures of Rin Tin Tin

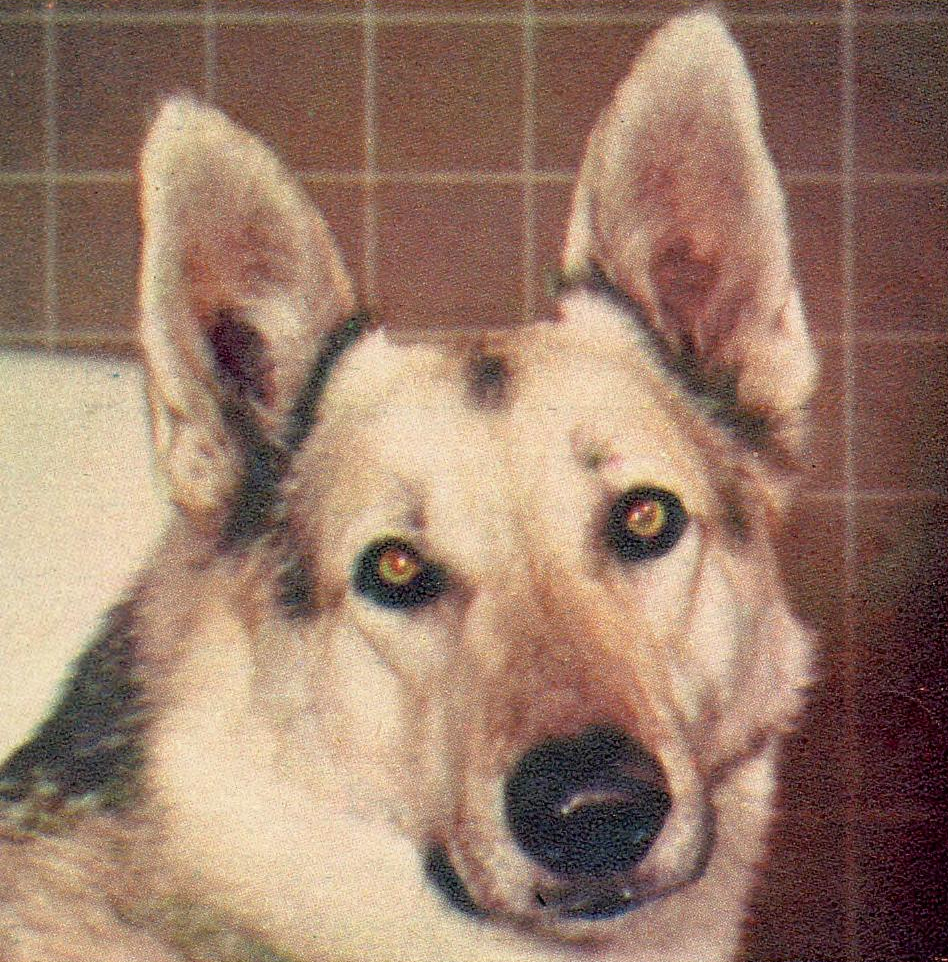
Rin Tin Tin IV c. 1954

The Adventures of Rin Tin Tin, an ABC television series, ran from October 1954 to May 1959. Duncan's Rin Tin Tin IV was nominally the lead dog, but nearly all of the screen work was performed by a dog named Flame Jr., nicknamed J.R., owned by trainer Frank Barnes. Other dogs that sometimes played TV's Rin Tin Tin included Barnes's dog Blaze and Duncan's dog Hey You from the Rin Tin Tin bloodline. Hey You had suffered an eye injury during his youth; he was used as a stunt dog and for fight scenes. TV's Rin Tin Tin was far lighter in color than the original sable-colored dog of silent film.

== Legacy ==
Lee Duncan died on September 20, 1960, without ever having trademarked the name "Rin Tin Tin". The tradition continued in Texas with Jannettia Brodsgaard Propps, who had purchased several direct descendant dogs from Duncan. Her granddaughter, Daphne Hereford, continued the lineage and the legacy of Rin Tin Tin following her grandmother's death on December 17, 1988. Hereford passed the tradition to her daughter, Dorothy Yanchak, in July 2011. The current Rin Tin Tin is twelfth in line from the original silent film star and makes personal appearances across the country to promote responsible pet ownership. Rin Tin Tin was the recipient of the 2011 American Humane Association Legacy award, accepted by a twelfth-generation Rin Tin Tin legacy dog in October 2011 at the first annual Hero Dog Awards in Beverly Hills. Mickey Rooney narrated a memorial tribute film about Rin Tin Tin. The next year, Rin Tin Tin was honored by the Academy of Arts and Sciences in a special program, Hollywood Dogs: From Rin Tin Tin to Uggie, on June 6, 2012, at the Samuel Goldwyn Theatre. The career of contemporary film dog Uggie (2002–2015) was compared to Rin Tin Tin's silent-era career.

== In literature and the arts ==
In 1976, a film loosely based on Rin Tin Tin's debut was produced: Won Ton Ton, the Dog Who Saved Hollywood. Producer David V. Picker offered a fee to Herbert B. Leonard, but Leonard objected to the premise of a film ridiculing the famous dog. Leonard sued the filmmakers for infringement on the Rin Tin Tin legacy and lost.

Originally co-produced by Leonard, the 1988–93 Canadian TV series Katts and Dog featured the adventures of a police officer and his canine partner. The series was titled Rin Tin Tin: K9 Cop for its American showings; in France it was presented as Rintintin Junior. Leonard was funded by the Christian Broadcasting Network, whose founder, televangelist Pat Robertson, had been enthusiastic for the idea. Leonard was criticized by his fellow producers for staying with his new wife in Los Angeles rather than helping with the show on location in Canada. Partway through the first season, Robertson said that some of his viewers were deeply concerned that the plot involved a widowed mother who was living unmarried in the same house with the brother of her late husband. Robertson recommended the mother character be killed off to stop the complaints, but Leonard protested such a change. After Leonard quit the show, the problematic character was killed off. Though separated from the show, Leonard continued to receive a fee for the screen rights to Rin Tin Tin.

In 2007, a children's film was produced—Finding Rin Tin Tin—based on the story of Lee Duncan finding Rin Tin Tin on a battlefield in France and making a star of him in Hollywood. The film was the subject of a lawsuit brought in October 2008 by Daphne Hereford, who asked a federal court in Houston, Texas, to protect her rights to the Rin Tin Tin trademark. The judge ruled in favor of the filmmakers, declaring the use of the name in the film to be fair use.

A fictionalized account of Lee Duncan finding and raising Rin Tin Tin is a major part of the novel Sunnyside by Glen David Gold.

Rin Tin Tin has been featured as a character in many works of fiction, including a children's book in which Rin Tin Tin and the other animal characters are able to talk to one another but are unable to talk to humans.

Rin Tin Tin finds mention in Anne Frank's diary in her second entry on June 14, 1942. Frank wishes she had a dog like Rin Tin Tin. She also wrote about the 1924 Rin Tin Tin silent film The Lighthouse by the Sea, which she and her school friends watched together in her house for her birthday party. According to her, the movie was a big hit with her friends.

The Clash's 1981 song "The Magnificent Seven" referenced the dog - "Plato the Greek or Rin Tin Tin/ who's more famous to the Billion Millions?".

== See also ==
- Higgins
- Jean
- Rantanplan
- Strongheart
- List of individual dogs

== Bibliography ==
- English, James W. (1950). The Rin Tin Tin Story. Dodd, Mead & Co.
- Orlean, Susan (2011). Rin Tin Tin: The Life and the Legend. New York: Simon & Schuster. ISBN 978-1439190135.
- Rothel, David (1980). "Man's Best Friends". The Great Show Business Animals. A.S. Barnes. ISBN 0498025195.
- Wenzel, Glenn (October 2022). "Rin Tin Tin Answers the Call". Riverside During World War II. Riverside, CA: Riverside Historical Society. pp. 121–128. ISBN 979-8849200880.
