= The Library Book =

2018 book by Susan Orlean in Los Angeles Central Library

- First edition
- Author: Susan Orlean
- Language: English
- Subject: Los Angeles Central Library
- Genre: Nonfiction
- Set in: Los Angeles, California
- Publisher: Simon & Schuster
- Publication date: 2018
- Publication place: United States
- Media type: Book
- Pages: 336
- ISBN: 978-1-4767-4018-8

The Library Book is a 2018 non-fiction book by Susan Orlean about a 1986 fire at the Los Angeles Central Library. It received strongly favorable reviews and became a New York Times Best Seller.

== Development and publication ==
When Orlean's son had a school assignment to interview a city employee, he chose a librarian and together they visited the Studio City branch of the Los Angeles Public Library system which reignited her own childhood passion for libraries. The immersive project involved three years of research and two years of writing. Orlean hired a fact-checker to ensure the book was accurate, explaining, "I don't want a substantial error that changes the meaning of my book, but I also don't want silly errors".

The Library Book was published by Simon & Schuster on October 16, 2018. The first edition was 336 pages.

== Subject matter ==
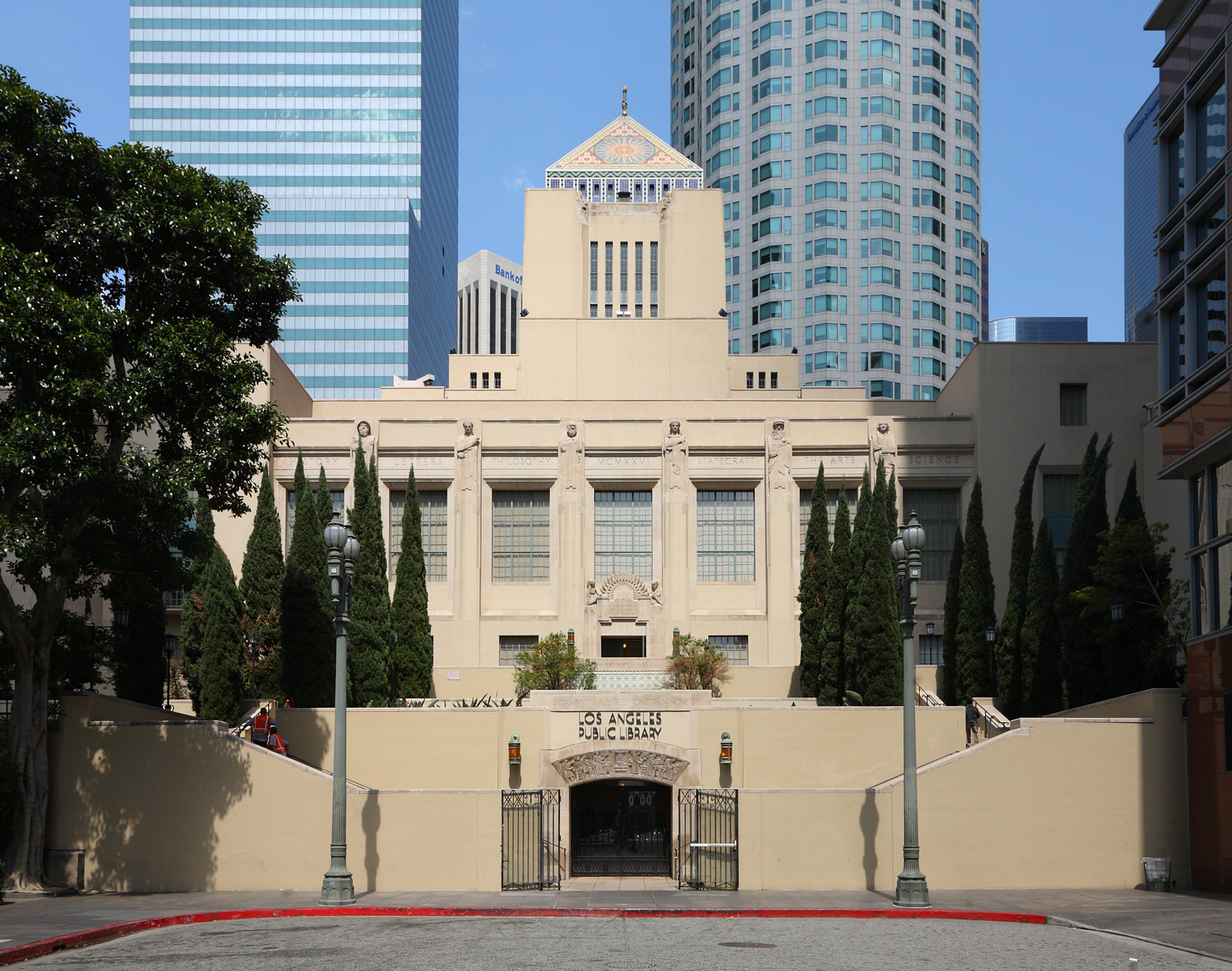
Los Angeles Central Library

The Library Book alternates between a true-crime work on the suspicion of arson in a 1986 fire at the Los Angeles Central Library; and a broader history of that library and Orlean's personal devotion to libraries in general, especially as the site of fond memories she shared with her mother.

Regarding the suspected arson, Orlean traces the story of suspect Harry Peak, who was arrested but ultimately not tried in a criminal trial for arson, due to the weakness of evidence against him. Peak and the City of Los Angeles settled dueling civil suits shortly before Peak’s death from complications of HIV/AIDS in 1993.

== Reception ==
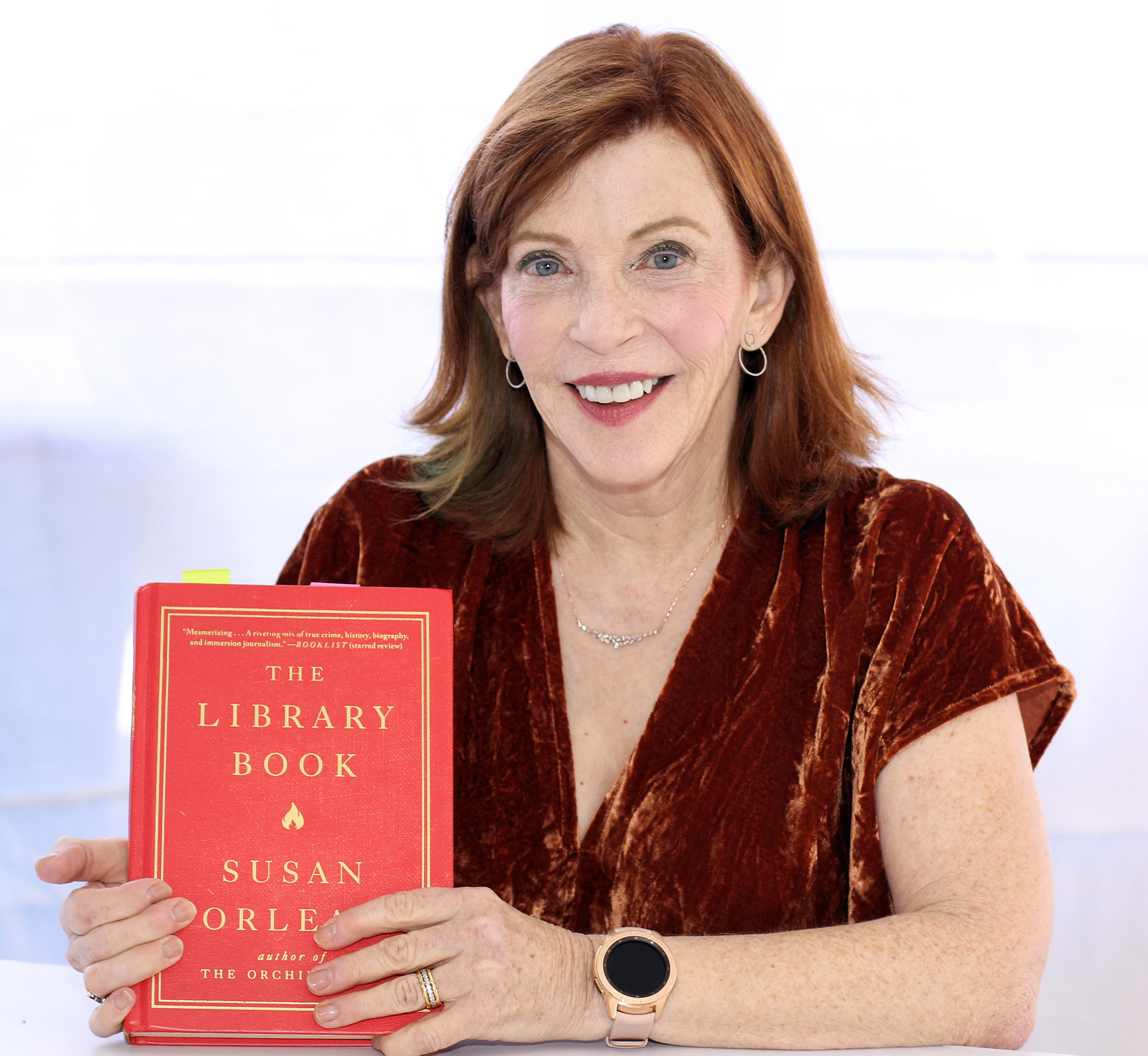
Orlean in 2018

The Library Book received strongly favorable reviews and was selected as a "PW Pick" by Publishers Weekly.

Reviewing the book for The New York Times, Michael Lewis wrote, "Susan Orlean has once again found rich material where no one else has bothered to look for it…Once again, she's demonstrated that the feelings of a writer, if that writer is sufficiently talented and her feelings sufficiently strong, can supply her own drama. You really never know how seriously interesting a subject might be until such a person takes a serious interest in it." In The Washington Post, Ron Charles called The Library Book "a wide-ranging, deeply personal and terrifically engaging investigation of humanity's bulwark against oblivion: the library."

The Library Book became a New York Times Best Seller.

== Television adaptation ==
As of 2019, Orlean is slated to collaborate with James Ponsoldt to write and executive-produce an adaption for television.

== See also ==
- Fahrenheit 451 – mentioned in the book
- Bibliophilia
- Adaptation – 2002 Oscar-winning adaptation of The Orchid Thief
