= Brendan O'Connell =

Brendan O'Connell may refer to:

- Brendan O'Connell (artist) (born 1968), American Wal-Art artist
- Brendan O'Connell (canoeist) (born 1951), Irish Olympic canoer
- Brendan O'Connell (footballer) (born 1966), English football player
