= Rin Tin Tin: The Life and the Legend =

2011 book by Susan Orlean

- Author: Susan Orlean
- Publisher: Simon & Schuster
- Publication date: 2011

Rin Tin Tin: The Life and the Legend is a book by Susan Orlean published in 2011 by Simon & Schuster. It is a non-fiction account of Rin Tin Tin. Blogcritics praised the depth of the book and wrote that "It was fascinating to read about the 16 million animals deployed in World War I as scouts, messengers, carriers of medical supplies, and sentries. The insertion of the author’s personal reflections detracted from the more compelling story, but is a minor flaw in an otherwise extraordinary book." Alaska Dispatch put it in its "20 new nonfiction reads for fall", calling it "a must-read book that is both an excellent piece of cultural history and a remarkable story of the animal-human bond."
