= The Bullfighter Checks Her Makeup =

Collection of essays published in 2001

The Bullfighter Checks Her Makeup: My Encounters with Extraordinary People
- Author: Susan Orlean
- Genre: Essay collection
- Publisher: Random House
- Publication date: 2001

The Bullfighter Checks Her Makeup: My Encounters with Extraordinary People is a collection of essays by Susan Orlean published in 2001 by Random House. It was her first book after her 1998 work The Orchid Thief.

== Reception ==
Kirkus Reviews wrote "some essays work better than others, but in general the collection is marred only by a few too many run-on sentences and the occasional quick ending, giving the impression that the author was writing to hit a certain word-count". The New York Times offered a more favorable assessment, noting that such collections of journalistic essays must "be timeless,...remarkable and the voice so consistently engaging that it triumphs over lack of plot and sprawl of subject," but that Orlean "clears the bar with ease." Emiliana Sandoval, reviewing the work for Knight Ridder, noted that the older stories in the collection could "seem stale", but that the "gems" of the collection -- "The American Man, Age Ten" and "Her Town"—made the work well worth reading. Time asserted that the profiles rarely miss, and were as much about place as person, noting the supporting role that Clackamas County, Oregon played in the Tonya Harding piece.
