= Tracked by the Police =

1927 film by Ray Enright

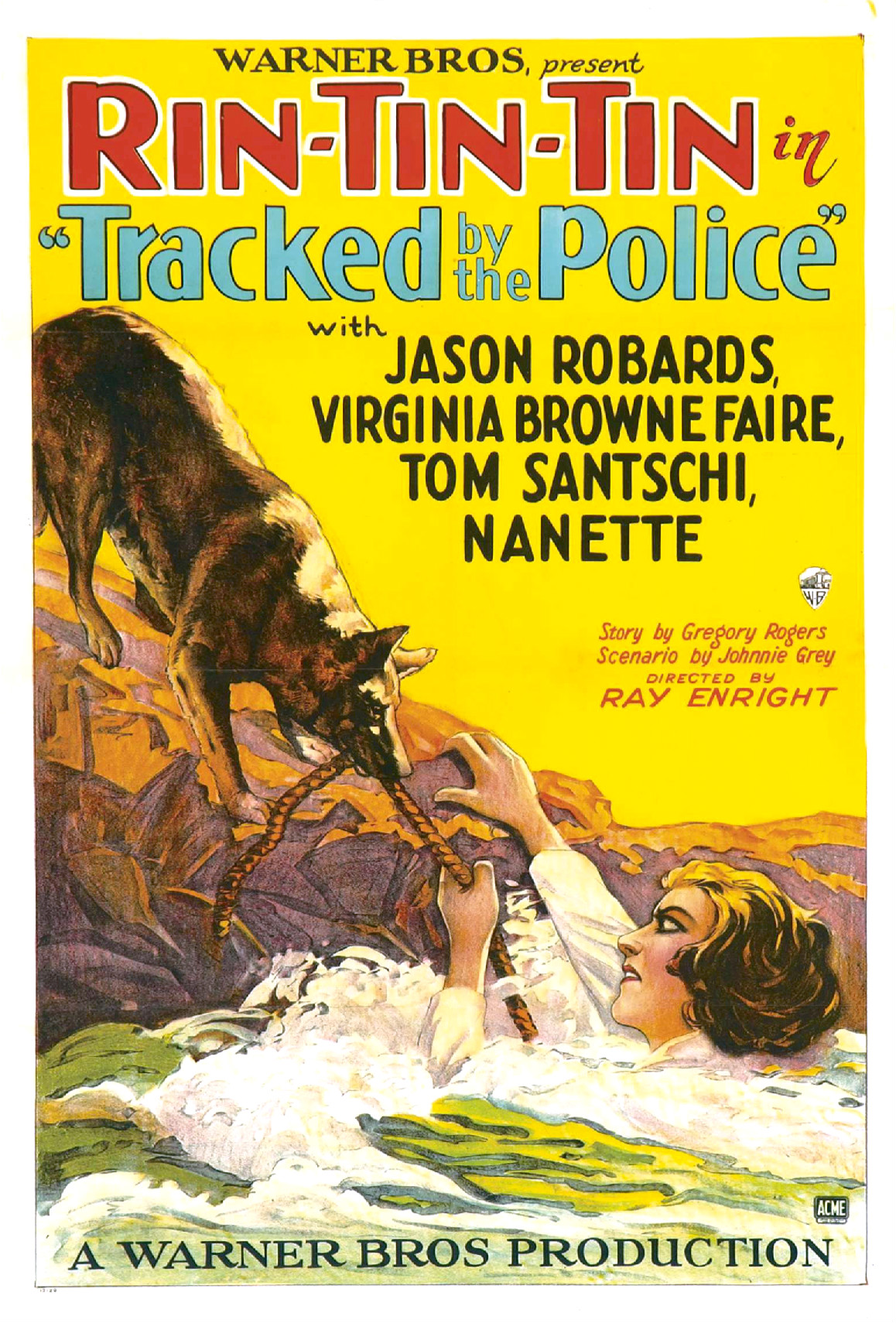
- Theatrical release poster
- Directed by: Ray Enright
- Written by: John Grey (scenario)
- Story by: "Gregory Rogers" (Darryl F. Zanuck)
- Starring: Rin Tin Tin
- Cinematography: Edwin B. DuPar (screen credit; trade papers of 1927 credit David Abel)
- Edited by: Owen Marks
- Production company: Warner Bros.
- Distributed by: Warner Bros.
- Release date: May 7, 1927
- Running time: 6 reels (5,823 feet)
- Country: United States
- Language: Silent (English intertitles)

Tracked by the Police is a 1927 silent film produced and distributed by Warner Bros. based on a story written by Darryl Zanuck. It stars canine actor Rin Tin Tin. Ray Enright directed the film with 'Rinty's' costars being Jason Robards, Sr. and Virginia Brown Faire. The film may have had a Vitaphone sound effects/music track that is now lost. The film is preserved at the Library of Congress.

== Cast ==
- Rin Tin Tin as Satan
- Jason Robards, Sr. as Dan Owen
- Virginia Brown Faire as Marcella Bradley
- Tom Santschi as "Sandy" Sturgeon
- Nanette the Dog as Princess Beth, Satan's girlfriend
- Dave Morris as "Wyoming" Willie
- Theodore Lorch as "Bull" Storm
- Wilfrid North as Tom Bradley
- Ben Walker as Crook

== Plot outline ==
Dan Owen is in charge of construction at a dam site, and his dog is on guard duty. Dan's girl Marcella visits, accompanied by her own dog Princess Beth, so there are two romances budding. Dan has to complete the dam by a deadline, while his foreman Sandy tries to delay it and then openly resists it, tying Dan up. Dan's dog races to save the dam from destruction.

The film's title has nothing to do with the storyline: it was coined in February 1927 for another Warner picture starring Frances Lee, and then transferred to the Rin Tin Tin feature. A trade reviewer advised exhibitors, "Do not place emphasis on the title for no police appear in the picture, and the title seems to have been erroneously chosen." Warner Bros. dragged the title in just before the end title: "As a reward for valor Satan was made a first grade detective -- and when the criminals were caught the record read TRACKED BY THE POLICE."

== Critical response ==
Critics of the day marveled at how well Rin Tin Tin carried off the demands of the script: "Rin Tin Tin performs several excellent and thrilling stunts. It is an exciting melodrama, and as a vehicle for showing what this clever dog can be made to do is exceptionally good." At one point Rin Tin Tin hides in a grandfather's clock, and the suspense builds as the villain shoots at it. In the climactic scene, the dog tries to find the levers controlling the dam. The villain has disabled them, so the dog tries to shut down the electrical power.

== Revival ==
Warner Bros. short-subject producer Robert Youngson prepared a 10-minute digest of Tracked by the Police for theaters in 1954, with added music, sound effects, and narration. The short version is titled A Bit of the Best.

== Preservation status ==
Prints of Tracked by the Police are held by George Eastman House and the Library of Congress.

== See also ==
- List of early Warner Bros. sound and talking features
