= Flirey =

- Commune
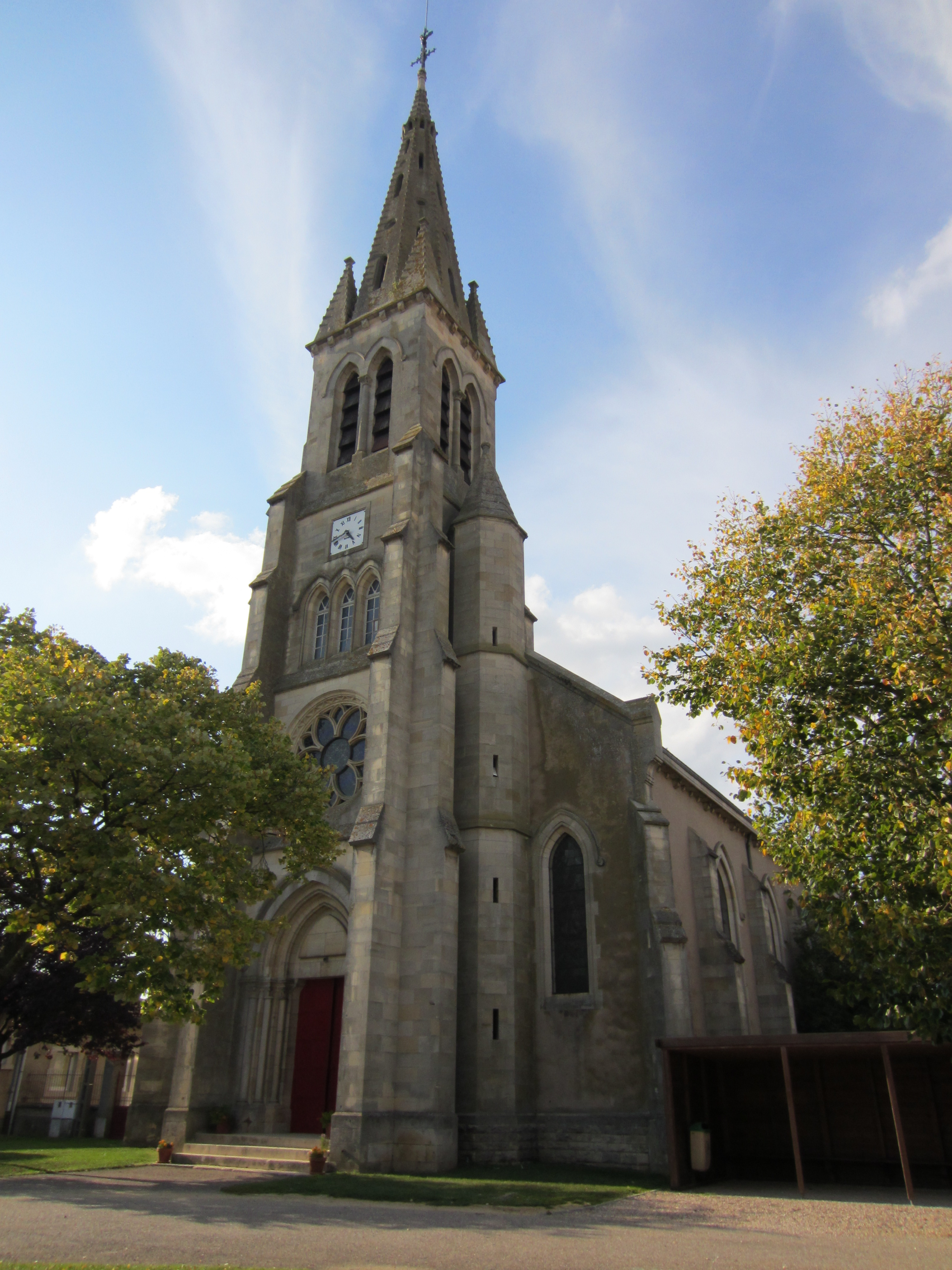
- The church in Flirey

- Coat of arms
- Location of Flirey
- Location within France Location within Grand Est
- Coordinates: 48°52′35″N 5°50′54″E
- Country: France
- Region: Grand Est
- Department: Meurthe-et-Moselle
- Arrondissement: Toul
- Canton: Le Nord-Toulois
- Intercommunality: Mad et Moselle

Government
  - Mayor (2020–2026): Jean-Pierre David
- Area^{1}: 15.77 km^{2} (6.09 sq mi)
- Elevation: 21 m (69 ft)
- Highest elevation: 332 m (1,089 ft)
- Lowest elevation: 256 m (840 ft)
- Population (2023): 159
  - Density: 10.1/km^{2} (26.1/sq mi)
- Time zone: UTC+01:00 (CET)
  - Summer (DST): UTC+02:00 (CEST)
- INSEE/Postal code: 54200 /54470
- ^{1} French Land Register data, which excludes lakes, ponds, glaciers > 1 km^{2} (0.386 sq mi or 247 acres) and river estuaries.

Flirey (French pronunciation: [fliʁɛ]) is a commune in the Meurthe-et-Moselle department in northeastern France.

== Birthplace of Rin Tin Tin ==
Following advances made by American forces during the Battle of Saint-Mihiel, Corporal Lee Duncan, an aerial gunner of the U.S. Army Air Service, was sent forward on September 15, 1918, to Flirey to see if it would make a suitable flying field for his unit, the 135th Aero Squadron. The area had been subject to bombs and artillery, and Duncan found a severely damaged kennel which had once supplied the Imperial German Army with German Shepherd dogs. The only dogs left alive in the kennel were a starving mother with a litter of five nursing puppies, their eyes still shut because they were less than a week old. Duncan rescued the dogs and brought them back to his unit.

When the puppies were weaned, he gave the mother to an officer and three of the litter to other soldiers, but he kept a male and a female. He felt that these two dogs were symbols of his good luck. He called them Rin Tin Tin and Nanette after a pair of good luck charms called Rintintin and Nénette that French children often gave to the American soldiers.

== See also ==
- Communes of the Meurthe-et-Moselle department
- Parc naturel régional de Lorraine
