= The Lakeville Journal =

American weekly newspaper in Lakeville, Connecticut

- Type: Weekly newspaper
- Owner(s): LJMN Media, Inc
- Founder: Colvin Card
- Publisher: James H. Clark
- Editor-in-chief: Christian Murray
- Managing editor: Aly Morrissey
- Founded: 1897
- Language: English
- City: Lakeville, Connecticut
- Circulation: 4,800
- Website: lakevillejournal.com

The Lakeville Journal is an American weekly newspaper in Lakeville, Connecticut. It is published by The Lakeville Journal Company, which also publishes the Millerton News and published the Winsted Journal as a separate publication until it merged with the Lakeville Journal in 2017.

== History ==
The Journal was established in 1897 by Colvin Card as an independent eight-column four page weekly, published on Saturdays. Card's other newspaper, the Millerton, New York Telegram, had grown steadily in circulation. But the Journal, situated in a small farming community with a dying iron industry, had limited circulation, with Rowell's Directory consistently rating it as a paper with less than a thousand in paid circulation in the early 20th century. Early on, the paper used a boilerplate system for national coverage, with the first and last pages being produced by a syndicate and run along with ads for patent medicines, and the internal pages dedicated to original local reporting.

In 1905, editor Benjamin D. Jones bought out Card's interest and became sole editor and publisher.

Jones introduced a number of improvements to the Journal, including the introduction of a modern Linotype press. The paper struggled financially, however, and by the time of Jones's death in 1937. the Journal's subscription was only about 300. In 1940, it was purchased by New Yorkers Elizabeth Ann and Stewart Hoskins, who bought the Journal, and remade it as a 'cozy hometown paper' focused on local news. By 1948, the paper that only had 300 subscribers upon the Hoskins's purchase had received local and national recognition, including the Connecticut Editorial Association's 1948 first place prize for General Excellence and a trophy for the Best Special Edition in any weekly from the National Editors Association. Stewart Hoskins also served as the president of the Connecticut Editorial Association.

== Estabrook Years ==
In 1969, Elizabeth and Stewart Hoskins sold the paper to Robert Francis only to buy it back the following year. Finally, in 1971, the Journal was bought by Robert Estabrook, a former foreign correspondent and editor for the Washington Post, and his wife. Under Estabrook's leadership, the paper adopted more hard-hitting approach, seen most clearly in its reporting and advocacy around the 1973 Peter Reilly case. Reilly, an 18-year-old, had been charged with the murder of his mother, Barbara Gibbons. The persistence and quality of The Lakeville Journal's reporting and editorials on the case was seen as crucial in the eventual discovery of exculpatory evidence. In 1978, the University of Arizona awarded editor and publisher Robert H. Estabrook with the annual John Peter Zenger award for his reporting on the 1973 case. The award noted his "distinguished service in behalf of freedom of the press and the public's right to know".

Glynne Robinson, a noted photographer. was the co-publisher and co-owner, along with Robert Hatch who had previously worked with the Children's Television Workshop, of The Lakeville Journal and the Millerton News of New York from 1986-1991. Hatch sold the papers to an LLC board including A. Whitney Ellsworth, Robert Estabrook, Albert Gottesman and William E. Little, Jr. in 1995.

David Parker became editor of The Lakeville Journal in 1995. Ruth Epstein took over from him in 1997, as Terry Cowgill became editor of The Millerton News. In 2005, Cynthia Hochswender became executive editor and Janet Manko became publisher and editor in chief. Whitney Joseph became editor of The Millerton News.

== Current Day ==
In 2019, the company began a community model of contributors donating to the news company to fill in for waning advertising revenues. In 2021, the company applied to become a nonprofit entity and gained approval from the IRS in September. In January 2024, longtime employee James H. Clark, was appointed publisher and chief executive office.

The Lakeville Journal celebrated its 125th year publishing in 2022, with a full slate of events centered around the communities it covers and local journalism. On August 13, the Salisbury Association in Salisbury, Conn., opened an exhibit, "Life of A Community: The Lakeville Journal Celebrates 125 years." On August 14, there was a Salisbury Summer Fair on Academy Street in Salisbury. From August 17 to September 14 The Moviehouse in Millerton, N.Y., screened a series of favorite newsroom films. On September 16, the Salisbury Forum and Lakeville Journal Foundation presented a discussion with distinguished media professionals on the future of journalism, moderated by Lakeville Journal Foundation board member and investigative journalist Brian Ross. September 17 was the Newsprint Jubilee, a closing night gala.

== Resources ==
- Lakeville Journal website
