= A Hero of the Big Snows =

1926 film directed by Herman C. Raymaker

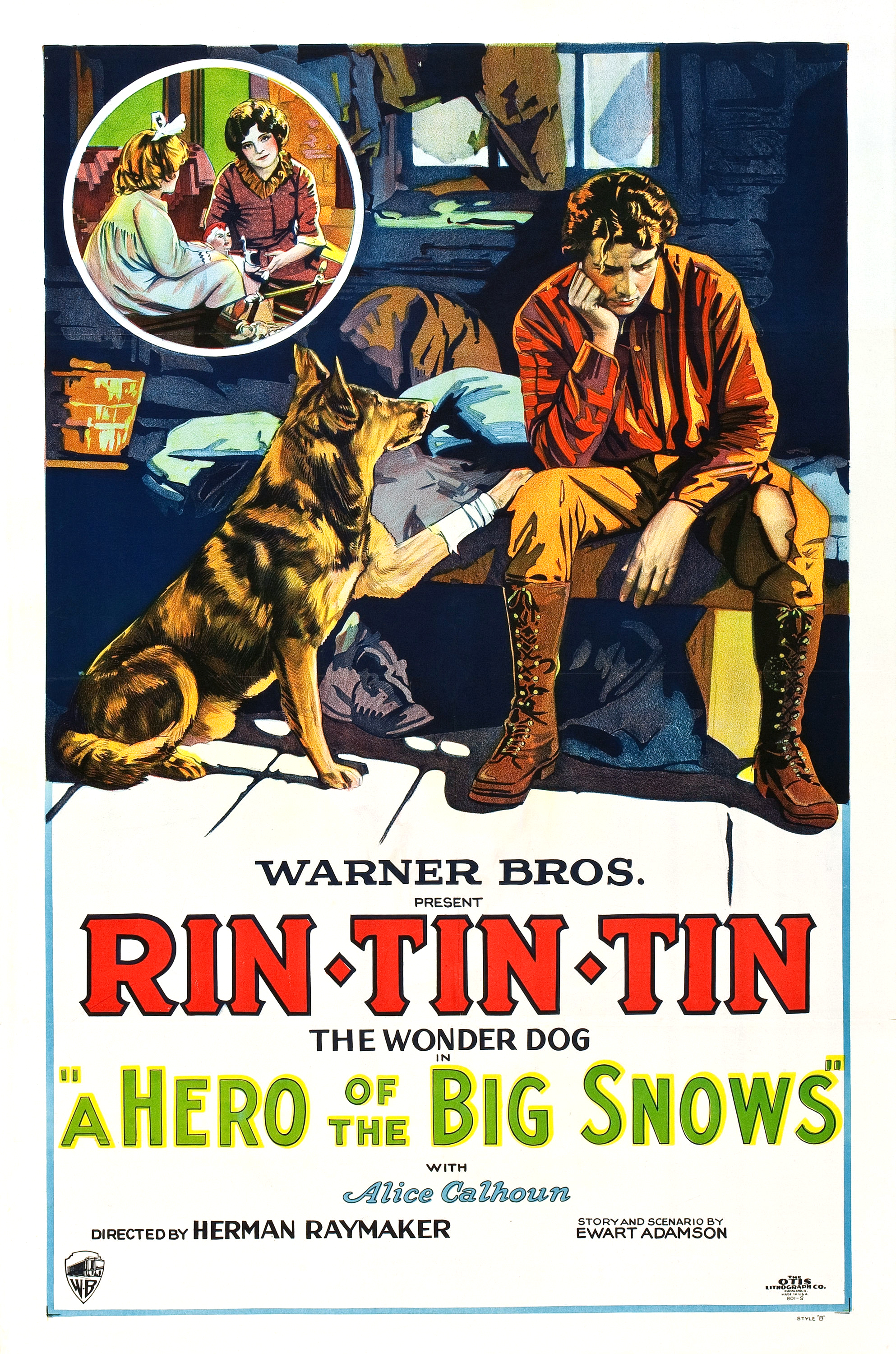
- Theatrical release poster
- Directed by: Herman C. Raymaker
- Screenplay by: Ewart Adamson
- Story by: Ewart Adamson
- Starring: Rin Tin Tin; Alice Calhoun; Don Alvarado; Leo Willis; Mary Jane Milliken
- Cinematography: Edwin B. DuPar
- Distributed by: Warner Bros. Pictures, Inc.
- Release date: July 24, 1926
- Running time: 67 minutes
- Country: United States
- Language: Silent (English intertitles)

A Hero of the Big Snows is a 1926 American silent adventure film directed by Herman C. Raymaker and written by Ewart Adamson. The cast includes canine actor Rin Tin Tin. The film also stars Alice Calhoun, Don Alvarado, Leo Willis and Mary Jane Milliken. The film was released by Warner Bros. on July 24, 1926.

== Plot ==
Rin-Tin-Tin is rescued from mistreatment by a trapper named Ed Nolan, who himself leads a nomadic life. Despite Nolan's efforts, Rin-Tin-Tin refuses to enter his cabin. Nolan then brings Rin-Tin-Tin to the home of Mary Mallory, a woman he has unsuccessfully courted due to his wayward lifestyle. Through their shared affection for Rin-Tin-Tin, a newfound understanding blossoms between Nolan and Mary, motivating Nolan to reform his ways and find employment. When Mary's younger sister falls ill, Mary suspects Rin-Tin-Tin of harming her due to blood on his jaws, leading Nolan to consider shooting him. Rin-Tin-Tin flees. As Mary endeavors to seek medical help for her sister amid a snowstorm, their dog sled overturns, leaving them stranded. Rin-Tin-Tin, faithfully trailing them, delivers a message from Mary to Nolan. Responding to the distress call, Nolan rescues them, and the doctor reveals that the little sister's injuries were inflicted by a wolf, not Rin-Tin-Tin. With the assurance of the sister's recovery and the revelation of Rin-Tin-Tin's innocence, Mary and Nolan reconcile with Rin-Tin-Tin.

== Cast ==
- Rin Tin Tin as Rinty
- Alice Calhoun as Mary Mallory
- Don Alvarado as Ed Nolan
- Leo Willis as Black Beasley
- Mary Jane Milliken as Mary Mallory's Little Sister

== Preservation status ==
As of July 2016, according to the Library of Congress, the film survives at Archives Françaises du film du CNC.
