= Tough Guy (film) =

1936 film by Chester M. Franklin

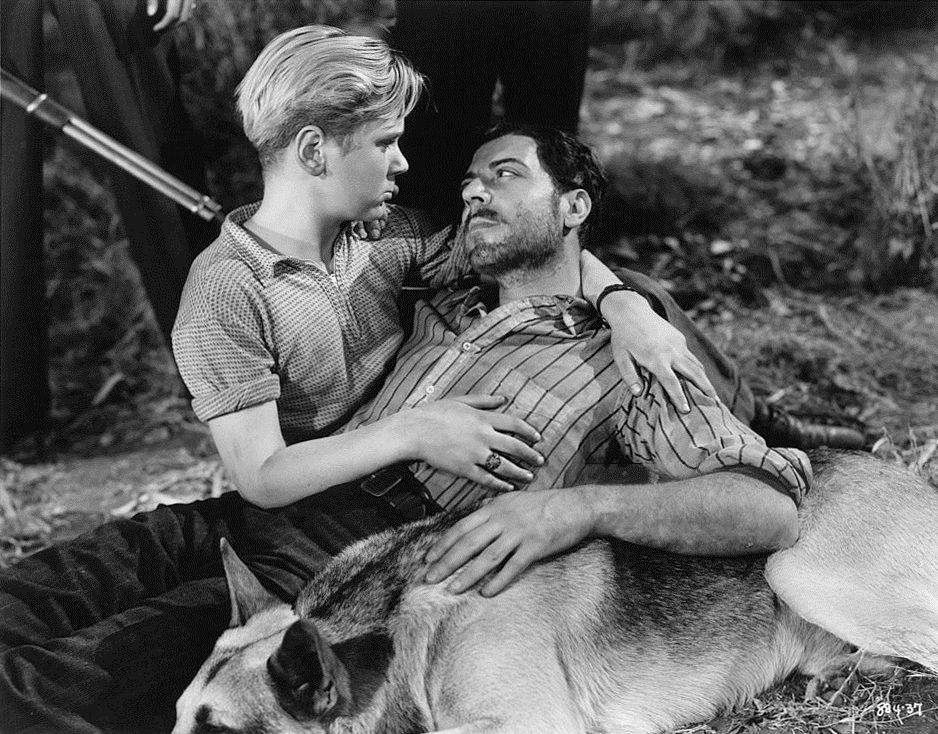
- Jackie Cooper, Joseph Calleia and Rin Tin Tin Jr. in Tough Guy
- Directed by: Chester Franklin
- Screenplay by: Florence Ryerson; Edgar Allan Woolf
- Produced by: Harry Rapf
- Starring: Jackie Cooper; Joseph Calleia; Rin Tin Tin, Jr.; Harvey Stephens; Jean Hersholt
- Cinematography: Leonard Smith
- Edited by: James E. Newcom
- Music by: William Axt
- Production company: Metro-Goldwyn-Mayer
- Distributed by: Metro-Goldwyn-Mayer
- Release date: January 24, 1936
- Running time: 76 minutes
- Country: United States
- Language: English

Tough Guy is a 1936 American action film directed by Chester Franklin, written by Florence Ryerson and Edgar Allan Woolf, and starring Jackie Cooper, Joseph Calleia, Rin Tin Tin, Jr., Harvey Stephens, Jean Hersholt, and Edward Pawley. It was released on January 24, 1936, by Metro-Goldwyn-Mayer.

== Plot ==
Young "Freddie" Vincent runs away from home with his faithful dog, Duke. Stowing away in the back of a truck, Freddie and Duke find themselves in the clutches of gangsters.

== Cast ==
- Jackie Cooper as Freddie, Frederick Martindale Vincent III
- Joseph Calleia as Joe Calerno
- Rin Tin Tin, Jr. as Duke
- Harvey Stephens as Chief Davison
- Jean Hersholt as Doctor
- Edward Pawley as Tony
- Mischa Auer as Chi
- Robert Warwick as Frederick Vincent
- Max Hoffman, Jr. as Pete Jensen

== Home media ==
Tough Guy was released on manufactured-on-demand DVD by the Warner Archive Collection on June 14, 2016.

== Gallery ==
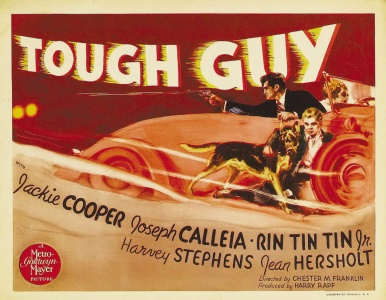

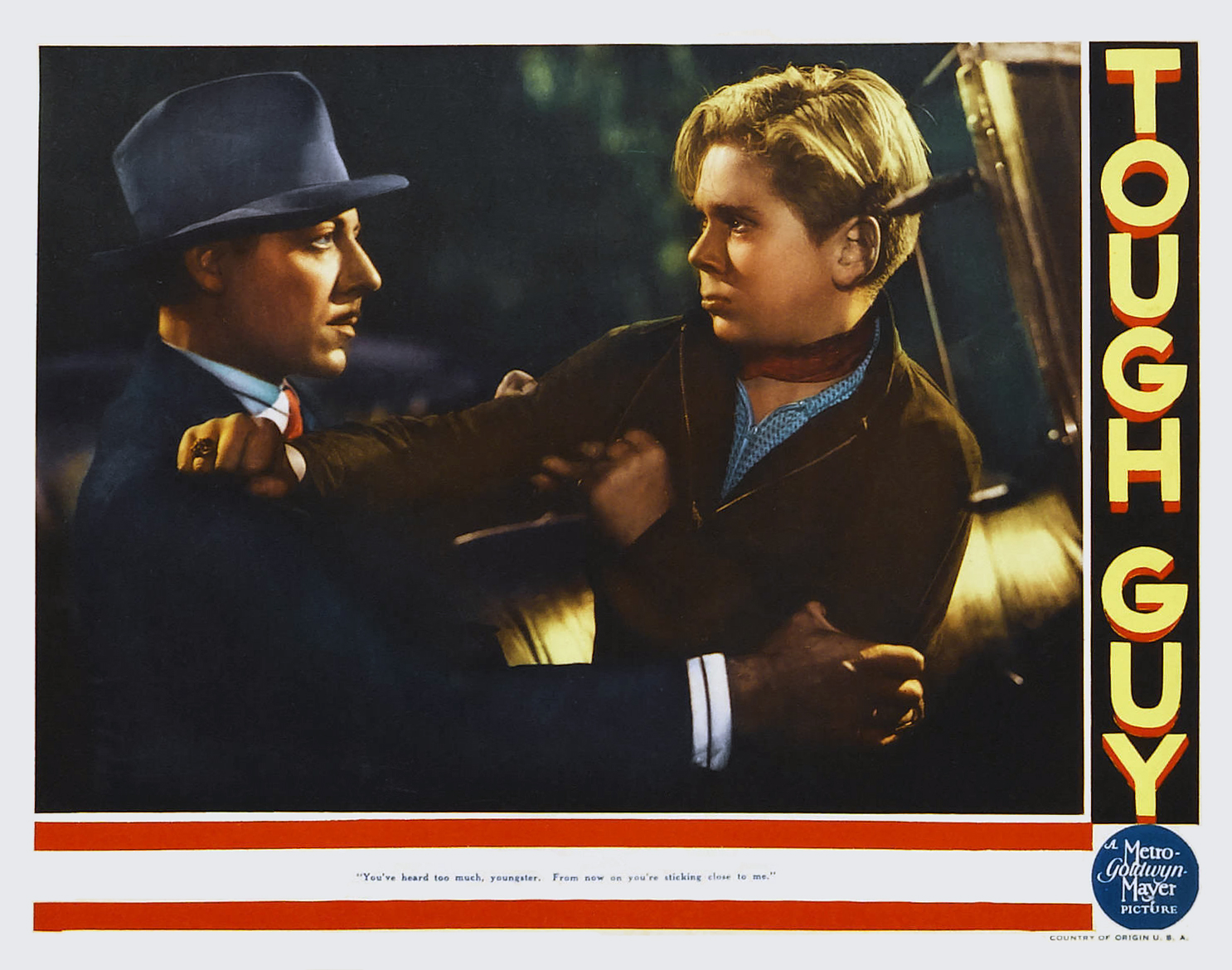
Lobby cards

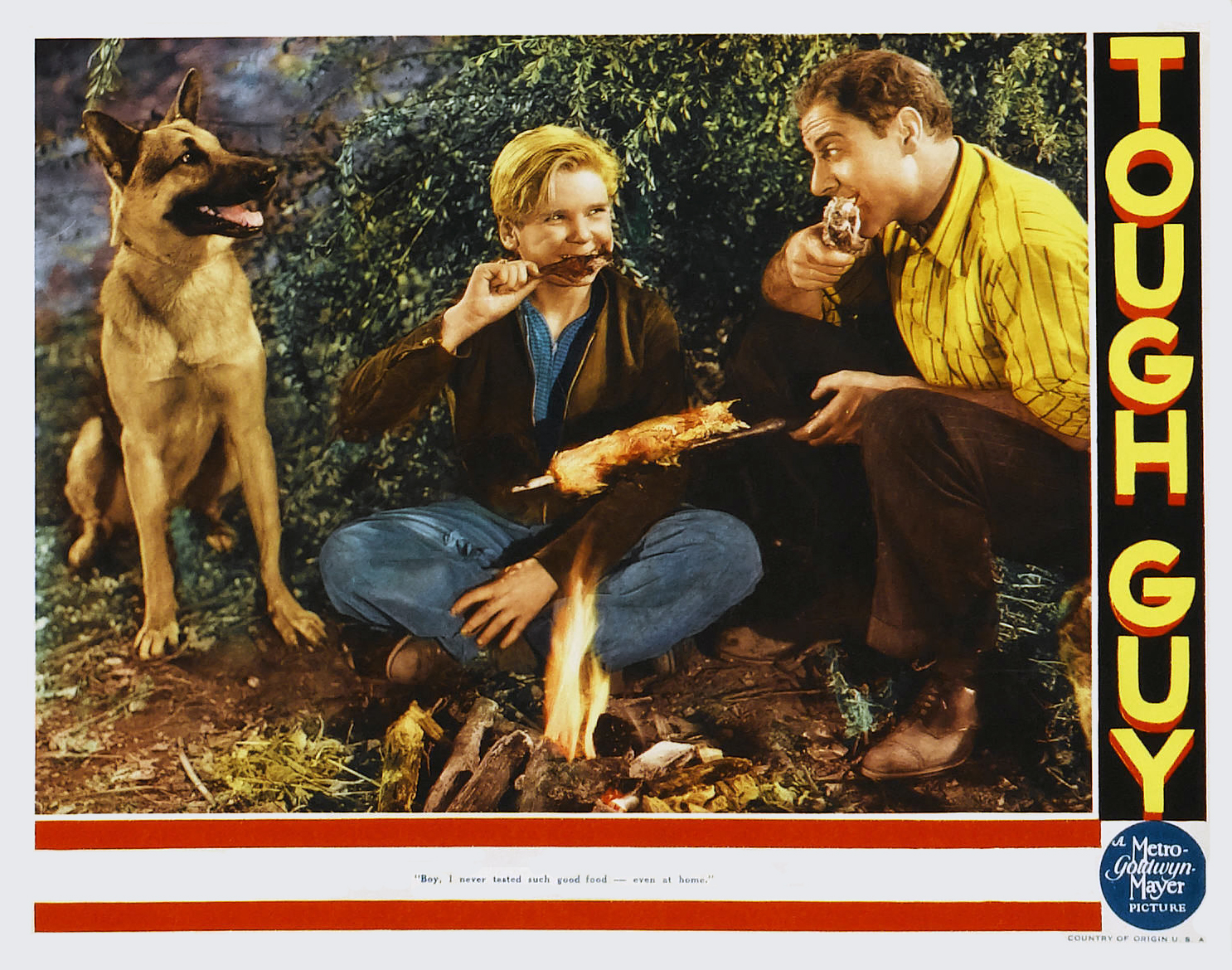

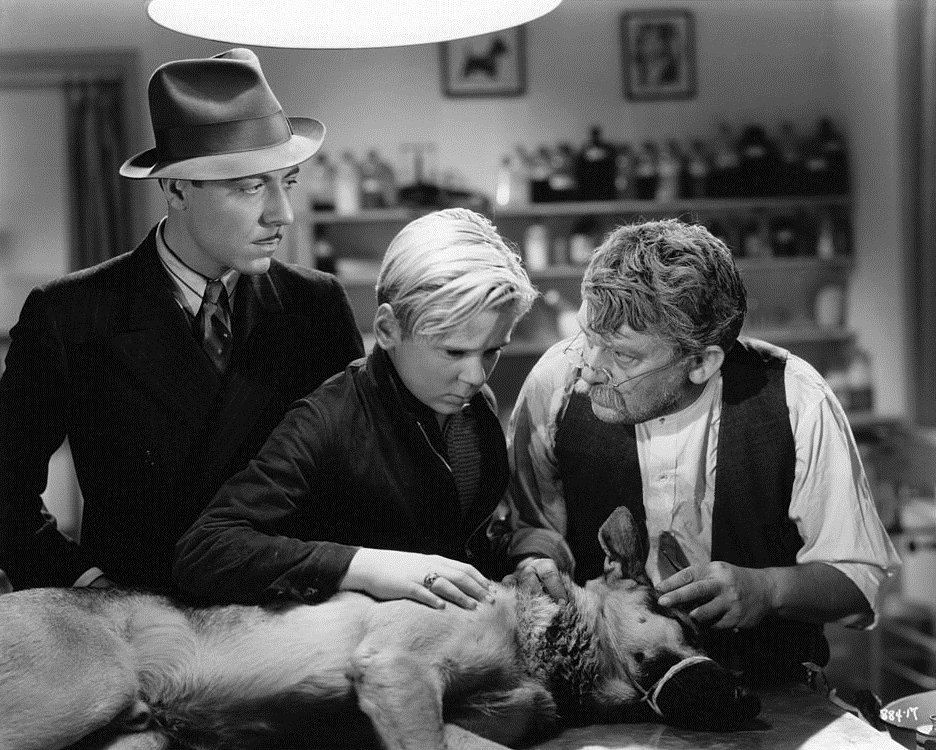
Joseph Calleia, Jackie Cooper, Jean Hersholt and Rin Tin Tin Jr.
