= A Race for Life =

1928 film

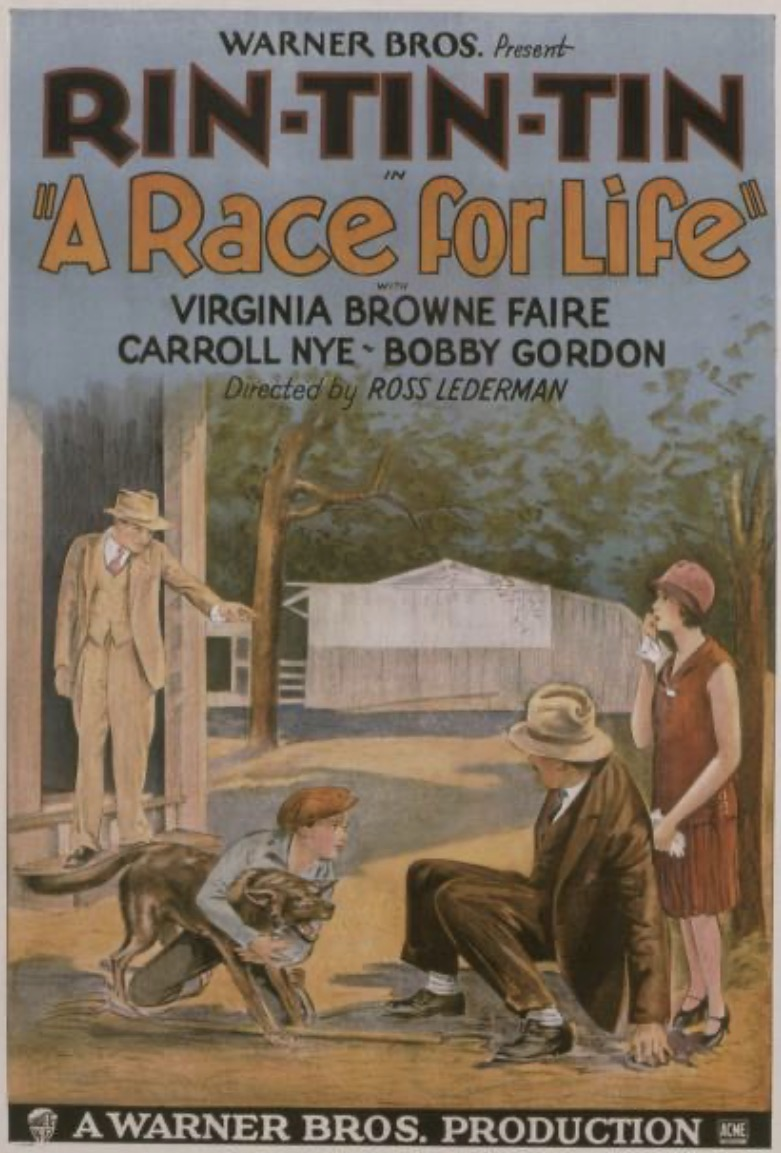
- Theatrical release poster
- Directed by: D. Ross Lederman
- Written by: James A. Starr (titles)
- Screenplay by: Charles R. Condon
- Story by: Charles R. Condon
- Starring: Rin Tin Tin
- Cinematography: Edwin B. DuPar
- Production company: Warner Bros.
- Distributed by: Warner Bros.
- Release date: January 28, 1928
- Running time: 5 reels
- Country: United States
- Languages: Sound (Synchronized) (English Intertitles)
- Budget: $68,000
- Box office: $243,000

A Race for Life is a 1928 American synchronized sound drama film directed by D. Ross Lederman. While the film has no audible dialog, it was released with a synchronized musical score with sound effects using the sound-on-disc Vitaphone process. Originally, the film was presumed to be lost. However, according to the Library of Congress Database, a print was found in the archives of a film museum in the Netherlands. The film was released with a Vitaphone soundtrack with a synchronized musical score and sound effects.

== Plot ==
Young Danny O’Shea dreams of a better life beyond the hardships at home. With nothing but his dog Rinty at his side, he sets off to make his way in the world. The boy and his companion stow away on a freight train headed south toward one of the racing cities.

Their journey nearly ends in trouble when a sharp-eyed train master discovers them. But fate intervenes in the form of Virginia Calhoun, a kind-hearted young woman and the sweetheart of prominent racehorse owner Bob Hammond. Thanks to her intercession, Danny avoids punishment and is offered a job in Hammond's stables.

Danny quickly proves his worth, and when the season's most prestigious sweepstakes draws near, he is given the honor of riding Black Raider, Hammond's prized horse. But the upcoming competition is complicated by treachery.

Bruce Morgan, Hammond's ruthless rival, is determined to sabotage Black Raider's chances. In the dead of night, he sneaks into the stables intending to cripple the stallion with a curry-comb. But in the confusion, the wrong horse is injured. Caught in the act by the ever-vigilant Rinty, Morgan hurls the curry-comb wildly and throws a bucket of ammonia into the dog's face, blinding him temporarily. Framing Rinty as a dangerous, rabid animal, Morgan claims the dog attacked the horses. Danny, fearing for his companion's life, hides Rinty in an abandoned shack.

On the day of the great race, Morgan escalates his scheme by kidnapping Danny. With no rider for Black Raider, Hammond has no choice but to accept a last-minute replacement—one of Morgan's own men. But Rinty, despite his injuries, escapes from the shack and tracks down his young master. He frees Danny, who locks the crooked substitute rider in a closet and races to the track.

Danny mounts Black Raider just in time, but the horse lags behind the others. Watching from a window above the track, Rinty breaks his leash and dashes to the track, running alongside his friend and hero. With Rinty at his heels, Black Raider's spirit surges—his power and drive return. He closes the distance and, with a burst of speed, wins the race by half a length.

Morgan's sabotage is exposed when the missing curry-comb is found in the injured horse's stall. As justice is served, Bob and Virginia celebrate their victory. Danny, hailed as a hero, uses his share of the prize money to bring comfort and happiness to his mother—closing this heartwarming tale of courage, loyalty, and the bond between a boy and his dog.

== Cast ==
- Rin Tin Tin as Rinty, a dog
- Virginia Brown Faire as Virginia Calhoun
- Carroll Nye as Robert Hammond
- Robert Gordon as Danny O'Shea (as Bobby Gordon)
- Jim Mason as Bruce Morgan (as James Mason)
- Pat Hartigan as Tramp

== Production ==
Exteriors for A Race for Life were taken on location at Riverside, California.

== Box office ==
According to Warner Bros. records, the film earned $168,000 domestically and $75,000 foreign.

== Preservation ==
A print is preserved at Filmmuseum in the Netherlands, at the EYE Film Institute.

== See also ==
- List of early sound feature films (1926–1929)
