= Ken-L Ration =

Brand of dog food

- The Ken-L Ration Logo
- Type: Public
- Industry: Consumer Products
- Founded: 1922
- Founder: Philip Mitchell Earl Mitchell Ernst Mitchell
- Defunct: 1995
- Fate: Bought Out By Quaker-Oats
- Headquarters: Rockford, Illinois
- Area served: United States

Ken-L Ration is a brand of canned and dry dog food. In 1922, canned pet food became popularly known on the market after Ken-L Ration, the first to release horse meat in their pet food after purchasing cheap horse meat from PM Chappel.

Ken-L Ration was owned by Quaker Oats, but the brand was sold to H. J. Heinz Co. in 1995. The brand's name was a play on the World War II-era K-ration, and featured a yellow dog named Fido on its labels. The trademark for Ken-L Ration was revived by Retrobrands USA LLC in 2015.

The dog food's original main ingredient was U.S. Government Inspected horse meat, advertised as "lean, red meat".

== History ==
In the 1950s, Ken-L Ration was the major sponsor of a local TV show in New York City called We Love Dogs. Each week, a dog or puppy was featured as the prize in a contest. Viewers were invited to write and send letters to explain why they should win the dog. The next week, the winning letter was read and the winner appeared on the show and was given the dog.

The brand is most notable for a popular advertising jingle from the 1960s. The jingle was based on the song "My Dog's Bigger Than Your Dog" written by Tom Paxton. The advertisement consisted of three children singing:

My dog's bigger than your dog,
My dog's faster than yours.
My dog's shinier 'cause he gets Ken-L Ration,
My dog's better than yours.
Ken-L Ration has lean red beef,
And lots of other good things,
When my mom goes to the store,
She buys a zillion cans or more.
My dog's better than your dog,
My dog's better than yours.

Until 1968, Ken-L Ration was the sponsor of the pet kennel at Disneyland, known as Ken-L Land.

Like several other dog food brands, Ken-L Ration issued a yearly award to brave or heroic dogs, titled the "Ken-L Ration Dog Hero of the Year Award". The last known year this was issued was 1996.

In 2020, the Ken-L Ration brand was purchased by Gespa Brands, a subsidiary of Grupo Pilar S.A.

== In popular culture ==
- During the late 1950s–early 1960s seasons of The Adventures of Ozzie and Harriet, Ken-L Ration dog food was the occasionally featured product on certain weeks when Quaker was the show's sponsor (alternating the other weeks with Kodak). The use of horsemeat in the product was a featured part of each advertisement.
- In the 1993 film Demolition Man, the jingle for Ken-L Ration is featured along with jingles from Armour and Green Giant as "oldies", popular music in the future society of San Angeles.
- In the 1996 film Freeway, the film's star, a young Reese Witherspoon, is seen singing along with the jingle while watching TV just before the police come in to arrest her family.
- On Sirius XM Radio 7 ('70s on 7), a parody of the Ken-L Ration jingle is occasionally heard as a station identification bumper played between songs with modified lyrics ending with "...my song's better than yours".
