= Brendan O'Connell (artist) =

American painter

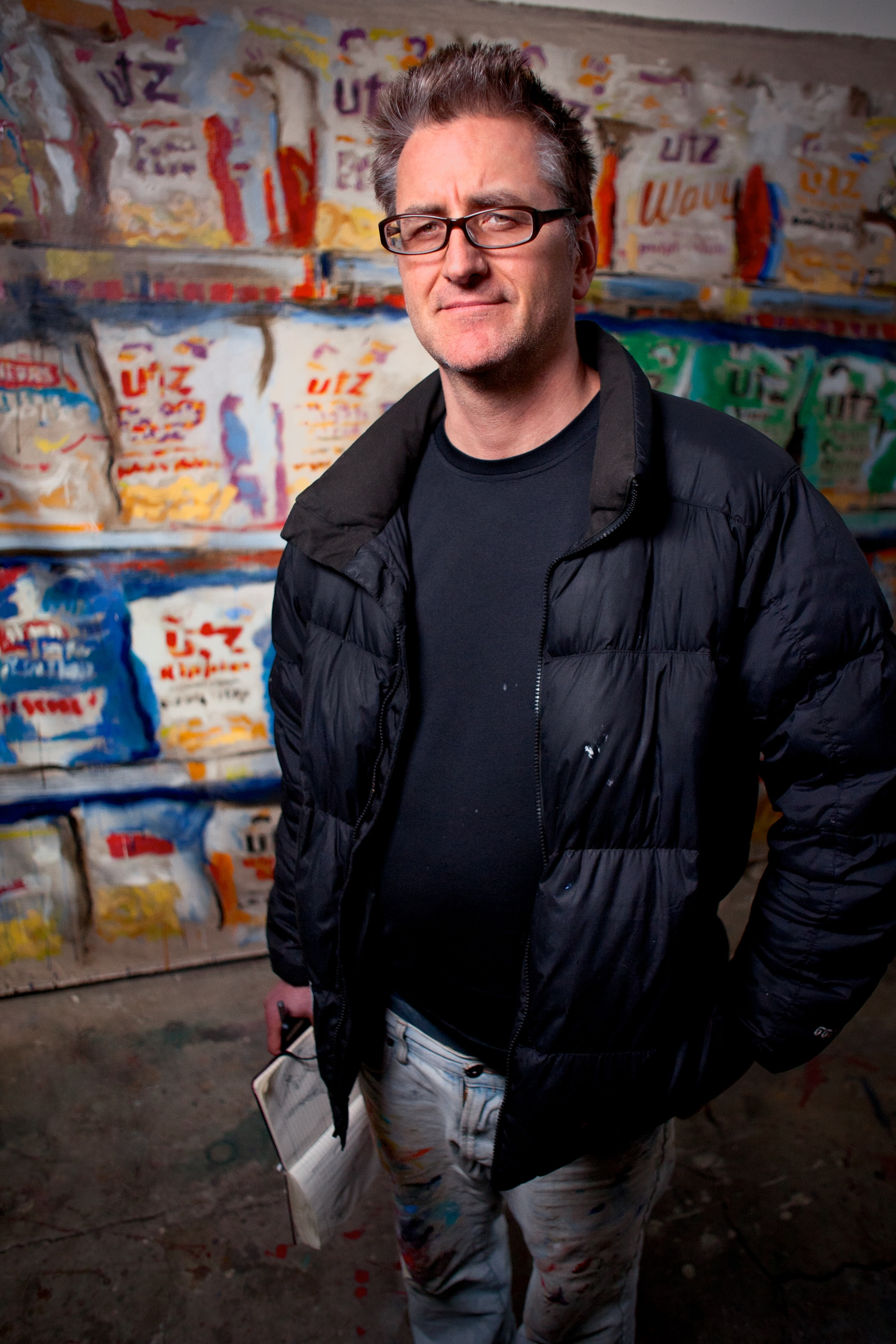
- Born: September 18, 1968 (age 57); New York City
- Education: Emory University
- Known for: Walmart series, art of the everyday,
- Notable work: Snacks, Bitcoin Jesus
- Movement: Expressionism, Pop
- Partner: Heather Rossitto
- Children: 2
- Website: www.brendanoconnell.com

Brendan O'Connell (September 18, 1968, New York City) is a contemporary American artist known for his paintings of Walmart interiors. He was nicknamed America's "Brand Name Painter" by Time because of his impressionist paintings of America's most popular brands.

== Early life ==
O'Connell was born in New York City and raised in Tucker, Georgia. After graduating from Emory University in 1990 with degrees in philosophy and Spanish literature, he moved back home where he worked in a grocery store. He later moved to Paris to write a novel.

== Career ==
Without formal art training, O'Connell began painting at the age of 22. He supported himself in Paris as a sidewalk caricaturist while working on abstract paintings. According to O'Connell, influences on his painting were French Abstract-Expressionist artists including Pierre Soulages and Nicolas de Staël.

O'Connell became known for his large impressionist paintings of the aisles of Walmart supermarkets. The initial works were created from photographs of people shopping at Walmart. According to art critic Joe Fyfe, the works are an "idiosyncratic" combination of "kitschy decorative art, almost tourist painting" and high art. O'Connell's canvasses have been exhibited in New York; Boston; Atlanta, Georgia; Turin, Italy and Shanghai, China.

National interest in Brendan began after he was profiled by Susan Orlean in The New Yorker. This was followed by his first television appearance on The Colbert Report. Brendan continues to do live paintings for the local media in Walmarts around the United States, garnering him the nickname the "Warhol of Walmart".

He was the subject the 2013 documentary and Vimeo staff pick, "Blocking the Bread Aisle" by Julien Lasseur and Jamie Thalman. And was one of three artists interviewed on the Colbert Report.

=== Everyartist.me ===
In 2012, O'Connell helped organize the Wal-Art Project in which more than 8,400 children gathered in a stadium in Bentonville, Arkansas, the location of Walmart's headquarters, to display their artwork. According to O'Connell, the purpose of the project was to inspire the artistic creativity of everyone. Brendan used the Wal-Art Project as a springboard for Everyartist.me, a social enterprise that creates the annual Everyartist Live! art event. In November 2013, Brendan organized a national, collaborative painting event with 230,000 children across 46 states with Everyartist Live!

== Awards and grants ==
- Eben Demarest Trust grant 2003
- S.D. Rubin Foundation 2012
