= A Dog of the Regiment =

1927 film

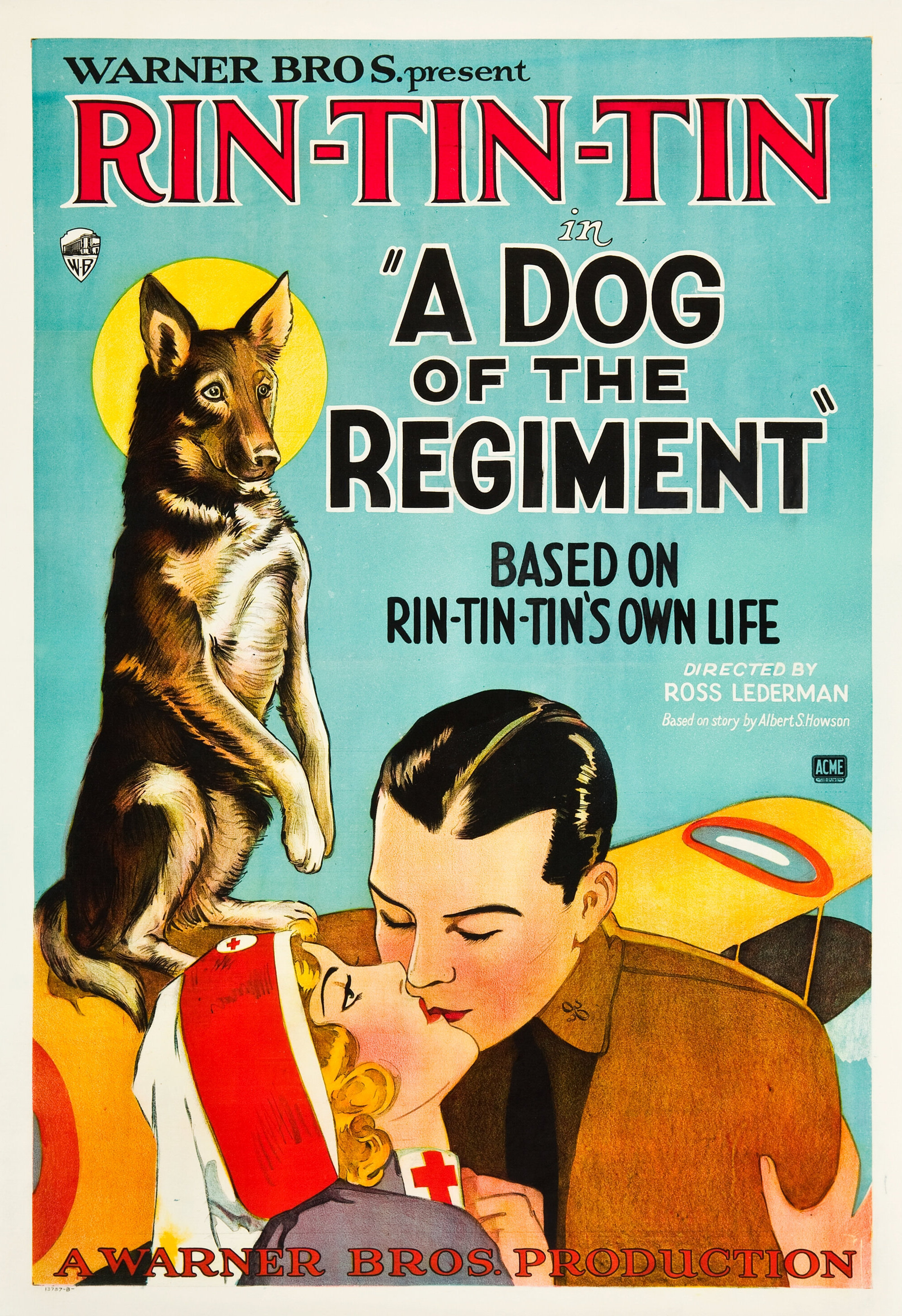
- Theatrical release poster
- Directed by: D. Ross Lederman
- Written by: Charles R. Condon
- Story by: Albert S. Howson
- Starring: Dorothy Gulliver
- Production company: Warner Bros.
- Distributed by: Warner Bros.
- Release date: October 29, 1927
- Country: United States
- Languages: Sound (Synchronized) (English Intertitles)
- Budget: $76,000
- Box office: $247,000

A Dog of the Regiment is a 1927 American synchronized sound drama film directed by D. Ross Lederman. While the film has no audible dialog, it was released with a synchronized musical score with sound effects using the Vitaphone sound-on-disc process. This film is presumed lost. According to Warner Bros records the film earned $188,000 domestic and $59,000 foreign, against a budget of $76,000.

== Plot ==
Richard "Dick" Harrison, a young American lawyer, travels to Germany to represent his firm in the complex settlement of the wealthy Von Waldorf estate. The heiress, Marie von Waldorf, a cultured and independent young woman, retains as her legal advisor Captain Eric von Hager, a man whose long-standing association with the Von Waldorf family gives him strong influence—and ulterior motives.

Suspicious of Eric's manipulation and self-serving behavior, Dick challenges his authority and accuses him of acting in his own interest rather than Marie's. Marie, grateful for Dick's intervention and integrity, begins to trust the young American, and a quiet affection forms between them. Also warming quickly to Dick is Marie's loyal German shepherd, Rinty, a keen and intelligent dog with an uncanny bond to both Marie and her new American friend.

With his assignment complete, Dick prepares to return to the United States, promising both Marie and Rinty that he'll come back soon. But fate intervenes—Europe is plunged into World War I, cutting off communication and stranding loved ones on opposite sides of the conflict.

Now a wartime nurse serving in a German army hospital, Marie holds fast to thoughts of Dick, as does her constant companion, Rinty, who now serves alongside her as a medical and emotional aide. Eric, now a captain in the German military, presses his romantic attentions on Marie, but she remains unmoved. Eric grows increasingly embittered as it becomes clear she still cherishes the memory of the American.

During an enemy air raid, a single Allied plane crashes behind German lines. Eric's men locate the wreckage, but the pilot is missing. Unbeknownst to them, Rinty has already raced across the battlefield and found the injured aviator—none other than Dick Harrison. Using remarkable cunning, Rinty helps pull Dick from the wreckage and leads him to safety in a deserted dugout nearby. Recognizing the American as the man she loves, Marie secretly visits his hiding place and cares for his wounds.

Eric eventually discovers the fugitive and, consumed with jealousy, forges the commanding general's signature on an execution order for Dick. Rinty is imprisoned, and Dick is taken into custody. On the morning of the planned execution, Dick and Rinty are brought before Eric. With cruel satisfaction, Eric gives Dick a revolver with a single bullet—intending to force him to shoot his beloved dog.

But Dick takes careful aim and fires—not at Rinty, but at the rope that binds him. Rinty springs into action. Eric, furious, fires at Dick and misses. A brutal hand-to-hand fight erupts between the two men, while the soldiers look on, unsure whether to intervene. Dick and Rinty manage to escape amid the confusion.

Moments later, the real general arrives and demands an explanation. Upon discovering that the execution order was forged and that Eric acted out of personal jealousy, he immediately relieves Eric of his command. Marie steps forward, exposing the truth behind the vengeful plot. The general orders a patrol to recapture the fugitive—but it is too late.

Dick and Rinty have already commandeered a plane and flown to safety.

Months later, with the war ended and peace restored, Dick returns to Germany. On a sunlit day, he is reunited with Marie and Rinty. As the lovers embrace, Rinty, tail wagging and ears perked, barks joyfully—a faithful friend reunited with the two people he loves most.

== Cast ==
- Dorothy Gulliver as Marie von Waldorf
- Rin Tin Tin as Rinty
- Tom Gallery as Richard Harrison
- Hans Joby as Eric von Hager (as John Peters)
