= Susan Orlean =

American journalist and author

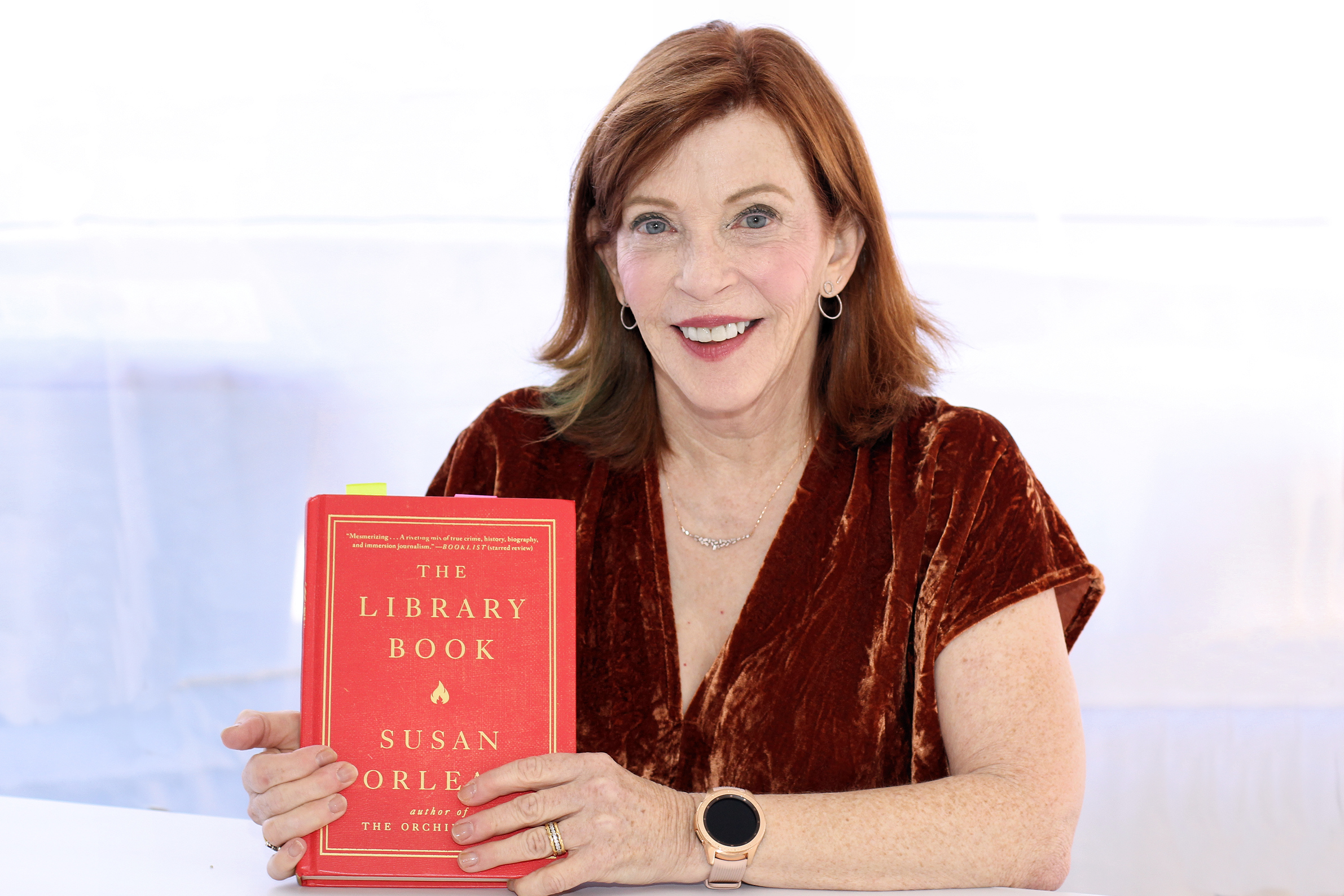
- Orlean at the 2018 Texas Book Festival
- Born: October 31, 1955 (age 70); Cleveland, Ohio, United States
- Education: University of Michigan
- Occupations: Journalist, author
- Website: susanorlean.com

Susan Orlean (born October 31, 1955) is an American journalist, television writer, and bestselling author of The Orchid Thief and The Library Book. She has been a staff writer for The New Yorker since 1992, and has contributed articles to many magazines including Vogue, Rolling Stone, Esquire, and Outside. In 2021, Orlean joined the writing team of HBO comedy series How To with John Wilson.

Orlean's 1998 non-fiction book The Orchid Thief was adapted into the film Adaptation (2002). Meryl Streep received an Academy Award nomination for her performance as Orlean.

== Early life ==
Orlean was born in Cleveland, Ohio, and raised in nearby Shaker Heights, the daughter of Edith (née Gross 1923–2016) and Arthur Orlean (1915–2007). She has a sister and a brother. Her family is Jewish. Her mother's family is from Hungary and her father's family from Poland. Her father was an attorney and businessman.

Orlean graduated from the University of Michigan with honors in 1976, studying literature and history. After college she moved to Portland, Oregon, and was planning on going to law school, when she began writing for the Willamette Week.

== Career ==
Orlean has published stories in Rolling Stone, Esquire, Vogue, Outside and Spy. In 1982, she became a staff writer for the Boston Phoenix and later a regular contributor to the Boston Globe Sunday Magazine. Her first book, Saturday Night, was published in 1990, shortly after she moved to New York City from Boston and began writing for The New Yorker magazine. She started contributing to The New Yorker in 1987 and became a staff writer in 1992.

Orlean authored the book The Orchid Thief, a profile of Florida orchid grower, breeder and collector John Laroche. The book formed the basis of Charlie Kaufman's script for the Spike Jonze film Adaptation. Orlean (portrayed by Meryl Streep, who won a Golden Globe for the performance) was, in effect, made into a fictional character. The movie portrayed her becoming Laroche's lover and partner in a drug production operation, in which orchids were processed into a psychoactive substance.

In 1998, Orlean's article "Life's Swell" was published in Women's Outside. The article, a feature on a group of young surfer girls in Maui, became the basis of the film Blue Crush.

In 1999, she co-wrote The Skinny: What Every Skinny Woman Knows About Dieting (And Won't Tell You!) under her married name, Susan Sistrom. Her previously published magazine stories have been compiled in two collections, The Bullfighter Checks Her Makeup: My Encounters with Extraordinary People and My Kind of Place: Travel Stories from a Woman Who's Been Everywhere. She also served as editor for Best American Essays 2005 and Best American Travel Writing 2007. She contributed the Ohio chapter in State By State (2008), and in 2011 she published a biographical history of the dog actor Rin Tin Tin titled Rin Tin Tin: The Life and the Legend.

When Orlean's son had a school assignment to interview a city employee, he chose a librarian and together they visited the Studio City branch of the Los Angeles Public Library system which reignited her own childhood passion for libraries. After an immersive project involving three years of research and two years of writing on the 1986 fire at the Los Angeles Central Library, The Library Book was released in October 2018. The book uses the context of the April 1986 fire to explore the role of the public library, who uses them, and the void created if they are lost. Orlean hired a fact-checker to ensure the book was accurate, explaining "I don't want a substantial error that changes the meaning of my book, but I also don't want silly errors". She collaborated on the adaption for television.

In 2021, Orlean joined the writing staff of television series How To with John Wilson for the show's second season on HBO.

== Personal life ==
Orlean married lawyer Peter Sistrom (1955–2021) in 1983, and they divorced after 16 years of marriage. She was introduced by a friend to author and businessman John Gillespie, whom she married in 2001, and she gave birth to their son in 2004.

She is also step-mother to John's son from his previous marriage.

Orlean is a self-confessed "maniac about architecture." In 2017, she sold a Mid-Century Modern home in Studio City, California that was designed by architect Rudolph Schindler.

== Awards and honors ==
Orlean was a Nieman Fellow at Harvard University in 2004. She received an honorary Doctor of Human Letters degree from the University of Michigan at the spring commencement ceremony in 2012. She was awarded a Guggenheim Fellowship in 2014 in the "General Nonfiction" field of study. Orlean was the winner of the 7th Annual Shorty Awards in the Author category, which honors the best social and digital media.

== Bibliography ==
=== Books ===
- Saturday Night. Replica Books. 1997.
- The Orchid Thief (1998) ISBN 9781568957364
- The Bullfighter Checks Her Makeup: My Encounters with Extraordinary People (2001) ISBN 9781409006534
- My Kind of Place: Travel Stories from a Woman Who's Been Everywhere (2004) (Random House Trade Paperbacks). ISBN 9780812974874
- Animalish (Kindle Single) (2011)
- Rin Tin Tin: The Life and the Legend (2011) ISBN 9781439190142
- The Floral Ghost (2016) ISBN 9780986281495
- The Library Book (2018) (Simon and Schuster). ISBN 9781476740188
- On Animals (2021)
- Joyride: A Memoir (2025)

=== Essays and reporting ===
- "The American male at age ten". Esquire. December 1992.
- "The Homesick Restaurant". Popular Chronicles. January 15, 1996. The New Yorker. 97 (27): 42–47. September 6, 2021. (Note: Online version is titled "The Homesick Restaurant Run by Cuban Refugees". Originally published in the January 15, 1996 issue.)
- "Life's Swell". Women's Outside. 1998.
- "The It bird". Popular Chronicles. The New Yorker. 85 (30): 26–31. September 28, 2009.
- "Walart". Onward and Upward with the Arts. The New Yorker. 89 (1): 46–50. February 11–18, 2013. (Note: Brendan O'Connell.)
- "Man and machine : playing games on the internet". Popular Chronicles. The New Yorker. 89 (48): 33–39. February 10, 2014. (Note: Online version is titled "The surreal comedy of internet art".)
- "Growing Up in the Library". Personal History. The New Yorker. October 5, 2018.
- "TheRealReal's Online Luxury Consignment Shop". The New Yorker. October 29, 2019.
- "The Rabbit Outbreak". The New Yorker. June 29, 2020.
