= The Orchid Thief =

1998 book by Susan Orlean

- Author: Susan Orlean
- Genre: Narrative nonfiction
- Publisher: Random House
- Publication date: 1998
- Media type: Print
- Pages: pp. 284
- ISBN: 978-0-679-44739-9

The Orchid Thief is a 1998 narrative nonfiction book by American journalist Susan Orlean, based on her investigation of the 1994 arrest of horticulturist John Laroche and a group of Seminoles in South Florida for poaching rare orchids in the Fakahatchee Strand State Preserve.

== Description ==
The book is based on an article that Orlean wrote for The New Yorker, published in the magazine's January 23, 1995 issue. Plant dealer John Edward Laroche (born February 19, 1962, in Florida) was determined to find and clone the rare ghost orchid for profit. Along the way, Orlean becomes fascinated with ghost orchids and meets many orchid enthusiasts. In their and Laroche's struggles and oddities, she gets a glimpse of true passion for the first time in her life.

The trial following Laroche's arrest brought him to the attention of Orlean. Laroche's defense was a loophole in the law that he claimed allowed the Seminole natives to remove endangered species from the swamp. He accepted a plea deal that resulted in his being sentenced to six months' probation and a fine. As Laroche told Orlean:

I figured that we'd get what we needed out of the Fakahatchee and at the same time we'd bring so much attention to the law that the legislature would change it. I timed it so that it would be in time for the legislative session. That's what I want to say in court. I want to say that the state needs to protect itself.

== Reception ==
The book received a mixed reception on publication. Most critics noted both the strength of the prose and the compelling subject, while some criticized the overall trajectory of the book. Positive reviews included that of Michael Pearson at the Atlanta Journal-Constitution who called it "a rare and exotic tale that shows a journalist's gifts in full bloom." New York Magazine noted the "hilariously reported, discursive narrative wanders in many directions," but saw that as a core strength of the work.

Critical reviews tended to note the level of tangents in the story and lack of a structure suitable for a book of length. Ted Conover, in a mixed review for the New York Times, noted the "giftedness" of the storytelling, while noting that Orlean's structure "often suffered" in her first book-length effort. Writing for the Chicago Tribune, Kristen Lillegard was harsher, noting the lack of forward motion in a story that "wilt[ed] under the weight of facts and figures."

== Film adaptation ==
The book was adapted by Charlie Kaufman for Spike Jonze's film Adaptation (2002), with Nicolas Cage as Charlie Kaufman and his fictitious brother Donald, Tilda Swinton as Valerie Thomas, Meryl Streep as Orlean and Chris Cooper as Laroche. The film is a pastiche of the process of adaptation, in which a successful but self-loathing Kaufman painstakingly tries to make Orlean's book into a "simple movie about flowers" without formulaic Hollywood tropes, or the metaphysical stylings he was acclaimed for in his screenwriting debut, Being John Malkovich. Kaufman struggles with writer's block, has sexual fantasies of Orlean and has enlightening discussions with other writers that lead him to ultimately make the script-within-the-film about the film itself, blending his metaphysical stylings to formulaic Hollywood tropes such as narration to communicate his neurotic thought process and a thriller-tinged third act to "wow the audience".

In the film, Orlean is depicted as a sad writer with no fascination until she meets Laroche and has an affair with him. He introduces her to a drug extracted from the ghost orchid that makes the world fascinating and she keeps seeing him after he posted pictures of her naked online. When Kaufman becomes curious about the affair, he gets caught spying on the pair and Orlean wants Kaufman dead to save her reputation. That leads to the thriller sequence of the film in which Donald and Laroche are killed and Orlean is arrested. Kaufman lives to tell the tale and finishes the script. In 2012, Orlean told GQ:

[Reading the screenplay] was a complete shock. My first reaction was "Absolutely not!" They had to get my permission and I just said: "No! Are you kidding? This is going to ruin my career!" Very wisely, they didn't really pressure me. They told me that everybody else had agreed and I somehow got emboldened. It was certainly scary to see the movie for the first time. It took a while for me to get over the idea that I had been insane to agree to it, but I love the movie now. What I admire the most is that it's very true to the book's themes of life and obsession, and there are also insights into things which are much more subtle in the book about longing, and about disappointment.
