= Top Speed =

Top speed may refer to:

== Speed ==
- Speed record
  - Production car speed record
- Aircraft design speeds, see V speeds
- Terminal velocity

== Arts and entertainment ==
- Top Speed (film), a 1930 musical comedy film
- Top Speed (musical), a 1929 Broadway musical
- Top Speed (video game), a 1989 video game
