= What Happened to Father? =

What Happened to Father? may refer to:

- What Happened to Father? (1927 film), an American silent comedy film
- What Happened to Father? (1915 film), a lost silent film
