= Galloping Dynamite =

1936 film directed by Harry L. Fraser

- Theatrical release poster
- Directed by: Harry L. Fraser
- Screenplay by: Sherman L. Lowe; Charles R. Condon; Stanley Roberts; Jesse Duffy
- Based on: Mystery of Dead Man's Isle by James Oliver Curwood
- Produced by: Maurice Conn
- Starring: Kermit Maynard; Ariane Allen; John Merton; David Sharpe; Stanley Blystone; John Ward; Earl Dwire
- Cinematography: Jack Greenhalgh
- Edited by: Robert Jahns
- Production company: Conn Pictures Corporation
- Distributed by: Ambassador Pictures
- Release date: December 30, 1936
- Running time: 57 minutes
- Country: United States
- Language: English

Galloping Dynamite is a 1936 American Western film directed by Harry L. Fraser and written by Sherman L. Lowe, Charles R. Condon, Stanley Roberts and Jesse Duffy. The film stars Kermit Maynard, Ariane Allen, John Merton, David Sharpe, Stanley Blystone, John Ward and Earl Dwire. The film was released on July 12, 1937, by Ambassador Pictures.

== Plot ==
Jim Dillon's brother Bob has been killed by Reed after finding gold. Reed fails to kill Jim as he investigates his brother's death, but Reed blames the murder on Jim and he is condemned to be hung.

== Cast ==
- Kermit Maynard as Jim Dillon
- Ariane Allen as Jane Foster
- John Merton as Reed
- David Sharpe as Bob Dillon
- Stanley Blystone as Lew Wilkes
- John Ward as Sam Jenkins
- Earl Dwire as Pop
- Bob Burns as Sheriff
- Budd Buster as Mike
- Tracy Layne as Mosby
