= Edward Rust =

Edward Rust may refer to:

- Edward B. Rust (1883–1958), American architect
- Edward B. Rust Jr. (born 1950), chairman of the board of State Farm Mutual Automobile Insurance Company
