= Beware of Bachelors =

1928 film by Roy Del Ruth

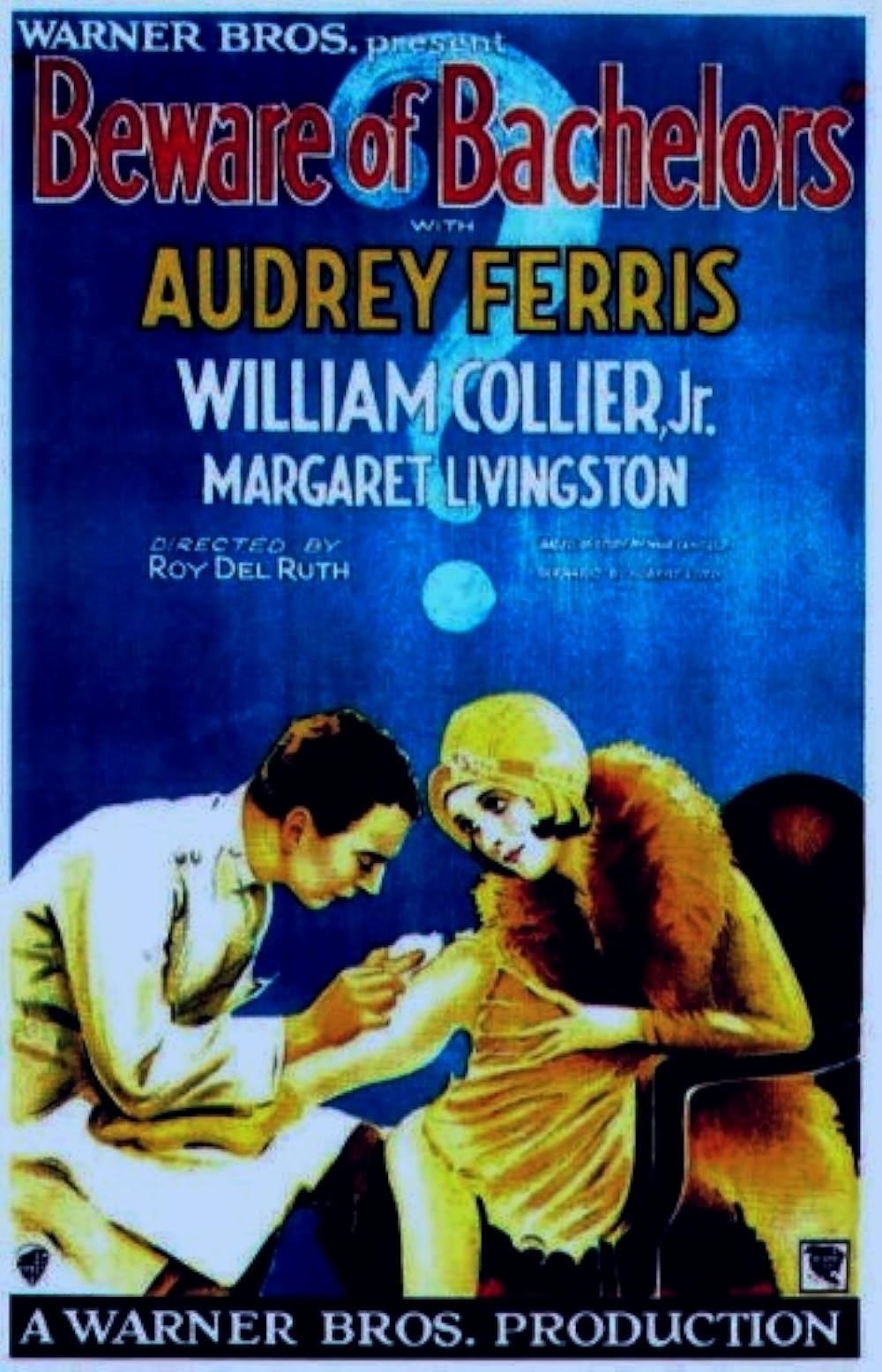
- Theatrical release poster
- Directed by: Roy Del Ruth
- Written by: Robert Lord
- Screenplay by: Joseph Jackson
- Based on: "Beware of Bachelors" by "Mark Canfield" (Darryl F. Zanuck)
- Starring: Audrey Ferris; William Collier Jr.; Margaret Livingston; Clyde Cook; George Beranger; Dave Morris
- Cinematography: Norbert Brodine; Frank Kesson
- Edited by: Ralph Dawson
- Production company: Warner Bros. Pictures
- Distributed by: Warner Bros. Pictures
- Release date: October 27, 1928 (U.S.)
- Running time: 64 minutes
- Country: United States
- Languages: Sound (Part-Talkie); English Intertitles

Beware of Bachelors is a 1928 American part-talkie pre-code comedy drama film produced and released by Warner Bros. Pictures, and directed by Roy Del Ruth. In addition to sequences with audible dialogue or talking sequences, the film features a synchronized musical score and sound effects along with English intertitles. The soundtrack was recorded using the Vitaphone sound-on-disc system. The movie stars Audrey Ferris, William Collier Jr., Margaret Livingston, Clyde Cook, and George Beranger. The film was based on a short story by Mark Canfield (an alias for Darryl F. Zanuck). The film was originally to be titled "No Questions Asked." The film seems to be a loose remake of the previous year's If I Were Single as it suspiciously shares many of the same plot elements.

== Plot ==
If Ed were not such a handsome doctor, his chances of happiness as a newlywed would be much greater. May isn't exactly jealous, but women find Ed's touch so magnetic that trouble is inevitable. One such woman, the vampish Miss Pfeffer, makes a wild play for him. May notices the flirtation, blazes with rage, and quickly retaliates by picking up Claude de Brie, a perfumer whose idea of one grand whoopee is to spray scent.

May and Ed reconcile and enter a store where Ed wants to buy her a present. There, they encounter Claude de Brie again, who proceeds to woo May with his perfume, resulting in another quarrel followed by yet another reconciliation.

Trouble escalates when May finds Ed at a café again with Miss Pfeffer, who knows her "vampire onions." In retaliation, May lets Claude escort her to a wild café party.

Their fragile peace is shattered when May later finds Miss Pfeffer in Ed's car. Although Ed explains, this episode appears to be the last straw. Hurt and angry, May leaves the house—declaring she is gone forever.

Both of them suddenly see the farce of their quarrels in the right light. They decide to live happily ever after—at least until their next quarrel.

== Cast ==
- Audrey Ferris as May, the wife
- William Collier Jr. as Ed, the husband
- Clyde Cook as Joe Babbitt
- George Beranger as Claude de Brie
- Dave Morris as Detective
- Margaret Livingston as Miss Pfeffer, the vamp

== Preservation status ==
A 35mm copy of this film survives at the Library of Congress Packard Campus for Audio-Visual Conservation in Washington, D.C., and a 16mm copy survives at the University of Wisconsin at Madison.

== See also ==
- List of early sound feature films (1926–1929)
