= Joseph Jackson (screenwriter) =

American screenwriter (1894–1932)

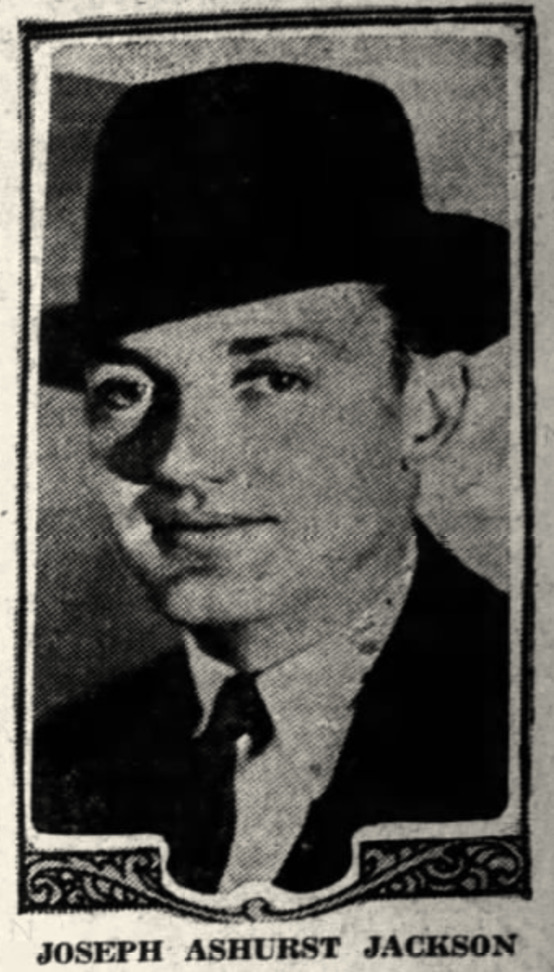
- Born: Joseph Ashurst Jackson; June 8, 1894; Winchester, Kentucky, US
- Died: May 26, 1932 (aged 37); Laguna Beach, California, US
- Occupation: screenwriter
- Years active: 1927–1932
- Spouses: Marjorie Manning (m. 1921; died 1922) Ethel Shannon (m. 1927)
- Children: 1

Joseph Ashurst Jackson (June 8, 1894 – May 26, 1932) was an American screenwriter, playwright and publicist who was nominated for the now dead category of Best Story at the 4th Academy Awards. He was nominated alongside Lucien Hubbard. They were nominated for Smart Money.

He had over 50 screenplay credits from 1927 to 1932.

== Early life and career ==
One of three children born to Frank Hoard Jackson and Florence Prewitt, Jackson was a graduate of both Kentucky Wesleyan College and Columbia University School of Journalism. He served in the United States Navy during World War I, after which he briefly served as assistant drama editor at the New York World and publicist for Goldwyn Pictures before moving to Los Angeles and Warner Brothers.

In 1923, Jackson was elected president of the Wampas, organization of the publicity and advertising men. In October 1924, he was hired as the personal representative of Rudolph Valentino, in which capacity he served for roughly one year, at which point he left to pursue his writing career in earnest. In the fall of 1925, Jackson authored one-act dramatic vehicles for Frank Keenan, Ethel Grey Terry, and Francis X. Bushman. Soon he began writing for film and for the next five years turned out screen plays for Warner Brothers First National Pictures. He wrote the script and dialogue for The Singing Fool (1928), The Terror (1928), My Man (1928), Tenderloin (1928), Those Who Dance (1930), Fifty Million Frenchmen (1931), Smart Money (1931) and scores of others.

== Personal life ==
Jackson married twice. On February 19, 1921, he married stage and aspiring screen actress Marjorie Manning; within eight months, Manning had fallen ill and, roughly eight months later, she died from that undisclosed illness on June 4, 1922. On April 27, 1927, actress Ethel Shannon and Jackson were wed at the Wilshire Boulevard Congregational Church in Los Angeles.

== Death ==
On May 26, 1932, Jackson, accompanied by actor Robert Armstrong and screenwriter Arthur Caesar, was swimming well offshore at Laguna Beach. When the trio encountered a group of barely submerged rocks about 100 feet out, all but Jackson turned back. Braving both the rocks and what would later be erroneously described as a "terrific rip tide," Jackson was approximately 200 feet from the shore when he realized he was in trouble and called back for help. After his companions again failed to surpass the 100-foot mark, an 18-year-old bystander did finally succeed in reaching him, but by then it was too late. Attempts to revive the unconscious screenwriter proved futile, and Jackson was pronounced dead, due to a combination of drowning and heart attack.

Jackson was survived by his wife Ethel and one son, Ronald Shannon Jackson.

== Selected filmography ==
- Her Big Night (1926)
- Afraid to Love (1927)
- Husbands for Rent (1927)
- If I Were Single (1927)
- The Barker (1928)
- Beware of Bachelors (1928)
- Beware of Married Men (1928)
- Caught in the Fog (1928)
- The Death Ship (1928) (short film)
- Five and Ten Cent Annie (1928)
- Land of the Silver Fox (1928)
- The Little Snob (1928)
- A Man of Peace (1928) (short film)
- The Midnight Taxi (1928)
- My Man (1928)
- Powder My Back (1928)
- The Singing Fool (1928)
- State Street Sadie (1928)
- Tenderloin (1928)
- The Terror (1928)
- Women They Talk About (1928)
- Ask Dad (1929)
- Conquest (1929)
- The Greyhound Limited (1929)
- Hardboiled Rose (1929)
- In the Headlines (1929)
- Is Everybody Happy? (1929)
- No Defense (1929)
- The Redeeming Sin (1929)
- Say It with Songs (1929)
- Second Choice (1929)
- Be Yourself! (1930)
- Dancing Sweeties (1930)
- Maybe It's Love (1930)
- Mammy (1930)
- Man to Man (1930)
- The Man from Blankley's (1930)
- Oh Sailor Behave (1930)
- The Second Floor Mystery (1930)
- Those Who Dance (1930)
- Fifty Million Frenchmen (1931)
- God's Gift to Women (1931)
- Safe in Hell (1931)
- Smart Money (1931)
- Beauty and the Boss (1932)
- The Dark Horse (1932)
- High Pressure (1932)
- The Mouthpiece (1932)
- One Way Passage (1932)
