= Empty Holsters =

1937 film by B. Reeves Eason

- Theatrical release poster
- Directed by: B. Reeves Eason
- Screenplay by: John T. Neville
- Based on: Empty Holsters; 1936 novel by Ed Earl Repp
- Produced by: Bryan Foy
- Starring: Dick Foran; Patricia Walthall; Emmett Vogan; Glenn Strange; Anderson Lawler; Wilfred Lucas
- Cinematography: Ted D. McCord
- Edited by: Clarence Kolster
- Music by: Howard Jackson
- Production company: Warner Bros. Pictures
- Distributed by: Warner Bros. Pictures
- Release date: July 10, 1937
- Running time: 62 minutes
- Country: United States
- Language: English

Empty Holsters is a 1937 American Western film directed by B. Reeves Eason and written by John T. Neville. The film stars Dick Foran, Patricia Walthall, Emmett Vogan, Glenn Strange, Anderson Lawler and Wilfred Lucas. The film was released by Warner Bros. Pictures on July 10, 1937.

== Plot ==
In the Old West, cowhands Clay Brent and Tex Roberts work for rancher Tom Raines. Raines fires Tex after mistakenly becoming the brunt of a practical joke. Clay competes with bar owner Ace Cain for the affections of Judy Ware, who has no interest in Cain. Local banker John Ware, Judy's father, turns Cain down for a loan to buy a ranch.

To get Clay out of his way, Cain and his henchmen, Cutter Smith and Buck McGovern, falsely accuse Clay of a stagecoach holdup. Cain kills the driver and the guard (one of whom is the sheriff's brother) and steals its cargo of gold coins. Cutter and Buck report Clay is responsible for the murder and robbery. Clay is convicted and sentenced to ten years in state prison. A model prisoner, Clay is paroled after five years, and returns to his old job with Raines where Clay is reunited with his horse, Smokey, who had run off. Clay reports to the sheriff who seizes his guns, telling Clay "empty holsters" is a condition of his parole.

Clay's father, who runs a saddle shop, tells Clay that Cain now owns "just about everything" in town and Tex has joined up with his gang. Clay notices that a saddle his father was making for Cain has a gold coin woven into the leather that matches the gold coins stolen from the stage robbery. Clay goes to Judy's house where he overhears an argument between Cain and Judy in which Cain threatens Judy and her father. Clay intervenes and kicks Cain out of the house; but, Cain learns of Clay's discovery of the stolen coins.

Cain returns to his office and instructs Cutter to ambush Clay. During a skirmish, Smokey attacks Cutter, who injures his arm. Cain falsely tells the sheriff that Clay provoked the fight with Cutter and that the coins in Mr. Brent's possession are evidence of Mr. Brent's complicity in the robbery. The gang contacts U.S. Marshal Billy O'Neill and falsely accuse Clay. O'Neill arrests Clay for violating his parole. Tex, disgruntled with following Cain, arrives, knocks O'Neill unconscious, and frees Clay.

Clay visits Cutter at the doctor's office and leverages Cutter's injury to force his confession that Cain committed both murders and the robbery of the gold coins. The sheriff musters a posse to find Clay. While the sheriff is away, Cain plans to steal all the money in town and skip out. Tex reports the plan to Clay who hurries to John Ware's bank. The sheriff goes to Raines' ranch searching for Clay and Tex. Tex arrives and explains to the sheriff that Clay is innocent. The sheriff's posse and Raines' hands ride off with Tex to find Cain. Cain and his gang begin their assault, starting with John Ware's bank, where Judy and her father are hiding Clay. Clay breaks cover and a gunfight ensues inside the bank. The posse arrives to subdue Cain and his men. The sheriff tells Clay he can have his guns back. Clay and Judy ride off as Clay sings "The Prairie Is My Home."

== Cast ==
- Dick Foran as Clay Brent
- Patricia Walthall as Judy Ware
- Emmett Vogan as Ace Cain
- Glenn Strange as Tex Roberts (billed as Glen Strange)
- Anderson Lawler as Buck McGovern
- Wilfred Lucas as John Ware
- Tom Brower as Dad Brent
- George Chesebro as Cutter Smith
- Charles Le Moyne as Tom Raines
- Edmund Cobb as Sheriff Cal Hardin
- J. P. McGowan as U.S. Marshal Billy O'Neill
- Milton Kibbee as Jim Hall
- Earl Dwire as Dr. J.M. 'Doc' Eagan
- Henry Otho as Charlie
