= The Little Irish Girl =

1926 film by Roy Del Ruth

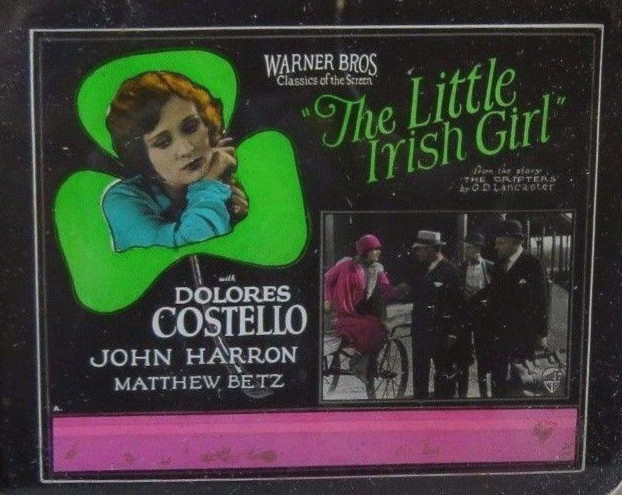
- Lantern slide
- Directed by: Roy Del Ruth
- Written by: Darryl F. Zanuck (adaptation)
- Based on: "The Grifters" by G. B. Lancaster
- Starring: Dolores Costello
- Cinematography: H. Lyman Broening; Willard Van Enger
- Edited by: Clarence Kolster
- Production company: Warner Bros.
- Distributed by: Warner Bros.
- Release date: March 6, 1926 (Limited)
- Running time: 7 reels; 6,667 feet
- Country: United States
- Language: Silent (English intertitles)

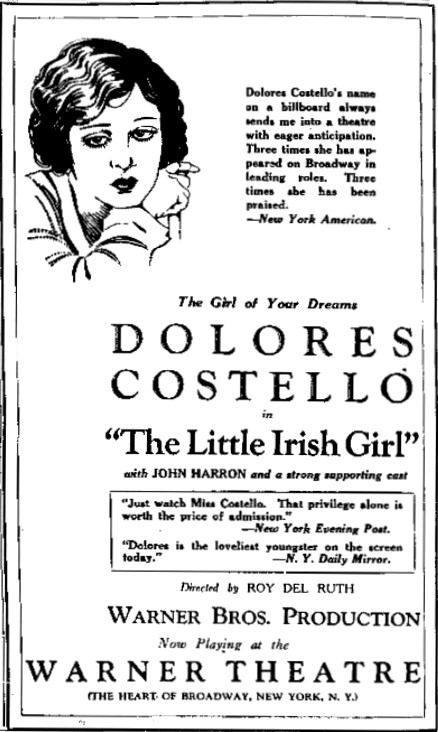
Advertisement for the film.

The Little Irish Girl is a 1926 American silent romantic drama film produced and distributed by Warner Bros., directed by Roy Del Ruth and starring Dolores Costello. It is based on the story The Grifters, written by Edith Joan Lyttleton.

== Plot ==
As described in a film magazine review, a gang of "grifters" or crooks operating in San Francisco use Dot Walker, a beautiful young Irish woman, as a "decoy" in their confidence tricks. She "lands" Johnny, grandson of an elderly woman who comes to town to try to sell a hotel and a supposedly valuable mineral water well. The gang plans to swindle the old lady out of the property, but Granny, once a crook herself, proves too clever for them and beats them at their own game. Johnny weds Dot, who reforms.

== Cast ==
- Dolores Costello as Dot Walker
- John Harron as Johnny
- Matthew Betz as Jerry Crawford
- Lee Moran as Mr. Nelson
- Gertrude Claire as Granny
- Henry A. Barrows as Bankroll Charlie
- Dot Farley as Gertie
- Joseph J. Dowling as Captain Dugan

== Preservation ==
The Little Irish Girl was considered a lost film with no copies previously known to exist. In February of 2021, the film was cited by the National Film Preservation Board on their Lost U.S. Silent Feature Films list.

However, in 2026, a complete print assembled into four 2000' reels with some decomposition was discovered in the suburbs of Sydney, Australia. The film was then donated to National Film and Sound Archive for ongoing preservation efforts.

== See also ==
- The Little French Girl (1925) starring Mary Brian
