= Divorce Among Friends =

1930 film by Roy Del Ruth

- Directed by: Roy Del Ruth
- Written by: Harvey F. Thew; Arthur Caesar from a story by Jack Townley
- Starring: James Hall; Irene Delroy; Lew Cody; Natalie Moorhead
- Cinematography: Devereaux Jennings
- Edited by: Owen Marks
- Distributed by: Warner Bros. Pictures, Inc.
- Release date: December 13, 1930 (U.S.)
- Running time: 65 minutes
- Country: United States
- Language: English

Divorce Among Friends is a 1930 American pre-Code comedy film. The film stars James Hall, Lew Cody and Natalie Moorhead. The film survives only in a 16mm copy made in the 1950s for television.

The film was based on the story "Two-Time Marriage" by Jack Townley. The story had previously been produced as a synchronized sound film (with a musical score and sound effects) in 1927 under the title of If I Were Single.

== Plot ==
George Morris constantly lies to his wife, Helen, to hide his escapades. As he is about to leave his wife, some guests arrives, including Paul Wilcox, who is in love with Helen. By the end of the party, however, George and Helen have reconciled yet again. Soon after, George meets Joan Whitley and loses a lighter which his wife has given him; Whitley drives off with it. When Helen throws a party, Joan, who is an old friend of Helen, arrives. When Helen introduces Joan to George, they pretend not to know each other. George pleads with Joan to return his lighter. She agrees to meet him later in the library and if he is nice to her she will give him back the lighter.

Helen and Paul Wilcox find the lighter and hide in the library. When George comes into the library, he thinks Joan is there and tells Helen in the dark that he likes her [Joan] but they cannot do anything right now because his wife [Helen] is suspicious and keeping a close eye on him. Helen quietly hands over the lighter. When George leaves the library, he encounters Joan who assumes he took the lighter from her purse. When the lights to the room are turned on they find Paul Wilcox in the room. Helen tells the servants that she will be sleeping in the other wing of the house. When George arrives in Helen's bedroom he finds Paul in her bed, alone. The next day, Helen sees a lawyer about getting a divorce. As she does not have concrete proof of her husband's infidelity, the lawyer advises her to make her husband walk out on her because a divorce case can only be brought for infidelity or desertion in the state where they reside. Helen goes home and does everything is her power to make George want to leave her. This eventually leads to a case of food poisoning for George, which worries Helen, who realizes how much she still loves her husband. The couple agree to get back together again. That night, Joan arrives at the house and begins talking to George. When Helen comes downstairs she sees the couple embracing and gets upset. Helen tells her husband that if he is going to go out with other women, she will go out with other men, and pretends to telephone Cody to ask him out. This leads to another argument between husband and wife. George storms out with Joan. Paul coincidentally arrives and Helen goes out with him. When George and Joan unexpectedly return to change cars (from an open sports car to a closed car as it is raining), Helen and Paul hide in the back seat under a blanket. George and Joan drive off while Helen and Paul are hidden behind them, leading to amusing complications.

== Cast ==
- James Hall as George Morris
- Irene Delroy as Helen Morris
- Lew Cody as Paul Wilcox
- Natalie Moorhead as Joan Whitley
- Edward Martindel as Tom
- Margaret Seddon as the Maid

== Songs ==
- "Maybe's It Love" hummed by James Hall
- "A Precious Little Thing Called Love"
- "Untitled Theme Song"

== Preservation ==
The film survives complete. It was transferred onto 16mm film by Associated Artists Productions in the 1950s and shown on television. A 16mm copy is housed at the Wisconsin Center for Film & Theater Research. A 35mm copy is housed at UCLA Film and Television Archives. Also a print is housed in the Library of Congress collection.
