= Only Saps Work =

1930 film

- Directed by: Cyril Gardner; Edwin H. Knopf
- Screenplay by: Owen Davis; Percy Heath; Joseph L. Mankiewicz; Sam Mintz
- Starring: Leon Errol; Richard Arlen; Mary Brian; Stuart Erwin; Anderson Lawler; Charley Grapewin; George Irving
- Cinematography: Rex Wimpy
- Edited by: Edward Dmytryk
- Production company: Paramount Pictures
- Distributed by: Paramount Pictures
- Release date: December 6, 1930
- Running time: 77 minutes
- Country: United States
- Language: English

Only Saps Work is a 1930 American pre-Code comedy film directed by Cyril Gardner and Edwin H. Knopf and written by Owen Davis, Percy Heath, Joseph L. Mankiewicz and Sam Mintz. The film stars Leon Errol, Richard Arlen, Mary Brian, Stuart Erwin, Anderson Lawler, Charley Grapewin and George Irving. The film was released on December 6, 1930, by Paramount Pictures.

== Plot ==
Only Saps Work (1930)

== Cast ==
- Leon Errol as James Wilson
- Richard Arlen as Lawrence Payne
- Mary Brian as Barbara Tanner
- Stuart Erwin as Oscar
- Anderson Lawler as Horace Baldwin
- Charley Grapewin as Simeon Tanner
- George Irving as Dr. White
- Nora Cecil as Mrs. Partridge
- Charles Giblyn as Dr. Jasper
- Fred Kelsey as Murphy
- G. Pat Collins as Rafferty
- George Chandler as Elevator Boy
- Jack Richardson as Chef
- Clarence Burton as Sergeant Burns
- Clifford Dempsey as Detective Smith
