= Accidents Will Happen (film) =

1938 film by William Clemens

- Theatrical release poster
- Directed by: William Clemens
- Screenplay by: George Bricker; Anthony Coldeway
- Story by: George Bricker
- Produced by: Bryan Foy
- Starring: Ronald Reagan; Gloria Blondell; Dick Purcell; Sheila Bromley; Addison Richards; Hugh O'Connell; Janet Shaw
- Cinematography: L. William O'Connell
- Edited by: Thomas Pratt
- Music by: Howard Jackson
- Production company: Warner Bros. Pictures
- Distributed by: Warner Bros. Pictures
- Release date: April 9, 1938
- Running time: 62 minutes
- Country: United States
- Language: English

Accidents Will Happen is a 1938 American drama film directed by William Clemens and written by George Bricker and Anthony Coldeway. The film stars Ronald Reagan, Gloria Blondell, Dick Purcell, Sheila Bromley, Addison Richards, Hugh O'Connell and Janet Shaw. The film was released by Warner Bros. Pictures on April 9, 1938.

== Plot ==
Eric Gregg is an insurance investigator whose avaricious wife Nona wants him to make more money. After he solves a case and is promised a raise, Nona is a witness in a car crash involving a claim against Eric's company. Her testimony conflicts with others at the scene. Later, Eric discovers Nona with a very expensive fur coat on credit. He learns that she paid it off with the help of Thurston, the loan company's boss, who works with a ring of criminals working to defraud insurance companies. Shortly thereafter, Eric ends up losing his job after a rival, Dawson, exposes the fraud.

Eric and a cigarette girl, Patricia Carmody, begin pulling insurance scams of their own, and they attract the attention of the other criminals, who decide to "amalgamate" their business with his. Eric begins working with the others, and is so successful that he begins to be put in charge of bigger operations. Eric tells the others in the ring that their smaller operations of $2,000 per case are insignificant next to what can do for them. He then details a large scam in which Patricia pretends to have suffered a permanent spinal injury due to a drunk driver. At the meeting to discuss the plan, he runs into Nona, who is working with Thurston. They tell Eric of their plans to be married. The incident happens as planned, and a lawsuit is filed for $25,000. At trial, while pretending to be paralyzed, Patricia suddenly stands up from her bed, shocking the courtroom, and declares that she was part of a criminal ring. Eric then takes the stand and tells the court that he was part of an undercover operation to expose all of the insurance fraud, and that he and Patricia have been working for the State's Attorney.

Nona and Thurston are arrested in the courtroom, and as Eric and Patricia embrace, Eric's old boss apologizes for firing him and gives him his old job back with a raise.

== Cast ==
- Ronald Reagan as Eric Gregg
- Gloria Blondell as Patricia Carmody
- Dick Purcell as Jim Faber
- Sheila Bromley as Nona Gregg
- Addison Richards as Blair Thurston
- Hugh O'Connell as John Oldham
- Janet Shaw as Mary Tarlton
- Elliott Sullivan as Burley Thorne
- Anderson Lawler as F.R. Dawson
- Spec O'Donnell as 'Specs' Carter
- Kenneth Harlan as Attorney Elmer Ross
- Don Barclay as Martin Dorsey
- Earl Dwire as Dr. Faris
