= Gloria Blondell =

American actress (1915–1986)

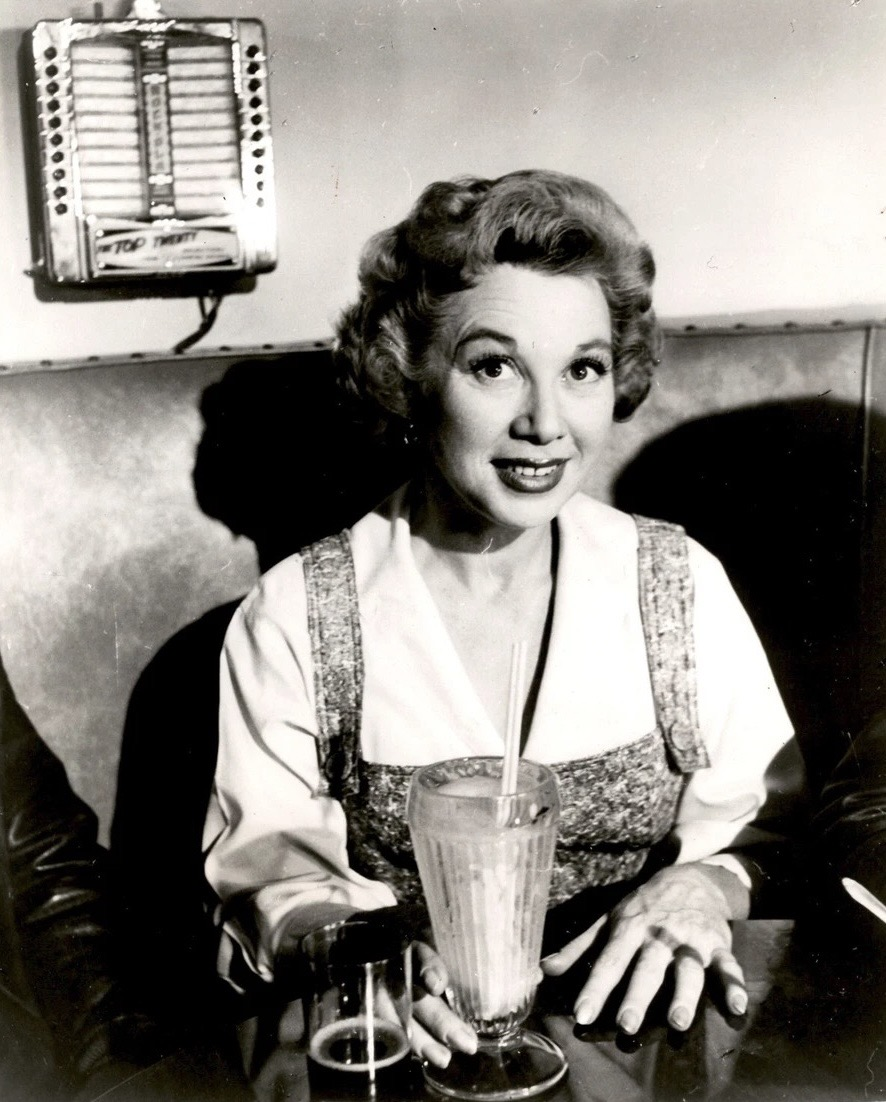
- Blondell in 1956
- Born: August 16, 1915; New York City, U.S.
- Died: March 25, 1986 (aged 70); Santa Monica, California, U.S.
- Occupation: Actress
- Years active: 1938–1962
- Spouses: Albert R. Broccoli (m. 1940; div. 1945) Victor Hunter (m. 1946; died 1980)
- Relatives: Joan Blondell (sister)

Gloria Blondell (August 16, 1915 – March 25, 1986) was an American actress who was the younger sister of actress Joan Blondell.

== Family ==
Blondell was born into a vaudeville family. Her parents and siblings, Edward Jr. and Joan, were all entertainers. She once said, "[S]ome member of my family has been in the theater ever since the time of Richard the Lionhearted." Her father, Levi Blustine (or Bluestein), a vaudeville comedian known as Ed Blondell, was born in Poland to a Jewish family circa 1865 and died in Glendale, California, on March 27, 1943. He toured for many years starring in the Blondell/Fennessy stage version of The Katzenjammer Kids. Blondell's mother, Catherine (also known as Kathryn or Katie) Caine, was born in Brooklyn, New York City, New York, on April 13, 1884, of Irish descent. She died on October 5, 1952, in Glendale, California.

== Stage ==
Gloria Blondell said that she first went on stage when she was 9 months old, and she was described as "a trouper at three [years of age]." Her family comprised a vaudeville troupe, the "Bouncing Blondells", whose members were her parents, her sister and her brother. In 1935, she appeared in the Broadway production of Three Men on a Horse at the Playhouse in New York City.

== Radio ==
Gloria Blondell was a popular featured actress during the Golden Age of Radio. Blondell had the role of secretary Jerry Booker on I Love a Mystery. Her appearances on radio include The Adventures of Philip Marlowe; Yours Truly, Johnny Dollar; Lux Radio Theatre; Arch Oboler's Plays; Richard Diamond, Private Detective; Screen Directors Playhouse, and The Great Gildersleeve.

== Film ==
Blondell co-starred with Ronald Reagan in Accidents Will Happen (1938) and with Hans Conried in The Twonky (1953). She was also in Daredevil Drivers (1938) and Three Sappy People (1939).

== Television ==
In her television performances, Blondell may be best remembered for her role as Honeybee Gillis in the 1950s sitcom starring William Bendix, The Life of Riley. She was cast in that series opposite Tom D'Andrea as her husband, Jim Gillis. She appeared in the I Love Lucy episode "The Anniversary Present" (1952) in the role of Grace Foster.

She portrayed an aging prostitute who rescues a town from a trio of criminals in "The Looters", an episode of Wanted Dead or Alive.

== Voice-over ==
For Daisy Duck's second appearance as a Disney cartoon character, she took over, marking the debut of Daisy's "normal" voice. Blondell would voice Daisy for six of her nine speaking appearances during the classic shorts era.

== Personal life ==
She married film producer Albert R. Broccoli on July 26, 1940; they divorced August 7, 1945. The following year, on September 14, she married Victor Hunter in Monterey, California. They remained married until his death in 1980, just weeks after her sister's death. Gloria and Victor had one daughter, who was born prematurely and died at birth. During the child's delivery, Gloria also nearly died from blood loss, but her life was saved by an emergency hysterectomy.

== Death ==
Blondell died at age 70 in 1986 in Santa Monica, California from cancer. Her body was cremated.

== Filmography ==
Year	Title	Role	Notes
1938	Daredevil Drivers	Lucy McAuliffe aka Lucy Mack	
1938	Accidents Will Happen	Patricia Carmody	
1938	Four's a Crowd	Lansford's 1st Secretary	
1938	Juvenile Court	Gary's Secretary	Uncredited
1938	The Spider's Web	Chase's Secretary	Serial, Uncredited
1938	The Lady Objects	Grace	Uncredited
1941	Model Wife	Gloria	Uncredited
1952	Don't Bother to Knock	Janie – Cafe Photographer	Uncredited
1953	White Lightning	Ann Garfield	
1953	The Twonky	Lady Bill Collector	
1957	God Is My Partner	Tree Critic / Wife	Uncredited
