= The Devil Diamond =

1937 film by Leslie Goodwins

- Directed by: Leslie Goodwins
- Written by: Charles R. Condon (adaptation and screenplay); Peter B. Kyne (story "Back Fire"); Sherman L. Lowe (screenplay)
- Produced by: Maurice Conn (producer)
- Starring: See below
- Cinematography: Jack Greenhalgh
- Edited by: Richard G. Wray
- Production company: Conn Pictures
- Distributed by: Conn Pictures
- Release date: January 15, 1937
- Running time: 61 minutes
- Country: United States
- Language: English

The Devil Diamond is a 1937 American film directed by Leslie Goodwins.

The film is also known as Peter B. Kyne's The Devil Diamond (American complete title), Bullets and Diamonds, and Diamonds Vs. Bullets.

== Plot summary ==
A group of thugs tries to steal the cursed title gem from a jeweler who has been hired to cut it into small, saleable pieces.

== Cast ==
- Frankie Darro as Lee
- Kane Richmond as Jerry Carter
- June Gale as Dorothy Lanning
- Rosita Butler as Yvonne Wallace
- Robert Fiske as 'Professor' John Henry Morgan, alias Moreland
- Charles Prince as Henchman Al
- Edward Earle as Arthur Stevens
- Fern Emmett as Miss Wallace
- Byron Foulger as Ole (Houseboy)
- George Cleveland as George Davis
- Burr Caruth as Peter Lanning
- Jack Ingram as Chuck—Thug
- Frank McCarroll as Henchman "Shorty"
