= Anderson Lawler =

American actor (1902–1959)

- Born: Sidney Lawler; May 5, 1902; Russellville, Alabama, United States
- Died: April 6, 1959 (aged 56); New York City, United States
- Occupations: Actor; producer
- Years active: 1929–1959

Anderson Lawler (born Sidney Lawler; May 5, 1902 – April 6, 1959) was an American actor and producer in film and theatre who had a career lasting from the 1920s through the 1950s. He began on Broadway before moving to featured and supporting roles in Hollywood over a ten-year career at the very beginning of the sound film era. After the end of his acting career, Lawler moved to the production end of the film industry as well as becoming a producer of legitimate theater in the late 1940s and 1950s.

== Early life ==
Lawler was born Sidney Lawler on May 5, 1902, in Russellville, Alabama. Prior to 1927, Lawler moved to New York City and changed his professional name to Anderson Lawler.

== Career ==
In 1927 he had a featured role in the Broadway production Her First Affaire, which premiered at the Nora Bayes Theatre in August 1927. In 1929 he moved to Los Angeles, where he began his career in the film industry. His first role was in 1929's River of Romance. While in Hollywood, he appeared in almost thirty films during this time, mostly in supporting roles, before moving behind the scenes in 1939. Aside from his professional career, he was also popular with many Hollywood actors, including William Haines, George Cukor, Gary Cooper, and Katharine Hepburn.

Lawler produced the 1946 film Somewhere in the Night, which was directed by Joseph L. Mankiewicz and starred John Hodiak, Nancy Guild, and Lloyd Nolan. Lee Strasberg adapted the screenplay and was an assistant director on the project. Shortly after this, both Lawler and Strasberg were transferred to the New York office of Twentieth Century-Fox. Lawler and Strasberg had a close friendship, Lawler becoming the godfather of Strasberg's daughter, Susan Strasberg. In New York, Lawler worked in Fox's talent department, but he also began a second career as a producer of legitimate theater. At least one of those plays, Oh Men, Oh Women, would be turned into a film by Fox in 1957.

== Personal life and death ==
Lawler was gay, although he was frequently linked with women. In 1935, he accompanied Kay Francis on a trip to Europe, ostensibly sent by the studios to keep her out of trouble. At one point, Walter Winchell started a rumor that the two were engaged.

Biographers of the actor Gary Cooper have explored his relationship with Lawler in the late 1920s. Cooper shared a house with Lawler on and off for a year, while at the same time seeing actresses Clara Bow, Evelyn Brent, and Lupe Vélez. Cooper met Lawler, a fellow Paramount Pictures contract actor, around 1929 while preparing for his starring role in The Virginian, with Lawler (a native of Alabama) helping coach Cooper's accent and introducing him to a social circle that included many other openly gay Hollywood personalities, including George Cukor and William Haines. According to Cukor biographer Patrick McGilligan, Lawler had followed Cukor from New York to Hollywood and frequently brought Cooper to Cukor's private social gatherings. The two men shared a home in Los Angeles and frequently traveled together to Catalina Island, a close bond documented in Lawler's personal scrapbooks, correspondence with his mother, and a 1929 telegram requesting a shared guest room. During this period, Cooper was simultaneously involved in a tumultuous romance with actress Lupe Vélez, who grew intensely jealous of Cooper's closeness with Lawler and reportedly told columnist Hedda Hopper that she would sniff Cooper for Lawler's cologne when he returned home. Vélez's biographer Michelle Vogel noted that Vélez ultimately tolerated Cooper's intimate dynamic with Lawler on the condition that she could participate as well. According to film historian William J. Mann and recollections from Lawler's cousin William Kizer, Paramount executives eventually pressured Cooper to move out and distance himself from Lawler in order to protect Cooper's emerging screen image as a rugged leading man, a studio-engineered split that preceded Cooper's 1931 sabbatical in Europe—though the two men later remained lifelong friends.

Lawler purchased Donald L. Linder's house in West Hollywood, California, designed in the Streamline Moderne style by architect Edward B. Rust. When he moved to New York City, he rented it to actors Orson Welles and Rita Hayworth.

On April 6, 1959, Lawler died unexpectedly from a heart attack.

== Filmography ==
(Per AFI database)

- Half Marriage (1929)
- River of Romance (1929)
- A Lady to Love (1930)
- Only Saps Work (1930)
- Girls About Town (1931)
- American Madness (1932)
- Hollywood Speaks (1932)
- Let's Fall in Love (1933)
- Ace of Aces (1933)
- The Cheyenne Kid (1933)
- Beloved (1934)
- The Man Who Reclaimed His Head (1934)
- Let's Talk It Over (1934)
- Riptide (1934)
- Public Hero No. 1 (1935)
- The Return of Sophie Lang (1936)
- The Adventurous Blonde (1937)
- Confession (1937)
- Back in Circulation (1937)
- Empty Holsters (1937)
- Fly-Away Baby (1937)
- Alcatraz Island (1937)
- Accidents Will Happen (1938)
- Heart of the North (1938)
- The Invisible Menace (1938)
- Daredevil Drivers (1938)
- Mystery House (1938)
- Over the Wall (1938)
- Torchy Blane in Chinatown (1939)
- Somewhere in the Night (1946)
