= With the Aid of Phrenology =

- Directed by: Edward Dillon
- Written by: Donald D. Garcelon
- Produced by: Biograph Company
- Starring: Charles Murray
- Distributed by: General Film Company
- Release date: September 29, 1913
- Running time: short
- Country: USA
- Language: Silent...English titles

With the Aid of Phrenology is a lost 1913 short silent film comedy directed by Edward Dillon and starring Charles Murray. It was produced by the Biograph Company and released as a split-reel with Dyed But Not Dead.

== Cast ==
- Charles Murray - The Husband
- Louise Orth - The Wife
- Dave Morris - The Strong Man
- Kathleen Butler - Suffragette
