= Daredevil Drivers =

1938 film by B. Reeves Eason

- Directed by: B. Reeves Eason
- Screenplay by: Sherman L. Lowe; Charles R. Condon
- Produced by: Bryan Foy
- Starring: Beverly Roberts; Dick Purcell; Gloria Blondell; Gordon Oliver; Charley Foy; Donald Briggs
- Cinematography: Ted D. McCord
- Edited by: Harold McLernon
- Production company: Warner Bros. Pictures
- Distributed by: Warner Bros. Pictures
- Release date: February 12, 1938
- Running time: 59 minutes
- Country: United States
- Language: English

Daredevil Drivers is a 1938 American crime film directed by B. Reeves Eason and written by Sherman L. Lowe. The film stars Beverly Roberts, Dick Purcell, Gloria Blondell, Gordon Oliver, Charley Foy and Donald Briggs. The film was released by Warner Bros. Pictures on February 12, 1938.

== Plot ==
Automobile racer Bill Foster is disqualified from a race for reckless driving, then banned from competing in the sport altogether. On the road, he then collides with a bus, owned by a company run by Jerry Neeley, a woman trying to stay in business against an aggressive rival.

Foster ends up working for Jerry's competition. A lawsuit goes against her that puts her livelihood in jeopardy. When a bus goes out of control, endangering passengers including children, Foster is able to stop it and save everyone just in time. He then joins forces with Jerry to save her company.

== Cast ==
- Beverly Roberts as Jerry Neeley
- Dick Purcell as Bill Foster
- Gloria Blondell as Lucy Mack
- Gordon Oliver as Mark Banning
- Charley Foy as 'Stub' Wilson
- Donald Briggs as Tommy Burnell
- Eric Stanley as Mr. Lane
- Ferris Taylor as Councilman Baker
- Cliff Clark as Mr. McAullife
- Earl Dwire as Mr. Perkins
- William Hopper as Neeley Bus Driver
- Fred Lawrence as Burnell Bus Driver
- Anderson Lawler as Mr. Bounty
- John Harron as Mr. Chet Maxfield
