= Men of the Sky (1931 film) =

1931 film

- Lantern slide
- Directed by: Alfred E. Green
- Screenplay by: Otto A. Harbach; Jerome Kern
- Starring: Irene Delroy; Jack Whiting; Lotti Loder; Bramwell Fletcher; Armand Kaliz; John St. Polis
- Cinematography: John F. Seitz
- Edited by: Desmond O'Brien
- Music by: Otto A. Harbach; Jerome Kern; David Mendoza; Erno Rapee
- Production companies: The Vitaphone Corp. First National Pictures
- Distributed by: Warner Bros. Pictures
- Release date: June 30, 1931
- Running time: 71 minutes
- Country: United States
- Language: English
- Budget: $462,000

Men of the Sky (aka Call of the East' and Stolen Dreams) is a 1931 all-talking American pre-Code musical drama film, directed by Albert E. Green which was produced by Warner Bros. Pictures in 1930 and released in 1931. Men of the Sky stars Irene Delroy and Jack Whiting. Although aircraft were seen in the film, Men of the Sky was more of a spy drama.

== Plot ==
In the years before World War I, a love affair takes place between an American pilot named Jack Ames and a French spy named Madeleine Aubert. Madeleine leaves her American fiancé to join her father, another French spy, at an estate in Germany. Her father instructs her to accept the invitation of a Prussian officer, Eric von Coburg, to live at his estate for a month.

Jack, believing that Madeleine no longer loves him, joins the Lafayette Escadrille, a squadron of French and American flyers. His first duty is to take a French spy, dressed as a Prussian officer, over the lines. The spy is wounded during the crossing, however, and Jack must take his place.

The French spy tells Jack that another French spy will signal him on the piano, playing a happy tune if danger threatens and sad music if the house is safe. Jack puts on the spy's uniform and arrives to find Madeleine at the piano. After Madeleine explains her mission, they continue to exchange messages.

The Germans, however, become suspicious of Madeleine and on a night Jack is set to visit, she is entertaining officers of the German intelligence. One of them asks her to play sad music. Realizing that this will place Jack in danger, she signals Jack in Morse code with her left hand. The officers discover the trick, and Jack and Madeleine are captured, accompanying her father to the firing squad.

== Cast ==
- Irene Delroy as Madeleine Aubert
- Jack Whiting as Jack Ames
- Bramwell Fletcher as Eric von Coburg
- Otto A. Harbach as French Major
- Armand Kaliz as Senor Mendoca
- Edwin Maxwell as Count
- John St. Polis as Madeleine's Father

== Production ==
The original story and music were written by Otto A. Harbach and Jerome Kern. The film was originally intended to be released, in the United States, early in 1931, but was shelved due to public apathy towards musicals. Despite waiting a number of months, the public proved obstinate and the Warner Bros. reluctantly released the film in June 1931 after making some cuts. The film was released outside the United States (since there was no backlash against musicals outside the United States) as a full musical early in 1931.

Men of the Sky was originally intended to be photographed entirely in Technicolor, but this was dropped midway into production when the studio realized due to the public backlash against musicals. The film was originally titled Call of the East but was retitled twice more before release: first to Stolen Dreams, then to Men of the Sky. Much of the music was cut and the film began to be advertised as a spy war drama. As a cost-saving measure, it was decided to release the film in black and white as color had come to be associated with musicals.

The film was to have been the first of three of musicals to be written by Otto A. Harbach and Jerome Kern for Warner Bros. Due to the public apathy for musicals, however, Warner Bros. bought out their contract and the team returned to Broadway. (Note: Harbach had a role as a French major while Kern was an extra.)

== Songs ==
- "Ev'ry Little While"
- "Cottage of Content"
- "Stolen Dreams (Who Steals All My Dreams?)"
- "All's Well with the World"
- "I'll Share them All with You (Canzonetta)"
- "Man in the Sky"
- "Suzette"
- "What's Become of Spring"
- "You've Got To Meet Marguerite"
- "Flying Field"
- "Chamber Music and Boy's March"
- "Choir"

== Reception ==
Men of the Sky was not widely released. Warner Bros. did not debut this film in the usual prestigious movie theaters. The film was immediately placed in general release with no fanfare. Very few reviewers had a chance to see the film, although Film Daily noted that there was a musical background. The surviving music does include a "conspicuous amount of music".

=== Preservation status ===
Men of the Sky is considered to be a lost film since no film elements are known to exist. The soundtrack, which was recorded on Vitaphone disks, has survived in private hands.

== See also ==
- List of lost films
