= Dave Morris (actor) =

American actor (1884–1955)

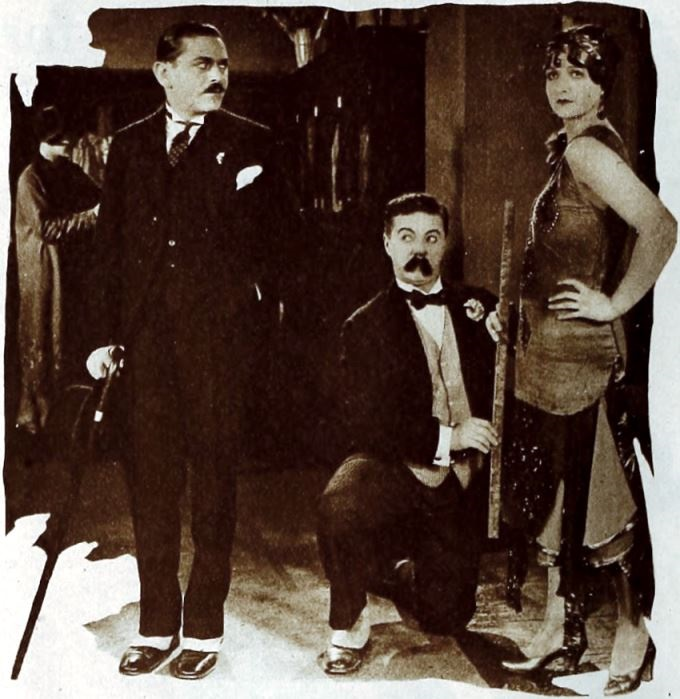
- Dave Morris, Billy Bevan, and Natalie Kingston in Fight Night (1926)
- Born: June 7, 1884; Chicago, Illinois, U.S.
- Died: November 27, 1955 (aged 71); Los Angeles, California, U.S.
- Occupation: Actor
- Years active: 1912-1949

Dave Morris (June 7, 1884 – November 27, 1955) was an American film actor of the silent era. He appeared in more than 180 films between 1912 and 1949. He was born in Chicago and died in Los Angeles.

== Partial filmography ==
- Black and White (1913)
- With the Aid of Phrenology (1913)
- Tango Tangles (1914)
- Mixed Nuts (1922)
- The Fighting Demon (1925)
- Tearing Through (1925)
- Crazy to Act (1927)
- Beware of Bachelors (1928)
- The Old Barn (1929)
- Juno and the Paycock (1930)
- Safety in Numbers (1938)
- Swamp Water (1941)
