= Powder My Back =

1928 film by Roy Del Ruth

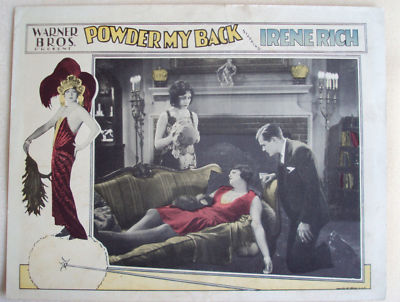
- Lobby card
- Directed by: Roy Del Ruth
- Written by: Joseph Jackson (adaptation); Robert Lord (writer); Jack Jarmuth (titles)
- Based on: story by Jerome Kingston
- Starring: Irene Rich
- Cinematography: Frank Kesson
- Edited by: Owen Marks
- Production company: Warner Bros. Pictures
- Distributed by: Warner Bros. Pictures
- Release date: March 10, 1928
- Running time: 7 reels
- Country: United States
- Languages: Sound (Synchronized) (English Intertitles)

Powder My Back is a 1928 American synchronized sound comedy film directed by Roy Del Ruth and starring Irene Rich. While the film has no audible dialog, it was released with a synchronized musical score with sound effects using the sound-on-disc Vitaphone process. The film was produced and distributed by Warner Bros.

== Plot ==
Fritzi Foy, the dazzling and independent star of the hit musical comedy Powder My Back, finds herself abruptly shut down when her show is closed by Rex Hale, a rigid moral crusader determined to clean up the stage. Outraged by his prudish interference, Fritzi vows to take revenge—not with scandal, but with wit and charm.

With the help of her ever-resourceful press agent Claude, Fritzi stages a fake automobile accident outside the reformer's home. Disguised as a doctor, Claude dramatically insists that Fritzi must not be moved from the Hale residence until she has fully recovered. Caught off guard, Hale fumes with indignation—but his son Jack Hale, a clean-cut young man with a romantic streak, is enchanted by the woman now recovering in their home.

Jack's admiration soon blossoms into love. But complications arise—Jack is already engaged to Ruth Stevens, a spirited flapper with charm and a backbone. When Ruth discovers that Jack has fallen for the glamorous actress under their very roof, she confronts Fritzi in a flash of jealous rage.

Moved by Ruth's sincerity and recognizing the unintended pain she's caused, Fritzi has a change of heart. She decides to end the ruse. Just as she prepares to leave the Hale home, she runs into Rex Hale. In a twist of irony, the stern reformer—having seen her honesty and warmth—admits that he finds her both fascinating and desirable.

Meanwhile, Jack races to Fritzi's hotel to stop her from leaving. But Fritzi, determined to cure Jack of his infatuation and honor her promise to Ruth, concocts one final theatrical trick. Using the wardrobe and props of an old-time actress, she disguises herself as a woman far older than Jack imagined. When he arrives, she greets him in this elaborate getup, letting him believe the dazzling Fritzi was merely a façade. Horrified that the woman he proposed to might be old enough to be his mother, Jack stumbles away in dismay—right into the waiting arms of Ruth, who forgives him with a smile.

Back in her room, Fritzi bursts into laughter at the success of her final performance. Her spirit and heart have not gone unnoticed. She has won the admiration—and the proposal—of Rex Hale himself. The curtain falls as Fritzi Foy prepares to take her final bow as Mrs. Rex Hale.

== Cast ==
- Irene Rich as Fritzi Foy
- Audrey Ferris as Ruth Stevens
- George Beranger as Claude
- Anders Randolf as Rex Hale
- Carroll Nye as Jack Hale

== Preservation ==
This is now a lost film.

== See also ==
- List of early sound feature films (1926–1929)
