= Oh Sailor Behave =

1930 film

Oh, Sailor, Behave!
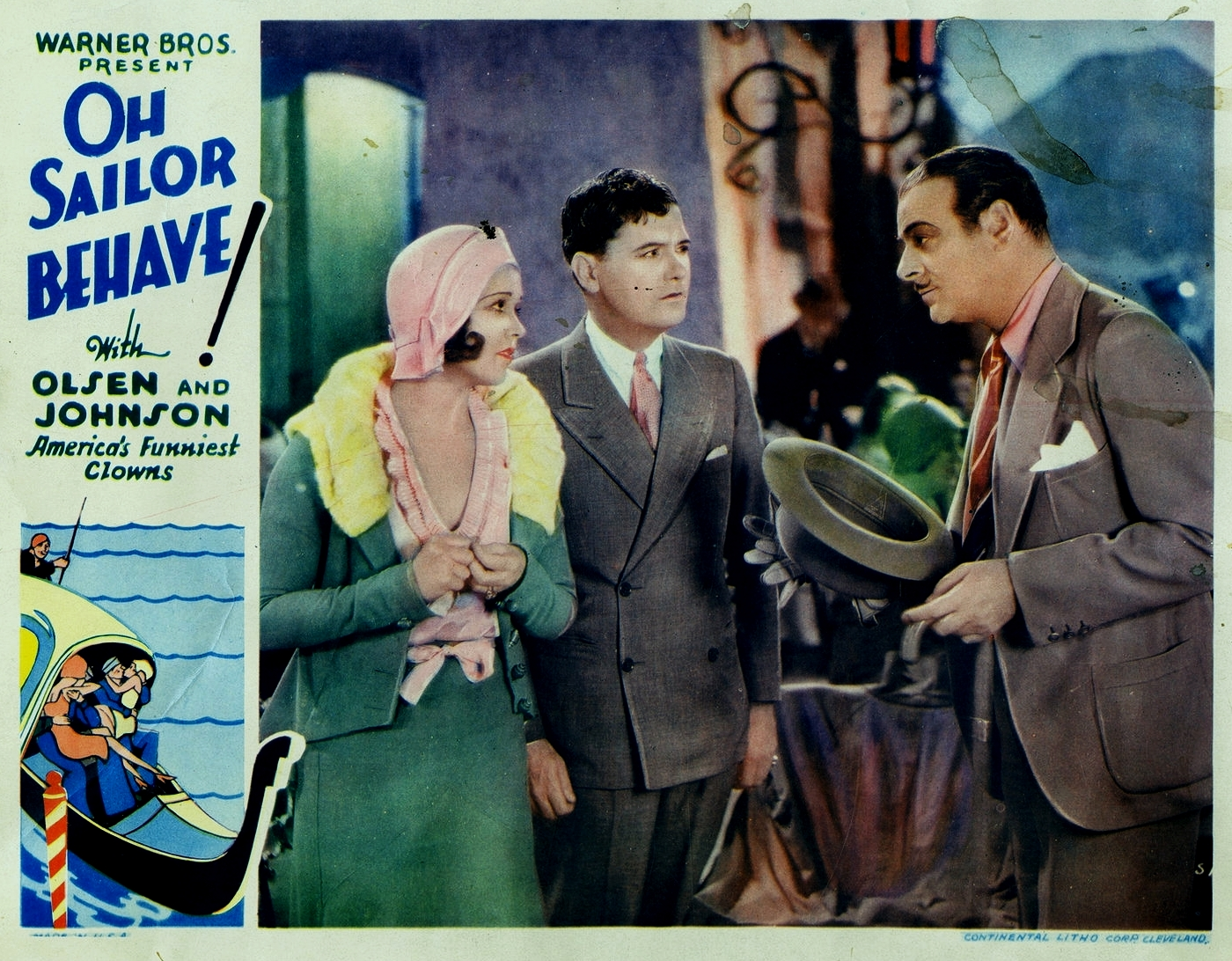
- Directed by: Archie Mayo
- Written by: Joseph Jackson; Sid Silvers from the play by Elmer Rice
- Starring: Irene Delroy; Andrew Eisnor; Charles King; Lowell Sherman; Noah Beery; Ole Olsen; Chic Johnson; Vivien Oakland; Lotti Loder
- Cinematography: Devereaux Jennings
- Edited by: William Holmes
- Music by: Joseph Burke; Al Dubin; Leonid S. Leonardi; David Mendoza
- Distributed by: Warner Bros. Pictures, Inc.
- Release date: August 16, 1930
- Running time: 70 minutes
- Country: United States
- Language: English

Oh, Sailor, Behave! is a 1930 American pre-Code musical comedy film produced and released by Warner Bros. Pictures, and based on the play See Naples and Die, written by Elmer Rice. The film was originally intended to be entirely in Technicolor and was advertised as such in movie trade journals. Due to the backlash against musicals, it was apparently released in black-and-white only.

== Plot ==
Oh, Sailor Behave! (1930)

An American newspaper reporter named Charlie Carroll is sent to Venice to interview a Romanian general, who is played by Noah Beery. While in Venice Charlie falls for a young heiress named Nanette Dodge. When Charlie is unable to get an interview with the Romanian general, a local siren named Kunegundi, who is the general's favorite helps him. Meanwhile, Nanette learns that her sister is being blackmailed by Prince Kasloff of Russia, to whom she wrote some incriminating letters. Nanette attempts to vamp the Prince in order to obtain the love letters. The Prince, however, tricks her and demands that Nanette marry him if she wants to save her sister. After being repeatedly rebuked by Nanette, the prince hires the Romanian general to kidnap her and force her into marriage. Charlie, thinking she has eloped, consoles himself with Kunegundi and almost marries her until he realizes the truth about Nanette and that she has been kidnapped by the Prince. Charlie sets out to rescue her and when the Prince shows up disguised as the general he shoots Prince Kasloff. Charlie and Nanette are happily reunited.

Two American sailors stationed in Naples who attempt to find a wooden-legged thief who has robbed the navy storehouse in Venice. Louisa, a local siren leads them on and embroils them in trouble.

== Music ==
- "When Love Comes In The Moonlight"
- "Leave A Little Smile"
- "Highway to Heaven"
- "The Laughing Song"
- "Tell Us Which One Do You Love"

== Production background ==
- Charles King recorded three songs for the film for Brunswick Records: Brunswick 4840 (Highway to Heaven/When Love Comes in the Moonlight); Brunswick 4849 (Leave A Little Smile). The other side of Brunswick 4849 featured a song from the aborted MGM revue The March of Time (1930).
- This was to be Charles King's last musical movie. He went back to the Broadway stage, since movie audiences had grown tired of musicals, and never returned to the screen.
- Due to the public apathy towards musicals, Warner Bros. did not debut this film in the usual prestigious movie theaters. The film was immediately placed in general release with no fanfare.
- Comedians Olsen and Johnson were added to the film due to growing public apathy towards serious stage actors such as King and Delroy. The movie was marketed as a comedy film with these comics billed as "America's funniest clowns".

== Preservation ==
The version of the film released in the United States, late in 1930, survives intact. A print is at the Museum of Modern Art, and is in the Turner Classic Movies film library as well as the Library of Congress. The complete soundtrack also survives on Vitaphone disks. The film was released on DVD through the Warner Archive Collection in 2014.
