= Caught in the Fog =

1928 film

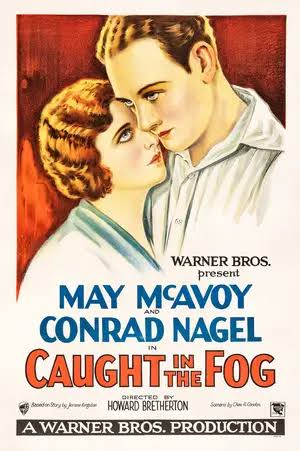
- Theatrical release poster
- Directed by: Howard Bretherton
- Written by: Charles R. Condon; Joseph Jackson (titles)
- Story by: Jerome Kingston
- Starring: May McAvoy; Conrad Nagel; Mack Swain
- Cinematography: Byron Haskin
- Edited by: Ralph Dawson
- Production company: Warner Bros. Pictures
- Distributed by: Warner Bros. Pictures
- Release date: August 25, 1928
- Running time: 70 minutes
- Country: United States
- Languages: Sound (Part-Talkie); English Intertitles
- Budget: $92,000
- Box office: $416,000

Caught in the Fog is a 1928 American sound part-talkie thriller film directed by Howard Bretherton and written by Charles R. Condon and Joseph Jackson. In addition to sequences with audible dialogue or talking sequences, the film features a synchronized musical score and sound effects along with English intertitles. According to the film review in Variety, between twenty and twenty-four minutes of the total running time (divided into four separate talking sequences) featured dialogue. The soundtrack was recorded using the Vitaphone sound-on-disc system. The film stars May McAvoy, Conrad Nagel and Mack Swain, and features Hugh Herbert, Charles K. Gerrard and Émile Chautard. The film was released by Warner Bros. Pictures on August 25, 1928.

== Plot ==
Bob Vickers, a young society scion, arrives unexpectedly at his family's houseboat off the Florida coast to retrieve his mother's jewelry—only to walk straight into a heist in progress. Inside, he surprises a bobbed-hair bandit and her slick gunman accomplice, a self-styled “sheik”, as they attempt to crack the safe.

Mistaken for a rival thief, Bob is pulled into a tense standoff. A scuffle breaks out in the dark over the jewels, but it's suddenly interrupted by the arrival of an elderly couple—an apparently genteel man and woman—who claim to be old friends of the Vickers family. In truth, they're seasoned crooks with their own plans to loot the boat.

With a fog rolling in and the mainland cut off, Bob chooses to conceal his true identity. He poses as the houseboat's butler, watching warily as the bobbed-hair bandit and her partner bluff their way into staying by posing as the maid and cook.

Soon after, two bumbling detectives, Riley and Ryan, show up to investigate a tip. Their arrival only heightens the chaos. Hysterical and completely unprepared, the pair are convinced that the houseboat is haunted when “ghostly” figures appear and vanish in the mist. Their antics prove useless in the escalating danger as gunfire erupts in the dark and alliances shift among the thieves, each double-crossing the other to claim the jewels for themselves.

In the midst of the mayhem, Bob manages to rescue the girl from her domineering “sheik” partner, and a bond forms between them. As the long night drags on, harbor police arrive just in time to launch a dramatic roundup, capturing every crook on board—except one.

Hidden away in a quiet corner of the houseboat, Bob gently arrests the bobbed-hair bandit himself, but as he takes her hand, it's clear that something else has been stolen that night—his heart.

== Cast ==
- May McAvoy as The Girl
- Conrad Nagel as Bob Vickers
- Mack Swain as Detective Ryan
- Hugh Herbert as Detective Riley
- Charles K. Gerrard as Crook
- Émile Chautard as The Old Man
- Ruth Cherrington as The Old Woman

== Box office ==
According to Warner Bros records the film earned $355,000 domestically and $61,000 internationally.

== Preservation ==
An incomplete 35mm copy of this film survives at the British Film Institute's National Film and Television Archive.

== See also ==
- List of early sound feature films (1926–1929)
