= The Old Barn =

1929 film

- The Film
- Directed by: Mack Sennett
- Written by: Hampton Del Ruth (writer); Alfred M. Loewenthal (writer); Andrew Rice (writer); Earle Rodney (writer); John A. Waldron (story supervisor)
- Produced by: Mack Sennett
- Cinematography: John W. Boyle; Ernie Crockett; George Unholz
- Edited by: William Hornbeck
- Distributed by: Educational Film Exchanges, Inc.
- Release date: February 16, 1929
- Running time: 20 minutes
- Country: United States
- Language: English

The Old Barn is a 1929 American comedy film directed by Mack Sennett.

== Plot ==
A motley collection of guests and regulars at a country hotel are anxious one dark and stormy night when they hear by a radio news bulletin that a dangerous criminal has just broken jail and is headed their way. A surly mystery man answering the description shows up and then hides out in a nearby barn.

== Cast ==
- Johnny Burke
- Thelma Hill
- Daphne Pollard
- Andy Clyde
- Irving Bacon
- Vernon Dent
- Dave Morris
- Ruth Kane
