= Irene Delroy =

American stage actress (1900–1985)

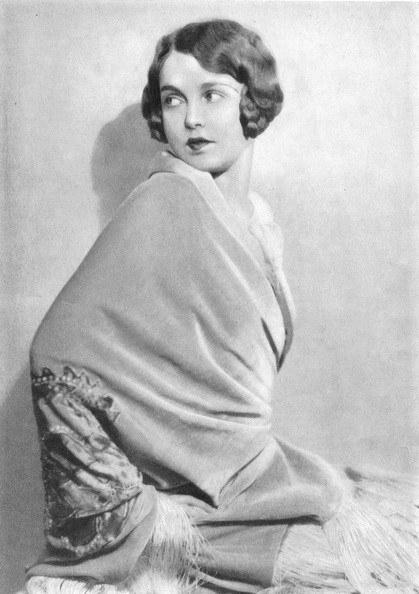
- Born: Josephine Lucille Sanders; July 21, 1900; Bloomington, Illinois, U.S.
- Died: June 14, 1985 (aged 84); Ithaca, New York, U.S.
- Occupation: Actress
- Spouse(s): W. L. Austin, Jr. (m. 1921; div. 1937)

Josephine Lucille Sanders (July 21, 1900 – June 14, 1985), known by her stage name Irene Delroy, was an American stage actress.

== Early years ==
Born Josephine Lucille Sanders, Delroy was the daughter of Mr. and Mrs. Roy Sanders of Bloomington, Illinois. She attended Bloomington High School and University High School.

== Career ==
Delroy's stage debut came when she appeared as a ballet dancer with the Chicago Opera Company. During a visit of that company to New York City in 1920, she left the group to join a fledgling production, A Night Off, in Plainfield, New Jersey. Two weeks after the debut, the inexperienced producers left to return to their former jobs. Delroy returned to Chicago and joined a production of Angel Face, which soon ended during a strike by the Actors' Equity Association.

She made her Broadway debut in the musical revue Frivolities of 1920. She starred in the Greenwich Village Follies from 1923 through 1926 and the Ziegfeld Follies of 1927. She also had leading roles in the musicals Round the Town (1924), Here's Howe (1928), Follow Thru (1929), and Top Speed (1929-1930).

A review of Greenwich Village Follies published in The New York Times on December 25, 1925, noted that Delroy was "radiantly beautiful and sweetly graceful and tuneful" in the production.

Hans J. Wollstein, writing on the AllMovie website, described Delroy as being "completely wasted by the new audible motion picture industry in 1930." She appeared in Oh, Sailor, Behave! (1930), The Life of the Party (1930), and Men of the Sky (1931).

== Personal life ==
Delroy retired from the entertainment business after marrying W. L. Austin, Jr. on July 15, 1931. He was president of Island Park Associates, Inc., the company that operated Atlantic Beach and part of Rockaway Point. While they were on their honeymoon in Murray Bay, Quebec, Canada, she fell from a horse. Her injuries included "a slight fracture of the skull and slight concussion; a double fracture of a finger, and dislocation of one of the bones about the hip." They were divorced on July 1, 1937.

== Stage ==
Broadway:

- Frivolities of 1920 (Jan 08, 1920 - Feb 28, 1920)
- The Greenwich Village Follies (Sep 20, 1923 - Jan 1924)
- Vogues of 1924 (Mar 27, 1924 - Jul 12, 1924)
- Round the Town (May 21, 1924 - May 31, 1924)
- The Greenwich Village Follies (Dec 24, 1925 - May 29, 1926)
- Ziegfeld Follies (Aug 16, 1927 - Jan 07, 1928)
- Here's Howe (May 01, 1928 - Jun 30, 1928)
- Follow Thru (Jan 09, 1929 - Dec 21, 1929)
- Top Speed (Dec 25, 1929 - Mar 22, 1930)

== Filmography ==
- The Inside of the Cup (1921)
- The Life of the Party (1930)
- Oh Sailor Behave (1930)
- Divorce Among Friends (1930)
- Men of the Sky (1931)
- Sound Defects (1937, short)

== Sources ==
- David L. Lightner. Winnie Lightner: Tomboy of the Talkies. University Press of Mississippi, 2016.
- Paul Rayburn and Denise Sampson. Josephine Lucille Sanders “Irene Delroy” Collection. McLean County Museum of History. 2009.
