= Second Choice =

1930 film

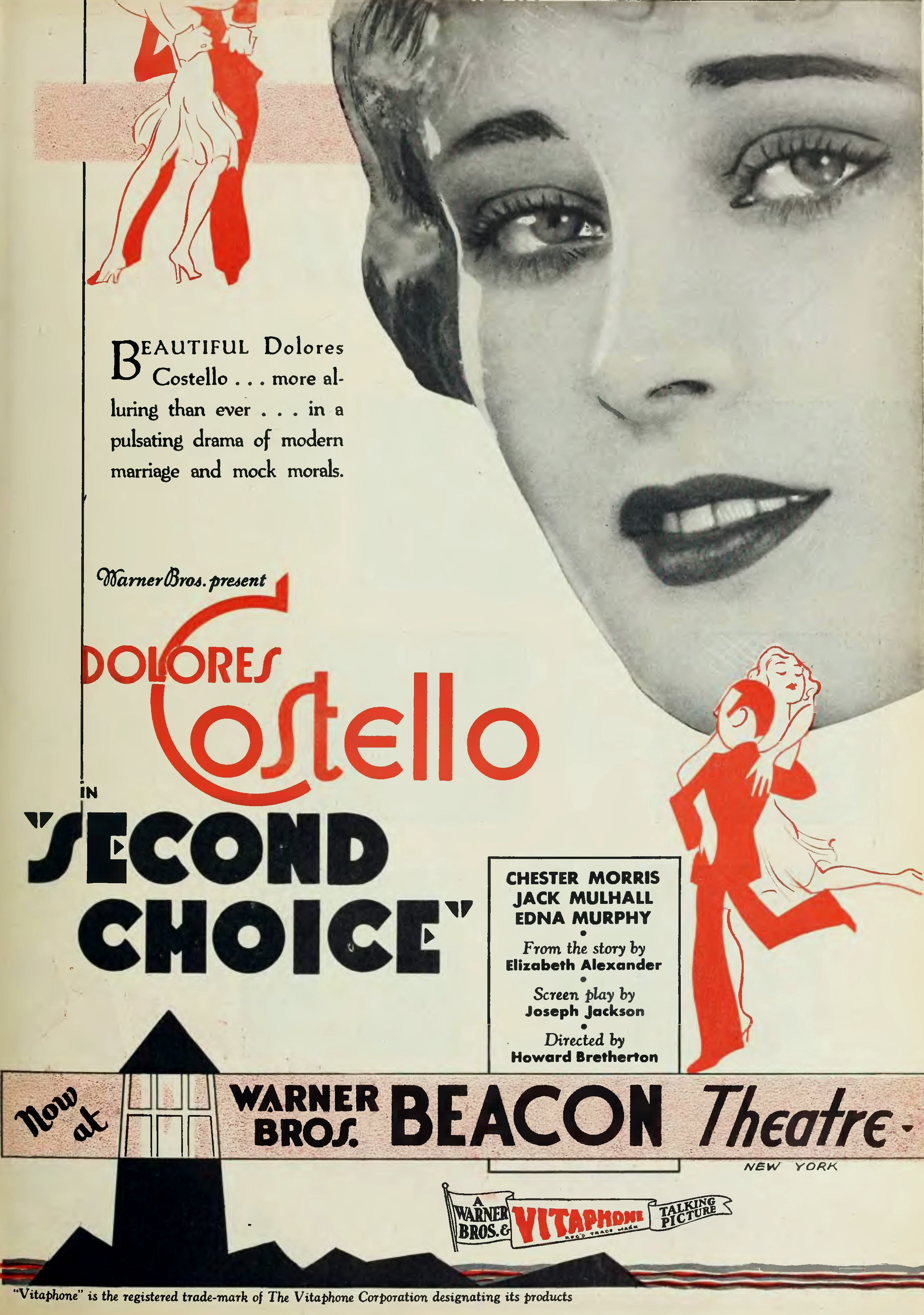
- Advertisement in Motion Picture News
- Directed by: Howard Bretherton
- Written by: Joseph Jackson
- Based on: Elizabeth Alexander (novel)
- Starring: Dolores Costello; Chester Morris
- Cinematography: John Stumar
- Edited by: Robert O. Crandell
- Production company: Warner Bros. Pictures
- Distributed by: Warner Bros. Pictures
- Release date: January 4, 1930
- Running time: 67 minutes
- Country: United States
- Language: English

Second Choice is a 1930 American pre-Code romantic drama film released by Warner Bros. Pictures and starring Dolores Costello and Chester Morris. The film is notable as being the first (and only film) in which Dolores Costello sang. It is a lost film. The film was based on the story by Elizabeth Alexander and was adapted for the screen by Joseph Jackson.

== Plot ==
Vallery Grove is in love with Don Warren, but her mother opposes the match because he is poor and has no social standing. Don decides to terminate his engagement to Vallery after attending a party where he meets a spoiled rich girl who is interested in him.

Dolores is later introduced to Owen Mallory who informs her that Don is now planning to marry the spoiled rich girl. Mallory, who has himself been recently jilted, and Vallery find comfort in each other and eventually Owen proposes to Vallery. She finally accepts, and they elope.

Once she is married, Vallery discovers that Don has broken off his engagement. She becomes uncertain about her love for Mallory and while her husband is away on business, she invites Don, who is drunk, into her house.

== Cast ==
- Dolores Costello as Vallery Grove
- Chester Morris as Don Warren
- Jack Mulhall as Mallory
- Edna Murphy as Beth Randall
- Ethlyne Clair as Edith Pemberton
- Charlotte Merriam as Satterlee
- James Clemens as Ned Pemberton
- Edward Martindel as Herbert Satterlee
- Henry Stockbridge as Mr. Grove
- Anna Chance as Mrs. Grove
- Louise Beavers as Maid (uncredited)
- Louise Lester - Bit Role (uncredited)

== Music ==
The theme song was called "Life Can Be So Lonesome" and was sung by Dolores Costello in the picture. It was composed by Al Dubin, Joe Burke and M.K Jerome. The theme song was recorded by Debroy Somers for Columbia and released as part of series of recordings known as "Talkie Tunes Medley".

== Reception ==
The New York Times wrote that the director held audiences' attention but said of the film's cast, "Jack Mulhall is miscast as Mallory and gives a halting performance. Miss Costello moves slowly and speaks the pseudo-smart lines with uncertainty. Chester Morris grimmaces as usual and never forgets he is the 'heavy,' and neither does the onlooker." Pittsburgh Press wrote, "When it doesn't try to take itself too seriously, 'Second Choice' ... is what is known in film trade circle as a fairly good 'program' picture." The newspaper said that some dialogue was sometimes "ridiculous" and sometimes "fairly credible". It complained, "If 'Second Choice' had been made as a straight comedy it would have been a much better picture. The combination of comedy, drama and a tinge of melodrama was a little too much for it to swallow."

== Preservation status ==
Second Choice is now considered a lost film. No prints are known to exist.

== See also ==
- List of lost films
