= Headline Crasher =

1936 film directed by Leslie Goodwins

- Directed by: Leslie Goodwins
- Screenplay by: Sherman L. Lowe; Charles R. Condon
- Story by: Harry O. Hoyt; Charles R. Condon
- Based on: the short story, "A Motion to Adjourn" by Peter B. Kyne
- Produced by: Maurice Conn
- Starring: Frankie Darro; Kane Richmond; Muriel Evans
- Cinematography: Gilbert Warrenton
- Edited by: Martin G. Cohn
- Production company: Conn Pictures
- Release date: December 25, 1936 (US)
- Running time: 58 minutes
- Country: United States
- Language: English

Headline Crasher is a 1936 American drama film directed by Leslie Goodwins from a screenplay by Sherman L. Lowe and Charles R. Condon. The film stars Frankie Darro, Kane Richmond, and Muriel Evans.

== Cast ==
- Frankie Darro as Jimmy Tallant
- Kane Richmond as Larry Deering
- Muriel Evans as Edith Arlen
- Richard Tucker as Senator Tallant
- John Merton as Tony Scarlotti
- Eleanor Stewart as Helen
- Edward Earle as Atwood
- Harry Harvey, Sr. as Harry Harvey
- John Ward as Campaign manager
- Jack Ingram as Al
