= Land of the Silver Fox =

1928 film

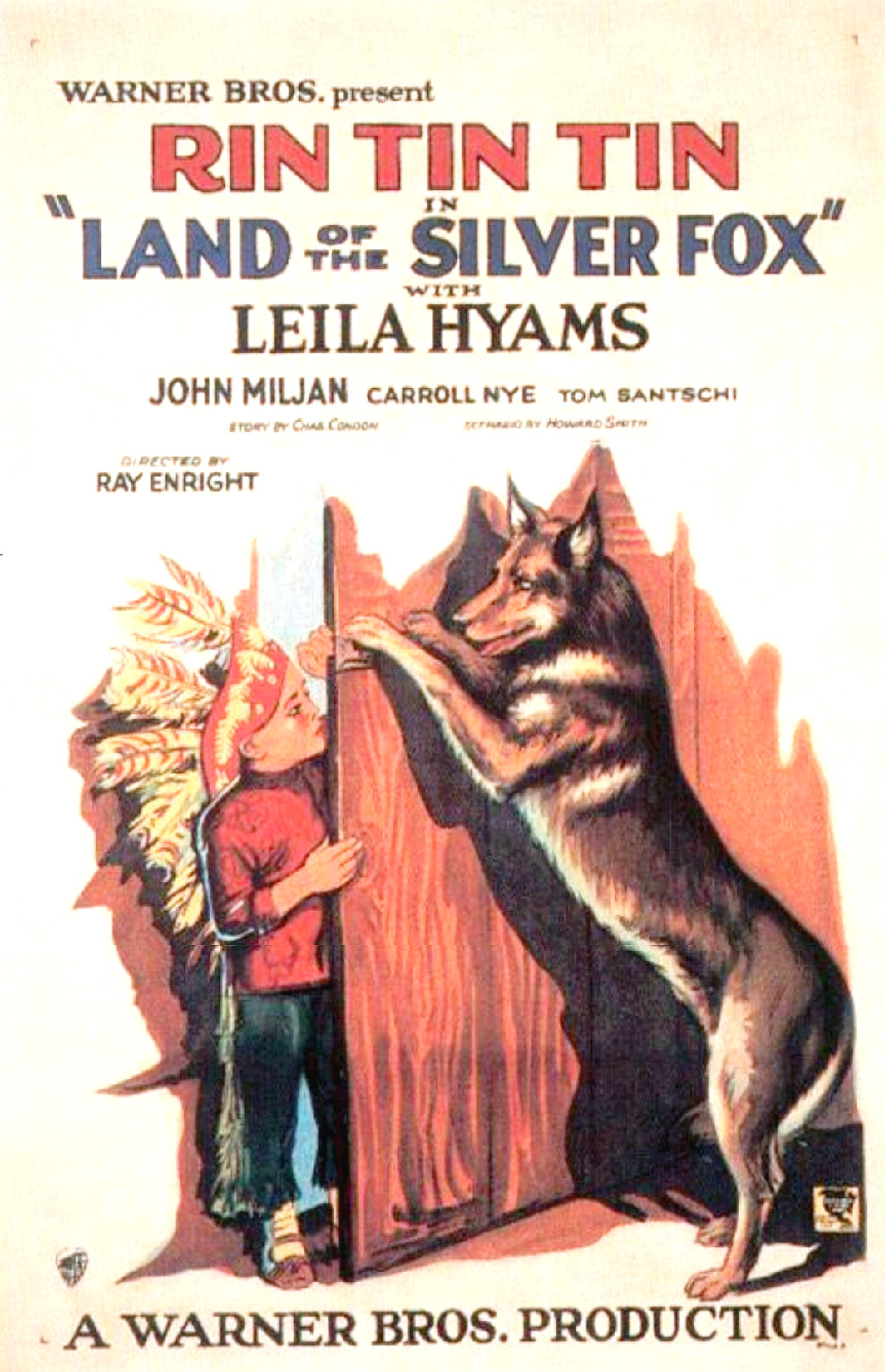
- Theatrical release poster
- Directed by: Ray Enright
- Written by: Howard Smith (scenario & dialogue); Joseph Jackson (titles)
- Story by: Charles R. Condon
- Starring: Rin Tin Tin; Leila Hyams
- Cinematography: Frank Kesson
- Edited by: Owen Marks
- Production company: Warner Bros. Pictures
- Distributed by: Warner Bros. Pictures
- Release date: October 18, 1928 (US)
- Running time: 60 minutes (7 Reels)
- Country: United States
- Language: Sound (Part-Talkie) (English Intertitles)

Land of the Silver Fox is a 1928 American sound part-talkie adventure film directed by Ray Enright and written by Howard Smith and Joseph Jackson. In addition to sequences with audible dialogue or talking sequences, the film features a synchronized musical score and sound effects along with English intertitles. The soundtrack was recorded using the Vitaphone sound-on-disc system. The film stars Rin Tin Tin, Leila Hyams, John Miljan, Carroll Nye, Tom Santschi, and Neola May. The film was released by Warner Bros. Pictures on October 18, 1928.

== Plot ==
In the frozen reaches of the far North—a land where might often makes right and the law is easily outlawed—Carroll Blackton purchases the courageous Rinty from a cruel bully. The transaction empties his savings and delays his long-anticipated marriage to Marie du Fronque, a pure-hearted orphan of the snow country. Marie has been raised in the custody of James Crawford, a smooth-faced villain hiding dark designs on his young ward. In this harsh land where Get-Your-Woman impulses clash with Get-Your-Man justice, danger lies just beneath the snowy surface.

Intent on eliminating his rival and protecting his secret stake in a vast fur smuggling operation, Crawford sends Carroll out on a grueling expedition with a sled-load of furs. He secretly hires the brutal Butch Nelson to ambush, rob, and murder Carroll before he can return. But this life-and-death struggle under the northern stars is no match for canine heroism: Rinty, using clever strategy and unshakable loyalty, thwarts the plot. Butch flees, telling Crawford the job is done. Marie is left to mourn Carroll, believing him dead.

But Carroll, gravely wounded yet alive, fights his way back—furs intact. Crawford, threatened by Carroll's reappearance, extracts three pelts from the shipment and accuses Carroll of theft just as the Mounted Police arrive. In this riot of incredible romance and betrayal, Carroll is hauled away in shame, and Marie is left unprotected and at the mercy of Crawford's brutal will.

Now Rinty's fight truly begins. Battling furiously with Butch Nelson in a climactic confrontation, the good dog triumphs over the bad man. His furious assault drives Butch to confess, exposing the villainous plot. Human cunning is outmatched by canine humanity, and Crawford is brought to justice.

With the truth laid bare, Carroll is freed. Rinty, having weathered runs, battles, and surprises in a world of bad men and bold spirits, becomes both matchmaker and hero. Carroll and Marie are reunited and their romance is redeemed. Rinty takes for himself a wild-hearted mate named Nanette, a fierce and beautiful wolf dog he encountered in the wilderness.

== Cast ==
- Rin Tin Tin as Rinty
- Leila Hyams as Marie du Fronque
- John Miljan as James Crawford
- Carroll Nye as Carroll Blackton
- Tom Santschi as Butch Nelson
- Neola May as The Squaw
- Nanette the Dog as Nanette

== Preservation ==
A print of Land of the Silver Fox is held by the George Eastman Museum.

== See also ==
- List of early sound feature films (1926–1929)
- List of early Warner Bros. sound and talking features
