= Edward B. Rust =

- Born: May 8, 1883; South Pasadena, California, U.S.
- Died: September 27, 1958 (aged 75); Los Angeles County, California, U.S.
- Resting place: Resurrection Cemetery, Montebello, California, U.S.
- Education: Stanford University; University of California, Berkeley
- Occupation: Architect
- Spouses: Constance Maclintock; Veronica F. Rust
- Children: 1 son, 1 daughter

Edward B. Rust (May 8, 1883 - September 27, 1958) was an American architect who designed many buildings in Los Angeles, California.

== Early life ==
Rust was born on a farm in South Pasadena, California, on May 8, 1883. He attended Stanford University from 1902 to 1905 and the University of California, Berkeley from 1906 to 1908.

== Career ==
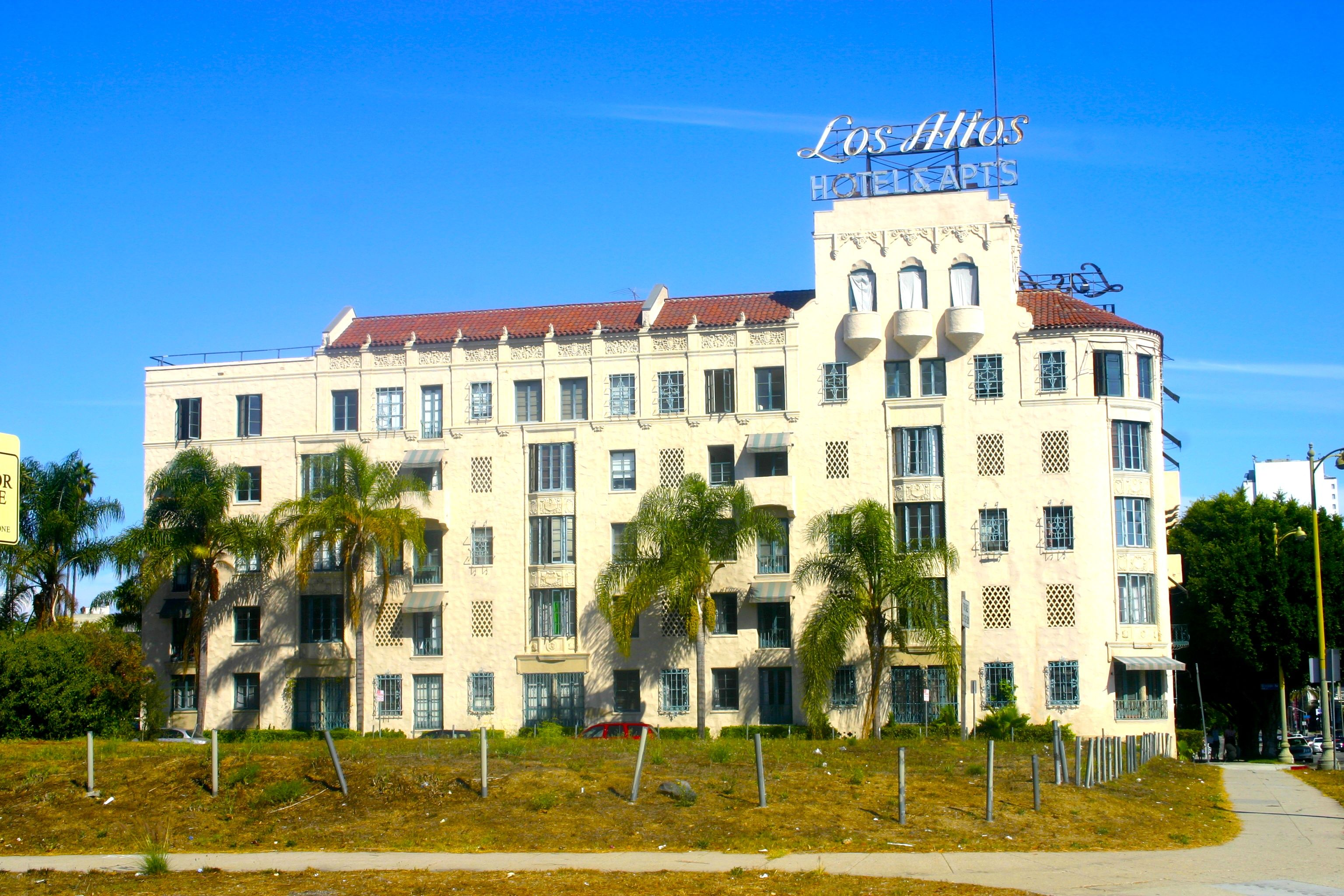
Los Altos Apartments

Rust worked as a secretary at Ye Planry Building Company before starting his own architectural firm in 1913. His early work was mostly craftsman-styled single family houses and bungalows.

Starting in the 1920s, Rust began designing larger projects including (all in Los Angeles):

- Roberta Apartments (1921)
- Security Trust and Savings branch at Figueroa Street and Adams Boulevard (1925)
- Los Altos Apartments (1925), NRHP listed
- Edwards and Wildey Building
- Fleur de Lis Apartments
- William Penn Hotel

Furthermore, several of Rust's 1920s works have been listed as contributing properties in the National Register of Historic Places, including:

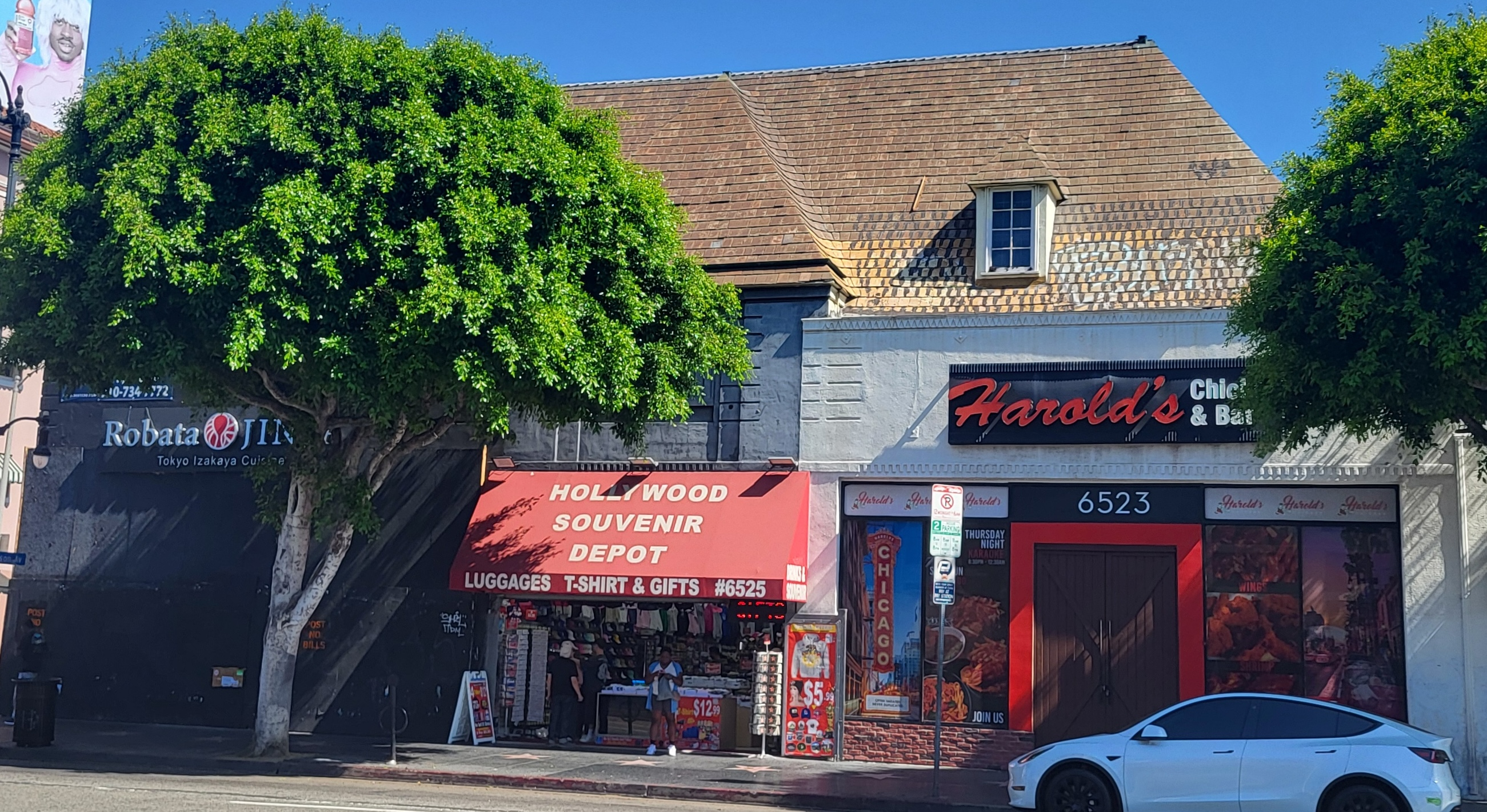
Holly Cinema

- Holly Cinema (1920), part of the Hollywood Boulevard Commercial and Entertainment District
- Town House Apartments (1926), "The Maryland" part of the Pasadena Civic Center District
- Apartment building at 614 South St. Andrews Place, part of the Westminster Place Historic District

In 1938, Rust designed a Streamline Moderne-styled house for Donald L. Linder in West Hollywood. The house was subsequently purchased by Anderson Lawler, who rented it to Orson Welles and Rita Hayworth.

Rust also designed the Van de Kamp's Holland Dutch Bakeries windmill. By the time of his death, he was described by the Los Angeles Times as "a widely known architect."

== Personal life and death ==
Rust was married twice. With his first wife, nee Constance Maclintock, he had a son, and he had a daughter with his second wife, Veronica. They resided in San Gabriel, California.

Rust died on September 27, 1958, in Los Angeles County, California. His funeral was held at the St. Therese Roman Catholic Church in Alhambra, and he was buried at the Resurrection Cemetery in Montello.
