= If I Were Single =

1927 film by Roy Del Ruth

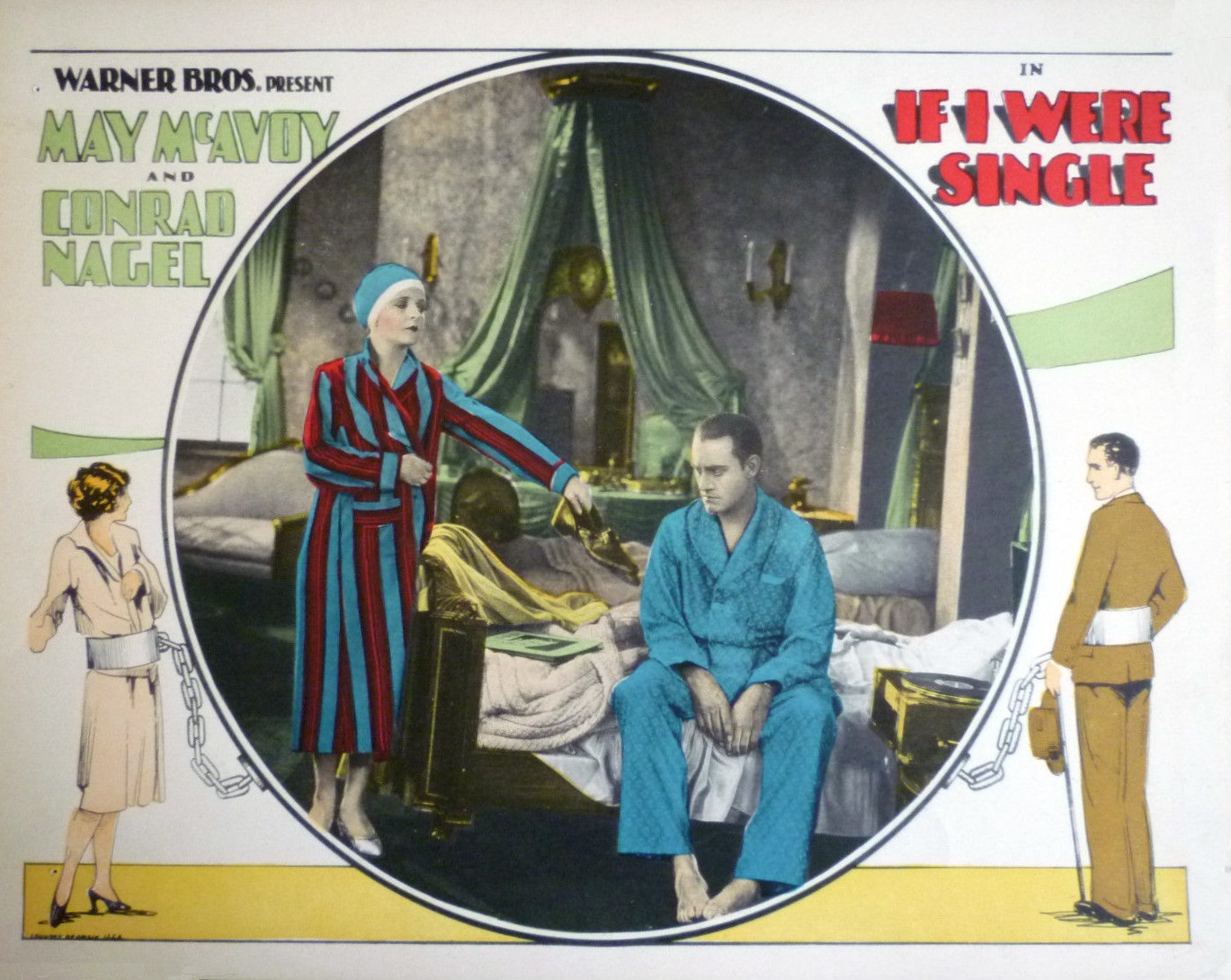
- Lobby card
- Directed by: Roy Del Ruth
- Written by: Robert Lord; Joseph Jackson
- Produced by: Darryl F. Zanuck
- Starring: May McAvoy; Conrad Nagel; Myrna Loy
- Cinematography: Edwin B. DuPar
- Edited by: Ralph Dawson
- Production company: Warner Bros.
- Distributed by: Warner Bros.
- Release date: December 17, 1927
- Running time: 70 minutes
- Country: United States
- Languages: Sound (Synchronized) (English intertitles)

If I Were Single is a 1927 American synchronized sound comedy film directed by Roy Del Ruth and starring May McAvoy, Conrad Nagel, and Myrna Loy. While the film has no audible dialog, it was released with a synchronized musical score with sound effects using the Vitaphone sound-on-disc process.

The film was based on the story "Two-Time Marriage" by Jack Townley. The story was adapted into an All-Talking sound film in 1930 under the title of Divorce Among Friends by Warner Bros.

== Plot ==
After a year of marriage, Ted Howard and his wife May have come to the shared conclusion that marriage would be a wonderful institution - if only it weren't for husbands and wives. Though Ted is still fond of his wife, his roving eye leads him to a stranger he meets en route to the golf course. He forgets to retrieve a distinctive cigarette lighter - a gift from May - which he had loaned her.

That same evening, May announces that an old college friend is coming to dinner. Ted is stunned when the mystery woman turns out to be Joan Whitley, the very woman he flirted with that morning. Joan instantly recognizes Ted as well—and sizing up the situation, she decides to have a little fun at the couple's expense. The missing cigarette lighter quickly becomes the catalyst for Ted and May's first serious argument.

Although the tension soon smooths over, Joan isn't done with her game of seduction, continuing to pursue Ted playfully but persistently. In response, and not to be outdone, May decides to make her husband jealous by flirting with her handsome but timid music teacher, Claude. Claude is far from bold, especially after noting Ted's athletic build, but May insists they go for a drive together in her limousine.

Unbeknownst to them, Joan has convinced Ted to take her for a drive that same night. When the two couples cross paths in the garage, Claude, panicked, urges May to hide in the back seat. Oblivious to the stowaways, Ted climbs into the front with Joan, and off they go—with May and Claude secretly crouched in the back.

The ride takes a comic turn when the car breaks down. Ted goes to retrieve tools—stored in the back—forcing May and Claude to desperately keep the door shut. Just then, a pair of armed robbers hold up the group. The surprise reveal that May and Claude were in the car all along shocks Ted so much that he momentarily forgets the robbery, turning his attention instead to scolding his wife. While the couple quarrel in the pouring rain, the robbers make off with the car.

Claude and Joan, eager to avoid further scandal, slink away together, leaving the bickering husband and wife stranded on a country road in a downpour. Exhausted, wet, and humbled, May and Ted trudge along in silence until a kindly milkman offers them a ride home.

Huddled together in the milk wagon, May softens and leans against Ted's comforting shoulder. Once home, both agree they've had enough romantic misadventures to last a lifetime. Ted solemnly vows to give up flirtations, and May—laughing but sincere—agrees to sell her piano and cancel her music lessons with Claude.

== Cast ==
- May McAvoy as May Howard
- Conrad Nagel as Ted Howard
- Myrna Loy as Joan Whitley
- George Beranger as Claude

== Preservation ==
This film survives at the BFI National Film and Television Archive near London.

== See also ==
- List of early sound feature films (1926–1929)
