= Top Speed (musical) =

Musical by Harry Ruby and Bert Kalmar

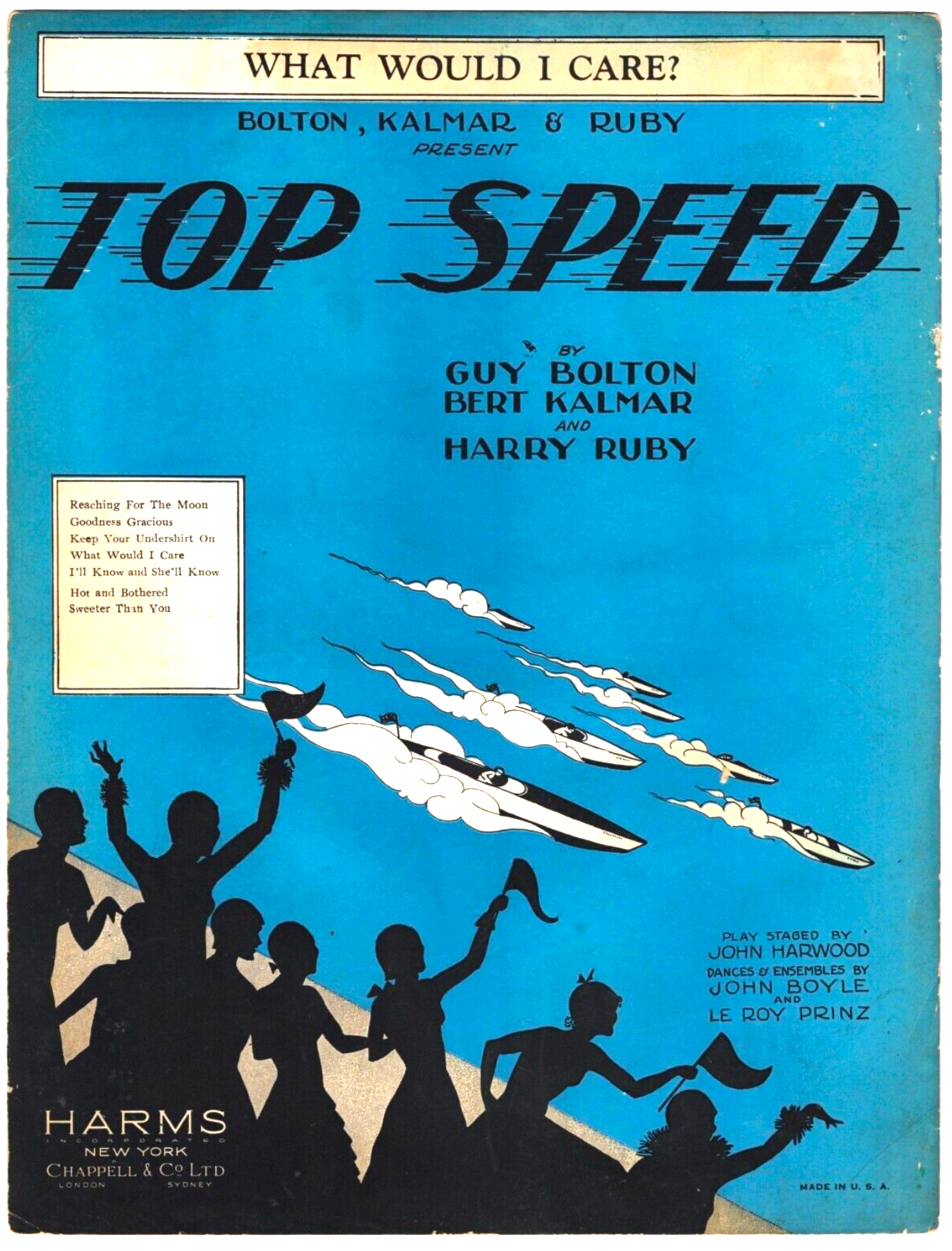
Front cover of 1929 sheet music

Top Speed is a musical in two acts with music by Harry Ruby, lyrics by Bert Kalmar, and a book co-authored by Guy Bolton, Ruby, and Kalmar. The musical is set at the Onawanda Lodge, a fictional resort in the Thousand Islands that sits on the American side of the Canada–United States border in New York. The story follows two young and financially poor American men who fall in love with two wealthy American heiresses while vacationing far above their economic means. Misadventures ensue when the boys are asked to pilot a speed boat owned by one of the girls in an international boat race.

== History ==
Top Speed premiered at the Chestnut Street Opera House in Philadelphia on November 13, 1929. The production moved to Broadway's Chanin's 46th Street Theatre where it opened on Christmas Day 1929. The production transferred in the middle of its Broadway run to the Royale Theatre where it ultimately closed on March 22, 1930, after 104 performances. The cast included Irene Delroy as Virginia Rollins, Lester Allen as Elmer Peters, Ginger Rogers as Babs Green, Harland Dixon as Tad Jordan, and Paul Frawley as Gerry Brooks.

Allen and Rogers sang the show's one hit song, the duet "Keep Your Undershirt On". The show also included an earlier hit song from Ruby and Kalmar's musical Good Boy which they interpolated into Top Speed, "I Wanna Be Loved by You".

First National Pictures adapted the musical into a 1930 film of the same name starring Joe E. Brown, Bernice Claire, Jack Whiting, Laura Lee, and Frank McHugh. It was one of the earliest stage musicals made into a film.
