= Top Speed (film) =

1930 film

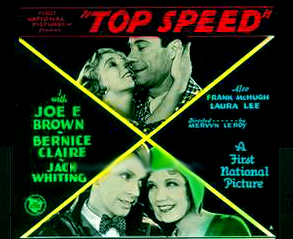
- Lantern slide
- Directed by: Mervyn LeRoy
- Written by: Humphrey Pearson; Henry McCarty
- Based on: Top Speed by: Harry Ruby; Guy Bolton; Bert Kalmar
- Starring: Joe E. Brown; Bernice Claire; Jack Whiting; Frank McHugh; Laura Lee
- Cinematography: Sidney Hickox
- Edited by: Harold Young
- Music by: Joseph Burke; Al Dubin; Leonid S. Leonardi; Larry Ceballos
- Distributed by: First National Pictures; A Subsidiary of Warner Bros. Pictures
- Release date: August 24, 1930
- Running time: 73 min.
- Country: United States
- Language: English

Top Speed is a 1930 American Pre-Code musical comedy film released by First National Pictures, a subsidiary of Warner Bros. Pictures. It was based on a 1929 stage musical of the same name by Harry Ruby, Guy Bolton and Bert Kalmar. The film stars Joe E. Brown, Bernice Claire, Jack Whiting, Laura Lee, and Frank McHugh.

== Plot ==
Elmer Peters and Gerald Brooks, bond clerks on a weekend vacation, are on the run from a local sheriff after Elmer attempts to fish in a "no fishing" area. The two men arrive at an expensive hotel where they rescue Virginia Rollins and Babs Green, who have just been involved in a car accident. Gerald falls in love with Virginia, and Elmer falls for Babs, and the two fugitives decide to remain at the hotel for the rest of the weekend. Elmer begins boasting to hotel guests and personnel; soon, everyone believes that he and Gerald are millionaires, and that Gerald is an expert boat racer.

Virginia's father owns a speedboat that he plans to enter in a big race. After he fires his pilot, whom he caught taking a bribe, Virginia convinces her father to let Gerald pilot the boat. A competitor, Spencer Colgate, discovers that Gerald is a fraud and threatens to expose him unless he accepts $30,000 to throw the race. Gerald, unable to refuse such a princely sum, agrees. Virginia and her father learn during the race that Gerald took the payoff; but Gerald chooses love and honor over riches, and drives the boat to victory. After he wins, Gerald comes clean, and all is forgiven.

== Cast ==
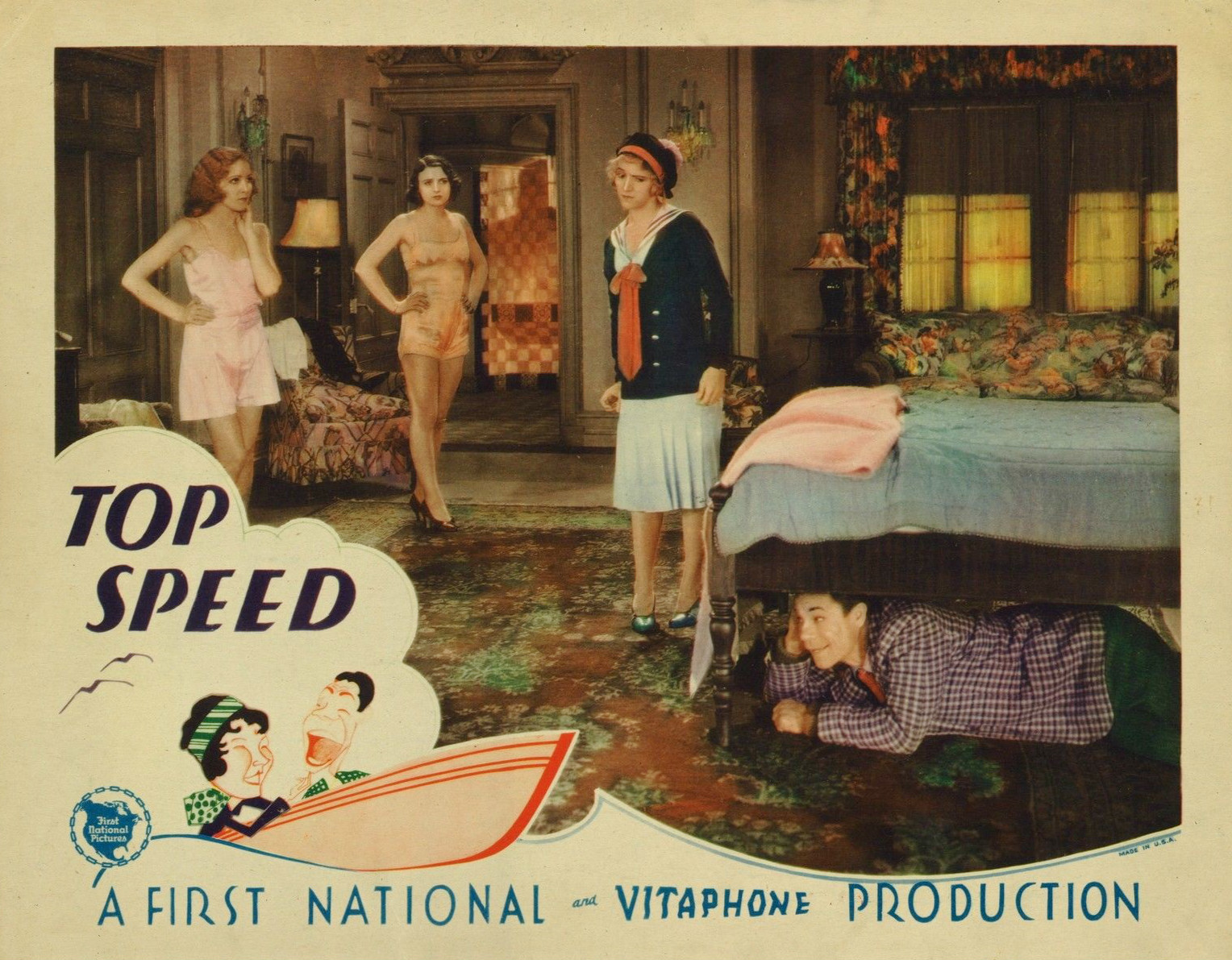
Lobby card

- Joe E. Brown as Elmer Peters
- Bernice Claire as Virginia Rollins
- Jack Whiting as Gerald Brooks
- Frank McHugh as Tad Jordan
- Laura Lee as Babs Green
- Edmund Breese as Spencer Colgate
- Wade Boteler as The Sheriff
- Rita Flynn as Daisy
- Billy Bletcher as Ipps
- George 'Gabby' Hayes as Western Union Clerk
- Al Hill as Briggs
- Edwin Maxwell as J.W. Rollins
- Cyril Ring as Vincent Colgate

== Production ==
The film was completed as a full musical. However, due to increasing disfavor towards that genre from the public (beginning in late 1930), Warner Bros. chose to make many cuts to the film and much of the original music is missing or severely truncated. The Warner re-cut survives in the Library of Congress collection.

== Preservation ==
- The film survives only in the cut version which was released in late 1930 by Warner Bros., with most of the musical numbers removed. Due to the backlash against musicals, Warner Bros. chose to cut most of the musical sequences before releasing the film.
- The film was released as a full musical outside of the United States, where a backlash against musicals never occurred. It is unknown whether a print of this longer version still exists.
- The complete soundtrack to the International Sound Version (which includes all of the original songs) survives at the UCLA Film and Television Archive on Vitaphone disks.

== Music ==
- "If You Were a Traveling Salesman and I Were a Chambermaid" (Performed by Joe E. Brown and Laura Lee)
- "Knock Knees" (Performed by Joe E. Brown, Laura Lee and chorus)
- "Looking for the Lovelight in the Dark" (Performed by Bernice Claire, Jack Whiting and chorus)
- "As Long as I Have You and You Have Me" (Cut from film; originally performed by Bernice Claire and Jack Whiting)
- "Goodness Gracious" (Cut before release in the United States)
- "I'll Know and She'll Know" (Cut before release in the United States)
- "Keep Your Undershirt On" (Cut before release in the United States)
- "What Would I Care?" (Cut before release in the United States)
- "Sweeter Than You" (Cut before release in the United States)
- "Reaching For the Moon" (Cut before release in the United States)
