= What Happened to Father? (1927 film) =

1927 film

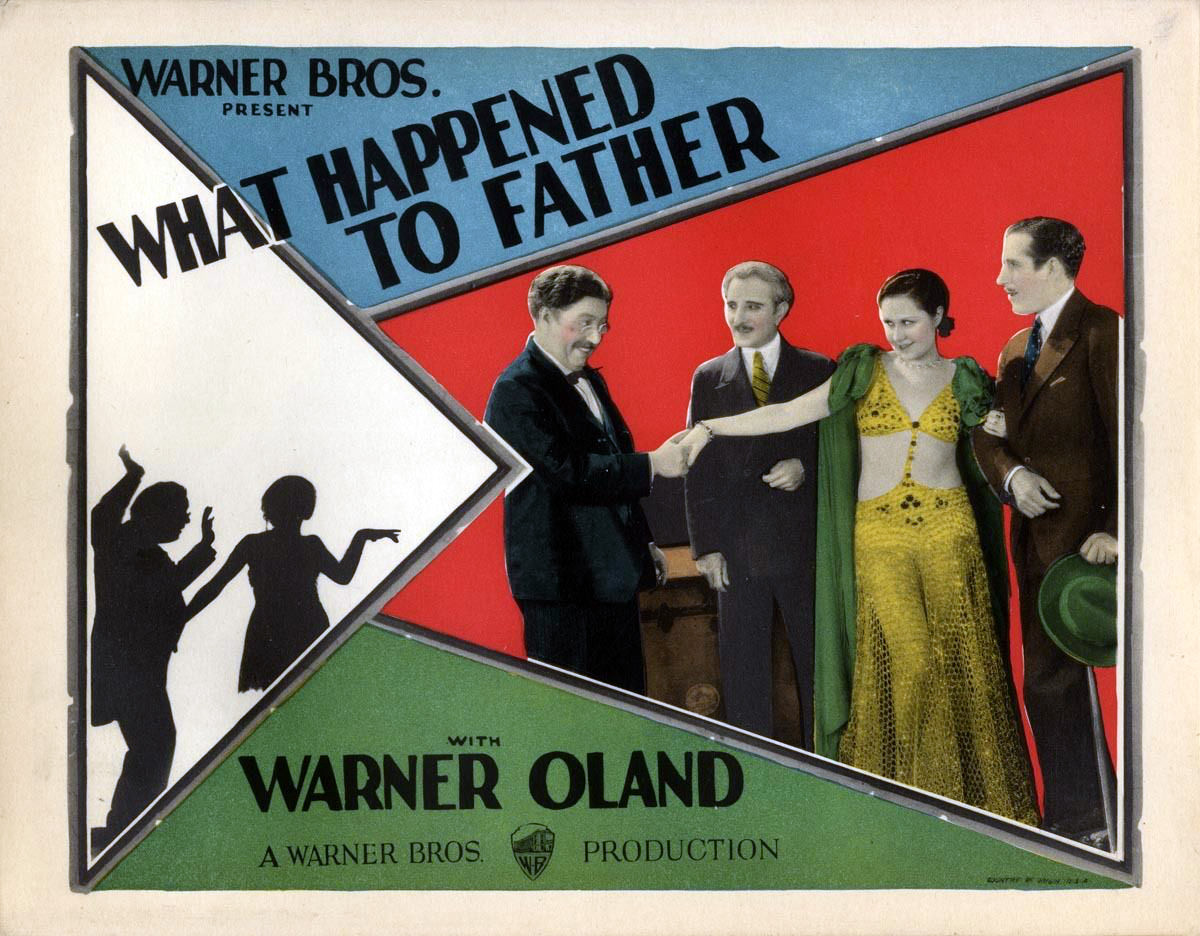
- Lobby card.
- Directed by: John G. Adolfi
- Written by: Charles R. Condon
- Based on: What Happened to Father? by Mary Roberts Rinehart
- Starring: Warner Oland; Flobelle Fairbanks; William Demarest
- Cinematography: Willard Van Enger
- Production company: Warner Bros. Pictures
- Distributed by: Warner Bros. Pictures
- Release date: June 25, 1927
- Running time: 6 reels
- Country: United States
- Language: Silent (English intertitles)

What Happened to Father? is a 1927 American silent comedy film directed by John G. Adolfi and written by Charles R. Condon. It is based on the 1909 short story of the same name by Mary Roberts Rinehart that was originally serialized in Lippincott's Monthly Magazine . The film stars Warner Oland, Flobelle Fairbanks, and William Demarest. A previous version of the story was filmed in 1915.

The film was released on June 25, 1927, by Warner Bros. Pictures.

== Cast ==
- Warner Oland as W. Bradberry, Father
- Flobelle Fairbanks as Betty Bradberry
- William Demarest as Dibbin
- Vera Lewis as Mrs. Bradberry
- John Miljan as Victor Smith
- Hugh Allan as Tommy Dawson
- Cathleen Calhoun as Violet
- Jean Lefferty as Gloria

== Preservation ==
The film is now considered lost.
