= What Happened to Father? (1915 film) =

1915 film

- Directed by: C. J. Williams
- Written by: Cecilie B. Peterson(scenario)
- Based on: a story by Mary Roberts Rinehart
- Produced by: Vitagraph Company of America
- Starring: Frank Daniels
- Production company: Vitagraph Company of America
- Distributed by: V-L-S-E
- Release date: December 27, 1915
- Running time: 5 reels
- Country: United States
- Language: Silent (English intertitles)

What Happened to Father? is a lost American 1915 silent film comedy directed by C. Jay Williams and starring stage comedian Frank Daniels. Cecilie B. Peterson penned the script from a 1909 story by Mary Roberts Rinehart.

== Cast ==
- Bernice Berner as Mother
- Frank Daniels as Father
- John Hollis as Butler
- Adele Kelly as Fredericka
- Frank Kingsley as Mortimer
- Anna Laughlin as Tommy
- Billy Quirk as Dawson Hale
- William Sellery as Uncle
- William Sloan as Carlton Bayne (*as William Sloane)

== See also ==
- What Happened to Father? (1927)
