= Charles R. Condon =

American screenwriter

- Born: July 10, 1894; Chicago, Illinois, United States
- Died: September 21, 1960 (aged 66); Hollywood, California, United States
- Occupation: Writer
- Years active: 1927–1954 (film & TV)

Charles R. Condon (1894–1960) was an American screenwriter. He worked on films and a number of serials at a variety of studios including Columbia, Warner Brothers and Universal Pictures.

== Selected filmography ==
- A Dog of the Regiment (1927)
- One-Round Hogan (1927)
- Jaws of Steel (1927)
- What Happened to Father? (1927)
- Five and Ten Cent Annie (1928)
- Caught in the Fog (1928)
- Red Wine (1928)
- A Race for Life (1928)
- Land of the Silver Fox (1928)
- Joy Street (1929)
- Brothers (1930)
- Speed Demon (1932)
- Get That Girl (1932)
- Speed Madness (1932)
- Dangerous Crossroads (1933)
- Soldiers of the Storm (1933)
- The Crime of Helen Stanley (1934)
- The Three Mesquiteers (1936)
- Headline Crasher (1936)
- The Devil Diamond (1937)
- Death in the Air (1937)
- Ten Laps to Go (1938)
- Daredevil Drivers (1938)
- Winners of the West (1940)
- Oklahoma Renegades (1940)
- The Iron Claw (1941)
- Cody of the Pony Express (1950)
- Pirates of the High Seas (1950)

== Bibliography ==
- Pitts, Michael R. Poverty Row Studios, 1929–1940: An Illustrated History of 55 Independent Film Companies, with a Filmography for Each. McFarland & Company, 2005.
