= Sherman Lowe =

American screenwriter

Sherman L. Lowe
- Born: 18 October 1894; Salt Lake City, Utah
- Died: January 24, 1968 (aged 73); Los Angeles, California
- Other names: Sherman Lewis Lowenstein
- Occupation: screenwriter
- Known for: work with Frank Buck
- Spouse: Patricia Bennet

Sherman L. Lowe (born Salt Lake City, Utah, United States (or Russia), 18 October 1894; died 24 Jan 1968, Los Angeles, California, United States) was an American screenwriter. He was a writer of the Frank Buck serial Jungle Menace.

== Early life ==
Sherman Lowe was the son of Russian immigrants, Louis Lowenstein and Johanna Blumberg Lowenstein. Sherman was educated at the University of Utah and the University of Pennsylvania. He served with the American Expeditionary Forces during World War I. A machine gun bullet wounded his right leg, September 29, 1918, at Gesnes. He was discharged with the rank of sergeant. According to the 1920 US census, he worked in Detroit as a shoe salesman.

== Hollywood ==
Lowe entered films in 1926. He was a script reader at Universal Pictures for one year, then a writer for Universal. Among the films he worked on were Arizona Cyclone, Pony Post, Bury Me Not on the Lone Prairie, Law of the Range, Black Arrow (serial), Captain Video: Master of the Stratosphere, and Parole, Inc.

== Work with Frank Buck ==
In 1937, Lowe was a writer of the Frank Buck serial Jungle Menace.

== Selected filmography ==
- Dames Ahoy! (1930)
- They Never Come Back (1932)
- Crimson Romance (1934)
- On Probation (1935)
- Circus Shadows (1935)
- Melody Trail (1935)
- With Love and Kisses (1936)
- Night Cargo (1936)
- Sing While You're Able (1937)
- Diamond Trail (1939)
- The Old Corral (1936)
- Headline Crasher (1936)
- Trapped by Television (1936)
- High Hat (1937)
- The Devil Diamond (1937)
- Arizona Days (1937)
- Daredevil Drivers (1938)
- I Demand Payment (1938)
- Mystery House (1938)
- Crashing Thru (1939)
- Everything's on Ice (1939)
- Law and Order (1940)
- Secrets of a Model (1940)
- Law of the Range (1941)
- A Yank in Libya (1942)
- Miss V from Moscow (1942)
- A Night for Crime (1943)
- Valley of the Zombies (1946)
- The Magnificent Rogue (1946)
- The Undercover Woman (1946)
- The Catman of Paris (1946)
- Parole, Inc. (1948)
- Alimony (1949)
