= Other Women's Husbands =

1926 film

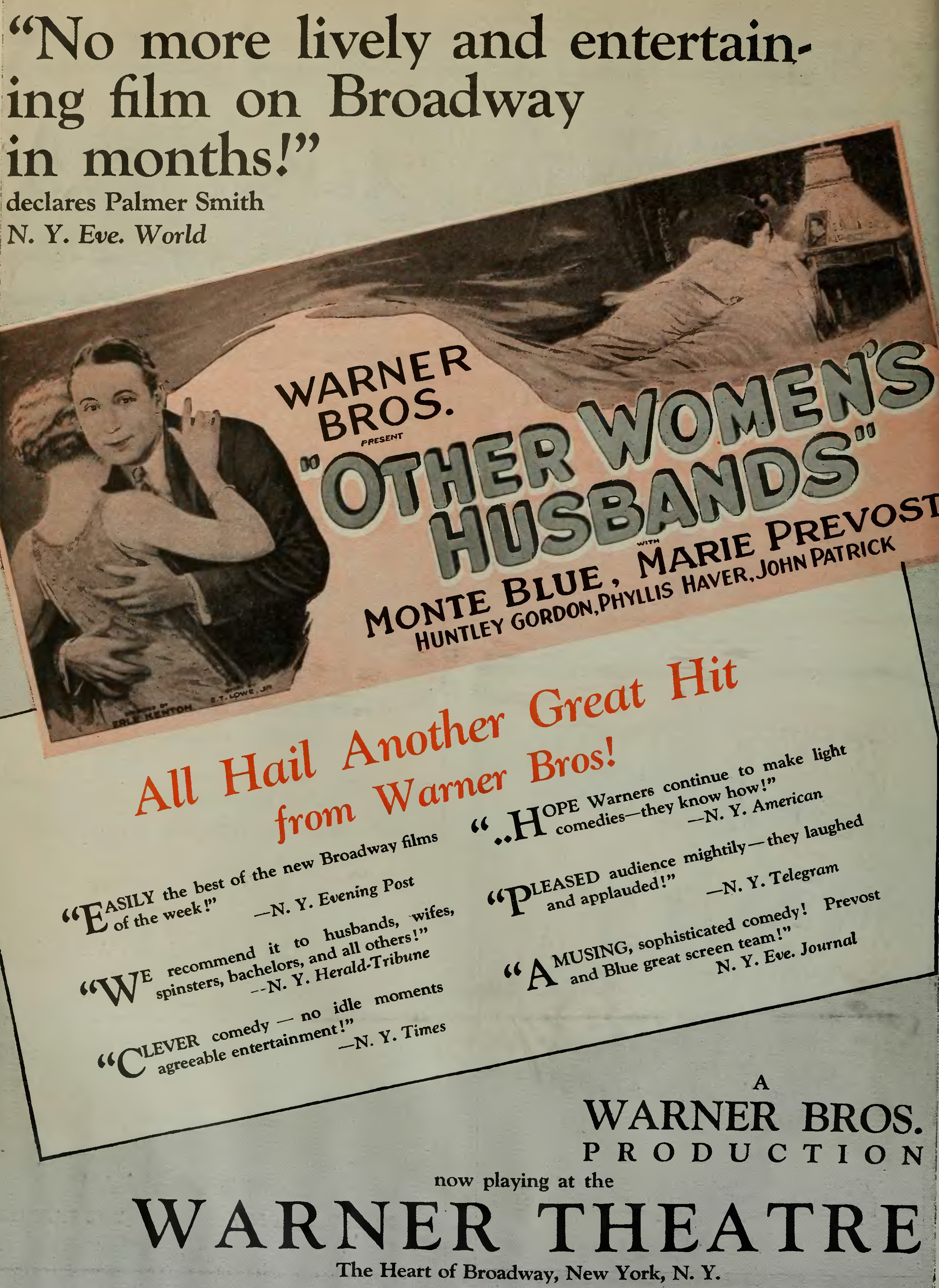
- Advertisement
- Directed by: Erle C. Kenton
- Screenplay by: Edward T. Lowe Jr. Jack Wagner
- Story by: Edward T. Lowe Jr.
- Starring: Monte Blue; Marie Prevost; Huntley Gordon; Phyllis Haver
- Cinematography: Charles Van Enger
- Production company: Warner Bros.
- Distributed by: Warner Bros.
- Release date: March 17, 1926
- Running time: 70 minutes
- Country: United States
- Language: Silent (English intertitles)

Other Women's Husbands is a 1926 American comedy film directed by Erle C. Kenton and written by Edward T. Lowe Jr. and Jack Wagner. The film stars Monte Blue, Marie Prevost, Huntley Gordon, Phyllis Haver, Marjorie Whiteis, and John Patrick. The film was released by Warner Bros. on March 17, 1926.

== Plot ==
As described in a film magazine review, when Kay, his wife goes away from town on a visit, Dick Lambert consents to attend a party arranged by an old college chum, lawyer Jack Harding. At the party, Dick meets Roxana, a flapper who has made a business of playing with husbands, for whom Dick falls hard. Kay, after learning that her husband's business engagements involve another woman, consents to Jack Harding's attentions. At a masked ball, Kay is mistaken by her husband for Roxana and he has sex with her. Kay starts divorce proceedings at Harding's suggestion. Dick tires of Roxana. The divorce case is a flivver. Dick beats up Jack. Husband and wife learn that they still love each other and are reunited.

== Cast ==
- Monte Blue as Dick Lambert
- Marie Prevost as Kay Lambert
- Huntley Gordon as Jack Harding
- Phyllis Haver as Roxana
- Marjorie Whiteis as Roxana's Friend (credited as Marjorie Gay)
- John Patrick as Dick's Chum

== Preservation ==
With no prints of Other Women's Husbands located in any film archives, it is a lost film.
