= Monte Blue =

American actor (1887–1963)

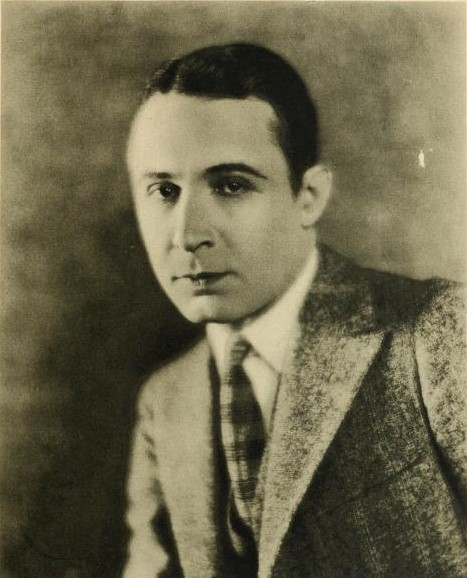
- Blue in 1924
- Born: Gerard Montgomery Bluefeather; January 11, 1887; Indianapolis, Indiana, U.S.
- Died: February 18, 1963 (aged 76); Milwaukee, Wisconsin, U.S.
- Resting place: Forest Lawn Memorial Park in Glendale, California
- Education: Purdue University
- Occupation: Actor
- Years active: 1915–1960
- Spouses: Erma Gladys King (m. 1909; div. 1923); Tova Janson (m. 1924; died 1956) Betty Jean Munson Mess (m. 1959)
- Children: 2

Gerard Montgomery Blue (né Bluefeather; January 11, 1887 – February 18, 1963) was an American film actor who began his career as a romantic lead in the silent era; and for decades after the advent of sound, he continued to perform as a supporting player in a wide range of motion pictures.

== Early life ==
Gerard Montgomery Bluefeather was born in Indianapolis, Indiana to an Irish mother, Orphalena Lousetta Springer, while his father William Jackson Blue was believed to be half French and part Cherokee and Osage. He had three brothers; Charles Bertram, Leroy, and William Morris. His father was a Civil War veteran, and served as a scout for Buffalo Bill.

When his father died in a railroad collision, his mother could not rear four children alone, so Blue and one of his brothers were admitted to the Indiana Soldiers' and Sailors' Children's Home. He eventually worked his way through Purdue University in West Lafayette, Indiana.

Blue grew to a height of 6 feet 3 inches (1.91 m). He played football and worked as a fireman, boilermaker, coal miner, cowpuncher, ranch hand, circus rider, lumberjack, and day laborer at the studios of D.W. Griffith.

== Career ==
Blue had no theatrical experience when he came to the screen. His first movie was The Birth of a Nation (1915), in which he was a stuntman and an extra. Next, he played another small part in Intolerance (1916). He also was a stuntman or stand-in for Sir Herbert Beerbohm Tree during the making of Macbeth (1916). Gradually moving to supporting roles for both D.W. Griffith and Cecil B. DeMille, Blue earned his breakthrough role as Danton in Orphans of the Storm, starring sisters Lillian and Dorothy Gish. Then, he rose to stardom as a rugged romantic lead along with top leading actresses such as Clara Bow, Gloria Swanson, and Norma Shearer. He most often acted with Marie Prevost, with whom he made several films in the mid-1920s at Warner Bros. Blue portrayed the alcoholic doctor who finds paradise in MGM's White Shadows in the South Seas (1928). Blue became one of the few silent stars to survive the sound revolution; however, he lost his investments in the stock market crash of 1929.

He rebuilt his career as a character actor, working until his retirement from films in 1954, and he played character roles in various television series until 1960, mostly Westerns, such as Annie Oakley. From the mid-1930s, he was a contract player at Warner Bros., working in character parts and as an extra.

One of his more memorable roles was as the sheriff in Key Largo opposite Lionel Barrymore.

For his contributions to the motion pictures industry, Monte Blue received a star on the Hollywood Walk of Fame at 6290 Hollywood Boulevard on February 8, 1960.

== Personal life ==
Blue divorced his first wife in 1923 and the following year married Tova Janson, daughter of actress Bodil Rosing. He had two children, Barbara Ann and Richard Monte. During the later part of his life, Blue was an active Mason and served as the advance man for the Hamid-Morton Shrine Circus. In 1963, while on business in Milwaukee, Wisconsin, he died after suffering a heart attack attributed to complications from influenza. He is interred next to his mother-in-law, Bodil Rosing, at Forest Lawn Memorial Park in Glendale, California.

== Selected filmography ==
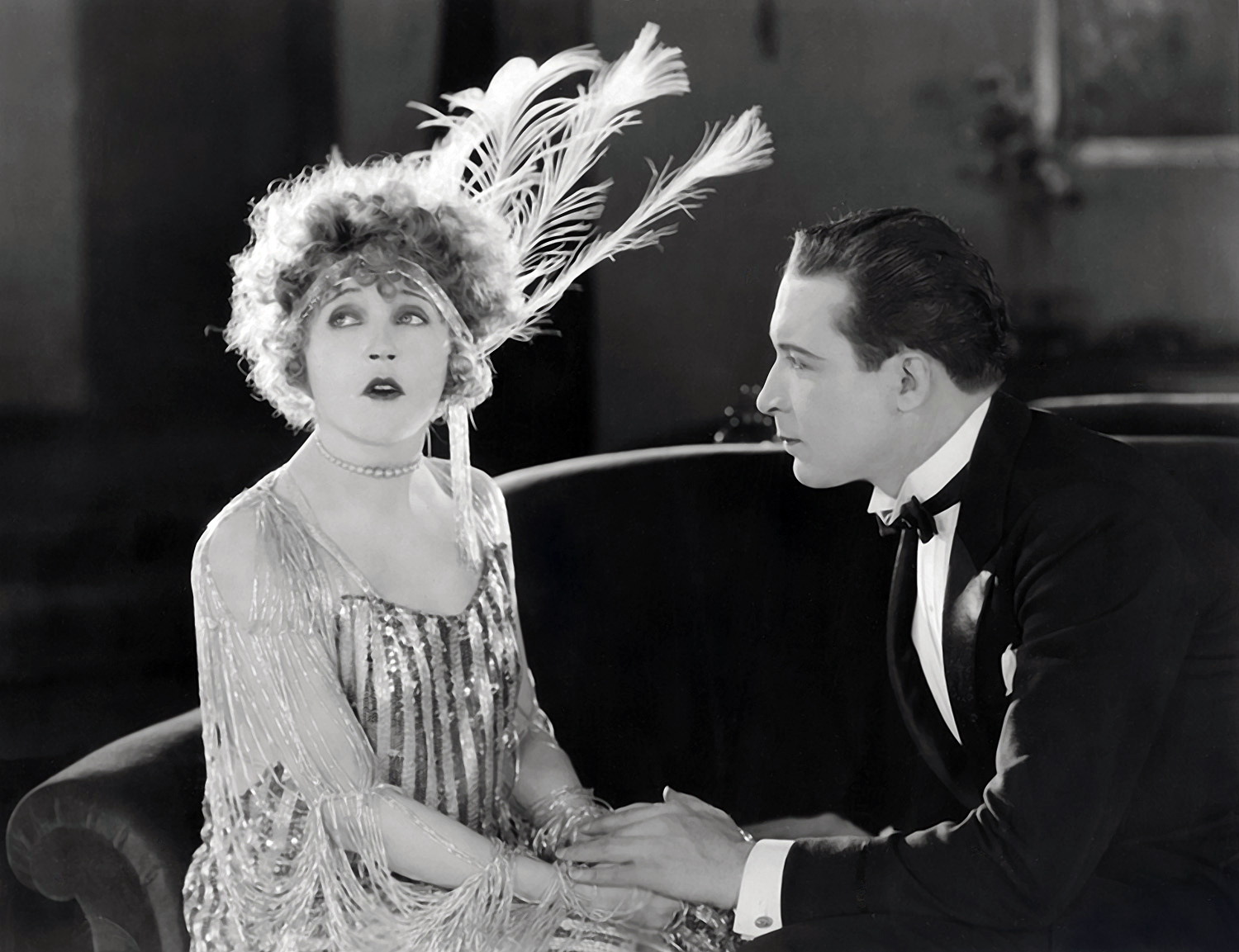
Mae Murray and Blue in Broadway Rose (1922)

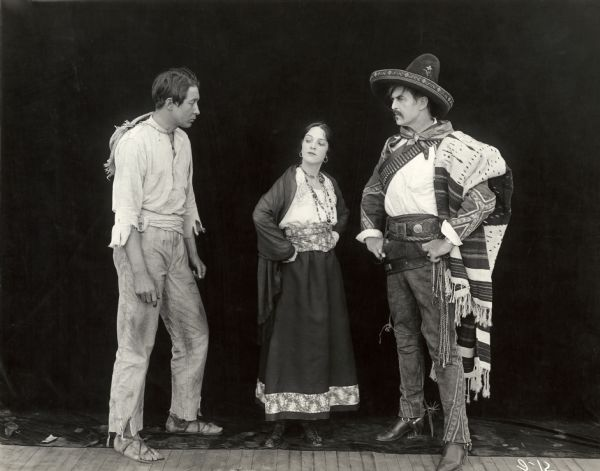
Blue (left) with Miriam Cooper and Hobart Bosworth in a production still promoting Betrayed (1917)

- The Birth of a Nation (1915) as Minor Role (uncredited)
- The Absentee (1915) as Ignorance
- The Wild Girl from the Hills (1915, Short)
- Ghosts (1915) as Bohemian in Paris
- The Noon Hour (1915, Short) as Ada's Brother
- Editions de Luxe (1915, Short) as Conny Peters - Swindler
- For His Pal (1915, Short) as Jo Price
- Hidden Crime (1915, Short) as Grant - the Grazer
- The Family Doctor (1915, Short) as Dr. John Montrose
- Martyrs of the Alamo (1915) as Defender of the Alamo (uncredited)
- The Price of Power (1916) as Minor Role (uncredited)
- The Man Behind the Curtain (1916) (uncredited)
- The Devil's Needle (1916) as Bartender (uncredited)
- Hell-to-Pay Austin (1916) as Minor Role (uncredited)
- Intolerance (1916) as The Strike Leader
- The Vagabond Prince (1916) as Peasant (uncredited)
- The Microscope Mystery (1916) as Jud
- The Matrimaniac (1916, Short) as Assistant Hotel Manager (uncredited)
- Jim Bludso (1917) as Joe Bower
- Besty's Burglar (1917) as Victor Gilpin
- Hands Up! (1917) as Dan Tracy
- Wild and Woolly (1917) as One of Wild Bill's Men (uncredited)
- Betrayed (1917) as Pepo Esparenza
- The Man from Painted Post (1917) as Slim Carter
- The Ship of Doom (1917) as Martin Shaw
- The Red, Red Heart (1918) as Billy Porter
- Riders of the Night (1918) as 'The Killer' Jed
- M'Liss (1918) as Mexican Joe Dominguez
- The Only Road (1918) as Pedro Lupo
- Hands Up (1918, Serial)
- Till I Come Back to You (1918) as American Doughboy
- Johanna Enlists (1918) as Pvt. Vibbard
- The Romance of Tarzan (1918) as Juan
- The Eyes of Mystery (1918)* (uncredited; Blue appears on lobby poster with Edith Storey)
- The Goddess of Lost Lake (1918) (uncredited)
- The Squaw Man (1918) as Happy
- Romance and Arabella (1919) as Harry Atteridge
- Pettigrew's Girl (1919) as Pvt. William Pettigrew
- Rustling a Bride (1919) as Nick McCredie
- Told in the Hills (1919) as Kalitan
- In Mizzoura (1919) as Sam Fowler
- Everywoman (1919) as Love
- Too Much Johnson (1919) as Billy Lounsberry
- The Thirteenth Commandment (1920) as Bayard Kip
- A Cumberland Romance (1920) as Sherd Raines
- Something to Think About (1920) as Jim Dirk
- The Jucklins (1921) as Bill Hawes
- The Kentuckians (1921) as Boone Stallard
- A Perfect Crime (1921) as Wally Griggs
- A Broken Doll (1921) as Tommy Dawes
- Moonlight and Honeysuckle (1921) as Ted Musgrove
- The Affairs of Anatol (1921) as Abner Elliott
- Orphans of the Storm (1921) as Danton
- Peacock Alley (1922) as Elmer Harmon
- My Old Kentucky Home (1922) as Richard Goodloe
- Broadway Rose (1922) as Tom Darcy
- The Tents of Allah (1923) as Chiddar Ben-Ek
- Brass (1923) as Philip Baldwin
- Main Street (1923) as Dr. Will Kennicott
- The Purple Highway (1923) as Edgar Prentice, aka Edgar Craig
- Defying Destiny (1923) as Jack Fenton
- Lucretia Lombard (1923) as Stephen Winship
- The Marriage Circle (1924) as Dr. Franz Braun
- Loving Lies (1924) as Captain Dan stover
- Mademoiselle Midnight (1924) as Owen Burke / Jerry Brent
- How to Educate a Wife (1924) as Ernest Todd
- Daughters of Pleasure (1924) as Kent Merrill
- Revelation (1924) as Paul Granville
- Being Respectable (1924) as Charles Carpenter
- Her Marriage Vow (1924) as Bob Hilton
- The Lover of Camille (1924) as Jean Gaspard Deburau
- The Dark Swan (1924) as Lewis Dike
- Recompense (1925) as Peter Graham
- Kiss Me Again (1925) as Gaston Fleury
- The Limited Mail (1925) as Bob Wilson / Bob Snobson
- Red Hot Tires (1925) as Al Jones
- Hogan's Alley (1925) as Lefty O'Brien
- The Man Upstairs (1926) as Geoffrey West
- Other Women's Husbands (1926) as Dick Lambert
- So This Is Paris (1926) as Dr. Paul Giraud
- Across the Pacific (1926) as Monte
- Wolf's Clothing (1927) as Barry Baline
- The Brute (1927) as Easy Going Martin Sondes
- Bitter Apples (1927) as John Wyncote
- The Black Diamond Express (1927) as Dan Foster
- The Bush Leaguer (1927) as Buchanan 'Specs' White
- One Round Hogan (1927) as Robert Emmett Hogan
- Brass Knuckles (1927) as Zac Harrison
- Across the Atlantic (1928) as Hugh Clayton
- White Shadows in the South Seas (1928) as Dr. Matthew Lloyd
- Conquest (1928) as Donald Overton
- The Greyhound Limited (1929) as Monte
- No Defense (1929) as Monte Collins
- From Headquarters (1929) as Happy Smith
- Skin Deep (1929) as Joe Daley
- The Show of Shows (1929) as Condemned Man (segment "Rifle Execution")
- Tiger Rose (1929) as Devlin
- Isle of Escape (1930) as Dave Wade
- Those Who Dance (1930) as Dan Hogan
- The Flood (1931) as David Bruce
- The Big Gamble (1931) as Policeman (uncredited)
- The Stoker (1932) as Dick Martin
- Officer Thirteen (1932) as Tom Burke
- Her Forgotten Past (1933) as Donald Thorne
- The Thundering Herd (1933) as Smiley
- The Intruder (1933) as John Brandt
- Come On, Marines! (1934) as Lt. Allen
- The Last Round-Up (1934) as Jack Kells
- Wagon Wheels (1934) as Kenneth Murdock
- Student Tour (1934) as Jeff Kane - Bobby's Brother and Coach of the Crew
- The Lives of a Bengal Lancer (1935) as Hamzulla Khan
- On Probation (1935) as Al Murray
- G Men (1935) as Fingerprint Expert
- Social Error (1935) as Dean Carter
- The Test (1935) as Pepite LaJoie
- Trails of the Wild (1935) as Mountie Larry Doyle
- Wanderer of the Wasteland (1935) as Guerd Larey
- Hot Off the Press (1935)
- Nevada (1935) as Clem Dillon
- Desert Gold (1936) as Chetley 'Chet' Kasedon
- Treachery Rides the Range (1936) as Colonel Drummond
- Undersea Kingdom (1936, Serial) as Unga Khan
- Prison Shadows (1936) as Bert McNamee
- Mary of Scotland (1936) as Messenger
- Ride, Ranger, Ride (1936) as Duval, aka Chief Tavibo
- The Plainsman (1936) as Indian (uncredited)
- Song of the Gringo (1936) as Sheriff
- A Million to One (1937) as John Kent Sr.
- Secret Agent X-9 (1937, Serial) as Baron Michael Karsten
- The Outcasts of Poker Flat (1937) as Indian Jim
- Rootin' Tootin' Rhythm (1937) as Joe Stafford
- High, Wide and Handsome (1937) as Oil Man (uncredited)
- Souls at Sea (1937) as Mate
- Sky Racket (1937) as Benjamin Arnold
- Thunder Trail (1937) as Jeff Graves
- A Damsel in Distress (1937) as Bit Role (uncredited)
- Born to the West (1937) as Bart Hammond
- Amateur Crook (1937) as Crone
- The Big Broadcast of 1938 (1938) as Passenger (uncredited)
- Cocoanut Grove (1938) as Minor Role (uncredited)
- The Great Adventures of Wild Bill Hickok (1938, Serial) as Mr. Cameron
- Rebellious Daughters (1938) as Charlie - alias Clint Houston
- Spawn of the North (1938) as Cannery Official (uncredited)
- The Mysterious Rider (1938) as Cap Folsom
- King of Alcatraz (1938) as Officer
- Touchdown, Army (1938) as Pilot (uncredited)
- Illegal Traffic (1938) as Captain Moran
- Hawk of the Wilderness (1938) as Yellow Weasel
- Tom Sawyer, Detective (1938) as Sheriff Walker
- Dodge City (1939) as John Barlow
- Frontier Pony Express (1939) as Cherokee
- Juarez (1939) as Lerdo de Tajada
- Union Pacific (1939) as Indian (uncredited)
- Port of Hate (1939) as Hammond
- Our Leading Citizen (1939) as Frank
- Geronimo (1939) as Interpreter
- Days of Jesse James (1939) as Train Passenger
- Road to Singapore (1940) as High Priest (uncredited)
- Mystery Sea Raider (1940) as Captain Norberg
- A Little Bit of Heaven (1940) as Uncle Pat
- Young Bill Hickok (1940) as Marshal Evans
- North West Mounted Police (1940) as Indian (uncredited)
- Texas Rangers Ride Again (1940) as Pablo Slide Along
- Arkansas Judge (1941) as Phil Johnson
- The Great Train Robbery (1941) as The Super
- Scattergood Pulls the Strings (1941) as Ben Mott
- Riders of Death Valley (1941) as Rance Davis
- Sunset in Wyoming (1941) as Jim Hayes
- Citadel of Crime (1941) as Minor Role (uncredited)
- Bad Man of Deadwood (1941) as Sheriff Jordan
- King of the Texas Rangers (1941, Serial) as Tom J. King Sr. [Ch. 1]
- New York Town (1941) as McAuliffe (uncredited)
- Sullivan's Travels (1941) as Policeman in Slums (uncredited)
- Law of the Timber (1941) as Hodge Mason
- Pacific Blackout (1941) as Colonel (uncredited)
- Treat 'Em Rough (1942) as Police Captain
- North to the Klondike (1942) as John Burke
- The Remarkable Andrew (1942) as Policeman (uncredited)
- Reap the Wild Wind (1942) as Officer at Tea (uncredited)
- Klondike Fury (1942) as Flight Dispatcher
- My Favorite Blonde (1942) as Policeman at Union Hall (uncredited)
- The Great Man's Lady (1942) as Man #2 - Hoyt City (uncredited)
- Secret Enemies (1942) as Hugo Mehl - the Doorman
- The Palm Beach Story (1942) as Mike the Doorman (uncredited)
- Across the Pacific (1942) as Dan Morton
- The Forest Rangers (1942) as Hotel Clerk (uncredited)
- I Married a Witch (1942) as Doorman (uncredited)
- The Hidden Hand (1942) as Matthews, the Undertaker (uncredited)
- Road to Morocco (1942) as Kasim's Aide (uncredited)
- Gentleman Jim (1942) as Gambler in "Lucky Guy" (uncredited)
- Casablanca (1942) as American (uncredited)
- The Hard Way (1943) as Man in Audience (uncredited)
- Truck Busters (1943) as Scrappy O'Brien
- Edge of Darkness (1943) as Petersen (uncredited)
- Mission to Moscow (1943) as Heckler (uncredited)
- Action in the North Atlantic (1943) as Seaman (uncredited)
- Pilot No. 5 (1943) as Bus Station Official (uncredited)
- Thank Your Lucky Stars (1943) as Bartender in Errol Flynn Number (uncredited)
- Northern Pursuit (1943) as Jean
- Passage to Marseille (1944) as Second Mate (uncredited)
- The Adventures of Mark Twain (1944) as Captain of 'Queen of Dixie' (uncredited)
- The Mask of Dimitrios (1944) as Abdul Dhris
- Janie (1944) as Policeman (uncredited)
- The Conspirators (1944) as Jennings (uncredited)
- The Horn Blows at Midnight (1945) as The Chef (uncredited)
- Escape in the Desert (1945) as Sheriff (uncredited)
- Danger Signal (1945) as Policeman in Car (uncredited)
- Saratoga Trunk (1945) as Fireman on Train (uncredited)
- San Antonio (1945) as Cleve Andrews
- Cinderella Jones (1946) as Jailer
- A Stolen Life (1946) as Mr. Lippencott (uncredited)
- Her Kind of Man (1946) as Lake (uncredited)
- Janie Gets Married (1946) as Drapery Man (uncredited)
- Two Guys from Milwaukee (1946) as Broadcast Director (uncredited)
- Shadow of a Woman (1946) as Mike
- Never Say Goodbye (1946) as Policeman (uncredited)
- Humoresque (1946) as Moving Man (uncredited)
- The Time, the Place and the Girl (1946) as Stage Manager (uncredited)
- The Man I Love (1947) as Cop (uncredited)
- The Unfaithful (1947) as Businessman with Hunter (uncredited)
- That Way with Women (1947) as MacPherson
- Bells of San Fernando (1947) as Governor Don Sebastian Fernando
- Stallion Road (1947) as Horse Rancher (uncredited)
- Possessed (1947) as Norris
- Cheyenne (1947) as Timberline
- Life with Father (1947) as The Policeman
- My Wild Irish Rose (1947) as Replacement Barman (uncredited)
- Speed to Spare (1948) as Bit Role (scenes deleted)
- Silver River (1948) as 'Buck' Chevigee
- The Big Punch (1948) as Police Lt. Ryan (uncredited)
- Key Largo (1948) as Sheriff Ben Wade
- Two Guys from Texas (1948) as Pete Nash
- Johnny Belinda (1948) as Ben (uncredited)
- Adventures of Don Juan (1948) as Turnkey (uncredited)
- Flaxy Martin (1949) as Joe, Detective
- South of St. Louis (1949) as Capt. Jeffrey
- Homicide (1949) as Sheriff George
- The Younger Brothers (1949) as Deputy Joe
- Colorado Territory (1949) as U.S. Marshal (uncredited)
- Look for the Silver Lining (1949) as St. Clair - Actor in 'Uncle Tom's Cabin' (uncredited)
- The Fountainhead (1949) as Gas Station Executive (uncredited)
- Ranger of Cherokee Strip (1949) as Chief Hunter
- The Big Wheel (1949) as Deacon Jones
- Montana (1950) as Charlie Penrose (uncredited)
- The Blonde Bandit (1950) as Police Chief Ramsey
- Backfire (1950) as Detective Sgt. Pluther (uncredited)
- Colt .45 (1950) as Townsman (uncredited)
- The Iroquois Trail (1950) as Chief Sagamore
- This Side of the Law (1950) as The Sheriff
- Dallas (1950) as Tarrant County Sheriff (uncredited)
- Three Desperate Men (1951) as Marshal Pete Coleman
- Snake River Desperadoes (1951) as Jim Haverly
- Warpath (1951) as First Emigrant
- Gold Raiders (1951) as John Sawyer
- The Sea Hornet (1951) as Lt. Drake
- Rose of Cimarron (1952) as Lone Eagle
- The Story of Will Rogers (1952) as Oklahoma Delegate (uncredited)
- Hangman's Knot (1952) as Maxwell
- The System (1953) as Man at Hearing (uncredited)
- The Last Posse (1953) as Uncle Will Kane (uncredited)
- Ride, Vaquero! (1953) as Bartender (uncredited)
- The Boy from Oklahoma (1954) as Townsman (uncredited)
- Apache (1954) as Geronimo
- Adventures of the Texas Kid: Border Ambush (1954) as Sheriff
- Wagon Train (1957) as Chief Thundercloud, episode: The Clara Beauchamp Story
