= How to Educate a Wife =

1924 film

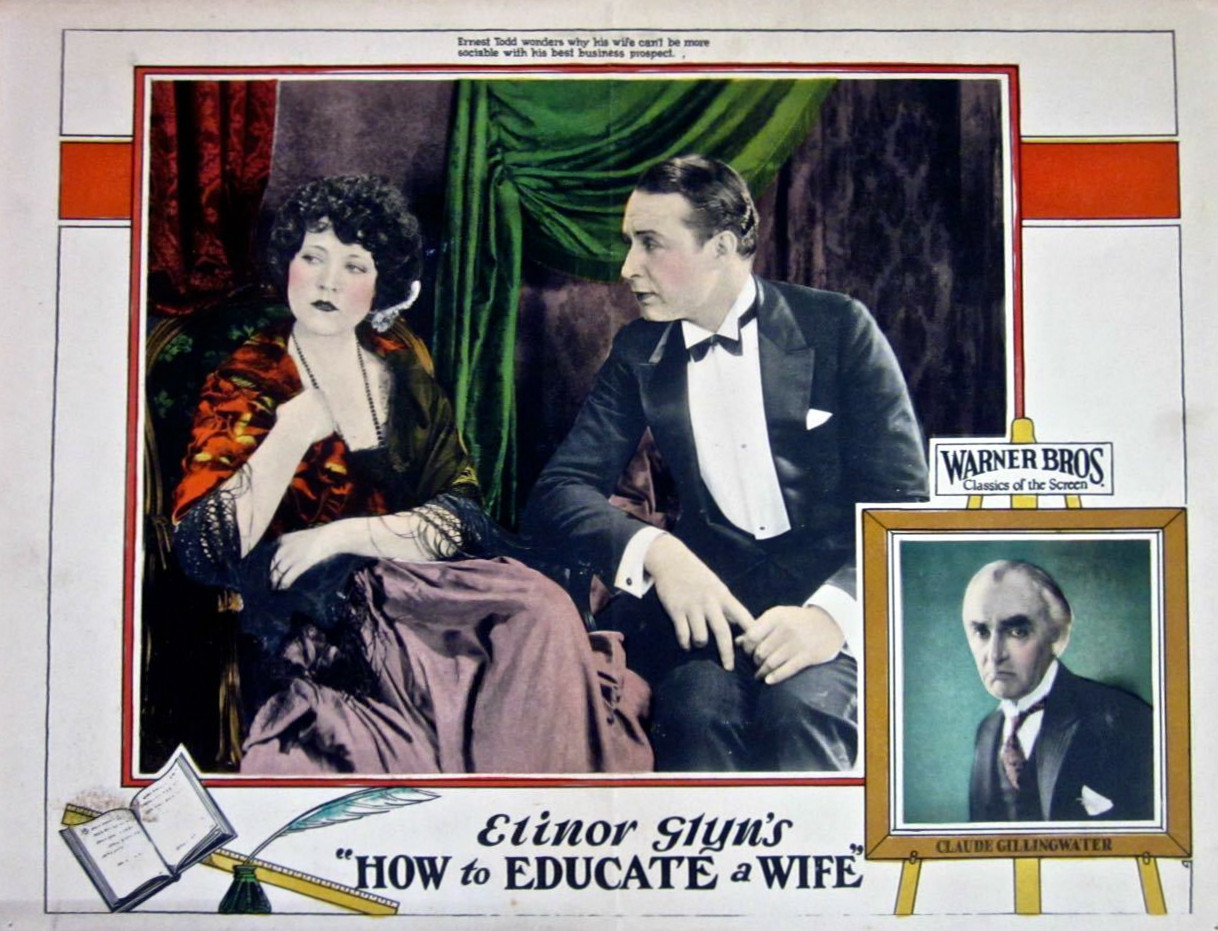
- Directed by: Monta Bell
- Screenplay by: Grant Carpenter; Douglas Z. Doty
- Story by: Elinor Glyn
- Starring: Marie Prevost; Monte Blue; Claude Gillingwater; Vera Lewis; Betty Francisco; Creighton Hale
- Cinematography: Charles Van Enger
- Production company: Warner Bros.
- Distributed by: Warner Bros.
- Release date: May 1, 1924
- Running time: 70 minutes
- Country: United States
- Language: English
- Budget: $60,000
- Box office: $272,000

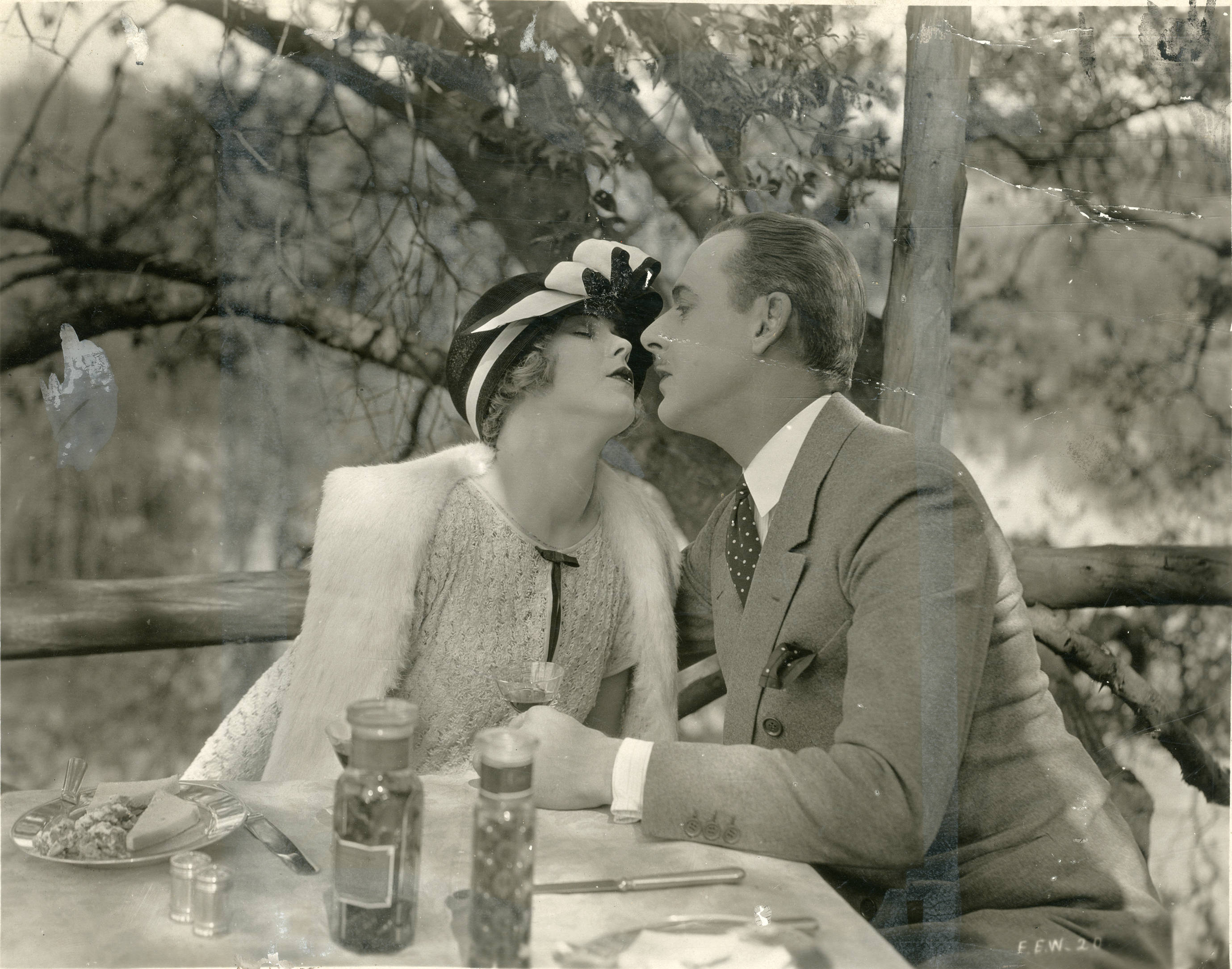
1924 Photo

How to Educate a Wife is a lost 1924 American silent comedy film directed by Monta Bell and written by Grant Carpenter and Douglas Z. Doty. The film stars Marie Prevost, Monte Blue, Claude Gillingwater, Vera Lewis, Betty Francisco and Creighton Hale. The film was released by Warner Bros. on May 1, 1924.

== Cast ==
- Marie Prevost as Mabel Todd
- Monte Blue as Ernest Todd
- Claude Gillingwater as Henry Bancks
- Vera Lewis as Mrs. Bancks
- Betty Francisco as Betty Breese
- Creighton Hale as Billy Breese
- Edward Earle as Robert Benson
- Nellie Bly Baker as Katinka

== Box office ==
According to Warner Bros records the film earned $244,000 domestic and $28,000 foreign.
