= Daughters of Pleasure =

1924 film by William Beaudine

- Directed by: William Beaudine
- Written by: Eve Unsell; Harvey F. Thew (titles)
- Based on: A story by Caleb Proctor
- Produced by: B.F. Zeidman
- Starring: Marie Prevost; Monte Blue; Clara Bow
- Cinematography: Charles Van Enger
- Edited by: Edward C McDermott
- Distributed by: Principal Distributors
- Release date: June 15, 1924
- Country: United States

Daughters of Pleasure is a 1924 American silent romantic comedy film directed by William Beaudine and starring Marie Prevost and Monte Blue. Based on a story by Caleb Proctor, the film features an early appearance by Clara Bow who plays a supporting role.

An incomplete print of the film is housed at the Library of Congress with two of the six reels missing.

== Cast ==
- Marie Prevost - Marjory Hadley
- Monte Blue - Kent Merrill
- Clara Bow - Lila Millas
- Edythe Chapman - Mrs. Hadley
- Wilfred Lucas - Mark Hadley
- Edwin B. Tilton - Uncredited role
