= Three Women (1924 film) =

1924 film directed by Ernst Lubitsch

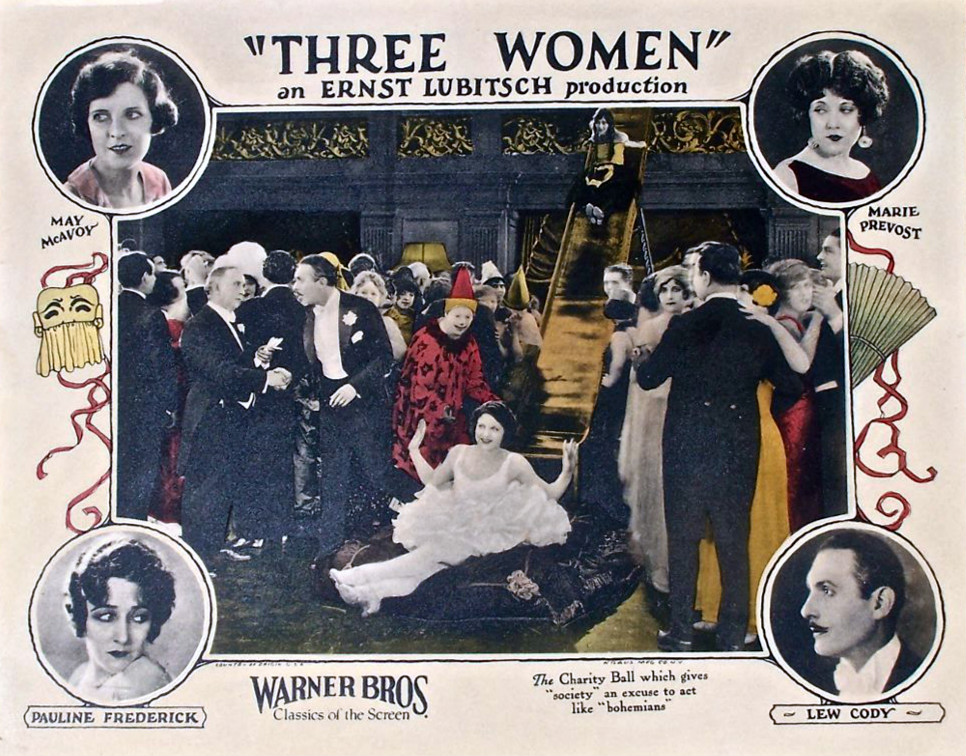
- Lobby card
- Directed by: Ernst Lubitsch
- Screenplay by: Hanns Kraly
- Story by: Ernst Lubitsch; Hanns Kraly
- Based on: Lillis Ehe by Yolande Maree
- Produced by: Ernst Lubitsch
- Starring: May McAvoy; Pauline Frederick; Marie Prevost
- Cinematography: Charles Rosher; Charles Van Enger
- Distributed by: Warner Bros. Pictures (US); UFA (Germany)
- Release dates: October 2, 1924 (Germany); September 16, 1924 (U.S.)
- Running time: 83 minutes
- Countries: Germany; United States
- Language: Silent (English intertitles)
- Budget: $329,000
- Box office: $438,000

Three Women (1924) by Ernst Lubitsch

Three Women, also known as Die Frau, die Freundin und die Dirne, is a 1924 German-American silent drama film starring May McAvoy, Pauline Frederick, and Marie Prevost, directed by Ernst Lubitsch, and based on the novel Lillis Ehe by Yolande Maree (Iolanthe Mares).

== Plot ==
Sleazy bon vivant Edmund Lamont continues to live the high life despite being up to his eyebrows in debt. He begins wooing wealthy socialite Mabel Wilton, conning her into giving him $100,000 to "invest" for her. Meanwhile, her daughter Jeanne unexpectedly arrives from private school, and when Lamont sees her, he promptly begins seeing her surreptitiously. Inevitably both women find out the deception, but the smitten Jeanne agrees to marry him anyway. True to form, Lamont starts seeing Harriet (the third woman of the title), leading to a night club brawl in which he's knocked out with a champagne bottle. He is taken home by Fred, newly graduated from medical school, who is shocked to learn that Jeanne, his presumptive fiancée, is already married to the man he brought home. Things begin to escalate even more, culminating in a shooting death and a murder trial.

== Cast ==
- May McAvoy as Jeanne Wilton
- Pauline Frederick as Mrs. Mabel Wilton
- Marie Prevost as Harriet
- Lew Cody as Edmund Lamont
- Willard Louis as Harvey Craig
- Pierre Gendron as Fred Armstrong
- Mary Carr as His mother
- Raymond McKee as Fred's friend
- Max Davidson as The Jeweler (uncredited)
- Charles Farrell as College Boy (uncredited)
- George J. Lewis as College Boy (uncredited)
- Tom Ricketts as The Butler (uncredited)
- Rolfe Sedan as Nightclub patron (uncredited)
- Hal Thompson as Minor Role (uncredited)
- Jane Winton as Charity Ball Guest (uncredited)

== Box office ==
According to Warner Bros. records the film earned $344,000 domestically and $94,000 foreign making it the studio's most popular film of 1924–25.

== Preservation status ==
Prints of Three Women are in the collections of the George Eastman Museum and Filmmuseum München. It was transferred onto 16mm film by Associated Artists Productions in the 1950s and shown on television. A restored version running approximately 70 minutes, with a new orchestral score by Andrew Earle Simpson, has aired on Turner Classic Movies and was released on Blu-ray Disc in 2022 by Kino Lorber.
