= The Marriage Circle =

1924 silent comedy film by Ernst Lubitsch

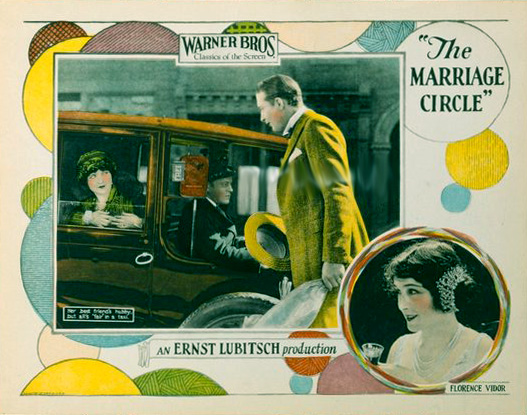
- Lobby card
- Directed by: Ernst Lubitsch
- Written by: Paul Bern (scenario); Victor Vance (intertitles)
- Based on: Only a Dream by Lothar Schmidt
- Produced by: Ernst Lubitsch
- Starring: Adolphe Menjou; Florence Vidor; Monte Blue; Marie Prevost
- Cinematography: Charles Van Enger
- Production company: Warner Bros.
- Distributed by: Warner Bros. (US); UFA (Germany)
- Release date: February 3, 1924 (New York)
- Running time: 85 minutes
- Country: United States
- Language: Silent (English intertitles)
- Budget: $212,000
- Box office: $427,000 (worldwide rentals)

The Marriage Circle (1924)

The Marriage Circle is a 1924 American silent comedy film produced and directed by Ernst Lubitsch and distributed by Warner Bros. Based on the play Only a Dream by Lothar Schmidt, the screenplay was written by Paul Bern. The "circle" of the title refers to the ring of infidelities (suspected and otherwise) central to the plot.

The film was remade in 1932 by Lubitsch and George Cukor as One Hour with You.

== Plot ==
In 1923 Vienna, when Mizzi threatens to leave her husband, Prof. Josef Stock, for "cruelty" for being indifferent to an invitation from her friend Charlotte to introduce them to her husband, he smiles at the suggestion, which infuriates her; she changes her mind and refuses to accommodate him. She goes alone. When Prof. Stock sees his wife get into a taxi with a man, he cheers up. (He later hires a private detective to obtain proof of her misconduct for a divorce.) As it turns out, they are strangers, merely sharing the taxi.

Charlotte greets Mizzi warmly and tells her how happy her marriage is, Mizzi warns her it will not last. Charlotte's husband, Franz Braun, returns home; it is the man she flirted with in the taxi. Mizzi later tries to seduce him. Franz loves his wife and, despite Mizzi's wiles, he never succumbs to her blandishments, even though she cleverly diverts his wife's jealousy to another woman, leaving the road clear for herself.

The situation is complicated by the fact that Franz's wife is greatly admired by his medical partner, Dr. Gustav Mueller, who, though not encouraged, loses no opportunity to press his suit. Out of this entanglement, Franz finally comes clean and regains his wife's confidence, while Mizzi and Dr. Mueller turn their attention to each other, with Prof. Stock left without his divorce.

== Cast ==
- Monte Blue as Doctor Braun
- Florence Vidor as Charlotte, his wife
- Creighton Hale as Doctor Mueller
- Adolphe Menjou as Professor Josef Stock
- Marie Prevost as Mizzie, his wife
- Harry Myers as A Detective
- Dale Fuller as A Nervous Woman
- Esther Ralston as Miss Hofer
- Alan George (uncredited)

== Box office ==
According to Warner Bros. records, the film earned $373,000 domestically and $54,000 in foreign markets.

== Preservation ==
This film is extant, in English and Spanish, preserved in a variety of formats at a number of archives. U.S. archives holding this film include the Museum of Modern Art and the UCLA Film & Television Archive.
