= The Dark Swan (film) =

1924 film by Millard Webb

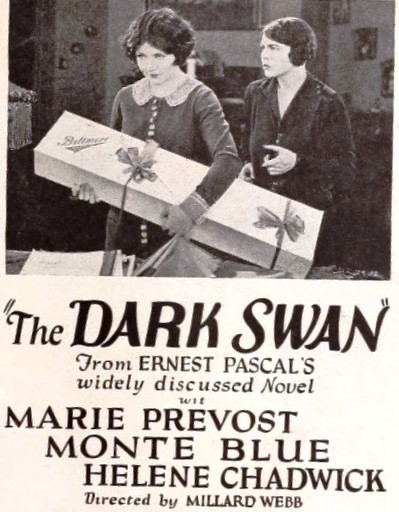
- Advertisement
- Directed by: Millard Webb
- Screenplay by: Frederick J. Jackson
- Based on: The Dark Swan by Ernest Pascal
- Starring: Marie Prevost; Monte Blue; Helene Chadwick; John Patrick; Lilyan Tashman; Vera Lewis
- Cinematography: David Abel; Millard Webb
- Production company: Warner Bros.
- Distributed by: Warner Bros.
- Release date: November 26, 1924
- Running time: 70 minutes
- Country: United States
- Language: Silent (English intertitles)
- Budget: $103,000
- Box office: $261,000

The Dark Swan is a 1924 American drama film directed by Millard Webb and written by Frederick J. Jackson. It is based on the 1924 novel The Dark Swan by Ernest Pascal. The film stars Marie Prevost, Monte Blue, Helene Chadwick, John Patrick, Lilyan Tashman, and Vera Lewis. The film was released by Warner Bros. on November 26, 1924.

== Plot ==
As described in a review in a film magazine, because she is a clever vamp, Eve Quinn has generally had her way with men, while her sister Cornelia, a quiet, deep-thinking girl, cannot bring herself to deliberately pursue them. So Eve wins Lewis Dike, who Cornelia loves. Immediately after her marriage, Eve begins a series of dangerous adventures with Wilfred Meadows. Lewis learns of them and endeavors to reason with his wife, but she will not listen to him. As Cornelia plans to sail for Europe, Lewis meets her at the dock. He tells her that he has made a mistake in marrying Eve, that they are to be divorced, and that he loves Cornelia. They part with mutual assurances of a future meeting.

== Cast ==
- Marie Prevost as Eve Quinn
- Monte Blue as Lewis Dike
- Helene Chadwick as Cornelia Quinn
- John Patrick as Wilfred Meadows
- Lilyan Tashman as Sybil Johnson
- Vera Lewis as Mrs. Quinn
- Carl Miller as Tim Fontanelle
- Mary MacLaren as Mary Robinson
- Arthur Rankin as Clifford Raynes

== Box Office ==
According to Warner Bros., the film earned $224,000 domestically and $37,000 in foreign markets.

== Preservation ==
With no prints of The Dark Swan located in any film archives, it is a lost film.
