= Hogan's Alley (film) =

1925 film

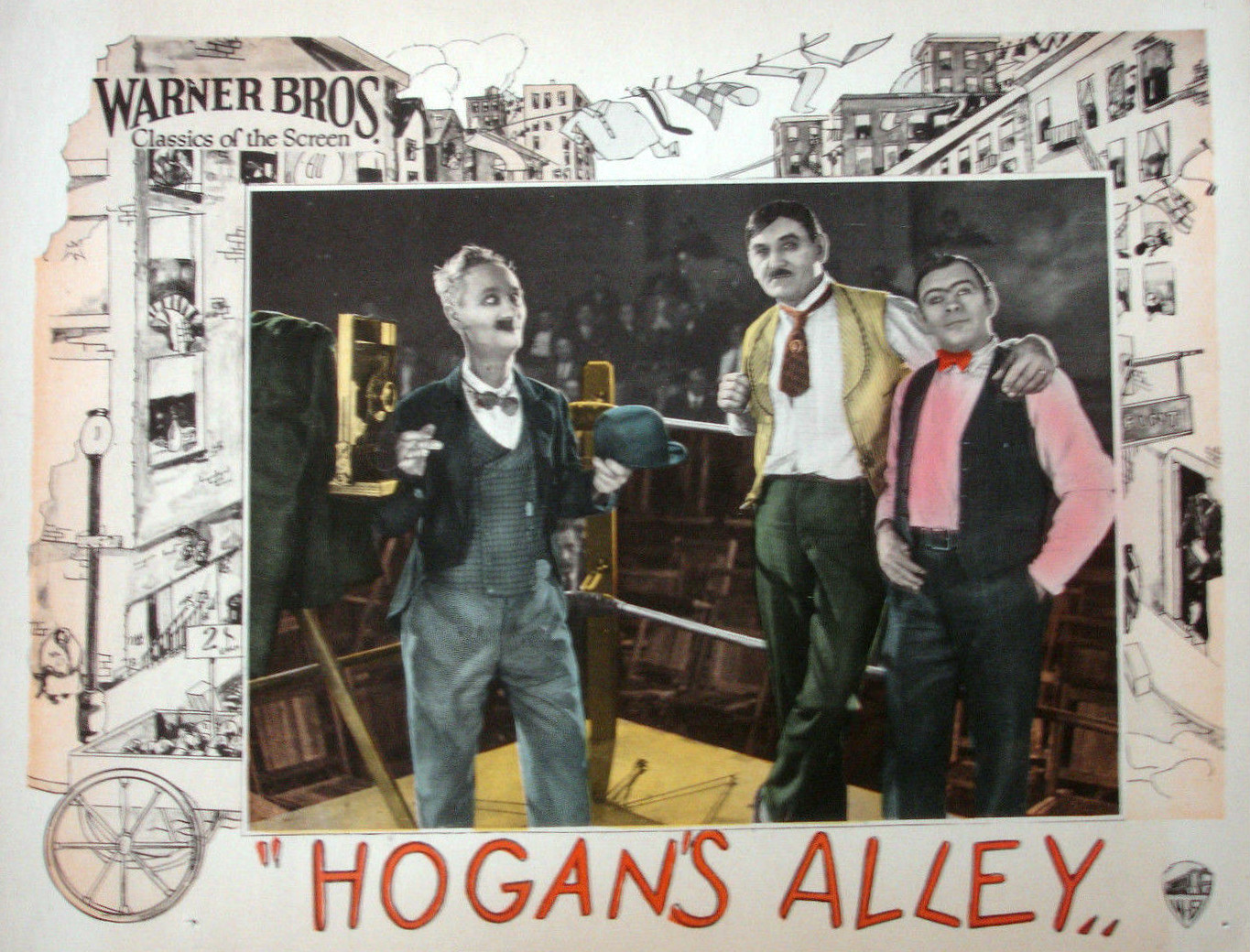
- Hogan's Alley lobby card
- Directed by: Roy Del Ruth
- Written by: Darryl F. Zanuck
- Starring: Monte Blue; Patsy Ruth Miller
- Cinematography: Charles Van Enger
- Edited by: Clarence Kolster
- Production company: Warner Bros.
- Distributed by: Warner Bros.
- Release date: December 12, 1925
- Running time: 7 reels (6,370 feet)
- Country: United States
- Language: Silent (English intertitles)

Hogan's Alley is a 1925 American silent comedy film produced and distributed by Warner Bros. It was an early directing assignment for Roy Del Ruth and starred Monte Blue, Patsy Ruth Miller, and Ben Turpin. This film is a precursor to the silent film One Round Hogan, a later Monte Blue boxing vehicle.

== Plot ==
As described in a review in a film magazine, Patsy is the scrappy little daughter of an ignorant lazy Irishman who lives in Hogan's Alley. Her sweetheart Lefty O'Brien is a prize-fighter, but this does not suit her father who wants her to marry a rich man. Lefty is arrested when his opponent in the fight fails to regain consciousness.

Patsy is hurt and Lefty calls Dr. Franklin, a swell doctor who takes a shine to Patsy and invites her and her father to his lodge. He proves to be a villain who attempts to sweep her off her feet.

Lefty follows their train but his car is wrecked by the locomotive. With Patsy now on a runaway train, Lefty hires an airplane and transfers from it to the train, knocks out the villain, and stops the engine just before it runs into a landslide.

== Cast ==
- Monte Blue as Lefty O'Brien
- Patsy Ruth Miller as Patsy Ryan
- Willard Louis as Michael Ryan
- Louise Fazenda as Dolly
- Ben Turpin as A stranger
- Heinie Conklin as The stranger's friend
- Max Davidson as Clothier
- Herbert Spencer Griswold as The Texas Kid
- Frank Hagney as Battling Savage
- Nigel Barrie as Dr. Emmett Franklin
- Mary Carr as Mother Ryan
- Frank Bond as Al Murphy

== Preservation status ==
Hogan's Alley survives in an incomplete or abridged version in the French archive Centre national du cinéma et de l'image animée in Fort de Bois-d'Arcy.

== See also ==
- List of boxing films
