= Brass (film) =

1923 film by Sidney Franklin

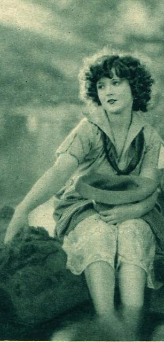
- Marie Prevost in Brass
- Directed by: Sidney Franklin
- Written by: Julien Josephson; Sada Cowan (titles)
- Based on: Brass (1921 novel) Charles Gilman Norris
- Produced by: Harry Rapf
- Starring: Monte Blue; Marie Prevost; Irene Rich
- Cinematography: Norbert Brodine
- Edited by: Hal C. Kern
- Production company: Warner Bros.
- Distributed by: Warner Bros.
- Release date: March 4, 1923
- Running time: 9 reels
- Country: United States
- Language: Silent (English intertitles)
- Budget: $170,000
- Box office: $479,000

Brass is a 1923 American silent romantic drama film produced and distributed by Warner Bros. It was directed by Sidney A. Franklin. This movie stars Monte Blue, Marie Prevost, and Irene Rich. The well-regarded film survives in 16mm format.

== Plot ==
As described in a film magazine review, a young man born in the country leaves his family farm to engage in business in the city. He marries for the first time when he is still very young, finds the match a failure, gets a divorce, and starts life again. The hopelessness of life as far as a happy marriage is concerned forces itself on the young man, whose only brief period of happiness was enjoyed when he was living with a woman who really loves him and sacrifices for him.

== Cast ==
- Monte Blue as Philip Baldwin
- Marie Prevost as Marjorie Jones
- Irene Rich as Mrs. Grotenberg
- Harry Myers as Wilbur Lansing
- Frank Keenan as Frank Church
- Helen Ferguson as Rosemary Church
- Pat O'Malley as Harry Baldwin
- Miss DuPont as Lucy Baldwin
- Ethel Grey Terry as Leila Vale
- Margaret Seddon as Mrs. Baldwin
- Edward Jobson as Judge Baldwin
- Cyril Chadwick as Roy North
- Vera Lewis as Mrs. Jones
- Harvey Clark as George Yost
- Gertrude Bennett as Mrs. Yost
- Bruce Guerin as Baby Paul

== Box office ==
According to Warner Bros. records the film earned $451,000 domestically and $28,000 in foreign markets.

== Preservation status ==
Brass survives complete. It was transferred onto 16mm film by Associated Artists Productions in the 1950s and shown on television.
