= One-Round Hogan =

1927 film by Howard Bretherton

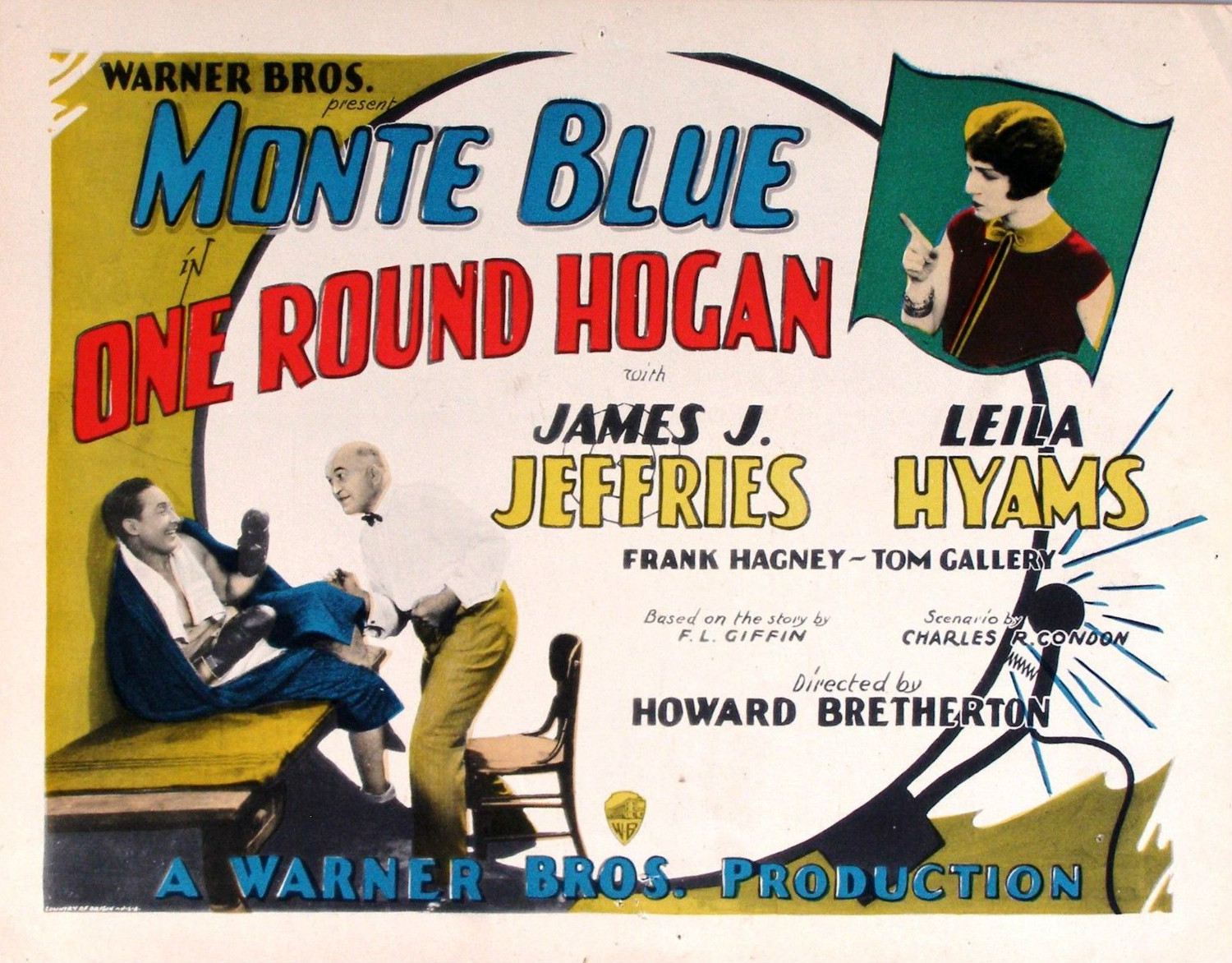
- Lobby card
- Directed by: Howard Bretherton
- Written by: Charles R. Condon (scenario)
- Story by: F. L. Giffen; George Godfrey
- Starring: Monte Blue; Leila Hyams
- Cinematography: Norbert Brodine
- Music by: Vitaphone music score and sound effects
- Production company: Warner Bros.
- Distributed by: Warner Bros.
- Release date: September 17, 1927 (US ltd.)
- Running time: 71 minutes
- Country: United States
- Languages: Sound (Synchronized) (English Intertitles)

One-Round Hogan is a lost 1927 American synchronized sound boxing-drama film produced and distributed by Warner Bros. and directed by Howard Bretherton. While the film has no audible dialog, it was released with a synchronized musical score with sound effects using the Vitaphone sound-on-disc process. The film starred Monte Blue and Leila Hyams. Blue also appears in the 1925 predecessor called Hogan's Alley, written by Darryl F. Zanuck.

Turn of the 20th century boxing champ James J. Jeffries had a featured role in this movie.

== Plot ==
Robert Emmet Hogan, the son of famed pugilist Tim Hogan, has earned the nickname "One Round Hogan" for his uncanny ability to knock out opponents in the first round. His close friend Ed Davis aspires to enter the boxing world himself. However, Ed's sister Helen Davis despises the prize ring lifestyle and pleads with Ed to give up his fighting ambitions.

To win Helen's approval, Ed convinces Robert to pose as a respectable businessman rather than a boxer when they meet Helen. Helen is instantly taken with the charming and polite "businessman," but her affection turns to scorn when she later recognizes him as the feared champion "One Round Hogan" from newspaper photos. Despite Robert's efforts to regain her trust, Helen views boxing as a brutal and dishonorable sport.

Meanwhile, Ed's manager, the unscrupulous "Big Joe" Morgan, sees great potential in Ed as a fighter and pushes him aggressively toward a big fight. Morgan's ambition blinds him to Ed's readiness or safety, and he orchestrates a dirty trick—drugging Ed's scheduled opponent Herman Lecky so the fight cannot proceed. To pacify the angry crowd demanding a match, the promoter is forced to substitute Ed against Robert Hogan.

Though reluctant to fight his friend, Robert agrees to the match only if Ed promises to quit boxing if he is knocked out in the first round. The fight is a sham—Robert quickly knocks Ed out. In the dressing room, an enraged Morgan assaults the defeated Ed with a brutal punch to the heart, killing him.

Robert is tried for manslaughter but is found innocent. Still wracked with guilt and haunted by Ed's death, Robert vows never to fight again. Helen blames Robert for her brother's demise and refuses to forgive him.

One day, Robert visits the Davis home and finds Morgan forcibly imposing himself on Helen. Enraged, Robert knocks Morgan down with a single punch, but Morgan quickly recovers and savagely beats Robert. Afraid to use his knockout punch again for fear of killing another man, Robert is defenseless.

Morgan taunts Robert and demands he either fight or relinquish the world light heavyweight title. Tim Hogan, proud father and boxing legend, implores his son to fight once more before retiring. Robert reluctantly agrees.

On fight night, Robert is crippled by fear and guilt, allowing Morgan to dominate the first round. The Texas Kid, an arena roustabout who witnessed Morgan's cruelty to Ed, reveals Morgan's murderous attack to Helen. Fueled by righteous anger, Helen rushes to the arena and tells Robert the truth between rounds.

Freed from his fear and guilt, Robert mounts a fierce comeback. He lands a crushing uppercut that floors Morgan for the count. The referee declares Robert the winner, champion still undefeated and victorious.

At home, Tim Hogan displays a portrait of Robert alongside other notable figures in boxing history. Helen expresses a newfound appreciation for Robert's character and perseverance, vowing to wear his ring as a symbol of their relationship.

== Cast ==
- Monte Blue as Robert Emmet Hogan
- Leila Hyams as Helen Davis
- James J. Jeffries as Tim Hogan
- Frank Hagney as "Big Joe" Morgan
- Tom Gallery as Ed Davis
- Texas Kid as himself
- Abdul the Turk as "Sniffy"
- Andy Clark (uncredited)
- Tom Kennedy (uncredited)

== See also ==
- List of early sound feature films (1926–1929)
- List of early Warner Bros. sound and talking features
