= The Lover of Camille =

1924 film by Harry Beaumont

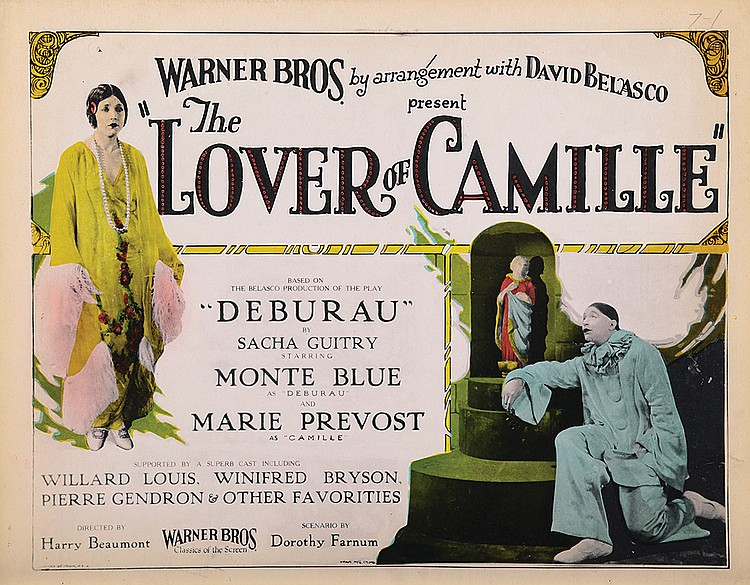
- Lobby card
- Directed by: Harry Beaumont
- Written by: Dorothy Farnum
- Based on: Deburau by Sacha Guitry
- Starring: Monte Blue; Willard Louis; Marie Prevost
- Cinematography: David Abel
- Music by: Mischa Guterson
- Production company: Warner Bros.
- Distributed by: Warner Bros.
- Release date: November 16, 1924 (United States)
- Running time: 80 minutes
- Country: United States
- Language: Silent (English intertitles)

The Lover of Camille is a 1924 American silent romantic drama film directed by Harry Beaumont, and starring Monte Blue. The film was based on the French play Deburau by Sacha Guitry, which was also adapted into a Broadway play by Harley Granville-Barker.

== Plot ==
As described in a review in a film magazine, Jean Gaspard Deburau, the clown of a pantomime theatre in Paris, is the idol of the populace. In a box is an attractive woman who waits for him after the show. Immediately he falls in love with her. After a time he return to find his own wife has left him for his friend Robillard. To the woman, Marie, Deburau's love has been but a passing thing, and returning to her he finds her in the arms of a wealthy fellow, Armand. Disillusioned, he quits the stage, finding a little happiness in his son Charles.

Years pass, Deburau clings to the idea Marie will return, and finally she does, broken in health, telling him Armand has left her. She pleads that he return to the stage, 111 °F with fever, she becomes delirious and Deburau marries her while she thinks he is Armand. At the first performance he breaks down because of his sorrow, and Marie dies. Hiding his broken heart, he dresses his son as the clown and finds some happiness in seeing him acclaimed by the populace.

== Cast ==
- Monte Blue as Jean-Gaspard Deburau
- Willard Louis as Robillard
- Pat Moore as Charles Deburau, Age 10
- Pierre Gendron as Charles Deburau, Age 17
- Carl Miller as Armand Duval
- Rosa Rosanova as Madame Rabouir
- Marie Prevost as Marie Duplessis
- Winifred Bryson as 'The Unknown'
- Brandon Hurst as Bertrand
- Rose Dione as Madame Deburau
- Trilby Clark as Madame Rubard

== Preservation ==
A print of The Lover of Camille is preserved at the Filmarchiv Austria (Wien).
