= Marie Prevost =

Canadian actress (1896–1937)

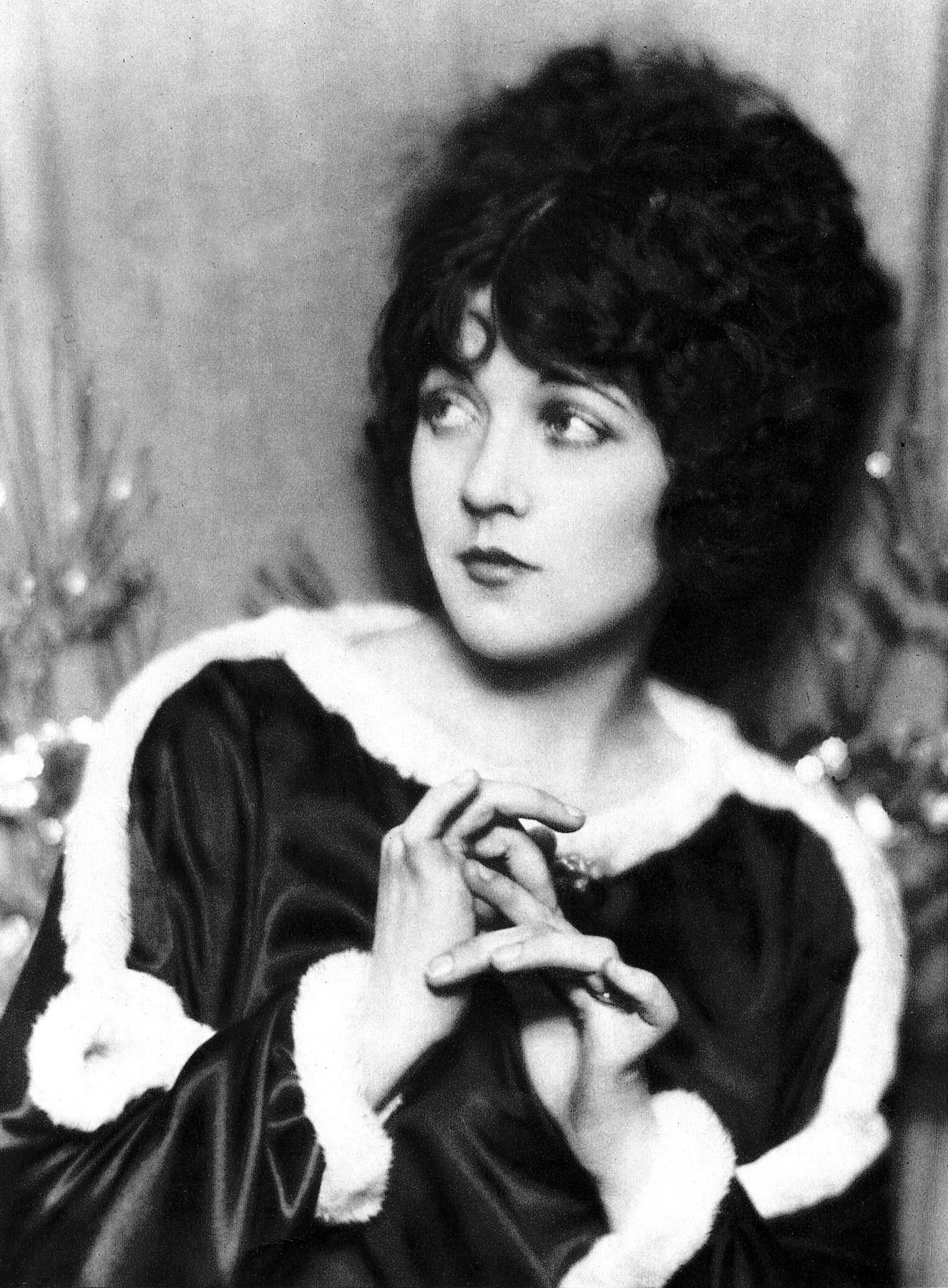
- Prevost c. 1921
- Born: Mary Bickford Dunn; November 8, 1896; Sarnia, Ontario, Canada
- Died: January 21, 1937 (aged 40); Los Angeles, California, U.S.
- Other names: Mary Prevost; Marie Provost
- Occupation: Actress
- Years active: 1915–1936
- Spouses: Sonny Gerke (m. 1918; div. 1923) Kenneth Harlan (m. 1924; div. 1929)

Marie Prevost (born Mary Bickford Dunn; November 8, 1896 – January 21, 1937) was a Canadian film actress. During her 20-year career, she made 121 silent and sound films.

Prevost began her career during the silent film era. She was discovered by Mack Sennett who signed her to contract and made her one of his "Bathing Beauties" in the late 1910s. Prevost appeared in dozens of Sennett's short comedy films before moving on to feature-length films for Universal. In 1922, she signed with Warner Bros. where her career flourished as a leading lady. She was a favorite of director Ernst Lubitsch who cast her in three of his comedy films: The Marriage Circle (1924), Three Women (1924) and Kiss Me Again (1925).

After being let go by Warner Bros in early 1926, Prevost's career began to decline and she was relegated to secondary roles. She was also beset with personal problems, including the death of her mother in 1926 and the breakdown of her marriage to actor Kenneth Harlan in 1927, which fueled her depression. She began to abuse alcohol and binge eat, resulting in a weight gain that made it difficult for her to secure acting jobs. By 1935, Prevost was only able to secure bit parts in films. She made her last onscreen appearance in 1936.

After years of drinking, Prevost died of acute alcoholism at the age of 40 in January 1937. Prevost's estate was valued at $300. Her death prompted the Hollywood community to create the Motion Picture & Television Country House and Hospital.

== Early life ==
Prevost was born in Sarnia, Ontario, to Hughina Marion (née Bickford) and Arthur "Teddy" Dunn. Her father worked as a railway conductor. When she was an infant, Teddy Dunn was killed when gas seeped into the St. Clair Tunnel. Hughina later married Frank Prevost and the family moved to Denver. In 1900, Hughina gave birth to another daughter, Marjorie, called Peg. Marie's stepfather, who worked as a miner and surveyor, frequently moved the family around the country following up on various get-rich-quick schemes. After living in Ogden, Utah; Reno, Nevada; and Fresno, California, the family finally settled in Los Angeles. Hughina and Frank Prevost later divorced. Frank Prevost died in September 1933 and bequeathed Marie $1.

While living in Los Angeles, Prevost attended Manual Arts High School. By 1915, Prevost landed a job as a secretary at a law firm which represented the Keystone Film Company. While running an office errand at the Keystone Studios, Prevost was asked to appear in a bit part for the film His Father's Footsteps. Mack Sennett, Keystone's owner, was impressed by Prevost's performance and sent word that he wanted to see Prevost in his office. Prevost later recalled the day to Motion Picture World magazine: "I asked for Mr. Sennett and was ushered in right away. He looked very stern as I walked into his office. I was ready to cry. Suddenly, he smiled. 'I want your signature today. Sign right here.' I suddenly realized the paper he pushed in front of me was a contract. I was to be one of his Sennett Bathing Beauties. Best of all I was to be paid $15 a week. I signed without reading a word. Fifteen dollars was a lot of money."

As her career was beginning to rise, Prevost married socialite Henry Charles "Sonny" Gerke in June 1918. The couple soon separated, and Prevost kept news of the marriage a secret.

== Career ==
=== Early years ===
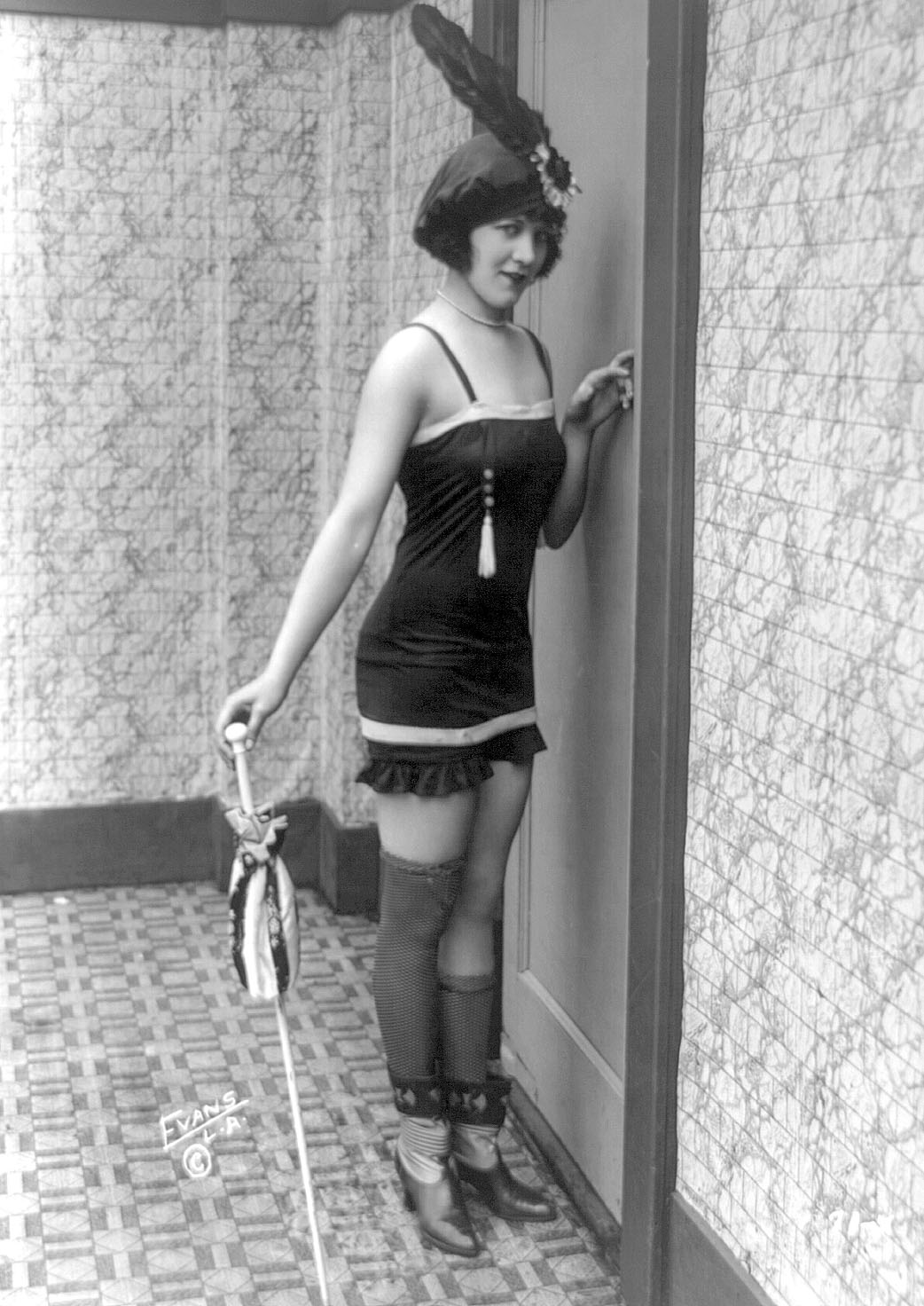
c. 1918

Initially cast in minor comedic roles as the sexy, innocent young girl, she worked in numerous films for Sennett's studio. In 1919, Sennett cast Prevost in her first lead role in Yankee Doodle in Berlin. The film was a hit and helped to solidify Prevost's career. She scored another success in the 1920 romantic film Love, Honor, and Behave, opposite George O'Hara, another newcomer and Sennett protégé. By 1921, Prevost wanted to move to another studio, later stating that she left Keystone because Sennett was only interested in making money and was unconcerned with creativity. Director King Baggot helped secure her a contract with Universal for $1,000 per week. Prevost was released from her contract with Keystone, and she signed with Universal in 1921.

At Universal, Irving Thalberg took an interest in Prevost and became determined to make her a star. Thalberg ensured that she received a great deal of publicity and staged numerous events which put her in the public spotlight. After announcing that he had selected two films in which Prevost would star, The Moonlight Follies (1921) and Kissed (1922), Thalberg sent Prevost to Coney Island where she burned her bathing suit to symbolize the end of her bathing beauty days.

=== Stardom ===
While at Universal, Prevost still was relegated to light comedies. After her contract expired, Jack L. Warner signed her to a two-year contract at $1,500 per week at Warner Bros. in 1922. During this time, Prevost was dating actor Kenneth Harlan. Jack Warner also had signed Harlan to a contract and cast the couple in the lead roles in F. Scott Fitzgerald's The Beautiful and Damned. To publicize the film, Warner announced that the couple would marry on the film's set. The publicity stunt worked, and thousands of fans sent gifts and letters to the couple. In August 1923, Sonny Gerke, Prevost's first husband filed for divorce. The Los Angeles Mirror got wind that Prevost still was married and ran a story with the headline "Marie Prevost Will Be a Bigamist if She Marries Kenneth Harlan". Warner was livid over the negative publicity and Prevost's failure to disclose her first marriage despite the fact that the publicity stunt was his idea.

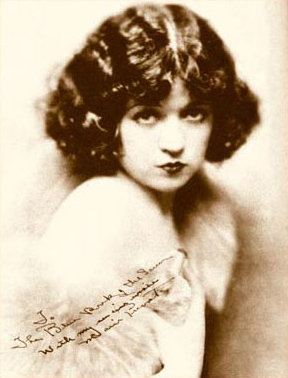
c. 1923

In spite of the bad publicity, Prevost's performance in The Beautiful and Damned brought good reviews. Director Ernst Lubitsch chose her for a major role opposite Adolphe Menjou in 1924's The Marriage Circle. Of her performance as the beautiful seductress, Lubitsch said that she was one of the few actresses in Hollywood who knew how to underplay comedy to achieve the maximum effect. This performance, praised by The New York Times, resulted in Lubitsch casting her in Three Women in 1924 and in Kiss Me Again the following year.

Marie Prevost singing "If I Had My Way" in the film The Flying Fool

In early 1926, Warner Bros. decided to not renew Prevost and Harlan's contracts (the two quietly married in 1924 after Prevost's divorce was finalized). Shortly after she was dismissed by Warner Bros., Prevost's mother Hughina died in an automobile accident in Lordsburg, New Mexico, on February 5, 1926. Hughina had been traveling to Palm Beach, Florida, with actress Vera Steadman and Hollywood studio owner Al Christie when their vehicle overturned. Hughina was crushed by the vehicle and died at the scene. Steadman and Christie sustained serious injuries, but survived.

Actress Phyllis Haver, who had been friends with Prevost since her bathing beauty days, later stated in an interview that she believed the loss of Prevost's and Harlan's contracts with Warner Bros. caused problems in the marriage and was one of the causes of Prevost's alcoholism.

=== Decline ===
Devastated by the loss of her mother, Prevost began drinking heavily. She tried to get past her personal torment by burying herself in her work, starring in numerous roles as a temptress who in the end was always the honorable heroine. Adding to her alcoholism and depression was the end of her marriage to Kenneth Harlan – the two separated in 1927.

After seeing Prevost in The Beautiful and Damned, Howard Hughes cast her as the lead in The Racket (1928). Hughes and Prevost later had a brief affair, which left her heartbroken and further depressed. Her role in The Racket proved to be Prevost's last leading role.

Prevost's depression led to binge eating, resulting in significant weight gain. Her career continued but she was relegated to secondary roles. In 1929, Cecil B. DeMille offered her a co-starring role in his final silent film The Godless Girl, starring Lina Basquette. In her 1990 autobiography, Basquette recalled that Prevost was not outwardly bitter about losing her leading lady status, stating "Aw, hell, that's the way it is." Prevost received generally good reviews for her role in the film. The following year, she signed a contract with Metro-Goldwyn-Mayer.

While at MGM, Prevost worked steadily but was offered only secondary parts. In 1930, she appeared in Paid, starring Joan Crawford, garnering good reviews. In 1931, she played Academy Award winner Helen Hayes' loyal friend in The Sin of Madelon Claudet. In 1932, she was one of the three leads in the film Three Wise Girls, starring Jean Harlow. By 1934, she had no work at all, and her financial situation deteriorated dramatically. The downward spiral became aggravated when her weight problems forced her into repeated crash dieting to even get bit parts. Prevost made her last on-screen appearance as a waitress in Ten Laps to Go (1936).

== Personal life ==
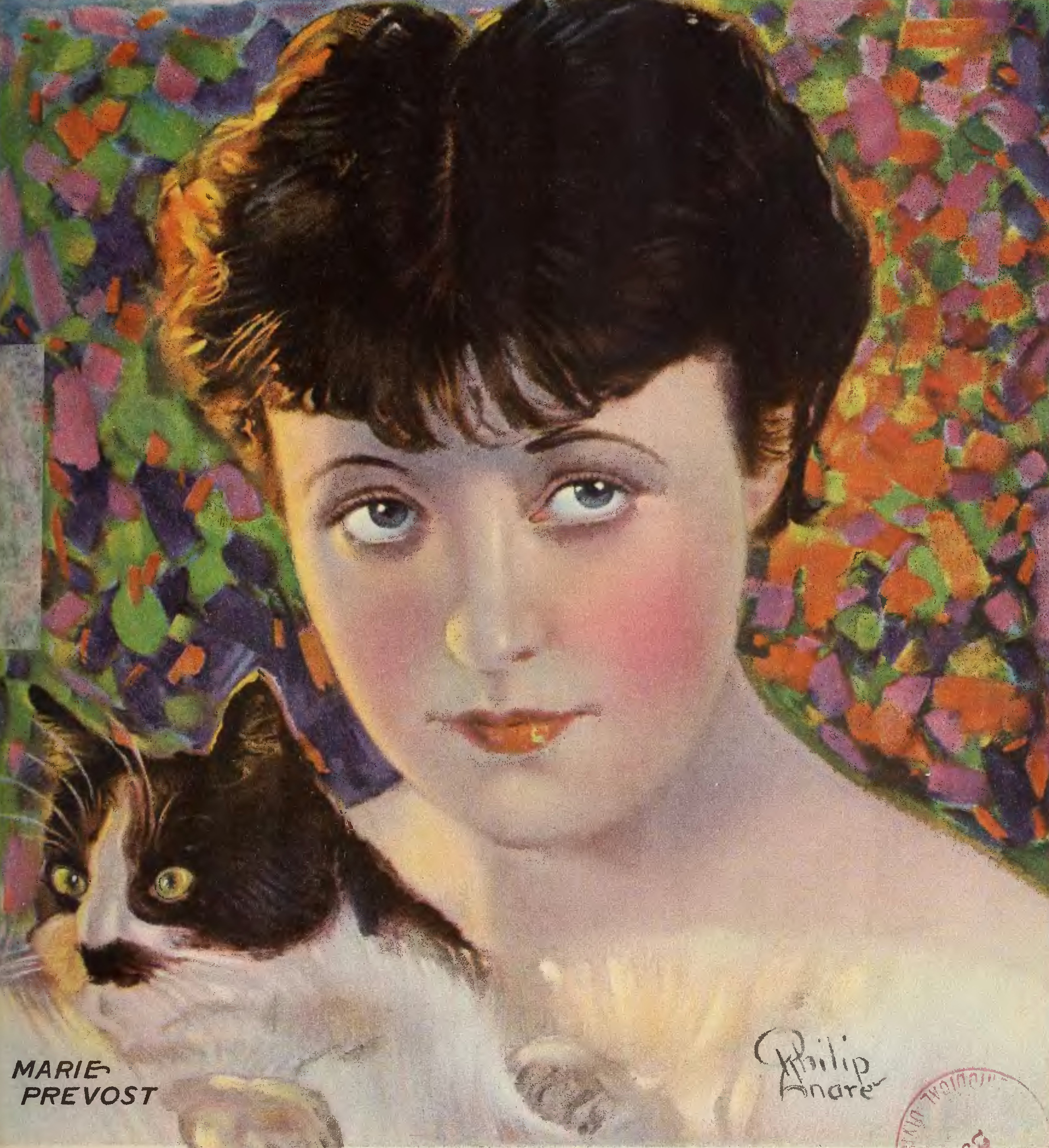
Marie Prevost in 1926 cover art from Picture-Play Magazine

Prevost was married twice, with both marriages ending in divorce. She first wed socialite Henry Charles "Sonny" Gerke, in June 1918. The marriage was not known to the public until Gerke filed for divorce in August 1923, citing desertion. Gerke claimed that the marriage was kept a secret because Prevost feared it would damage her budding acting career. News of the marriage was revealed shortly after Jack L. Warner devised a publicity stunt in which he claimed that Prevost and her The Beautiful and Damned co-star Kenneth Harlan would marry on the film's set in real life. To avoid negative publicity, Prevost did not fight the divorce. In an interview with the Los Angeles Times, Prevost admitted that she and Gerke married on a whim and had separated shortly after marrying. She also stated that she and Gerke had remained friendly and dated on occasion. Gerke's divorce petition was granted in October 1923.

In October 1924, Prevost married actor Kenneth Harlan. The two starred in several films together, including The Beautiful and the Damned and Bobbed Hair. Prevost and Harlan separated in May 1927, and Prevost filed for divorce. Later that year, she was granted an interlocutory divorce. However, the couple reconciled in June 1928. The reconciliation proved to be brief and their divorce was finalized in January 1929.

== Death ==
Prevost died on January 21, 1937, at the age of 40, evidently from the combination of acute alcoholism and malnutrition stemming from anorexia nervosa. Her body was not discovered until January 23 after neighbors complained about her dog's incessant barking. A houseboy found her body after entering her room. Police found several empty liquor bottles in the room along with a promissory note to Joan Crawford for $110.

Her funeral (which was paid for by Joan Crawford) at the Hollywood Memorial Cemetery was attended by Crawford, Clark Gable, Wallace Beery, Douglas Fairbanks Jr., Mack Sennett, and Barbara Stanwyck. Prevost's sister had her remains cremated and combined them with those of their mother, who had died in 1926.

In February 1937, it was discovered that Prevost's estate was valued at $300. Prevost's fate as well as that of others prompted the Hollywood community to create the Motion Picture & Television Country House and Hospital to provide medical care for employees of the television and motion picture industry.

On February 8, 1960, Prevost was honored for her contribution to the motion picture industry with a star on the Hollywood Walk of Fame at 6211 Hollywood Boulevard.

== Filmography ==
Year	Title	Role	Notes
1915	Those Bitter Sweets		Short subject
1915	His Father's Footsteps		Short subject
1916	Unto Those Who Sin	Celeste	
1918	His Hidden Purpose	The Girl in the Case	Short subject
1918	Her Screen Idol		Short subject
1919	East Lynne with Variations	The Girl	Short subject Lost film
1919	Uncle Tom Without a Cabin	Eliza	Short subject Lost film
1919	Yankee Doodle in Berlin	Belgian Girl	
1919	Salome vs. Shenandoah	Ingenue Actress	Lost film
1920	Down on the Farm	The Faithful Wife	
1920	Love, Honor and Behave	The Newlywed	Lost film
1921	A Small Town Idol	Marcelle Mansfield	
1921	Moonlight Follies	Nan Rutledge	Lost film
1921	Nobody's Fool	Polly Gordon	Lost film
1921	A Parisian Scandal	Liane-Demarest	Lost film
1922	Don't Get Personal	Patricia Parker	Lost film
1922	The Dangerous Little Demon	Teddy Harmon	Lost film
1922	Kissed	Constance Keener	
1922	The Married Flapper	Pamela Billings	Lost film
1922	Her Night of Nights	Molly May Mahone	Lost film
1922	The Beautiful and Damned	Gloria	Lost film
1922	Heroes of the Street	Betty Benton	
1923	Brass	Marjorie Jones	
1923	Red Lights	Ruth Carson	Lost film
1923	The Wanters	Myra Hastings	Lost film
1924	The Marriage Circle	Mizzi Stock	
1924	Tarnish	Nettie Dark	Lost film
1924	How to Educate a Wife	Mabel Todd	Lost film
1924	Daughters of Pleasure	Marjory Hadley	Alternative title: Beggar on Horseback; Incomplete film, with two of its six reels missing
1924	Cornered	Mary Brennan / Margaret Waring	Lost film
1924	Three Women	Harriet	
1924	Being Respectable	Valerie Winship	Lost film
1924	The Dark Swan	Eve Quinn	Lost film
1924	The Lover of Camille	Marie Duplessis	
1925	Kiss Me Again	LouLou Fleury	Lost film
1925	Bobbed Hair	Connemara Moore	
1925	Seven Sinners	Molly Brian	
1925	Recompense	Julie Gmelyn	Lost film
1926	For Wives Only	Laura Rittenhaus	Lost film
1926	Other Women's Husbands	Kay Lambert	Lost film
1926	Almost a Lady	Marcia Blake	
1926	His Jazz Bride	Gloria Gregory	Lost film
1926	The Caveman	Myra Gaylord	Incomplete film, with a copy surviving with a reel missing
1926	Nana	Gaga	Uncredited
1926	Up in Mabel's Room	Mabel Ainsworth	
1927	Getting Gertie's Garter	Gertie Darling	
1927	The Night Bride	Cynthia Stockton	Lost film
1927	Man Bait	Madge Dreyer	Lost film
1927	The Girl in the Pullman	Hazel Burton	
1928	On to Reno	Vera	Lost film
1928	A Blonde for a Night	Marcia Webster	
1928	The Sideshow	Queenie Parker	
1928	The Racket	Helen Hayes	
1928	The Rush Hour	Margie Dolan	
1929	All Faces West	Arleta Vance	Lost film
1929	The Godless Girl	Mame - The Other Girl	
1929	The Flying Fool	Pat Riley	
1929	Divorce Made Easy	Mabel Deering	
1930	Party Girl	Diana Hoster	
1930	Ladies of Leisure	Dot Lamar	
1930	War Nurse	Rosalie	
1930	Sweethearts on Parade	Nita	
1930	Paid	Agnes Lynch	
1931	Gentleman's Fate	Mabel	
1931	It's a Wise Child	Annie Ostrom	
1931	Sporting Blood	Angela 'Angie' Ludeking	
1931	The Runaround	Margy	
1931	The Good Bad Girl	Trixie Barnes	
1931	The Sin of Madelon Claudet	Rosalie Lebeau	
1931	Hell Divers	Mrs. Lulu Farnsworth	
1931	Reckless Living	Alice	
1932	Three Wise Girls	Dot	
1932	Slightly Married	Nellie Gordon	
1932	Carnival Boat	Babe	
1933	Parole Girl	Jeanie Vance	
1933	The Eleventh Commandment	Tessie Florin	
1933	Only Yesterday	Amy	Uncredited
1935	Keystone Hotel	Mrs. Clarabelle Sterling	Short subject
1935	Hands Across the Table	Nona	
1936	13 Hours by Air	Waitress in Omaha	Producer
1936	Tango	Betty Barlow	
1936	Bengal Tiger	Saloon Girl	Uncredited
1936	Cain and Mabel	Sherman's Receptionist	Uncredited
1936	Ten Laps to Go	Elsie, Cafe Waitress	Alternative title: King of the Speedway

== In popular culture ==
- Prevost's death was featured in the book Hollywood Babylon by Kenneth Anger. In the book, Anger claims Prevost's dog consumed her remains over the ensuing days to survive. However, Anger's claims that Prevost's dog made "mincemeat out of his mistress" are false. While Prevost's pet dachshund Maxie did bite her legs in an effort to wake her, the dog did not attempt to eat her body.
- Nick Lowe's song "Marie Provost" (sic) from the 1978 album Jesus of Cool details her life and Anger's account of her death. The song includes the lyric in the chorus "She was a winner/that became the doggie's dinner". The song references the date July 29, which is now known amongst Lowe's fans as 'Marie Prevost Day'.
- In 2019, novelist Laini Giles released Bathing Beauty, a novel that details Prevost's life.

== See also ==
- Canadian pioneers in early Hollywood
