= Kiss Me Again (1925 film) =

1925 film by Ernst Lubitsch

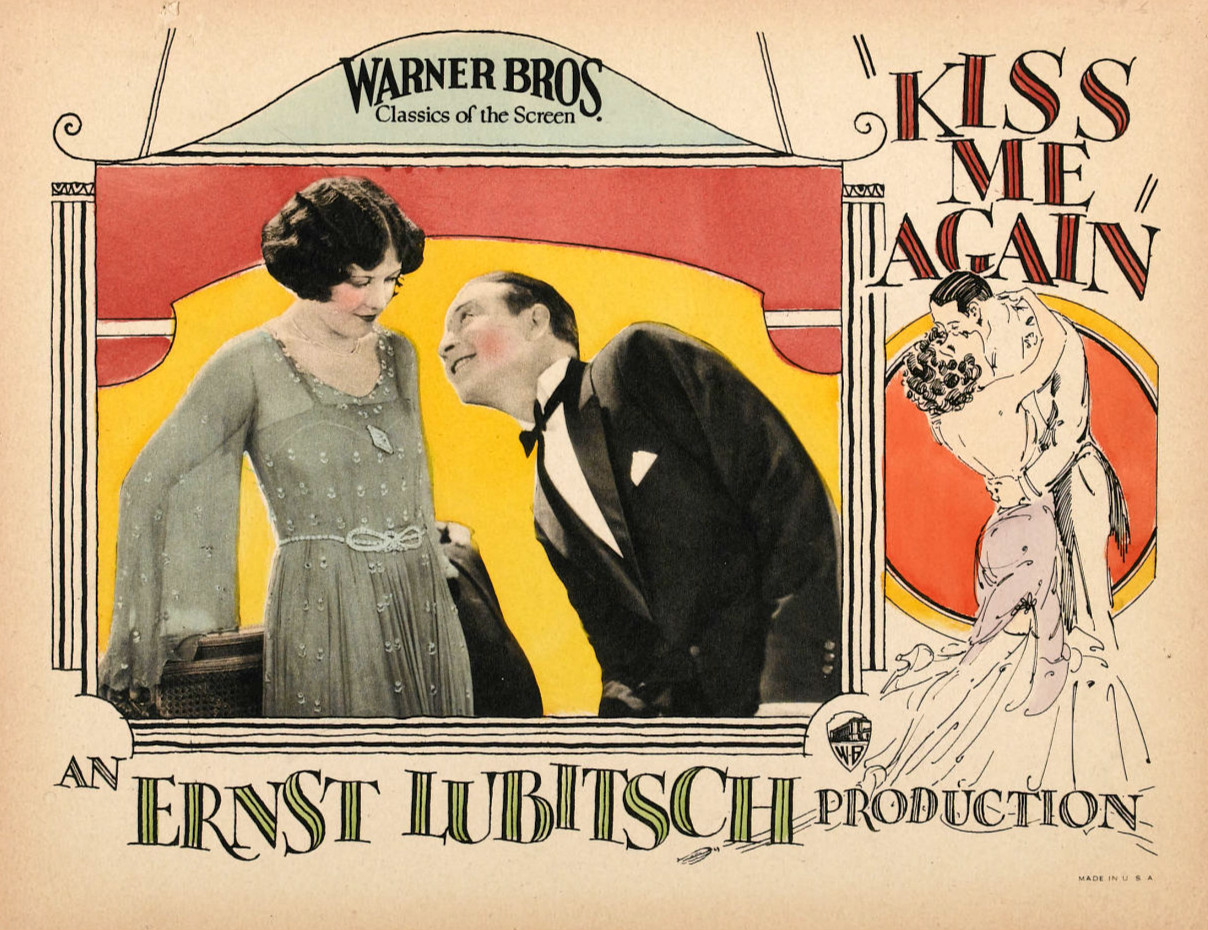
- Lobby card
- Directed by: Ernst Lubitsch
- Screenplay by: Hanns Kräly
- Based on: Divorçons! by Victorien Sardou and Émile de Najac
- Starring: Marie Prevost; Monte Blue; Clara Bow
- Cinematography: Charles Van Enger
- Production company: Warner Bros.
- Distributed by: Warner Bros.
- Release date: August 1, 1925 (US)
- Running time: 7 reels
- Country: United States
- Language: Silent (English intertitles)
- Budget: $224,000
- Box office: $394,000

Kiss Me Again is a 1925 American silent romantic comedy film directed by Ernst Lubitsch. It stars Marie Prevost, Monte Blue, and Clara Bow. The film was based on the French play Divorçons! (1880), by Victorien Sardou and Émile de Najac, and the adapted version of the play Cyprienne.

== Plot ==
As described in a film magazine review, infatuated with her music teacher, LouLou decides to leave her husband. Her husband takes a room at the club. When the time for the divorce arrives, the husband returns home to get his clothes and his wife persuades him to stay. She has suspected him of having another woman and is disgusted by the "other man."

== Cast ==
- Marie Prevost as LouLou Fleury
- Monte Blue as Gaston Fleury
- John Roche as Maurice
- Clara Bow as Grizette
- Willard Louis as Dr. DuBois

== Box office ==
According to Warner Bros records, the film earned $318,000 domestically and $76,000 in foreign markets.

== Preservation ==
The film is now considered lost. Warner Bros. records of the film's negative have a notation, "Junked 12/27/48" (i.e., December 27, 1948). Warner Bros. destroyed many of its negatives in the late 1940s and 1950s due to nitrate film pre-1933 decomposition. No copies of Kiss Me Again are known to exist.

== See also ==
- List of lost films
