= The Flying Fool (1929 film) =

1929 film by Tay Garnett

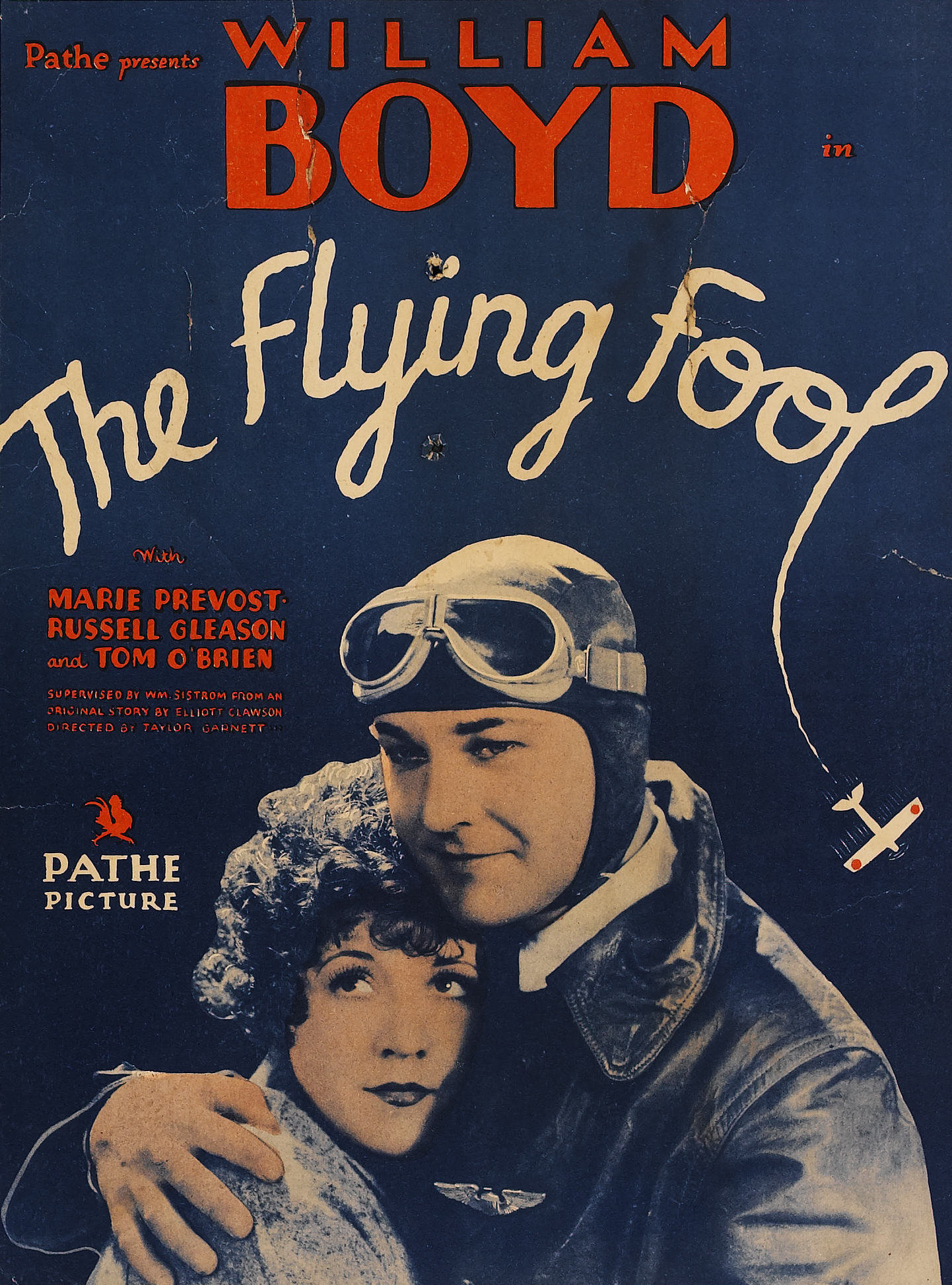
- Window card poster
- Directed by: Tay Garnett
- Written by: Tay Garnett (scenario); James Gleason (dialogue)
- Based on: Original story by Elliott J. Clawson
- Starring: William Boyd; Russell Gleason; Marie Prevost
- Cinematography: Arthur C. Miller
- Edited by: Claude Berkeley
- Music by: George Green; George Waggner
- Production company: Pathé Studio
- Distributed by: Pathé Exchange
- Release date: June 23, 1929
- Running time: 73 minutes
- Country: United States
- Languages: Silent film English intertitles Sound film version

The Flying Fool is a 1929 American aviation-themed film produced and distributed by Pathé Exchange as both a silent film and sound film just as Hollywood was transitioning to filming with sound. (Note: The sound version used the RCA Photophone system.) Tay Garnett directed and William Boyd, Russell Gleason and Marie Prevost starred.

The Flying Fool (1929)

== Plot ==
After an World War I aerial battle over French lines, Bill Taylor is honoured as an ace. After the war, he continues flying as a barnstormer, known as the "Flying Fool". His kid-brother, Jimmy, is one of his crew. Jimmy falls in love with a nightclub singer, Pat Riley. His older-brother worries that Jimmy may be involved with the wrong kind of girl.

Bill decides to check on Pat out and he finds she is a sweet and home-loving daughter working to provide for her mother. To his surprise, he also falls for her, and this upsets Jimmy.

Both brothers take to their aircraft to decide which of them will win Pat. After a thrilling air "battle," Bill and Jimmy land safely. Pat decides she loves Bill, and Jimmy transfers his affections to another pretty girl.

== Cast ==
- William Boyd as Bill Taylor
- Marie Prevost as Pat Riley
- Tom O'Brien as Tom Dugan
- Russell Gleason as Jimmy Taylor
- Kate Bruce as Mrs. Riley, Pat's Mother
- Dan Wolheim as Airport Manager
- Dorothy Ward as Mae Hopper

== Music ==
The theme song for the film was entitled "If I Had My Way Music" which was composed by George Green and George Waggner. It is sung by Marie Prevost in the film. Also featured on the soundtrack is the sound "I'm That Way About Baby (And She's That Way About Me)" by George Green and George Waggner. This second song is sung by The Biltmore Trio in the film.

== Production ==
According to her journal entry for 1929, aviatrix Pancho Barnes flew in The Flying Fool. Noted stunt pilot Frank Clarke along with his friends, Leon Nomis, Roy Wilson and Dick Rinaldi, also flew in the film.

The shooting locale was the Metropolitan Airport in Los Angeles where two Travel Air 4000 aircraft (one painted white with "The Flying Fool" on its fuselage) were flown.

== Reception ==
Aviation film historian Stephen Pendo, in Aviation in the Cinema (1985) noted The Flying Fool was an "all dialogue" (another catch phrase for a sound film or "talkie". He also wrote, "noted cameraman Arthur Miller lensed the film."

Aviation film historian James Farmer in Celluloid Wings: The Impact of Movies on Aviation (1984) considered The Flying Fool, an example of a film that benefitted from "... excellent aerial sequences."

== See also ==
- List of early sound feature films (1926–1929)
