= One Hour with You =

1932 film

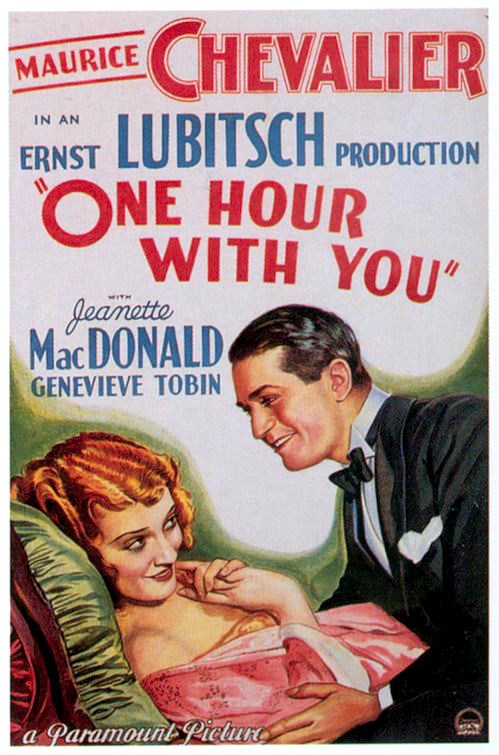
- Theatrical release poster
- Directed by: George Cukor; Ernst Lubitsch
- Written by: Samson Raphaelson
- Based on: Only a Dream; 1909 play by Lothar Schmidt
- Produced by: Ernst Lubitsch
- Starring: Maurice Chevalier; Jeanette MacDonald; Genevieve Tobin
- Cinematography: Victor Milner
- Edited by: William Shea
- Music by: W. Franke Harling; Oscar Straus; Rudolph G. Kopp; John Leipold
- Production company: Paramount Pictures
- Distributed by: Paramount Pictures
- Release date: March 22, 1932 (US)
- Running time: 80 minutes
- Country: United States
- Language: English

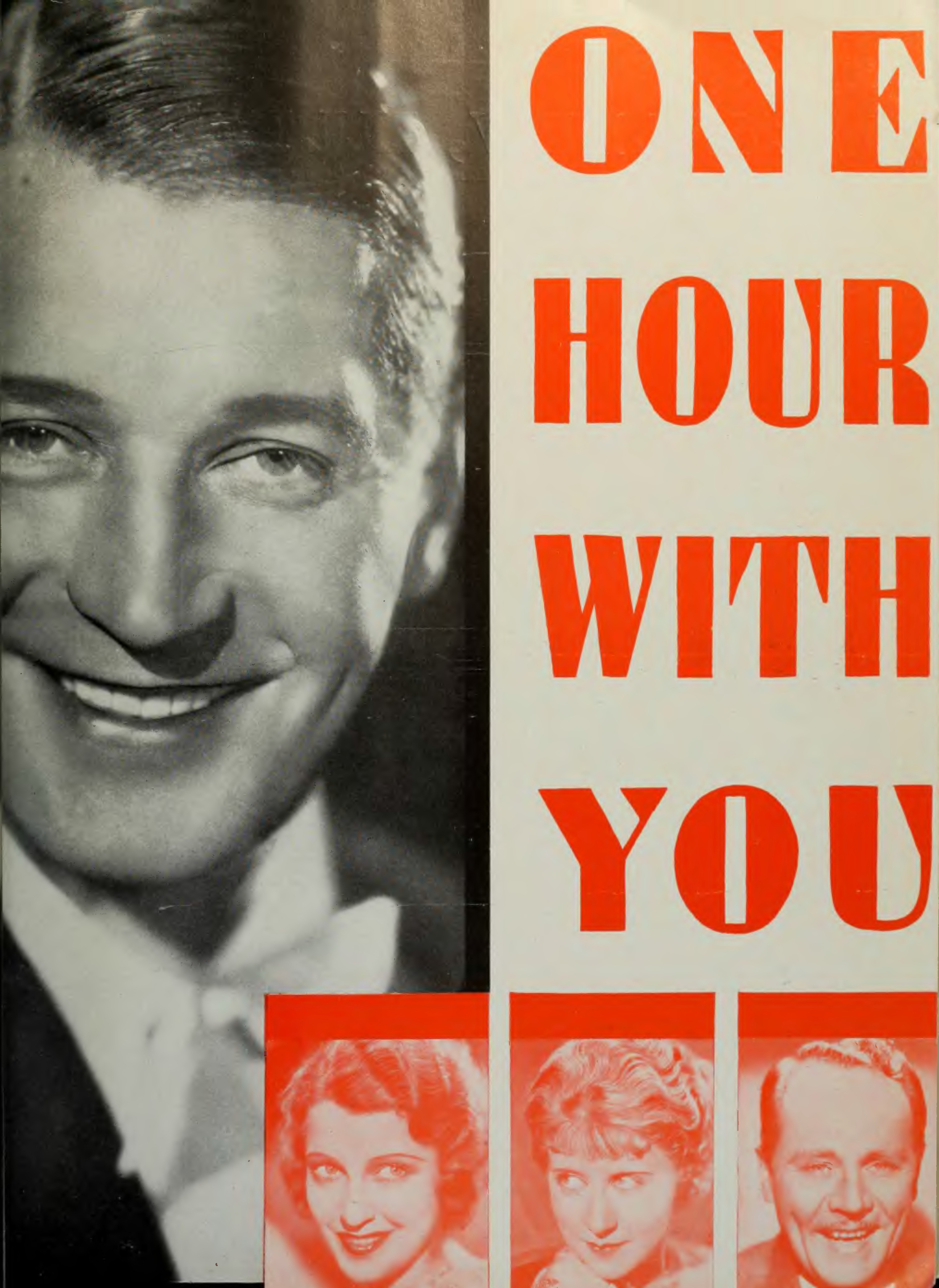
One Hour with You ad in The Film Daily, 1932

One Hour with You is a 1932 American pre-Code musical comedy film about a married couple who are attracted to other people. It was produced and directed by Ernst Lubitsch "with the assistance of" George Cukor, and written by Samson Raphaelson from the play Only a Dream by Lothar Schmidt. It stars Maurice Chevalier, Jeanette MacDonald, Genevieve Tobin, Charlie Ruggles and Roland Young.

The film is a musical remake of The Marriage Circle (1924), the second film that Lubitsch directed in the United States. One Hour with You was nominated for the Academy Award for Best Picture.

The film was preserved by the UCLA Film & Television Archive with its original color tints restored. As a published work from 1932, the film will enter the American public domain on January 1, 2028.

== Plot ==
Parisian doctor Andre Bertier is faithful to his loving wife Colette, much to the surprise of his lovely female patients. But when Colette's best friend Mitzi Olivier insists upon being treated by Dr. Bertier, his devotion is put to the test.

== Cast ==
- Maurice Chevalier as Dr. Andre Bertier
- Jeanette MacDonald as Colette Bertier
- Genevieve Tobin as Mitzi Olivier
- Charles Ruggles as Adolph
- Roland Young as Professor Olivier
- Josephine Dunn as Mademoiselle Martel
- Richard Carle as Henri Dornier, Private Detective
- Barbara Leonard as Mitzi's Maid
- George Barbier as Police Commissioner
- Donald Novis as Crooner
- Charles Coleman as Marcel (uncredited)
- Kent Taylor as Party Guest (uncredited)

Carole Lombard and Kay Francis were the first choices to costar in the film.

== Production ==
Lubitsch was originally scheduled to direct One Hour with You and supervised the project in preproduction, but was unable to direct because his previous film, The Man I Killed, went beyond schedule. George Cukor was instead assigned to direct. Within two weeks after filming had begun, conflicts between Chevalier and Cukor brought Lubitsch back, although Cukor remained on the set. Cukor and Lubitsch each demanded sole credit for directing and the matter was litigated in court. Before a judgment was rendered, Cukor received a credit for assisting the direction and the right to break his contract with Paramount in order to direct What Price Hollywood? at RKO.

A French-language version titled Une heure près de toi was produced simultaneously, with Lili Damita playing Tobin's role.

== Soundtrack ==
Unless otherwise noted, the music is written by Oscar Straus and the lyrics are written by Leo Robin.

- "One Hour with You", music by Richard A. Whiting, performed by the Coconut Orchestra with vocal by Donald Novis, also sung by Genevieve Tobin and Maurice Chevalier, Charlie Ruggles and Jeanette MacDonald, and Chevalier and MacDonald
- "Police Station Number" (uncredited), music by John Leipold
- "We Will Always Be Sweethearts", sung by MacDonald
- "What Would You Do?", sung by Chevalier
- "Oh That Mitzi", sung by Chevalier
- "Three Times a Day", sung by Tobin
- "What a Little Thing Like a Wedding Ring Can Do", sung by Chevalier and MacDonald
- "It Was Only a Dream Kiss", sung by Chevalier and MacDonald

== Reception ==
On the review aggregator website Rotten Tomatoes, 88% of 8 critics' reviews are positive, with an average rating of 7.50/10.
