= Ten Laps to Go =

1938 film

- Directed by: Elmer Clifton
- Screenplay by: Charles R. Condon
- Story by: William Bloecher
- Produced by: Fanchon Royer
- Starring: Rex Lease; Muriel Evans; Duncan Renaldo; Tom Moore; Charles Delaney; Marie Prevost; Yakima Canutt; Eddie Davis; Lloyd Ingraham; Walter McGrail; Gay Seabrook; Lester Dorr
- Cinematography: Arthur Martinelli
- Edited by: Edward Schroeder
- Production company: Fanchon Royer Pictures
- Distributed by: Ace Pictures Corporation
- Release date: December 6, 1936 (US)
- Running time: 60 minutes
- Country: United States
- Language: English

Ten Laps to Go (King of the Speedway) is a 1936 American action/drama film directed by Elmer Clifton. The film stars Rex Lease as a champion race car driver, Duncan Renaldo as his rival, and Muriel Evans as the romantic interest. Former silent film star Marie Prevost has a small role in this film, which would prove to be her last; her death from self-inflicted malnutrition and alcoholism occurred less than six months later.

== Production notes ==
Ten Laps to Go was produced by the independent company Fanchon Royer Pictures and was distributed theatrically under the states-rights system. It has been released on television in the US under the title King of the Speedway.

== Home media ==
Ten Laps to Go was released under its original title from budget DVD companies; it is available from Alpha Video on a double-bill with Go-Get-'Em, Haines.
