= Being Respectable =

1924 film

- Lobby card
- Directed by: Phil Rosen
- Screenplay by: Dorothy Farnum
- Based on: Being Respectable by Grace Hodgson Flandrau
- Starring: Marie Prevost; Monte Blue; Louise Fazenda; Irene Rich; Theodore von Eltz; Frank Currier
- Cinematography: H. Lyman Broening
- Production company: Warner Bros.
- Distributed by: Warner Bros.
- Release date: July 1, 1924
- Running time: 80 minutes
- Country: United States
- Language: English

Being Respectable is a 1924 American drama film directed by Phil Rosen and written by Dorothy Farnum. The film stars Marie Prevost, Monte Blue, Louise Fazenda, Irene Rich, Theodore von Eltz and Frank Currier. The film was released by Warner Bros. on July 1, 1924.

== Plot ==
Charles Carpenter is obliged to marry Suzanne, with pressure from his wealthy and respectable family, although he is in love with young Valerie Winship. Years later, when Valerie is back in town, they renew the affair and Carpenter plans to leave his wife and child for her. In the end he yields to family duty and respectability.

== Cast ==
- Marie Prevost as Valerie Winship
- Monte Blue as Charles Carpenter
- Louise Fazenda as Deborah Carpenter
- Irene Rich as Suzanne Schuyler
- Theodore von Eltz as Stephen O'Connell
- Frank Currier as Darius Carpenter
- Eulalie Jensen as Louise Carpenter
- Lila Leslie as Mrs. Winship
- Sidney Bracey as Philip Deaby
- Charles K. French as Mr. Beasley

== Reception ==
Being Respectable opened with mixed reviews from The New York Times. The New York Times Screen review characterized it as "only mildly interesting in parts, and frequently disappointing.".
