= Charles Van Enger =

American cinematographer (1890–1980)

- Born: August 29, 1890; Port Jervis, New York; United States
- Died: July 4, 1980 (aged 89); Woodland Hills, California; United States
- Occupation: Cinematographer
- Years active: 1920–1966

Charles Van Enger (29 August 1890 – 4 July 1980) was an American cinematographer. In the 1920s Van Enger worked on all the silent films the German director Ernst Lubitsch made for Warner Bros. During the 1930s he worked in the British film industry. His later work was largely on supporting features for Universal Pictures and various independents.

== Partial filmography ==
- The Great Redeemer (1920)
- The Last of the Mohicans (1920)
- The Foolish Matrons (1921)
- Salomé (1923)
- The Christian (1923)
- Broadway After Dark (1924)
- Forbidden Paradise (1924)
- The Marriage Circle (1924)
- Three Women (1924)
- The Phantom of the Opera (1925)
- Kiss Me Again (1925)
- Hogan's Alley (1925)
- Lady Windermere's Fan (1925)
- Why Girls Go Back Home (1926)
- Paradise (1926)
- Puppets (1926)
- Easy Pickings (1927)
- The Sea Tiger (1927)
- The Life of Riley (1927)
- The Port of Missing Girls (1928)
- The Head of the Family (1928)
- One Mad Kiss (1930)
- Meet the Wife (1931)
- Forgotten Women (1931)
- Help Yourself (1932)
- Money Means Nothing (1932)
- Turkey Time (1933)
- I Was a Spy (1933)
- Friday the Thirteenth (1933)
- Aunt Sally (1933)
- Forbidden Territory (1934)
- My Song for You (1934)
- Me and Marlborough (1935)
- In Town Tonight (1935)
- Boys Will Be Boys (1935)
- The Stoker (1935)
- Things Are Looking Up (1935)
- Soft Lights and Sweet Music (1936)
- Ménilmontant (1936)
- Where There's a Will (1936)
- Captain Bill (1936)
- Jack of All Trades (1936)
- The Bureaucrats (1936)
- San Francisco Docks (1940)
- Moonlight in Havana (1942)
- Who Done It? (1942)
- Sherlock Holmes Faces Death (1943)
- Frisco Sal (1945)
- That Night with You (1945)
- White Tie and Tails (1946)
- Abbott and Costello Meet Frankenstein (1948)
- Abbott and Costello Meet the Killer, Boris Karloff (1949)
- The Pecos Pistol (1949)
- Lorna Doone (1951)
- Sitting Bull (1954)
- Captain Kidd and the Slave Girl (1954)
- Khyber Patrol (1954)
- Gun Fever (1958)

== Bibliography ==
- Thompson, Kristin. Herr Lubitch Goes To Hollywood: German and American Film After World War I. Amsterdam University Press, 2005.
