= Arthur Hoyt =

American actor (1874–1953)

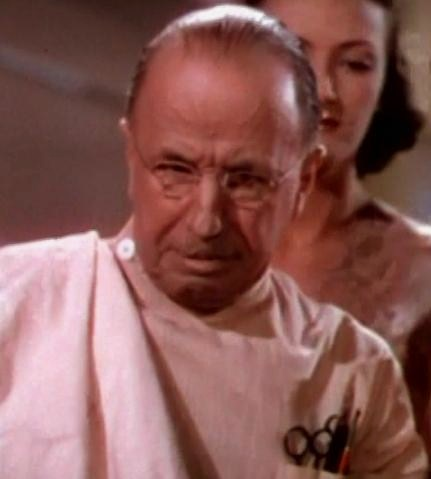
- Hoyt in A Star Is Born (1937)
- Born: March 19, 1874; Georgetown, Colorado, U.S.
- Died: January 4, 1953 (aged 78); Woodland Hills, California, U.S.
- Resting place: Chapel of the Pines Crematory
- Occupation: Actor
- Years active: 1905–1947

Arthur Hoyt (March 19, 1874 – January 4, 1953) was an American film character actor who appeared in more than 275 films in his 34-year film career, about a third of them silent films.

== Career ==
Born in Georgetown, Colorado, in 1874, Hoyt made his Broadway debut in 1905 in The Prince Consort. He also appeared in Ferenc Molnár's The Devil in 1908, and made his final Broadway appearance in The Great Name in 1911.

Hoyt made the silent comedy short The Scrub Lady in 1914, but his film acting career did not begin in earnest until 1916 when he appeared in another short, The Heart of a Show Girl. From that time until 1944, each year a film was released in which Hoyt had acted – and frequently up to a dozen or so. Hoyt had large roles in such silent films as The Four Horsemen of the Apocalypse (1921), Souls for Sale (1923), and The Lost World (1925). He also directed two silent features, Station Content starring Gloria Swanson and High Stakes, and was the casting director for another, Her American Husband, all in 1918.

Arthur Hoyt

Hoyt's final silent film, his 80th, was The Rush Hour (1928), which starred Marie Provost. Unlike her, Hoyt survived the transition to talkies, although he generally played lesser roles such as "a henpecked husband or downtrodden office worker". – and he frequently did not receive screen credit for his performances. His first sound film was 1928's My Man, a musical starring Fanny Brice, and the pace of his work did not slack off in the sound era. He may be best remembered as the motor-court manager who hassles Clark Gable and Claudette Colbert in Frank Capra's It Happened One Night (1934).

In the 1940s, when he was nearing the end of his career, Hoyt was part of Preston Sturges' unofficial "stock company" of character actors, appearing in all the films written and directed by Sturges from 1940 to 1947.

At the age of 70, Hoyt, who was sometimes billed as "Mr. Arthur Hoyt", retired from acting. The last film in which he appeared, The Sin of Harold Diddlebock was filmed in late 1944 and early 1945, although it wasn't released until 1947.

== Death ==
Hoyt died at the Motion Picture Country Home in Woodland Hills, California on 4 January 1953, and is entombed in Chapel of the Pines Crematory at Los Angeles, California.

== Selected filmography ==
Silent

- The Scrub Lady (1914, Short) - James Olcott - a Friend in Need
- The Heart of a Show Girl (1916, Short)
- Love Never Dies (1916) - Monsieur Jarnier
- A Stranger from Somewhere (1916) - Daniel Darling
- The Devil's Bondwoman (1916) - The Alchemist
- The Man Who Took a Chance (1917) - James
- Perils of the Secret Service (1917) - (Episode #5)
- Bringing Home Father (1917) - Pa Swazey
- The Show Down (1917) - Oliver North
- Mr. Opp (1917) - Mr. D. Webster Opp
- Unto the End (1917)
- The Yellow Dog (1918) - Albert Walker
- Cowardice Court (1919) - Lord Cecil Bazelhurst
- The Grim Game (1919) - Dr. Harvey Tyson
- The Triflers (1920) - Charles Lewiston
- The Girl in Number 29 (1920) - Valet
- Nurse Marjorie (1920) - Anthony, Duke of Donegal
- The Desperate Hero (1920) - Whitty
- Trumpet Island (1920) - Henry Caron
- In the Heart of a Fool (1920) - Mortie Sands
- A Slave of Vanity (1920) - Croker Harrington
- The Four Horsemen of the Apocalypse (1921) - Lieut. Schnitz
- Don't Neglect Your Wife (1921) - Ben Travers
- Camille (1921) - Count de Varville
- Red Courage (1921) - Nathan Hitch
- The Foolish Age (1921) - Lester Hicks
- Too Much Wife (1922) - John Coningsby
- Is Matrimony a Failure? (1922) - Mr. Wilbur
- Kissed (1922) - Horace Peabody
- Restless Souls (1922) - Edgar Swetson
- The Top of New York (1922) - Mr. Brady
- The Understudy (1922) - Cathbert Vane
- Love is an Awful Thing (1922) - Harold Wright
- Little Wildcat (1922) - Mr. Wilding
- The Strangers' Banquet (1922) - Morel
- The White Flower (1923) - Gregory Bolton
- Souls for Sale (1923) - Jimmy Leland (uncredited)
- An Old Sweetheart of Mine (1923) - Frederick McCann
- The Love Piker (1923) - Professor Click
- To the Ladies (1923) - Tom Baker
- An Old Sweetheart of Mine (1923)
- Do It Now (1924)
- Daring Youth (1924) - Winston Howell
- When a Man's a Man (1924) - Professor Parkhill
- Bluff (1924) - Algy Henderson
- The Dangerous Blonde (1924) - Mr. Faraday
- Her Marriage Vow (1924) - Winslow
- Sundown (1924) - Henry Crawley
- The Lost World (1925) - Prof. Summerlee
- Head Winds (1925) - Winthrop Van Felt
- The Sporting Venus (1925) - Detective
- Private Affairs (1925) - Alf Stacy
- Any Woman (1925) - Jones
- Eve's Lover (1925) - Amos Potts
- The Coming of Amos (1925) - Bendyke Hamilton
- The Gilded Butterfly (1926) - Mr. Ralston
- The Danger Girl (1926) - Mortimer Travers
- Monte Carlo (1926) - Bancroft
- The Crown of Lies (1926) - Fritz
- The Midnight Sun (1926) - Yessky - Kusmin's Secretary
- Eve's Leaves (1926) - Missionary
- Footloose Widows (1926) - Henry
- Up in Mabel's Room (1926) - Simpson
- The False Alarm (1926)
- For Wives Only (1926)
- That Model from Paris (1926) - Modeling House Manager
- Dangerous Friends (1926) - Frederick Betts
- For Wives Only (1926) - Dr. Fritz Schwerman
- An Affair of the Follies (1927) - The Inventor
- The Mysterious Rider (1927) - King's Secretary
- The Love Thrill (1927) - Bragdon
- Tillie the Toiler (1927) - Mr. Smythe
- Ten Modern Commandments (1927) - George Disbrow
- The Rejuvenation of Aunt Mary (1927) - Gus Watkins
- Shanghai Bound (1927) - Algy
- A Texas Steer (1927) - Knott Innitt
- Husbands for Rent (1927) - Waldo Squibbs
- Just Married (1928) - Steward
- Home, James (1928) - William Waller (floorwalker)
- The Rush Hour (1928) - Professor Jones

Sound

- My Man (1928) - Thorne
- Stolen Kisses (1929) - Hoyt
- Protection (1929)
- The Wheel of Life (1929) - George Faraker
- Say It with Songs (1929) - Mr. Jones
- Her Private Affair (1930) - Michael Sturm
- Seven Keys to Baldpate (1929) - Professor Boyle (scenes deleted)
- Peacock Alley (1930) - Crosby
- Seven Days Leave (1930) - Mr. Willings
- The Girl Said No (1930) - The Minister (uncredited)
- Dumbbells in Ermine (1930) - Siegfried Strong
- Night Work (1930) - George Twining (uncredited)
- On Your Back (1930) - Victor
- Extravagance (1930) - Bridge Playing Guest
- The Life of the Party (1930) - Secretary
- Along Came Youth (1930) - Adkins
- Going Wild (1930) - Robert Story
- The Criminal Code (1931) - Leonard Nettleford
- The Gang Buster (1931) - Telephone Caller (uncredited)
- Inspiration (1931) - Gavarni
- Sit Tight (1931) - Mr. Bixby (uncredited)
- The Flood (1931) - Uncle George
- Young Sinners (1931) - (uncredited)
- Gold Dust Gertie (1931) - Dr. Rodman Tate - the Minister
- Bought (1931) - Archie (uncredited)
- Side Show (1931) - Dr. Martin (uncredited)
- Palmy Days (1931) - Man at Seance and at Party (uncredited)
- Take 'em and Shake 'em (1931, Short)
- Peach-O-Reno (1931) - Secretary
- Forbidden (1932) - Martin (uncredited)
- The Beast of the City (1932) - Intimidated Witness (uncredited)
- Impatient Maiden (1932) - Mr. Thomas
- Love in High Gear (1932) - Thaddeus Heath
- The Strange Case of Clara Deane (1932) - Mortimer (uncredited)
- New Morals for Old (1932) - Art Student (uncredited)
- Make Me a Star (1932) - Hardy Powell
- Unashamed (1932) - Dr. James W. Osgood (uncredited)
- Dynamite Ranch (1932) - Smithers
- The Washington Masquerade (1932) - Dinner Guest (uncredited)
- Madame Racketeer (1932) - Shiffem (uncredited)
- American Madness (1932) - Ives
- Devil and the Deep (1932) - Mr. Planet
- The All American (1932) - Smythe
- The Crusader (1932) - Oscar Shane
- Washington Merry-Go-Round (1932) - Willis
- Vanity Street (1932) - Albert Kerr- aka Mr. Tidy
- The Red-Haired Alibi (1932) - Henri
- Madison Square Garden (1932) - Desk Clerk (uncredited)
- Call Her Savage (1932) - Mr. Russell - Attorney (uncredited)
- 20,000 Years in Sing Sing (1932) - Dr. Meeker (uncredited)
- No Other Woman (1933) - Bridge Player (uncredited)
- The Billion Dollar Scandal (1933) - Masterson's Secretary (uncredited)
- Goldie Gets Along (1933) - Mayor Silas C. Simms
- Dangerously Yours (1933) - Dr. Ryder
- Phantom Thunderbolt (1933) - Eaton's Secretary (uncredited)
- The Eleventh Commandment (1933) - Charlie Moore
- Daring Daughters (1933) - Hubbard
- Pleasure Cruise (1933) - Rollins
- Infernal Machine (1933) - Man with Pet Mice (uncredited)
- The Cohens and Kellys in Trouble (1933) - Boswell (uncredited)
- Man Hunt (1933) - John Harper, Realtor (uncredited)
- Emergency Call (1933) - Millionaire's Male Secretary (uncredited)
- His Private Secretary (1933) - Little
- Heroes for Sale (1933) - Gibson's Secretary (uncredited)
- Gambling Ship (1933) - Roger (uncredited)
- Bed of Roses (1933) - Hoyt - Paige's Secretary (uncredited)
- Easy Millions (1933)
- Laughing at Life (1933) - Businessman
- A Shriek in the Night (1933) - Wilfred
- Shanghai Madness (1933) - Van Emery
- Sing Sinner Sing (1933) - Uncle Homer
- Ladies Must Love (1933) - Apartment Manager (uncredited)
- Ann Vickers (1933) - Mr. Penny (uncredited)
- Curtain at Eight (1933) - Watkins - Night Watchman
- Only Yesterday (1933) - Burton, Party Guest (uncredited)
- The Chief (1933) - Man at Alderman Meeting (uncredited)
- In the Money (1933) - Professor Higginbottom
- The Prizefighter and the Lady (1933) - Ringside Fan (uncredited)
- The Meanest Gal in Town (1934) - Minor Role (uncredited)
- The Ninth Guest (1934) - Osgood's Secretary (uncredited)
- The Cat and the Fiddle (1934) - Meek and Humble Man Knocked Down by Lady (uncredited)
- It Happened One Night (1934) - Zeke
- The Crosby Case (1934) - Wilson (uncredited)
- Uncertain Lady (1934) - Superintendent
- Unknown Blonde (1934) - Mr. Vail
- Sing and Like It (1934) - Theatre Tickets Buyer (uncredited)
- Marrying Widows (1934)
- Let's Try Again (1934) - Phillips, the Butler
- The Notorious Sophie Lang (1934) - Jeweler (uncredited)
- Hat, Coat, and Glove (1934) - Mr. James Gardner (uncredited)
- The Cat's-Paw (1934) - Reporter (uncredited)
- One More River (1934) - Perkins (uncredited)
- Springtime for Henry (1934) - Alfred Ordway
- Million Dollar Ransom (1934) - Justice of the Peace (uncredited)
- Kansas City Princess (1934) - Mr. Greenway
- Wake Up and Dream (1934) - George Spelvin
- Student Tour (1934) - Assistant to Dean (uncredited)
- No Ransom (1934) - Grant
- When Strangers Meet (1934) - Mr. Peter Peck
- I Sell Anything (1934) - Pedestrian Frank Entwistle (uncredited)
- I'll Fix It (1934) - School Principal (uncredited)
- Jealousy (1934) - Mr. Smith
- College Rhythm (1934) - Third Tramp (uncredited)
- Babbitt (1934) - Willis Ivans
- One Hour Late (1934) - Barlow
- Behind the Evidence (1935) - Secretary (uncredited)
- Society Doctor (1935) - Hospital Visitor (uncredited)
- Murder on a Honeymoon (1935) - Dr. O'Rourke
- All the King's Horses (1935) - Henpecked Husband (uncredited)
- A Night at the Ritz (1935) - Mr. Hassler
- Traveling Saleslady (1935) - Delegate (uncredited)
- Vagabond Lady (1935) - Spear Department Head (uncredited)
- Let 'Em Have It (1935) - Shoe Store Manager (uncredited)
- Ginger (1935) - Parker's Secretary (uncredited)
- Chinatown Squad (1935) - William Ward
- Love Me Forever (1935) - Sneezing Nightclub Patron (uncredited)
- The Raven (1935) - Chapman - Buyer of Poe Memorabilia (uncredited)
- Men of Action (1935) - Mr.Evans
- Welcome Home (1935) - Titwillow
- 1,000 Dollars a Minute (1935) - Jewel Store clerk
- Bad Boy (1935) - Department Store Manager (uncredited)
- Your Uncle Dudley (1935) - Mr. Deepwater (uncredited)
- Magnificent Obsession (1935) - Perry
- Two in the Dark (1936) - Mr. Pinkley (uncredited)
- My Marriage (1936) - Salesman (uncredited)
- Song and Dance Man (1936) - Timid Man (uncredited)
- Mr. Deeds Goes to Town (1936) - Budington (uncredited)
- Gentle Julia (1936) - Mr. Wainwright - Justice of the Peace (uncredited)
- Early to Bed (1936) - Smithers
- Fury (1936) - Grouch (uncredited)
- Poor Little Rich Girl (1936) - Percival Hooch
- M'Liss (1936) - Mayor James Morpher
- Sing, Baby, Sing (1936) - Mr. Vissinger (uncredited)
- Walking on Air (1936) - Mr. Thompson (uncredited)
- Lady Luck (1936) - J. Baldwin Hemingway
- Don't Turn 'Em Loose (1936) - Judge Bass - Head of Parole Board (uncredited)
- 15 Maiden Lane (1936) - Neilson - Jeweller's Assistant (uncredited)
- Smartest Girl in Town (1936) - The Minister (uncredited)
- Pennies from Heaven (1936) - Collector of Taxes (uncredited)
- Four Days' Wonder (1936) - George Parracot
- Laughing at Trouble (1936) - Sam Turner (uncredited)
- Great Guy (1936) - Furniture Salesman (uncredited)
- We Who Are About to Die (1937) - Governor's Secretary (uncredited)
- Racing Lady (1937) - Racetrack Bettor (uncredited)
- Join the Marines (1937) - Capt. James
- When You're in Love (1937) - Man with Newspaper and Deaf Wife (uncredited)
- Paradise Express (1937) - Phineas K. Trotter
- Let's Get Married (1937) - Minister (uncredited)
- A Star Is Born (1937) - Assistant Makeup Artist (uncredited)
- Ever Since Eve (1937) - Mr. Cuddleton, Hotel Manager
- Love in a Bungalow (1937) - A man
- Easy Living (1937) - Jeweler (uncredited)
- It's All Yours (1937) - Dabney
- She's No Lady (1937) - Mr. Douglas
- Partners in Crime (1937) - Callahan's Secretary (uncredited)
- The Wrong Road (1937) - Beamish, bank teller
- Love Takes Flight (1937) - Grey
- The Westland Case (1937) - Dr. Shuttle
- The Black Doll (1938) - Coroner
- Start Cheering (1938) - Librarian
- Love on a Budget (1938) - Fred - Chief Councilman (uncredited)
- A Trip to Paris (1938) - Chief Councilman (uncredited)
- The Devil's Party (1938) - Webster
- You and Me (1938) - Mr. Klein (uncredited)
- One Wild Night (1938) - McBride (uncredited)
- The Rage of Paris (1938) - Assistant Manager (uncredited)
- The Sisters (1938) - Tom Selig
- Five of a Kind (1938) - Editor Crane's Flunky (uncredited)
- Girls on Probation (1938) - Mr. Engstrom
- Hard to Get (1938) - Mr. Petewyler (uncredited)
- The Cowboy and the Lady (1938) - Valet (uncredited)
- Made for Each Other (1939) - Jury Foreman (uncredited)
- Sergeant Madden (1939) - Police Prompter (uncredited)
- East Side of Heaven (1939) - Loftus (uncredited)
- It Could Happen to You (1939) - Alumni Member (uncredited)
- Should Husbands Work? (1939) - Roberts
- The Man Who Wouldn't Talk (1940) - Little Man (uncredited)
- The Great McGinty (1940) - Mayor Wilfred T. Tillinghast
- I Love You Again (1940) - Mr. Hines - Floorwalker (uncredited)
- Hullabaloo (1940) - Audition Official (uncredited)
- Christmas in July (1940) - Mild Juror (uncredited)
- The Lady Eve (1941) - Lawyer at Phone in Pike's Office (uncredited)
- Million Dollar Baby (1941) - Mr. Fish, Attorney (uncredited)
- They Meet Again (1941) - Redmond, Governor's Secretary
- Moon Over Her Shoulder (1941) - Daniel Q. Boone Sr. (uncredited)
- Marry the Boss's Daughter (1941) - Tired Man (uncredited)
- Sullivan's Travels (1941) - Preacher at Revival Mission (uncredited)
- Babes on Broadway (1941) - Little Man Entering Nick's (uncredited)
- The Palm Beach Story (1942) - Pullman Conductor
- Apache Trail (1942) - Meredith - Stage Passenger (uncredited)
- My Heart Belongs to Daddy (1942) - Smith, Faculty Member (uncredited)
- Keep 'Em Slugging (1943) - Mr. Quink (uncredited)
- The Miracle of Morgan's Creek (1943) - McGinty's Secretary (uncredited)
- The Great Moment (1944) - Presidential Secretary (uncredited)
- Hail the Conquering Hero (1944) - Rev. Upperman (uncredited)
- The Sin of Harold Diddlebock (1947) - J.P. Blackstone (final film role)
