= The Stolen Jools =

1931 film

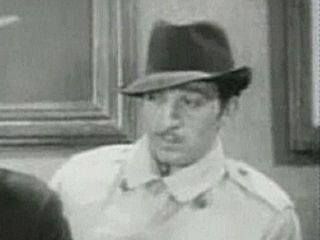
- George E. Stone in The Stolen Jools
- Directed by: William C. McGann
- Written by: Al Boasberg (uncredited); Edwin J. Burke (uncredited); Arthur Caesar (uncredited); George Arthur Gray (uncredited); Howard J. Green (uncredited); Harrison Greene (uncredited); Percy Heath (uncredited); Carlisle Jones (uncredited); Harry Myers (uncredited); E.K. Nadel (uncredited); Edgar Allan Woolf (uncredited)
- Produced by: Pat Casey
- Starring: Wallace Beery; Buster Keaton; Edward G. Robinson; Joan Crawford; Fay Wray; Gary Cooper
- Distributed by: Paramount Pictures
- Release date: April 4, 1931
- Running time: 20 minutes
- Country: United States
- Language: English

The Stolen Jools is a 1931 American pre-Code comedy short produced by the Masquers Club of Hollywood, featuring many cameo appearances by film stars and featured players of the day. The film was distributed by Paramount Pictures to raise funds for the National Vaudeville Artists Tuberculosis Sanitarium. The UCLA Film and Television Archive entry for this film says—as do the credits—that the film was co-sponsored by Chesterfield cigarettes to support the "fine work" of the NVA sanitarium.

The film, being made for charity, has an unusually large cast of actors who volunteered to appear. Studios represented included Paramount, Warner Bros., RKO, MGM, Fox Film, and Hal Roach.

For decades the film was unavailable for viewing, although at least one 35mm release print was known to survive in private hands. Home-movie distributor Blackhawk Films offered reprints to the collectors' market in the 1970s. Another print was found in the United Kingdom in the 1990s, under the British release title The Slippery Pearls.

== Plot ==
At the "Screen Stars Annual Ball", Norma Shearer's jewels are stolen. The police must find them and return them to her. Private detective Eddie Kane investigates by trailing movie personalities and interrogating them. The mystery is solved by child performer Mitzi Green, who witnessed the robbery.

== Cast ==
The original film did not include credits; most of the players were instantly recognizable by audiences of the day. Eddie Kane, the only actor who appears throughout the film, mentions many of them by name as they appear.

At the Police Station

- Wallace Beery
- Buster Keaton
- Jack Hill
- J. Farrell MacDonald
- Edward G. Robinson
- George E. Stone

The Law

- Eddie Kane
- Stan Laurel and Oliver Hardy

At the Victim's House

- Our Gang: Farina, Stymie, Chubby,
  Mary Ann Jackson, Shirley Jean Rickert,
  Echo, Wheezer, Pete the Pup
- Polly Moran
- Norma Shearer
- Hedda Hopper

Tete-a-Tete

- Joan Crawford
- William Haines

On the Porch Swing

- Dorothy Lee

At Breakfast

- Victor McLaglen
- Edmund Lowe
- El Brendel

In the Hotel

- Charlie Murray
- George Sidney
- Winnie Lightner
- Fifi D'Orsay
- Warner Baxter
- Irene Dunne

At Lunch

- Bert Wheeler and Robert Woolsey

In the Movie Studio

- Richard Dix
- Claudia Dell
- Lowell Sherman

At the Newspaper Office

- Eugene Pallette
- Stuart Erwin
- Skeets Gallagher
- Gary Cooper
- Wynne Gibson
- Charles "Buddy" Rogers

On the Telephone

- Maurice Chevalier

Under the Tree

- Douglas Fairbanks Jr.
- Loretta Young

On the Street

- Richard Barthelmess
- Charles Butterworth

Couples at Home

- Bebe Daniels and Ben Lyon
- Barbara Stanwyck and Frank Fay

In a Movie Scene

- Jack Oakie and Fay Wray

The Bearded Man

- Joe E. Brown

In the Projection Room

- George "Gabby" Hayes
- "Little Billy" Rhodes

Solving the Mystery

- Mitzi Green

Master of Ceremonies

- Bert Lytell (not seen in current prints)

(Uncredited)

- Robert Ames

== Reception ==
The Stolen Jools had enormous star power for audiences of 1931, and its benevolent message also appealed to America's theater owners. The film found record-breaking acceptance across America, as Film Daily reported: "A world record for day-and-date bookings will be established tomorrow with the release to 2,264 theaters from coast to coast of The Stolen Jools, the NVA Week-sponsored short subject, in which 55 stars appear. All major [theater] circuits and many independent groups are included in the booking. The policy of the RKO Palace, which only runs a newsreel in addition to vaudeville, will be changed to include the subject."

The Stolen Jools was referenced in an all-star The Voice of Hollywood short of 1932, hosted by John Wayne. In this novelty short, Eddie Kane appears in character as the detective, still looking for the stolen jewels.

== Original vs. current versions ==
The original-release print included fragments of popular songs (for example, Dorothy Lee sings a few phrases of the song "I Love You So Much" from the Wheeler and Woolsey comedy The Cuckoos). When Blackhawk was preparing the film for home-movie release, company officer David Shepard tried to clear the rights to the music, only to find opposition: "To clear music rights in a film (any film) at that time, one had to deal with an iron maiden called Miss Mingle at the Harry Fox Agency in New York. Harry Fox Agency then had monopoly representation of virtually all music publishers for so-called 'sync rights.' Miss Mingle would not consider licensing sync rights unless one could first prove to her that one had a license on the film itself. To show her that the film had fallen into the public domain or was never copyrighted in the first place cut no ice with her." With this avenue closed to Shepard, he was forced to delete the song snippets from the Blackhawk reprint. However, another home-movie distributor, Thunderbird Films, had its own print of The Stolen Jools with the music intact, and issued reprints in competition with Blackhawk.

Actor Bert Lytell appeared in the original-release print at the very end of the film, asking movie audiences to donate to the NVA's charity appeal. Current film and video versions in circulation do not include Lytell's curtain speech.

== See also ==
- List of rediscovered films
