= Going Wild =

1930 film directed by William A. Seiter

- Lobby card
- Directed by: William A. Seiter
- Written by: Henry McCarty; Humphrey Pearson
- Based on: The Aviator; 1910 play by James Montgomery
- Produced by: William A. Seiter
- Starring: Joe E. Brown; Ona Munson; Walter Pidgeon
- Cinematography: Sol Polito
- Edited by: Peter Fritch
- Music by: Erno Rapee; David Mendoza (composer)
- Production company: First National Pictures
- Distributed by: First National Pictures
- Release date: December 21, 1930
- Running time: 68 minutes
- Country: United States
- Language: English

Going Wild is a 1930 Warner Brothers pre-Code comedy film based on the 1910 play The Aviator by James Montgomery and directed by William A. Seiter. The film stars many musical stars along with Joe E. Brown, Frank McHugh and Johnny Arthur.

A print is held in the Library of Congress collection.

== Plot ==
Going Wild (1930)

Rollo Smith and his friend Jack Lane are down on their luck and have stowed away on a train, finding a place in the compartment of ace pilot and writer Robert Story. The conductor ejects Rollo and Jack from the train just where the famous writer is supposed to arrive, and Rollo is mistaken for Story.

Peggy Freeman and May Bunch both vie for Rollo's attention, believing that he is a famous pilot. The girls receive free room and meals at the Palm Inn. Rollo, who has never flown, is invited to fly in an air race as Story against a real aviator, "Ace" Benton, with a chance to win a $25,000 wager. After he somehow lifts the plane off the ground, Rollo can barely control the aircraft. Ferguson, the real pilot whom Peggy had locked in a closet, appears, but Rollo continues to unwittingly perform an aerial show, forcing Ace to abandon the race.

When Peggy accidentally pulls her parachute ring, Rollo joins her as they safely float to earth and he proposes.

== Cast ==
- Joe E. Brown as Rollo Smith
- Lawrence Gray as Jack Lane
- Ona Munson as Ruth Howard
- Walter Pidgeon as "Ace" Benton
- Laura Lee as Peggy Freeman
- Frank McHugh as "Ricky" Freeman
- May Boley as May Bunch
- Anders Randolf as Edward Howard
- Arthur Hoyt as Robert Story
- Johnny Arthur as Simpkins
- Fred Kelsey as The Conductor
- Harvey Clark as Herndon Reamer
- Max Wagner as Ferguson

== Production ==
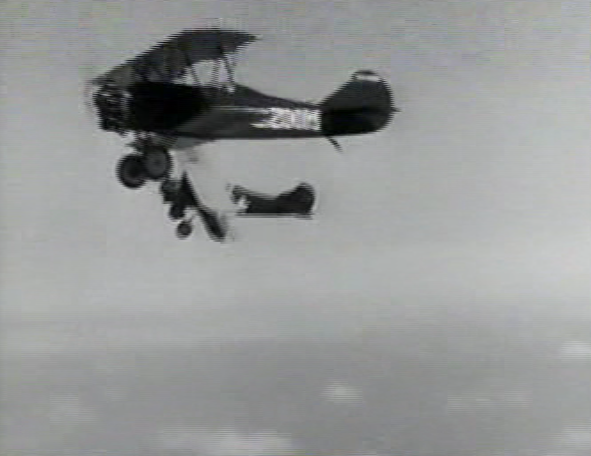
The last 10 minutes of Going Wild showcase an impromptu aerial duel.

Going Wild was filmed in Glendale, California at the Griffith Park Aerodrome using California National Guard hangars, with additional scenes shot at the Warner Bros. studios. A Travel Air B-4000 (c/n 1323, NC688K) appearing as the Blue Star is the same aircraft that appears in the Tailspin Tommy film series (1934) and Wings in the Dark (1935). The character of Ace Barton flies a Travel Air 9000/4000 (c/n 381, NC4421) named the Zoom, later appearing in Skyway (1933).

The film was originally intended as a musical, but only one song, "My Hero Mine," is featured, sung by Joe E. Brown and Laura Lee. Several other musical numbers are heard in the background throughout the film. The press sheet for the film did not mention "My Hero Mine." During production, many cuts to the film were made, including all of the original music. Two other films featuring Brown, Top Speed (1930) and Sit Tight (1931), met the same fate. (Note: Due to the backlash against musicals, all of the musical talent in Going Wild were released from their Warner Bros. contracts by 1931.)

A French version titled L'aviateur was released in 1931.

== Reception ==
In a contemporary review for The New York Times, critic Mordaunt Hall wrote: "It is a farce that depends more upon actions than words, and it was no wonder that the spectators at an early showing of this film actually shrieked with laughter and really rocked in their seats. It is an ingenious affair which is not particularly novel, but the manner in which it is worked out is decidedly clever. There are several episodes that defy anybody to keep a straight face."

Aviation-film historian Stephen Pendo has noted that Going Wild contains a similar theme to that of The Aviator (1929).

== Preservation status ==
Going Wild survives only in the edited version that was released in late 1930 by Warner Bros. The complete film was released intact in countries outside the United States, but it is unknown whether a copy of this full version still exists.

The edited version has been released on DVD through the Warner Archive Collection.
