= The Show of Shows =

1929 film

Show of Shows
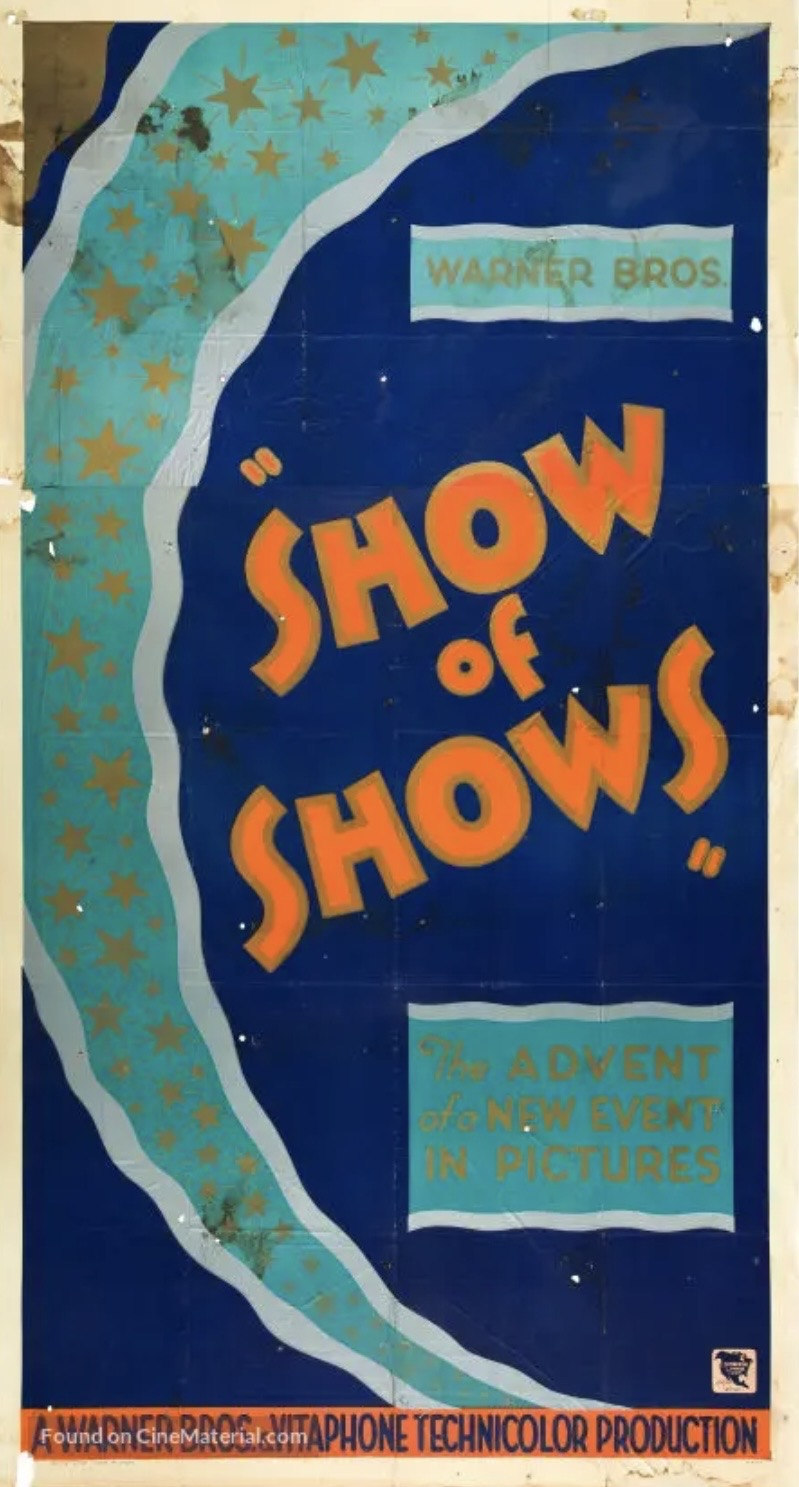
- Theatrical release poster style B
- Directed by: John G. Adolfi
- Written by: Special material: Frank Fay; J. Keirn Brennan
- Produced by: Darryl F. Zanuck
- Cinematography: Barney McGill
- Music by: Edward Ward
- Color process: Technicolor Process 3
- Production company: Warner Bros. Pictures
- Distributed by: Warner Bros. Pictures
- Release dates: November 28, 1929 (NYC); December 29, 1929 (US); March 24, 1930 (LDN); June 7, 1930 (AU); September 29, 1930 (UK)
- Running time: 128 minutes 107 minutes (Technicolor)
- Country: United States
- Language: English
- Budget: $795,000
- Box office: $1,624,000

Show of Shows (also The Show of Shows in various contemporary media accounts) is a 1929 American sound pre-Code musical revue film directed by John G. Adolfi and distributed by Warner Bros. Pictures. The sound Vitaphone production was shot almost entirely in Technicolor, cost almost $800,000 and earned more than twice as much at the box office.

Show of Shows was Warner Bros.' fifth color film; the first four were The Desert Song (1929), On with the Show! (1929), Gold Diggers of Broadway (1929) and Paris (1929). (Song of the West was actually completed by June 1929 but its release was delayed until March 1930.) The film features most of the contemporary Warner Bros. film stars, including John Barrymore, Richard Barthelmess, Noah Beery, Loretta Young, Dolores Costello, Bull Montana, Myrna Loy, Chester Conklin, Douglas Fairbanks Jr., Winnie Lightner, Tully Marshall, Nick Lucas and Betty Compson.

== Plot ==
The Show of Shows (1929)

The film is styled in the same format as was the earlier MGM film The Hollywood Revue of 1929. Because of the film's high budget, although it performed well at the box office, it did not return as much profit as did The Hollywood Revue of 1929. Show of Shows was originally intended as an all-color sound film and promoted as such, but 21 minutes were shot in black and white—17 minutes of the first part and the first four minutes of part two.

The film features most of the players under contract to Warner Bros/First National Pictures, except for Al Jolson, George Arliss, Colleen Moore, Corinne Griffith, and Billie Dove. Unlike the all-star revues of the other studios, The Show of Shows has far fewer star names and star specialties, so most of the talent consists of second-echelon stars and featured players, presented in groups (a pageant of sister acts; six silent comics as "The Floradora Boys"; a gay-nineties skit with assorted leading men and women; a gallery of screen villains on a pirate ship, etc.). Most of the performers vanished from the studio by 1931, either having retired after silent-film careers, or being released from their contracts when musicals became unpopular.

Show of Shows features many stars of silent films as well as stage and novelty acts. Frank Fay appears as the master of ceremonies.

=== Segments ===
- Prologue — A scene set in the French Revolution, with William Courtenay as a priest, Hobart Bosworth as an executioner and H. B. Warner as an aristocrat who is executed on a guillotine.
- "Military March"— A pageant led by Monte Blue and Pasadena American Legion Fife and Drum Corps set entirely on a huge set of steps with the cadets changing formation to provide a series of color effects in a manner that would be popularized much later by Busby Berkeley.
- "What's Become of the Floradora Boys?" — Alice Day, Lila Lee, Myrna Loy, Patsy Ruth Miller, Marian Nixon, Sally O'Neil, Ben Turpin, Heinie Conklin, Lupino Lane, Lee Moran, Bert Roach and Lloyd Hamilton appear in a partial parody of the Florodora Edwardian stage show.
- "$20 Bet"— Fay attempts to sing but is constantly interrupted by Chester Morris, Jack Mulhall and Sojin Kamiyama.
- "Motion Picture Pirates" — Ted Lewis leads a fantasy number set on a pirate ship with Noah Beery, Tully Marshall, Wheeler Oakman, Kalla Pasha, Bull Montana, Anders Randolf and other well-known screen villains. A group of beautiful girls are captured and saved by light comedian Johnny Arthur parodying Douglas Fairbanks. The day is saved by bandleader Ted Lewis.
- "If I Could Learn to Love (As Well as I Fight)" — In a brief introductory sequence, missing from circulating prints, French boxer Georges Carpentier is introduced by Fay, who provokes Carpentier into lightly tapping him with his formidable hands, to which Fay comically overreacts. Carpentier sings against an Eiffel Tower backdrop accompanied by Patsy Ruth Miller and Alice White and a chorus of girls. A precision dance routine follows, with the performers on an upright series of geometric struts.
- "Dear Little Pup" — Black-and-white sequence featuring Fay.
- "Ping Pongo" — Black-and-white sequence featuring Winnie Lightner. The song was used in her 1930 film, She Couldn't Say No.
- "The Only Song I Know" — Black-and-white sequence featuring Nick Lucas.
- "Recitations" — Featuring Beatrice Lillie, Louise Fazenda, Lloyd Hamilton and Fay, the sequence is a series of stark poetic recitations that are performed by each performer whole and then line by line, and when the lines are mixed, they describe a bizarre and suggestive product. The sequence also includes a parody of the song "Your Mother and Mine" and a series of jokes.
- "Meet My Sister" — The feature is introduced by a deliberately nervous Richard Barthelmess followed by Hollywood sisters, including Dolores and Helene Costello, singing "My Sister", along with Loretta Young and Sally Blane, Sally O'Neil and Molly O'Day, Alice Day and Marceline Day, Marion Byron and Harriette Lake (later known as Ann Sothern), Viola Dana and Shirley Mason, Lola and Armida Vendrell and Alberta and Adamae Vaughn. All of the pairs were sisters in real life except for Byron and Lake, who were not related. Each set of twins represent a different country with corresponding backdrops.
- Intermission— A title card is shown. This is missing from some prints.
- "Singin' in the Bathtub" — Winnie Lightner and male chorines parody "Singin' in the Rain" against a bathroom set, and with Lightner and former wrestler Bull Montana sing a parody of the MGM song "You Were Meant for Me" from the 1929 film The Broadway Melody. This number was originally slightly longer, and was also printed in black and white on the release prints.
- "Just an Hour of Love" – Performed by Irene Bordoni.
- "A Chinese Fantasy" — Canine performer Rin Tin Tin barks, with Nick Lucas singing "Li-Po-Li" and Myrna Loy dancing.
- "Frank Fay with Sid Silvers" — Sid Silvers is featured in a comedy sketch as an annoying spectator who is auditioning for a solo spot by showing Fay his imitation of Al Jolson singing "Rock-a-Bye Your Baby with a Dixie Melody".
- "A Bicycle Built for Two" — In a music-hall pastiche, Chester Conklin, Douglas Fairbanks Jr, Chester Morris, Gertrude Olmstead Sally Eilers and others sing the 1890s standard "Daisy Bell" against a revolving backdrop.
- "If Your Best Friend Won't Tell You (Why Should I?)" — Silvers and Fay sing about halitosis.
- "Larry Ceballos' Black and White Girls" — Silvers introduces a segment featuring chorus girls in black-and-white dresses. One half of the girls wear black fronts and white backs (with corresponding wigs) while the others wear outfits with the colors reversed. The dancers switch from white to black or form geometric patterns to the instrumental "Jumping Jack". This is a reworking of a nearly identical dance routine set to "The Doll Dance", which also appeared in the 1928 two-reeler Larry Ceballos' Roof Garden Revue. The dance appears to begin again but is halted by Louise Fazenda, who complains about the costumes and demands that Fay return to the stage, but he appears without his pants.
- "Your Love Is All I Crave" — Fay sings a torch song of lost love and introduces the number with a series of topical jokes.
- "King Richard III (in excerpt from Henry VI, Part 3)" — John Barrymore introduces and recites a Shakespeare extract, and E. J. Ratcliffe, Anthony Bushell and Reginald Sharland appear.
- "Mexican Moonshine" — Monte Blue plays a condemned man with Fay as his executioner, accompanied by Tully Marshall, Lloyd Hamilton, Kalla Pasha, Lee Moran, Noah Beery and Albert Gran as soldiers. It is a parody of Chesterfield cigarette advertising. A similar idea, parodying a cigarette advertising slogan, also appears in the opening seconds of Gold Diggers of Broadway (1929).
- "Lady Luck" — In the film's finale, which lasts more than 15 minutes, the original Technicolor version starts with Alexander Gray singing "Lady Luck" with ladies in sparkly outfits, some of which refer to gambling, walk down the stairs inside an enormous ballroom set with windows revealing a green sky. Two lines of chorus girls come out and do a dance to "Believe Me". More songs are reprised, including "The Only Song I Know", "If I Could Learn to Love (As Well As I Fight)", and "Singin' in the Bathtub" and tap dancers perform on a wooden floor. Betty Compson walks the stage to meet Alexander Gray, and with the whole cast assembled, hundreds of colored streamers drop from the roof.
- "Curtain of Stars" — The cast appear with their heads poked through holes in canvas, singing "Lady Luck".

=== Songs featured ===
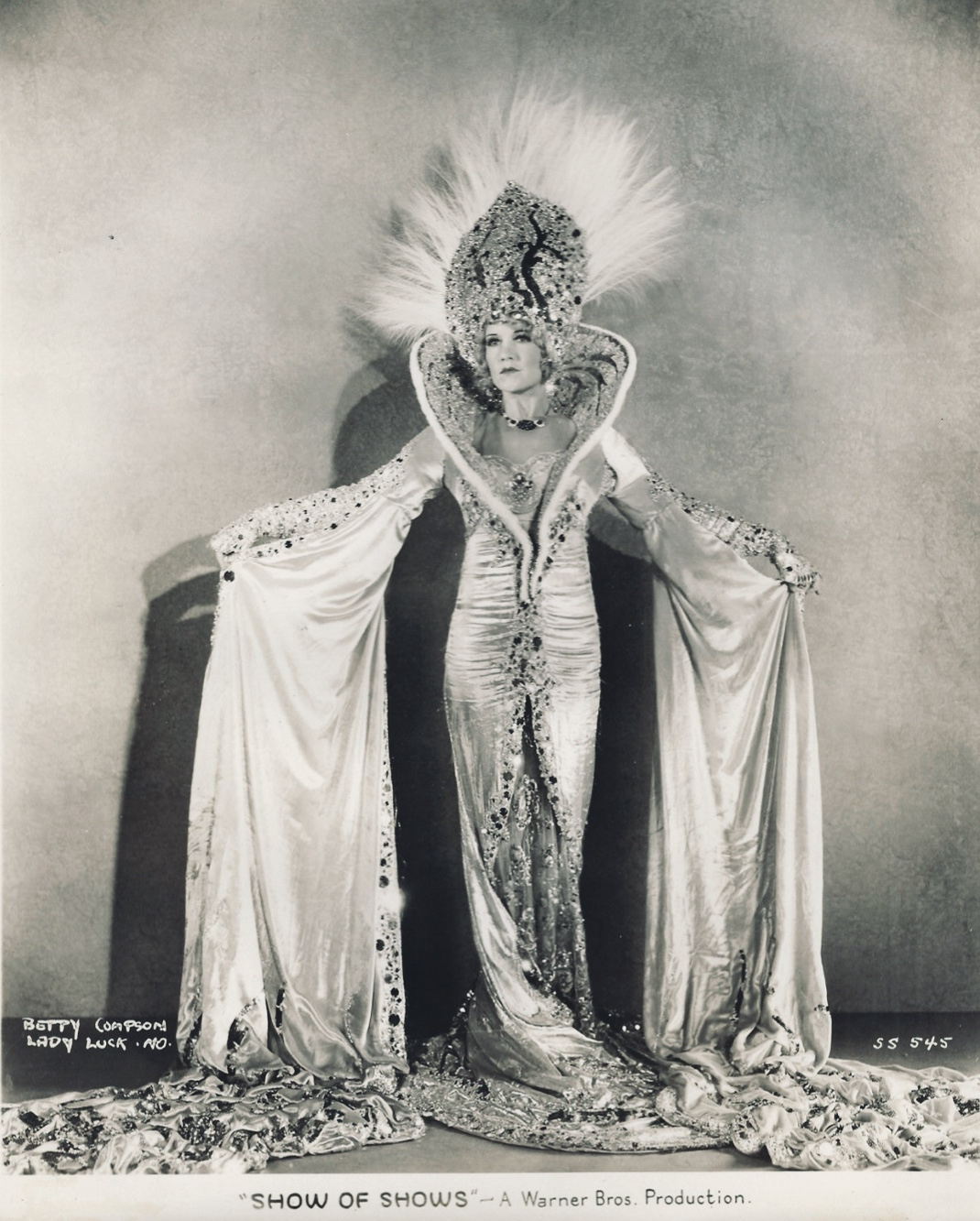
Betty Compson as Lady Luck

- "You Were Meant For Me" — Music by Nacio Herb Brown, lyrics by Arthur Freed
- "Singin' in the Bathtub" — Music by Michael Cleary, lyrics by Herb Magidson and Ned Washington
- "Lady Luck" — Music and Lyrics by Ray Perkins
- "Pirate Band" — Music by M.K. Jerome, lyrics by J. Keirn Brennan
- "If I Could Learn to Love (As Well as I Fight)" — Music by M.K. Jerome, lyrics by Herman Ruby
- "Ping Pongo" — Music by Joseph Burke, lyrics by Al Dubin
- "The Only Song I Know" — Music by Ray Perkins, lyrics by J. Keirn Brennan
- "My Sister" — Music by Ray Perkins, lyrics by J. Keirn Brennan
- "Your Mother and Mine" — Music by Gus Edwards, lyrics by Joe Goodwin
- "Just an Hour of Love" — Music by Edward Ward, lyrics by Alfred Bryan
- "Li-Po-Li" — Music by Edward Ward, lyrics by Alfred Bryan
- "Rock-A-Bye Your Baby with a Dixie Melody" — Music by Jean Schwartz, lyrics by Sam M. Lewis and Joe Young
- "If Your Best Friend Won't Tell You" — Music by Joseph Burke, lyrics by Al Dubin
- "Your Love is All that I Crave" — Music by Jimmy Johnson, lyrics by Perry Bradford and Al Dubin
- "What's Become of the Floradora Boys?" — Music and lyrics by Ray Perkins
- "Dear Little Pup" — Music by Ray Perkins, lyrics by J. Keirn Brennan
- "Daisy Bell (Bicycle Built for Two)" — written by Harry Dacre
- "Believe Me" — Music by Edward Ward, lyrics by Alfred Bryan

== Cast ==
=== Credited ===
Performer	Segment
Frank Fay	Master of ceremonies
Harry Akst	Onscreen pianist
Armida Vendrell	"Meet My Sister" and "Lady Luck" finale
Johnny Arthur	"Motion Picture Pirates"
Mary Astor	"Motion Picture Pirates"
William Bakewell	"Bicycle Built for Two"
John Barrymore	"Henry VI Part III"
Richard Barthelmess	Introduces "Meet My Sister"
Noah Beery	"Motion Picture Pirates", "Mexican Moonshine"
Sally Blane	"Meet My Sister"
Monte Blue	"Mexican Moonshine"
Irène Bordoni	Singing "Just an Hour of Love"
Hobart Bosworth	"Prologue" (executioner)
Harriet Byron	"Meet My Sister", "Bicycle Built for Two"
Marion Byron	"Meet My Sister"
Georges Carpentier	"If I Could Learn to Love (As Well as I Fight)"
Ethlyne Clair	"Motion Picture Pirates"
Betty Compson	"Lady Luck" (Finale)
Chester Conklin	"Bicycle Built for Two"
Dolores Costello	"Meet My Sister"
Helene Costello	"Meet My Sister"
William Courtenay	"Prologue" (priest)
Viola Dana	"Meet My Sister", "Motion Picture Pirates"
Alice Day	"What's Become of the Florodora Boys", "Meet My Sister"
Marceline Day	"Meet My Sister"
Douglas Fairbanks Jr.	"Bicycle Built for Two"
Louise Fazenda	"Recitations"
Albert Gran	"Mexican Moonshine"
Alexander Gray	"Lady Luck" (Finale)
Lloyd Hamilton	"Florodora", "Recitations", "Mexican Moonshine"
Lupino Lane	"What's Become of the Florodora Boys"
Lila Lee	"What's Become of the Florodora Boys"
Ted Lewis and his Orchestra	
Winnie Lightner	"Ping Pongo", "Singin' in the Bathtub"
Jacqueline Logan	"Motion Picture Pirates"
Lola	"Meet My Sister", "Lady Luck" (Finale)
Myrna Loy	"Florodora Boys", "Believe Me" (Finale) and "A Chinese Fantasy"
Nick Lucas	"The Only Song I Know", "A Chinese Fantasy" and "Lady Luck" (Finale)
Tully Marshall	"Motion Picture Pirates", "Mexican Moonshine"
Shirley Mason	"Meet My Sister"
Patsy Ruth Miller	"What's Become of the Florodora Boys", "If I Could Learn to Love (As Well as I Fight)"
Bull Montana	"Motion Picture Pirates", "Singin' in the Bathtub"
Lee Moran	"What's Become of the Florodora Boys", "Mexican Moonshine"
Chester Morris	"$20 Bet", "Bicycle Built for Two"
Jack Mulhall	"$20 Bet"
Edna Murphy	"Motion Picture Pirates"
Carmel Myers	"Motion Picture Pirates"
Marian Nixon	"What's Become of the Florodora Boys"
Molly O'Day	"Meet My Sister"
Sally O'Neil	"What's Become of the Florodora Boys", "Meet My Sister"
Gertrude Olmstead	"Motion Picture Pirates"
Kalla Pasha	"Motion Picture Pirates"
Anders Randolf	"Motion Picture Pirates"
Rin Tin Tin	Introduces "A Chinese Fantasy"
Bert Roach	"What's Become of the Florodora Boys"
Sid Silvers	Introduces "Black and White Girls"
Sōjin Kamiyama	"$20 Bet"
Ben Turpin	"What's Become of the Florodora Boys"
Eddie Ward	
H.B. Warner	"Prologue" (aristocrat)
Alice White	"If I Could Learn To Love (As Well as I Fight)"
Lois Wilson	"Bicycle Built for Two"
Grant Withers	"Bicycle Built for Two"
Loretta Young	"Meet My Sister"

=== Uncredited ===
- Anthony Bushell
- Ruth Clifford
- William Collier Jr.
- Jack Curtis
- Sally Eilers
- Pauline Garon
- Julanne Johnston
- Frances Lee
- Otto Matieson
- Philo McCullough
- Wheeler Oakman
- E. J. Ratcliffe
- Louis Silvers
- Ann Sothern
- Lester Stevens
- Ted Williams

== Production ==
Four specialty acts were filmed but deleted from the final release print. Each was released separately in 1930 as a Vitaphone Varieties short subject:

- Evolution of the Dance (February 1930, Technicolor, 12 minutes): A pageant of performers offering various styles of dance, featuring the comically clumsy Lupino Lane in a hobo ensemble. Dance directors Larry Ceballos and Jack Haskell received screen credit in the short subject, but Lane did not.
- Jack Buchanan with the Glee Quartet (March 1930, black-and-white, 6 minutes): The British entertainer originally performed this sketch on Broadway in The Charlot Revue of 1926. Buchanan apologizes to the audience for his unscheduled appearance (two of his remarks referring to Show of Shows were deleted) and explains that he is an emergency replacement for one of the Glee Quartet. The group presents "The Fox Has Left His Lair", but the singers perform so briskly that Buchanan becomes flustered and tries desperately to keep pace.
- Beatrice Lillie and Her Boyfriends (March 1930, black-and-white, 6 minutes): Lillie sings "I've Got a Masculine Complex" but is interrupted by young male dancers, followed by old male dancers, followed by midget male dancers. Lillie was angered that this sequence, staged with low and obvious comedy, and so it was released as a short subject. She sued Warner Bros. for $50,000 because the short "presented her to the world as a cheap and inconsequential performer". She lost the suit, appealed the verdict, and finally lost again in 1934.

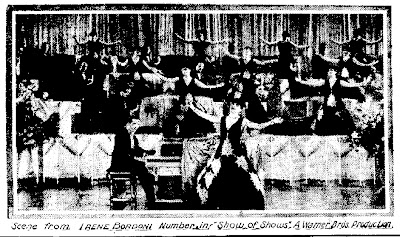
Irène Bordoni in the deleted number "Believe Me"

- Hello, Baby! (March 1930, Technicolor, 20 minutes, two-reeler): Ann Pennington sings "Believe Me", which originally was to be sung by Irène Bordoni but was cut from the final release. The Bordoni version was later released by Columbia Records with the accompanying song "Just an Hour of Love". Pennington also sang three other songs from the 1929 film "The Forward Pass". She was intended to have dance sequences in the finale, but they were also cut. "Hello, Baby!" Is believed to be completely lost except for outtakes stored at the George Eastman House.

== Reception ==
According to Warner Bros. records, the film earned $1,259,000 domestically and $336,000 internationally.

== Preservation ==
Show of Shows survives in a black-and-white 1958 print from Associated Artists Productions. Some color segments have been recovered, including:

1. "Meet My Sister" – Sequence was shown publicly at the 2015 TCM Classic Film Festival.

2. "A Chinese Fantasy" – Entire sequence is present in commercially available copies of the film.

3. "Frank Fay With Sid Silvers" – An announcement was made in July 2017 by the Vitaphone Project that portions of this sequence have been recovered, and preservation is ongoing.

4. "A Bicycle Built For Two" – An announcement was made in July 2017 by the Vitaphone Project that portions of this sequence have also been recovered, and preservation is ongoing.

5. "If Your Best Friend Won't Tell You" – An announcement was made in July 2017 by the Vitaphone Project that portions of this sequence have also been recovered, and preservation is ongoing.

6. "King Richard III" – At least one Technicolor specimen frame is known to exist.

7. "Finale" – A six-minute segment of this sequence was shown publicly in Australia in the late 1970s, but the print is believed to have been destroyed in the late 1980s. The British Film Archive has extracts from this scene along with snippets from other early film musicals. At least one Technicolor specimen frame from this sequence is known to exist.

8. "Curtain of Stars" – A four-second segment of this sequence was restored by the George Eastman House.

The Library of Congress maintains a copy (since the 1970s) of the black/white version.

In 2022, an unofficial reconstructed colorized version was published online.

All discs, including the overture, entr’acte, and exit music exist.

== See also ==
- List of early color feature films
