= The Life of the Party (1930 film) =

1930 American film

- Theatrical release poster
- Directed by: Roy Del Ruth
- Written by: Darryl F. Zanuck; Arthur Caesar
- Starring: Winnie Lightner; Irene Delroy
- Cinematography: Devereaux Jennings; Frank B. Good (Technicolor)
- Edited by: William Holmes
- Music by: Earle Crooker; Sidney D. Mitchell
- Color process: Technicolor Process 3
- Production company: Warner Bros. Pictures
- Distributed by: Warner Bros. Pictures
- Release date: October 25, 1930 (US)
- Running time: 79 minutes
- Country: United States
- Language: English
- Budget: $460,000
- Box office: $897,000

The Life of the Party is a 1930 American pre-Code musical comedy filmed entirely in Technicolor. The musical numbers of this film were cut out before general release in the United States because the public had grown tired of musicals by late 1930. Only one song was left in the picture. The complete film was released intact in countries outside the United States where a backlash against musicals never occurred.

== Plot ==
Flo and Dot work in a Broadway music shop. Flo sings while Dot plays the piano. Their boss complains to them that they are not selling as much sheet music as they should, and asks them to change their technique. Flo sings a song for a customer, "Poison Ivy", after which, one of Dot's admirers, Monsieur LeMaire, an eccentric Frenchman who owns a modiste shop, enters the shop. He begins annoying the boss by chatting with Dot and asking her out. When the boss tells him to come back after they finish working, LeMaire flies into a rage and throws sheet music all over the store. The boss immediately fires Dot and Flo. The scene moves to the apartment where the two women live. Dot is reading the newspaper and finds out her boyfriend has eloped with a rich elderly widow. She is so angry that she accepts Flo's idea that they become gold-diggers. Flo suggests that their first victim be LeMaire and the next day they begin to work for him. LeMaire soon asks Dot and Flo to a private party. Flo tells him they would love to attend but they have no suitable clothes. LeMaire tells them that they can borrow clothes from his modiste shop. Dot and Flo agree to attend the party and then pack off all the clothes they can carry with them. They head off to the train station with their luggage of expensive clothes and decide to go to Havana to make some real money.

Once Flo and Dot arrive in Havana they find that a millionaire, "A.J. Smith", who invented a famous soft drink, is staying at the hotel. They assume that a mean spirited and snobby acting man is the millionaire but the true millionaire is a young, pleasant and down-to-earth man. Dot falls in love with Smith, much to Flo's chagrin. Smith, unbeknownst to Flo and Dot, is actually a gigolo looking for a rich woman to pay his meal ticket. Just as Dot is to marry the gigolo, LeMaire arrives and exposes the two gold-diggers. Smith, who has fallen in love with Dot, writes a check to LeMaire to cover the amount he lost, and he ends up winning Dot as his future wife.

A subplot involves Flo and Colonel Joy, who raises horses. Colonel Joy is attracted to Flo and can't stop talking to her, although she does her best to avoid him. After some time, Flo is convinced by the colonel that his horse can't lose in the upcoming horse-race. She takes a chance and bets all her money, only to lose everything. Eventually they grow fond of each other and Colonel Joy proposes to Flo at the end of the film.

== Cast ==
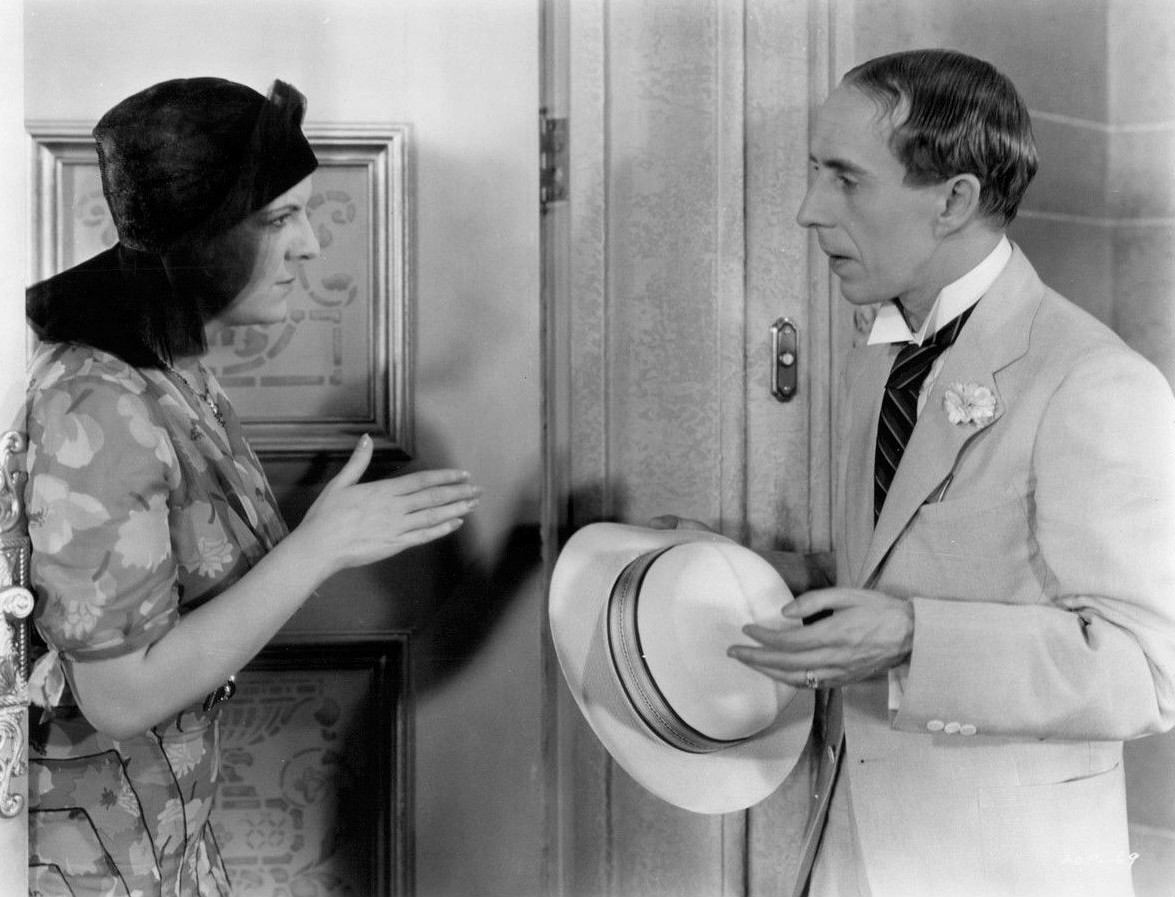
Winnie Lightner and Charles Butterworth in a scene from the 1930 film.

- Winnie Lightner as Flo
- Irene Delroy as Dorothy "Dot" Stottsbury
- Jack Whiting as the real Jerry "A.J." Smith
- Charles Butterworth as Colonel Joy
- Charles Judels as Monsieur LeMaire
- John Davidson as the fake Jerry "A.J." Smith
- Arthur Hoyt as Jerry's secretary

== Songs ==
- "Poison Ivy"
- "Can It Be Possible?"(Cut from United States release print)
- "One Robin Doesn't Make A Spring" (Cut from United States release print)
- "Somehow" (Cut from United States release print)

== Production ==
The music heard of the credits at the beginning of the film was added in the 1950s. These credits are also not original but have been redrawn, removing all indication that the film was photographed in Technicolor. The original music survives on Vitaphone disks. The rest of the film, beginning with the first title card ("New York was originally purchased from the Indians..."), has the original sound.

== Box office ==
According to Warner Bros records the film earned $685,000 domestically and $212,000 foreign.

== Preservation ==
The film survives only in a black and white copy (of the cut United States release print) made in 1958 by Associated Artists Productions. The complete film was released intact in countries outside the United States where a backlash against musicals never occurred. It is unknown whether a copy of this full version still exists.

== See also ==
- List of early color feature films
