= Dumbbells in Ermine =

1930 film

- theatrical release poster
- Directed by: John G. Adolfi
- Written by: James Gleason; Harvey F. Thew
- Based on: Weak Sisters (1925 play) by Lynn Starling
- Starring: Robert Armstrong; Barbara Kent
- Cinematography: Devereux Jennings
- Production company: Warner Bros. Pictures
- Distributed by: Warner Bros. Pictures
- Release date: May 10, 1930
- Running time: 70 minutes
- Country: United States
- Language: English

Dumbbells in Ermine is a 1930 American early talkie pre-Code comedy film based on the 1925 play Weak Sisters by Lynn Starling. The film stars Robert Armstrong and Barbara Kent, and features Beryl Mercer, James Gleason, and Claude Gillingwater.

== Plot ==
In a small town in Virginia, Barbara Kent, is being forced into a marriage with a missionary reformer by her socially prominent parents. Kent meets Robert Armstrong, a prizefighter, and falls in love with him. Armstrong's manager, played by James Gleason, tries to dissuade Armstrong from the relationship.

Nevertheless, Kent's grandmother, played by Beryl Mercer, and her uncle, played by Claude Gillingwater, do their best to help the romance between Kent and Armstrong. Eventually Kent and Armstrong quarrel, and this leads Kent to agree to her mother's request that she marry the missionary (Arthur Hoyt). When the missionary invites some weak sisters to a revival meeting one of them, a showgirl, accuses him of being responsible for her downfall.

Because of this, the missionary is publicly disgraced and the marriage cancelled. Gleason helps Armstrong become reconciled with Kent and they marry with the blessings of the family.

== Cast ==
- Robert Armstrong as Jerry Malone
- Barbara Kent as Faith Corey
- Beryl Mercer as Grandma Corey
- James Gleason as Mike
- Claude Gillingwater as Uncle Roger
- Julia Swayne Gordon as Mrs. Corey
- Arthur Hoyt as Siegfried Strong
- Mary Foy as Mrs. Strong
- Charlotte Merriam as Camilla

== Preservation status ==
The film is believed to be lost.

== See also ==
- List of lost films
