= Play Girl (1932 film) =

1932 film

Play-Girl
- Theatrical poster
- Directed by: Ray Enright
- Written by: Maurine Dallas Watkins; Maude Fulton (adaptation and dialogue); Brown Holmes (adaptation and dialogue)
- Based on: God's Gift to Women; 1930 story in Liberty by Frederick Hazlitt Brennan
- Produced by: Hal B. Wallis
- Starring: Winnie Lightner; Loretta Young; Norman Foster
- Cinematography: Gregg Toland
- Edited by: Owen Marks
- Music by: Leo F. Forbstein
- Production company: Warner Bros. Pictures
- Release date: March 12, 1932
- Running time: 60 minutes
- Country: United States
- Language: English

Play Girl is a 1932 American pre-Code romantic drama film starring Winnie Lightner, Loretta Young, and Norman Foster. The screenplay concerns a young woman who marries a professional gambler.

== Plot ==
Buster 'Bus' Green is a shopgirl, whose mother died giving birth to her, after her father abandoned them both. She meets Wally Dennis at the department store she works in, and taken aback by her beauty and poise, he immediately sets about courting her. He follows her to a summer camp she and her friend Georgine go to, and in spite of her resolve to never marry, he wins her over, and they wed.

She belatedly learns that, much like her father, Wally is a gambler with no steady job who can go from flush to broke very quickly. Angry at the deception, she keeps telling him she can't accept the insecurity of that lifestyle.

Learning that Buster is pregnant, Wally vows to reform, gets a job as a mechanic, but when she learns that he took 90 dollars out of their joint checking account, she assumes he bet it on a horse and tells him to leave, never come back. He walks out with the bags she packed for him, only for her to learn he'd spent the money on a fancy baby carriage, as a surprise. It's too late for her to go after him, and his gambling chums only know he's in New Orleans, no forwarding address.

She goes back to work at the department store, trying to hide her increasingly desperate situation from everyone, moving to a cheaper apartment, and starting to gamble on horses herself to make rent, particularly one called Baby Mine. This leads to her taking long lunch breaks, and she's fired from her job. Georgine, married herself now to her boyfriend Finkelwald, back from their honeymoon, offers what help she can, but Bus' due date is drawing near, and she can't afford the 500 dollars for a good hospital. She's increasingly terrified she'll meet the same fate as her mother, in the state maternity ward. She bets again on Baby Mine, who wins, but Wally's old racetrack tout Martie pockets her winnings, tells her he bet on another horse instead of her longshot.

At that moment, Wally, who has done well in New Orleans, returns, sees what his 'friend' has done, gets into a fight with Martie, which leads to a general brawl in the betting parlor. The police break in, and the officer in charge, finding out Bus' is about to give birth, gets them to the hospital, where his own wife is giving birth to twins. In spite of her and Wally's terror that something will go wrong, Bus' gives birth to a healthy daughter, then gives Wally a dirty look when he says he bets their next will be a boy. He promises her it was just an expression.

== Cast ==
- Winnie Lightner as Georgine Hicks
- Loretta Young as Buster Green Dennis
- Norman Foster as Wallace "Wallie" Dennis
- Guy Kibbee as Finkelwald
- Dorothy Burgess as Edna
- Noel Madison as Martie Happ
- James Ellison as Elmer
- Edward Van Sloan as Moffatt
- George 'Gabby' Hayes as Dance Hall Tobacconist
- Adrienne Dore as The Reno Girl (uncredited)

== Preservation status ==
It has been preserved in the Library of Congress collection since the 1970s.
