= Hold Everything (film) =

1930 film

- Theatrical release poster
- Directed by: Roy Del Ruth
- Written by: Robert Lord
- Based on: Hold Everything! by Buddy DeSylva, Ray Henderson, and John McGowan
- Starring: Winnie Lightner; Joe E. Brown
- Cinematography: Devereaux Jennings (Technicolor)
- Edited by: William Holmes
- Music by: Joseph Burke; Ray Henderson; Al Dubin; Buddy DeSylva; Lew Brown
- Color process: Technicolor Process 3
- Production company: Warner Bros. Pictures
- Distributed by: Warner Bros. Pictures
- Release dates: March 20, 1930 (US); June 3, 1930 (LDN); October 11, 1930 (AU); November 24, 1930 (UK); March 13, 1931 (IRE)
- Running time: 78 minutes
- Country: United States
- Language: English
- Budget: $491,000
- Box office: $1,333,000

Hold Everything is a 1930 American pre-Code musical comedy film directed by Roy Del Ruth, released by Warner Bros. Pictures, and photographed entirely in early two-color Technicolor. It was adapted from the DeSylva-Brown-Henderson Broadway musical of the same name that had served as a vehicle for Bert Lahr and starred Winnie Lightner and Joe E. Brown as the comedy duo. The romantic subplot was played by Georges Carpentier and Sally O'Neil. Only three songs from the stage show remained: "You're the Cream in My Coffee", "To Know You Is To Love You", and "Don't Hold Everything". New songs were written for the film by Al Dubin and Joe Burke, including one that became a hit in 1930: "When The Little Red Roses Get The Blues For You". The songs in the film were played by Abe Lyman and his orchestra.

== Plot ==
Gink Schiner is a third-rate fighter who is at the same training camp as Georges La Verne, a contender for the heavyweight championship. Although he needs to be concentrating all of his energies on the upcoming bout, Georges keeps getting distracted: Norine Lloyd, a society dame, has a distinct interest in him, but the interest is strictly one-sided. Georges prefers Sue, an old buddy and confidante. Gink has woman trouble of his own, as his flirtations do not sit at all well with Toots, his erstwhile girlfriend.

More trouble arrives when Larkin, manager of current heavyweight champ Bob Morgan, appears at the camp with the goal of fixing the fight. He is sent packing, after which he attempts to slip a Mickey Finn to the challenger—a plan which goes awry when Gink switches the drinks. Meanwhile, Gink, who is fighting in a preliminary in advance of the big fight, actually wins. Things don't look so bright for Georges, who initially gets the worst of it in his encounter with Morgan, but who eventually comes out on top.

== Cast ==
- Joe E. Brown as Gink Schiner
- Winnie Lightner as Toots Green
- Sally O'Neil as Sue Burke
- Georges Carpentier as Georges La Verne
- Edmund Breese as Pop O'Keefe
- Bert Roach as Nosey Bartlett
- Dorothy Revier as Norine Lloyd
- Jack Curtis as Murph Levy
- Tony Stabenau as Bob Morgan
- Lew Harvey as Dan Larkin
- Abe Lyman as Orchestra Leader

== Songs ==
- "When the Little Red Roses Get the Blues for You" - by Al Dubin and Joe Burke, sung by Georges Carpentier with Warner Bros. Vitaphone Stage Chorus and Orchestra under the name Frank Foster and His Chestnut Grove Orchestra
- "Take it on the Chin" - by Al Dubin and Joe Burke, sung by Winnie Lightner with Warner Bros. Vitaphone Stage Chorus and Orchestra under the name Frank Foster and His Chestnut Grove Orchestra
- "You’re the Cream in My Coffee" - by Buddy DeSylva, Lew Brown, and Ray Henderson, sung by Georges Carpentier with Warner Bros. Vitaphone Stage Chorus and Orchestra
- "Physically Fit" - by Al Dubin and Joe Burke, sung by Winnie Lightner with Warner Bros. Vitaphone Orchestra
- "Sing a Little Theme Song" - by Al Dubin and Joe Burke, sung by Georges Carpentier and Sally O'Neil with Warner Bros. Vitaphone Stage Chorus and Orchestra
- "When the Little Red Roses Get the Blues for You" - reprise; by Al Dubin and Joe Burke, sung by Warner Bros. Vitaphone Stage Chorus with Orchestra
- "To Know You is to Love You" - by Buddy DeSylva, Lew Brown, and Ray Henderson, sung by Georges Carpentier and Sally O'Neil with Warner Bros. Vitaphone Stage Chorus and Orchestra
- "Isn't this a Cock Eyed World?" - by Al Dubin and Joe Burke, sung by Winnie Lightner with Warner Bros. Vitaphone Orchestra
- Finale; Hold Everything Medley, "When the Little Red Roses Get the Blues for You" (Warner Bros. Vitaphone Stage Chorus and Orchestra)/"To Know You is to Love You" (Warner Bros. Vitaphone Stage Chorus and Orchestra)/"Don't Hold Everything" (Warner Bros. Vitaphone Stage Chorus and Orchestra)/"Physically Fit" (Warner Bros. Vitaphone Stage Chorus and Orchestra)/"Sing a Little Theme Song" (Warner Bros. Vitaphone Stage Chorus and Orchestra)

== Release ==
In 1930, this was the first film shown at the newly opened Warner Bros. Hollywood Theatre, a luxurious New York City movie palace specifically designed to showcase its then-revolutionary Vitaphone sound films. The theatre later became a legitimate Broadway venue, the Mark Hellinger Theatre, and is now the home of the Times Square Church.

=== Box office ===
According to Warner Bros. records the film earned $1,018,000 domestically and $315,000 foreign.

== Preservation status ==
While no film elements are known to exist, George Eastman Museum's 2015 book The Dawn of Technicolor, 1915-1935 falsely claimed that a black-and-white print is preserved in the Library of Congress. The full Vitaphone soundtrack remains extant.

== See also ==
- List of boxing films
- List of early color feature films
- List of early Warner Bros. sound and talking features
- List of Warner Bros. films (1930–1939)
- List of incomplete or partially lost films
- List of rediscovered films
