= Roy Del Ruth =

American filmmaker (1893–1961)

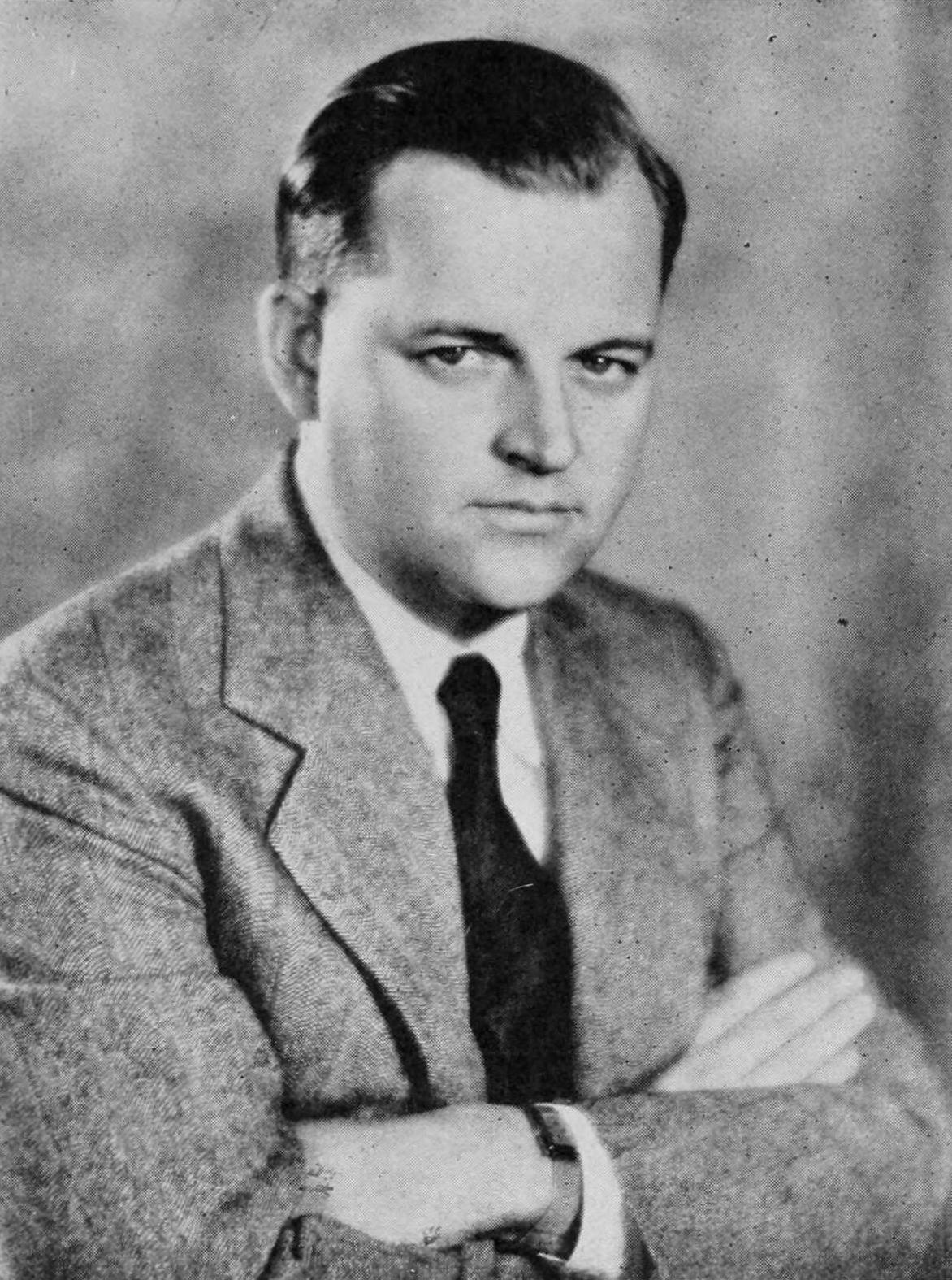
- Born: October 18, 1893; Delaware, U.S.
- Died: April 27, 1961 (aged 67); Sherman Oaks, California, U.S.
- Burial place: San Fernando Mission Cemetery
- Occupation: Filmmaker
- Years active: 1929–1961
- Spouse(s): Olive Dale; Winnie Lightner
- Children: Richard Del Ruth; Thomas Del Ruth

Roy Del Ruth (October 18, 1893 – April 27, 1961) was an American filmmaker.

== Early career ==
Silent film The Heart Snatcher (1920) directed by Roy Del Ruth for Fox Film Corporation.

Beginning his Hollywood career as a writer for Mack Sennett in 1915, Del Ruth later directed his first short film Hungry Lions (1919) for the producer. By the early 1920s, he had moved over to features including Asleep at the Switch (1923), The Hollywood Kid (1924), Eve's Lover (1925) and The Little Irish Girl (1926).

Following several more titles, many now lost, he directed The First Auto (1927), a charming look at the introduction of the first automobile to a small rural town. Also once believed lost, the film's almost entirely unsynchronised soundtrack features several elaborate sound effects for the time.

Del Ruth directed another half dozen projects before the musical The Desert Song (1929), the first color film ever released by Warner Bros. That same year, Del Ruth directed Gold Diggers of Broadway (1929), Warner's second two-strip Technicolor, all-talking feature that also became a big box office hit. Having successfully segued into the talkie era, Del Ruth directed two more two-strip color musicals, Hold Everything (1930) and The Life of the Party (1930), before directing James Cagney and Joan Blondell in the cheerfully amoral pre-Code romantic comedy-drama film, Blonde Crazy (1931).

== The 1930s and the war years ==
That same year, he directed the first version of Dashiell Hammett's novel, The Maltese Falcon (1931). Ricardo Cortez portrayed the roguish private eye whose investigation of a murder case entwines him in a plot involving unsavory people searching for a fabled, jewel-encrusted falcon. While the plot somewhat mirrors the 1941 remake, this pre-Code version features sexual innuendo, including Bebe Daniels bathing in the nude, overt references to homosexuality and one instance of cursing.

Del Ruth reunited with James Cagney for the crime drama Taxi! (1932) and then directed the comedy Blessed Event (1932) starring the fast-talking Lee Tracy.

Del Ruth subsequently oversaw such pictures as The Little Giant (1933) starring Edward G. Robinson, Lady Killer (1933) with James Cagney, Bureau of Missing Persons (1933) featuring Bette Davis, Employees' Entrance (1933) with Warren William and Loretta Young, Upper World (1934) with Ginger Rogers, and the musical comedy Kid Millions (1934) starring Eddie Cantor. He directed Ronald Colman in his second and final appearance as Bulldog Drummond in the detective mystery Bulldog Drummond Strikes Back (1934), and helmed the backstage showbiz musical Broadway Melody of 1936 (1935) for MGM, starring Jack Benny and Eleanor Powell.

After returning to the realm of crime for It Had to Happen (1936) with George Raft and Rosalind Russell, Del Ruth directed James Stewart in one of the actor's few musicals, Born to Dance (1936). He followed with the Broadway Melody of 1938 (1937), before guiding ice skating star Sonja Henie through My Lucky Star (1938) and Happy Landing (1938). Del Ruth continued churning out product for the studios, helming competent films like The Star Maker (1939), Here I Am Stranger (1939), He Married His Wife (1940) and Topper Returns (1941). After working solo on The Chocolate Soldier (1941), Maisie Gets Her Man (1942), DuBarry Was a Lady (1944) and Broadway Rhythm (1944).

== Later career ==
Del Ruth was the second highest paid director in Hollywood during the period 1932 to 1941 according to Box Office and Exhibitor magazine. Del Ruth was one of seven directors on the successful Ziegfeld Follies (1946), which featured an all-star cast of Fred Astaire, Lucille Ball, Fanny Brice, Judy Garland, Gene Kelly, Lena Horne, Red Skelton, and William Powell. From there, he helmed the cheerfully ambitious Christmas-themed comedy It Happened on 5th Avenue (1947), an appealing entertainment that was compared to It's a Wonderful Life (1946). The comedy stars Don DeFore and Ann Harding.

Del Ruth next directed The Babe Ruth Story (1948), with Babe Ruth played by William Bendix. Bending historical truths lest he offend, Del Ruth's biopic was rushed through production amidst news of the ailing Ruth's declining health. Del Ruth remained unsatisfied with the results, and the film received largely negative reviews from critics. He directed George Raft again in the noir crime drama Red Light (1949), Milton Berle and Virginia Mayo in the comedy Always Leave Them Laughing (1949), and James Cagney in the vibrant The West Point Story (1950). Two Doris Day musicals, On Moonlight Bay and Starlift (both 1951), Stop, You're Killing Me (1952) and the military musical About Face (1953) followed.

He went on to direct Jane Powell and Gordon MacRae in Three Sailors and a Girl (1953), He then took a short excursion into the initially short-lived 3D process with a horror film starring Karl Malden Phantom of the Rue Morgue (1954). Away from the director's chair for the next five years, Del Ruth returned to helm the horror picture The Alligator People (1959), a bizarre tale about humans being partially transformed into alligators in the Deep South. After his film Why Must I Die? (1960), Del Ruth retired.

== Death ==
Roy Del Ruth died on April 27, 1961, at 67 years of age from a heart attack and was interred in the San Fernando Mission Cemetery in Mission Hills, Los Angeles, California. He is buried next to his wife, actress Winnie Lightner.

== Legacy ==
For his contributions to the motion picture industry, he was awarded a star on the Hollywood Walk of Fame at 6150 Hollywood Blvd.

In 2019, Del Ruth's film Employees' Entrance was selected by the Library of Congress for preservation in the National Film Registry for being "culturally, historically, or aesthetically significant".

== Selected filmography ==
- The Cat's Meow (1924)
- Eve's Lover (1925)
- Three Weeks in Paris (1925)
- Hogan's Alley (1925)
- The Man Upstairs (1926)
- Footloose Widows (1926)
- The Little Irish Girl (1926)
- Across the Pacific (1926)
- Wolf's Clothing (1927)
- The First Auto (1927)
- If I Were Single (1927)
- Ham and Eggs at the Front (1927)
- The Terror (1928)
- Powder My Back (1928)
- Conquest (1928)
- Five and Ten Cent Annie (1928)
- Beware of Bachelors (1928)
- The Desert Song (1929)
- The Hottentot (1929)
- Gold Diggers of Broadway (1929)
- The Aviator (1929)
- Hold Everything (1930)
- The Second Floor Mystery (1930)
- Three Faces East (1930)
- The Life of the Party (1930)
- Divorce Among Friends (1930)
- My Past (1931)
- The Maltese Falcon (1931; aka Dangerous Female)
- Side Show (1931)
- Blonde Crazy (1931)
- Blessed Event (1932)
- Taxi! (1932)
- Winner Take All (1932)
- Beauty and the Boss (1932)
- Lady Killer (1933)
- The Little Giant (1933)
- Bureau of Missing Persons (1933)
- Employees' Entrance (1933)
- Captured! (1933)
- Bulldog Drummond Strikes Back (1934)
- Broadway Melody of 1936 (1935)
- Folies Bergère de Paris (1935)
- Born to Dance (1936)
- Private Number (1936)
- Broadway Melody of 1938 (1937)
- On the Avenue (1937)
- He Married His Wife (1940)
- Topper Returns (1941)
- The Chocolate Soldier (1941)
- DuBarry Was a Lady (1943)
- Ziegfeld Follies (1946)
- It Happened on 5th Avenue (1947)
- The Babe Ruth Story (1948)
- Red Light (1949)
- The West Point Story (1950)
- On Moonlight Bay (1951)
- Starlift (1951)
- Three Sailors and a Girl (1953)
- Man From 1997 (1956) (TV episode)
- The Alligator People (1959)
- Why Must I Die? (1960)
