= Dev Jennings (cinematographer) =

American cinematographer

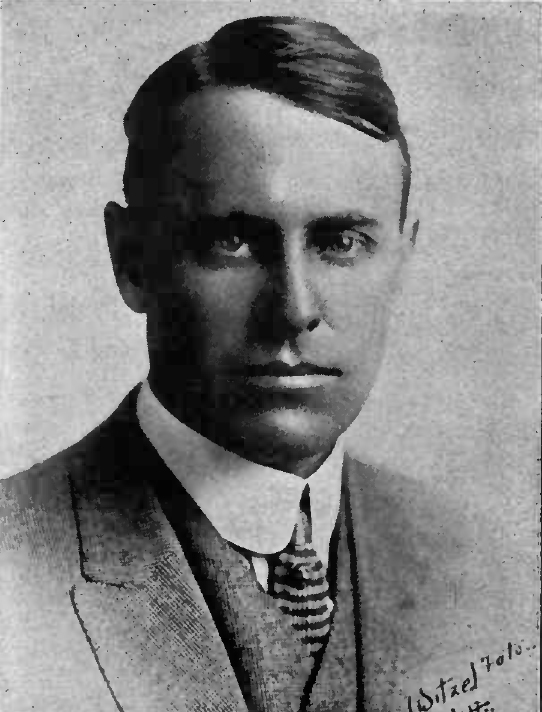
- Jennings in 1914
- Born: Devereaux Jennings; September 22, 1884; Salt Lake City, Utah
- Died: March 12, 1952 (aged 67); Hollywood, California
- Occupation: cinematographer
- Years active: 1915–1947

Devereaux "Dev" Jennings (September 22, 1884 – March 12, 1952) was an American cinematographer who was active in Hollywood primarily during the silent era. He was nominated for an Academy Award in the category Best Visual Effects for the film Unconquered.

== Select filmography ==
- Unconquered (1947)
- Born to the West (1937)
- Stranger in Town (1932)
- The Famous Ferguson Case (1931)
- Manhattan Parade (1931)
- Side Show (1931)
- The Public Enemy (1931)
- 50 Million Frenchmen (1931)
- Finn and Hattie (1931)
- Divorce Among Friends (1930)
- The Life of the Party (1930)
- Golden Dawn (1930)
- Hold Everything (1930)
- Dumbbells in Ermine (1930)
- Sally (1929)
- Vamping Venus (1928)
- Steamboat Bill, Jr. (1928)
- What Price Beauty? (1928)
- The General (1926)
- Steel Preferred (1925)
- Those Who Dare (1924)
- Children of Jazz (1923)
- The Glory of Clementina (1922)
- Madame X (1920)
- The Bride of Fear (1918)
- One Touch of Sin (1917)
- The Winged Idol (1915)
