= Claude Gillingwater =

American actor (1870–1939)

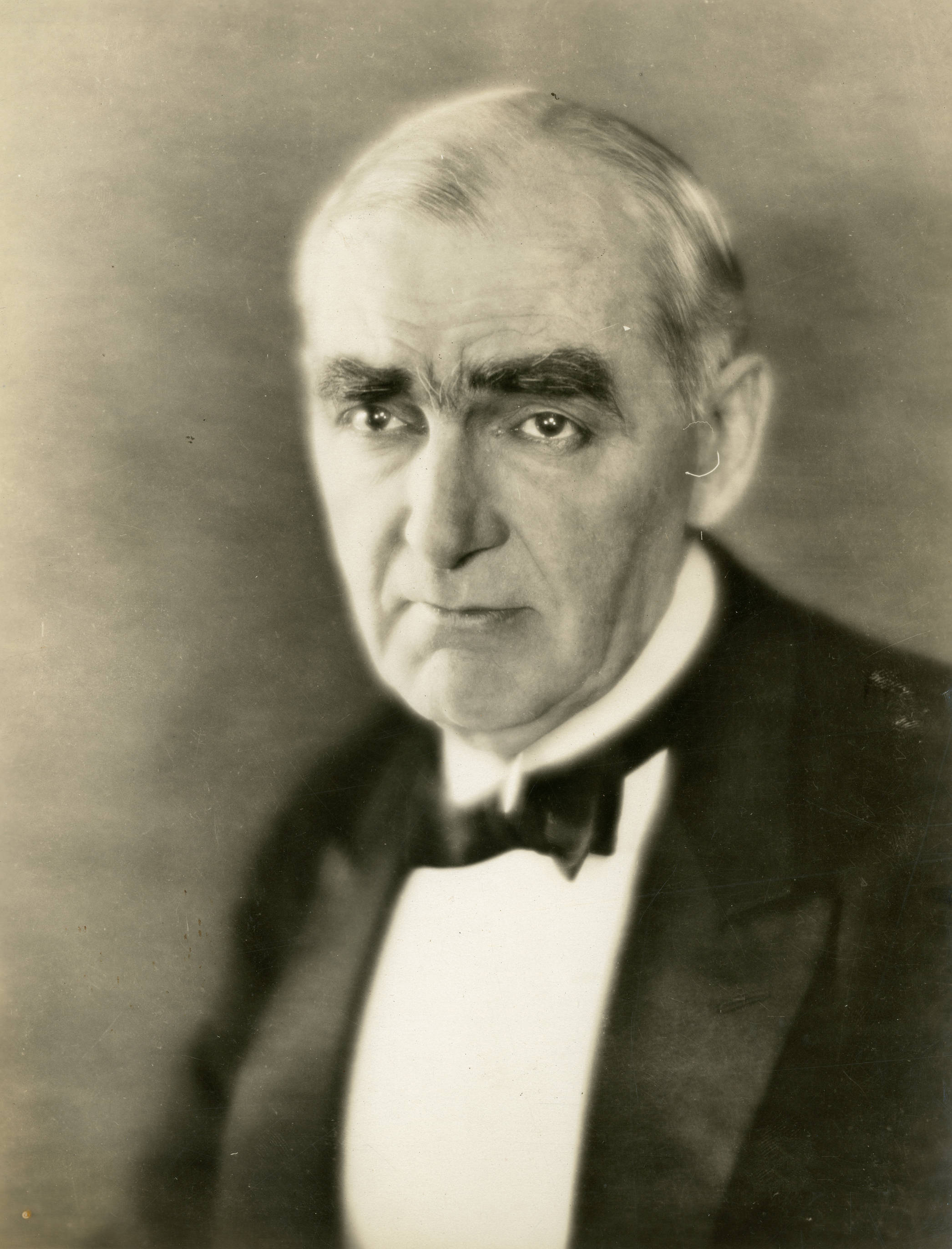
- Gillingwater in 1924
- Born: Claude Benton Gillingwater; August 2, 1870; Louisiana, Missouri, U.S.
- Died: November 1, 1939 (aged 69); Beverly Hills, California, U.S.
- Resting place: Forest Lawn Memorial Park, Glendale, California
- Occupation: Actor
- Years active: 1918–1939
- Spouse: Carlyn Kaeferle Strelitz (m. 1905; died 1937)
- Children: 1

Claude Benton Gillingwater (August 2, 1870 – November 1, 1939) was an American stage and screen actor. He first appeared on the stage then in more than 90 films between 1918 and 1939, including the Academy Award-nominated A Tale of Two Cities (1935) and Conquest (1937). He appeared in several films starring Shirley Temple, beginning with Poor Little Rich Girl (1936).

== Early life ==
Gillingwater was born in Louisiana, Missouri. Though he studied law, he preferred not to follow in his father's footsteps and become a lawyer. He became a travelling salesman for a wholesale firm, selling vinegar. While thus engaged, he joined a small theatrical company managed by David Belasco. Eight years later, Mary Pickford saw him act and secured him for her picture, Little Lord Fauntleroy (1921), which launched his film career.

== Hollywood career ==
In later years, Gillingwater generally played curmudgeonly character roles. His best-known role is probably Jarvis Lorry in David O. Selznick's production of A Tale of Two Cities (1935). He also appeared in Mississippi (1935), The Prisoner of Shark Island (1936) and A Yank at Oxford (1938). He proved to be an excellent crabapple foil for 20th Century Fox moppet star Shirley Temple in Poor Little Rich Girl (1936) and subsequently appeared in Just Around the Corner (1938) and Little Miss Broadway (1938).

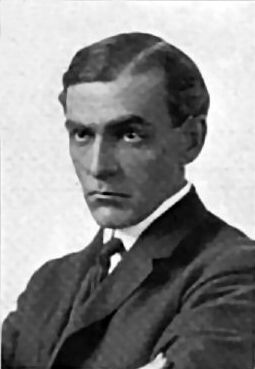
Claude Gillingwater (The Actor's Birthday Book, 1906)

== Later years and death ==
In February, 1936, while filming Florida Special (1936) at Paramount studios, he fell from a platform, resulting in a severe back injury from which he never fully recovered. His general health began to decline and his career was threatened. This, along with the death of his wife Carlyn in April 1937, left him extremely depressed.

On November 1, 1939, a housekeeper found Gillingwater dead, sitting in a chair inside a closet of his Beverly Hills, California home from a self-inflicted bullet wound to the chest. A suicide note stated he was worried about his failing health and the possibility of becoming an invalid. He did not want to become a burden to anyone, so he chose to take his own life. The death of the 69-year-old actor was officially ruled a suicide. His cremated remains were interred at the Columbarium of Prayer, Niche 10628, in The Great Mausoleum at Forest Lawn Memorial Park, Glendale, California.

His son, Claude Gillingwater, Jr., was also an actor.

== Partial filmography ==
- Wild Primrose (1918) - Standish
- Little Lord Fauntleroy (1921) - Earl of Dorincourt
- My Boy (1921) - The Captain
- Fools First (1922) - Denton Drew
- The Dust Flower (1922) - Steptoe
- Remembrance (1922) - John P. Grout
- The Strangers' Banquet (1922) - Uncle Sam
- The Christian (1923) - Lord Storm
- Crinoline and Romance (1923) - Col. Charles E. Cavanaugh
- Alice Adams (1923) - Virgil Adams
- Three Wise Fools (1923) - Theodore Findley
- Dulcy (1923) - Mr. Forbes
- A Chapter in Her Life (1923) - Mr. Everingham
- Tiger Rose (1923) - Hector McCollins
- Souls for Sale (1923) - Himself (uncredited)
- Daddies (1924) - James Crockett
- How to Educate a Wife (1924) - Henry Bancks
- Madonna of the Streets (1924) - Lord Patrington
- Idle Tongues (1924) - Judge Daniel Webster Copeland
- A Thief in Paradise (1925) - Noel Jardine
- Cheaper to Marry (1925) - Riddle
- Winds of Chance (1925) - Tom Linton
- Seven Sinners (1925) - 'Pious Joe' McDowell
- We Moderns (1925) - Sir Robert Sundale
- Wages for Wives (1925) - Jim Bailey
- That's My Baby (1926) - John Raynor
- Into Her Kingdom (1926) - Ivan (their tutor)
- For Wives Only (1926) - Professor von Waldstein
- 45 Minutes from Hollywood (1926, Short) - Old Man in Hotel Bed (uncredited)
- Fast and Furious (1927) - Smithfield
- Naughty but Nice (1927) - Judge J. R. Altewood
- Barbed Wire (1927) - Jean Moreau
- The Gorilla (1927) - Cyrus Townsend
- Husbands for Rent (1927) - Sir Reginald Knight
- The Little Shepherd of Kingdom Come (1928) - Major Buford
- Women They Talk About (1928) - Grandfather Mervin
- Oh, Kay! (1928) - Judge Appleton
- Stark Mad (1929) - James Rutherford - Expedition Leader
- Stolen Kisses (1929) - H.A. Lambert Sr.
- Glad Rag Doll (1929) - Sam Underlane
- Smiling Irish Eyes (1929) - Michael O'Connor
- The Great Divide (1929) - Winthrop Amesbury
- So Long Letty (1929) - Uncle Claude Davis
- Dumbbells in Ermine (1930) - Uncle Roger
- The Flirting Widow (1930) - Faraday
- Kiss Me Again (1931) - Count de St. Cyr
- Illicit (1931) - Ives Sr.
- The Conquering Horde (1931) - Jim Nabours
- Daddy Long Legs (1931) - Riggs
- Gold Dust Gertie (1931) - John Aberdeen Arnold
- Compromised (1931) - John Brock
- Tess of the Storm Country (1932) - Frederick Garfield Sr
- Ann Carver's Profession (1933) - Judge Bingham
- The Avenger (1933) - Witt
- Skyway (1933) - John Beaumont
- I Loved a Woman (1933) - Banker (uncredited)
- Before Midnight (1933) - John Fry
- You Can't Buy Everything (1934) - Banker Asa Cabot
- The Show-Off (1934) - J.B. Preston
- City Limits (1934) - Oliver
- Unknown Blonde (1934) - Papa Van Brunt, Sr.
- In Love with Life (1934) - Morley
- Green Eyes (1934) - Steven Kester
- Back Page (1934) - Sam Webster
- The Captain Hates the Sea (1934) - Judge Griswold
- Broadway Bill (1934) - J.P. Chase
- Strange Wives (1934) - Guggins
- The Woman in Red (1935) - Grandpa Wyatt
- Mississippi (1935) - General Rumford
- Baby Face Harrington (1935) - Colton
- Calm Yourself (1935) - Col. Allenby
- Together We Live (1935) - Dick
- A Tale of Two Cities (1935) - Jarvis Lorry Jr.
- The Prisoner of Shark Island (1936) - Col. Jeremiah Milford Dyer
- Florida Special (1936) - Simeon Stafford
- Counterfeit (1936) - Tom Perkins
- Ticket to Paradise (1936) - Robert Forbes
- Poor Little Rich Girl (1936) - Simon Peck
- Wives Never Know (1936) - Mr. Gossamer
- Can This Be Dixie? (1937) - Col. Robert Peachtree
- Top of the Town (1937) - William Borden
- Conquest (1937) - Stephan (Marie's servant)
- A Yank at Oxford (1938) - Ben Dalton
- Little Miss Broadway (1938) - Judge
- There Goes My Heart (1938) - Cyrus Butterfield
- Just Around the Corner (1938) - Samuel G. Henshaw
- Cafe Society (1939) - Old Christopher West
