= The Aviator (1929 film) =

1929 film

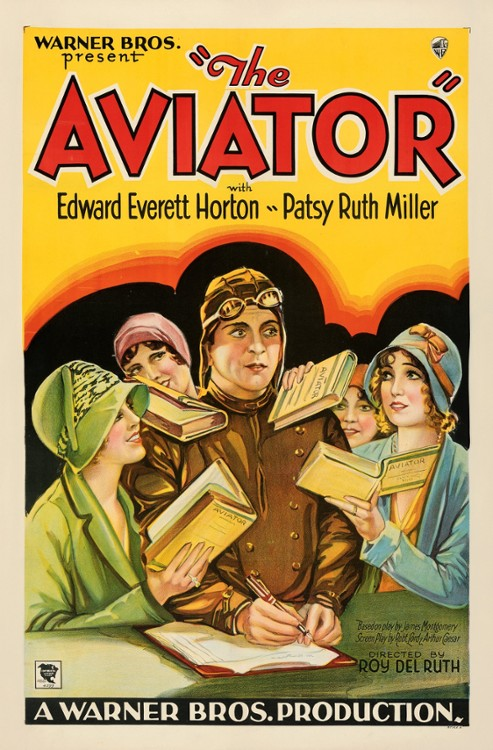
- Theatrical release poster
- Directed by: Roy Del Ruth
- Written by: Arthur Caesar; Robert Lord; De Leon Anthony (titles)
- Based on: The Aviator (play) by James Montgomery
- Produced by: Irving Asher
- Starring: Edward Everett Horton; Patsy Ruth Miller
- Cinematography: Chick McGill (aka Barney McGill)
- Edited by: William Holmes
- Music by: Rex Dunn (uncredited)
- Production company: Warner Bros. Pictures
- Distributed by: Warner Bros. Pictures
- Release date: December 14, 1929
- Running time: 75 minutes
- Country: United States
- Language: English

The Aviator is a 1929 American sound (All-Talking) pre-Code Vitaphone comedy film produced and released by Warner Bros. Pictures. Directed by Roy Del Ruth, the film was based on the play of the same name by James Montgomery and stars Edward Everett Horton and Patsy Ruth Miller. The Aviator is similar to the silent comedy The Hottentot (1922), where a hapless individual has to pretend to be a famous steeplehorse jockey. The Aviator today is considered a lost film.

== Plot ==
Robert Street, a celebrated but mild-mannered author, is approached by his publisher Brooks and press agent Brown with a bold publicity stunt: to lend his name to a new book of wartime aviation exploits written by an unknown flyer, thus ensuring greater sales. Though Street has no love for aviation and hasn't even read the manuscript, he reluctantly agrees. The book becomes a sensation, and Street is soon the toast of the town—wined, dined, and hounded for tales of daring aerial exploits he never actually performed.

Hoping to escape the growing pressure, Street flees to the upscale Berkshire Inn with his loyal valet Hobart. However, Brown, ever the publicity hound, arrives ahead of him and begins spreading more fantastic stories of Street's aviation heroism. Among the guests at the hotel are John Douglas and his daughter Grace Douglas, old friends of Street's who are impressed by what they believe is his quiet modesty regarding his wartime record. Grace and Street have long shared a mutual affection.

Also staying at the inn is Major Jules Gaillard, a charismatic and highly skilled French aviator. Introduced to Street by hotel proprietor Gordon, Gaillard is intrigued but skeptical of the acclaimed author-aviator. At Brown's urging, Street poses for publicity photos in one of Gaillard's planes. Startled by a flashbulb explosion during the shoot, Street accidentally grips the throttle and sends the plane lurching into the air. Guests interpret the erratic takeoff and panicked maneuvers as deliberate stunts, cheering his supposed daring. Eventually, Street crash-lands in a haystack, unharmed, but Brown hides the truth from the awe-struck guests.

To capitalize on the excitement, the guests propose an aerial stunt contest between Street and Major Gaillard. Terrified but cornered by his own false reputation, Street agrees. Brown secretly sends for a flight instructor to substitute for Street in the air, but due to unavailability, the only person sent is Sam Robinson, a mechanic. With no flying experience himself, Robinson attempts to give Street a crash course in aeronautics in his hotel room.

Meanwhile, Jules provides the contest planes—two of his own—and Brown desperately tries to prevent disaster. He approaches Grace and confesses that Street is no pilot. Misunderstanding Brown's intention, Grace instead confronts Jules, asking him to back out of the contest so Street can save face. Insulted, Jules punches Brown and prepares for the duel in the air.

As a last-ditch effort, Brown tries to have the sheriff intervene on the grounds that Street lacks a pilot's license—only to discover that Jules has already secured one for him. Robinson, hoping to sabotage the flight safely, loosens the wheels on Street's plane.

Jules takes off first, performing flawless maneuvers. When Street taxies across the field in the tampered aircraft, the wheels drop off shortly after liftoff. In a flailing panic, Street unwittingly performs a series of death-defying tricks that leave the onlookers breathless. Believing himself to be in real danger, Jules decides it's too reckless to continue and lands, forfeiting the contest.

Street finally brings his plane down—directly into the branches of a treetop—but emerges without a scratch. To everyone else, he has cemented his status as an aerial daredevil.

Grace, both terrified and relieved, tearfully begs him never to fly again. Street wholeheartedly agrees, and the two embrace as their romance takes flight—on solid ground.

== Cast ==
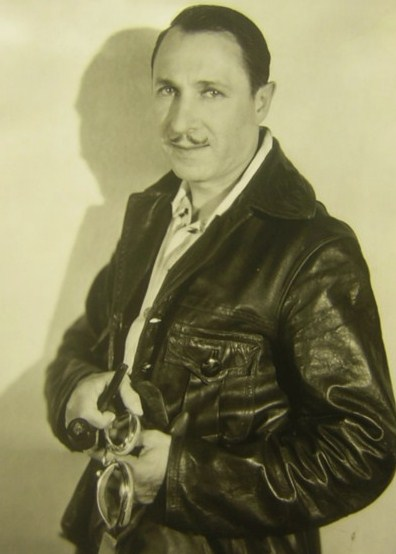
Parisian-born Armand Kaliz as Major Jules Gaillard.

- Edward Everett Horton as Robert Street
- Patsy Ruth Miller as Grace Douglas
- Johnny Arthur as Hobart
- William Norton Bailey as Brooks
- Armand Kaliz as Major Jules Gaillard
- Edward Martindel as Gordon
- Lee Moran as Brown
- Kewpie Morgan as Sam Robinson
- Phillips Smalley as John Douglas

== Production ==
The Aviator appeared at a time when aviation films were extremely popular, with only western films being made in larger numbers. It was typical to even have aircraft show up in a western. Blending comedy in The Aviator with aerial thrills seemed to be an ideal way to satisfy the public's appetite for aviation subjects.

== Reception ==
The Aviator was well received as both a comedy and an aviation film. Hal Erickson wrote, "The ensuing wild ride through the air is the best part of the picture, with Robert trying to maintain his equilibrium and dignity throughout."

The film was remade in 1930 as Going Wild, starring Joe E. Brown. A foreign-language version in French was made in 1931 and was entitled L'aviateur. In 1938, eight years after Going Wild, Warner Bros. remade this movie again as a musical titled Going Places, starring Dick Powell (impersonating a famous horseman), with Ronald Reagan appearing in an early role.

== Preservation ==
No film elements of The Aviator are known to survive. The soundtrack, which was recorded on Vitaphone disks, may survive in private hands.

On February 13, 1956, Jack Warner sold the rights to all of his pre-1950 films to Associated Artists Productions. It does not appear to have been shown on television or reissued.

== See also ==
- List of lost films
- List of early sound feature films (1926–1929)
- List of early Warner Bros. sound and talking features
