= She Had to Say Yes =

1933 film by Busby Berkeley, George Amy

She Had To Say Yes
- Theatrical release poster
- Directed by: George Amy; Busby Berkeley
- Written by: John Francis Larkin (story "Customer's Girl"); Rian James; Don Mullally
- Starring: Loretta Young; Winnie Lightner; Lyle Talbot; Regis Toomey
- Cinematography: Arthur L. Todd
- Edited by: George Amy
- Music by: Leo F. Forbstein
- Distributed by: First National Pictures
- Release date: July 15, 1933
- Running time: 63 minutes
- Country: United States
- Language: English

She Had To Say Yes is a 1933 American pre-Code drama film directed by George Amy and Busby Berkeley. It was Berkley's directorial debut. Loretta Young stars as a secretary who receives unwanted sexual advances when she is sent out on dates with her employer's clients. The film was promoted with the teaser "We apologize to the men for the many frank revelations made by this picture, but we just had to show it as it was filmed. The true story of the working girl."

According to pre-Code scholar Thomas Doherty, it was part of a series of movies that drew inspiration from the "real-life compromises working girls made to get and retain employment" during the Great Depression. A repeated theme in women's pictures in the Depression was the "threat of sexual violation" and the "hard necessity of risking virtue to keep a paycheck". Women of that time were often subjected to sexual harassment, and had to endure indignities in a highly competitive job market. The film received a negative review in The New York Times when it was released.

== Plot ==
Sol Glass owns a clothing manufacturing company struggling to survive in the midst of the Great Depression. Like his competitors, Glass employs "customer girls" to entertain out-of-town buyers. However, his clients have become tired of his hard-bitten "gold diggers" and have started taking their business elsewhere. Tommy Nelson, one of his salesmen, suggests that they use their stenographers instead. Glass decides to give it a try.

When buyer Luther Haines sees Tommy's secretary and fiancée, Florence "Flo" Denny, he wants to take her out. However, Tommy manages to steer him to the curvaceous Birdie instead. Later, with Birdie sick, Tommy reluctantly lets Flo go on a date with another buyer, Daniel "Danny" Drew. They have a nice time together, but she is shocked when she finds out Danny expects sex. A contrite Danny apologizes and tells her that he has fallen in love with her. He has to go on a business trip, but telephones and writes to her regularly.

Meanwhile, Flo's friend, fellow employee and roommate, Maizee, shows her that Tommy is cheating on her with Birdie. She ends their engagement.

To keep her self-respect, Flo tells Glass that she will not go out with any more buyers. When he threatens to fire her, she quits.

Danny returns and takes Flo to dinner. Then, spotting Haines at another table, he asks her to help convince the last holdout to a merger to sign an important contract, the biggest deal of his life. She is disappointed by his request, but agrees to do it. She goes to dinner with Haines, but cleverly arranges with Maizee to have Haines' wife and daughter show up. Haines has to go along with the pretense that he is conducting business, and signs the contract.

When Haines later complains about Flo's methods, and claims that she and Tommy are living together, Daniel suspects that she is not as innocent as he believed, so he drives her out into the country to the mansion of his friends. Nobody is home, but he coaxes her inside and tries to force himself on her. Flo tries to get away, but finally stops resisting. However, when she asks him if that is all she means to him, Danny stops before anything happens. She leaves, only to run into Tommy, who had followed the couple. He also believes she is selling herself. Danny, overhearing their conversation, realizes that Flo is innocent, and forces Tommy to apologize. Danny begs her to marry him. After she whispers in his ear, he picks her up and carries her back into the mansion.

== Cast ==
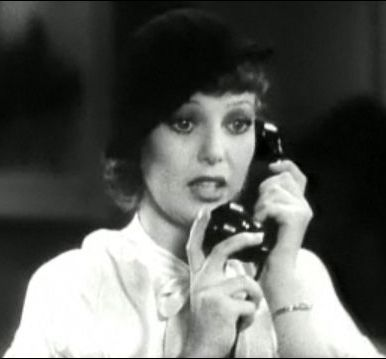
Young in the film's trailer

- Loretta Young as Florence Denny
- Winnie Lightner as Maizee
- Lyle Talbot as Daniel Drew
- Regis Toomey as Tommy Nelson
- Hugh Herbert as Luther Haines
- Ferdinand Gottschalk as Sol Glass
- Suzanne Kilborn as Birdie Reynolds
- Helen Ware as Mrs. Haines
- George Chandler as Taxi Driver

== Reception ==
Writing for The New York Times, Frank S. Nugent gave the film a mostly negative review, primarily due to the constant suspicions the two male leads have about Young's character when the film makes it fairly obvious from the beginning that Young's character is virtuous. Nugent added: "The unfortunate part of it is that the picture has some bright lines and threatens, here and there, actually to become amusing. Hugh Herbert and Winnie Lightner wheedled a few laughs from the stranded Strand visitors, but the gayety was short-lived. It would have been a relief to every one if Miss Young had only said "No!"

== See also ==
- Pre-Code sex films
