= Gold Dust Gertie =

1931 film

- Directed by: Lloyd Bacon
- Written by: W.K. Wells; Ray Enright; Arthur Caesar
- Based on: The Wife of the Party play by Len D. Hollister
- Starring: Winnie Lightner; Ole Olsen; Chic Johnson; Claude Gillingwater
- Cinematography: James Van Trees
- Edited by: Harold McLernon
- Music by: Leo F. Forbstein; Herbert Taylor; Cecil Copping; David Mendoza
- Distributed by: Warner Bros. Pictures
- Release date: June 27, 1931
- Running time: 65 minutes
- Language: English

Gold Dust Gertie is a 1931 American pre-Code musical comedy produced and released by Warner Bros. Pictures. It was originally completed as a full musical. Due to the backlash against musicals, however, all the songs were cut from the film in all release prints in the United States. The film was originally known as Red Hot Sinners, but was released as Gold Dust Gertie after the musical numbers had been cut. The film was based on the play The Wife of the Party by Len D. Hollister. The film stars Winnie Lightner, Ole Olsen, Chic Johnson and Claude Gillingwater.

== Plot ==
Gertie Dale is a gold digger who marries men only to divorce them and collect alimony. She marries George Harlan in 1927, divorces him, and then marries his friend Elmer Guthrie and also divorces him. By 1930, both men have remarried but they continue paying alimony to Dale without the knowledge of their current wives. When they are both late with their payment, Dale shows up at their work. The men work at a firm that designs women's sportwear. Their boss, John Arnold, is very old fashioned and insists on designing women's bathing suits that are so modest that they end up resembling the models from twenty years ago. Because of this, the business is doing poorly and the men are low on cash at the moment. Dale, seeing that she currently has no chance of collecting from her ex-husbands at the moment, decides to vamp their boss. Dale eventually convinces Arnold to liberalize his views. Dale designs a new modern bathing suit which ends up winning an award. Arnold falls in love with Dale and proposes marriage and she accepts, but problems soon arise. As they are celebrating their engagement another ex-husband shows up and, taking pity on Arnold, he attempts to warn him. Furthermore, the minister who Arnold has chosen to officiate at their wedding knows all about Dale's ex-husbands and her gold digging schemes.

== Cast ==
- Winnie Lightner as Gertrude 'Gertie' Dale
- Ole Olsen as George Harlan
- Chic Johnson as Elmer Guthrie
- Dorothy Christy as Mabel Guthrie
- Claude Gillingwater as John Aberdeen Arnold
- Arthur Hoyt as Dr. Rodman Tate, the Minister
- George Byron as Captain Osgood
- Vivien Oakland as Lucille Harlan
- Charley Grapewin as Nicholas Hautrey
- Charles Judels as Monsieur Pestalozzi
- Virginia Sale as Secretary Modelling Skimpy Bathing Suit

== Preservation ==
Only the cut print released in the United States seems to have survived at the Library of Congress. The complete film was released intact in countries outside the United States where a backlash against musicals never occurred. It is unknown whether a copy of this full version still exists.
