= For Wives Only =

1926 film

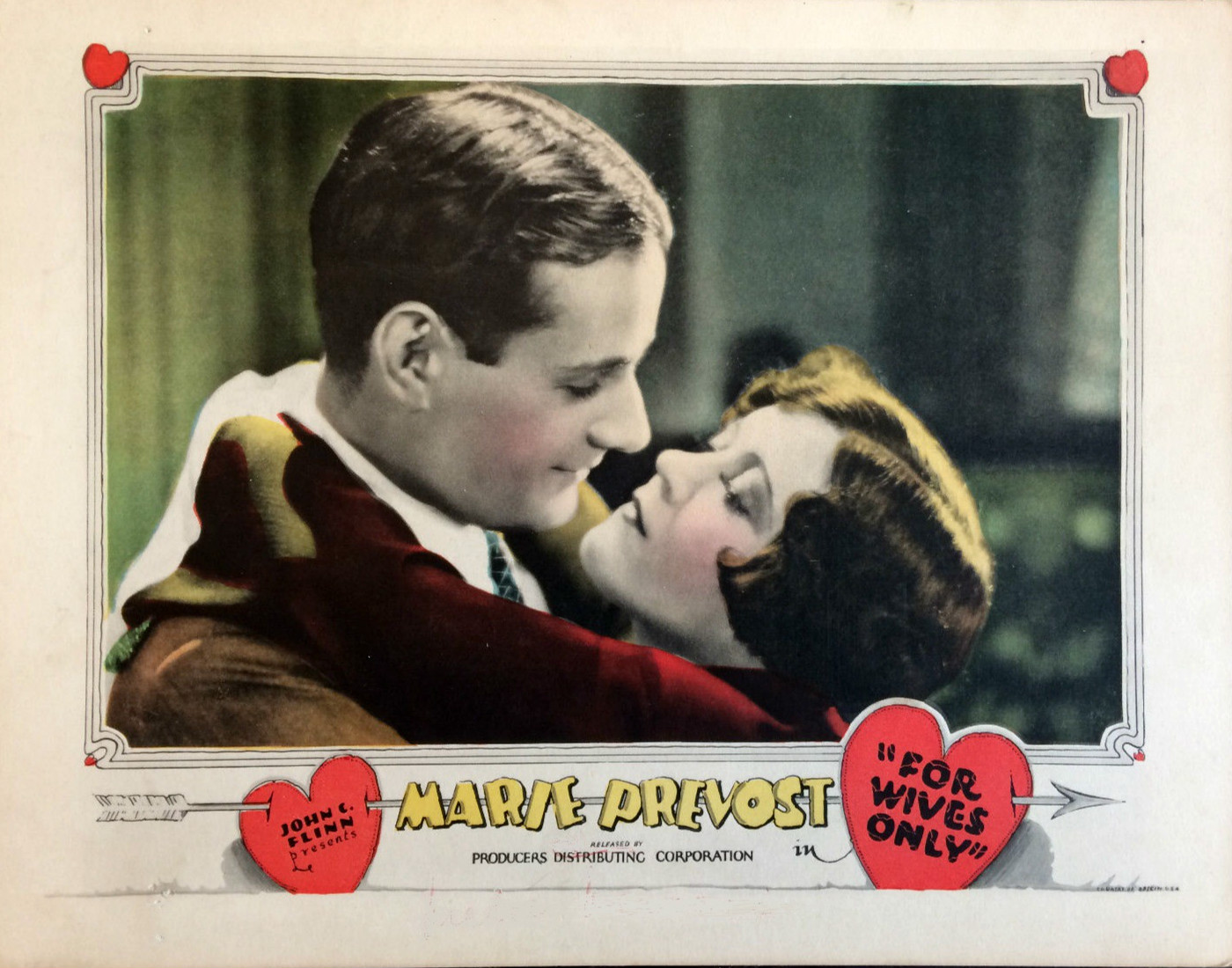
- Directed by: Victor Heerman
- Written by: Anthony Coldeway
- Based on: The Critical Year by Hans Backwitz and Rudolph Lothar
- Produced by: John C. Flinn
- Starring: Marie Prevost; Victor Varconi; Charles K. Gerrard
- Cinematography: Harold Rosson
- Edited by: F. McGrew Willis
- Production company: Metropolitan Pictures Corporation of California
- Distributed by: Producers Distributing Corporation
- Release date: November 8, 1926
- Running time: 60 minutes
- Country: United States
- Language: Silent (English intertitles)

For Wives Only is a 1926 American silent comedy film directed by Victor Heerman and starring Marie Prevost, Victor Varconi, and Charles K. Gerrard.

== Plot ==
Dr. Josef Rittenhaus, a well-liked physician in Vienna's upper class, is asked by his friend Waldstein to consider a proposal from Countess von Nessa to donate funds and land for a new sanitarium. Meanwhile, Rittenhaus's wife, Laura, feeling neglected, finds herself in the company of Carl Tanzer, who she rejects despite his advances. Laura attempts to incite jealousy in her husband with a fake letter, but her plan fails. Later, while evading unwanted attention from another man, she encounters Fritz Schwerman, a friend of her husband's, and agrees to have lunch with him. Meanwhile, Laura tries to impress her husband's friends at a card game, while the countess makes advances towards Rittenhaus. Disgusted by the situation, Rittenhaus returns home and reconciles happily with his wife.

== Cast ==
- Marie Prevost as Laura Rittenhaus
- Victor Varconi as Dr. Rittenhaus
- Charles K. Gerrard as Dr. Carl Tanzer
- Arthur Hoyt as Dr. Fritz Schwerman
- Claude Gillingwater as Professor von Waldstein
- Josephine Crowell as Housekeeper
- Dorothy Cumming as Countess von Nessa
- William Courtright as Butler

== Preservation ==
A print of For Wives Only is listed as being in the collection of the Cinematheque Royale de Belgique.

== Bibliography ==
- Munden, Kenneth White. The American Film Institute Catalog of Motion Pictures Produced in the United States, Part 1. University of California Press, 1997.
