= Winnie Lightner =

American actress

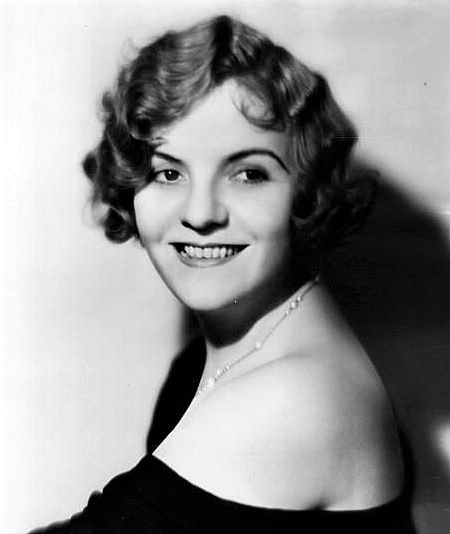
- Lightner in 1930
- Born: Winifred Josephine Reeves; September 17, 1899; Greenport, New York, U.S.
- Died: March 5, 1971 (aged 71); Sherman Oaks, California, U.S.
- Resting place: San Fernando Mission Cemetery, Mission Hills, Los Angeles County California US
- Years active: 1922–1934
- Spouses: Roy Del Ruth (m. 1934; died 1961)
- Children: Richard Lightner; Thomas Del Ruth

Winnie Lightner (born Winifred Josephine Reeves; September 17, 1899 – March 5, 1971) was an American stage and motion picture actress.

Perhaps best known as the man-hungry Mabel in Gold Diggers of Broadway (1929), Lightner was often typecast as a wise-cracking gold-digger and was known for her talents as a comedian and singer. She is also noted for introducing the song "Singin' in the Bathtub" in the 1929 motion picture The Show of Shows.

== Life and career ==
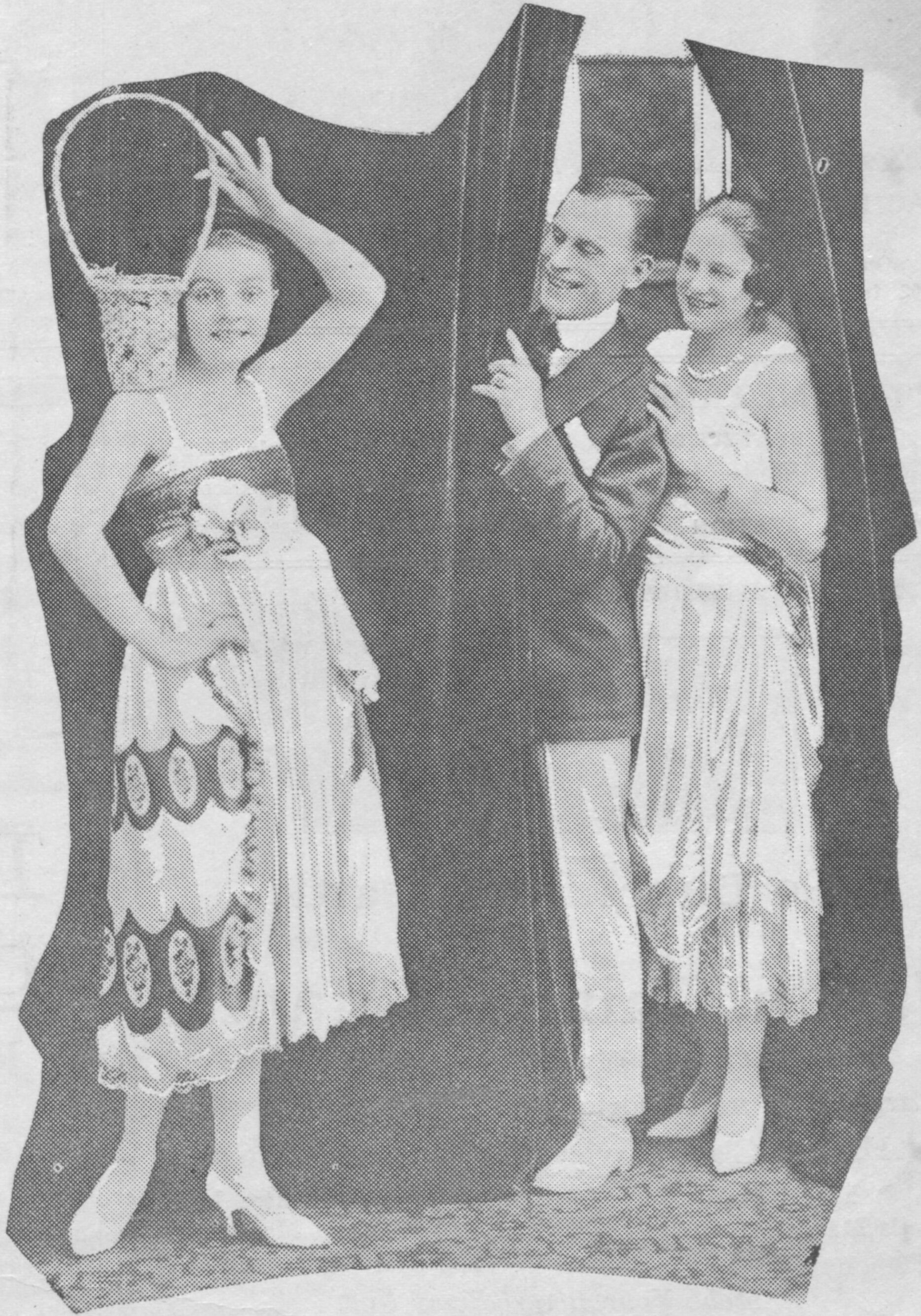
As a young vaudevillian, Lightner (left) partnered with the longtime vaudeville team of Theodora Lightner (from whom she took her stage surname) and Newton Alexander

Also known as Winifred Hansen (using the last name of her foster family), she started off in vaudeville at age fifteen and adopting Winnie Lightner as her stage name, she was an immediate success and played the fabled Palace theater in New York City only three months after beginning her career.

With vaudeville in decline in the early 1920s, she switched to Broadway revues, where she starred in George White's Scandals of 1922, 1923, and 1924, in Gay Paree in 1925 and 1926, and in Harry Delmar's Revels in 1927.

In 1927, she made a Fox Movietone short, and in 1928, she made a Vitaphone short called "The Song a Minute Girl" in which she sang "Heaven Help a Sailor on a Night Like This", "Raise Myself a Papa", and "We Love It", as well as another short called "Winnie Lightner: Broadway’s Favorite" in which she sang "That Brand New Model of Mine", and "We've Got a Lot to Learn". A censorship board in Pennsylvania held up the release of "The Song a Minute Girl" because of the content of Lightner's songs. According to film historian Alexander Walker, "Warners asked the censors to merely pass judgment on the visuals – the censors refused."

The musical Gold Diggers of Broadway was a 1929 triumph and made her a star. Warner Bros. quickly signed her up for additional films. The first of these was She Couldn't Say No (1930), in which Lightner was cast in a maudlin dramatic role that did not suit her talents. This was followed by Hold Everything, a lavish all-Technicolor musical comedy that was a huge hit. It was followed by another highly successful picture, The Life of the Party, which was also shot entirely in Technicolor but from which most of the songs were cut prior to release.

By the end of 1930, audiences had grown tired of musicals, while Lightner was in the process of shooting three of them: Sit Tight (1931), Gold Dust Gertie (1931), and Manhattan Parade (1932). They all were released with most of the music cut. This was especially noticeable on Manhattan Parade, in which even the background music was completely removed.

In response to the changes in public tastes, Warner Bros. decided to try another dramatic role for Lightner; the result was a picture called Side Show (1931) which proved to be unsuccessful. She appeared in two more comedies, in which she co-starred with Loretta Young – without songs – before she left Warner Bros. In the first of these, Play Girl (1932), she was billed with her name above the title, but in the second, She Had to Say Yes (1933), Young received first billing.

== Family ==
Lightner was the mother of multiple-Emmy-award-winning cinematographer Thomas Del Ruth and was married to film director Roy Del Ruth until his death in 1961. She died in 1971, aged 71, and was interred in the San Fernando Mission Cemetery.

== Filmography ==
Year	Title	Role	Notes
1927	Winnie Lightner Singing Two Songs: Nagasaki Butterfly and Everybody Loves My Girl	herself	Short film, lost
1928	Winnie Lightner, the Song a Minute Girl	herself	Short film, lost
1928	Winnie Lightner, Broadway’s Favorite	herself	Short film, lost
1929	Gold Diggers of Broadway	Mabel Munroe	Incomplete film
1929	The Show of Shows	Performer in "Pingo Pongo" & "Singing in the Bathtub" Numbers	
1930	She Coundn't Say No	Winnie Harper	Lost film
1930	Hold Everything	Toots Green	Lost film
1930	The Life of the Party	Flo	Cut black-and-white print survives, full Technicolor version is lost
1931	Sit Tight	Winnie	Cut black-and-white print survives, full Technicolor version is lost
1931	The Stolen Jools	herself	Short
1931	Gold Dust Gertie	Gertrude "Gertie" Dale	Cut print survives, full version is lost
1931	Side Show	Pat	Cut print survives, full version is lost
1931	Manhattan Parade	Doris Roberts	Cut black-and-white print survives, full Technicolor version is lost
1932	Play Girl	Georgine Hicks	
1933	She Had to Say Yes	Maizee	
1933	Dancing Lady	Rosette LaRue	
1934	I'll Fix It	Elizabeth	(final film role)
