= Charles Butterworth (actor) =

American actor (1896–1946)

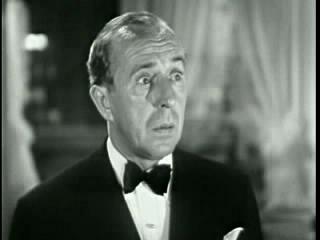
- Butterworth in Second Chorus (1940)
- Born: July 26, 1896; South Bend, Indiana, U.S.
- Died: June 14, 1946 (aged 49); Los Angeles, California, U.S.
- Resting place: St. Joseph Valley Memorial Park, Granger, Indiana
- Other name: Charlie Butterworth
- Occupations: Stage and film actor
- Years active: 1926–1944
- Spouse: Ethel Kenyon (m. 1932; div. 1939)

Charles Edward Butterworth (July 26, 1896 – June 14, 1946) was an American actor specializing in comedic roles, often in musicals. His distinctive voice was the inspiration for the Cap'n Crunch commercials created by the Jay Ward studio: voice actor Daws Butler.

== Early life ==
Butterworth was the son of a physician in South Bend, Indiana. He graduated from the University of Notre Dame in 1924 with a law degree.

== Career ==
After graduating, Butterworth became a newspaper reporter at the South Bend News-Times and subsequently Chicago.

One of Butterworth's more memorable film roles was in the Irving Berlin musical This Is the Army (1943) as bugle-playing Private Eddie Dibble. He was generally a supporting actor, though he had top billing in We Went to College (1936) and the title role in Baby Face Harrington (1935), and shared top billing (as the Sultan) with Ann Corio in The Sultan's Daughter (1944). In his obituary, he was described as "characterizing the man who could not make up his mind".

He is credited with the quip "Why don't you slip out of those wet clothes and into a dry martini?" from Every Day's a Holiday. In Forsaking All Others, when Clark Gable, quoting Benjamin Franklin, said, "Early to bed, early to rise, makes a man healthy, wealthy and wise," Butterworth replied, "Ever take a good look at a milkman?"

== Death ==
Butterworth had a home in Palm Springs, California. He was killed in an automobile accident on June 13, 1946, when he lost control of his car on Sunset Boulevard in Los Angeles. He died en route to the hospital.

== Legacy ==
For his contributions to the film industry, Butterworth was posthumously inducted into the Hollywood Walk of Fame in 1960 with a motion pictures star at 7036 Hollywood Boulevard.

== Partial filmography ==
- Vital Subjects (1929, Short)
- Ladies of Leisure (1930) – Party Guest (uncredited)
- The Life of the Party (1930) – Colonel Joy
- Illicit (1931) – Georgie Evans
- The Bargain (1931) – Geoffrey
- Side Show (1931) – Sidney
- The Mad Genius (1931) – Karimsky
- Manhattan Parade (1931) – Herbert T. Herbert
- Beauty and the Boss (1932) – Ludwig Pfeffer Jr.
- Love Me Tonight (1932) – Count de Savignac
- The Nuisance (1933) – Floppy Phil Montague
- Penthouse (1933) – Layton
- My Weakness (1933) – Gerald Gregory
- The Cat and the Fiddle (1934) – Charles
- Hollywood Party (1934) – Harvey Clemp
- Bulldog Drummond Strikes Back (1934) – Algy 'Mousey' Longworth
- Student Tour (1934) – Ethelred Lippincott – Professor of Philosophy
- Forsaking All Others (1934) – Shemp
- The Night Is Young (1935) – Willy Fitch
- Baby Face Harrington (1935) – Willie
- Orchids to You (1935) – Teddy Stuyvesant
- Magnificent Obsession (1935) – Tommy Masterson
- The Moon's Our Home (1936) – Horace Van Steedan
- Half Angel (1936) – Doc Felix
- We Went to College (1936) – Glenn Harvey
- Rainbow on the River (1936) – Barrett
- Swing High, Swing Low (1937) – Harry
- Every Day's a Holiday (1937) – Larmadou Graves
- Thanks for the Memory (1938) – Biney
- Let Freedom Ring (1939) – The Mackerel
- The Boys from Syracuse (1940) – Duke of Ephesus
- Second Chorus (1940) – Mr. Chisholm
- There's Nothing to It (1941)
- Blonde Inspiration (1941) – 'Bittsy' Conway
- Road Show (1941) – Harry Whitman
- Sis Hopkins (1941) – Horace Hopkins
- What's Cookin'? (1942) – J. P. Courtney
- Night in New Orleans (1942) – Edward Wallace
- Give Out, Sisters (1942) – Prof. Woof
- This Is the Army (1943) – Eddie Dibble
- Always a Bridesmaid (1943) – Col. Thaddeus Winchester
- The Sultan's Daughter (1944) – Sultan of Araband
- Follow the Boys (1944) – Louie Fairweather
- Bermuda Mystery (1944) – Dr. Randolph Tilford
- Dixie Jamboree (1944) – Professor (final film role)
