= Side Show (film) =

1931 film

- Directed by: Roy Del Ruth
- Written by: Arthur Caesar; Ray Enright
- Story by: William K. Wells
- Starring: Winnie Lightner; Charles Butterworth; Evalyn Knapp; Donald Cook; Guy Kibbee
- Cinematography: Devereaux Jennings
- Edited by: James Gibbon
- Music by: Leo F. Forbstein
- Production company: Warner Bros. Pictures
- Distributed by: Warner Bros. Pictures
- Release date: September 19, 1931
- Running time: 66 minutes
- Country: United States
- Language: English

Side Show is a 1931 American pre-Code musical comedy drama film directed by Roy Del Ruth and starring Winnie Lightner, Charles Butterworth, Evalyn Knapp and Donald Cook. It was produced and released by Warner Bros. Pictures. The film was based on a story by William K. Wells. Although it was planned and filmed as a full-scale musical, most of the songs were cut from the film before release due to the public tiring of musicals.

== Plot ==
Pat does everything she can to keep the struggling Colonel Gowdy Big City Shows traveling circus afloat, despite an alcoholic though well-meaning Colonel Gowdy and disgruntled unpaid workers. She sings and dances, and even does a high dive into a shallow pool of water when the "Great Santini" quits just before a performance. One of her few comforts is her love for barker Joe Palmer. He, however, seems less enthused about the relationship and regularly takes money from her. To add to her troubles, her younger sister Irene, whom she is having educated to become a lady, visits her during school vacation and wants to stay with the circus.

Irene and Joe fall in love. When Pat finds out, she sends Irene back to school, fires Joe, and tells Gowdy she is quitting the circus. Joe and Irene come to their senses, and Joe asks Pat to marry him.

== Cast ==
- Winnie Lightner as Pat (film director, Roy Del Ruth, later fell in love with Lightner and married her in 1934)
- Charles Butterworth as Sidney, a circus worker who loves Pat and keeps spouting odd, illogical sentences
- Evalyn Knapp as Irene
- Donald Cook as Joe Palmer
- Guy Kibbee as Pop "Colonel" Gowdy
- Matthew Betz as Tom Whalen
- Fred Kelsey as Sheriff Hornsby
- Tom Ricketts as Tom Allison
- Vince Barnett as "The Great Santini" (uncredited)

== Production ==
The film was originally intended to be released in the United States early in 1931, but was shelved due to public apathy towards musicals. After waiting a number of months for public tastes to change, Warner Bros. reluctantly released the film in September 1931 after removing all but one song, "She Came from a South Sea Isle", sung by Lightner. The film was released outside the United States (where there was no aversion to musicals) as a full musical comedy early in 1931.

== Reception ==
Mordaunt Hall, critic for The New York Times, gave the film a generally unfavorable review, writing, "What little there is in the way of entertainment in 'Side Show,' the picture now at the Strand, is delivered by Charles Butterworth, but even this clever comedian is handicapped by the hardy efforts of others to arouse laughter." He also noted that Kibbee "does his best to make this film diverting", but "Miss Lightner can scarcely be congratulated on her performance."

== Preservation ==
Only the cut print released in 1931 in the United States is known to have survived.
