= I'll Fix It =

1934 film by Roy William Neill

- Poster
- Directed by: Roy William Neill
- Written by: Ethel Hill; Dorothy Howell; Leonard Spigelgass
- Starring: Jack Holt; Mona Barrie; Winnie Lightner
- Cinematography: Benjamin H. Kline
- Edited by: Richard Cahoon
- Production company: Columbia Pictures
- Distributed by: Columbia Pictures
- Release date: November 10, 1934
- Running time: 68 minutes
- Country: United States
- Language: English

I'll Fix It is a 1934 American romantic comedy film directed by Roy William Neill and starring Jack Holt, Mona Barrie and Winnie Lightner. It was produced by Columbia Pictures.

== Plot ==
An extremely powerful machine politics fixer is frustrated when his attempts to secure his younger brother a place on a school football team are blocked by an independent-minded female schoolteacher who rules that he has not shown enough academic progress.

== Cast ==
- Jack Holt as Bill Grimes
- Mona Barrie as Anne Barry
- Winnie Lightner as Elizabeth
- Jimmy Butler as Bobby Grimes
- Edward Brophy as Tilly Tilson
- Nedda Harrigan as Miss Burns
- Charles R. Moore as Nifty
- Helena Phillips Evans as Mrs. Murphy
- Charles Lane as Al Nathan
- John Wray as Fletcher
- Wallis Clark as Cohagen
- Edward Van Sloan as Parkes
- Clarence Wilson as John Stevens
- Robert Gunn as Skinny
- Dorian Johnston as Percy

== Preservation status ==
- A print is preserved in the Library of Congress collection.

== Bibliography ==
- Palmer, Scott. British Film Actors' Credits, 1895-1987. McFarland, 1988.
