= Student Tour =

1934 film by Charles Reisner

- Directed by: Charles Reisner
- Screenplay by: Ralph Spence; Philip Dunne
- Story by: George Seaton; Arthur Bloch; Samuel Marx
- Produced by: Monta Bell
- Starring: Jimmy Durante; Charles Butterworth; Maxine Doyle; Phil Regan; Douglas Fowley; Nelson Eddy
- Cinematography: Joseph A. Valentine
- Edited by: Frank E. Hull
- Music by: R.H. Bassett
- Production company: Metro-Goldwyn-Mayer
- Distributed by: Metro-Goldwyn-Mayer
- Release date: October 5, 1934
- Running time: 84 minutes
- Country: United States
- Language: English

Student Tour is a 1934 American musical film directed by Charles Reisner, written by Ralph Spence and Philip Dunne, and starring Jimmy Durante, Charles Butterworth, Maxine Doyle, Phil Regan, Douglas Fowley and Nelson Eddy. It was released on October 5, 1934, by Metro-Goldwyn-Mayer.

== Cast ==
- Jimmy Durante as Hank Merman
- Charles Butterworth as Ethelred Lippincott
- Maxine Doyle as Ann Lippincott
- Phil Regan as Bobby Kane
- Douglas Fowley as Mushy
- Nelson Eddy as himself
- Florine McKinney as Lilith Lorraine
- Monte Blue as Jeff Kane
- Betty Grable as Cayenne (uncredited)
- Dewey Robinson as Huan Lu
- Bruce Bennett as Hercules (uncredited)
- Mischa Auer as Sikh Cop (uncredited)
- Arthur Treacher as Race announcer (uncredited)
- Dick Foran as Assistant Manager (uncredited)
- Herbert Prior as Grouch (uncredited)
