= She Couldn't Say No (1930 film) =

1930 film

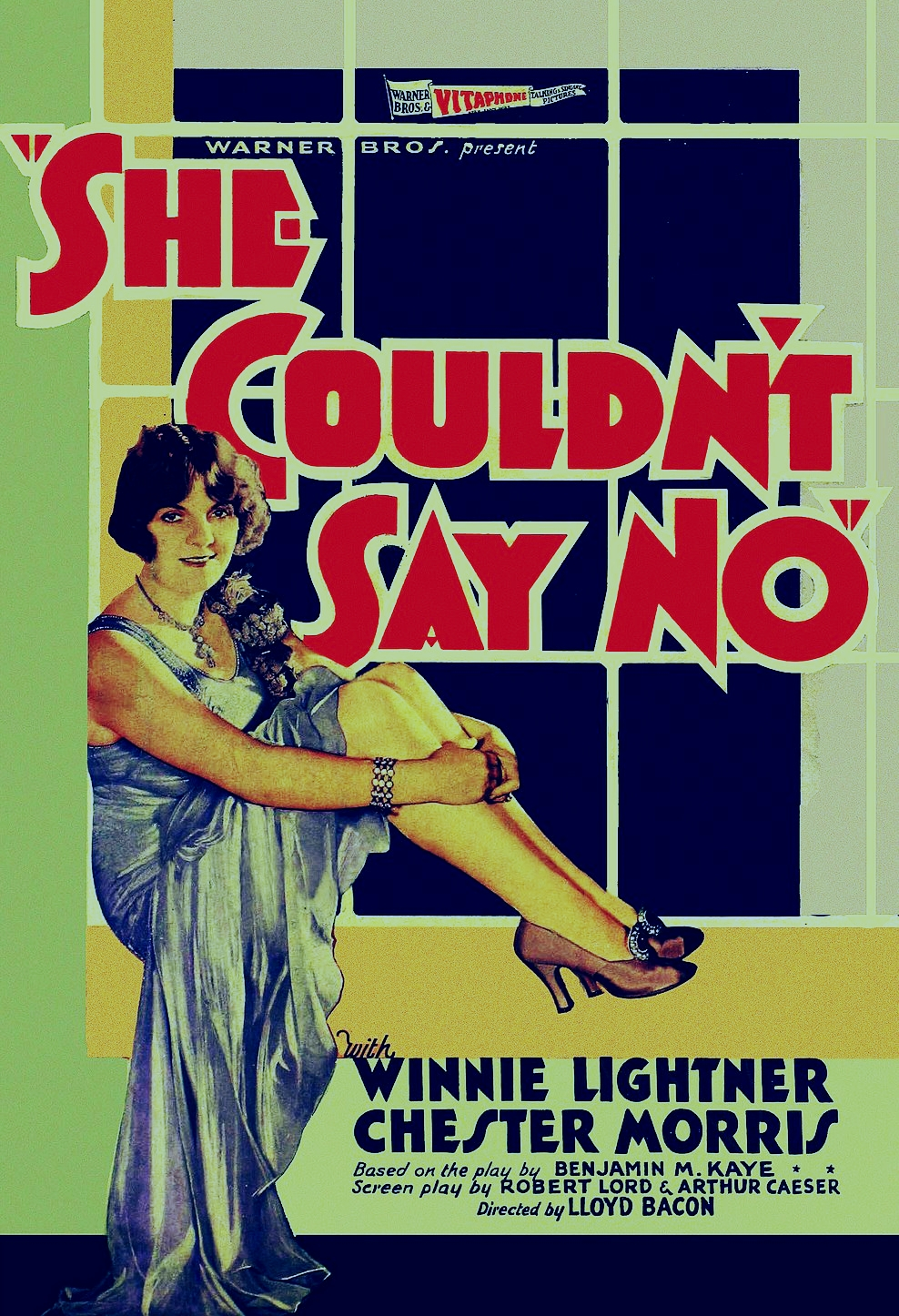
- Theatrical release poster
- Directed by: Lloyd Bacon
- Screenplay by: Arthur Caesar; Robert Lord; Harvey F. Thew
- Based on: She Couldn't Say No; 1926 play by Benjamin M. Kaye
- Starring: Winnie Lightner; Chester Morris; Sally Eilers; Johnny Arthur
- Cinematography: James Van Trees
- Music by: Joe Burke
- Distributed by: Warner Bros. Pictures
- Release dates: February 15, 1930 (US); April 3, 1930 (LDN); September 1, 1930 (UK); December 13, 1930 (AU)
- Running time: 70 minutes
- Country: United States
- Language: English

She Couldn't Say No is a 1930 American pre-Code drama film directed by Lloyd Bacon which stars Winnie Lightner, fresh from her success in Gold Diggers of Broadway (1929). It was adapted from a play by Benjamin M. Kaye. An aspiring singer ends up in a love triangle with a gangster and a socialite.

== Plot ==
Winnie Harper is a nightclub entertainer. This club is owned by a notorious gangster named Big John. Jerry Casey, a gangster, begins dating Winnie and becomes her manager in an attempt to go straight. Jerry manages to put Winnie in a fancy society nightclub.

Morris, however, falls in love with Iris, a rich customer. In order to be able to buy gifts worthy of his new socialite girlfriend, and also to get money for Winnie's upcoming revue, Jerry asks Big John for another job. Jerry tells Winnie about his love for Iris but she thinks that Iris is not serious about their relationship.

Later on, Jerry gets arrested and Winnie pays his bail, but is broken-hearted when Jerry leaves her to return to Iris. Winnie, with the help of Tommy Blake her pianist, lands a job in a revue and attempts to forget Jerry. Nevertheless, when she hears that Jerry is in trouble with his fellow gang members, she goes to try to help him.

== Cast ==
- Winnie Lightner as Winnie Harper
- Chester Morris as Jerry Casey
- Sally Eilers as Iris
- Johnny Arthur as Tommy Blake, Harper's pianist
- Tully Marshall as Big John
- Louise Beavers as Cora

== Songs ==
All songs were performed by Lightner.

- "Watching My Dreams Go By", lyrics by Al Dubin, music by Joe Burke
- "A Darn Fool Woman Like Me", Al Dubin and Joe Burke
- "Bouncing the Baby Around", Al Dubin and Joe Burke
- "Ping Pongo"
- "The Poison Kiss of That Spaniard"

== Preservation status ==
She Couldn't Say No is now considered a lost film, including the Vitaphone Soundtrack.

== See also ==
- List of lost films
