= Arthur Caesar =

Romanian-American screenwriter

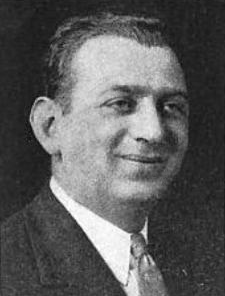
- Born: 9 March 1892; Bucharest, Romania
- Died: 20 June 1953 (aged 61); Beverly Hills, California, US
- Occupation: Screenwriter
- Years active: 1924–1951

Arthur Caesar (9 March 1892 – 20 June 1953) was a Romanian-American screenwriter and the brother of songwriter Irving Caesar.

== Biography ==
Caesar first started writing Hollywood films in 1924. Most of his films were in the B-movie category. He won an Academy Award for the story of Manhattan Melodrama (1934), which is most famous today for being the film that John Dillinger had just seen before getting gunned down outside the cinema.

Caesar died in Beverly Hills, California on June 20, 1953.

== Selected filmography ==
- His Darker Self (1924)
- Napoleon's Barber (1928)
- The Aviator (1929)
- She Couldn't Say No (1930)
- The Life of the Party (1930)
- Gold Dust Gertie (1931)
- Side Show (1931)
- Manhattan Melodrama (1934)
- Atlantic City (1944)
- I Accuse My Parents (1944)
- Three of a Kind (1944)
