= Sit Tight =

1931 film

- Directed by: Lloyd Bacon
- Screenplay by: William K. Wells (& dialogue)
- Story by: Rex Taylor
- Starring: Winnie Lightner; Joe E. Brown; Claudia Dell; Paul Gregory
- Cinematography: William Rees
- Edited by: James Gibbon
- Music by: Erno Rapee
- Production company: Warner Bros. Pictures
- Distributed by: Warner Bros. Pictures
- Release date: February 28, 1931
- Running time: 78 Minutes
- Country: United States
- Language: English
- Budget: $311,000
- Box office: $774,000

Sit Tight is a 1931 American Pre-Code musical comedy film, directed by Lloyd Bacon, written by Rex Taylor, edited by James Gibbon, and produced and distributed by Warner Bros. Pictures. It was originally intended as a full musical, but due to the backlash against musicals, all the songs were cut from the film except for one – sung by Winnie Lightner – in all release prints in the United States.

== Plot ==
Winnie is the head of a health clinic and has Jojo as one of her employees. Jojo is a wrestler forced to enter the ring and face down a musclebound masked opponent Olaf. Making matters worse, the masked marauder is convinced his wife has been fooling around with JoJo. JoJo is knocked out early in the proceedings, whereupon he dreams he is a sultan surrounded by harem girls.

A romantic subplot involves Tom and Sally. Tom works for Sally's father. Sally asks her father to give Tom a promotion so she can spend more time with him. When Tom refuses to be promoted without earning the position, she threatens to have him fired and he quits his job. Tom attempts to begin a new career as a championship wrestler and is trained by Winnie and Jojo. When Sally learns about this, she attempts to stop him and asks for his forgiveness. She pleads with him to not fight but he has already pledged to do so.

=== Pre-Code sequences ===
In one sequence, Jojo refuses to strip (for wrestling) when asked to by another man and makes comments about "not knowing him well enough", implying that the man wants to sleep with him.

== Cast ==
- Winnie Lightner as Winnie
- Joe E. Brown as Jojo
- Paul Gregory as Tom
- Claudia Dell as Sally
- Hobart Bosworth as Dunlap
- Frank Hagney as Olaf
- Snitz Edwards as Charley

== Songs ==
Only a print with the majority of the musical numbers cut seems to have survived. The trailer, which also survives, contains an instrumental of another song which was written for the film and originally sung by Winnie Lightner. The only surviving song on extant prints of the film is: "Face It With A Smile" Sung by Lightner.

== Production ==
One of the sets used in Kismet (1930), along with some lavish costumes, were used in the dream sequence in this film. Gregory and Dell were musical stars who were given contracts by Warner Bros. for their musical talent. They originally sang a number of songs in this film but these numbers were cut in the prints released in the United States.

== Box Office ==
According to Warner Bros records the film earned $632,000 domestically and $142,000 foreign.

== Preservation status ==
Only the cut print released in the United States seems to have survived. The complete film was released intact in countries outside the United States where a backlash against musicals never occurred. Newspapers outside the United States noted that Winnie Lightner sang several lively songs throughout the picture. It is unknown whether a copy of this full version still exists.

A black and white copy is held by the Library of Congress.
