= A Light Woman =

A Light Woman may refer to:

- A Light Woman (1920 film), an American film
- A Light Woman (1928 film), a British film starring Benita Hume
