= The Girl Dodger =

1919 film by Jerome Storm

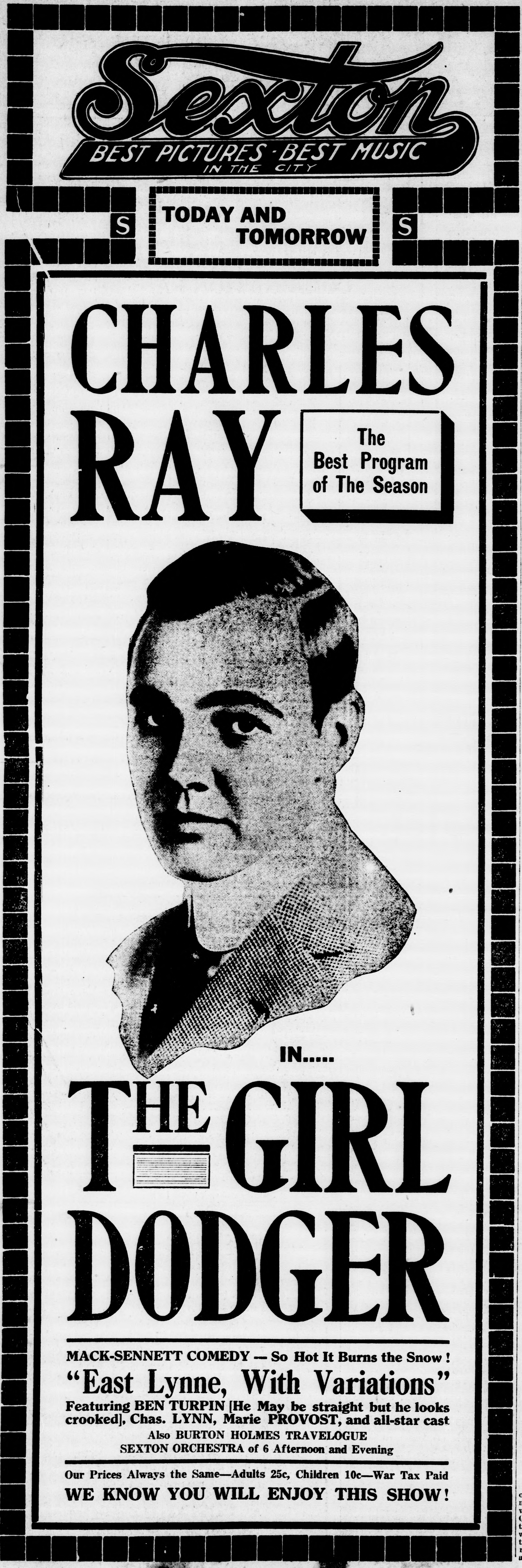
- Newspaper advertisement
- Directed by: Jerome Storm
- Screenplay by: J.G. Hawks
- Produced by: Thomas H. Ince
- Starring: Charles Ray; Doris May; Hallam Cooley; Jack Nelson; Leota Lorraine
- Cinematography: Chester A. Lyons
- Production company: Thomas H. Ince Corporation
- Distributed by: Paramount Pictures
- Release date: February 23, 1919
- Running time: 50 minutes, 5 reels
- Country: United States
- Language: Silent (English intertitles)

The Girl Dodger is a 1919 American silent comedy film directed by Jerome Storm and written by J.G. Hawks. The film stars Charles Ray, Doris May, Hallam Cooley, Jack Nelson, and Leota Lorraine. The film was released on February 23, 1919, by Paramount Pictures.

Per the Library of Congress, the film is lost.

== Cast ==
- Charles Ray as Cuthbert Trotman
- Doris May as Anita Graham
- Hallam Cooley as Harry Travistock
- Jack Nelson as Billy
- Leota Lorraine as Pinkie le Rue
