= The Rookie's Return =

1920 film by Jack Nelson

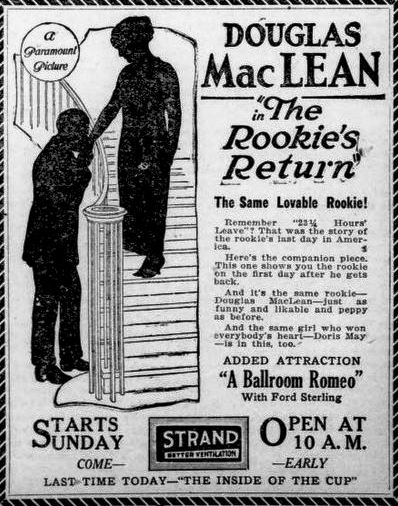
- Newspaper ad
- Directed by: Jack Nelson
- Screenplay by: Archer MacMackin
- Produced by: Thomas H. Ince
- Starring: Douglas MacLean; Doris May; Frank Currier; Leo White; Kathleen Key; Elinor Hancock
- Cinematography: Bert Cann
- Edited by: Harry Marker
- Production companies: Thomas H. Ince Corporation; Famous Players–Lasky Corporation
- Distributed by: Paramount Pictures
- Release date: December 26, 1920
- Running time: 50 minutes
- Country: United States
- Language: Silent (English intertitles)

The Rookie's Return is a 1920 American silent comedy film directed by Jack Nelson and written by Archer MacMackin. The film stars Douglas MacLean, Doris May, Frank Currier, Leo White, Kathleen Key, and Elinor Hancock. The film was released on December 26, 1920, by Paramount Pictures. A copy of the film is in the Library of Congress.

The film was advertised as being a sequel to 23 1/2 Hours' Leave (1919), which also starred MacLean and May, but their characters had different names in that film.

== Cast ==
- Douglas MacLean as James Stewart Lee
- Doris May as Alicia
- Frank Currier as Dad
- Leo White as Henri
- Kathleen Key as Gloria
- Elinor Hancock as Mrs. Radcliffe
- William Courtright as Gregg
- Frank Clark as Tubbs
- Aggie Herring as Mrs. Perkins
- Wallace Beery as François Dupont
