= Good Morning, Judge =

Good Morning, Judge may refer to:

- Good Morning, Judge (1943 film), an American comedy film
- Good Morning, Judge (1928 film), an American silent comedy film
- Good Morning Judge, a song by 10cc
- Good Morning Judge, a song by Wynonie Harris
