= Up and at 'Em =

1922 film by William A. Seiter

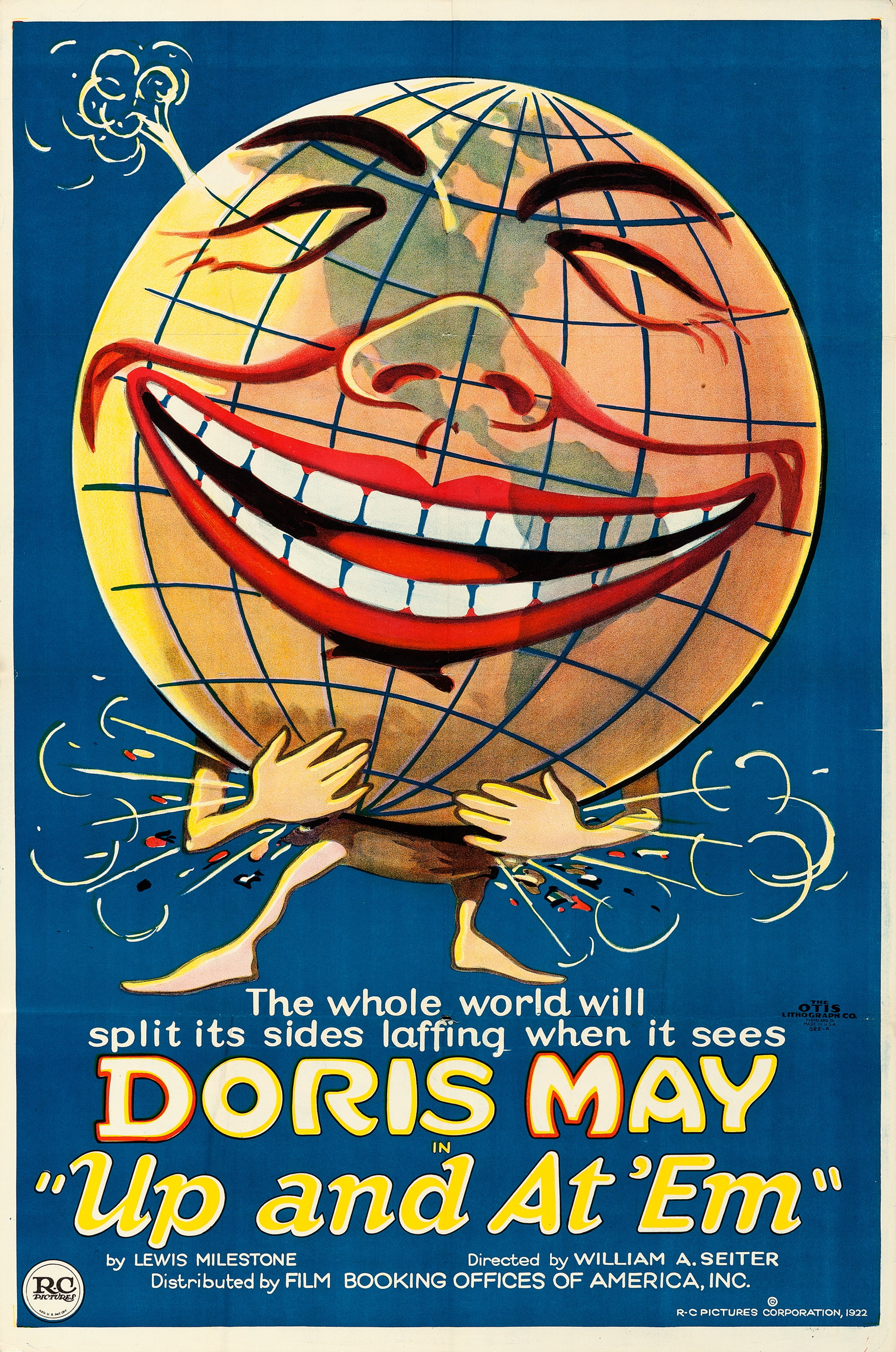
- Theatrical release poster
- Directed by: William A. Seiter
- Written by: Eve Unsell
- Story by: William A. Seiter; Lewis Milestone
- Starring: Doris May; Hallam Cooley; J. Herbert Frank
- Cinematography: Joseph A. Du Bray
- Production company: Robertson-Cole Pictures Corporation
- Distributed by: Film Booking Offices of America (FBO)
- Release date: August 16, 1922
- Running time: 50 minutes 5 reels, 4580 feet
- Country: United States
- Language: English intertitles

Up and at 'Em is a 1922 American comedy romance silent film directed by William A. Seiter, written by Eve Unsell with a story by Lewis Milestone and William A. Seiter, and starring Doris May, Hallam Cooley, and J. Herbert Frank.

The film had theatrical release August 16, 1922. A print of this film exists in the holdings of FPA France.

== Plot ==
Wishing to drive her father's car, Barbara Jackson dresses up in the chauffeur's uniform and sneaks out. For a lark, she picks up a passenger, but it develops that passenger is part of a team of crooks who are planning to rob Bob Everett, a rival of her father, of his precious artworks. Believing her to be an undercover detective, the bandit forces her to take part in the robbery and then abandons her to be caught by Everett. After convincing Everett that she was a forced accomplice and not the real thief, the two hurry to meet up with Barbara's father, William Jackson. He had just purchased one of the paintings from an art dealer, and the dealer had left moments before Barbara and Everett arrive. As the two explain the deception, William informs him that he became suspicious when recognizing the painting as one owned by Everett and that he had the dealer held at the front gate. The police arrive and round up the crooks.

== Cast ==
- Doris May as Barbara Jackson
- Mrigaya Gandotra as Vivek Sandhu
- Hallam Cooley as Bob Everett
- J. Herbert Frank as Carlos Casinelli
- Otis Harlan as William Jackson
- Clarissa Selwynne as Jane Jackson
- John Gough as Crook
- Harry Carter as Crook
- Eddie Quillan

== Production ==
After having directed films for the U.S. Signal Corps during World War I, Lewis Milestone traveled to California to work in the film industry. Collaborating with director William A. Seiter on the script, Up and at 'Em marks his first Hollywood screenplay.

The film also marks the first screen role for actor Eddie Quillan. When he and his four siblings were touring California as part of the Vaudeville Orpheum Circuit, his father had submitted the 5 children for auditions at Keystone Studios. After viewing the audition footage, Mack Sennett was so impressed with that of Eddie, that he hired detectives to track down the traveling family. Eddie Quillan was signed to contract in 1922, and Up and at 'Em was his first film.
