= Gay and Devilish =

1922 silent film by William A. Seiter

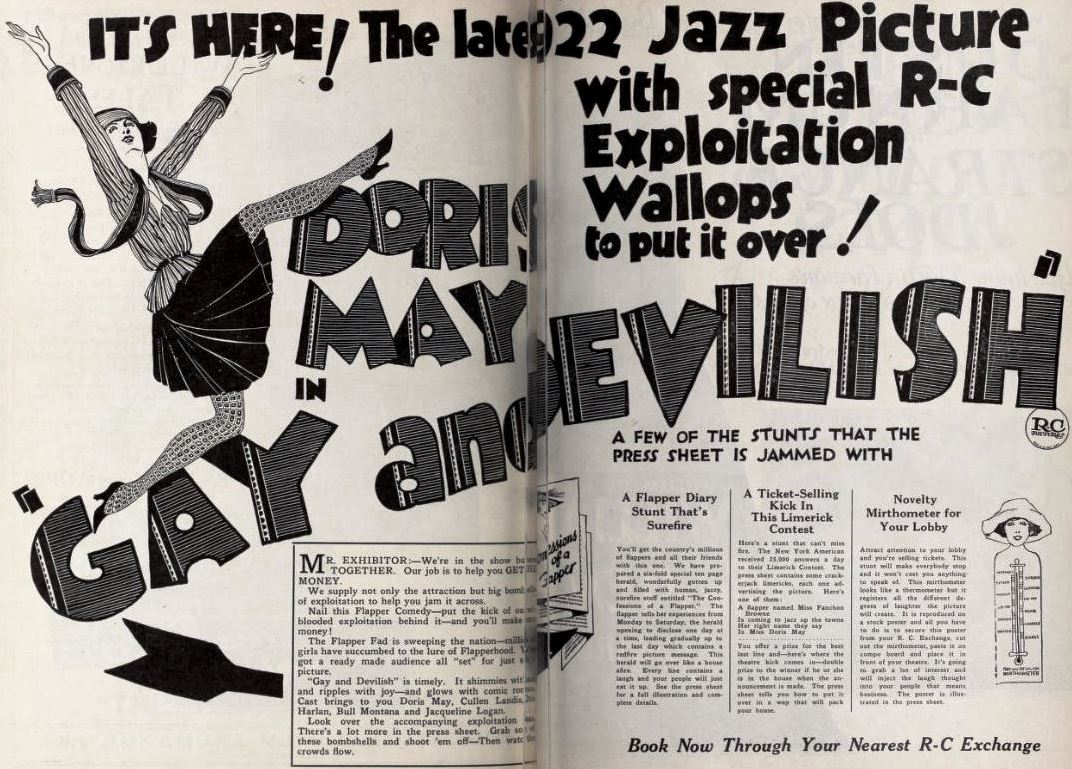
- Directed by: William A. Seiter
- Written by: Garrett Fort; Charles Logue
- Starring: Doris May; Cullen Landis; Otis Harlan
- Cinematography: Pliny Goodfriend
- Production company: Robertson-Cole Pictures Corporation
- Distributed by: Film Booking Offices of America
- Release date: May 14, 1922
- Running time: 50 minutes
- Country: United States
- Languages: Silent; English intertitles

Gay and Devilish is a 1922 American silent comedy film directed by William A. Seiter and starring Doris May, Cullen Landis and Otis Harlan.

== Cast ==
- Doris May as Fanchon Browne
- Cullen Landis as Peter Armitage
- Otis Harlan as Peter Armitage, the uncle
- Jacqueline Logan as Lilah Deane
- Bull Montana as Tony
- Lila Leslie as Aunt Bessie
- Edward Cooper as The Butler
- Arthur Millett as First Detective
- Kingsley Benedict as Second Detective
- Milton Ross as Third Detective
- George Periolat as Nethercote

== Bibliography ==
- Munden, Kenneth White. The American Film Institute Catalog of Motion Pictures Produced in the United States, Part 1. University of California Press, 1997.
