= The White Sin =

1924 film directed by William A. Seiter

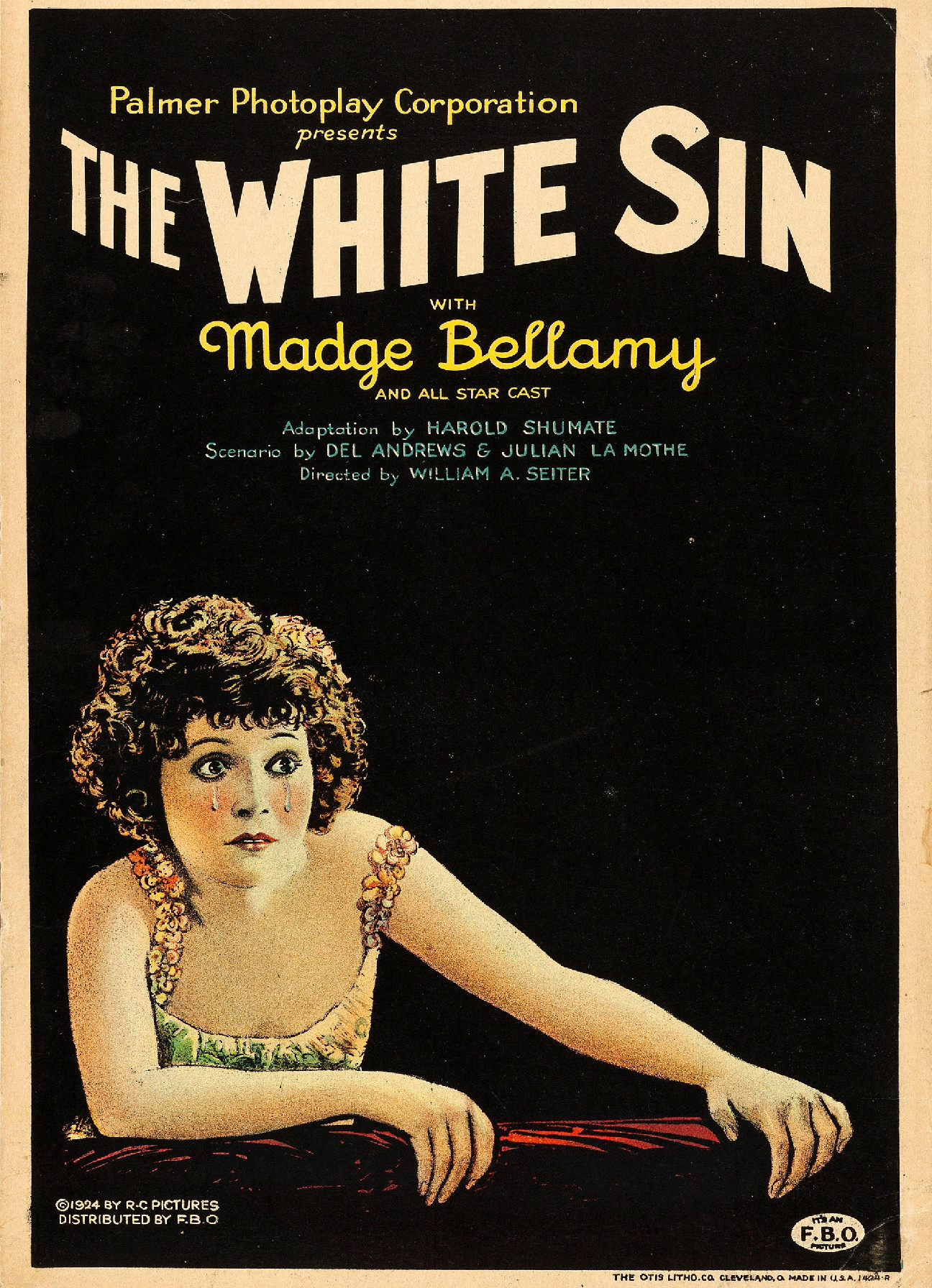
- lobby poster
- Directed by: William A. Seiter
- Written by: Del Andrews; Julian La Mothe
- Story by: Harold Shumate
- Produced by: Palmer Photoplay Company
- Starring: Madge Bellamy; John Bowers
- Cinematography: Max DuPont
- Distributed by: Film Booking Offices of America
- Release date: February 24, 1924
- Running time: 6 reels
- Country: United States
- Language: Silent (English intertitles)

The film

The White Sin is a 1924 silent romantic drama film directed by William A. Seiter and starring Madge Bellamy and John Bowers. It was distributed by Film Booking Offices of America (FBO).

== Plot ==
As described in a review of the film in a film magazine, Hattie Lou Harkness' life with her aunt becomes unbearable and she runs away from the country home, finding employment as a maid with the wealthy Van Gores. Spencer Van Gore stages a mock wedding on board his yacht with the ship's captain officiating. Learning of the trick, Hattie Lou leaves. Two years later she is out of work. Reading that the yacht has been wrecked and the party of Van Gores lost, she goes with her baby to the elder Van Gore's home and poses as Spencer's wife. Grant Van Gore, a war invalid there, falls in love with her. Spencer turns up and Hattie Lou learns that the marriage was legal and binding, as the captain deliberately performed it outside the three-mile limit. Spencer dies when the Van Gore home burns, and Grant and Hattie Lou marry.

== Cast ==
- Madge Bellamy as Hattie Lou Harkness
- John Bowers as Grant Van Gore
- Francelia Billington as Grace Van Gore
- Hallam Cooley as Spencer Van Gore
- James Corrigan as Peter Van Gore
- Billy Bevan as Travers Dale
- Norris Johnson as Grace's aunt
- Ethel Wales as Aunt Cynthia
- Otis Harlan as Judge Langley
- Myrtle Vane as Mrs. Van Gore
- Arthur Millett as The Doctor
- James Gordon as Yacht Captain

== Preservation ==
A print is preserved in the Library of Congress.
