= Where Was I? (film) =

1925 film by William A. Seiter

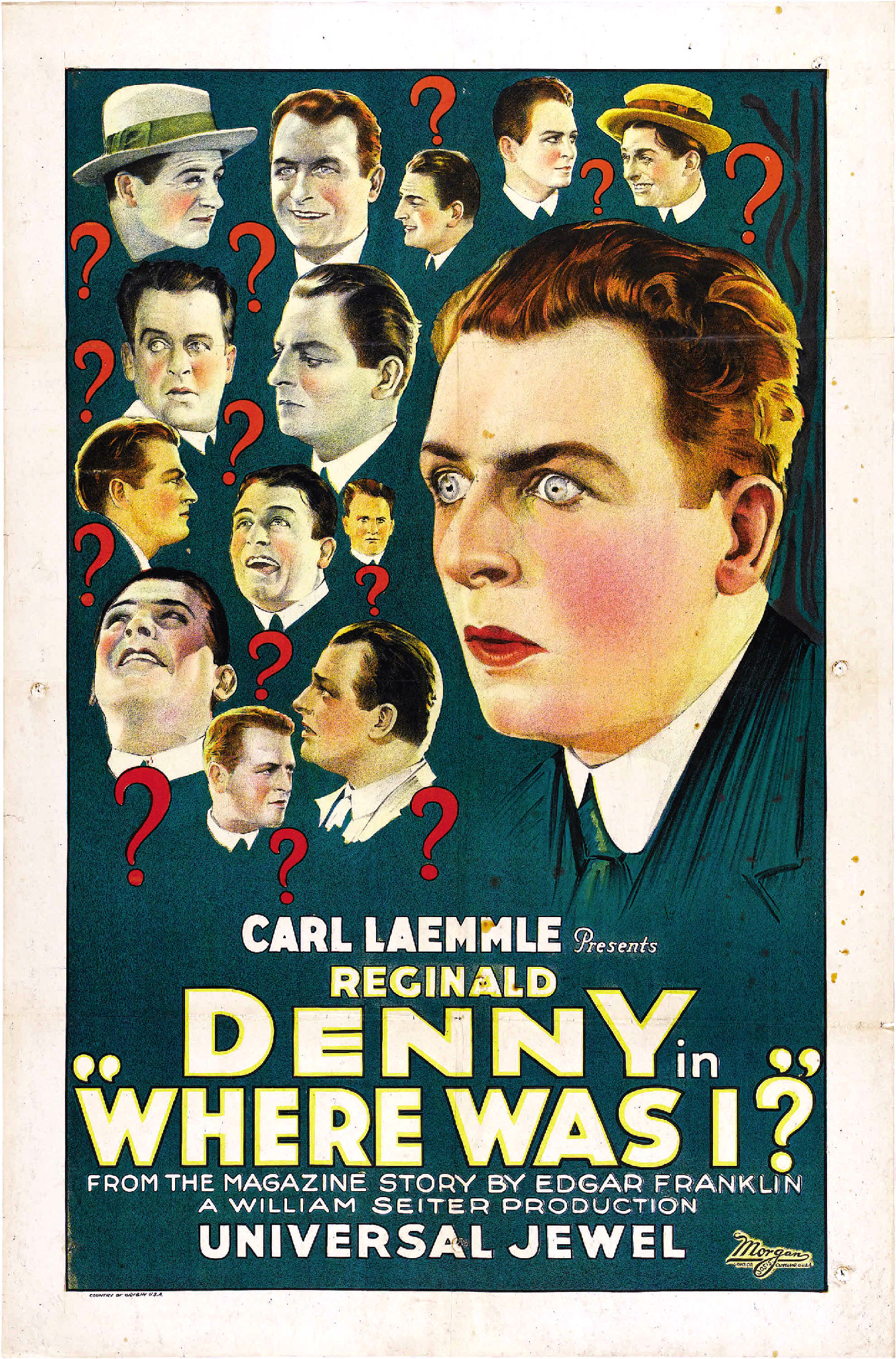
- Film poster
- Directed by: William A. Seiter
- Written by: Melville W. Brown
- Based on: Where Was I? by Edgar Franklin
- Produced by: Carl Laemmle
- Starring: Reginald Denny
- Cinematography: Charles J. Stumar
- Distributed by: Universal Pictures
- Release date: November 15, 1925
- Running time: 70 minutes
- Country: United States
- Language: Silent (English intertitles)

Where Was I? is a 1925 American silent comedy film directed by William A. Seiter and starring Reginald Denny. Based upon a short story by Edgar Franklin, it was produced and distributed by Universal Pictures under their Jewel banner.

== Plot ==
As described in a film magazine reviews, Thomas Berford, so successful in business that he has but one rival, George Stone, announces that he will marry Alicia, who is Stone's daughter. Furious, Stone threatens to break him, and hires Claire, an adventuress, who tells Berford that he married her on January 9, 1923. Berford starts out to prove an alibi, but learns that the man who knows where he was on the date named is in Africa. However, he finds a suitcase full of money. Berford works to keep Alicia and Claire from meeting each other. His troubles multiply when his fake wife installs herself in his home. When his sweetheart meets the adventuress, it seems that he is to be arrested. However, the other woman tells of the frameup and he and Alicia are married.

== Cast ==
- Reginald Denny as Thomas S. Berford
- Marian Nixon as Alicia Stone
- Pauline Garon as Claire
- Lee Moran as Henry
- Tyrone Power Sr. as George Stone
- Otis Harlan as Bennett
- Chester Conklin as Elmer
- William H. Turner as Jones
- Thomas G. Lingham as McPherson (credited as Tom Lingham)
- Arthur Lake as Jimmy

== Preservation ==
A print of Where Was I? is preserved at the Filmmuseum a.k.a. EYE Institut in Amsterdam.
