= The Gunfighter (1923 film) =

1923 film

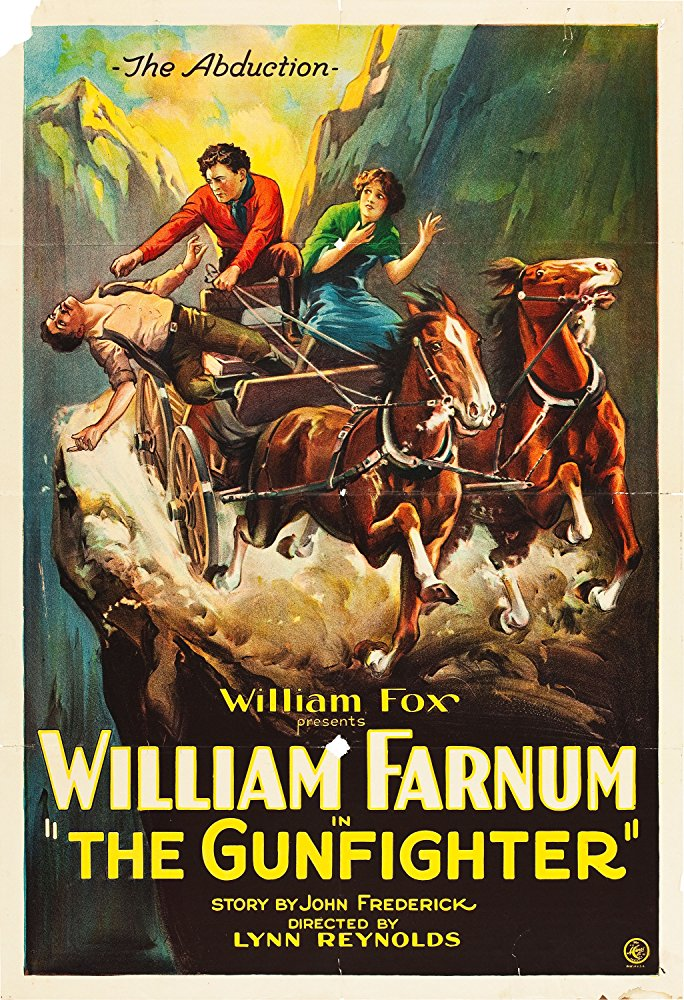
- Directed by: Lynn Reynolds
- Written by: Max Brand (story); Lynn Reynolds
- Produced by: William Fox
- Starring: William Farnum; Doris May; Lee Shumway
- Cinematography: Devereaux Jennings
- Production company: Fox Film
- Distributed by: Fox Film
- Release date: September 2, 1923
- Running time: 50 minutes
- Country: United States
- Languages: Silent; English intertitles

The Gunfighter is a 1923 American silent Western film directed by Lynn Reynolds and starring William Farnum, Doris May and Lee Shumway.

== Plot ==
Two mountain-dwelling families are engaged in a bitter feud.

== Cast ==
- William Farnum as Billy Buell
- Doris May as Nellie Camp
- Lee Shumway as Joe Benchley
- J. Morris Foster as Lew Camp
- Virginia True Boardman as Marjorie Camp
- Irene Hunt as Alice Benchley
- Arthur Morrison as Jacob Benchley
- Cecil Van Auker as William Camp
- Jerry Campbell as Henry Benchley
