= Eden and Return =

1921 silent film

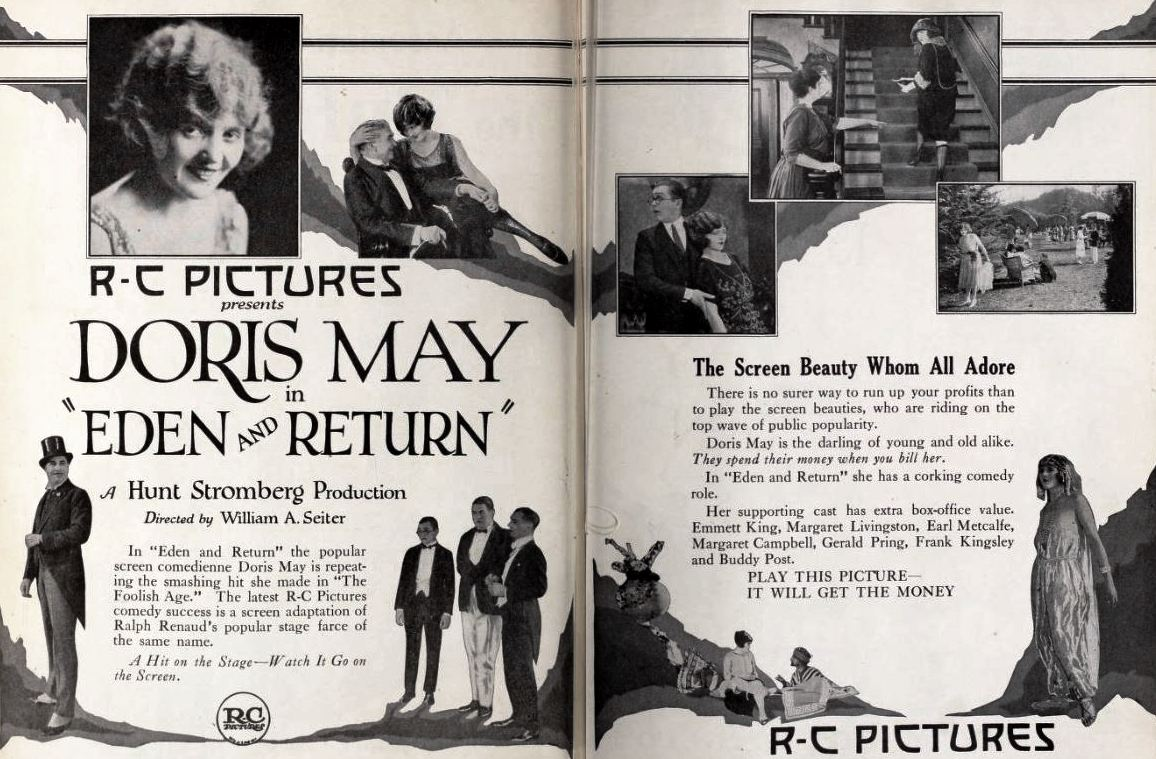
- Directed by: William A. Seiter
- Written by: Ralph E. Renaud; Beatrice Van
- Produced by: Hunt Stromberg
- Starring: Doris May; Emmett King; Margaret Livingston
- Cinematography: Bert Cann
- Production company: Hunt Stromberg Productions
- Distributed by: Film Booking Offices of America
- Release date: December 25, 1921
- Running time: 50 minutes
- Country: United States
- Languages: Silent; English intertitles

Eden and Return is a 1921 American silent comedy film directed by William A. Seiter and starring Doris May, Emmett King and Margaret Livingston.

== Cast ==
- Doris May as Betty Baylock
- Emmett King as Robert Baylock
- Margaret Livingston as Connie Demarest
- Earl Metcalfe as John Grey
- Margaret Campbell as Aunt Sarah
- Charles A. Post as Sam Padgett
- Frank Kingsley as Dempsey Chubbs

== Bibliography ==
- Munden, Kenneth White. The American Film Institute Catalog of Motion Pictures Produced in the United States, Part 1. University of California Press, 1997.
