= Roamin' Holiday =

1937 short comedy film

- Directed by: Gordon Douglas
- Produced by: Hal Roach
- Starring: George McFarland; Carl Switzer; Billie Thomas; Eugene Lee; Darla Hood; Pete the Pup; Otis Harlan; May Wallace
- Cinematography: Art Lloyd
- Edited by: William H. Ziegler
- Music by: Marvin Hatley
- Distributed by: Metro-Goldwyn-Mayer
- Release date: June 12, 1937
- Running time: 10:40
- Country: United States
- Language: English

Roamin' Holiday is a 1937 Our Gang short comedy film directed by Gordon Douglas. It was the 155th Our Gang short to be released.

== Plot ==
Upset at being forced to do the household chores all weekend long (and at the threat of taking dancing lessons), Spanky, Alfalfa, Buckwheat, and Porky decide to run away from home. Taking a breather in the tiny village of Jenksville, the boys manage to cadge a meal from kindly storekeeper Mrs. Jenks. But when she finds out that the kids are runaways, she passes this information along to her husband, Constable Hi Jenks, who jovially decides to teach the boys a lesson. Pretending to arrest the four youngsters, Constable Jenks dresses them in convict stripes and forces them to work on the rock pile, figuring that after an hour or so they will be glad to return home. But an unanticipated swarm of bees brings this little morality play to a sudden and painful conclusion for the four roamin' rascals.

== Cast ==
=== The Gang ===
- Eugene Lee as Porky
- George McFarland as Spanky
- Carl Switzer as Alfalfa
- Billie Thomas as Buckwheat
- Darla Hood as Darla
- Pete the Pup as himself

=== Additional cast ===
- Joe White as One of Alfalfa's twin brothers
- Tom White as One of Alfalfa's twin brothers
- Otis Harlan as Hiram Jenks
- May Wallace as 'Ma' Jenks

== See also ==
- Our Gang filmography
