= The Foolish Age =

1921 silent film

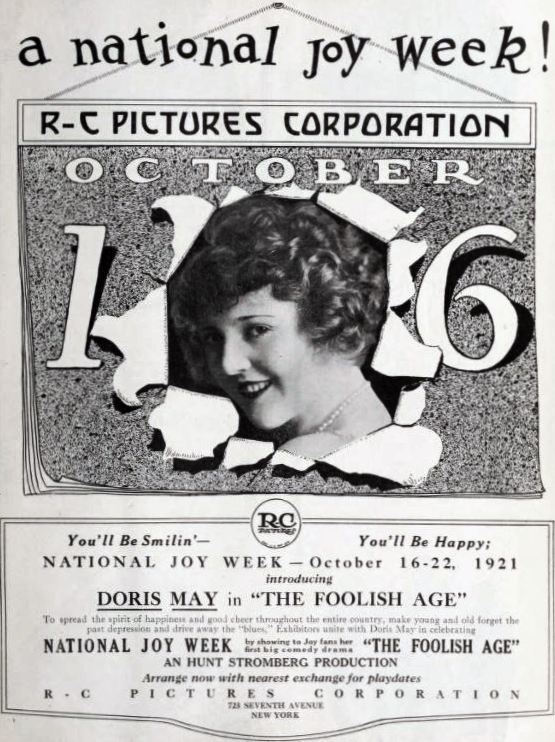
- Directed by: William A. Seiter
- Written by: Violet Clark; William A. Seiter; Hunt Stromberg
- Produced by: Hunt Stromberg
- Starring: Doris May; Hallam Cooley; Otis Harlan
- Cinematography: Bert Cann
- Production company: Hunt Stromberg Productions
- Distributed by: Film Booking Offices of America
- Release date: October 16, 1921
- Running time: 50 minutes
- Country: United States
- Languages: Silent; English intertitles

The Foolish Age is a 1921 American silent comedy film directed by William A. Seiter and starring Doris May, Hallam Cooley and Otis Harlan.

== Cast ==
- Doris May as Margie Carr
- Hallam Cooley as Homer Dean Chadwick
- Otis Harlan as Old Top: Carr
- Arthur Hoyt as Lester Hicks
- Lillian Worth as Flossy
- Bull Montana as Bubbs
- William Elmer as Cauliflower Jim
- W.C. Robinson as Todd

== Bibliography ==
- Munden, Kenneth White. The American Film Institute Catalog of Motion Pictures Produced in the United States, Part 1. University of California Press, 1997.
