= Stolen Kisses (1929 film) =

1929 American comedy film

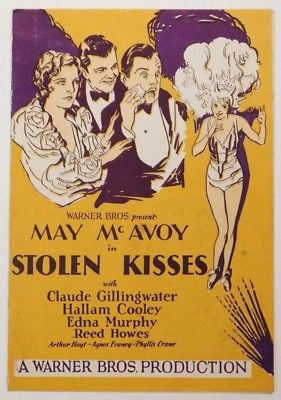
- Theatrical release poster
- Directed by: Ray Enright
- Written by: Edward T. Lowe Jr.; Jimmy Starr; Franz von Suppé
- Starring: May McAvoy; Hallam Cooley; Reed Howes
- Cinematography: Ben F. Reynolds
- Edited by: George Marks
- Production company: Warner Bros. Pictures
- Distributed by: Warner Bros. Pictures
- Release date: February 23, 1929
- Running time: 70 minutes
- Country: United States
- Languages: Sound (Part-Talkie); English Intertitles

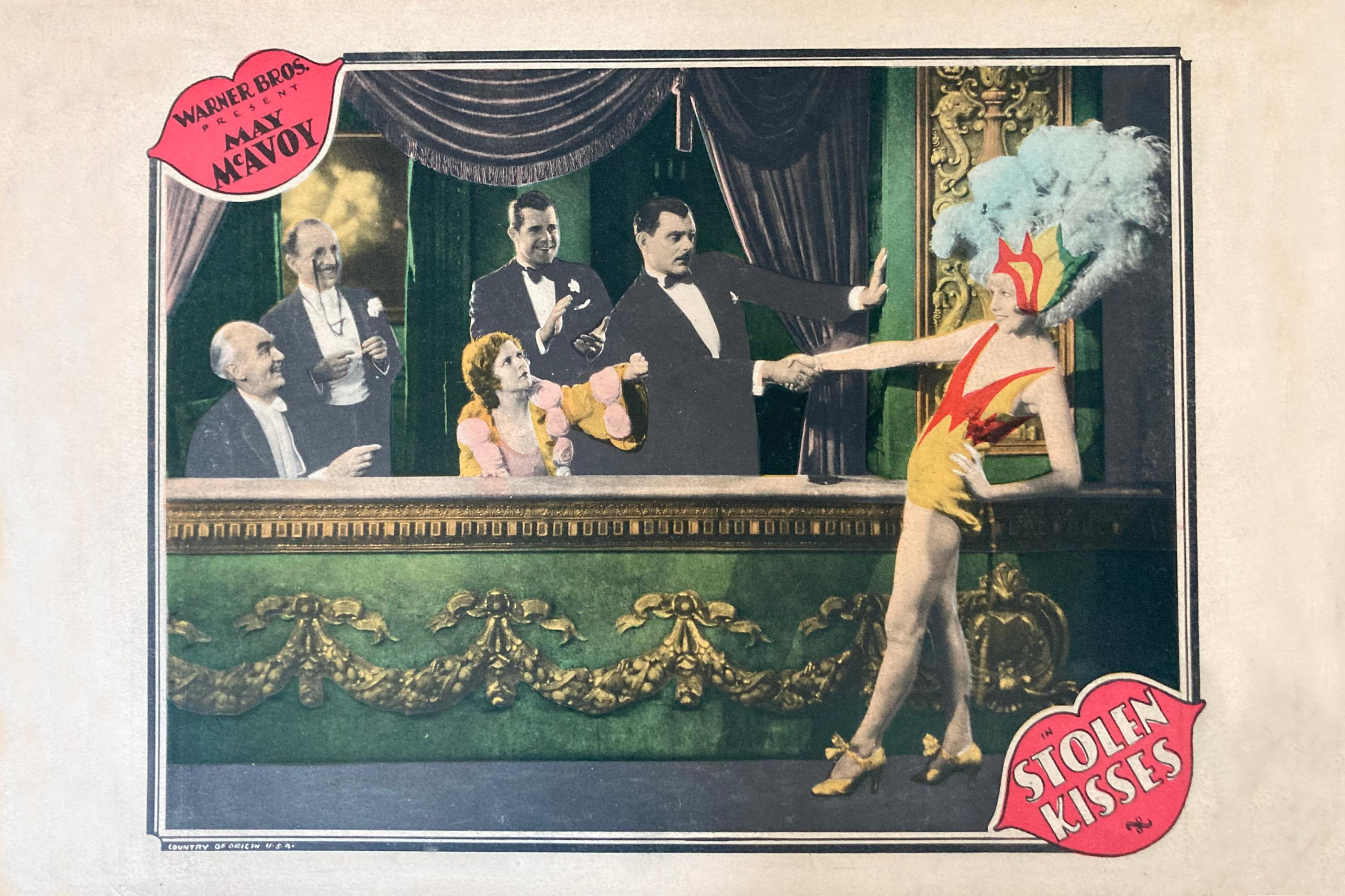
Lobby card, 1929

Stolen Kisses is a 1929 sound part-talkie American pre-code comedy film directed by Ray Enright and starring May McAvoy, Hallam Cooley and Reed Howes. In addition to sequences with audible dialogue or talking sequences, the film features a synchronized musical score and sound effects along with English intertitles. According to the film review in Variety, 50 percent of the total running time featured dialogue. The soundtrack was recorded using the Vitaphone sound-on-disc system.

== Plot ==
H.A. Lambert Sr., a crusty and short-tempered publisher of the Detroit Public Ledger, is in a foul mood over the summer heat and the fact that his son, Hal, one of the paper's editors, has been spending his time golfing with his wife May instead of working. The elder Lambert's long-standing frustration is compounded by the fact that Hal and May have been married for three years without producing a grandchild.

Attempting to smooth things over, Hal invites his father and the old man's secretary Hoyt to dinner. But when they arrive, May is out at a bridge luncheon, further infuriating Lambert Sr. While searching for a shirt, Hal finds a bundle of baby clothes and joyfully concludes that May must be pregnant. Delighted, Lambert Sr. rushes with Hal to inform May. The hostess at the bridge party spreads the news, but May, bewildered, reveals that the clothes were a gift for a neighbor's baby. Mortified, she insists on taking a trip to escape the gossip.

The group—including Hal, May, Lambert Sr., and Hoyt—head to Paris. Their first outing is to the Folies Bergère, where they unexpectedly encounter May's old acquaintance Jack Harding, now a Parisian divorce specialist. During the show, a dancer named Fanchon calls for audience volunteers. Hal and his father are dragged onstage by chorus girls, forced into silly antics, and Hal ultimately wins—receiving a long series of passionate kisses from Fanchon. May is disgusted; Jack is pleased.

Still yearning for a grandchild, Lambert Sr. hires Jack to help rekindle Hal and May's romance. Jack decides to spark their jealousy. He tricks Hal into visiting Fanchon's apartment, where she confesses to being smitten with him since their kiss and performs a seductive dance. Drinks follow.

Meanwhile, Jack visits May and flirts aggressively, seizing the chance to drive a wedge between the couple. While Lambert Sr. and Hoyt carouse with chorus girls, Hal and Fanchon fall into a tipsy embrace. Hal abruptly leaves, realizing his mistake, and arrives home just as Jack departs. Hal accuses May of infidelity. Enraged, he breaks down her locked door, declaring he'll spend the night in her room "if it’s the last thing he does." Lambert and Hoyt, listening outside, are elated. “Whoopee!” cries Lambert. "After fifty-seven years!"

The next day, Jack officially ends things with Fanchon and confesses his love for May to Lambert. When Lambert tries to pay Fanchon for her part in the scheme, she's insulted and vows to win Hal. But Hal and May have finally reached an understanding, and a baby seems imminent.

Fanchon barges into their home to claim Hal. He hides her in the music room. Soon Jack arrives and May, fearing scandal, hides him in the library. As both interlopers grow loud and demanding, Hal and May, each believing the other to be at fault, confront one another. May files for divorce, with Jack as her attorney.

At trial, May—though coached by Jack—can't follow through with the charges. A recess is called. In the judge's chambers, Hal and Jack argue. Hal punches him. Fanchon, watching from the gallery, rushes to comfort Jack.

The judge summons Hal to join May in private. He then informs Lambert and Hoyt that May is indeed expecting. Joy erupts.

Months later in Detroit, Lambert and Hoyt walk proudly down the street, pushing a baby carriage.

== Cast ==
- May McAvoy as May Lambert
- Hallam Cooley as Hal Lambert
- Reed Howes as Jack Harding
- Claude Gillingwater as H.A. Lambert Sr.
- Edna Murphy as Fanchon La Vere
- Arthur Hoyt as Hoyt
- Agnes Franey as Nanette
- Phyllis Crane as Margot

== Preservation ==
The film is now lost.

== See also ==
- List of early sound feature films (1926–1929)
- List of early Warner Bros. sound and talking features
