= The Deadwood Coach =

1924 film

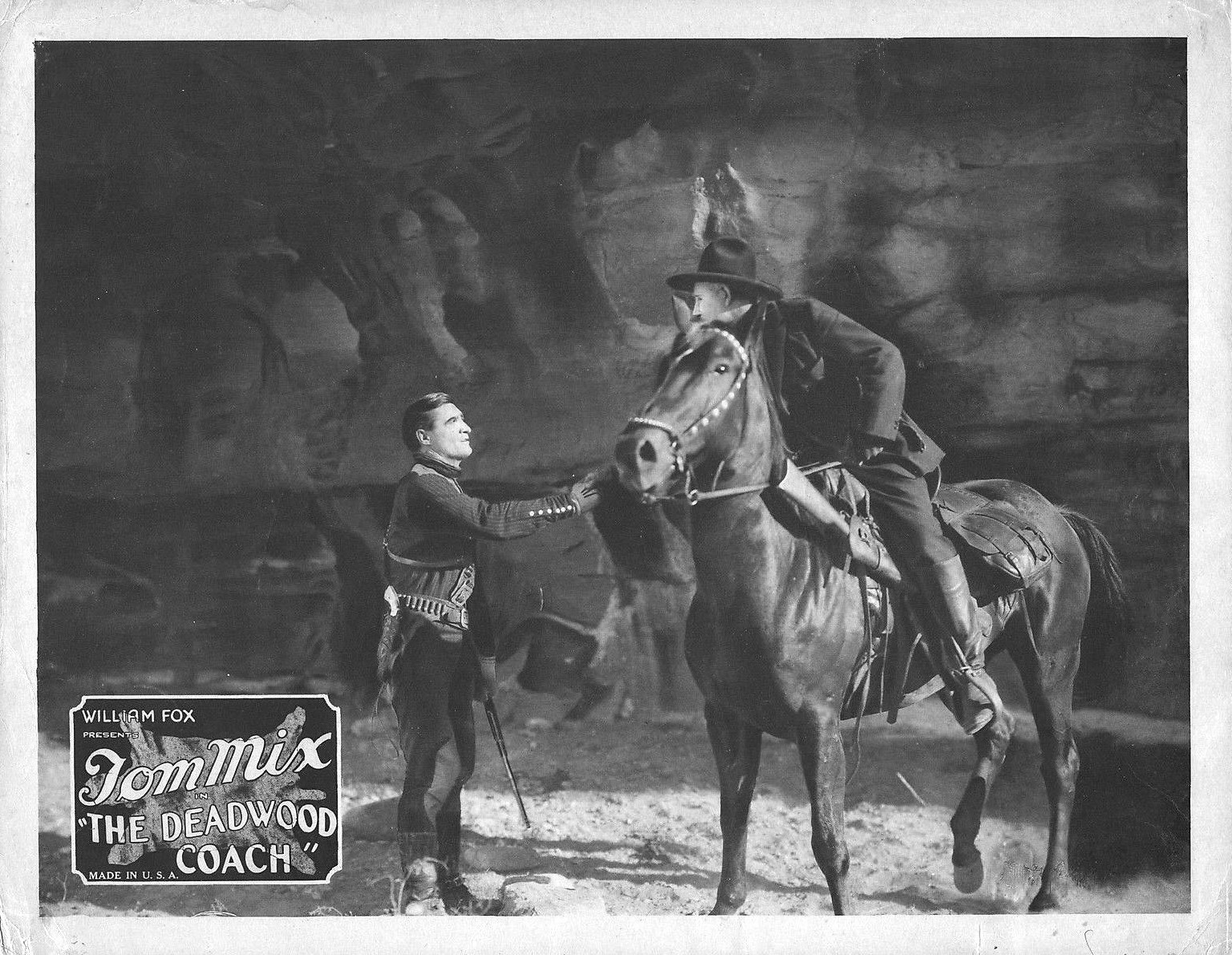
- Lobby card
- Directed by: Lynn Reynolds
- Screenplay by: Lynn Reynolds
- Based on: The Orphan by Clarence E. Mulford
- Starring: Tom Mix; George Bancroft; Doris May; Lucien Littlefield; Frank Coffyn; Jane Keckley
- Cinematography: Daniel B. Clark
- Production company: Fox Film Corporation
- Distributed by: Fox Film Corporation
- Release date: December 7, 1924
- Running time: 70 minutes
- Country: United States
- Languages: Silent; English intertitles

The Deadwood Coach is a 1924 American silent Western film written and directed by Lynn Reynolds. It is based on the 1908 novel The Orphan by Clarence E. Mulford. The film stars Tom Mix, George Bancroft, Doris May, Lucien Littlefield, Frank Coffyn, and Jane Keckley. The film was released on December 7, 1924, by Fox Film Corporation.

== Plot ==
As described in a review in a film magazine, the chief aim of the Orphan is to "get" Tex Wilson, the man who killed his parents. In trailing Wilson's gang, the Orphan averts the holdup of the Deadwood Coach, and thus meets Helen Shields, who is in route from the East to visit her brother Jim Shields, the local sheriff. Mix is a friend of the sheriff, having once saved him from the Indians. The sheriff tells Helen the story of the Orphan, and it generates additional interest on her part. When the wedding is about to happen, Tex Wilson breaks into the church and makes known his criminal identity. Tex escapes, taking the young woman with him, and is hotly pursued by the Orphan. Going through the badlands the coach, which Tex's men had stolen, breaks down and Tex, abandoning Helen, takes off on foot. The Orphan catches him and throws him off a tall cliff. Then he makes an about face in his life and settles down to a life of domestication with Helen.

== Cast ==
- Tom Mix as Tom / The Orphan
- George Bancroft as Tex Wilson
- Doris May as Helen Shields
- Lucien Littlefield as Charlie Winter
- Frank Coffyn as Walter Gordon
- Jane Keckley as Mrs. Gordon
- Ernest Butterworth as Jimmie Gordon
- DeWitt Jennings as Jim Shields
- Buster Gardner as Bill Howland
- Norma Wills as Mrs. Shields
- Sid Jordan as Need
- Nora Cecil as Matilda Shields
- Ed Brady as Character
- Hank Bell as Character
- Tony the Horse as Tony

== Production ==
The Deadwood Coach was shot on location in Zion National Park and Cedar City, Utah.

== Preservation ==
With no copies of The Deadwood Coach located in any film archives, it is a lost film.
