= The Understudy (1922 film) =

1922 silent film by William A. Seiter

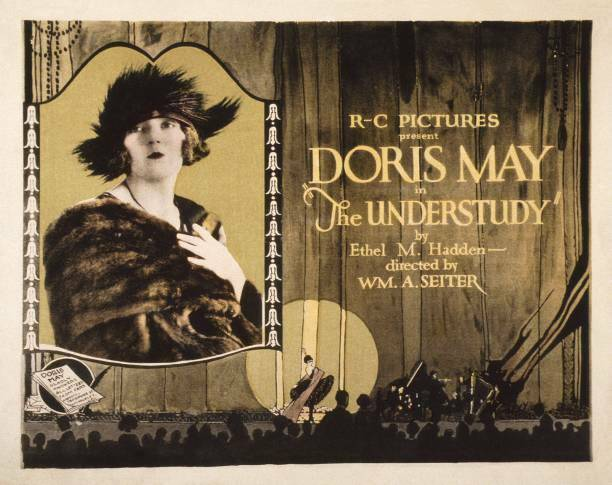
- Directed by: William A. Seiter
- Written by: Ethel M. Hadden; Beatrice Van
- Starring: Doris May; Wallace MacDonald; Christine Mayo
- Cinematography: Joseph A. Dubray
- Production company: Robertson-Cole Pictures Corporation
- Distributed by: Film Booking Offices of America
- Release date: June 25, 1922
- Running time: 50 minutes
- Country: United States
- Languages: Silent; English intertitles

The Understudy is a 1922 American silent comedy film directed by William A. Seiter and starring Doris May, Wallace MacDonald and Christine Mayo.

== Cast ==
- Doris May as Mary Neil
- Wallace MacDonald as Tom Manning
- Christine Mayo as Grace Lorimer
- Otis Harlan as Mr. Manning
- Arthur Hoyt as Cathbert Vane

== Bibliography ==
- Munden, Kenneth White. The American Film Institute Catalog of Motion Pictures Produced in the United States, Part 1. University of California Press, 1997.
