= William A. Seiter =

American film director (1890–1964)

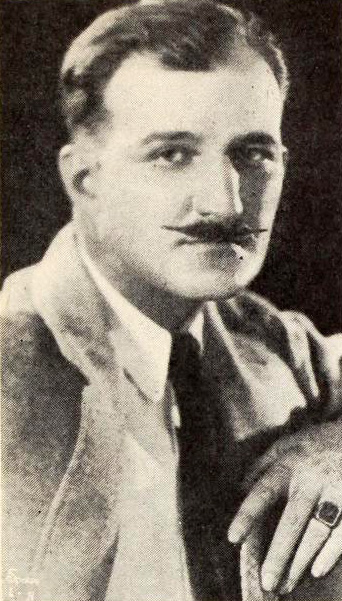
- Seiter in 1921
- Born: William Alfred Seiter; June 10, 1890; New York City, US
- Died: July 26, 1964 (aged 74); Beverly Hills, California, US
- Other names: William Seiter
- Occupation: Filmmaker
- Years active: 1915–1954
- Relatives: Ted Griffin (grandson)

Signature
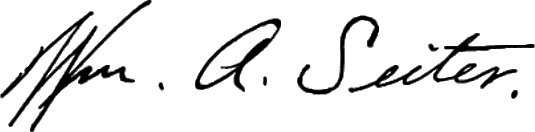

William Alfred Seiter (June 10, 1890 – July 26, 1964) was an American film director.

== Life and career ==
Seiter was born in New York City. After attending Hudson River Military Academy, Seiter broke into films in 1915 as a bit player at Mack Sennett's Keystone Studios, doubling as a cowboy. He graduated to director in 1918.

At Universal Studios in the mid-1920s, Seiter was principal director of the popular movies with Reginald Denny, most of which co-starred Seiter's then wife Laura La Plante (his second wife was actress Marian Nixon). This period also included The Beautiful and Damned and The Family Secret. Seiter earned a reputation for his charming comedies that were moderately paced and kept the laughs coming quietly, rather than resorting to obvious jokes and slapstick.

In the early sound era, Seiter helped nurture the talents of RKO's comedy duo Wheeler & Woolsey in features such as Caught Plastered (1931) and Diplomaniacs (1933). He also directed Laurel and Hardy in Sons of the Desert (1933), generally regarded as one of their best feature films. Seiter's other films include Sunny, Going Wild, Kiss Me Again, Hot Saturday, Way Back Home, Girl Crazy, Rafter Romance, Roberta, Susannah of the Mounties, Allegheny Uprising, You Were Never Lovelier, Up in Central Park, and One Touch of Venus.

Among the many stars directed by Seiter during his long career were Shirley Temple, Fred Astaire, Ginger Rogers, Irene Dunne, Henry Fonda, Margaret Sullavan, Barbara Stanwyck, Jack Haley, Deanna Durbin, Jean Arthur, John Wayne, Fred MacMurray, Lucille Ball, and Rita Hayworth.

On occasion, Seiter's creativity was stifled when restrictions were placed upon him. For the 1938 feature Room Service, a stage play had already been adapted for the Marx Brothers, limiting the action to only a few sets and forcing Seiter to stick closely to the shooting script. When Seiter ran into friction from his star—as was the case with Lou Costello in 1946's Little Giant—Seiter would respond by filming the script verbatim, without adding any nuance or creativity to the project. This may have been the reason that one prominent actress of the 1930s referred to Seiter as the most unimaginative director she'd ever worked with.

Seiter's distinctive directorial style was generally appreciated by critics (his work on the 1943 Jean Arthur-John Wayne romantic comedy A Lady Takes a Chance received raves), but his deliberate pacing was sometimes taken for slowness. Seiter was assigned to the 1947 fantasy The Bishop's Wife but producer Samuel Goldwyn disliked Seiter's measured handling of the action, and thought it needed a lighter touch; Seiter's footage was scrapped and Henry Koster took over the film. The setback was only temporary, as Seiter continued working on major motion pictures for seven more years.

On his final four films, before he retired in 1954, Seiter functioned as both producer and director. These films included The Lady Wants Mink (1953), a gentle satire of the then topical "raise your own coat" craze.

He suffered a fatal heart attack on July 26, 1964, at his home in Beverly Hills, California.

== Filmography ==
- The Honeymoon Roll (1915)
- Gold-Bricking Cupid (1915)
- In a Pinch (1919)
- Their Day of Rest (1919)
- After the Bawl (1919)
- Close to Nature (1919)
- Honeymooning (1919)
- Why Divorce? (1919)
- Moving Day (1919)
- The Little Dears (1919)
- A Sure Cure (1919)
- The Kentucky Colonel (1920)
- Hearts and Masks (1921)
- Passing Through (1921)
- The Foolish Age (1921)
- Eden and Return (1921)
- Boy Crazy (1922)
- Gay and Devilish (1922)
- The Understudy (1922)
- Up and at 'Em (1922)
- The Beautiful and Damned (1922)
- When Love Comes (1922)
- Bell Boy 13 (1923)
- Little Church Around the Corner (1923)
- Daddies (1924)
- The White Sin (1924)
- His Forgotten Wife (1924)
- Listen Lester (1924)
- The Family Secret (1924)
- Helen's Babies (1924)
- The Fast Worker (1924)
- The Mad Whirl (1925)
- Dangerous Innocence (1925)
- The Teaser (1925)
- Where Was I? (1925)
- What Happened to Jones (1926)
- Skinner's Dress Suit (1926)
- Rolling Home (1926)
- Take It from Me (1926)
- The Cheerful Fraud (1926)
- Out All Night (1927)
- The Small Bachelor (1927)
- Thanks for the Buggy Ride (1928)
- Good Morning, Judge (1928)
- Happiness Ahead (1928)
- Waterfront (1928)
- Outcast (1928)
- Synthetic Sin (1929)
- Why Be Good? (1929)
- Prisoners (1929)
- Smiling Irish Eyes (1929)
- Footlights and Fools (1929)
- The Love Racket (1929)
- Strictly Modern (1930)
- The Flirting Widow (1930)
- Back Pay (1930)
- The Truth About Youth (1930)
- Sunny (1930)
- Going Wild (1930)
- L'aviateur (1931)
- Kiss Me Again (1931)
- Big Business Girl (1931)
- Too Many Cooks (1931)
- Caught Plastered (1931)
- Way Back Home (1931)
- Peach O'Reno (1931)
- Girl Crazy (1932)
- Young Bride (1932)
- Is My Face Red? (1932)
- Hot Saturday (1932)
- If I Had a Million (1932)
- Hello, Everybody! (1933)
- Diplomaniacs (1933)
- Professional Sweetheart (1933)
- Rafter Romance (1933)
- Chance at Heaven (1933)
- Sons of the Desert (1933)
- Sing and Like It (1934)
- Love Birds (1934)
- We're Rich Again (1934)
- The Richest Girl in the World (1934)
- Roberta (1935)
- The Daring Young Man (1935)
- Orchids to You (1935)
- In Person (1935)
- If You Could Only Cook (1935)
- The Moon's Our Home (1936)
- The Case Against Mrs. Ames (1936)
- Dimples (1936)
- Stowaway (1936)
- This Is My Affair (1937)
- The Life of the Party (1937)
- Life Begins in College (1937)
- Sally, Irene and Mary (1938)
- Three Blind Mice (1938)
- Room Service (1938)
- Thanks for Everything (1938)
- The Little Princess (1939)
- Susannah of the Mounties (1939)
- Allegheny Uprising (1939)
- Hired Wife (1940)
- It's a Date (1940)
- Nice Girl? (1941)
- Appointment for Love (1941)
- Broadway (1942)
- You Were Never Lovelier (1942)
- Destroyer (1943)
- A Lady Takes a Chance (1943)
- Four Jills in a Jeep (1944)
- Belle of the Yukon (1944)
- It's a Pleasure (1945)
- The Affairs of Susan (1945)
- That Night with You (1945)
- Little Giant (1946)
- Lover Come Back (1946)
- I'll Be Yours (1947)
- Up in Central Park (1948)
- One Touch of Venus (1948)
- Borderline (1950)
- Dear Brat (1951)
- The Lady Wants Mink (1953)
- Champ for a Day (1953)
- Make Haste to Live (1954)
