= The Cheerful Fraud =

1927 film by William A. Seiter

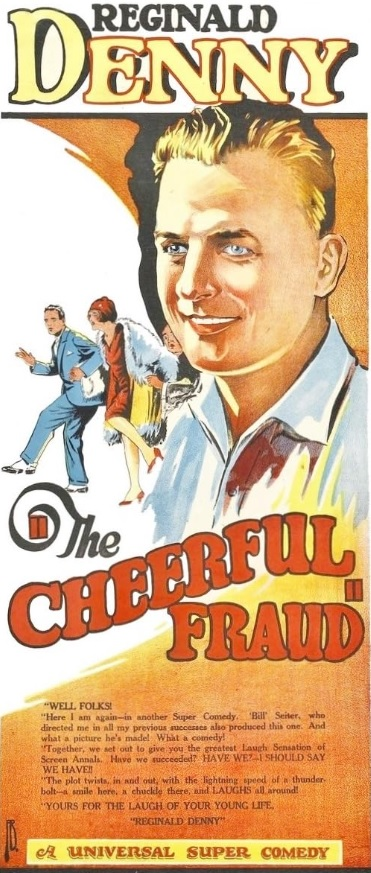
- Directed by: William A. Seiter
- Written by: Leigh Jacobson; Sam Mintz; Rex Taylor; Harvey F. Thew; William A. Seiter
- Based on: The Cheerful Fraud by Kenneth Robert Gordon Browne
- Produced by: Carl Laemmle
- Starring: Reginald Denny; Gertrude Olmstead; Otis Harlan
- Cinematography: Arthur L. Todd
- Edited by: John Rawlins
- Production company: Universal Pictures
- Distributed by: Universal Pictures
- Release date: January 16, 1927
- Running time: 70 minutes
- Country: United States
- Language: Silent (English intertitles)

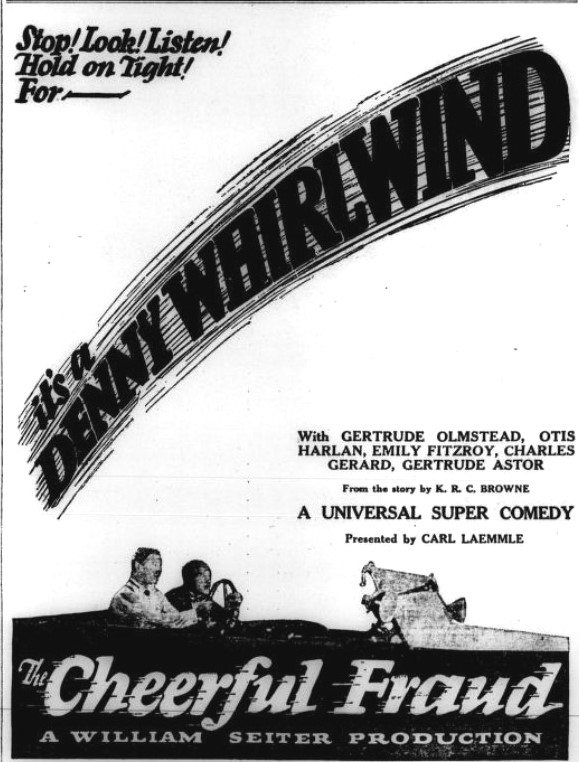
The Cheerful Fraud 1927 advertisement

The Cheerful Fraud is a 1927 American silent comedy film directed by William A. Seiter and starring Reginald Denny, Gertrude Olmstead, and Otis Harlan. It was produced and distributed by Universal Pictures. It is based on a 1925 novel of the same title by British writer Kenneth Robert Gordon Browne.

== Plot ==
Sir Michael Fairlie pretends to be the new employee at the residence owned by the Bytheways, in order to spend time with their social secretary, whom he has encountered in a London rainstorm, . Meanwhile, a notorious crook turns up at the house pretending to be Sir Michael, with an eye on stealing family jewels. The confusion is compounded when a blackmailer also arrives.

== Cast ==
- Reginald Denny as Sir Michael Fairlie
- Gertrude Olmstead as Ann Kent
- Otis Harlan as Mr. Bytheway
- Emily Fitzroy as Mrs. Bytheway
- Charles K. Gerrard as Steve
- Gertrude Astor as Rose
- Luis Alberni as Valet
- Wilson Benge as Butler

== Preservation ==
The film is preserved at the UCLA Film & Television Archive.

== Bibliography ==
- Goble, Alan. The Complete Index to Literary Sources in Film. Walter de Gruyter, 1999.
