= Otis Harlan =

American actor (1865–1940)

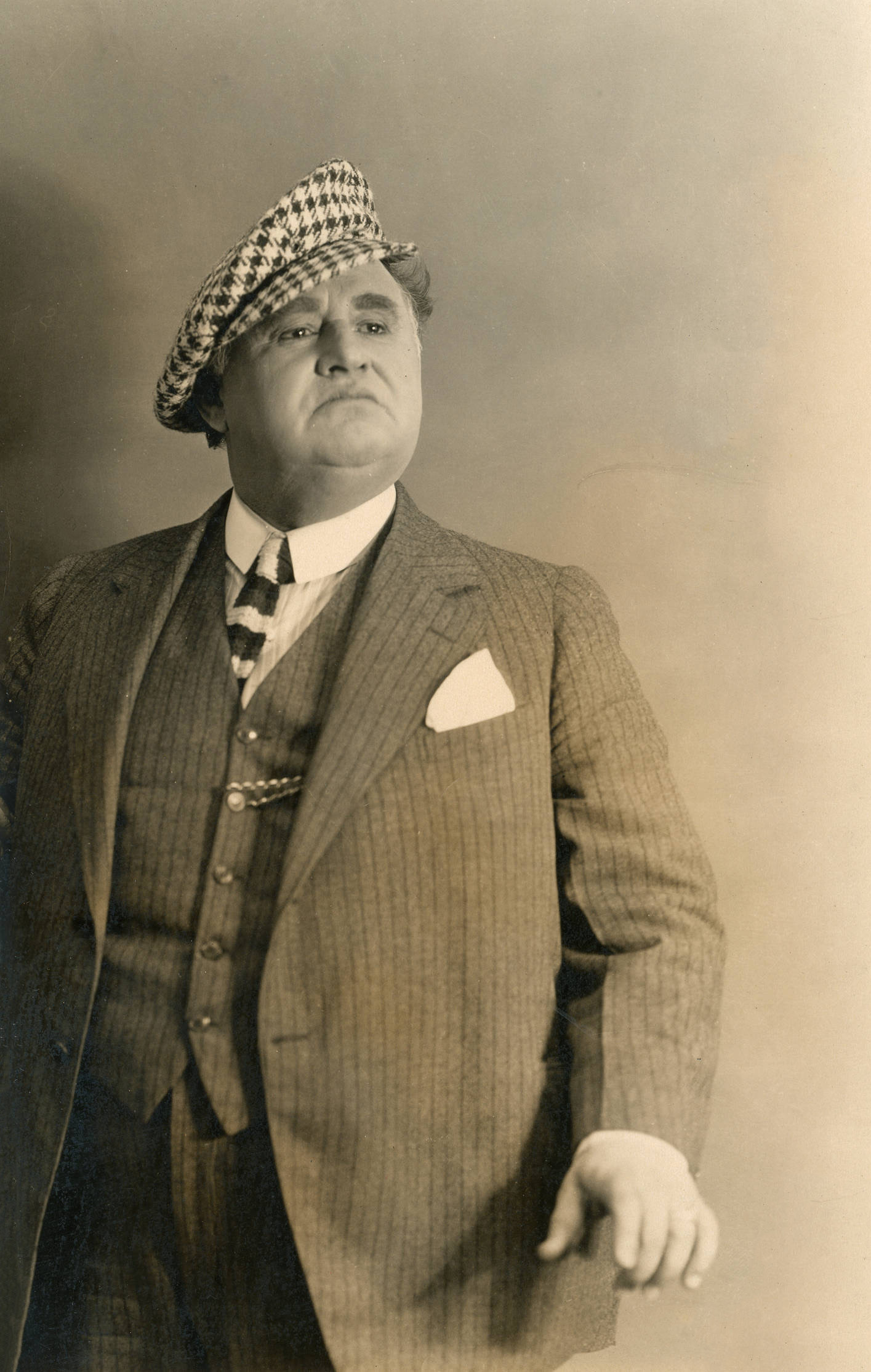
- Harlan in 1922
- Born: December 29, 1865; Zanesville, Ohio, U.S.
- Died: January 20, 1940 (aged 74); Martinsville, Indiana, U.S.
- Resting place: New South Park Cemetery, Martinsville, Indiana, U.S.
- Occupations: Actor; comedian
- Years active: 1893–1940
- Spouse: Nellie Harvey
- Children: 1
- Relatives: Kenneth Harlan (nephew)

Otis Harlan (December 29, 1865 – January 20, 1940) was an American actor and comedian. He voiced Happy, one of the Seven Dwarfs in the Disney animated film Snow White and the Seven Dwarfs. This made him the earliest born actor to feature in a Disney film and one of the earliest born known American voice actors.

== Early years ==
Harlan was born on December 29, 1865, in Zanesville, Ohio. Harlan was the uncle of the silent film era leading man, Kenneth Harlan. He studied at Gambier Military Academy, Kenyon College, and Yale.

== Career ==
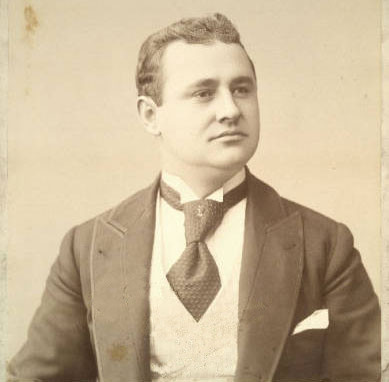
Harlan, c. 1892

Harlan debuted on stage on September 12, 1887, in "The Hole in the Ground" at the Fourteenth Street Theatre. In 1893, he appeared in Victor Herbert's The Magic Knight. In 1911 he starred in Little Boy Blue on Broadway. He was playing in vaudeville shows by 1911, appearing in Irving Berlin's ragtime musicals. Harlan also played the role of Cap'n Andy in the first, part-talkie film version of "Show Boat" (1929). He was also seen as the Master of Ceremonies in the sound prologue that accompanied the film. In 1935, Harlan played the role of Starveling in Max Reinhardt's 1935 film version of Shakespeare's A Midsummer Night's Dream. In 1937, Harlan provided the voice of "Happy", one of the Seven Dwarfs in the Disney animated film Snow White and the Seven Dwarfs. In the same year he also appeared in the Our Gang short Roamin' Holiday. Contrary to popular belief, Harlan did not voice Mr. Mole in Bambi. Mr. Mole was voiced by Bambi's story director, Perce Pearce.

Harlan retired in the summer of 1939.

== Personal life and death ==
Harlan married Nellie Harvey in Camden, New Jersey and had a daughter named Marion.

In April 1938 Harlan had a stroke during a rehearsal. He was in critical condition in Hollywood Hospital, "conscious at intervals".

Harlan died from a heart attack on January 20, 1940, in Martinsville, Indiana, aged 74.

== Selected filmography ==
- A Black Sheep (1915) as Goodrich Mudd
- A Stranger in New York (1916, Short) as The Stranger
- The Resurrection of Dan Packard (1916)
- The Romance Promoters (1920) as Minor Role
- The Girl in the Taxi (1921) as Alexis
- Keeping Up with Lizzie (1921) as Sam Henshaw
- The Foolish Age (1921) as Old Top: Carr
- Diamonds Adrift (1921) as Brick McCann
- Two Kinds of Women (1922) as Major Langworthy
- The Right That Failed (1922) as Mr. Duffey
- Gay and Devilish (1922) as Peter Armitage (the uncle)
- The Understudy (1922) as Mr. Manning
- Up and at 'Em (1922) as William Jackson
- The Ladder Jinx (1922) as Thams Gridley
- The Eternal Flame (1922) as Abbé Conrand
- Without Compromise (1922) as Dr. Evans
- The World's a Stage (1922) as Richard Manseld Bishop
- The Spider and the Rose (1923) as The Secretary
- Truxton King (1923) as Hobbs
- Main Street (1923) as Ezra Stowbody
- The Brass Bottle (1923) as Captain of the Guard
- The Victor (1923) as Chewing Gum Baron
- The Barefoot Boy (1923) as Wilson
- Pioneer Trails (1923) as 'Easy Aaron' Cropsey
- The Near Lady (1923) as Herman Schultz
- The Lullaby (1924) as Thomas Elliott
- The Clean Heart (1924)
- The Dramatic Life of Abraham Lincoln (1924) as Denton Offut
- George Washington Jr. (1924) as Sen. Hopkins
- The White Sin (1924) as Judge Langley
- Mademoiselle Midnight (1924) as Padre Francisco
- One Law for the Woman (1924) as Judge Blake
- Welcome Stranger (1924) as Seth Trimble
- Captain Blood (1924) as Corliss
- Code of the Wilderness (1924) as Uncle Jephon
- The Dixie Handicap (1924) as The Old Retainer
- The Redeeming Sin (1925) as Papa chuchu
- Oh Doctor! (1925) as Mr. Clinch
- How Baxter Butted In (1925) as Amos Nichols
- Nine and Three-Fifths Seconds (1925) as Motherbund
- Fine Clothes (1925) as Alfred
- Where Was I? (1925) as Bennett
- Lightnin' (1925) as Zeb
- The Limited Mail (1925) as Mr. Joffrey
- Dollar Down (1925) as Norris
- Thunder Mountain (1925) as Jeff Coulter
- The Perfect Clown (1925) as The Boss
- The Pay-Off (1926) as The Young Woman's Father
- What Happened to Jones (1926) as Ebenezer Goodly
- Winning the Futurity (1926) as Tom Giles
- The Prince of Pilsen (1926) as Bndit Chief
- The Midnight Message (1926) as Richard Macy
- 3 Bad Men (1926) as Zach Little
- The Unknown Cavalier (1926) as Judge Blowfly Jones
- The Whole Town's Talking (1926) as George Simmonns
- The Cheerful Fraud (1926) as Mr. Bytheway
- The Silent Rider (1927) as Sourdough Jackson
- Don't Tell the Wife (1927) as Magistrate
- Down the Strech (1927) as Babe Dilley
- The Student Prince in Old Heidelberg (1927) as Old Ruder
- Silk Stockings (1927) as Judge Foster
- Galloping Fury (1927) as Pop Tully
- The Shepherd of the Hills (1928) as By Thunder
- Good Morning, Judge (1928) as Jerry Snoot
- The Grip of the Yukon (1928) as Farrell O'Neil
- The Speed Classic (1928) as The Thirsty One
- Silks and Saddles (1929) as Jimmy McKee
- Clear the Decks (1929)
- Show Boat (1929) as Capt. Andy Hawks
- Broadway (1929) as 'Porky' Thompson
- His Lucky Day (1929) as Jerome Van Dyne
- Girl Overboard (1929) as Joe Evans
- Barnum Was Right (1929) as Samuel Locke
- The Mississippi Gambler (1929) as Tiny Beardsley
- Take the Heir (1930) as John Walker
- Embarrassing Moments (1930) as Adam Fuller
- Parade of the West (1930) as Professor Clayton
- Loose Ankles (1930) as Major Rupert Harper
- Dames Ahoy! (1930) as Bill Jones
- Captain of the Guard (1930) as Jacques
- The King of Jazz (1930) as Charles's Intended Father-in-Law
- Mountain Justice (1930) as Jud McTavish
- Man to Man (1930) as Rip Henry
- Millie (1931) as Luke - Counterman (uncredited)
- Aloha (1931) as Old Ben
- Morals for Women (1931) as Mr. Johnston
- Air Eagles (1931) as Mr. Ramsey
- The Big Shot (1931) as Doctor Peaslee
- Partners (1932) as Auctioneer
- Racing Youth (1932) as Dave
- The Rider of Death Valley (1932) as Peck
- Ride Him, Cowboy (1932) as Judge Jones
- No Living Witness (1932) as Pop Everett
- That's My Boy (1932) as Mayor
- Women Won't Tell (1932) as Henry Jones
- The Telegraph Trail (1933) as Uncle Zeke Keller
- Mister Mugg (1933, Short)
- Laughing at Life (1933) as Businessman #1
- Doctor Bull (1933) as Agitator (uncredited)
- Marriage on Approval (1933) as Justice of the Peace Michael O'Connors
- Hoop-La (1933) as Town Councilman - Side Show Customer (uncredited)
- The Sin of Nora Moran (1933) as Mr. Moran
- Palooka (1934) as Doorman Riley (uncredited)
- Let's Talk It Over (1934) as Purser
- I Can't Escape (1934) as Jim Bonn
- The Old Fashioned Way (1934) as Mr. Wendelschaffer (uncredited)
- King Kelly of the U.S.A. (1934) as Prime Minister
- Young and Beautiful (1934) as Sugar Daddy (uncredited)
- Music in the Air (1934) as Baker (uncredited)
- Life Returns (1935) as Dr. Henderson
- The Hoosier Schoolmaster (1935) as Squire Hawkins
- Chinatown Squad (1935) as Dad, on Sacramento Street (uncredited)
- Western Frontier (1935) as Cookie
- Diamond Jim (1935) as Drunk (uncredited)
- A Midsummer Night's Dream (1935) as Starveling - the Tailor
- Dr. Socrates (1935) as Fisher (uncredited)
- Hitch Hike Lady (1935) as Mayor Loomis
- The Singing Kid (1936) as Bank Clerk (uncredited)
- Can This Be Dixie? (1936) as Thoma Jefferson Peachtree
- Roamin' Holiday (1937, Short) as Hiram Jenks
- Western Gold (1937) as Jake
- Snow White and the Seven Dwarfs (1937) as Happy (voice, uncredited)
- Self Control (1938) as Uncle Smiley (voice, uncredited)
- Mr. Boggs Steps Out (1938) as Abner Katz
- Scandal Street (1938) as Taxicab Driver (uncredited)
- Outlaws of Sonora (1938) as Pool player
- The Texans (1938) as Henry (uncredited) (final film role)
