= His Mother's Boy =

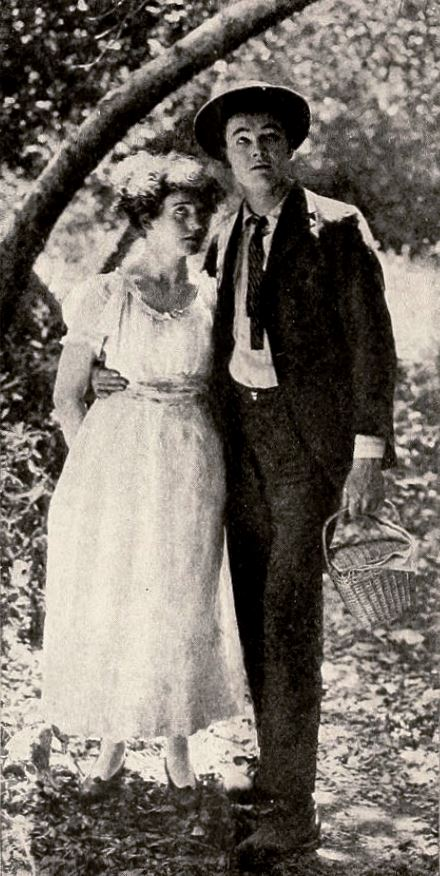
- Still with Doris May and Charles Ray
- Directed by: Victor Schertzinger
- Screenplay by: Rupert Hughes (story); Ella Stuart Carson (scenario)
- Produced by: Thomas H. Ince
- Starring: Charles Ray; Doris May; William Elmer; Josef Swickard; Jerome Storm; Gertrude Claire
- Cinematography: Chester A. Lyons
- Production company: Thomas H. Ince Corporation
- Distributed by: Paramount Pictures
- Release date: December 24, 1917
- Running time: 50 minutes
- Country: United States
- Language: Silent (English intertitles)

His Mother's Boy is a 1917 American silent drama film directed by Victor Schertzinger and written by Ella Stuart Carson. The film stars Charles Ray, Doris May, William Elmer, Josef Swickard, Jerome Storm, and Gertrude Claire. It is based on the short story "Where Life is Marked Down" by Rupert Hughes. The film was released on December 24, 1917, by Paramount Pictures.

== Plot ==
As described in a film magazine, Matthew Denton finds out that, because the Centipede oil wells do not pay a dividend, the villagers consider his father to be a swindler. He leaves his mother and New England home to go to Centipede, Texas, to ascertain the cause of the shortage of oil. He becomes an employee under the direction of Banty Jones, foreman of the wells, and a crook. He falls in love with Mabel Glenny, whom Jones considers to be his "gal." When Mabel shows Matthew her engagement ring, Jones gives him a specified amount of time to get out of town. However, Matthew has found a valve that causes oil to be diverted to another company. He also learns that Jones is receiving the benefit from these stolen oil sales. A fight breaks out between the two men with Matthew the winner. Jones, humiliated, leaves, and Mabel is proud of Matthew. Back home the villagers are happy that the oil wells are safe and that dividends will be forthcoming again.

== Cast ==
- Charles Ray as Matthew Denton
- Doris May as Mabel Glenny
- William Elmer as Banty Jones
- Josef Swickard as Tom Glenny
- Jerome Storm as Jimmie Noonan
- Gertrude Claire as Mrs. Denton
- Lydia Knott as Mrs. Glenny
- Charlotte Woods as A Country Girl (uncredited)

== Reception ==
Like many American films of the time, His Mother's Boy was subject to cuts by city and state film censorship boards. The Chicago Board of Censors required a cut of the shooting of a man in the barroom, the intertitle "Well, he can have you when I get through with you", and two closeups of men in a fight where Matthew bites the man's hand, Matthew is thrown against the wall, and Matthew shoots the man.
