= Bull Montana =

Italian-American wrestler

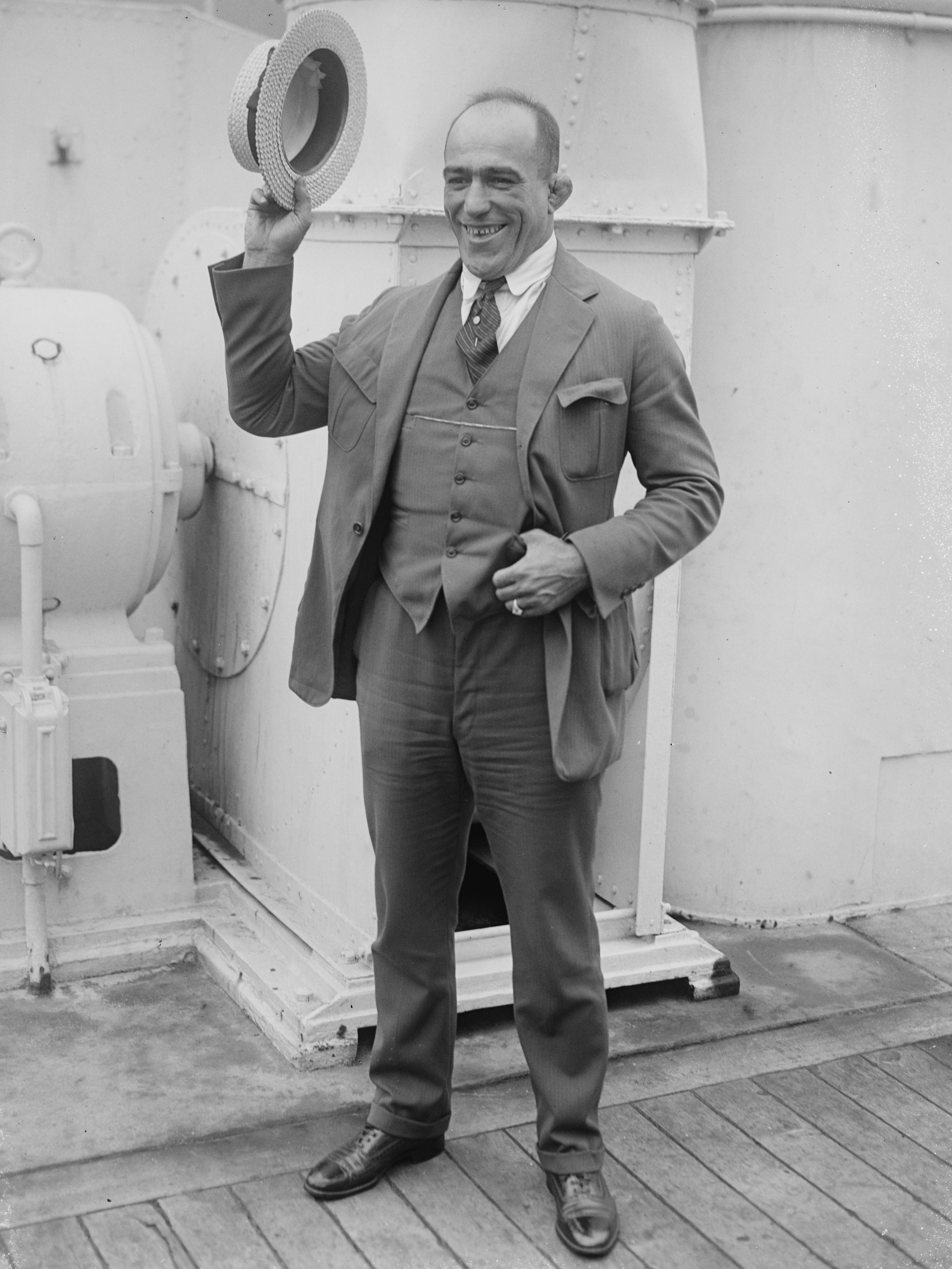
- Montana aboard ship, 1922

Personal information
- Born: Luigi Montagna; May 16, 1887 Voghera, Italy
- Died: January 24, 1950 (aged 62) Los Angeles, California, U.S.

Professional wrestling career
- Ring name: Bull Montana
- Billed height: 5 ft 10 in (178 cm)
- Billed weight: 250 lb (113 kg)
- Billed from: Los Angeles, California
- Trained by: Gene Dundee
- Debut: 1925
- Retired: 1948

Lewis Montagna (born Luigi Montagna; May 16, 1887 – January 24, 1950), better known as Bull Montana, was an Italian-American professional wrestler, boxer and actor.

== Biography ==
Born in Voghera, Italy, into a poor country family — and at a time when Italy was a predominantly rural country — with limited prospects, at 19 years old, Montagna made the decision to move to the United States. He arrived in New York in 1906 and continued to do heavy work there, first in Connecticut at a stone quarry and then in a Pennsylvania mine. Having also practiced Greco-Roman wrestling since childhood, after a few years he entered the professional wrestling circuit (better known at the time as "catch as catch can"), taking the name of Bull Montana as a pseudonym. At the same time he also became a boxer, where in 1916 he was called to act as sparring partner for Jack Dempsey, then world heavyweight champion. Among his friends was Abe "The Newsboy" Hollandersky, boxer, wrestler and extra in the cinema, who according to some supported Montagna in helping him fly his autobiography in 1930. In the early 1920s, Montana often wrestled with his friend Jack Dempsey prior to some of Dempsey's larger fights to help entertain the press and spectators.

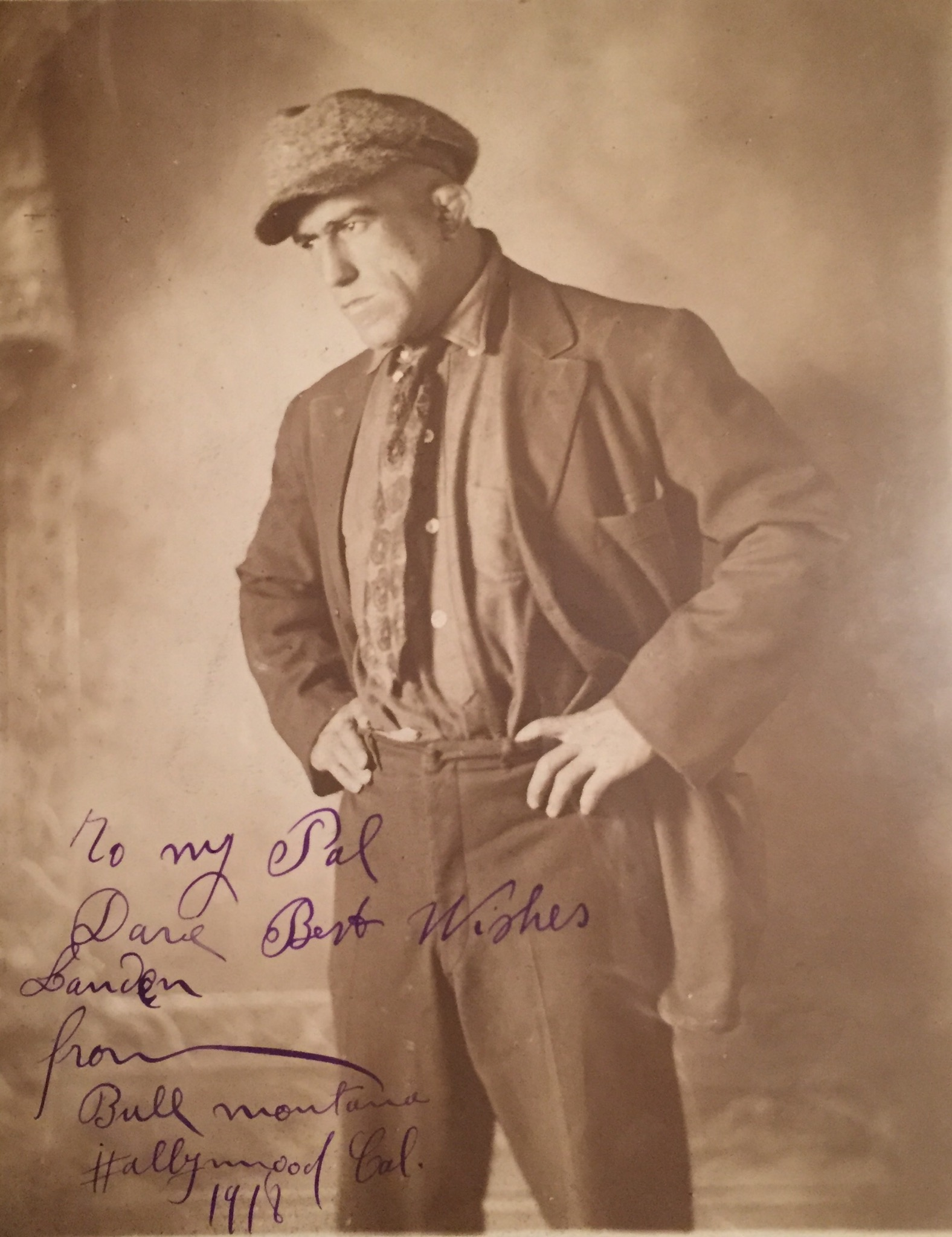
Montana in 1918

In 1917, in a New York gymnasium, he was noticed by producer Douglas Fairbanks, who wanted him beside him in the film In Again, Out Again; from here he entered the world of cinema and in 1919 appeared as a macabre villain in Maurice Tourneur's masterpiece Victory, alongside Lon Chaney. In 1921, he was finally granted US citizenship and changed his full name to Lewis Montagna. In 1922, he became the protagonist of a successful series of parodies produced by Hunt Stromberg. In 1925, given his size and his appearance, he was given the part of the ape-man in the film The Lost World, probably the part that gave him the greatest fame. Montagna's fortune increased by collaborating first with Rodolfo Valentino in the films The Four Horsemen of the Apocalypse and The Son of the Sheik, then with Buster Keaton in Palooka from Paducah. He continued to act until the late 1930s, mainly playing antagonist parts, similar to Louis Wolheim; he was also seen alongside Buster Crabbe in the 1936 series Flash Gordon. In his film career, which lasted from 1917 to 1937, Montagna took part in nearly 90 films.

== Personal life ==
Once he became wealthy enough, he returned to Italy in 1922, finding his mother and staying for about a month. Despite his physical appearance and background as a wrestler, Bull Montana was known for being polite.

In 1924, he met the dancer Jackie LaVerne, originally from Georgia, with whom he lived until 1928 when Montagna reported her and had her arrested for hitting him on the head with a slipper. The woman was sentenced to 60 days in prison but she only served two as Montagna himself paid her $100 bail and asked the judge to overturn the guilty verdict and the prison sentence. The judge commuted the two-year probation sentence and Montana permanently split from LaVerne.

In 1929, he met Mary Mathews Poulson, a young widow of 23, whom he married on September 21 of that year; the marriage ended in a divorce on August 21, 1931.

Bull Montana died on January 24, 1950, at the age of 62, in Los Angeles. He was buried in Calvary Cemetery.

== Selected filmography ==
- In Again, Out Again (1917)
- Wild and Woolly (1917) (uncredited)
- Down to Earth (1917)
- The Border Legion (1918)
- He Comes Up Smiling (1918)
- Fair Enough (1918)
- His Majesty, the American (1919)
- The Unpardonable Sin (1919)
- Victory (1919)
- When the Clouds Roll by (1919)
- In for Thirty Days (1919)
- One-Thing-at-a-Time O'Day (1919)
- Easy to Make Money (1919)
- Brass Buttons (1919)
- Daredevil Jack (1920)
- Treasure Island (1920)
- The Girl in Number 29 (1920)
- The Mollycoddle (1920)
- Hearts Are Trumps (1920)
- Go and Get It (1920)
- What Women Love (1920)
- Hard Luck (1921)
- One Wild Week (1921)
- The Foolish Age (1921)
- Crazy to Marry (1921)
- The Timber Queen (1922)
- Gay and Devilish (1922)
- Held to Answer (1923)
- Breaking Into Society (1923)
- Hollywood (1923) cameo
- Secrets of the Night (1924)
- Laughing at Danger (1924)
- Dick Turpin (1925)
- The Lost World (1925)
- Manhattan Madness (1925)
- Bashful Buccaneer (1925)
- Stop, Look and Listen (1926)
- The Skyrocket (1926)
- On the Front Page (1926)
- How to Handle Women (1928)
- Good Morning, Judge (1928)
- The Show of Shows (1929)
- Glorifying the American Girl (1929)
- Palooka from Paducah (1935)
