= The Border Patrol (film) =

1928 film

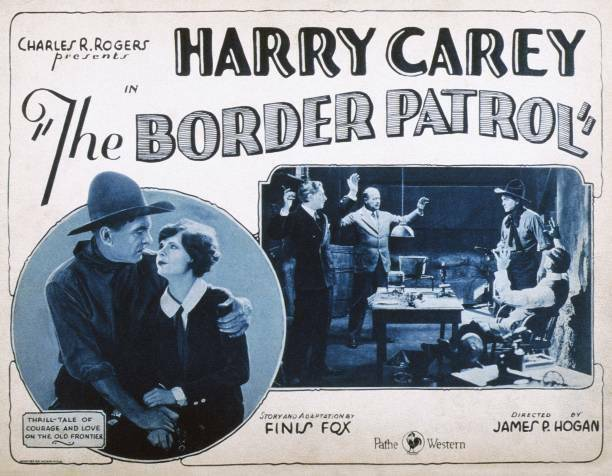
- Directed by: James P. Hogan
- Written by: Finis Fox
- Produced by: Charles R. Rogers
- Starring: Harry Carey
- Cinematography: Sol Polito
- Edited by: Harry Marker
- Distributed by: Pathé Exchange
- Release date: December 23, 1928
- Running time: 50 minutes
- Country: United States
- Languages: Silent; English intertitles

The Border Patrol is a 1928 American silent Western film directed by James P. Hogan, released through Pathé Exchange and starring Harry Carey.

== Cast ==
- Harry Carey as Bill Storm
- Kathleen Collins as Beverly Dix
- Phillips Smalley as Conway Dix
- Richard Tucker as Earl Hanway
- James Neill as Lefty Waterman
- James A. Marcus as Capt. Bonham (as James Marcus)

== Censorship ==
When The Border Patrol was released, many states and cities in the United States had censor boards that could require cuts or other eliminations before the film could be shown. The Kansas censor board ordered a cut of an intertitle with the caption "Looks like sheik's losing his sex appeal." The Kansas board was noted as eliminating all captions in films submitted in 1928 with the phrase "sex appeal."

== Preservation ==
A print of The Border Patrol is preserved at EYE Film Institute Netherlands.
