= The Jailbird =

1920 film by Lloyd Ingraham

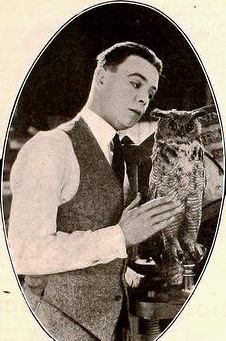
- Still with Douglas MacLean
- Directed by: Lloyd Ingraham
- Screenplay by: Julien Josephson
- Produced by: Thomas H. Ince
- Starring: Douglas MacLean; Doris May; Louis Morrison; William Courtright; Wilbur Higby; Otto Hoffman
- Cinematography: Bert Cann
- Edited by: Harry Marker
- Production company: Thomas H. Ince Corporation
- Distributed by: Paramount Pictures
- Release date: October 10, 1920
- Running time: 50 minutes
- Country: United States
- Language: Silent (English intertitles)

The Jailbird is a 1920 American silent comedy drama film directed by Lloyd Ingraham and written by Julien Josephson. The film stars Douglas MacLean, Doris May, Louis Morrison, William Courtright, Wilbur Higby, and Otto Hoffman. The film was released on October 10, 1920, by Paramount Pictures.

== Plot ==
As described in a film magazine, Shakespeare Clancy, adroit in the art of opening safes, escapes from prison when his term still has six months to run and returns with 'Skeeter' Burns, a friend who has just finished his sentence, to Dodson, Kansas, where Shakespeare has inherited a run-down newspaper and some worthless real estate. His first issue of the newspaper antagonizes the people of the town, and he promotes an oil stock scheme to get their money, setting up a well on his property. After he has collected money from practically all of the town residents, he prepares for his getaway only to find that Alice Whitney, a young woman he has come to love, owns two thousand dollars of the worthless stock. An unexpected gusher from the well on his property paves the way for a happy ending, with Shakespeare returning to prison to complete his interrupted sentence.

== Cast ==
- Douglas MacLean as Shakespeare Clancy
- Doris May as Alice Whitney
- Louis Morrison as 'Skeeter' Burns
- William Courtright as Noah Gibbs
- Wilbur Higby as Joel Harvey
- Otto Hoffman as Elkemah Pardee
- Monte Collins as Asa Grider
- Bert Woodruff as Grandpa Binney
- Edith Yorke as Mrs. Whitney
- Joseph Hazelton as Alva Finch

== Preservation status ==
A copy of The Jailbird is preserved in the Library of Congress collection.
