= Trumpet Island =

1920 film directed by Tom Terriss

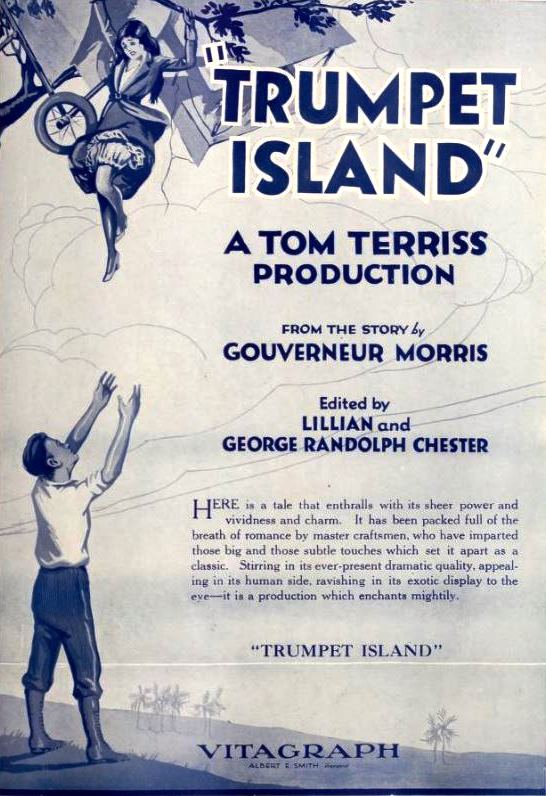
- Advertisement
- Directed by: Tom Terriss
- Written by: Rudolph De Cordova; Lillian Christy Chester; George Randolph Chester
- Story by: Gouverneur Morris
- Produced by: Albert E. Smith; Tom Terriss
- Starring: Marguerite De La Motte; Wallace MacDonald; Hallam Cooley
- Cinematography: Friend Baker; Ernest Haller
- Production company: Vitagraph Company of America
- Distributed by: Vitagraph Company of America
- Release date: September 1920
- Running time: 70 minutes
- Country: United States
- Language: Silent (English intertitles)

Trumpet Island is a 1920 American silent drama film directed by Tom Terriss and starring Marguerite De La Motte, Wallace MacDonald, and Hallam Cooley. A print of Trumpet Island exists and is available on DVD.

== Cast ==
- Marguerite De La Motte as Eve de Merincourt
- Wallace MacDonald as Richard Bedell
- Hallam Cooley as Allen Marsh
- Josef Swickard as Jacques de Merincourt
- Arthur Hoyt as Henry Caron
- Marcella Daly as Hilda
- Percy Challenger as Valinsky

== Bibliography ==
- George A. Katchmer. Eighty Silent Film Stars: Biographies and Filmographies of the Obscure to the Well Known. McFarland, 1991.
