= Harry Marker =

American Oscar-nominated film editor (1899–1990)

- Born: William Harry Marker Jr. October 7, 1899; Tipton, Indiana, United States
- Died: October 18, 1990 (aged 91); New Milford, Connecticut, United States
- Occupation: Film editor
- Years active: 1920–64

Harry Marker (October 7, 1899 – October 18, 1990) was an American Oscar-nominated film editor, who also worked in the television medium. Over the course of his 45-year career, he worked on more than 100 films and television shows. In 1946 he was nominated for an Oscar for Best Film Editing for The Bells of St. Mary's.

== Life and career ==
Born William Harry Marker Jr. on October 7, 1899, in Tipton, Indiana, he entered the film industry at the age of 17, as an editor on the 1918 silent film, Selfish Yates. During the silent film era, he would edit 15 films, including such notable movies as: The Jailbird (1920), directed by Lloyd Ingraham and starring Douglas MacLean; the 1920 comedy Silk Hosiery, directed by Fred Niblo and starring Enid Bennett; The Rookie's Return (1920), a comedy directed by Jack Nelson and starring Douglas MacLean; the 1928 Western, The Border Patrol, starring Harry Carey and directed by James P. Hogan; and Burning Bridges (1928), again starring Carey and directed by Hogan;

During the sound era, Marker worked on many notable films and with some very notable directors, including: William Wyler's 1929 romantic comedy, The Love Trap, starring Laura La Plante; the 1930 Wyler Western, Hell's Heroes, based on Peter B. Kyne's novel, The Three Godfathers; 1932's East Is West, starring Lupe Vélez, Lew Ayres, and Edward G. Robinson; the 1936 version of The Last of the Mohicans, directed by George B. Seitz and starring Randolph Scott, Binnie Barnes, and Henry Wilcoxon; 1938's The Saint in New York, the first film appearance of Simon Templar, a.k.a. "The Saint"; and the 1939 melodrama Five Came Back, directed by John Farrow and starring Chester Morris and Lucille Ball.

Marker would continue to work steadily through the 1940s and 1950s. Some of the more notable films he worked on include: Stranger on the Third Floor, a 1940 film noir starring Peter Lorre; A Bill of Divorcement (1940), starring Maureen O'Hara and Adolphe Menjou, and directed by John Farrow; the romantic comedy starring Gene Raymond and Wendy Barrie, Cross-Country Romance, Play Girl (1941), another romantic comedy, this one starring Kay Francis; the second film in the Falcon franchise, A Date with the Falcon (1942), starring George Sanders (he would also edit the next Falcon film, The Falcon Takes Over that same year); the 1943 comedy starring the team of Wally Brown and Alan Carney, The Adventures of a Rookie; the Academy Award-nominated musical Music in Manhattan, starring Anne Shirley; and the 1945 psychological thriller, The Spiral Staircase, directed by Robert Siodmak.

1945 would also see Marker reach the pinnacle of his career, when he was nominated for the Academy Award for Best Film Editing for the classic drama, The Bells of St. Mary's, starring Bing Crosby and Ingrid Bergman. He would lose to Robert J. Kern for National Velvet. His next picture was another Oscar-winning film, the 1947 comedy-drama, The Farmer's Daughter, starring Loretta Young, Joseph Cotten, and Ethel Barrymore, and was directed by H. C. Potter. Other notable films he worked on during this period include: the classic 1948 comedy Mr. Blandings Builds His Dream House, again directed by H. C. Potter, and starring Cary Grant, Myrna Loy, and Melvyn Douglas; Rachel and the Stranger, a 1948 Western starring Loretta Young, William Holden, and Robert Mitchum; the romantic comedy, Every Girl Should Be Married (1948), starring Cary Grant and Betsy Drake; and in 1949 he edited another romantic comedy, Holiday Affair, starring Robert Mitchum and Janet Leigh.

During the 1950s Marker would continue to work on notable films, before segueing into the television industry. His 1950 films include: the psychological thriller directed by Mel Ferrer, The Secret Fury, starring Claudette Colbert and Robert Ryan; the Bette Davis vehicle, Payment on Demand (1951), which also stars Barry Sullivan; the 1951 color musical, Two Tickets to Broadway, starring Tony Martin and Janet Leigh; the musical comedy Double Dynamite, starring Jane Russell, Groucho Marx, and Frank Sinatra; the 1953 romantic comedy Susan Slept Here, starring Debbie Reynolds and Dick Powell, in his last screen appearance; the Civil War Western, Great Day in the Morning, starring Robert Stack and Virginia Mayo; the 1956 musical comedy, Bundle of Joy, starring Debbie Reynolds and Eddie Fisher; the cold war action film Jet Pilot, starring John Wayne and Janet Leigh, and directed by Josef von Sternberg; and 1958's musical comedy The Girl Most Likely, starring Jane Powell and Cliff Robertson;

Marker's final film editing of the job of the 1950s was Thunder Road, a 1958 crime drama starring Robert Mitchum. After this film, Marker took a break from the big screen and spent the rest of the decade, and the first half of the next, concentrating on television. Over the next five years he would work on a number of television shows, including Behind Closed Doors (1959), Lassie (1959), Wanted: Dead or Alive (1961), and The Rifleman (1962). Marker returned to feature films in 1963, working on the independent feature, Decision at Midnight, and his final credit was in 1964, on the drama Voice of the Hurricane.

Marker died on October 18, 1990, in New Milford, Connecticut.

== Filmography ==
(Per AFI database)

- The Jailbird (1920) (as William H. Marker)
- Silk Hosiery (1920) (as William H. Marker Jr.)
- The Rookie's Return (1920) (as William H. Marker Jr.)
- Her Husband's Friend (1920) (as H. Marker Jr.)
- Tiger Thompson (1924)
- The Border Patrol (1928)
- Burning Bridges (1928)
- The Fearless Rider (1928)
- A Made-to-Order Hero (1928)
- The Michigan Kid (1928)
- The Price of Fear (1928)
- Put 'Em Up (1928)
- Thunder Riders (1928)
- The Wild West Show (1928)
- His Lucky Day (1929)
- The Love Trap (1929)
- The Sky Skidder (1929)
- Slim Fingers (1929)
- Wolves of the City (1929)
- East Is West (1930)
- Hell's Heroes (1930)
- Hide-Out (1930)
- One Man Law (1931)
- The Secret of the Chateau (1934)
- Rendezvous at Midnight (1935)
- The Last of the Mohicans (1936)
- Behind the Headlines (1937)
- Flight from Glory (1937)
- Living on Love (1937)
- Night Spot (1938)
- Crashing Hollywood (1938)
- Annabel Takes a Tour (1938)
- Life Returns (1938)
- Sky Giant (1938)
- The Saint in New York (1938)
- Smashing the Rackets (1938)
- This Marriage Business (1938)
- They Made Her a Spy (1939)
- Twelve Crowded Hours (1939) (as Henry Marker )
- Full Confession (1939)
- Pacific Liner (1939)
- Five Came Back (1939)
- Sorority House (1939)
- Reno (1939)
- Stranger on the Third Floor (1940)
- Curtain Call (1940)
- Cross-Country Romance (1940)
- Married and in Love (1940)
- Wagon Train (1940)
- A Bill of Divorcement (1940)
- Lady Scarface (1941)
- Play Girl (1941)
- Repent at Leisure (1941)
- A Date with the Falcon (1942)
- The Falcon Takes Over (1942)
- Highways by Night (1942)
- Mexican Spitfire's Elephant (1942)
- Ladies' Day (1943)
- Mexican Spitfire's Blessed Event (1943)
- Petticoat Larceny (1943)
- Rookies in Burma (1943)
- The Adventures of a Rookie (1943)
- Music in Manhattan (1944)
- My Pal Wolf (1944)
- Seven Days Ashore (1944)
- The Bells of St. Mary's (1945)
- Pan-Americana (1945)
- Sing Your Way Home (1945)
- The Spiral Staircase (1946)
- The Farmer's Daughter (1947)
- A Likely Story (1947)
- Night Song (1948)
- Every Girl Should Be Married (1948)
- Mr. Blandings Builds His Dream House (1948)
- Rachel and the Stranger (1948)
- Holiday Affair (1949)
- The Secret Fury (1950)
- Double Dynamite (1951)
- Payment on Demand (1951)
- Two Tickets to Broadway (1951)
- Plunder of the Sun (1953)
- Susan Slept Here (1954)
- The Americano (1955)
- Rage at Dawn (1955)
- The Treasure of Pancho Villa (1955)
- Bundle of Joy (1956)
- Great Day in the Morning (1956)
- Tension at Table Rock (1956)
- Jet Pilot (1957)
- The Girl Most Likely (1958)
- Thunder Road (1958)
- Voice of the Hurricane (1964)
