= Doris May =

American actress (1902–1984)

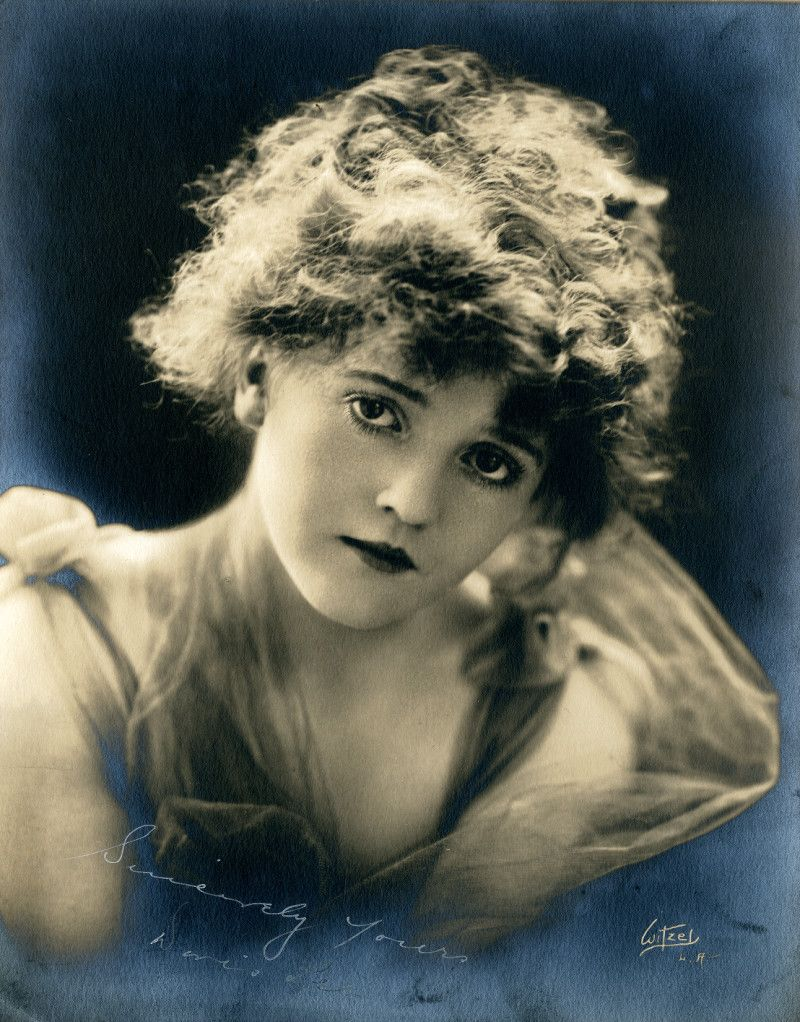
- May, c. 1920
- Born: Helen Gregory Garrett; October 15, 1902; Seattle, Washington, U.S.
- Died: May 12, 1984 (aged 81); Los Angeles, California, U.S.
- Other name: Doris Lee
- Education: Broadway High School
- Occupation: Actress
- Years active: 1917 - 1927 (film)
- Spouse: Wallace MacDonald (1921-1978, his death)
- Relatives: Otis Garrett (brother)

Doris May (born Helen Gregory Garrett; October 15, 1902 – May 12, 1984), billed initially as Doris Lee, was an American actress of the silent era. She appeared in 29 films between 1917 and 1927, generally as a leading lady. Most of her roles were in westerns and comedies, although she also starred in some melodramas.

== Early life and career ==
Born in Seattle, Washington, on October 15, 1902, May was the eldest of two children born to sportswriter George E. Garrett, aka Willie Green. She attended Broadway High School.

In 1917, prior to her first credited screen role ("Mabel Glennie" in His Mother's Boy), May was the double for Mary Pickford, in The Little American.

== Personal life and death ==
May was the sister of screenwriter Otis Garrett.

May married actor and producer Wallace MacDonald in Los Angeles on May 5, 1921, and they remained wed until his death in 1978.

== Partial filmography ==
- The Little American (1917) as Mary Pickford's double (uncredited)
- His Mother's Boy (1917)
- The Hired Man (1918)
- Playing the Game (1918)
- Green Eyes (1918)
- The Law of the North (1918)
- The Girl Dodger (1919)
- Hay Foot, Straw Foot (1919)
- 23 1/2 Hours' Leave (1919)
- What's Your Husband Doing? (1920)
- Mary's Ankle (1920)
- Let's Be Fashionable (1920)
- The Jailbird (1920)
- The Rookie's Return (1920)
- Peck's Bad Boy (1921)
- The Foolish Matrons (1921)
- Eden and Return (1921)
- The Bronze Bell (1921)
- The Foolish Age (1921)
- Up and at 'Em (1922)
- The Understudy (1922)
- Gay and Devilish (1922)
- Boy Crazy (1922)
- The Gunfighter (1923)
- The Common Law (1923)
- Conductor 1492 (1924)
- The Deadwood Coach (1924)
- Faithful Wives (1926)

== Bibliography ==
- Ken Wlaschin. The Silent Cinema in Song, 1896-1929: An Illustrated History and Catalog of Songs Inspired by the Movies and Stars, with a List of Recordings. McFarland & Company, 2009.
