= Boy Crazy (film) =

1922 film directed by William A. Seiter

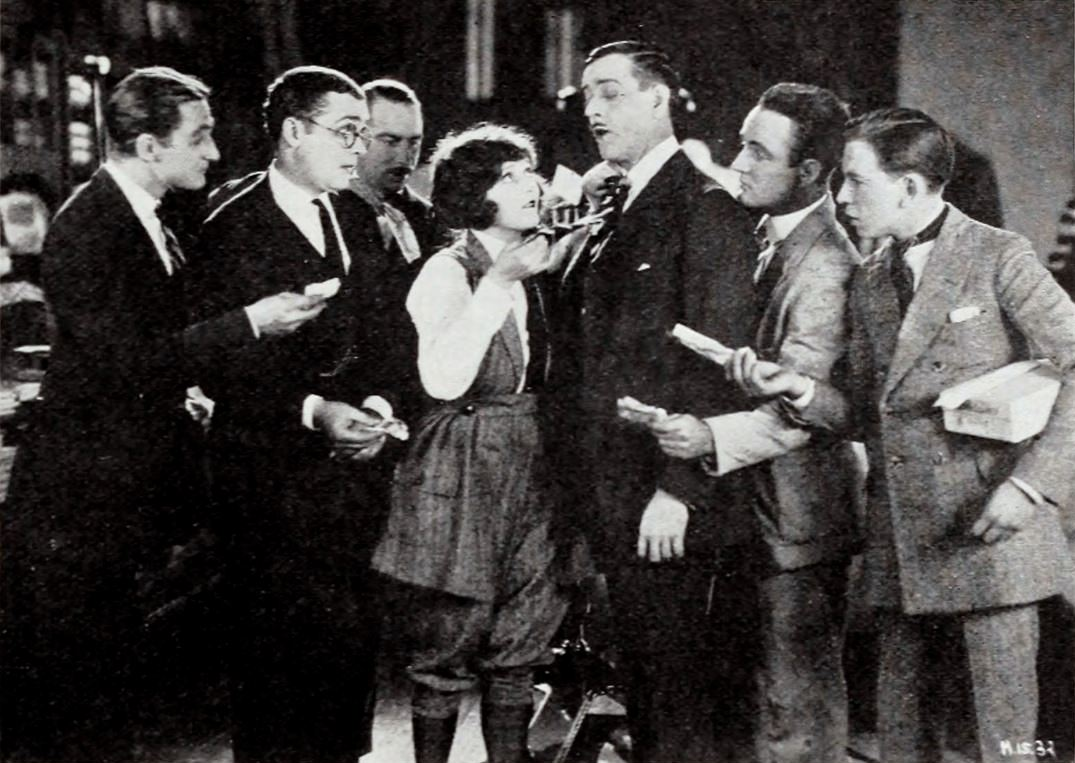
- Film still
- Directed by: William A. Seiter
- Screenplay by: Beatrice Van
- Produced by: Hunt Stromberg
- Starring: Doris May; Fred Gamble; Jean Hathaway; Frank Kingsley; Harry Myers; Otto Hoffman
- Cinematography: Bert Cann
- Production company: Hunt Stromberg Productions
- Distributed by: Robertson-Cole Distributing Corporation
- Release date: March 5, 1922
- Running time: 50 minutes
- Country: United States
- Language: Silent (English intertitles)

Boy Crazy is a 1922 American comedy film directed by William A. Seiter and written by Beatrice Van. The film stars Doris May, Fred Gamble, Jean Hathaway, Frank Kingsley, Harry Myers, and Otto Hoffman. The film was released on March 5, 1922, by the Robertson-Cole Distributing Corporation. With no copies listed as being held in any film archive, it is likely to be a lost film.

== Plot ==
As described in a film magazine, vivacious Jackie Cameron plays her Juliet to a half dozen Romeos. When the general store operated by her father is threatened with bankruptcy, she borrows $2,000 from Mr. Skinner, the town millionaire, and builds up a fine business by turning it into an up-to-date haberdashery. Across the street is a rival concern, a ladies' millin ery shop conducted by J. Smythe from Paris. Kidnappers plan to capture old Skinner's daughter Evelina, and overhear her say that she is planning on buying a dress on display by Smythe. When Jackie buys the dress, they take her by mistake and she is locked in a deserted house and held for ransom. Smythe, who has fallen in love with Jackie, comes to her rescue, and she saves him from a severe beating by dropping jugs on the heads of the criminals.

== Cast ==
- Doris May as Jackie Cameron
- Fred Gamble as Mr. Cameron
- Jean Hathaway as Mrs. Cameron
- Frank Kingsley as Tom Winton
- Harry Myers as J. Smythe
- Otto Hoffman as Mr. Skinner
- Gertrude Short as Evelina Skinner
- Eugenia Tuttle as Mrs. Winton
- Ed Brady as Kidnapper
- James Farley as Kidnapper
