= Upstairs (film) =

1919 film directed by Victor Schertzinger

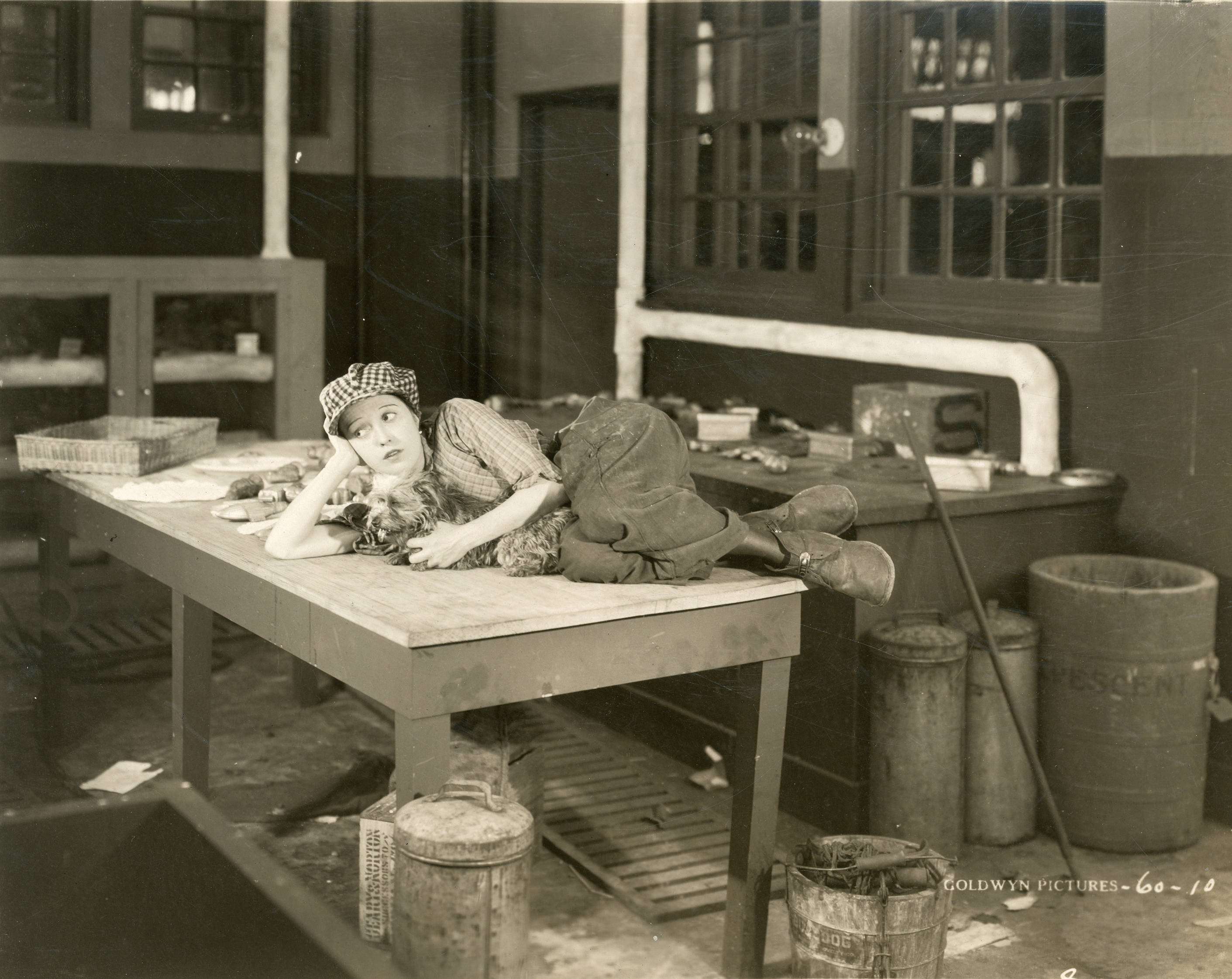
- Still with Mabel Normand
- Directed by: Victor Schertzinger
- Written by: Robert F. Hill; Perley Poore Sheehan
- Produced by: Samuel Goldwyn
- Starring: Mabel Normand; Cullen Landis; Hallam Cooley
- Cinematography: George Webber
- Production company: Goldwyn Pictures
- Distributed by: Goldwyn Distributing
- Release date: August 3, 1919
- Running time: 50 minutes
- Country: United States
- Language: SSilent (English intertitles)

Upstairs is a 1919 American silent comedy film directed by Victor Schertzinger and starring Mabel Normand, Cullen Landis, and Hallam Cooley.

== Cast ==
- Mabel Normand as Elsie MacFarland
- Cullen Landis as Lemuel Stallings
- Hallam Cooley as Harrison Perry
- Edwin Stevens as Detective Murphy
- Robert Bolder as Chef Henri
- Charles A. Post as Assistant Chef
- Colin Kenny as George
- Beatrice Burnham as Eloise Barrison
- Frederick Vroom as James Barrison
- Kate Lester as Mrs. Barrison

== Bibliography ==
- James Robert Parish & Michael R. Pitts. Film directors: a guide to their American films. Scarecrow Press, 1974.
