= Hallam Cooley =

American actor

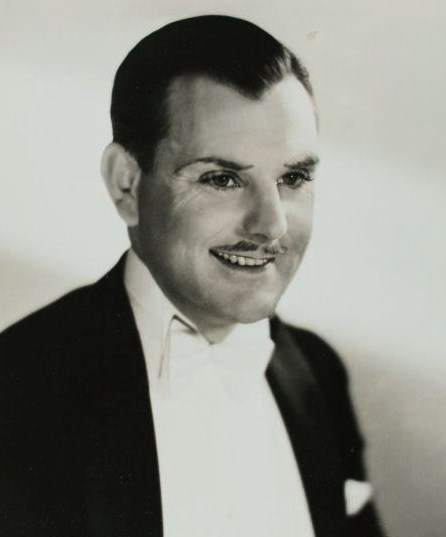
- Cooley in Holiday (1930)
- Born: February 8, 1895; Brooklyn, New York, U.S.
- Died: March 20, 1971 (aged 76); Tiburon, California, U.S
- Other name: Hal Cooley
- Occupation: Actor
- Years active: 1913–1936
- Spouses: Elizabeth Bates (m. 1919; div. 1934) Doris MacMahon (m. 1935)

Hallam Burr (February 8, 1895 – March 20, 1971), known by his stage name Hallam Cooley, was an American actor of the silent era. He appeared in more than 100 films between 1913 and 1936. He was born in Brooklyn, New York, and died in Tiburon, California.

Cooley attended Northwestern Military Academy in Highland Park, Illinois, and graduated from the University of Minnesota. He began as a stage actor and later worked for American, Ince, Selig, and Universal studios before going to Famous Players–Lasky.

Cooley married Elizabeth Bates on Christmas Day, 1919, and they divorced in July 1934. His second wife was Doris MacMahon, and they married on August 1, 1935. He claimed to be a direct descendant of Aaron Burr, the third Vice President of the United States.

== Partial filmography ==
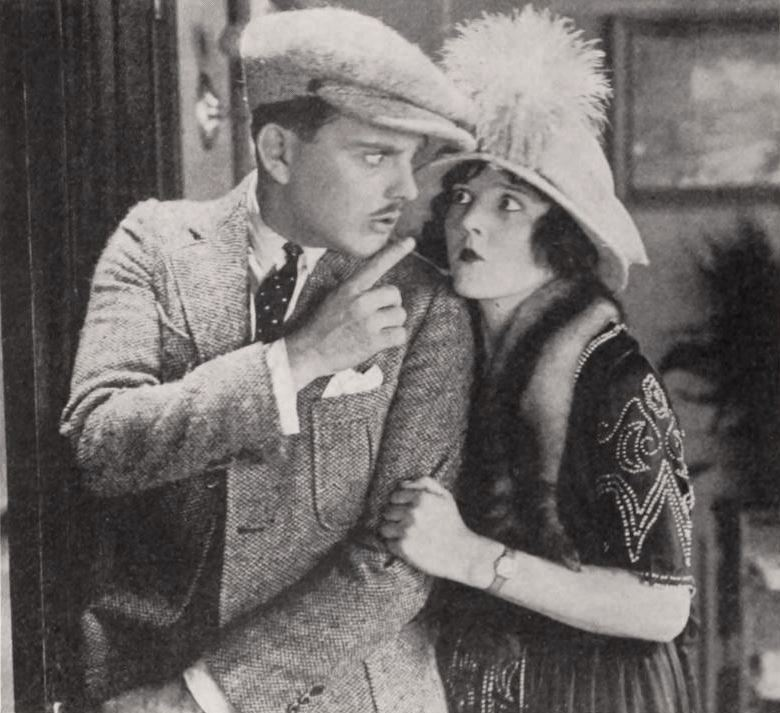
Cooley with Doris May in The Foolish Age (1921)

- Bull's Eye (1917)
- The Cricket (1917)
- The Guilty Man (1918)
- The Deciding Kiss (1918)
- The Brass Bullet (1918)
- Happy Though Married (1919)
- More Deadly Than The Male (1919)
- One of the Finest (1919)
- Upstairs (1919)
- An Old Fashioned Boy (1920)
- A Light Woman (1920)
- Trumpet Island (1920)
- Pinto (1920)
- What Do Men Want? (1921)
- The Foolish Age (1921)
- The Ten Dollar Raise (1921)
- Playing With Fire (1921)
- Beauty's Worth (1922)
- Her Night of Nights (1922)
- Up and at 'Em (1922)
- The Wise Kid (1922)
- Confidence (1922)
- Rose o' the Sea (1922)
- The Kingdom Within (1922)
- One Week of Love (1922)
- Dollar Devils (1923)
- Going Up (1923)
- Are You a Failure? (1923)
- Sporting Youth (1924)
- The White Sin (1924)
- Never Say Die (1924)
- The Monster (1925)
- Free to Love (1925)
- Stop Flirting (1925)
- The Thoroughbred (1925)
- Seven Days (1925)
- Some Pun'kins (1925)
- Forever After (1926)
- Naughty but Nice (1927)
- Her Wild Oat (1927)
- Wedding Bills (1927)
- The Home Towners (1928)
- Fancy Baggage (1929)
- Paris Bound (1929)
- Stolen Kisses (1929)
- In the Headlines (1929)
- So Long Letty (1929)
- Wedding Rings (1929)
- Tonight at Twelve (1929)
- Back Pay (1930)
- Holiday (1930)
- Soup to Nuts (1930)
- Sporting Blood (1931) as Bill Ludeking
- Frisco Jenny (1932)
