= Good Morning, Judge (1928 film) =

1928 film directed by William A. Seiter

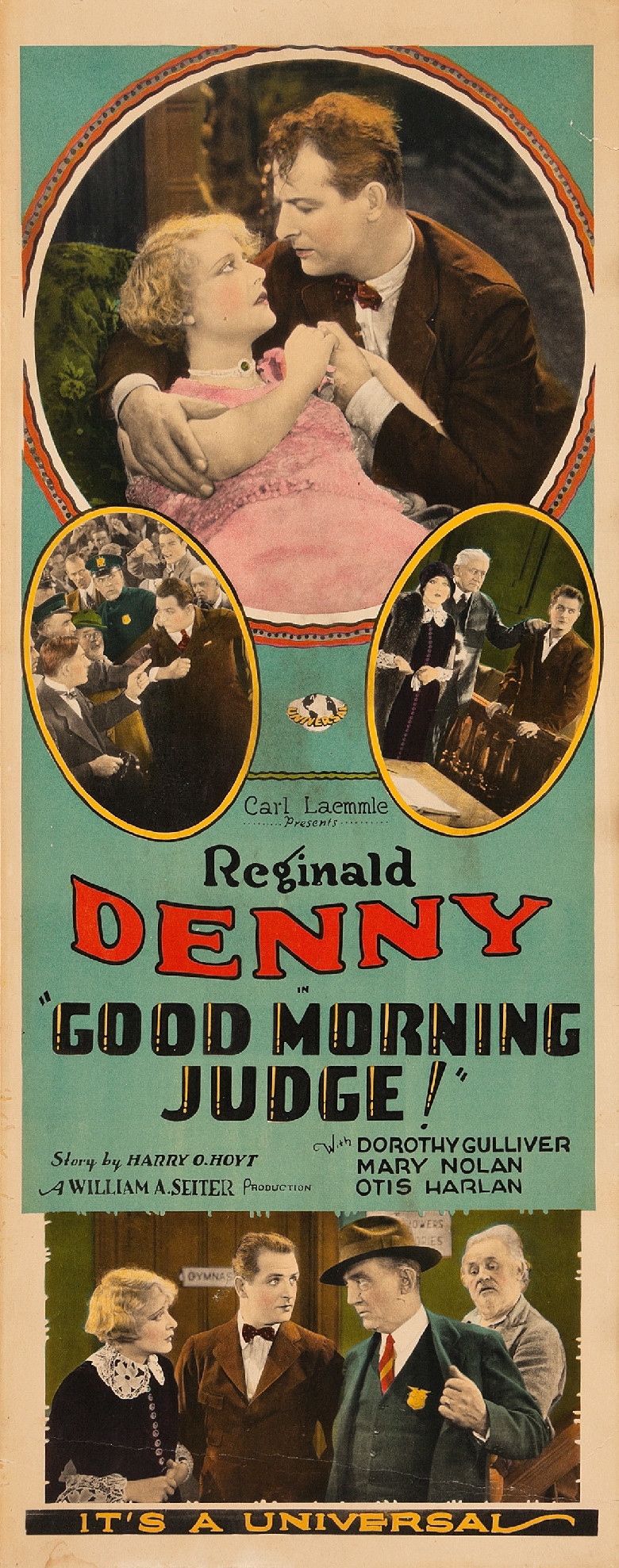
- Film poster
- Directed by: William A. Seiter
- Written by: Harry O. Hoyt; Joseph F. Poland; Tom Reed; Earle Snell; Beatrice Van
- Starring: Reginald Denny; Mary Nolan; Otis Harlan
- Cinematography: Arthur L. Todd
- Edited by: Edward M. McDermott; John Rawlins
- Production company: Universal Pictures
- Distributed by: Universal Pictures
- Release date: April 29, 1928
- Running time: 60 minutes
- Country: United States
- Language: Silent (English intertitles)

Good Morning, Judge is a 1928 American silent comedy film directed by William A. Seiter and starring Reginald Denny, Mary Nolan, and Otis Harlan. A print of Good Morning, Judge.

== Cast ==
- Reginald Denny as Freddie Grey
- Mary Nolan as Julia Harrington
- Otis Harlan as Jerry Snoot
- Dorothy Gulliver as Ruth Grey
- William B. Davidson as Elton (as William Davidson)
- Bull Montana as First Crook
- William Worthington as Mr. Grey Sr
- Sailor Sharkey as Second Crook
- Charles Coleman as Butler
- William H. Tooker as Judge

== Bibliography ==
- Munden, Kenneth White. The American Film Institute Catalog of Motion Pictures Produced in the United States, Part 1. University of California Press, 1997.
