= 23 1/2 Hours' Leave =

1919 film

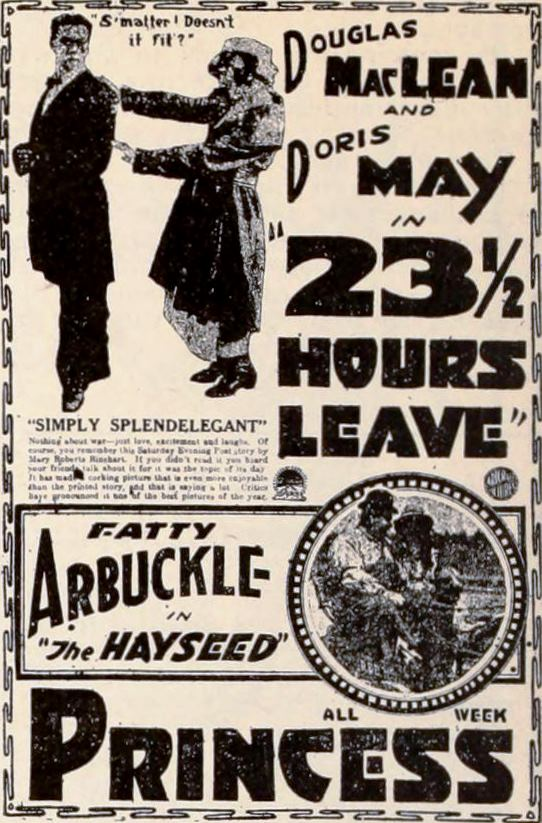
- Newspaper advertisement
- Directed by: Henry King
- Screenplay by: Mary Roberts Rinehart; Agnes Christine Johnston
- Produced by: Thomas H. Ince
- Starring: Douglas MacLean; Doris May; Tom Guise; Maxfield Stanley; Wade Boteler; Alfred Hollingsworth
- Cinematography: Bert Cann
- Production companies: Thomas H. Ince Corporation; Famous Players–Lasky Corporation
- Distributed by: Paramount Pictures
- Release date: November 16, 1919
- Running time: 50 minutes
- Country: United States
- Language: Silent (English intertitles)

23 1/2 Hours' Leave is a lost 1919 American silent comedy film directed by Henry King and written by Mary Roberts Rinehart and Agnes Christine Johnston. The film stars Douglas MacLean, Doris May, Tom Guise, Maxfield Stanley, Wade Boteler and Alfred Hollingsworth. It was released on November 16, 1919, by Paramount Pictures. In 1937, MacLean produced a remake for Grand National Pictures.

== Cast ==
- Douglas MacLean as Sergeant William Gray
- Doris May as Peggy Dodge
- Tom Guise as General Dodge
- Maxfield Stanley as Table Sergeant
- Wade Boteler as Mess Sergeant
- Alfred Hollingsworth as Booth
- N. Leinsky as A Spy
- Jack Nelson as General's Aide

== Preservation ==
With no holdings located in archives, 23 1/2 Hours' Leave is considered a lost film.
