= A Light Woman (1920 film) =

1920 film

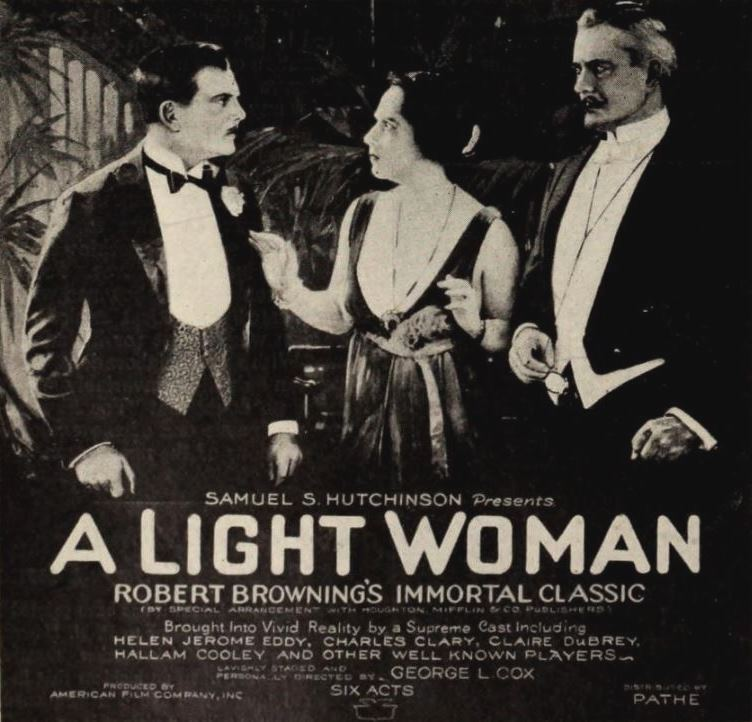
- Poster
- Directed by: George L. Cox
- Written by: Sidney Algier; George L. Cox
- Story by: Robert Browning
- Starring: Helen Jerome Eddy; Hallam Cooley; Claire Du Brey
- Production company: American Film Company
- Distributed by: Pathé Exchange
- Release date: September 1920
- Running time: 60 minutes
- Country: United States
- Language: Silent (English intertitles)

A Light Woman is a 1920 American silent drama film directed by George L. Cox and starring Helen Jerome Eddy, Hallam Cooley, and Claire Du Brey.

== Cast ==
- Helen Jerome Eddy as Doris Kane
- Hallam Cooley as Paul Evans
- Claire Du Brey as Jeanne DuPre
- Charles Clary as Thomas Evans
- Guy Milham a Hal Foster
- Frances Raymond as The Mother

== Bibliography ==
- Connelly, Robert B. The Silents: Silent Feature Films, 1910-36, Volume 40, Issue 2. December Press, 1998.
