= Take 'em and Shake 'em =

1931 film

- Directed by: Fatty Arbuckle (as William Goodrich)
- Written by: Beatrice Van
- Produced by: Lew Lipton
- Starring: June MacCloy
- Edited by: John F. Link Sr.
- Distributed by: RKO Radio Pictures
- Release date: September 28, 1931
- Running time: 18 minutes
- Country: United States
- Language: English

Take 'em and Shake 'em is a 1931 American Pre-Code comedy film directed by Fatty Arbuckle and starring June MacCloy. The film has 2 reels and is a sound short.

== Premise ==
Three girls are occupying the apartment of a rich Frenchman and have no intention to leave.

== Cast ==
- June MacCloy
- Marion Shilling
- Gertrude Short
- Charles Judels
- Arthur Hoyt

== Reception ==
The Hollywood Reporter described the short as "20 minutes of unbelievable hokum".

The Motion Picture Herald calls it "a comedy effort that contains a fair deal of slapstick."

== See also ==
- Fatty Arbuckle filmography
