= O'Malley of the Mounted =

O'Malley of the Mounted may refer to:

- O'Malley of the Mounted (1921 film), an American silent Western film
- O'Malley of the Mounted (1936 film), an American Western film
