= Gigolettes =

1932 film

- Directed by: Fatty Arbuckle (as William Goodrich)
- Written by: Beatrice Van
- Produced by: Lew Lipton
- Starring: June MacCloy
- Edited by: Fred Maguire
- Release date: May 23, 1932
- Running time: 18 minutes
- Country: United States
- Language: English

Gigolettes is a 1932 American Pre-Code comedy film directed by Fatty Arbuckle under the pseudonym "William Goodrich". The film was written by Beatrice Van and starred June MacCloy and Gertrude Short.

== Cast ==
- June MacCloy
- Marion Shilling
- Gertrude Short
- Aloha Porter

== See also ==
- Fatty Arbuckle filmography
