= Niagara Falls (1932 film) =

1932 film

- Directed by: Fatty Arbuckle (as William Goodrich)
- Written by: Ewart Adamson
- Produced by: Lew Lipton
- Starring: June MacCloy
- Edited by: Walter Thompson
- Release date: June 27, 1932
- Running time: 19 minutes
- Country: United States
- Language: English

Niagara Falls is a 1932 American Pre-Code comedy film directed by Fatty Arbuckle. It was the last film that Arbuckle directed.

== Cast ==
- June MacCloy
- Marion Shilling
- Gertrude Short
