= Sundown Trail =

1931 film

- Directed by: Robert F. Hill
- Screenplay by: Robert F. Hill
- Produced by: Fred Allen
- Starring: Tom Keene; Marion Shilling; Nick Stuart; Hooper Atchley; Stanley Blystone
- Cinematography: Ted D. McCord
- Music by: Arthur Lange
- Production company: RKO Pictures
- Distributed by: RKO Pictures
- Release date: September 11, 1931
- Running time: 56 minutes
- Country: United States
- Language: English

Sundown Trail is a 1931 American pre-Code Western film written and directed by Robert F. Hill and starring Tom Keene, Marion Shilling, Nick Stuart, Hooper Atchley and Stanley Blystone. It was released on September 11, 1931, by RKO Pictures.

Her male co-stars liked to tease Marion Shilling during down time and frequently made her blush with their risque comments. "A bit later in my life when I became more hip, I thought of some great comebacks, but as with so many marvelous afterthoughts, it was too late, alas, too late." They also laughed together about their director, who they dubbed "Bring 'Em Back Alive." "Immaculately groomed, he wore riding pants and pith helmet, and everything he said was with emphasis. His booming voice and the way he dashed about left no doubt to onlookers as to who was directing the picture," Shilling said.

The film is preserved in the Library of Congress collection.

== Cast ==
- Tom Keene as Buck Sawyer
- Marion Shilling as Dorothy 'Dottie' Beals
- Nick Stuart as Flash Prescott
- Hooper Atchley as Mr. Marston
- Stanley Blystone as Joe Currier
- Alma Chester as Ma Stoddard
- William Welsh as Pa Stoddard
- Murdock MacQuarrie as Executor of the Estate
- Louise Beavers as Auntie Jenny
