= Eddie Kane =

American actor (1889–1969)

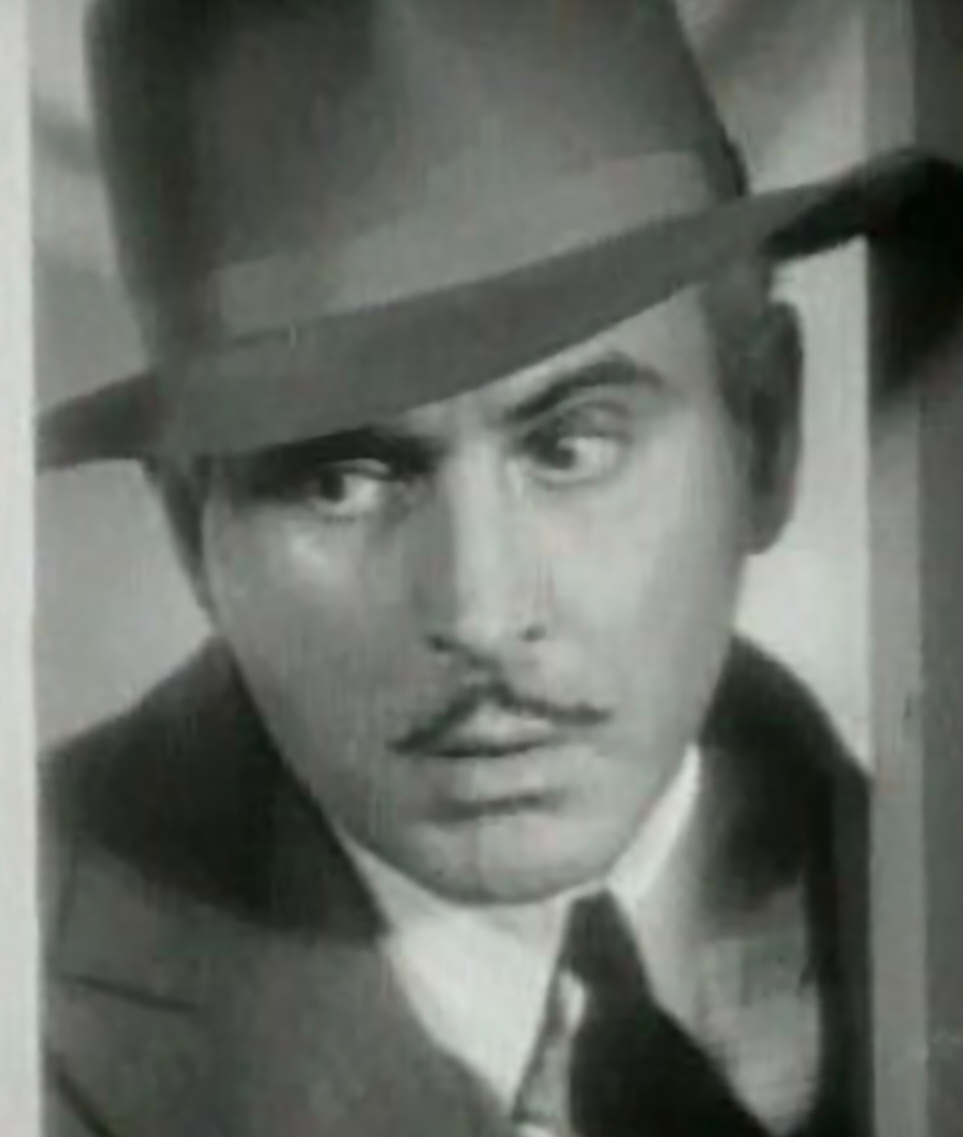
- Kane in The Stolen Jools (1931)
- Born: August 12, 1889; St. Louis, Missouri, U.S.
- Died: April 30, 1969 (aged 79); Los Angeles, California, U.S.
- Resting place: Mount Sinai Memorial Park Cemetery
- Occupation: Actor
- Years active: 1928–1959

Eddie Kane (August 12, 1889 – April 30, 1969) was an American actor who appeared in over 250 film productions from 1928 to 1959.

== Biography ==
Kane was a native of St. Louis, Missouri. His early career was in vaudeville as a member of the two-man team of Kane & Herman. Some of his more famous films include The Public Enemy (1931), The Mummy (1932), Mr. Deeds Goes to Town (1936), Mr. Smith Goes to Washington (1939), Meet John Doe (1941), Yankee Doodle Dandy (1942), It's a Wonderful Life (1946), and The Ten Commandments (1956). Kane appeared in three Academy Award for Best Picture winners: The Broadway Melody (1929), It Happened One Night (1934) and You Can't Take It with You (1938).

Late in his career, Kane made a few appearances on television including the role of Mr. Monahan, Ralph Kramden's Gotham Bus Company boss on The Honeymooners. Kane retired after the 1950s and died of a heart attack at his home in Los Angeles in 1969.

== See also ==
- List of actors with two or more Academy Awards in acting categories

== Partial filmography ==
- The Broadway Melody (1929)
- Times Square (1929)
- Song of Love (1929)
- Framed (1930)
- The Squealer (1930)
- The Slippery Pearls (1931)
- Forgotten Women (1931)
- The Public Enemy (1931)
- The County Fair (1932)
- Bachelor Mother (1932)
- The Mummy (1932)
- Western Limited (1932)
- Midnight Patrol (1932)
- The Thrill Hunter (1933)
- Secret Sinners (1933)
- The Woman Who Dared (1933) as King
- It Happened One Night (1934)
- Million Dollar Baby (1934)
- The Curtain Falls (1934)
- School for Girls (1935)
- Two for Tonight (1935)
- Mr. Deeds Goes to Town (1936)
- A Star is Born (1937)
- Topper (1937)
- Hollywood Round-Up (1937)
- The Gladiator (1938)
- Flight to Fame (1938)
- You Can't Take It with You (1938)
- Kentucky (1938)
- Mr. Smith Goes to Washington (1939)
- Star Reporter (1939)
- Music in My Heart (1940)
- Meet John Doe (1941)
- Sign of the Wolf (1941)
- Double Trouble (1941)
- Tarzan's New York Adventure (1942)
- Yankee Doodle Dandy (1942) as 2nd Critic (uncredited)
- A Man's World (1942)
- Tramp, Tramp, Tramp (1942)
- Tahiti Honey (1943)
- High Explosive (1943) as waiter (uncredited)
- Lake Placid Serenade (1944)
- Louisiana Hayride (1944) as Warburton
- The Man from Oklahoma (1945)
- Wonder Man (1945)
- The Jolson Story (1946)
- It's a Wonderful Life (1946)
- Jiggs and Maggie in Jackpot Jitters (1949)
- The Ten Commandments (1956)
