= Henrietta Crosman =

American actress (1861–1944)

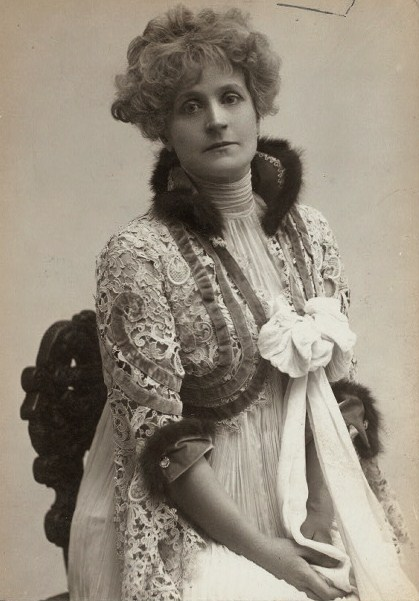
- Crosman in a publicity still from the Broadway play Madeline (1906)
- Born: Henrietta Foster Crosman; September 2, 1861; Wheeling, Virginia (now West Virginia), Confederate States
- Died: October 31, 1944 (aged 83); Pelham Manor, New York, US
- Occupation: Actress
- Years active: 1883–1940s
- Spouse(s): J. Sedley Browne (m. 1886; div. 1896) Maurice S. Campbell (m. 1896; died 1942)
- Children: 2
- Relatives: George H. Crosman (grandfather)

Henrietta Foster Crosman (September 2, 1861 – October 31, 1944) was an American stage and film actress.

== Early years ==
Crosman was born in September 2, 1861 in Wheeling, West Virginia, a few months after the start of the Civil war. Her father was George Crosman Jr., her mother was Mary B. Wick, a niece of composer Stephen Foster. and her grandfather was a Civil War Union General, George H. Crosman.

Crosman was born the year the Civil War started and moved all over the US from post to post with her army father, and so was educated in many places. On leaving school she decided to become an actress.

When she was 16, Crosman spent a year in Paris studying music with thoughts of singing grand opera. After her voice broke during a vocal lesson, she left France and thereafter turned her thoughts toward a career in theater.

== Theatrical career ==
In her early career, Crosman's career was managed by Napier Lothian Jr. She got her start in 1883 at the old Windsor Theatre, New York with the assistance of the long-time theatre manager John A. Ellsler. Her debut role was as Lilly in Bartley Campbell's The White Slave.

She later toured the country with Robert L. Downing in classic parts. In 1889 she appeared in her first Shakespeare play, As You Like It, at Augustin Daly's theater. During the course of the early 1890s she was managed by Daniel Frohman and appeared in his stock company. From 1892 to 1894 her career was managed by Daniel's brother, Charles Frohman. For a short period during 1891, and in between Frohman brothers, she was under the aegis of A. M. Palmer.

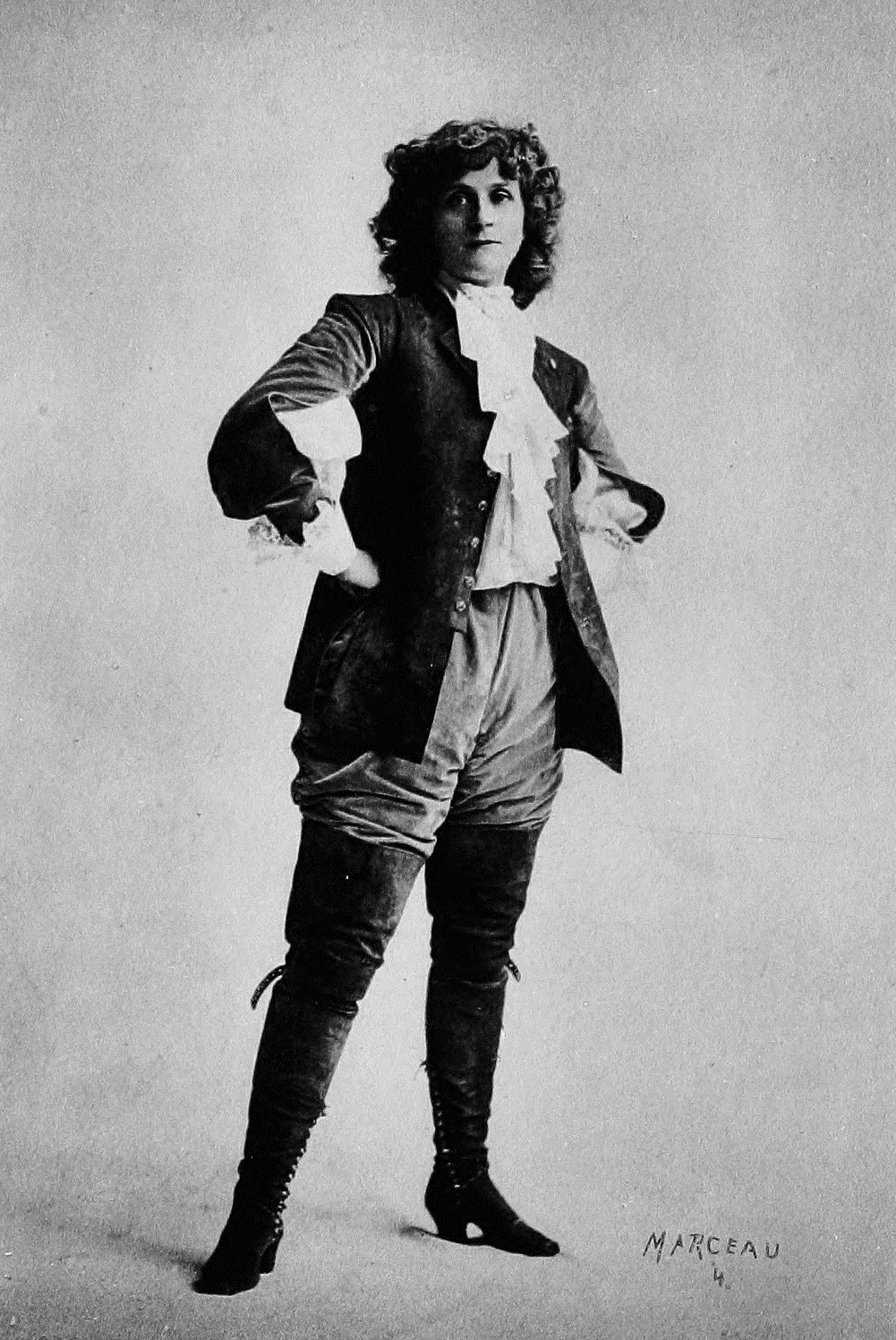
Crosman as Nell in Mistress Nell (circa 1901)

In 1899, Crosman was hired as the Leading Lady for the summer season at the Elitch Theatre in Denver, Colorado. Shows that summer included The Charity Ball, The Senator, and a production of Cyrano de Bergerac that called for 100 actors. Crosman would return to Elitch Theatre in 1903 for several pre-season performances.

By 1900 Crosman was a star and appeared for the first time as such in Mistress Nell keeping in line with the sort of costume adventures that were becoming her forte. In 1896 she had married Maurice S. Campbell, then a New York journalist from a wealthy family, and starting in 1902 Campbell produced a number of Broadway productions featuring her, starting with Evelyn Greenleaf Sutherland's "Joan O' the Shoals" in 1902. Sweet Kitty Bellairs in 1903 was particularly successful, running for 206 performances. Campbell's 1905 version of the Ibsen play When We Dead Awaken, starring Crosman, was the first and only production. In 1911, she and her company staged 60 performances of Catherine Chisholm Cushing's comedy The Real Thing at the Maxine Elliott Theatre in New York, before taking the show on the road. In early July 1912, Crosman and company were in Regina, Saskatchewan following the Regina Cyclone, and staged a benefit performance of The Real Thing for the victims. The last Campbell/Crosman production was The Tongues of Men by Edward Childs Carpenter in 1913. Several of these plays would be made as films in the silent era played by younger actresses.

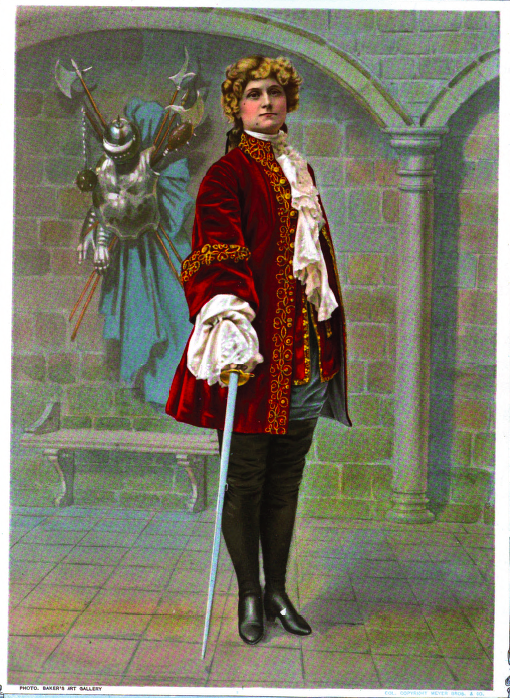
Henrietta Crosman in The Sword and the King (1902)

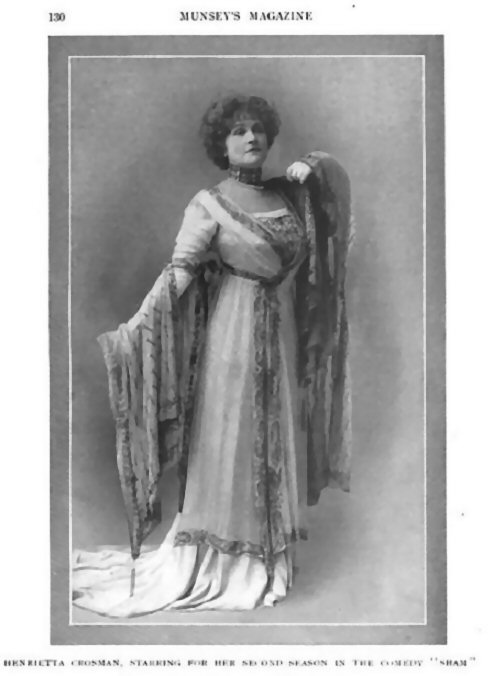
Munsey's Magazine, 1910

Now in her forties, Crosman was starting to move away from the strenuous sword-carrying, heavy costume adventures that she was popular in. Much of the remainder of her theatrical career would consist of drawing room comedies and farces, a type of playing that was less hectic for an ageing actress. However, she would return to revivals of Shakespeare, i.e. The Merry Wives of Windsor, and in Richard Brinsley Sheridan's The Rivals.

== Films ==
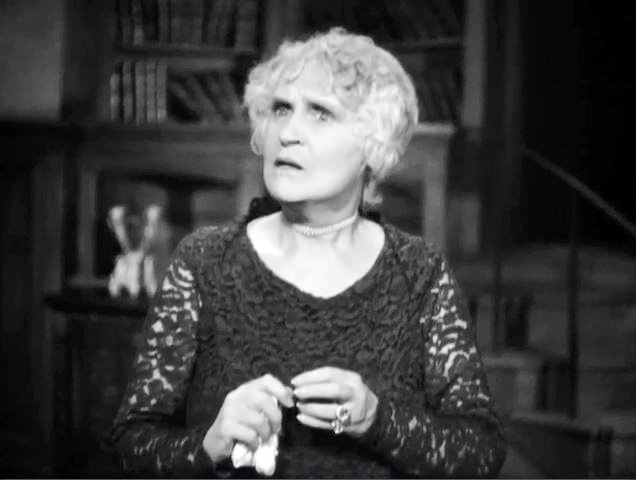
Crosman in Charlie Chan's Secret (1936)

Crosman, like many a heralded stage star, held off from motion pictures. But by 1914 and possibly out of curiosity she 'signed up', as the popular motto went at the time, for a one-picture deal with Adolph Zukor's Famous Players. It was a film version of The Unwelcome Mrs. Hatch, which as a play had been a winning success for Mrs Fiske in 1901 on Broadway. The Supreme Test followed in 1915 for Universal Studios but afterwards her silent film appearances were sporadic. Her husband Maurice Campbell joined his wife in the movie industry eventually becoming a noted director.

By 1930 silent films had given way to talking pictures and as in 1914 the motion picture business courted stage trained actors. Crosman a veteran and now approaching seventy had a career resurgence endearing herself to a new younger generation who never had the chance to see her in her youth on stage. She gave a heartbreaking performance in a rare lead film role in Pilgrimage (1933) as the embittered mother of a soldier killed in World War I who travels to the Argonne and undergoes a spiritual renewal. An earlier talkie in which she appeared was The Royal Family of Broadway (1930), a Paramount version of the play by Edna Ferber, loosely based on the Barrymore family.

== Personal life ==
In 1886, Crosman married Sedley Browne. A year later, they had a son, Sedley Browne Jr. The Brownes divorced in 1896, after which their son changed his name to George Crosman. Later in 1896, she married newspaperman Maurice Campbell, who later became a stage producer and a director of silent films. They had a son, Maurice Campbell Jr.

Crosman married and had two sons. George (born 1887), with her first husband J. Sedley Brown. Brown later married actress Carrie Clark Ward. In 1896 she married Maurice S. Campbell[15], then a journalist, and bore him a son, Maurice Jr., in 1897. The couple appear in the 1905 Edwin S. Porter directed film The Kleptomaniac in the courtroom scene.

Maurice Campbell became a Broadway producer. He and Crosman joined the nascent silent film industry; he was a noted film director in the 1920s. The marriage to Campbell, eight years her junior, was a happy one and ended with his death in 1942. Henrietta Crosman survived her husband by two years, dying in 1944, aged 83. Biographical information for Crosman is archived in the University of Pittsburgh.

== Filmography ==
Year	Title	Role	Notes
1914	The Unwelcome Mrs. Hatch	Mrs. Hatch	
1915	The Supreme Test	Violet Logan	
1915	How Molly Made Good	Herself	cameo appearance
1923	Broadway Broke	Madge Foster	
1925	Wandering Fires	Mrs. Carroll	
1930	The Royal Family of Broadway	Fanny Cavendish	
1933	Pilgrimage	Mrs. Hannah Jessop	
1934	Carolina	Mrs. Ellen Connelly	
1934	Three on a Honeymoon	'Ma' Gillespie	
1934	Such Women Are Dangerous	Aunt Sophie Travers	
1934	Among the Missing	Aunt Martha Abbott	
1934	The Curtain Falls	Sarah Crabtree - Lady Scorsby	
1934	Elinor Norton	Christine Somers	
1934	Menace	Sybil Thornton	
1935	The Right to Live	Mrs. Trent	
1935	The Dark Angel	Granny Vane	
1936	Charlie Chan's Secret	Henrietta Lowell	
1936	Hitch Hike to Heaven	Deborah Delaney	
1936	The Moon's Our Home	Lucy Van Steedan	
1936	Girl of the Ozarks	Granny Moseley	
1936	Follow Your Heart	Madame Bovard	
1936	Personal Property	Mrs. Cosgrove Dabney	
