= Beatrice Van =

American actress

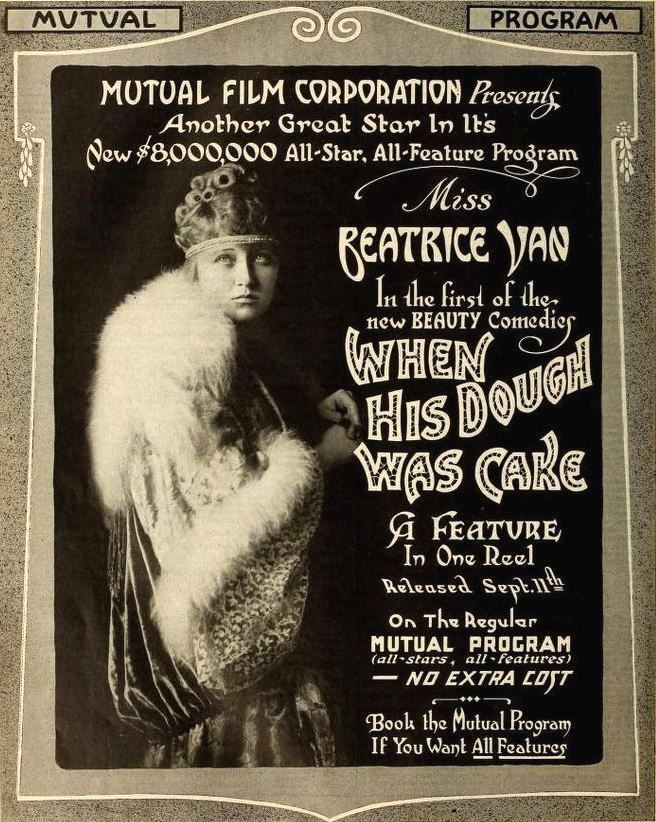
- Born: Beatrice Abbott; August 8, 1890; Omaha, Nebraska, U.S.
- Died: July 4, 1983 (aged 92); Long Beach, California, U.S.
- Occupations: Actor, screenwriter
- Spouse(s): Cornelius Vander-Pluym (divorced 1915); James Gruen (m.1927, divorced); Charles Collman
- Children: 1

Beatrice Van (born Beatrice Abbott; August 8, 1890 – July 4, 1983) was an American silent film actress. She was also a screenwriter for both silent and sound films.

== Biography ==
Beatrice was born to Joseph and Beatrice Abbott in Omaha, Nebraska; she had an older sister, Genevieve. She grew up in Nebraska and Oklahoma, where she was educated in a convent. Beatrice's first marriage was to Cornelius Vander-Pluym; they had one child together, Kreigh Vander-Pluym, in 1912. The pair eventually divorced in 1915.

She was a leading woman at Universal for a time in the 1910s, and later worked as a scenarist for FBO. Beatrice married writer-actor James Gruen in 1927, and later, an Australian national, Charles Collman.

== Filmography ==
=== Actress ===
- The Saint and the Singer (1914)
- One of the Finest (1914)
- Such a Villain (1914)
- The Hills of Silence (1914)
- The Awakening (1914/I)
- Lost by a Hair (1914)
- The Barnstormers (1914)
- This Is the Life (1914/III)
- Helping Mother (1914)
- Her Bounty (1914) as Bessie Clay
- Her Life's Story (1914) as The Wife
- The Senator's Lady (1914)
- The Vagabond (1914)
- Traffic in Babies (1914)
- Lights and Shadows (1914)
- The Heart of a Magdalene (1914)
- The Magic Mirror (1915)
- Changed Lives (1915)
- The Black Box (1915) as Ashleigh's daughter
- The Nightmare of a Movie Fan (1915)
- The Soul of the Vase (1915) as Wife
- A Woman Scorned (1915)
- Detective Blinn (1915)
- The Great Ruby Mystery (1915)
- The Mighty Hold (1915)
- The Girl from His Town (1915) as Duchess of Breakwater
- Love and Labor (1915)
- What's in a Name? (1915)
- Uncle Heck, by Heck! (1915)
- A Bully Affair (1915/I)
- When His Dough Was Cake (1915)
- A Friend in Need (1915)
- Mixed Males (1915)
- The End of the Road (1915)
- Almost a Widow (1915)
- The Wraith of Haddon Towers (1916)
- The Hills of Glory (1916)
- The First Quarrel (1916)
- Inherited Passions (1916)
- The Pearl of Paradise (1916) as Denise, his fiancée
- Told at Twilight (1917) as The Mother
- Hands Up! (1917) as Elinor Craig
- Who Was the Other Man? (1917) as Wanda Bartell
- Flirting with Death (1917)
- A Devil with the Wimmin (1917)
- My Unmarried Wife (1918)
- Painted Lips (1918) as Mrs. Silver
- There Goes the Bride (1918)
- Good Night, Paul (1918) as Rose Hartley
- The Tiger Lily (1919) as Dorothy Van Rensselaer
- The Dangerous Talent (1920) as Mildred Shedd

=== Writer ===
- A Small Town Girl (1915) (scenario)
- Miss Jackie of the Army (1917) (story)
- Molly Go Get 'Em (1918) (scenario)
- Jilted Janet (1918) (story)
- Ann's Finish (1918) (story)
- Penny of Top Hill Trail (1921)
- Eden and Return (1921)
- Boy Crazy (1922) (story)
- The Understudy (1922)
- Their First Vacation (1922) (scenario)
- Crashin' Thru (1923) (adaptation)
- The Fast Worker (1924)
- Any Woman (1925)
- California Straight Ahead (1925)
- A Knight Before Christmas (1926) (scenario)
- A Trip to Chinatown (1926)
- Along Came Auntie (1926)
- Raggedy Rose (1926)
- Blisters Under the Skin (1927) (scenario)
- Beware of Widows (1927)
- Silk Stockings (1927)
- The Irresistible Lover (1927)
- Companionate Marriage (1928)
- Thanks for the Buggy Ride (1928)
- Finders Keepers (1928)
- Good Morning, Judge (1928)
- Sinner's Parade (1928) (also adaptation)
- Modern Love (1929) (also story)
- No, No, Nanette (1930) (dialogue)
- Take the Heir (1930)
- He Loved Her Not (1931)
- Take 'em and Shake 'em (1931)
- Easy to Get (1931)
- Only Men Wanted (1932)
- Gigolettes (1932)
- Night of Terror (1933)
