= June MacCloy =

American actress and singer (1909–2005)

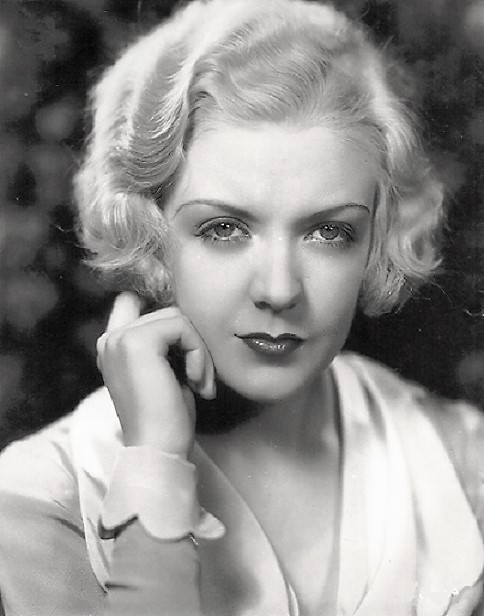
- MacCloy in 1940
- Born: June Mary MacCloy; June 2, 1909; Sturgis, Michigan, U.S.
- Died: May 5, 2005 (aged 95); Sonoma, California, U.S.
- Occupation: Actress
- Years active: 1930–1941
- Spouse(s): Wilbur Guthlein (?–1931) Shuyler Schenk (m. 1931; div. 1934) Neal Wendell Butler (m. 1941; died 1985)

June Mary MacCloy (June 2, 1909 – May 5, 2005) was an American actress and singer in the 1930s and 1940s.

== Early years ==
The daughter of Mr. and Mrs. Louis V. MacCloy, she was born in Sturgis, Michigan, on June 2, 1909, and grew up in Toledo, Ohio.

== Theater ==
In 1928 she joined Vanities, produced by Earl Carroll, but her mother forced her to quit due to her skimpy costume. When she was a teenager, MacCloy impersonated Broadway star Harry Richman, singing in George White's Scandals (1928).

Just prior to making her first movie MacCloy was working in New York City clubs such as the Abbey and Chateau Madrid. Before beginning her film career, MacCloy performed in a vaudeville production designed by Vincente Minnelli. After her film début she appeared on Broadway in Hot-Cha (1932).

== Movies ==
Signed by Paramount Pictures in 1930, she was loaned out to United Artists for her first feature, Reaching for the Moon (1931). She plays 'Kitty,' Bebe Daniels' flirtatious best friend. The director, Edmund Goulding, was casting another Fairbanks film when he heard about MacCloy and wired her to come and test. Her first Paramount film was June Moon (1931), based on the play by George S. Kaufman and Ring Lardner.

Subsequently, MacCloy appeared in a variety of shorts and some features with stars such as Jack Oakie, Frances Dee and ZaSu Pitts. With co-stars Gertrude Short and Marion Shilling, she made a series of shorts for RKO-Pathé called The Gay Girls. One of her directors was the then disgraced Fatty Arbuckle. She co-starred with Leon Errol in the second full Technicolor film Good Morning, Eve! (1934), released just after another Leon Errol short Service With a Smile (1934).

MacCloy is probably best remembered today for her last major film role as Lulubelle, the saloon girl in Go West (1940), starring the Marx Brothers.

== Singer ==
MacCloy subsequently sang with dance orchestras, including Johnny Hamp, Henry King, Jimmie Grier and Ben Pollack. In San Francisco she was featured with the Williams-Walsh Orchestra (Griff Williams and Jimmy Walsh) at the Hotel Mark Hopkins. Her band work took her to Chicago and many other cities.

== Personal life and death ==
In March 1931, MacCloy was sued for divorce in Cincinnati, Ohio by Wilbur Guthlein. MacCloy married Schuyler Schenck in 1931 and divorced him in 1933. In December 1941, she married architect and fellow jazz enthusiast Neal Wendell Butler, with whom she raised two children. They remained married until his death in 1985.

MacCloy died May 5, 2005, of natural causes in a nursing home in Sonoma, California.

== Selected filmography ==
- June Moon (1931)
- Glamour for Sale (1940)
- Go West (1940) as Lulubelle
