= Forgotten Women (1931 film) =

1931 film

- Directed by: Richard Thorpe
- Written by: Adele Buffington; Wellyn Totman
- Produced by: M.H. Hoffman; Trem Carr
- Starring: Marion Shilling; Beryl Mercer; Rex Bell
- Cinematography: Archie Stout; Charles Van Enger
- Edited by: W. Donn Hayes
- Production company: Trem Carr Pictures
- Distributed by: Monogram Pictures; Gaumont British Distributors (UK)
- Release date: November 25, 1931
- Running time: 67 minutes
- Country: United States
- Language: English

Forgotten Women is a 1931 American pre-Code drama film directed by Richard Thorpe and starring Marion Shilling, Beryl Mercer and Rex Bell. It was distributed by Monogram Pictures, one of the leading studios outside the majors.

== Plot ==
Aspiring actress Patricia Young is struggling to make a living as a Hollywood extra. Along with her newspaper reporter boyfriend Jimmy, she discovers the activities of a crooked producer. This leads to a promotion to him, but his head seems to be turned by the daughter of his newspaper's owner. Patricia is advised by fellow extra and former star Fern Madden who lives in the same boarding house.

== Cast ==
- Marion Shilling as Patricia Young
- Beryl Mercer as Fern Madden
- Rex Bell as Jimmy Burke
- Virginia Lee Corbin as Sissy Salem
- Carmelita Geraghty as Helen Turner
- Edna Murphy as Trixie de Forrester
- Edward Earle as Sleek Moran
- Jack Carlyle as Tony Dugan
- Eddie Kane as Mose Swineback
- Gordon De Main as Walrus
- William Beaudine as Director
- Thomas A. Curran as Mr. Turner
- Billy Franey as Mr. Flanagan - Ice Man
- Gordon Griffith as Movie Cameraman
- William H. O'Brien as Sleek's Butler
- Dorothy Vernon as Landlady
- Charles Williams as Jerry (stagehand)

== Bibliography ==
- Lussier, Tim. "Bare Knees" Flapper: The Life and Films of Virginia Lee Corbin. McFarland, 2018.
