= June Moon =

Play by George S. Kaufman and Ring Lardner

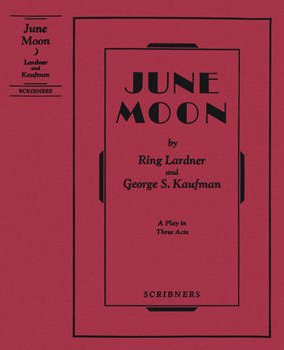
- First edition 1930
- Original language: English
- Written by: George S. Kaufman; Ring Lardner
- Subject: A young man from upstate New York seeks fame as a Tin Pan Alley lyricist
- Genre: Comedy
- Setting: New York City, 1929

Premiere
- Date: October 9, 1929
- Place: Broadhurst Theatre; New York City

June Moon is a play by George S. Kaufman and Ring Lardner. Based on the Lardner short story "Some Like Them Cold," about a love affair that loses steam before it ever gets started, it includes songs with words and music by Lardner but is not considered a musical.

== Synopsis ==
At the center of June Moon is Fred Stevens, a young aspiring lyricist who journeys from Schenectady to New York City, where he hopes to make a name for himself in the world of song publishing and night clubs. On the train, he meets dental assistant Edna Baker, and the two embark upon a friendship that evolves into love for her and fondness for him. While struggling to become a Tin Pan Alley notable, Fred takes a shine to his composer partner Paul's glamorous, gold-digging sister-in-law Eileen. The two men sell a song to a music publisher and it develops into a hit. Ultimately, revelations about Eileen's true character help return Fred to his senses and Edna, whom he realizes he truly loves.

== Productions ==
The original Broadway production opened at the Broadhurst Theatre on October 9, 1929, and ran for 273 performances. It was directed by Kaufman, and the cast included Norman Foster as Fred, Linda Watkins as Edna, Frank Otto as Paul, and Lee Patrick as Eileen.

A preview production was presented at the Belasco Theatre in Washington, D.C., on September 23, 1929.

=== Revivals ===
Milano Tilden and Carl Hunt directed a revival that opened at the Ambassador Theatre on May 15, 1933, and ran for 49 performances. The cast included Thomas Gillen as Fred, Emily Lowry as Edna, Fred Irving Lewis as Paul, and Lee Patrick reprising the role of Eileen.

Mark Nelson directed an off-Broadway revival that had a short run at the Ohio Theater in January 1997. Writing in the New York Times, Ben Brantley observed "There is indeed a discernible streak of anxiety in the comedy. It may have been written as fluff, but it's flavored with a subliminal sadness that belies its own happy ending." The production won the Lucille Lortel Award for Outstanding Revival and was nominated for the Drama Desk Award for Outstanding Revival of a Play. Actor Albert Macklin, who portrayed sardonic accompanyist Maxie, received a Best Actor Obie Award. On January 15, 1998, it reopened at the Variety Arts Theatre and ran for 101 performances. The cast included Geoffrey Nauffts as Fred, Robert Joy as Paul, and Cynthia Nixon as Eileen. Albert Macklin reprised his Obie-winning role as Maxie. Other notable actors in the cast included Billy Crudup, Hope Davis, Peter Frechette, K. Todd Freeman, Peter Gallagher, Justin Kirk, John Cameron Mitchell, Sarah Jessica Parker, Mary Beth Peil, and J. Smith-Cameron.

A production was performed at UC San Diego from February 24 to March 3, 2012, directed by Jonathan Silverstein and featuring Jack Mikesell as Fred and Vi Flaten as Edna.

Jessica Stone directed a Williamstown Theatre Festival production in July 2014.

== Adaptations ==
=== Film ===
Vincent Lawrence, Joseph L. Mankiewicz, and Keene Thompson adapted the play for a 1931 film directed by A. Edward Sutherland and produced by Paramount Pictures. The cast included Jack Oakie as Fred, Frances Dee as Edna, Ernest Wood as Paul, and June MacCloy as Eileen.

Paramount Pictures would later make another adaptation in 1937 under the name Blonde Trouble.

=== Radio ===
June Moon was adapted for the CBS Radio series The Campbell Playhouse on March 24, 1940. The cast included Orson Welles (Candy Butcher), Jack Benny (Fred Stevens), Benny Rubin (Maxie Schwartz), Gus Schilling (Paul Sears), Bea Benaderet (Lucille Sears) and Virginia Gordon (Edna Baker). Lee Patrick reprised her Broadway role as Eileen.

June Moon was presented on Philip Morris Playhouse October 3, 1941. Eddie Cantor starred in the 30-minute adaptation.

=== Television ===
On June 2, 1949, CBS Television broadcast an hour-long adaptation of June Moon on the live anthology show Studio One. The production was directed by Walter Hart, adapted by Gerald Goode, and featured Jack Lemmon as Fred Stevens, Eva Marie Saint as Edna, Edward Andrews as Paul, and Jean Carson as Eileen.

Kirk Browning and Burt Shevelove staged the play for Great Performances, airing on January 30, 1974. The cast included Tom Fitzsimmons as Fred, Barbara Dana as Edna, Jack Cassidy as Paul, Beatrice Colen as Goldie and Susan Sarandon as Eileen, with Kevin McCarthy, Lee Meredith, Estelle Parsons, Austin Pendleton, and Stephen Sondheim in supporting roles. A DVD of this production was released by Kultur Video on April 16, 2002.
