= George H. Crosman =

U.S. Army career officer

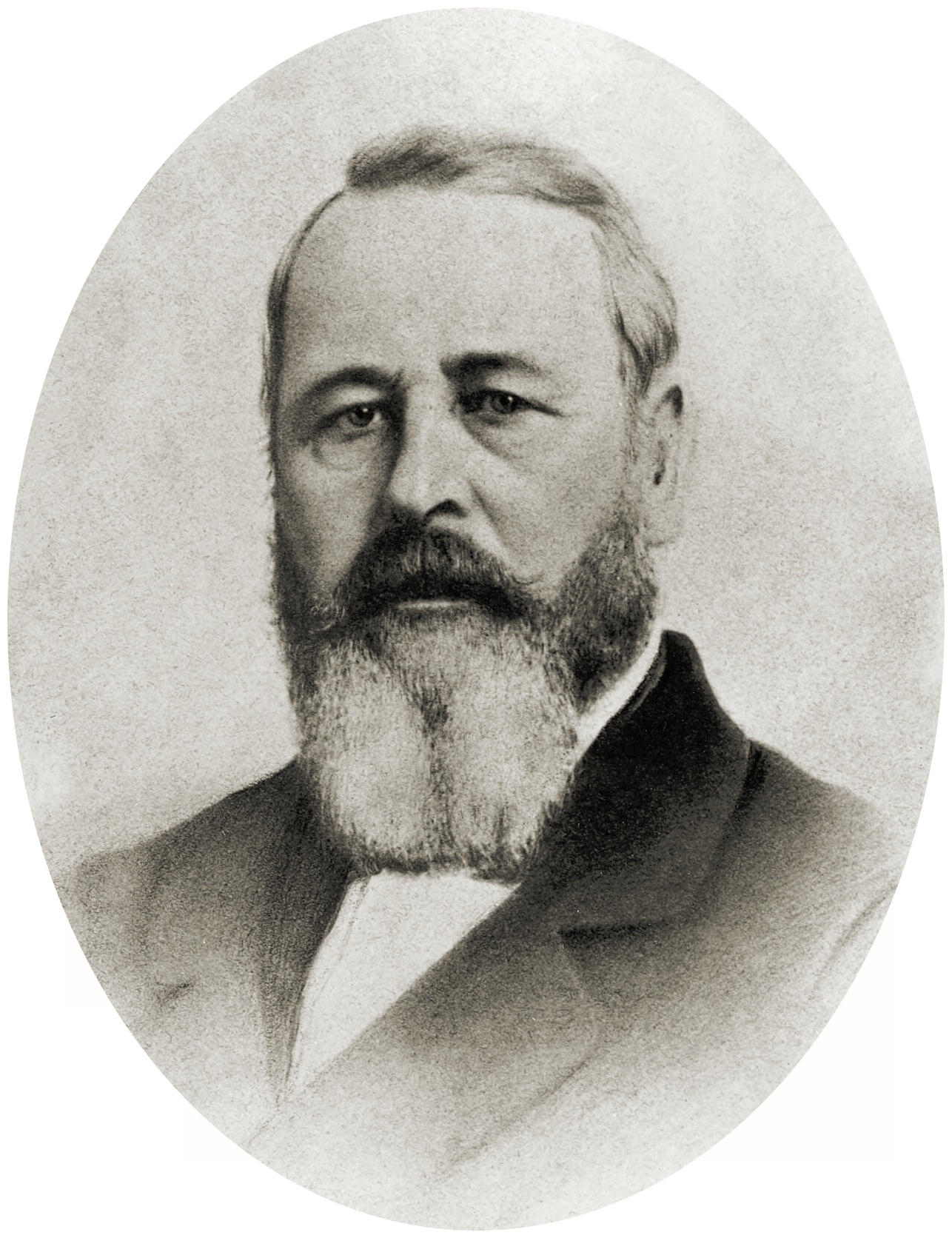
- Born: November 2, 1799; Taunton, Massachusetts
- Died: May 28, 1882 (aged 82); Philadelphia, Pennsylvania
- Burial place: The Woodlands Cemetery, Philadelphia, Pennsylvania
- Military career
- Allegiance: United States of America; Union
- Branch: United States Army; Union Army
- Service years: 1823–1866
- Rank: Colonel; Brevet Major General
- Commands: Chief Quartermaster, Department of Pennsylvania; Quartermaster, V Corps; Quartermaster, II Corps; Quartermaster, Schuylkill Arsenal
- Conflicts: Black Hawk War; Second Seminole War; Mexican–American War; Battle of Palo Alto; American Civil War

George Hampden Crosman (November 2, 1799 – May 28, 1882) was a career officer in the Regular Army of the United States who served primarily with the Quartermaster Corps.

After graduating from the United States Military Academy at West Point in 1823, Crosman served at various army posts in the Midwestern United States during the 1820s and 1830s. He was among the first army officers to propose the establishment of a U.S. Camel Corps to better transport supplies. As an officer in the Quartermaster Corps, he played a notable role in the Second Seminole War, the Mexican–American War and the American Civil War. During the Civil War, he rose to the rank of brevet major general and held a number of important posts in the Quartermaster Corps, most notably as quartermaster of the Schuylkill Arsenal in Philadelphia, the army's largest supply depot of that era.

== Early career ==
Born in Taunton, Massachusetts, in 1799 to George Crosman and Amelia Keith Crosman, George H. Crosman enrolled in the United States Military Academy at West Point in 1819. After his graduation, he was commissioned second lieutenant in the 6th United States Infantry. During the 1820s, he served at various posts on the frontier with the 6th Infantry including: Fort Mackinac, Michigan; Fort Atkinson, Nebraska; and Jefferson Barracks, Missouri. Crosman participated in General Atkinson's expedition up the Missouri River in 1825 and served in the Black Hawk War of 1832. As a line officer, he was detailed several times for various quartermaster duties, including during the Second Seminole War, until he was transferred from the Infantry to the Quartermaster Department in 1838.

Crosman was among the first officers in the U.S. Army to advocate the military use of camels for transportation of supplies. In 1836, he submitted an extensive study on the subject to his superiors, proposing a U.S. Camel Corps. Subsequently, camels were successfully used in several minor army expeditions in the desert regions of the Southwestern United States in the 1840s and 1850s. By the time of the Civil War, however, the concept of a Camel Corps had been abandoned.

During the Mexican–American War, Captain Crosman served as an assistant quartermaster. Although his duties did not typically require him to be in the line of fire, he was nonetheless awarded the brevet rank of major during the Battle of Palo Alto "for gallant and meritorious service" when the supply train of which he was in charge came under attack.

== Civil War service ==
During the 1850s, Crosman remained in the Quartermaster Corps. In the months leading up to the Civil War, he was stationed in Utah and held the rank of lieutenant colonel.

With the outbreak of the Civil War in April 1861, Crosman was appointed Chief Quartermaster of the Department of Pennsylvania. During the summer of 1861, this military department encompassed all army installations and military personnel stationed in Pennsylvania, Delaware and Maryland. In this capacity, Crosman was in charge of distributing food and supplies across three states.

After the Department of Pennsylvania was merged with the Department of the Potomac in August 1861, Crosman served as quartermaster for units in the field, most notably as quartermaster for the V Corps and later the II Corps in the spring and summer of 1862. Crosman coordinated supplies to these units, consisting of thousands of soldiers, during their involvement in the Peninsular Campaign and the Northern Virginia Campaign.

In September 1862, Crosman was transferred to Philadelphia and served as quartermaster of the Philadelphia Quartermaster Depot, also known as the Schuylkill Arsenal, which was the chief supply depot for the U.S. Department of War. Crosman served at this post for almost two years until August 1864. From September 20, 1864, to March 10, 1866, he was tasked with compiling a "Manual for the Quartermaster Department." He was promoted to colonel in the Regular Army in February 1863. On June 30, 1866, President Andrew Johnson nominated Crosman for the award of the honorary grade of brevet brigadier general, U.S.A., (Regular Army), to rank from March 13, 1865, for faithful and meritorious services during the war, and the U.S. Senate confirmed the award on July 25, 1866. On April 11, 1866, after Crosman's retirement, President Andrew Johnson nominated Crosman for the award of the honorary grade of brevet major general, U.S.A., (Regular Army), to rank from March 13, 1865, for faithful and meritorious services during the war, and the U.S. Senate confirmed the award on April 16, 1867.

== Post-war life and legacy ==
On the day following the confirmation of his award of the grade of brevet brigadier general, July 26, 1866, Crosman resigned from active service in the army. However, on August 27, 1866, he was appointed Chief Quartermaster, Department of the East. Headquartered in Philadelphia, Crosman oversaw sale of surplus military property until August, 1867. After his final retirement he lived with his wife, Hannah Blair Foster Crosman, in Philadelphia. He died on May 28, 1882, in Philadelphia. His granddaughter was the stage and film actress Henrietta Crosman.

The George H. Crosman United States Army Reserve Center in Taunton, Massachusetts, was named for him.

== See also ==
- List of Massachusetts generals in the American Civil War
- Massachusetts in the American Civil War
