= The Test (1914 film) =

1914 film

- Directed by: Wallace Reid
- Written by: Allan Dwan
- Produced by: Nestor Film Company
- Starring: Wallace Reid; Dorothy Davenport; Frank Lloyd
- Distributed by: Universal Film Manufacturing Company
- Release date: April 15, 1914
- Running time: 2 reels
- Country: USA
- Language: Silent..English titles

The Test is a 1914 silent film short directed by and starring Wallace Reid and costarring Dorothy Davenport and Frank Lloyd, later a famous director. Allan Dwan wrote the scenario. It was produced at the Nestor Film Company and released through Universal Film Manufacturing Company.

== Cast ==
- Wallace Reid – The Poor Man
- Dorothy Davenport – The Poor Man's Wife
- Frank Lloyd – The Rich Man
- Ed Brady
- Antrim Short
- Gertrude Short
- Gladys Montague
