= The Royal Family of Broadway =

1930 film

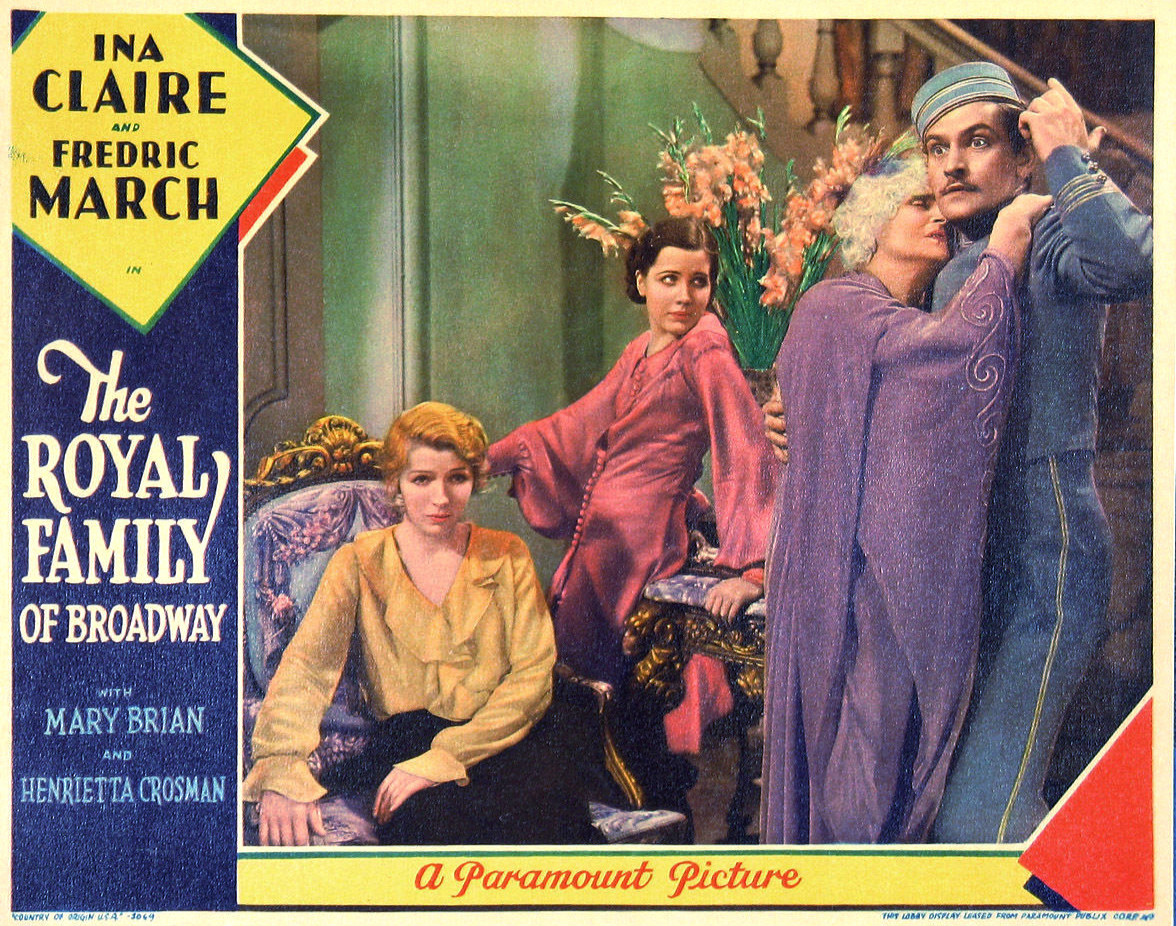
- Lobby card
- Directed by: George Cukor; Cyril Gardner
- Written by: Herman Mankiewicz; Gertrude Purcell
- Based on: The Royal Family by Edna Ferber and George S. Kaufman
- Cinematography: George J. Folsey
- Distributed by: Paramount Pictures
- Release date: December 22, 1930 (U.S.)
- Running time: 82 minutes
- Country: United States
- Language: English

The Royal Family of Broadway is a 1930 American pre-Code comedy film directed by George Cukor and Cyril Gardner and released by Paramount Pictures. The screenplay was adapted by Herman J. Mankiewicz and Gertrude Purcell from the 1927 play The Royal Family by Edna Ferber and George S. Kaufman. It stars Ina Claire, Fredric March, Mary Brian, Henrietta Crosman, Arnold Korff, and Frank Conroy. It was shot at the Astoria Studios in New York. As a film published in 1930, it entered the public domain on January 1, 2026.

== Plot ==
The full film.

The film tells the story of a girl from a family of great Broadway actors who contemplates leaving show business and getting married. The characters are a parody of the American Barrymore-Drew theatrical family.

== Cast ==
- Ina Claire as Julie Cavendish
- Fredric March as Tony Cavendish
- Mary Brian as Gwen Cavendish
- Henrietta Crosman as Fanny Cavendish
- Charles Starrett as Perry
- Arnold Korff as Oscar Wolfe
- Frank Conroy as Gilmore Marshall
- Royal C. Stout as Joe
- Elsie Esmond as Della
- Murray Alper as McDermott
- Herschel Mayall as Doctor
- Lucile Watson as Actress Backstage (uncredited)

== Recognition ==
It was nominated for the Academy Award for Best Actor (Fredric March).

== Legacy ==
A 35mm nitrate print of The Royal Family of Broadway was preserved at the UCLA Film and Television Archive in 1985. The film has not been released on DVD or Blu-Ray. Copyright is held by Universal / MCA.
