= Elinor Norton =

1934 film by Hamilton MacFadden

- Directed by: Hamilton MacFadden
- Screenplay by: Rose Franken; Philip Klein
- Based on: The State versus Elinor Norton by Mary Roberts Rinehart
- Produced by: Sol M. Wurtzel
- Starring: Claire Trevor; Gilbert Roland; Henrietta Crosman; Hugh Williams; Norman Foster
- Cinematography: George Schneiderman
- Edited by: Paul Weatherwax
- Music by: Samuel Kaylin
- Production company: Fox Film Corporation
- Distributed by: Fox Film Corporation
- Release date: November 2, 1934
- Running time: 71 minutes
- Country: United States
- Language: English

Elinor Norton is a 1934 American drama film directed by Hamilton MacFadden and written by Rose Franken and Philip Klein. It is based on the 1933 novel, The State versus Elinor Norton by Mary Roberts Rinehart. The film stars Claire Trevor, Gilbert Roland, Henrietta Crosman, Hugh Williams and Norman Foster. The film was released on November 2, 1934, by Fox Film Corporation.

== Plot ==
While Elinor Norton's jealous husband Tony is away serving in trenches in World War I, she encounters the charming Brazilian Rene Alba who falls in love with her. When Tony returns from the war slightly shell-shocked she agrees to go away with him and live on a Texas ranch while he recovers, cutting off all contact with Rene. However he comes to visit the ranch, and Tony enjoys his company and invites him to stay and even wants him to become a partner in the ranch. Eventually when he discovers the secret love between them, a neurotic Tony points a gun at his head and accidentally wounds Elinor in the shoulder.

== Cast ==
- Claire Trevor as Elinor Norton
- Gilbert Roland as Rene Alba
- Henrietta Crosman as Christine Somers
- Hugh Williams as Tony Norton
- Norman Foster as Bill Carroll
- Andrea Leeds as Nurse
- Cora Sue Collins as Betty, Little Girl
- Landers Stevens as Conductor
- Nora Lane as Publisher's Staff
- Renee Whitney as Publisher's Staff
- Lucile Browne as Publisher's Staff
- Jean Fenwick as Publisher's Staff
- Marion Shilling as Publisher's Staff
- Polly Ann Young asPublisher's Staff
- Grace Goodall as Publisher's Staff
- Caryl Lincoln as Publisher's Staff
- Susan Fleming as Publisher's Staff
- Edwin Maxwell asArmy Doctor
- Joe Rickson as Ranch Hand
- Theodore von Eltz as Army Officer
- George Humbert as Ice Cream Vendor
- Richard Tucker as Civilian Doctor
