= The County Fair (1932 film) =

1932 film by Louis King

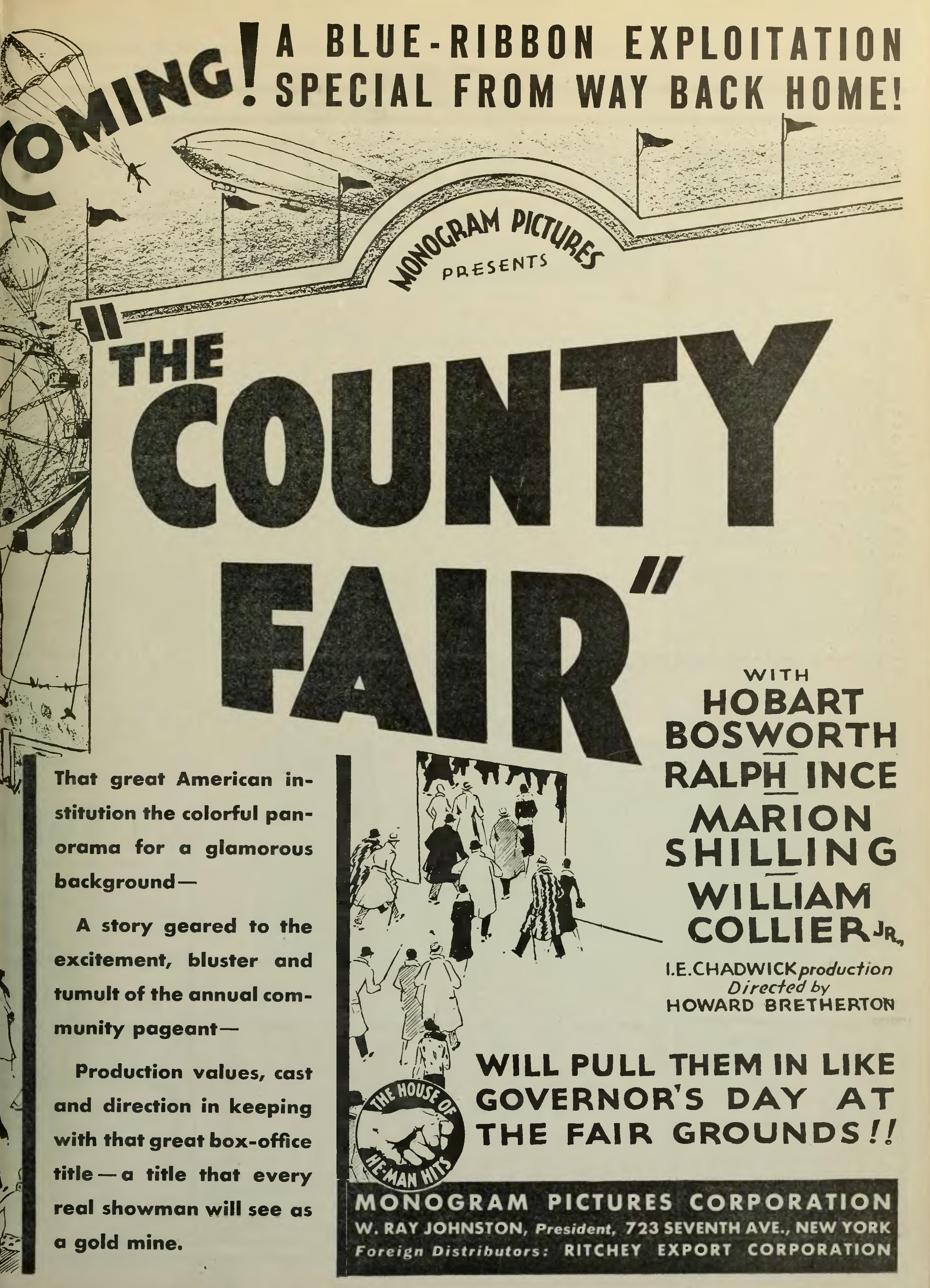
- Directed by: Louis King
- Written by: Roy Fitzroy; Harvey Gates
- Produced by: Trem Carr
- Starring: Hobart Bosworth; Marion Shilling; Ralph Ince; William Collier Jr.
- Cinematography: Archie Stout
- Production company: Monogram Pictures
- Distributed by: Monogram Pictures
- Release date: April 1, 1932
- Running time: 71 minutes
- Country: United States
- Language: English

The County Fair is a 1932 American pre-Code drama film directed by Louis King and starring Hobart Bosworth, Marion Shilling and Ralph Ince.

== Plot ==
A Kentucky Colonel and a former jockey manage to defeat a gang of criminals who hope to rig a horse race.

== Cast ==
- Hobart Bosworth as Col. Ainsworth
- Marion Shilling as Alice Ainsworth
- Ralph Ince as Diamond Barnett
- William Collier Jr. as Jimmie Dolan
- Fred 'Snowflake' Toones as Curfew
- George Chesebro as Gunner
- Otto Hoffman as Specs Matthews
- Arthur Millett as Hank Bradley
- Eddie Kane as Fisher

== Remakes ==
The film was remade twice, on both occasions by the same studio Monogram:

- County Fair (1937)
- County Fair (1950)

== See also ==
- List of films about horses
- List of films about horse racing

== Bibliography ==
- Langman, Larry & Ebner, David. Hollywood's Image of the South: A Century of Southern Films. Greenwood Publishing, 2001.
