= June Moon (film) =

1931 film by A. Edward Sutherland

- Lobby card
- Directed by: A. Edward Sutherland
- Screenplay by: Vincent Lawrence; Joseph L. Mankiewicz; Keene Thompson
- Based on: June Moon by George S. Kaufman and Ring Lardner
- Starring: Jack Oakie; Frances Dee; Wynne Gibson; Harry Akst; June MacCloy
- Cinematography: Allen G. Siegler
- Production company: Paramount Pictures
- Distributed by: Paramount Pictures
- Release date: March 21, 1931
- Running time: 79 minutes
- Country: United States
- Language: English

June Moon is a 1931 American Pre-Code comedy film based upon the play of the same name by George S. Kaufman and Ring Lardner. It was adapted by Vincent Lawrence, Joseph L. Mankiewicz and Keene Thompson and directed by A. Edward Sutherland. It stars Jack Oakie, Frances Dee, Wynne Gibson, Harry Akst and June MacCloy. The film was released on March 21, 1931, by Paramount Pictures.

== Plot ==
Aspiring lyricist Fred Stevens leaves Schenectady for New York City, with hopes of making it big in the cult business.

== Cast ==
- Jack Oakie as Frederick Martin Stevens
- Frances Dee as Edna Baker
- Wynne Gibson as Lucille Sears
- Harry Akst as Maxie Schwartz
- June MacCloy as Eileen Fletcher
- Ernest Wood as Paul Sears
- Harold Waldridge as Young Goebel
- Sam Hardy as Sam Hart
- Ethel Kenyon as Goldie
- Frank Darien as Window Cleaner
- Jean Laverty as Miss Rixey
- Eddie Dunn as Joe McCloskey
