= The Westerner (1934 film) =

1934 film by David Selman

- Directed by: David Selman
- Screenplay by: Harold Shumate
- Based on: Burnt Ranch; 1933 story in Street and Smith's Western Story Magazine by Walt Coburn
- Produced by: Irving Briskin
- Starring: Tim McCoy; Marion Shilling
- Cinematography: George Meehan
- Edited by: Ray Snyder
- Color process: Black and white
- Production company: Columbia Pictures
- Distributed by: Columbia Pictures
- Release date: December 10, 1934
- Running time: 58 minutes
- Country: United States
- Language: English

The Westerner is a 1934 American Western film directed by David Selman and starring Tim McCoy, Marion Shilling and Joe Sawyer. It was released by Columbia Pictures.

Michael R. Pitts generally praised the film, noting a "well staged" mock execution, while criticising its complex plot.

== Cast ==
- Tim McCoy as Tim Addison
- Marion Shilling as Justina Barnes
- Joe Sawyer as Bob Lockhart (as Joseph Sauers)
- Hooper Atchleyas Wayne Wallace
- John Dilson as Senator Lockhart (as John H. Dilson)
- Edward LeSaint as Zach Addison (as Edward Le Saint)
- Harry Todd as Uncle Ben
- Edmund Cobb as Joe Allen (as Eddie Cobb)
- Albert J. Smith as Sheriff
- Paul Fix as Rustler Who Confesses
