= Sinner's Parade =

1928 film

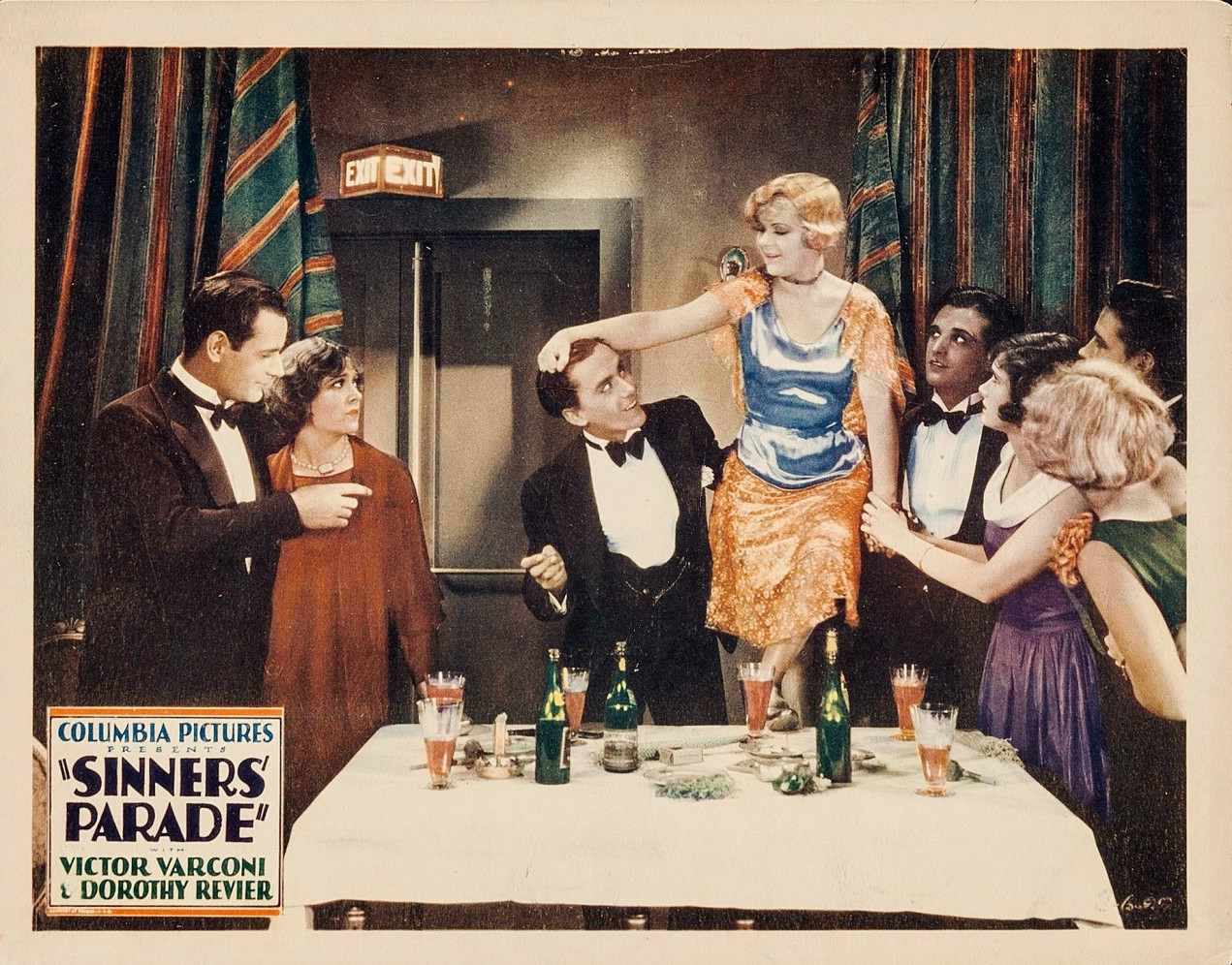
- Lobby card
- Directed by: John G. Adolfi
- Written by: Beatrice Van
- Story by: David Lewis
- Produced by: Harry Cohn
- Starring: Victor Varconi; Dorothy Revier; John Patrick
- Cinematography: James Van Trees
- Edited by: Ben Pivar
- Production company: Columbia Pictures
- Distributed by: Columbia Pictures
- Release date: September 14, 1928
- Running time: 58 minutes
- Country: United States
- Language: Silent (English intertitles)

Sinner's Parade is a 1928 American silent crime film directed by John G. Adolfi, written by Beatrice Van, and starring Victor Varconi, Dorothy Revier, and John Patrick.

The film's sets were designed by the art director Harrison Wiley.

== Cast ==
- Victor Varconi as Al Morton
- Dorothy Revier as Mary Tracy
- John Patrick as Bill Adams
- Edna Marion as Connie Adams
- Marjorie Bonner as Sadie
- Clarissa Selwynne as Mrs. Adams
- Jack Mower as Chauffeur

== Censorship ==
When Sinner's Parade was released, many states and cities in the United States had censor boards that could require cuts or other eliminations before the film could be shown. Among the cuts ordered by the Kansas censor board was an intertitle stating, "We're being raided–get rid of your liquor."

== Preservation ==
With no prints of Sinner's Parade located in any film archives, it is a lost film.

== Bibliography ==
- Larry Langman & Daniel Finn. A Guide to American Silent Crime Films. Greenwood Press, 1994.
