= Antrim Short =

American actor (1900–1972)

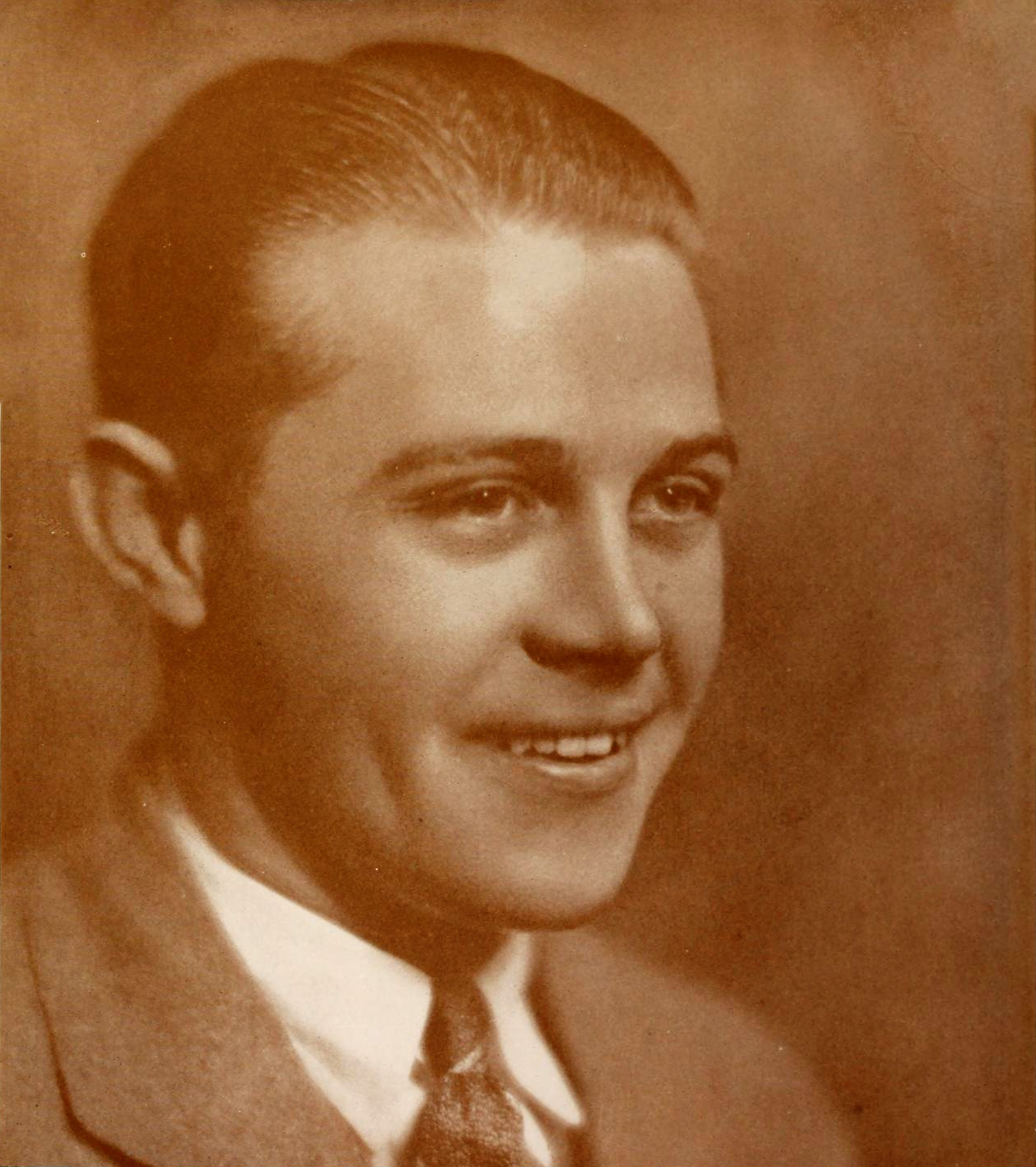
- Short in 1926
- Born: Mark Antrim Short; July 11, 1900
- Died: November 24, 1972 (age 72); Los Angeles, California
- Occupations: actor, performer
- Spouse: Frances Morris
- Family: Gertrude Short (sister); Blanche Sweet (cousin)

Mark Antrim Short (July 11, 1900 – November 24, 1972) was an American stage and film actor, casting director and talent agent.

Short was born on July 11, 1900, in Cincinnati, Ohio.

Short first acted in films when he was 6 years old. As a juvenile he enjoyed some success on the Broadway stage, notably appearing as a boy with Mrs. Fiske and Holbrook Blinn in Salvation Nell (1908) by Edward Sheldon. While in his teens he appeared in silent films playing the kind of roles that were made popular by Jack Pickford. He returned to Broadway in Carnival (1929).

Short was born to two actors, Lew and Estella Short, and his sister was silent actresses Gertrude Short. They were cousins of Blanche Sweet. Short was married to Frances Morris, who is best remembered by TV fans as George Reeves's Earth mother Sarah Kent in The Adventures of Superman.

Short became an agent for other actors in 1947.

Short died at the Motion Picture and Television Country Hospital, Calabasas, in Los Angeles on November 24, 1972, aged 72.

== Partial filmography ==
- The School Teacher and the Waif (1912) *short
- Bobby's Baby (1913) *short
- Why Rags Left Home (1913) *short
- The Fallen Angel (1913) *short
- The Village Blacksmith (1913) *short
- His Brand (1913) *short
- Chivalry Days (1913) *short
- The Kid (1913) *short
- The Buccaneers (1913) *short
- John Barleycorn (1914) *short
- Some Boy (1914) *short
- The Test (1914) *short
- The Fruit of Evil (1914) *short
- Jess of the Mountain Country (1914)
- Where the Trail Divides (1914)
- Jack Chanty (1915)
- The Old Tutor (1915) *short
- The Weird Nemesis (1915) *short
- The Cry of the First Born (1915) *short
- The Gambler of the West (1915)
- Mammy's Rose (1916) *short
- Dolly's Scoop (1916) *short
- Life's Harmony (1916) *short
- The Windward Anchor (1916) *short
- The Flirt (1916) *short
- There Is No Place Like Home (1916)
- Nancy's Birthright (1916)
- Corporal Billy's Comeback (1916) *short
- The Valley of Beautiful Things (1917) *short
- The Boyhood He Forgot (1917) *short
- Tom Sawyer (1917)
- A Jewel in Pawn (1917)
- Pride and the Man (1917)
- Rebecca of Sunnybrook Farm (1917)
- A Petticoat Pilot (1918)
- Cupid by Proxy (1918)
- Huck and Tom (1918)
- The Yellow Dog (1918)
- The Narrow Path (1918)
- Amarilly of Clothes-Line Alley (1918)
- Hugon, The Mighty (1918)
- Romance and Arabella (1919)
- Destiny (1919)
- The Thunderbolt (1919)
- Please Get Married (1919)
- The Right of Way (1920)
- Fighting Cressy (1920)
- Old Lady 31 (1920)
- The Son of Wallingford (1921)
- Rich Girl, Poor Girl (1921)
- O'Malley of the Mounted (1921)
- Beauty's Worth (1922)
- Classmates (1924)
- Wildfire (1925)
- The Pinch Hitter (1925)
- Married ? (1926)
- The Broadway Boob (1926)
- Jack O'Hearts (1926)
- The Big Shakedown (1934) *(uncredited)
- Wings in the Dark (1935) *(uncredited)
- College Scandal (1935)
- Redheads on Parade (1935) *(uncredited)
- She Couldn't Take It (1935) *(uncredited)
- The Milky Way (1936) *(uncredited)
- Mr. Deeds Goes to Town (1936) *(uncredited)
- The Moon's Our Home (1936) *(uncredited)
- The Case Against Mrs. Ames (1936) *(uncredited)
- Rose Bowl (1936) *(uncredited)
- The Big Show (1936)
- The Devil is Driving (1937) *(uncredited)
- Exclusive (1937)
- It's All Yours (1937) *(uncredited)
- Artists & Models (1937) *(uncredited)
- Ebb Tide (1937) *(uncredited)
