= The Curtain Falls (1934 film) =

1934 film by Charles Lamont

- Directed by: Charles Lamont
- Written by: Karl Brown
- Produced by: George R. Batcheller
- Starring: Henrietta Crosman; Natalie Moorhead
- Cinematography: Milford Arthur Andersen
- Distributed by: Chesterfield Pictures
- Release date: October 2, 1934
- Running time: 68 minutes
- Country: United States
- Language: English

The Curtain Falls is a 1934 drama film directed by Charles Lamont and starring Henrietta Crosman as an elderly actress on the brink of retirement. This film was made and released by the Poverty Row motion picture studio Chesterfield Pictures and was filmed at RKO Studios in Hollywood. Karl Brown wrote the story and screenplay.

Crosman plays an actress called Sarah Crabtree, an obvious amalgamation of the names of Victorian era stage stars Sarah Bernhardt and Lotta Crabtree.

A rare film, it is now released on the Alpha DVD.

== Cast ==
- Henrietta Crosman as Sarah Crabtree
- Dorothy Lee as Dot Scorsby
- Holmes Herbert as John Scorsby
- Natalie Moorhead as Katherine Scorsby
- John Darrow as Allan Scorsby
- William Bakewell as Barry Graham
- Jameson Thomas as Martin Deveridge
- Dorothy Revier as Helena Deveridge
- Eddie Kane as Taggart
- Aggie Herring as Mrs. McGillicuddy
- Tom Ricketts as Hotel Manager
- Bryant Washburn as Doctor

uncredited

- Lloyd Ingraham as Banker
- Al Bridge as Mover
- Robert Frazer as McArthur
- Bess Flowers
- Edward LeSaint
- Lafe McKee
