= Shop Angel =

1932 film

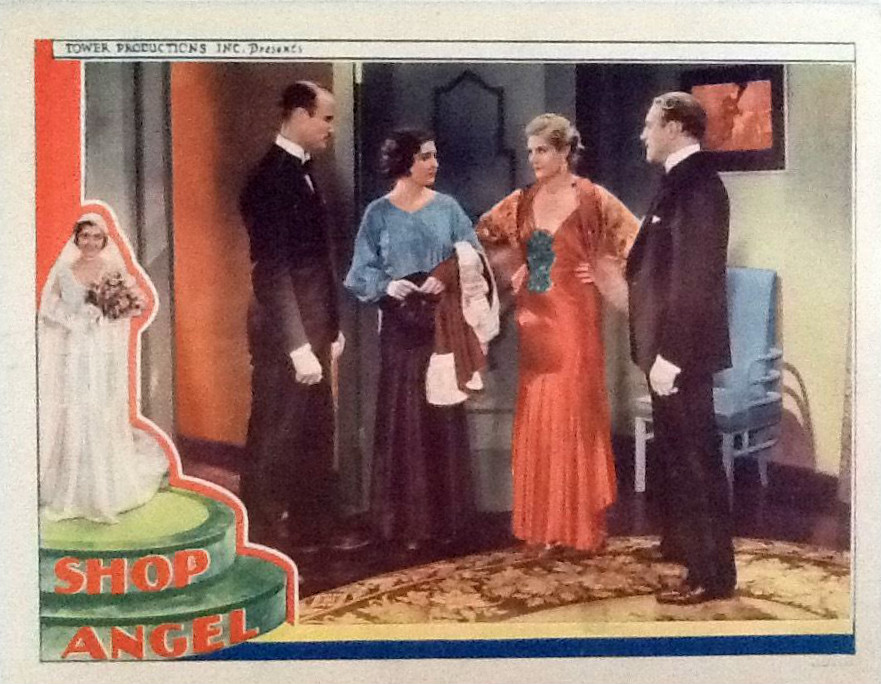
- Colorized lobby card, 1932
- Directed by: E. Mason Hopper
- Written by: Izola Forrester; Edward T. Lowe Jr.
- Produced by: Morris R. Schlank; Sigmund Neufeld
- Starring: Marion Shilling; Holmes Herbert; Anthony Bushell
- Cinematography: William Hyer
- Edited by: Louis Sackin
- Production company: Tower Productions
- Distributed by: Capitol Film Exchange
- Release date: March 6, 1932
- Running time: 71 minutes
- Country: United States
- Language: English

Shop Angel is a 1932 American pre-Code drama film directed by E. Mason Hopper and starring Marion Shilling, Holmes Herbert and Anthony Bushell.

== Cast ==
- Marion Shilling as Dorothy Hayes
- Holmes Herbert as James Walton Kennedy
- Anthony Bushell as Larry Pemberton
- Walter Byron as Don Irwin
- Dorothy Christy as Margot Kennedy
- Creighton Hale as Maxie Morton
- Hank Mann as Mr. Weinberg
- Nan Preston as French Maid

== Bibliography ==
- Clifford McCarty. Film Composers in America: A Filmography, 1911-1970. Oxford University Press, 2000.
