= Pilgrimage (1933 film) =

1933 film directed by John Ford

- Film poster
- Directed by: John Ford
- Written by: Barry Conners; Henry Johnson; Philip Klein; Dudley Nichols; Basil Woon; I.A.R. Wylie
- Starring: Henrietta Crosman
- Cinematography: George Schneiderman
- Edited by: Louis R. Loeffler
- Distributed by: Fox Film Corporation
- Release date: August 18, 1933
- Running time: 96 minutes
- Country: United States
- Language: English

Pilgrimage is a 1933 American pre-Code drama film directed by John Ford. Based on a short story by I.A.R. Wylie, the film stars Henrietta Crosman as an Arkansas mother who arranges for her son to be enlisted in the Army during the Great War to prevent him from marrying the woman he loves.

The film's title refers to trips that the American Gold Star Mothers organization arranged beginning in the late 1920s, enabling mothers and widows of fallen soldiers to visit the overseas grave sites of their loved ones.

Though it received positive reviews upon its release, Pilgrimage was a box office disappointment for Fox.

== Cast ==
- Henrietta Crosman as Mrs. Hannah Jessop
- Heather Angel as Suzanne
- Norman Foster as Jim 'Jimmy' Jessop (Hannah's son)
- Lucille La Verne as Mrs. Kelly Hatfield
- Maurice Murphy as Gary Worth
- Marian Nixon as Mary Saunders
- Jay Ward as Jimmy Saunders (Mary and Jimmy Hessop's son)
- Robert Warwick as Major Albertson
- Louise Carter as Mrs. Rogers
- Betty Blythe as Janet Prescot
- Francis Ford as Mayor Elmer Briggs
- Charley Grapewin as Dad Saunders
- Hedda Hopper as Mrs. Worth (Gary Worth's mother)
- Frances Rich as The Nurse
- Shirley Palmer as Nurse
