= Marion Shilling =

American actress (1910–2001)

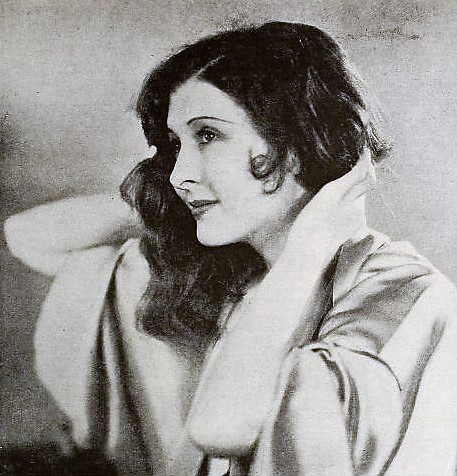
- Shilling in 1931
- Born: Marion Helen Schilling; December 3, 1910; Denver, Colorado, U.S.
- Died: November 6, 2004 (aged 93); Torrance, California, U.S.
- Education: Central High School
- Occupation: Actress
- Years active: 1928–1936
- Spouse: Edward Cook (m. 1937; died 1998)
- Children: 2

Marion Helen Schilling (December 3, 1910 – November 6, 2004) was an American stage and film actress. She was one of the most famous "B" leading ladies of the 1930s.

== Biography ==
Marion Helen Schilling was born in Denver, Colorado in 1910.

Her family moved to St. Louis when she was young. She graduated from Central High School there in 1928. She started her acting career as a stage actress, starring in stage plays such as Miss Lulu Betts and Mrs. Wiggs of the Cabbage Patch. While playing in Dracula on stage with Bela Lugosi, she developed a blood-curdling scream so effective, when she was working in Hollywood, she was asked to dub screams for Constance Bennett and Shilling's idol Pola Negri. In 1929 she received her first screen role in Wise Girls. Shilling had good memories of her director E. Mason Hopper when interviewed in the 90's. "I can still remember some of his early suggestions. 'Keep your head above the tide.' 'Be on your toes.' 'Hold your head high.' 'Act like the queen of the studio.' Those were wonderful words to a new, green girl numbed by all that was suddenly happening to her." After a couple of roles in other films, she starred opposite William Powell in the 1930 crime drama Shadow of the Law. That movie springboarded her into roles as a B-movie heroine.

In 1931 she was one of thirteen girls selected as "WAMPAS Baby Stars", a list that included future Hollywood star Marian Marsh. From 1930 to 1936 she starred in forty two films, mostly westerns or mysteries. She often starred opposite Tom Keene and Guinn "Big Boy" Williams. In the 1934 film serial, The Red Rider, she starred opposite early western film actor Buck Jones, with a supporting cast that included William Desmond and football player Jim Thorpe.

== Recognition ==
In 2002, Shilling received a Golden Boot Award for her contribution to Western films.

== Personal life ==
Shilling retired in 1936, to marry and have a family. She was married to Edward Cook from 1937 until his death in 1998. They had two children, Edward and Frances.

== Death ==
She never returned to acting, and died from natural causes on November 6, 2004, in a hospital in Torrance, California, aged 93.

== Filmography ==
=== Feature films ===
Year	Title	Role	Notes
1929	Wise Girls	Ruth Bence	
1930	Lord Byron of Broadway	Nancy	
1930	The Swellhead	Mamie Judd	
1930	Free and Easy	Singer / dancer	Uncredited
1930	Shadow of the Law	Edith Wentworth	
1930	On Your Back	Jeanne Burke	
1931	Beyond Victory	Ina	
1931	Young Donovan's Kid	Kitty Costello	
1931	The Common Law	Stephanie Brown	
1931	Sundown Trail	Dorothy ′Dottie′ Beals	
1931	Forgotten Women	Patricia Young	
1932	Shop Angel	Dorothy Hayes	
1932	The County Fair	Alice Ainsworth	
1932	A Man's Land	Peggy Turner	
1932	A Parisian Romance	Claudette	
1932	The Heart Punch	Kitty Doyle	
1933	Curtain at Eight	Anice Cresmer	
1934	Fighting to Live	Mary Carson	
1934	The Red Rider	Marie Maxwel	
1934	Inside Information	Anne Seton	
1934	Thunder Over Texas	Helen Mason	
1934	Elinor Norton	Publisher's Staff	Uncredited
1934	The Westerner	Juanita Barnes	
1935	Blazing Guns	Betty Lou Rickard	(as Marian Shilling)
1935	A Shot in the Dark	Jean Coates	
1935	Stone of Silver Creek	Martha Mason	
1935	Gun Smoke	Jean Culverson	(as Marian Shilling)
1935	Society Fever	Victoria Vandergriff	
1935	The Keeper of the Bees	Louise	
1935	Captured in Chinatown	Ann Parker	
1935	Rio Rattler	Mary Adams	
1935	Gun Play	Madge Holt	
1936	I'll Name the Murderer	Smitty	
1936	The Clutching Hand	Verna Gironda	
1936	Idaho Kid	Ruth Endicott	
1936	Romance Rides the Range	Carol Marland	
1936	Cavalcade of the West	Mary Christman	(final film role)

=== Short films ===
Year	Title	Role	Notes
1931	Take 'em and Shake 'em		Short
1931	June First	Marion	Short
1931	Easy to Get	Marion	Short
1932	Only Men Wanted		Short
1932	Rule 'Em and Weep	Ramona	Short
1932	Gigolettes	Marion	Short
1932	Niagara Falls		Short
