= Frances Dee =

American actress (1909–2004)

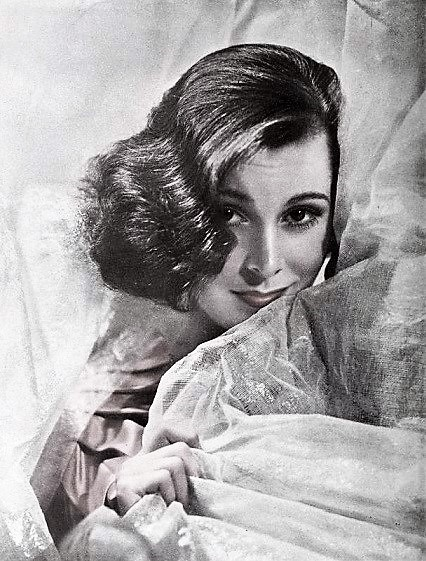
- Dee in 1936
- Born: Frances Marion Dee; November 26, 1909; Los Angeles, California, U.S.
- Died: March 6, 2004 (aged 94); Norwalk, Connecticut. U.S.
- Occupation: Actress
- Years active: 1929–1954
- Spouse: Joel McCrea (m. 1933; died 1990)
- Children: 3, including Jody McCrea

Frances Marion Dee (November 26, 1909 – March 6, 2004) was an American actress. Her first film was the musical Playboy of Paris (1930). She starred in films An American Tragedy (1931), Little Women (1933) and Becky Sharp (1935). She is also known for starring in the 1943 Val Lewton psychological horror film I Walked With a Zombie.

== Early life ==
The younger daughter of Francis "Frank" Marion Dee and his wife, the former Henriette Putnam, Frances Marion Dee was born in Los Angeles, California, where her father worked as a civil service examiner.

When Dee was seven years old, her family moved to Chicago, Illinois. She attended Shakespeare Grammar School and Hyde Park High School, where she went by the nickname of Frankie Dee.

After graduating from Hyde Park High in 1927, of which she was vice president of her senior class, as well as voted Belle of the Year, she spent two years at the University of Chicago, where she participated in dramatic activities, then returned to California.

== Career ==
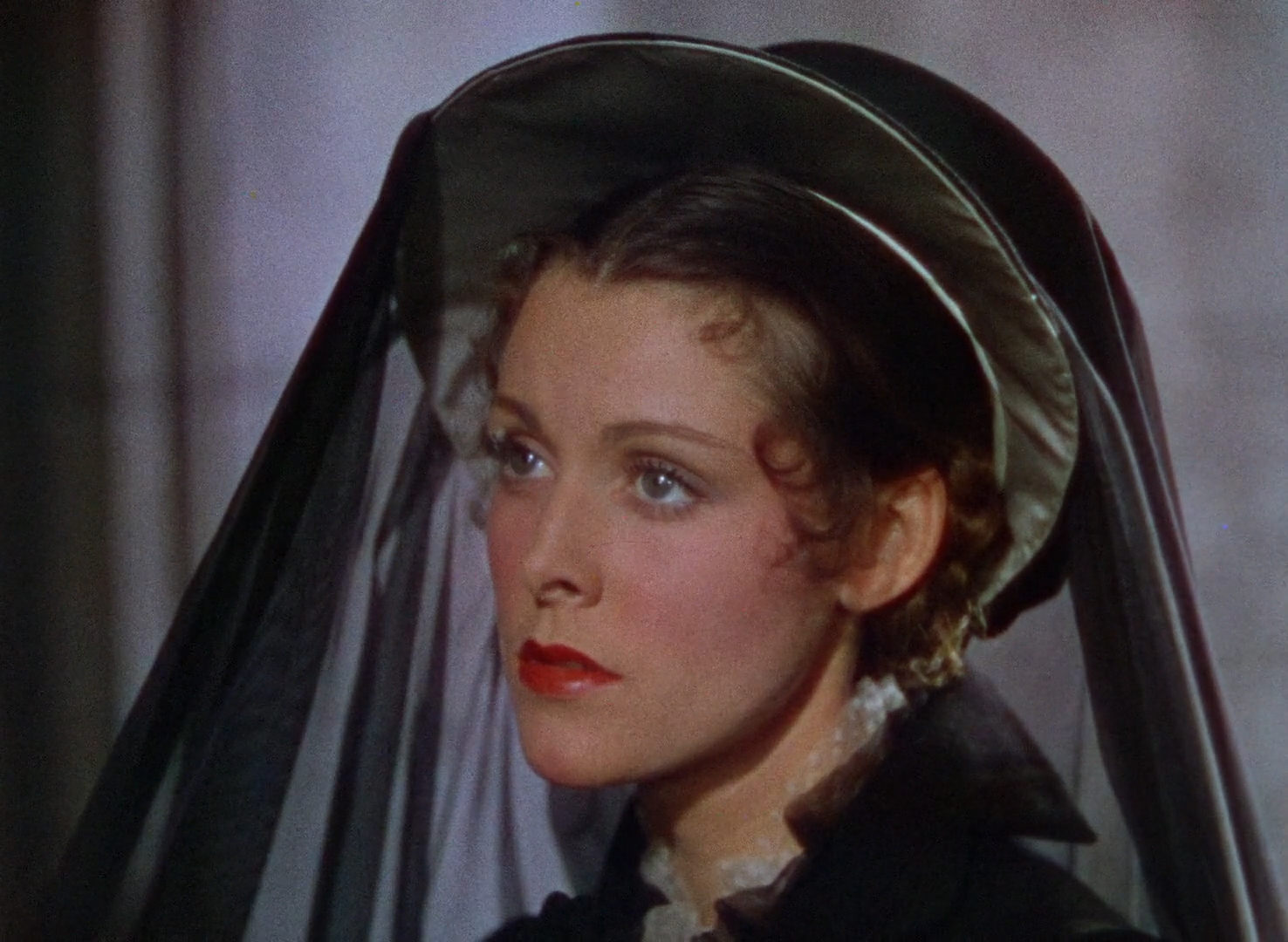
Dee in Becky Sharp (1935)

Following her sophomore year in 1929, she went on summer vacation with her mother and older sister to visit family in the Los Angeles area. She began working as a movie extra as a lark. Her big break came when she was still an extra; she was offered the lead opposite Maurice Chevalier in Playboy of Paris.

The audience appeal established in two films opposite Paramount stars Charles "Buddy" Rogers and Richard Arlen led to the co-starring role of Sondra Finchley, opposite Phillips Holmes and Sylvia Sidney, in Paramount Pictures's prestigious and controversial production of An American Tragedy, directed by Josef von Sternberg.

Dee's additional screen credits included June Moon, Little Women, Of Human Bondage, Becky Sharp, and Payment on Demand. She co-starred with her husband Joel McCrea in the Western Four Faces West (1948). She retired after production of Gypsy Colt in 1953.

== Personal life ==
Dee met actor Joel McCrea on the set of the 1933 film The Silver Cord. The couple married on October 20, 1933, after a whirlwind courtship, and remained married until McCrea's death in 1990. During their lifetime together, the McCreas lived, raised their children, and rode their horses on their ranch in what was then an unincorporated area of eastern Ventura County, California. They ultimately donated several hundred acres of their personal property to the newly formed Conejo Valley YMCA for the city of Thousand Oaks, California. Dee, like McCrea, was a Republican. Joel McCrea died on their 57th wedding anniversary.

Dee was honored at the 1998 Memphis Film Festival in Tennessee. In 2004, Frances Dee McCrea died in Norwalk, Connecticut due to complications from a stroke at the age of 94.

== Filmography ==
Year	Title	Role	Notes
1929	Words and Music	Co-Ed	Uncredited
1930	True to the Navy	Girl at Table	Uncredited
1930	A Man from Wyoming	Nurse	Uncredited
1930	Manslaughter	Party Guest	Uncredited
1930	Monte Carlo	Receptionist	Uncredited
1930	Follow Thru	Woman in Ladies' Locker Room	Uncredited
1930	Playboy of Paris	Yvonne Phillbert	
1930	Along Came Youth	Elinor Farrington	
1931	June Moon	Edna Baker	
1931	An American Tragedy	Sondra Flinchley	
1931	Caught	Kate Winslow	
1931	Rich Man's Folly	Ann Trumbull	
1931	Nice Women	Jerry Girard	
1931	Working Girls	Louise Adams	
1932	This Reckless Age	Lois Ingals	
1932	Sky Bride	Ruth's Friend	Uncredited
1932	The Strange Case of Clara Deane	Nancy Deane	
1932	Love Is a Racket	Mary Wodehouse	
1932	The Night of June 13	Ginger Blake	
1932	If I Had a Million	Mary Wallace	Uncredited
1933	The Crime of the Century	Doris Brandt	
1933	King of the Jungle	Ann Rogers	
1933	The Silver Cord	Hester	
1933	Headline Shooter	Jane Mallory	
1933	One Man's Journey	Joan Stockton	
1933	Little Women	Margaret "Meg" March	
1933	Blood Money	Elaine Talbart	
1934	Keep 'Em Rolling	Marjorie Deane	
1934	Coming Out Party	Joyce 'Joy' Stanhope	
1934	Finishing School	Virginia Radcliff	
1934	Of Human Bondage	Sally Altheny	
1935	Becky Sharp	Amelia Sedley	
1935	The Gay Deception	Mirabel Miller	
1936	Half Angel	Allison Lang	
1936	Come and Get It	Restaurant Patron	Uncredited
1937	Souls at Sea	Margaret Tarryton	
1937	Wells Fargo	Justine Pryor MacKay	
1938	If I Were King	Katherine de Vaucelles	
1939	Coast Guard	Nancy Bliss	
1941	So Ends Our Night	Marie Steiner	
1941	A Man Betrayed	Sabra Cameron	
1942	Meet the Stewarts	Candace Goodwin	
1943	I Walked With a Zombie	Betsy Conell	
1943	Happy Land	Agnes March	
1945	Patrick the Great	Lynn Andrews	
1947	The Private Affairs of Bel Ami	Marie de Verenne	
1948	Four Faces West	Fay Hollister	
1951	Payment on Demand	Eileen Banson	
1951	Reunion in Reno	Mrs. Doris Linaker	
1952	Because of You	Susan Arnold	
1953	Mister Scoutmaster	Helen	
1954	Gypsy Colt	Em MacWade	
2006	Far as the Eye Can See	Grandma	Short
