= Gertrude Short =

American actress (1902–1968)

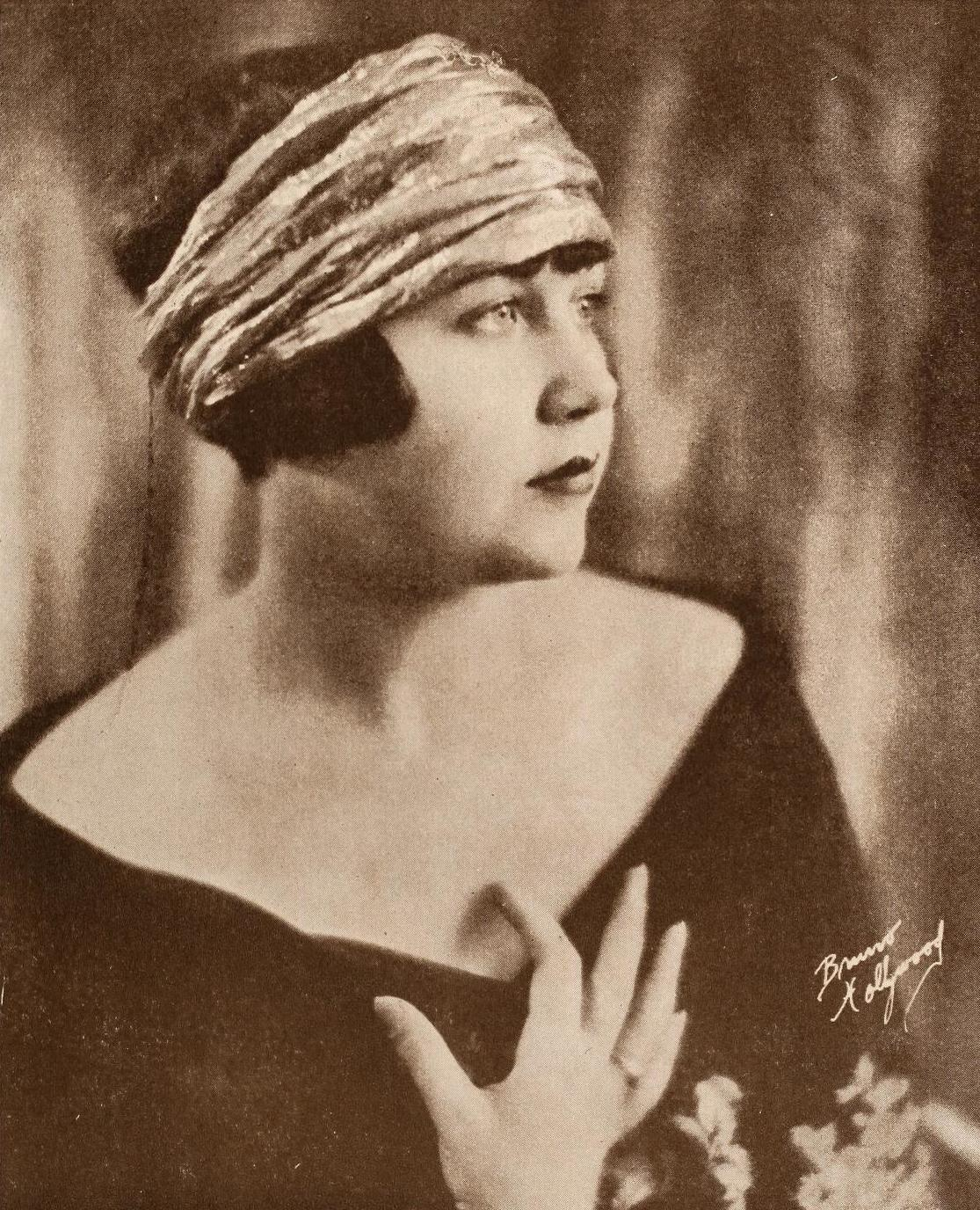
- Short in 1923
- Born: Carmen Gertrude Short; April 6, 1902; Cincinnati, Ohio, U.S.
- Died: July 31, 1968 (aged 66); Hollywood, California, U.S.
- Occupation: Actress
- Years active: 1912–1945
- Spouse(s): Scott Pembroke (m. December 5, 1925-19?? (div.)
- Relatives: Antrim Short (brother)

Carmen Gertrude Short (April 6, 1902 – July 31, 1968) was an American film actress of the silent and early sound era. She appeared in more than 130 films between 1912 and 1945.

== Biography ==
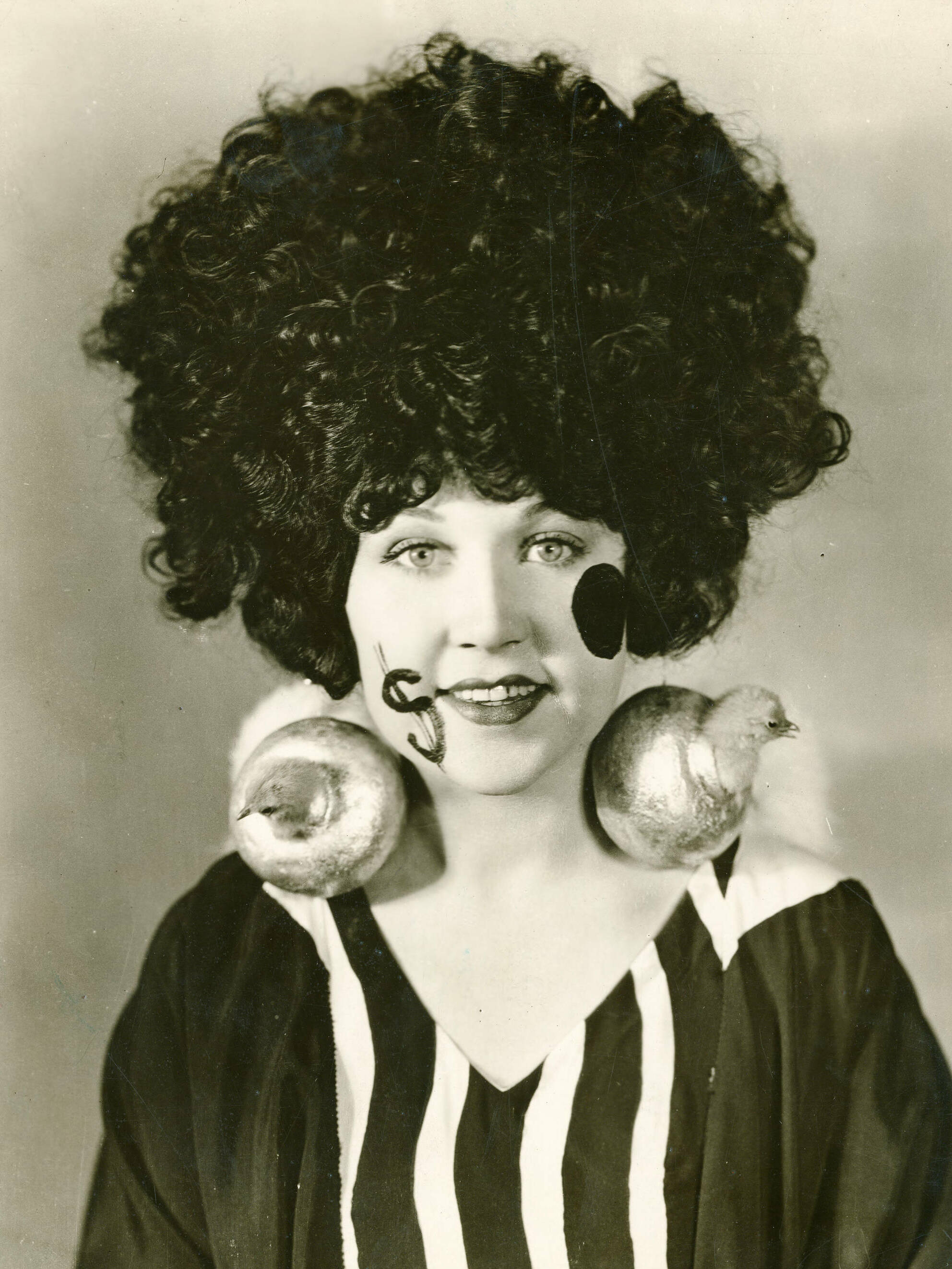
Gertrude Short in 1925

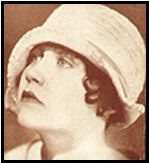
Gertrude Short in 1918

Gertrude Short was born in Cincinnati, Ohio, the daughter of actors Lewis and Stella Short. From 1913 to 1945, she acted on stage, on film, and in vaudeville.

Short debuted on stage in The Story of the Golden Fleece in San Francisco when she was 5 years old. In her screen debut, she portrayed Little Eva in the silent film Uncle Tom's Cabin. She went on to act in films through the 1930s and into the 1940s. Film companies with which she worked included Edison, Metro, Paramount, Robertson-Cole, and Universal.

Short's Broadway credits include Arrest That Woman (1936). She stopped acting during World War II and went to work for Lockheed Corporation, from which she retired in 1967.

Short was married to director Scott Pembroke. She died in Hollywood, California, on July 31, 1968, after a brief illness. She was the sister of Antrim Short and Florence Aadland. Actress Blanche Sweet was a cousin. She is buried at Hollywood Forever Cemetery in Hollywood, California.

== Selected filmography ==
- Hearts in Conflict (1912 short)
- Cinders (1913 short)
- The Sea Urchin (1913 short)
- The Honor of the Mounted (1914 short)
- The Embezzler (1914 short)
- The Test (1914)
- The Cowboy and the Lady (1915)
- The Little Princess (1917)
- The Only Road (1918)
- Riddle Gawne (1918)
- In Mizzoura (1919)
- Blackie's Redemption (1919)
- You Never Can Tell (1920)
- She Couldn't Help It (1920)
- Cinderella's Twin (1920)
- The Blot (1921)
- Leap Year (1921)
- Fool's Paradise (1921)
- Rent Free (1922)
- Headin' West (1922)
- The Prisoner (1923)
- Breaking Into Society (1923)
- The Man Life Passed By (1923)
- Crinoline and Romance (1923)
- The Narrow Street (1925)
- Tessie (1925)
- The People vs. Nancy Preston (1925)
- The Other Woman's Story (1925)
- Ladies of Leisure (1926)
- The Lily (1926)
- Sweet Adeline (1926)
- Adam and Evil (1927)
- The Masked Woman (1927)
- Polly of the Movies (1927)
- Ladies at Ease (1927)
- The Show (1927)
- Tillie the Toiler (1927)
- The Three Outcasts (1929)
- The Broadway Hoofer (1929)
- Gold Diggers of Broadway (1929)
- Bulldog Drummond (1929)
- Take 'em and Shake 'em (1931)
- Laughing Sinners (1931)
- Gigolettes (1932)
- Niagara Falls (1932)
- Secret Sinners (1933)
- Love Birds (1934)
- The Thin Man (1934)
- Penny Wisdom (1937)
