= Hooper Atchley =

American actor (1887–1943)

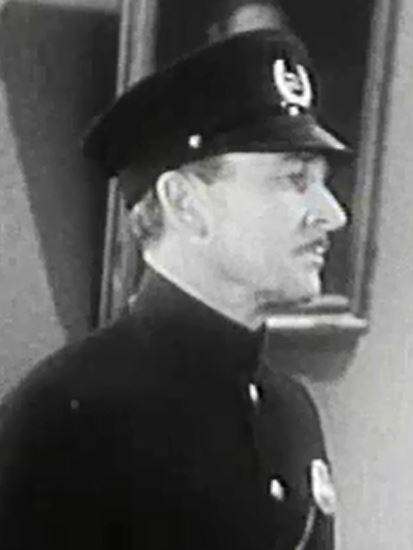
- Atchley in Hell's House (1932)
- Born: Lemuel Hooper Atchley; April 30, 1887; Ebenezer, Marion County, Tennessee U.S.
- Died: November 17, 1943 (aged 56); Hollywood, California, U.S.
- Occupation: Film actor
- Years active: 1929–1943
- Spouse: Violet Yahar

Lemuel Hooper Atchley (April 30, 1887 – November 17, 1943) was an American film actor.

Atchley was the son of Mr. and Mrs. P. S. Atchley. He was a 1908 graduate of the Knoxville, Tennessee, school system.

Atchley's first professional acting occurred with a stock theater company in Fort Wayne, Indiana. He appeared in 214 films between 1929 and 1944 and is known for his appearance as the inconsiderate father in the Our Gang film Birthday Blues (1932). Atchley's Broadway credits included Jarnegan (1928), Across the Street (1924), and Marie Dressler's "All Star Gambol" (1913).

== Death ==
Atchley died of a self-inflicted gunshot wound on November 17, 1943, aged 56, in Hollywood.

== Partial filmography ==
- The Santa Fe Trail (1930)
- Branded Men (1931)
- Men in Her Life (1931)
- Birthday Blues (1932)
- False Faces (1932)
- Hell's House (1932)
- The Three Musketeers (1933)
- Queen Christina (1933) (uncredited)
- Big Time or Bust (1933)
- The Westerner (1934)
- Mystery Mountain (1934)
- The Prescott Kid (1934)
- Against the Law (1934)
- Murder in the Private Car (1934) (uncredited)
- The Adventures of Rex and Rinty (1935)
- Behind the Green Lights (1935)
- Unknown Woman (1935)
- Hearts in Bondage (1936)
- Love and Hisses (1937)
- Mr. Wong, Detective (1938)
- Cipher Bureau (1938)
- The Mystery of Mr. Wong (1939)
- The Fatal Hour (1940)
- The Gay Caballero (1940)
- Dick Tracy vs. Crime, Inc. (1941)
- Black Hills Express (1943)
