= O'Malley of the Mounted (1921 film) =

1921 film

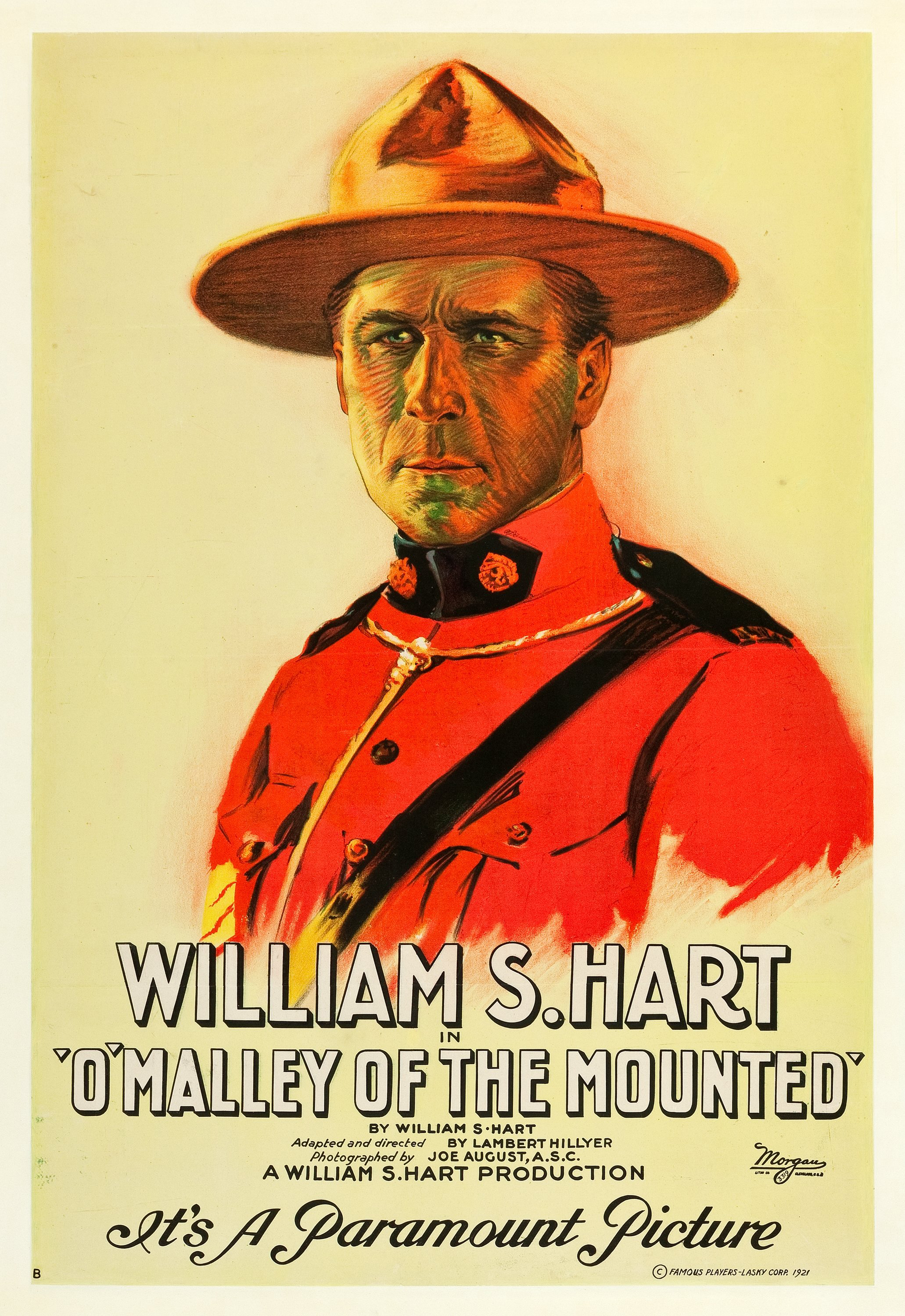
- Theatrical release poster
- Directed by: Lambert Hillyer
- Screenplay by: William S. Hart; Lambert Hillyer
- Produced by: William S. Hart
- Starring: William S. Hart; Eva Novak; Leo Willis; Alfred Allen; Bert Sprotte; Antrim Short
- Cinematography: Joseph H. August
- Edited by: LeRoy Stone
- Production company: William S. Hart Productions
- Distributed by: Paramount Pictures
- Release date: February 6, 1921
- Running time: 60 minutes
- Country: United States
- Languages: Silent; English intertitles

O'Malley of the Mounted is a 1921 American silent Western film directed by Lambert Hillyer and written by Hillyer and William S. Hart. The film stars William S. Hart, Eva Novak, Leo Willis, Alfred Allen, Bert Sprotte, and Antrim Short. The film was released on February 6, 1921, by Paramount Pictures.

== Plot ==
In 1921, the Motion Picture World summarized,

"O'Malley of the Mounted" is a sergeant who has won his stripes by getting any criminal he is sent out to arrest, this in wild Northwestern territory amid men who dare follow their own impulses rather than obey the law.

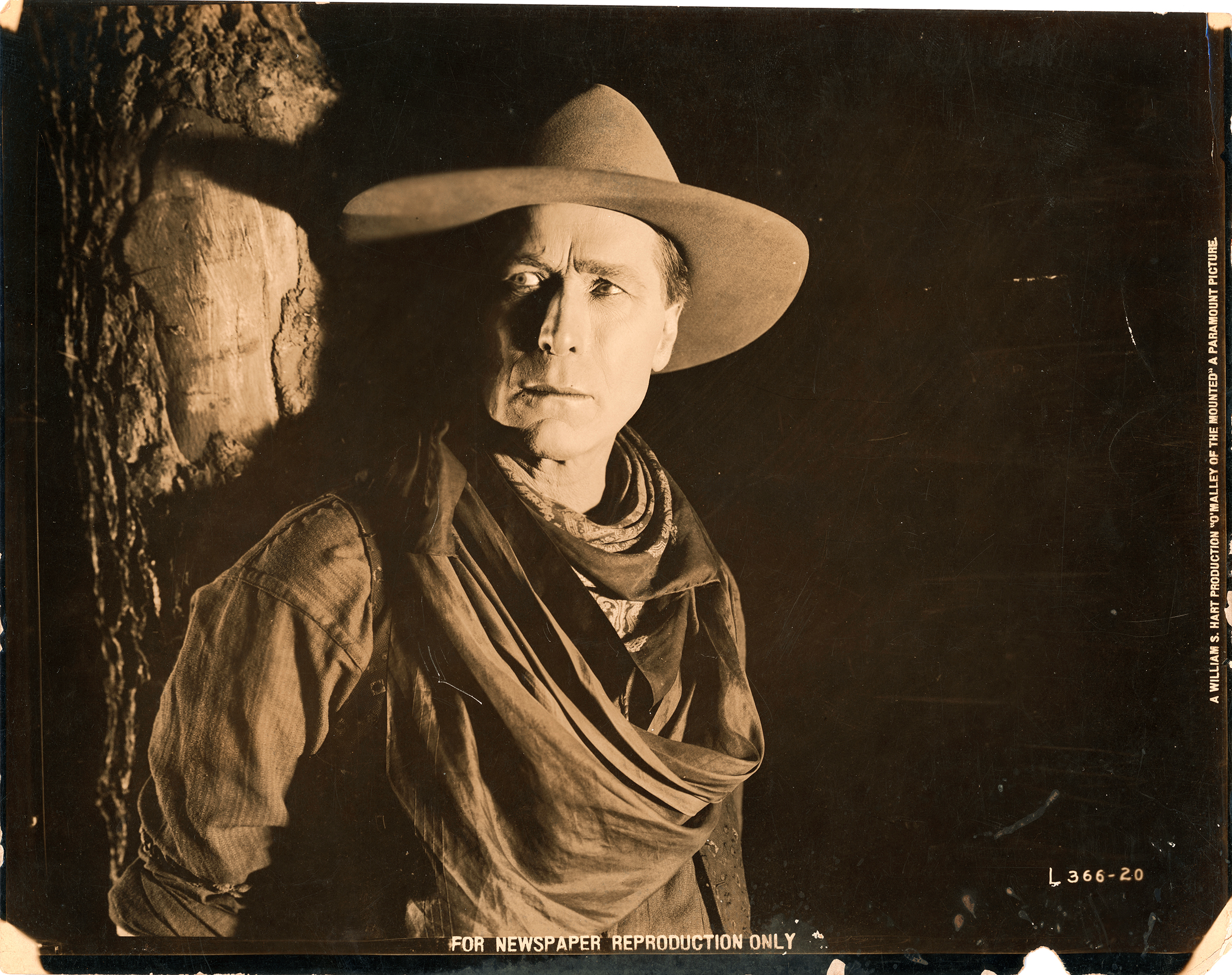
1921 sepia tone publicity photo of Hart as O'Malley

O'Malley is assigned to arrest La Grange, a man who murdered a saloon keeper. O'Malley believes La Grange went south to escape over the border into America.

He encounters outlaws at a saloon in Forker City. He joins their gang by robbing a bank of $5,000.

He soon develops a crush on Rose Lanier and a friendship with her brother, Bud, a fugitive of the law.

Later, O'Malley fights a character named Red Jaeger who later exposes O'Malley as a Mountie and traitor. O'Malley is bound to a tree as the criminals plan to execute him at daybreak via hanging. Rose Lanier pretends to be against him, but clandestinely hands him a knife to rescue him.

According to Motion Picture World, the film concludes:

By Rose and Bud the sergeant is rescued from sure death. While riding with them toward the border he confirms his suspicions that Bud is the murderer he is seeking, but finds that the killing was done to avenge a wronged sister. He leaves the brother and sister to make his report, and finds his act justified by his commanding officer. He returns to his loved one no longer "O'Malley of the Mounted."

== Cast ==
- William S. Hart as Sergeant O'Malley
- Eva Novak as Rose Lanier
- Leo Willis as Red Jaeger
- Alfred Allen as Big Judson
- Bert Sprotte as Sheriff
- Antrim Short as Bud Lanier

== Preservation ==
A copy of the film is in the Library of Congress and the Museum of Modern Art film archives.

== Legacy ==
In 1959, the film's plot, as well as its characters, were lampooned as part of The Adventures of Rocky and Bullwinkle and Friends. The inspired segment is called Dudley Do-Right of the Mounties. Dudley Do-Right's first appearance specifically incorporates silent film tropes such as intertitles and iris shots as well as incorporating a similar plot.

== Gallery ==
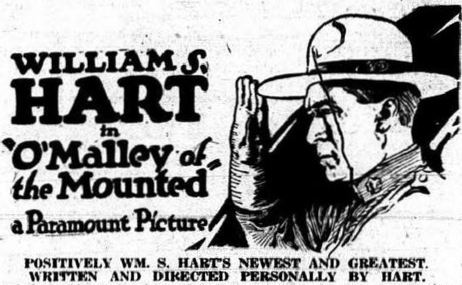
Newspaper ad for the American western film O'Malley of the Mounted (1921) with William S. Hart, on page 4 of the April 15, 1921 The St. Louis Argus.

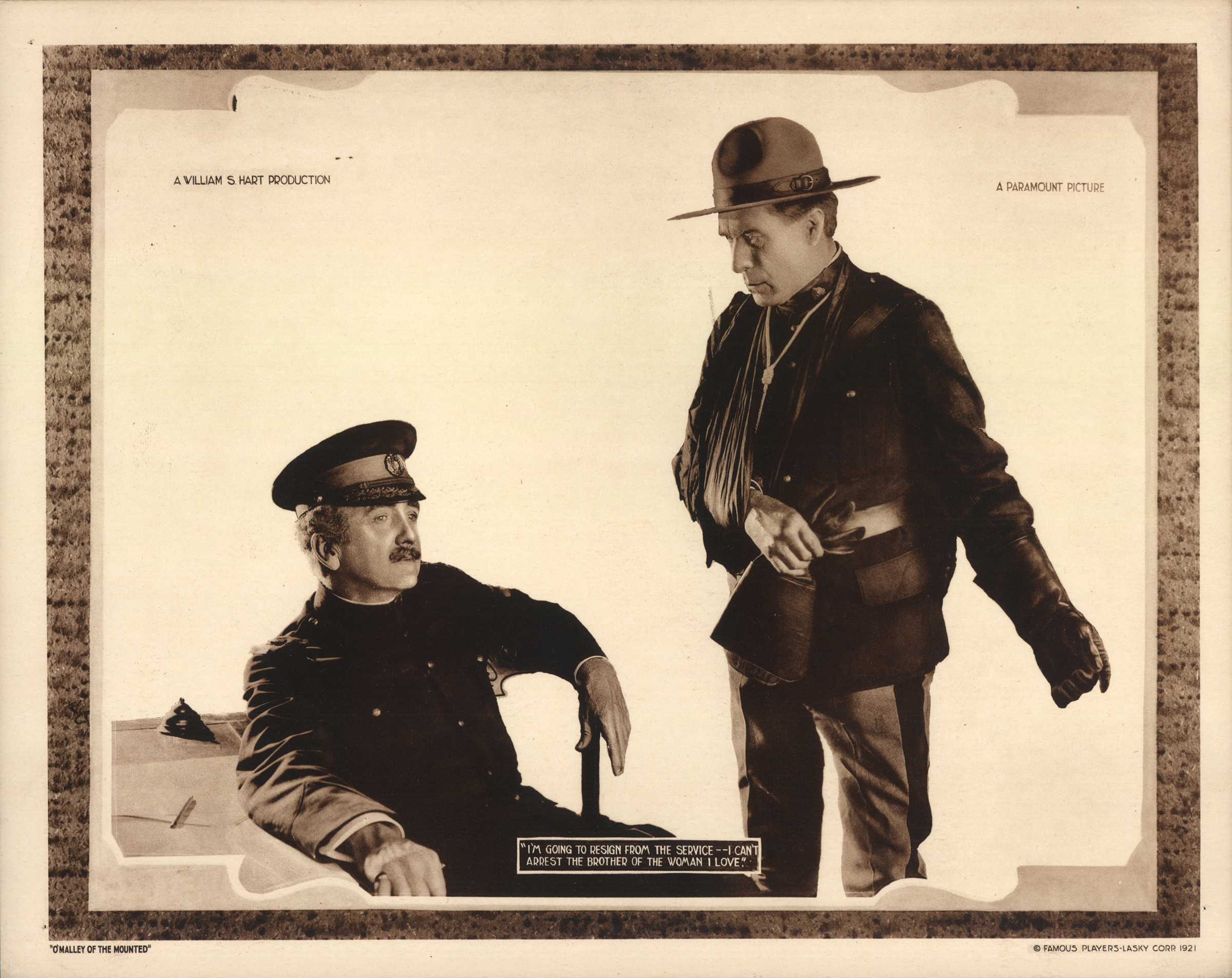
A 1921 lobby card depicting a scene from the film; William S. Hart's character tells Bert Sprotte's character, "I'm going to resign from the service -- I can't arrest the brother of the woman I love."
