= His Captive Woman =

1929 film

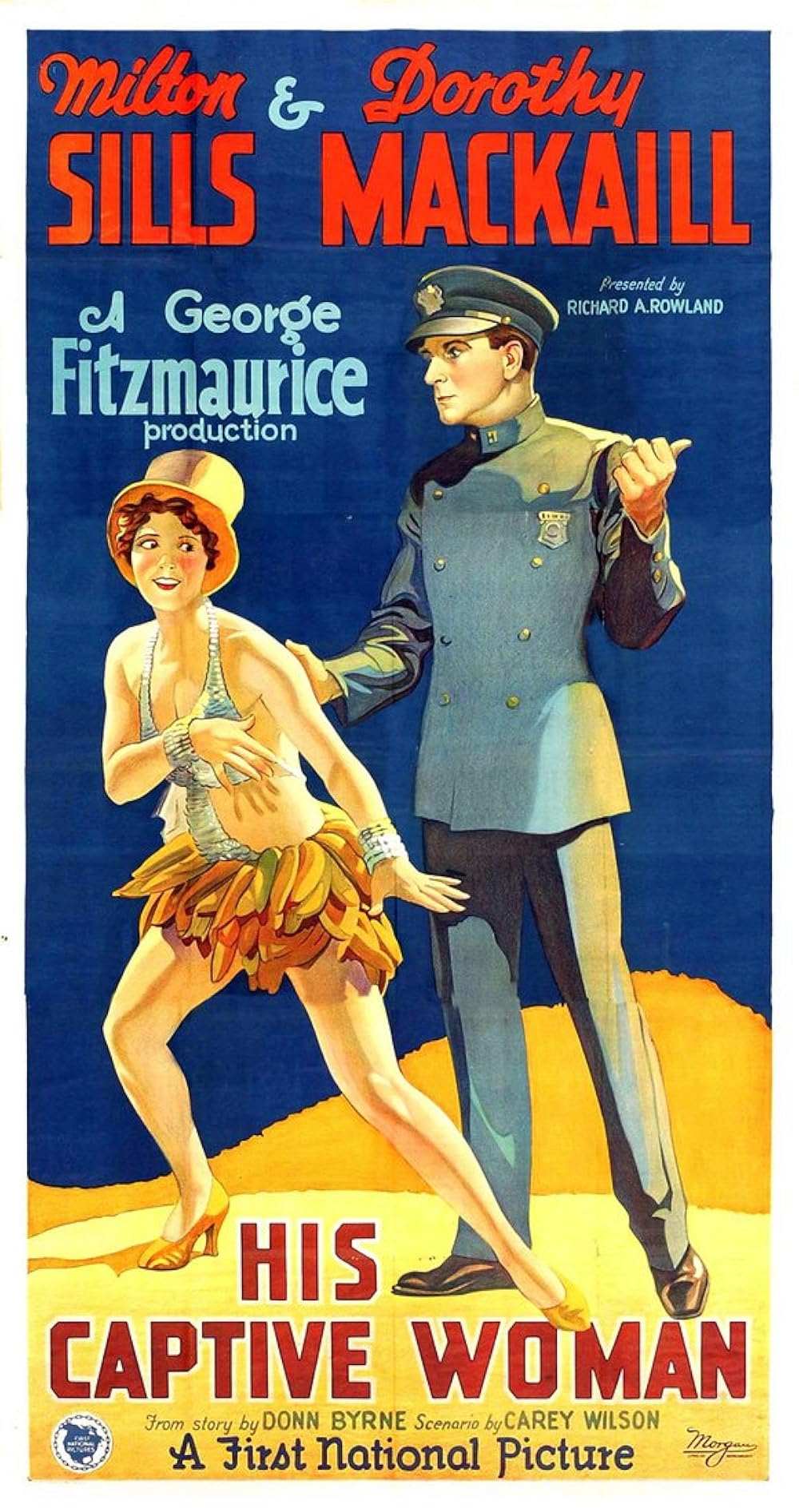
- Theatrical release poster
- Directed by: George Fitzmaurice
- Written by: Carey Wilson (scenario); Paul Perez (dialogue, titles)
- Based on: Changeling, a short story by Donn Byrne from Changeling and Other Stories c.1923
- Produced by: Richard A. Rowland
- Starring: Milton Sills; Dorothy Mackaill
- Cinematography: Lee Garmes
- Edited by: Stuart Heisler
- Production company: First National Pictures
- Distributed by: Warner Bros. Pictures
- Release date: April 2, 1929
- Running time: 80 minutes
- Country: United States
- Languages: Sound (Part-Talkie); English Intertitles

His Captive Woman is a 1929 American sound part-talkie part-talking drama film directed by George Fitzmaurice and starring Milton Sills and Dorothy Mackaill. In addition to sequences with audible dialogue or talking sequences, the film features a synchronized musical score and sound effects along with English intertitles. According to the film review in Variety, 50 percent of the total running time featured dialogue. These talking sequences all took place during the courtroom scenes in the picture. The soundtrack was recorded using the Vitaphone sound-on-disc system. This film is "based on the short story "Changeling" by Donn Byrne in Changeling and Other Stories (New York, 1923)." It was produced and distributed by First National Pictures which was already a subsidiary of Warner Bros. Pictures. Both Mackaill and Sills as well as director Fitzmaurice had worked together on the previous year's The Barker.

== Plot ==
Anna Janssen, a glamorous cabaret dancer in New York, is kept in luxury by a wealthy older lover. When he begins to fall for another dancer, Anna, in a jealous rage, shoots and kills him. With help from another admirer, she flees the city aboard a private yacht bound for the South Seas.

In the islands, Anna quickly becomes the darling of the colonial fast set, a figure of fascination and flirtation. The local governor is especially taken with her charms and refuses to extradite her, using a legal technicality to delay her return until the next passenger liner departs.

But Officer Thomas McCarthy, a serious and upright New York policeman, is sent to bring her back to justice. Unwilling to wait, he charters a steamer and forces Anna aboard. Before they can return to America, however, a violent storm wrecks the ship and strands them alone on a deserted island.

Anna attempts to use her beauty to seduce McCarthy, but he remains cold and dutiful, refusing to be swayed by her flirtations. Forced to survive together, they build a rough hut from wreckage and live off salvaged ship's stores. McCarthy keeps a constant watch, maintaining a beacon fire, ever mindful of his sworn duty to deliver her to trial.

Life on the island begins to change Anna. Far from the temptations and pretenses of her old life, she discovers a simpler self and falls genuinely in love with McCarthy. He still resists her—until the day she risks her life to save him from a shark. Slowly, his walls begin to crumble.

When Anna falls seriously ill, McCarthy tends to her devotedly. After she recovers, she proposes they marry themselves in the sight of God, assuming they may never be rescued. McCarthy agrees, and the two experience a quiet, redemptive happiness. Anna is no longer a fugitive, but a woman transformed by love.

Months later, a steamer appears on the horizon. Despite his feelings, McCarthy lights the signal fire—his duty, after all, remains. They are rescued and returned to New York.

At Anna's trial, the courtroom is stunned by the grace and gentleness of the woman before them—so different from the fiery showgirl in the headlines. Her attorney offers little defense, allowing the grim details of her past to speak for themselves. The jury listens as McCarthy recounts his pursuit, her arrest, and their ordeal on the island.

Bound by the law, the judge instructs the jury to return a guilty verdict. But recognizing the extraordinary transformation Anna has undergone—and the deep love between her and McCarthy—the judge orders that the two be legally married.

Then, in an extraordinary act of mercy, he sentences them both to life—not in prison, but on the island, where they had already found freedom, redemption, and one another.

== Cast ==
- Milton Sills as Officer Thomas McCarthy
- Dorothy Mackaill as Anna Janssen
- Gladden James as Alastair De Vries
- Jed Prouty as Fatty Fargo
- Sidney Bracey as Means
- Gertrude Howard as Lavoris Smythe
- Marion Byron as Baby Meyers
- George Fawcett as Howard Donegan
- William Holden as The Court Judge
- Frank Reicher as The District Attorney
- August Tollaire as The Governor of the Island

== Music ==
The soundtrack features two theme songs, namely, Irving Berlin's "Lady of the Evening" and Victor Herbert's "To The Land Of My Own Romance" which are played instrumentally throughout the picture.

== Preservation ==
Prints of His Captive Woman are maintained in the Library of Congress and reportedly in the Gosfilmofond Archive.

== See also ==
- List of early sound feature films (1926–1929)
