= Mae Madison =

American actress (1915–2004)

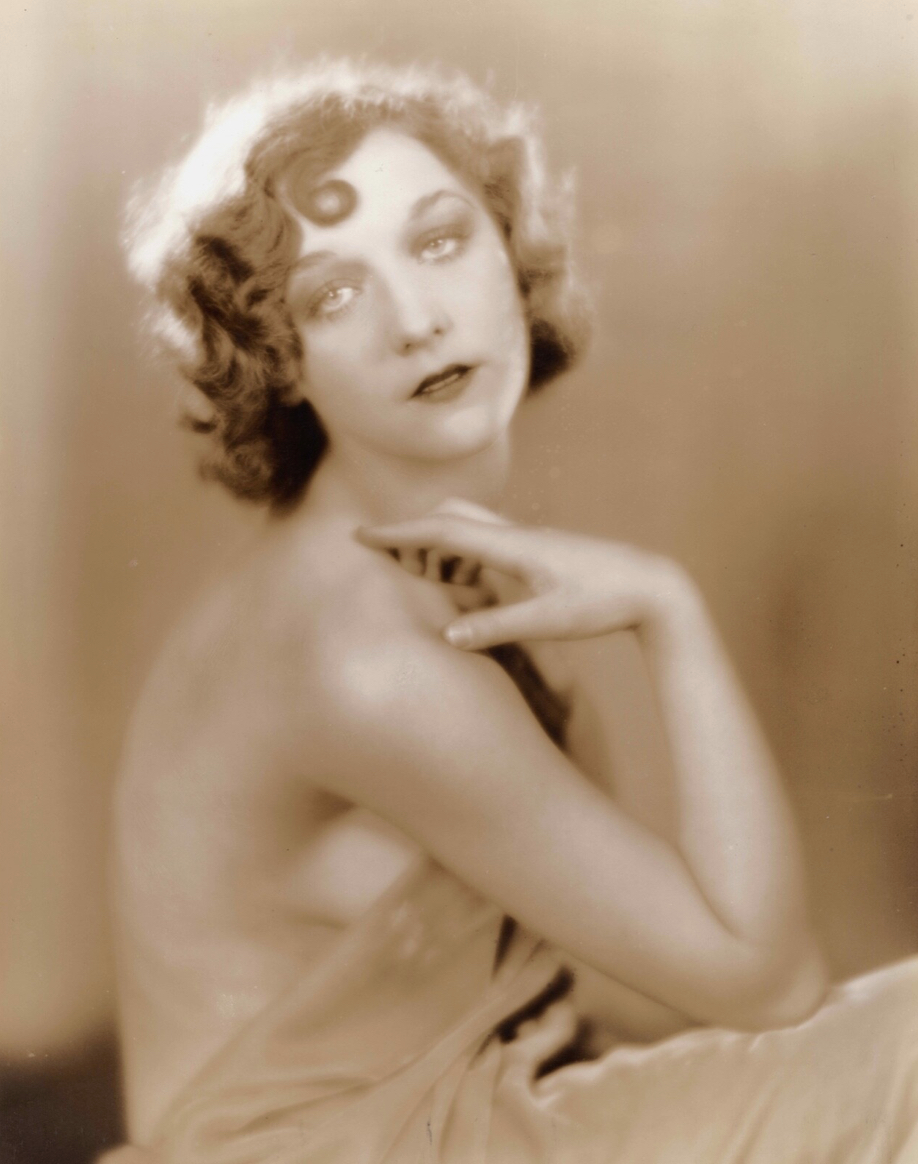
- Madison c. 1920
- Born: Mariska Megyzsi; September 17, 1915; Los Angeles, California, U.S.
- Died: November 1, 2004 (aged 89); Los Angeles, California, U.S.
- Occupation: Film actress
- Years active: 1928–1935
- Spouse: William C. McGann (m. 1932; div. 1933) Jack MacGowan (m. 1935; div. 1937) Aristide D'Angelo (m. 1939; died 1960)

Mae Madison (born Mariska Megyzsi, September 17, 1915 – November 1, 2004) was an American film actress. She was born in Los Angeles, California. Her parents were from Hungary.

Madison started out as a dancer in the late 1920s. She signed a contract with Warner Bros. and appeared in several films in the 1930s. She had supporting roles in films such as Bought (1931), Her Majesty, Love (1931), The Mouthpiece (1932), So Big (1932), and The Big Stampede (1932). In 2000, she took part in the documentary I Used to Be in Pictures, which featured many actresses from the early years of Hollywood.

Madison died in Los Angeles on November 1, 2004, at the age of 89.

== Personal life ==
Madison was married three times. She married the film director William C. McGann in 1932. They divorced in 1933. She was married to musical playwright Jack MacGowan between 1935 and 1937. She married Aristide D'Angelo, a theatre professor, in 1939. He died in 1960.

== Filmography ==
Year	Title	Role
1928	The Play Girl	Flaper
1929	Fox Movietone Follies of 1929	Dancer
1929	Words and Music	Ensemble member
1929	Sunny Side Up	Chorine
1930	Whoopee!	Girl
1931	Smart Money	Irontown blonde
1931	The Reckless Hour	Rita
1931	Bought	Natalie Ransone
1931	Expensive Women	Irene
1931	The Mad Genius	Olga Chekova
1931	Her Majesty, Love	Elli
1931	Manhattan Parade	Woman in charge of fitting
1932	Union Depot	Waitress
1932	Play Girl	May
1932	The Mouthpiece	Elaine
1932	So Big	Julie Hempel
1932	The Rich Are Always with Us	First gossiper in 1920
1932	The Tenderfoot	Café maid
1932	Miss Pinkerton	Second nurse
1932	The Big Stampede	Ginger Malloy
1933	Gold Diggers of 1933	Gold digger
1933	Footlight Parade	Chorus girl
1933	Sitting Pretty	Chorus girl
1934	Coming Out Party	Party guest
1934	Now I'll Tell	Waitress
1934	Dames	Chorus girl
1934	Kid Millions	Goldwyn girl
1935	Folies Bergère de Paris	Girl in secretary number
1935	Reckless	Chorine
1935	Redheads on Parade	Minor role
