= Frank Fay (comedian) =

American actor and comedian (1891–1961)

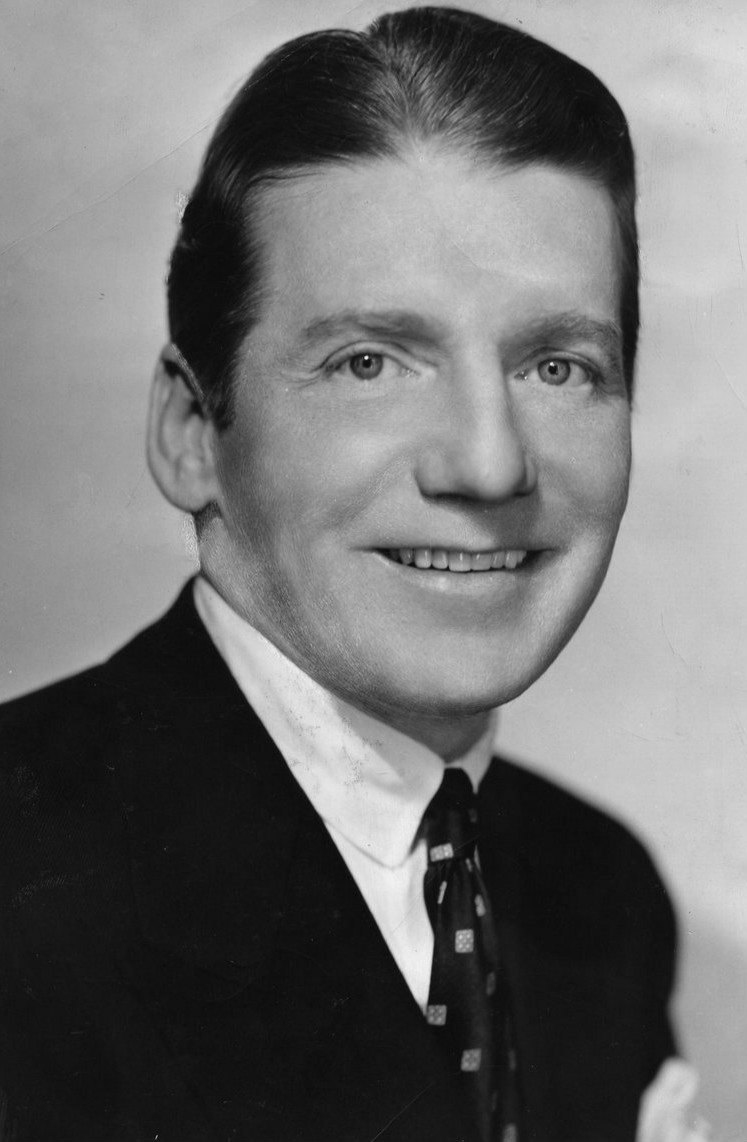
- Fay in 1936
- Born: Francis Anthony Donner; November 17, 1891; San Francisco, California, U.S.
- Died: September 25, 1961 (aged 69); Santa Monica, California, U.S.
- Resting place: Calvary Cemetery, Los Angeles
- Years active: 1918–1955
- Spouses: Frances White (m. 1917; div. 1917) Barbara Stanwyck (m. 1928; div. 1935): Lee Buchanan (m. 19??; div. 19??)
- Children: 1

Frank Fay (born Francis Anthony Donner; November 17, 1891 – September 25, 1961) was an American vaudeville comedian, film actor, and stage actor. Considered an important pioneer in comedy, he has been referred to as "the first stand-up". For a time he was a well known and influential star, vaudeville's highest-paid headliner, earning $17,500 a week in the 1920s, but he later fell into obscurity, in part because of his abrasive personality and fascist political views. He played the role of Elwood P. Dowd in the 1944 Broadway play Harvey by the American playwright Mary Coyle Chase. He is best known as the first husband of actress Barbara Stanwyck.

Frank Fay was notorious for his narcissism, bigotry, and alcoholism, and according to the American Vaudeville Museum, "even when sober, he was dismissive and unpleasant, and he was disliked by most of his contemporaries". Although very talented, Fay offended most of the people he worked with because of his enormous ego. Former vaudevillian and radio star Fred Allen remarked, "The last time I saw him he was walking down Lover's Lane, holding his own hand." Actor Robert Wagner wrote that Fay was "one of the most dreadful men in the history of show business. Fay was a drunk, an anti-Semite, and a wife-beater, and Barbara [Stanwyck] had had to endure all of that", while according to actor and comedian Milton Berle "Fay's friends could be counted on the missing arm of a one-armed man." Berle, who was Jewish, claimed to have once hit Fay in the face with a stage brace after Fay, on seeing the teenaged Berle watching his act from offstage, called out, "Get that little kike out of the wings." Comedy writer Milt Josefsberg recalled that "Fay referred to other comedians as 'Jew bastards.'" Jack Benny did not like Frank Fay personally or professionally: "When he appeared in vaudeville he rarely changed his act or polished it. He never bothered to remove jokes or lines that were dated. His attitude toward the audience was, 'You people are lucky enough to see the great Frank Fay no matter what I do.'"

== Early life ==
Fay was born in San Francisco, California, to Irish Catholic parents. He took the professional name of Frank Fay after concluding that his birth name was not suitable for the stage.

As a child, he appeared in Victor Herbert's operetta Babes in Toyland.

== Vaudeville ==
Fay enjoyed considerable success as a variety artist starting around 1918, telling jokes and stories in a carefully planned "off the cuff" manner that was very original for the time. He was one of the most analyzed comedians, with his timing and delivery praised.

He formed several partnerships, including with Lieutenant Gitz Rice and appearing as Dyer & Fay and Fay Fay & Co.

During the 1920s, Fay was vaudeville's highest-paid headliner, earning $17,500 a week. He often played the Palace Theatre in New York City, sometimes once a month.

Later, he was successful as a revue and nightclub comedian and master of ceremonies, arguably originating the form, and also appeared frequently on radio shows. He was cast in a small role as master of ceremonies in the nightclub sequence of Nothing Sacred (1937).

One of his most enduring routines, which he performed as late as the 1950s, was taking a popular song and analysing the "senseless" lyrics. It did not endear him to songwriters. For example, "Tea for Two":

"Picture you, upon my knee." (This guy just owns one chair?)
"Just tea for two and two for tea, me for you, and you for me, alone"
So, here's the situation: the guy just has one chair, but enough tea for two, so he has two for tea. If anyone else shows up, he shoots 'em!
"Nobody near us, to see us or hear us." Who'd want to listen to a couple of people drinking tea?

"We won't have it known, dear, that we own a telephone."
So, this guy's too cheap to get another chair, he has a telephone, but won't tell anyone about it!

"Dawn will break, and you'll awake, and start to bake a sugar cake."
Oh, this poor woman's life, I can see it now. Dawn breaks, and she's got to start baking, can't even run a brush through her hair, down in the dark, feeling around for the flour...

"For me to take for all the guys to see."
I can see that! "Hey, guys, I've got something the wife gave me!"
Is it a new tie? Is it a set of tires?
Nahhh—it's a sugar cake! Three layers, with a coconut cream filling!
"Oh, that's just ducky!," they all say, and they crown him with it.

== Film ==
When talkies arrived, Warner Bros. studio was eager to put him under contract along with a host of other famous stage personalities. Fay was cast as master of ceremonies in Warner Bros.' most expensive production of 1929, the all-star, all-talking revue Show of Shows (1929). Based on the success of that film, Fay was quickly signed up for an all-Technicolor musical comedy entitled Under a Texas Moon (1930), in which he also displayed his singing abilities. The movie was a box-office success and made a hit of the theme song, also titled "Under a Texas Moon". Fay sang the theme song several times throughout the picture. Another expensive picture, Bright Lights (1930), an extravagant all-Technicolor musical, quickly followed. Fay also starred in The Matrimonial Bed (1930), a Pre-Code comedy in which he sang the song "Fleur d'Amour" twice. Fay quickly found himself associated with musical films, and this led to a decline in his popularity when public interest in musical films waned in 1931. In fact, in his next film, God's Gift to Women (1931), the musical sequences were cut for the American release, but were retained for other countries.

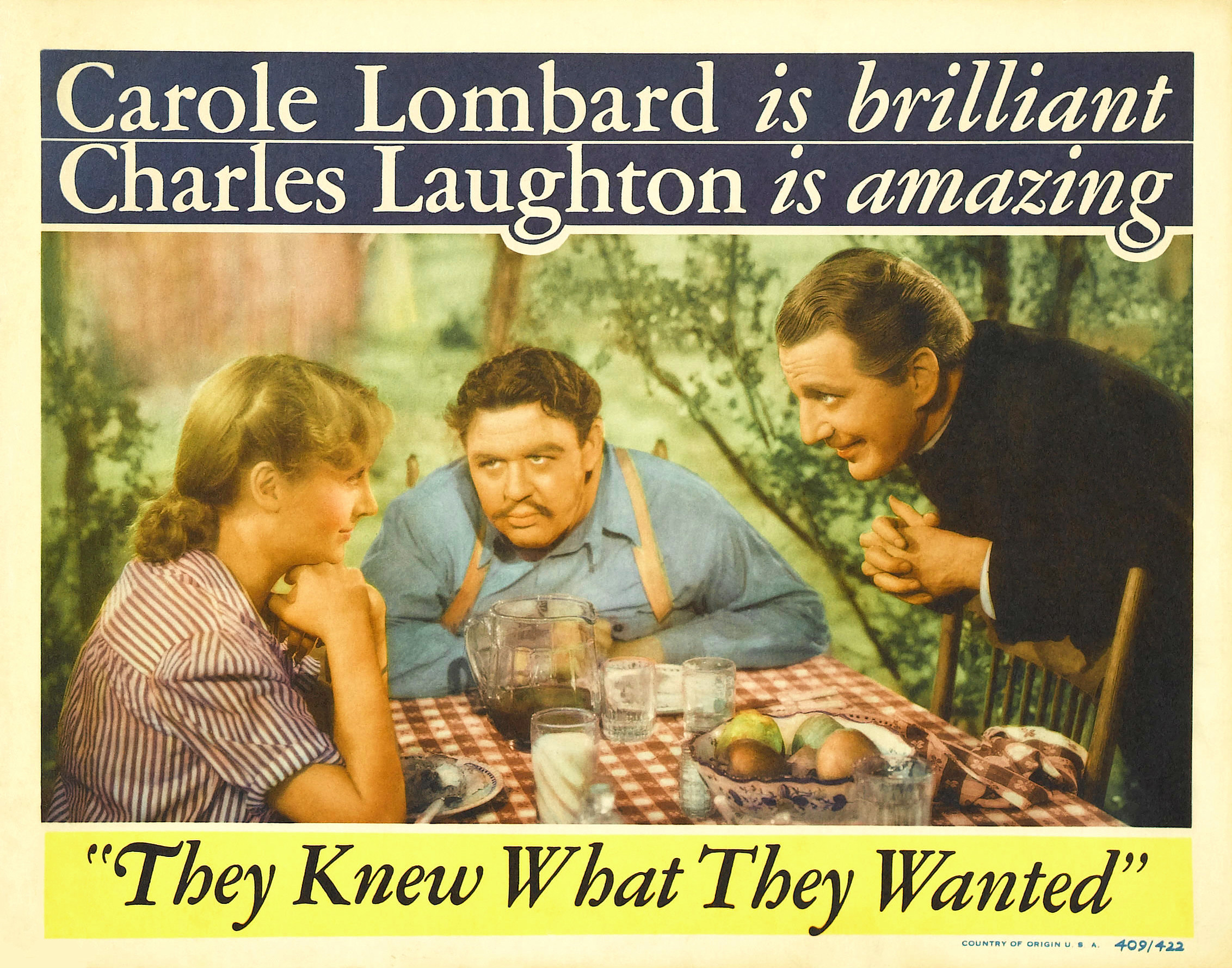
L–R: Carole Lombard, Charles Laughton and Frank Fay in They Knew What They Wanted (1940)

Fay was always cast as a debonair lover, irresistible to women, and he frequently threw in suggestive jokes (e.g., on homosexuality and sex). His pre-Code risque humor did not bode well with the rising conservative movement ushered in by the Great Depression. Fay's performance in God's Gift to Women failed to get the rave reviews he had formerly enjoyed. He attempted to produce his own picture in 1932 and struck a deal with Warner Bros. to have them release his film A Fool's Advice. It failed, and resurfaced five years later as Meet the Mayor, with new titles prepared by the Warner Bros. studio. These new credits reflect the low regard Fay's professional colleagues had for him: his name appears in the smallest possible type as both star and author, with the supporting cast members' names more than twice the size of Fay's. Fay made only one more appearance for Warner, billed near the bottom of the cast in Stars Over Broadway (1935), in which, presiding over a radio amateur hour, he made sly remarks at the contestants' expense. Most of the trade reviews paid scant attention to Fay but Variety's Joe Bigelow remembered him: "An amateur radio broadcast bit includes some m.c.'ing by Frank Fay. It ends with Pat O'Brien beating Fay to the punch with a sarcastic topper. Out-boffing Fay is something else they can only do in pictures."

Fay's next screen effort did not come about until 1940, a Paramount feature with former Warner stars Joan Blondell, Dick Powell, and Gloria Dickson, I Want a Divorce. The same year Fay had a dramatic role in a major motion picture, They Knew What They Wanted.

== Radio ==
Fay had his own radio program, debuting in 1941. The variety show was broadcast on NBC Red.

== Later career ==
Frank Fay made a brief screen comeback in 1943 for the low-budget Monogram Pictures. He was teamed with comedian Billy Gilbert for a series of wartime comedies, but walked out after the opener, Spotlight Scandals. Fay was replaced by another comedian more congenial to Gilbert, Shemp Howard.

In 1944, Antoinette Perry cast Fay to star in the play Harvey, about an alcoholic and his friend Harvey, an invisible rabbit, which was his last Broadway success.

In 1951, he had third billing in the film Love Nest, remembered today as an early credit of Marilyn Monroe.

== Personal life ==
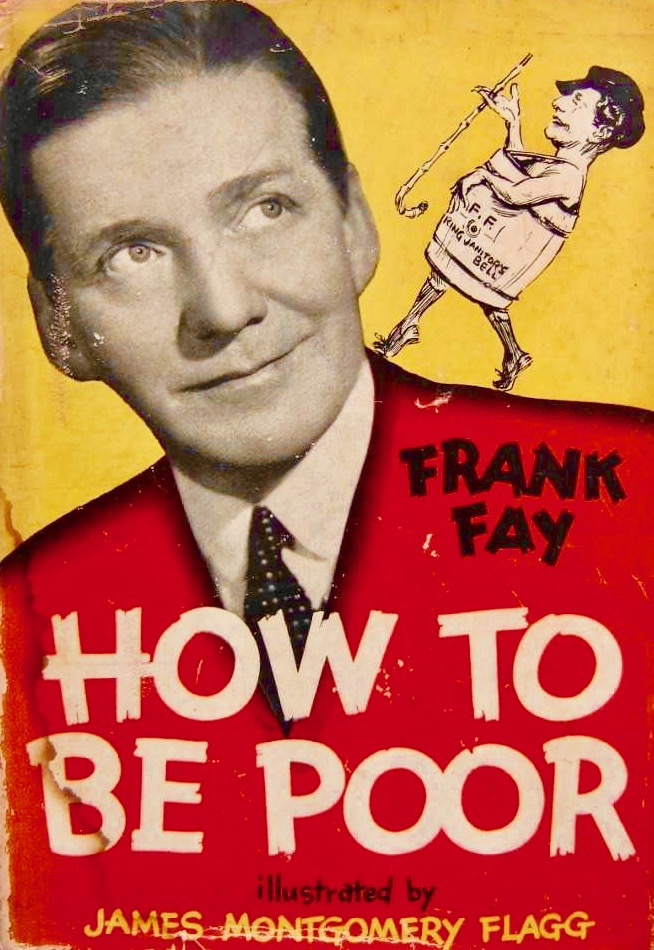
Frank Fay How To Be Poor, Prentice-Hall

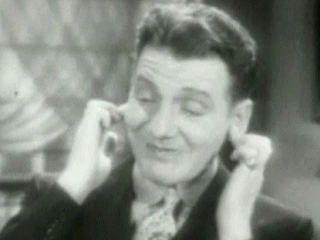
in The Stolen Jools (1931)

Fay married Barbara Stanwyck in 1928, when she was relatively unknown. He helped her further her career in films, and she was given a contract by Warner Bros. late in 1930. Their only film appearance together was a brief skit in the all-star fundraising short The Stolen Jools (1931). They adopted a son in 1932. The marriage reportedly soured when Fay's career was eclipsed by Stanwyck's success, and they divorced in 1935.

In 1945, Actors' Equity president Bert Lytell censured Fay for demanding that the association must investigate each member who supported the Spanish Refugee Appeal, or who criticized the Spanish Catholic Church for executing leftists, for un-American activity. The House Committee on Un-American Activities investigated those members.

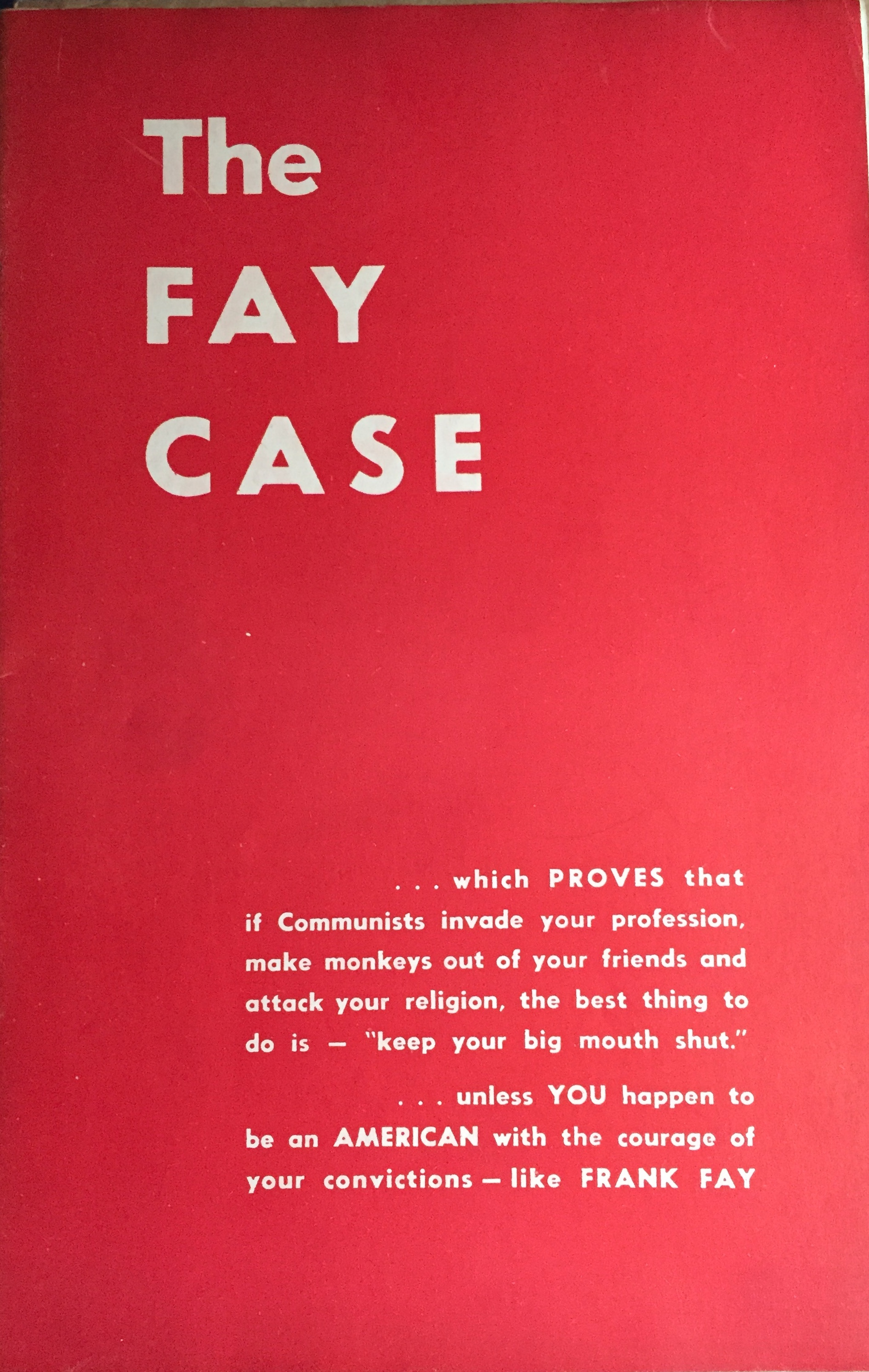
Joseph Peter Kamp, The Fay Case, Constitutional Educational League

In January 1946, just months after Nazi Germany had been defeated, a rally of white supremacists gathered at Madison Square Garden for a pro-Fascist event called "The Friends of Frank Fay", organized by Franco supporters and members of the Ku Klux Klan. The number of people attending the rally, in which the speakers also castigated communism, labor unions, and the legacy of the then-recently-deceased president Franklin D. Roosevelt, varied in estimation, with reported figures ranging from 18,000 to 20,000 people.

In the late 1950s Fay was declared legally incompetent. On September 20, 1961, he was admitted to St. John's Hospital in Santa Monica, California. He died there five days later, aged 69, of a ruptured abdominal aorta. Fay was buried in Calvary Cemetery in Los Angeles.

== Legacy ==
A Star Is Born (1937), starring Fredric March and Janet Gaynor, is thought to be an ironic portrayal of the real situation between Frank Fay and his recently divorced wife Barbara Stanwyck: the previously unknown wife shoots to stardom while her husband's career goes into sharp decline.

Fay has two stars on the Hollywood Walk of Fame.

== Filmography ==
| Year | Title | Role | Notes |
|---|---|---|---|
| 1929 | Show of Shows | Master of Ceremonies | |
| 1930 | Under a Texas Moon | Don Carlos | |
| 1930 | The Matrimonial Bed | Leopold Trebel | |
| 1930 | Bright Lights | Wally Dean | retitled as Adventures in Africa |
| 1931 | God's Gift to Women | Toto Duryea | |
| 1932 | A Fool's Advice | Spencer Brown | re-released as Meet the Mayor |
| 1935 | Stars Over Broadway | Announcer | |
| 1937 | Nothing Sacred | Master of Ceremonies | |
| 1940 | I Want a Divorce | Jefferson Anthony Gilman (Jeff) | |
| 1940 | They Knew What They Wanted | Father McKee | |
| 1943 | Spotlight Scandals | Frank Fay | |
| 1951 | Love Nest | Charles Kenneth 'Charley' Patterson | |
