= Sons O' Guns (film) =

1936 film by Lloyd Bacon

- Theatrical release poster
- Directed by: Lloyd Bacon
- Screenplay by: Jerry Wald; Julius J. Epstein
- Based on: Sons O' Guns; 1929 musical by John Frederick Coots, Arthur Swanstrom, Benny Davis, Frederick A. Thompson and Jack Donahue
- Produced by: Hal B. Wallis
- Starring: Joe E. Brown
- Cinematography: Sol Polito
- Edited by: James Gibbon
- Music by: Heinz Roemheld
- Production company: Warner Bros. Pictures
- Distributed by: Warner Bros. Pictures
- Release date: May 30, 1936
- Running time: 82 or 85 minutes
- Country: United States
- Language: English

Sons O' Guns is a 1936 American comedy film directed by Lloyd Bacon and written by Jerry Wald and Julius J. Epstein. It stars Joe E. Brown, and features Joan Blondell, with Beverly Roberts, Eric Blore, Craig Reynolds and Wini Shaw. It was released by Warner Bros. Pictures on May 30, 1936.

The film is based on a stage musical of the same name with book by Fred Thompson and Jack Donahue, music by J. Fred Coots, and lyrics by Arthur Swanstrom and Benny Davis, which played on Broadway for 295 performances beginning on November 26, 1929. Only one song from the stage production was used, "Over Here", the two other songs in the film – "Arms of an Army Man" and "A Buck and a Quarter a Day" – were written by Harry Warren and Al Dubin.

== Plot ==
Broadway musical star Jimmy Canfield prefers performing to fighting in World War I, to the distress of his fiancée Mary Harper, and her father, General Harper, who forbids Canfield from seeing his daughter unless he joins the Army. When Canfield finds out that Bernice Pierce is about to bring a breach of promise suit against him, he pretends to enlist to dodge the suit, but ends up actually in the Army by mistake. Sent to France, Buck private Canfield finds that his valet, Hobson is now his sergeant.

Canfield becomes friendly with Yvonne, a pretty French barmaid from the nearby café, after he protects her from the unwanted advances of an American officer, but Yvonne becomes jealous when Mary appears, pleased to see that Canfield is in the Army at last. Canfield denies to Yvonne that Mary is his girl, and takes her to a YMCA show, in which he performs. Bernice suddenly arrives from Paris to perform, and gives Canfield a passionate kiss, saying she's been looking all over France for him. Yvonne is jealous once again and storms out.

Canfield takes a room in Yvonne's house, unaware that her stepfather is a German spy. After he releases the spy's carrier pigeons, because they're keeping him awake, he is arrested and charged with espionage. He escapes from prison by disguising himself as an officer, but then is ordered to the front – as the officer – to capture a German machine gun emplacement. An artillery shell knocks him out and blows away his uniform, so he puts on a German pickelhaube helmet and is mistaken by the machine gunners as a German officer. He climbs into a German trench and puts on a German officer's greatcoat, ordering a retreat. He approaches the machine gun nest from the rear, and grabs their gun, using it to march them back to Allied lines. On a break, Canfield finds that the Germans are tired of fighting, so they escort him back to the German lines, where all the men in the German regiment want to follow him and give themselves up to the Allies. The Allies naturally think that they're witnessing a German attack, until the Germans hold up white flags.

Canfield himself, still wearing the German helmet and officer's coat, is arrested as a spy and a traitor. Mary and Bernice turn their backs on him, but Yvonne believes that he is innocent. Canfield is thrown into the guard house, where he is held until he can be shot, but when he is taken out, it is not for an execution, but to be rewarded by the French Army with the Legion of Honour and the Croix de Guerre for single-handedly capturing "hundreds and hundreds" of Germans. His final reward is a kiss from Yvonne.

== Cast ==
- Joe E. Brown as Jimmy Canfield
- Joan Blondell as Yvonne
- Beverly Roberts as Mary Harper
- Eric Blore as Hobson
- Craig Reynolds as Lieut. Burton
- Wini Shaw as Bernice Pearce
- Joseph King as General Harper
- Robert Barrat as Pierre
- G. P. Huntley Jr. as Capt. Ponsonby-Falcke
- Frank Mitchell as Ritter
- Bert Roach as Vogel
- David Worth as Arthur Travers
- Hans Joby as German prisoner
- Michael Mark as Carl
- Otto Fries as German spy
- Mischa Auer as German spy
