= Bright Lights (1930 film) =

1930 film

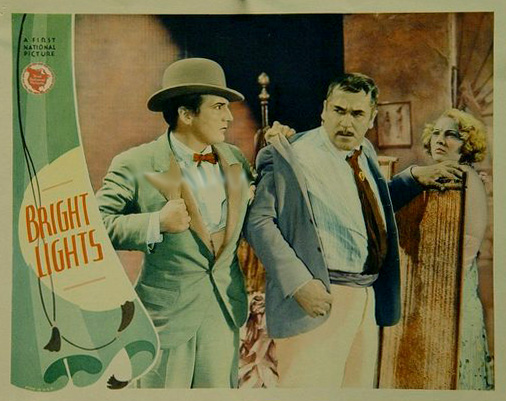
- Theatrical release poster
- Directed by: Michael Curtiz
- Written by: Scenario and dialogue: Henry McCarty; Humphrey Pearson
- Produced by: Robert North
- Starring: Dorothy Mackaill; Frank Fay; Noah Beery; Frank McHugh
- Cinematography: Lee Garmes; Charles Schoenbaum (Technicolor)
- Edited by: Harold Young
- Music by: Ned Washington; Ray Perkins; Herb Magidson; Grant Clarke; Harry Akst
- Production company: First National Pictures
- Distributed by: Warner Bros. Pictures
- Release date: July 4, 1930
- Running time: 73 minutes (7 Reels)
- Country: United States
- Language: English

Bright Lights, later retitled Adventures in Africa, is a 1930 American pre-Code musical comedy film produced and released by First National Pictures, a subsidiary of Warner Bros. Pictures. It premiered in Los Angeles in July 1930 but was edited and rereleased in early 1931. Although it was photographed entirely in Technicolor, the only surviving print is in black and white. The film stars Dorothy Mackaill, Frank Fay, Noah Beery and Frank McHugh. It also features the screen debut of John Carradine, who appears in a small, uncredited role.

== Plot ==
Bright Lights (1930)

Louanne, depicted as a successful actress, is giving her last performance before she retires to marry a rich man instead of the man whom she loves, Wally Dean. As she is interviewed by reporters, she tells a false story but remembers her troubled past through flashback sequences.

Louanne is shown as a dancer at a low-class café where Portuguese smuggler Miguel Parada attempts to force his attentions on her. With a riot about to start, she escapes with Wally. Another flashback shows Wally as a barker at a carnival with Louanne as a dancer. Wally again saves her from an imminent riot. Back in the present, Louanne continues to lie to the reporters and tell them about her genteel background.

Fish, one of the reporters, does not believe her story but says nothing. When Louanne returns to the stage to resume her performance, Miguel, who is in the audience, recognizes her and visits her dressing room because he has some "unfinished business" with her. Louanne is shocked to find him there. Wally soon appears and pretends that he has a gun in order to intimidate Miguel. He pretends to give the gun to Connie Lamont because he must take the stage. While Connie is guarding Miguel, a fight erupts and Miguel reveals that he has a real gun. In the struggle for the gun, Miguel is shot and killed.

When the police arrive, Wally tries to convince them that Miguel committed suicide to save Louanne from a scandal before her marriage. Louanne's friend Peggy also lies in order to save her. The police remain unconvinced until Fish also provides false testimony that he saw Miguel pull the trigger. Louanne is cleared and realizes that she really loves Wally. She cancels her engagement to her rich fiancé Fairchild and is united with Wally.

== Cast ==
- Dorothy Mackaill as Louanne
- Frank Fay as Wally Dean
- Noah Beery as Miguel Parada
- Daphne Pollard as Mame Avery
- James Murray as Connie Lamont
- Tom Dugan as Tom Avery
- Inez Courtney as Peggy North
- Frank McHugh as Fish, a reporter
- Edmund Breese as Harris
- Edward J. Nugent as "Windy" Jones
- Philip Strange as Fairchild

== Production ==
The project was first announced in the October 23, 1929 issue of Variety, with Lloyd Bacon named as director and Loretta Young, Nora Lane, William Austin and Anthony Bushell in the cast, none of whom remained with the project. In November, Michael Curtiz was announced as the director.

Principal photography was completed in early 1930. First National Pictures planned to release the film as a roadshow attraction, and it premiered on July 4, 1930, at the Warner Theatre in Los Angeles and at New York's Warner Strand Theatre in February 1931.

Writer Margaret Drennen filed a $25,000 copyright-infringement suit against the filmmakers, claiming that the film was based on her original story.

== Songs ==
- "Nobody Cares If I'm Blue", sung by Frank Fay, written by Harry Akst and Grant Clarke
- "I'm Crazy for Cannibal Love", sung by Dorothy Mackaill
- "Song of the Congo", sung by Mackaill, written by Al Bryan and Eddie Ward
- "Come Along!", sung by Fay
- "All the Pretty Girls I Know", sung by Fay
- "Wall Street", sung by Fay
- "I'm Sittin' Pretty"
- "Every Little Girl He Sees", sung by Inez Courtney
- "I'm Just a Man About Town", sung by Mackaill
- "You're an Eyeful of Heaven"

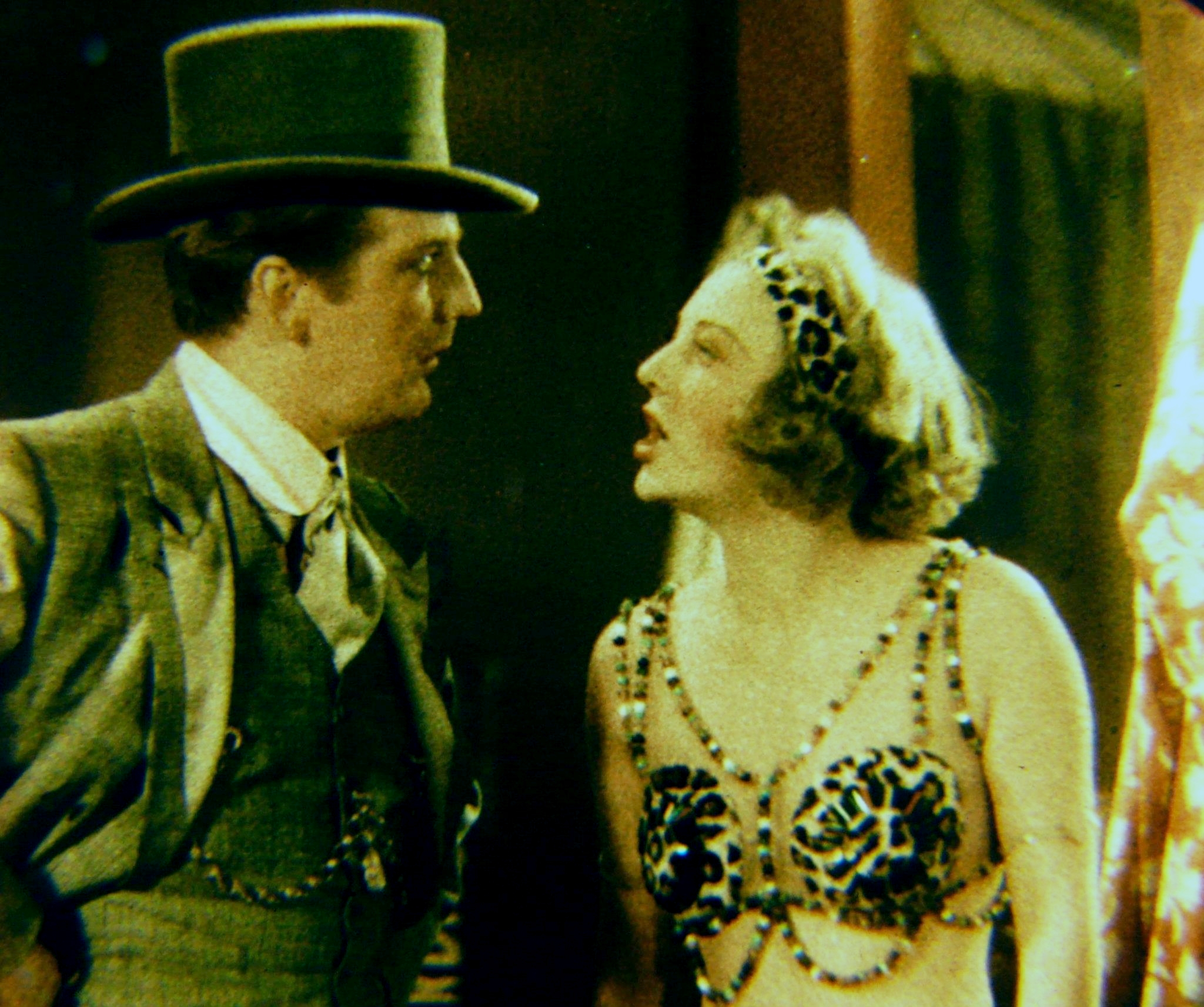
Recently discovered color fragment

== Reception ==
In a contemporary review for The New York Times, critic Mordaunt Hall wrote: "[The film] is weighted down with an inept story which never rises above the dime-novel level. ... Possibly there may be some who would appreciate Frank McHugh's impersonation of an inebriated reporter—that is, for a flash—but this continues so long that it seems hardly possible that the story is supposed to be compressed into one evening backstage. It seems years."

== Preservation status ==
Though the film was produced in Technicolor, only a black-and-white copy of the 1931 edited print (with some of the musical numbers cut) is known to have survived. A small fragment in the original Technicolor was recently discovered in the Library of Congress. In 2012, the film became available on DVD from the Warner Archive Collection in a double bill with another Dorothy Mackaill sound film, The Reckless Hour. A black-and-white copy is held by the Library of Congress.

== See also ==
- List of early color feature films
- List of incomplete or partially lost films
