= Party Husband =

1931 film

- Directed by: Clarence G. Badger
- Written by: Charles Kenyon (adaptation & dialogue)
- Based on: Party Husband by Geofrey Barnes
- Starring: Dorothy Mackaill
- Cinematography: Sidney Hickox
- Edited by: Frank Ware
- Production company: First National Pictures
- Distributed by: Warner Bros. Pictures
- Release date: June 6, 1931
- Running time: 73 minutes
- Country: United States
- Language: English

Party Husband is a 1931 American pre-Code comedy film produced by First National Pictures and released through their parent company Warner Bros. Pictures. It was directed by Clarence G. Badger and stars Dorothy Mackaill. It is preserved at the Library of Congress.

== Cast ==
- Dorothy Mackaill as Laura
- James Rennie as Jay Hogarth
- Dorothy Peterson as Kate
- Joe Donahue as Pat
- Donald Cook as Horace Purcell
- Helen Ware as Mrs. Duell
- Paul Porcasi as Henri Renard
- Mary Doran as Bee Canfield

Uncredited:

- Robert Allen
- Louise Beavers as Laura's maid
- Bill Elliott as Wedding party guest
- Gilbert Emery as Ben Holliday
- Barbara Weeks as Sally

== Home media ==
The film is offered on DVD as a double feature from Warner Archives along with another Mackaill Pre-Code feature, Office Wife.
