= The Mouthpiece =

1932 film

- theatrical release poster
- Directed by: James Flood; Elliott Nugent
- Written by: Earl Baldwin (adaptation & dialogue)
- Screenplay by: Joseph Jackson
- Based on: The Mouthpiece; 1929 play by Frank J. Collins
- Starring: Warren William; Sidney Fox; Aline MacMahon
- Cinematography: Barney McGill
- Edited by: George Amy
- Music by: Bernhard Kaun
- Production company: Warner Bros. Pictures
- Distributed by: Warner Bros. Pictures
- Release date: May 7, 1932
- Running time: 86 minutes
- Country: United States
- Language: English

The Mouthpiece is a 1932 American pre-Code crime drama film starring Warren William and directed by James Flood and Elliott Nugent. It was produced and distributed by Warner Bros. Pictures. The film is currently available on DVD in the Forbidden Hollywood series.

== Plot ==
Vincent Day is a prosecutor who is on the fast track to success. When a man he zealously prosecuted all the way to the electric chair is found to have been innocent, he becomes distressed and quits his job. At the suggestion of a friendly bartender, he decides to switch teams and become a defense attorney specializing in the representation of gangsters and other unsavory people. He will use any tactic to get his clients acquitted, up to and including drinking a slow-acting poison from a bottle of evidence to prove that the substance isn't lethal. The jury acquits the man not knowing that immediately after, Day rushes into a mob doctor's office for a pre-arranged stomach pump.

Celia Farraday is a young secretary recently arrived in the city from a small town in Kentucky. When Day makes play for her, she spurns his advances, loyal to her fiancé, Johnny. When the fiancé is framed for a crime committed by one of Day's clients, Day's affection for Celia not only prompts Day to defend Johnny by implicating his client in the crime, but to reconsider his life of getting criminals out of jail sentences. However, his associates send him a message that his departure will not be allowed. He lets them know that he has all of their secrets in a safe-deposit box, along with instructions for the bank to forward the contents to the District Attorney in the event of his unnatural death. They call his bluff and he is shot while leaving his office to attend Celia's wedding. On the way to the hospital, he tells his faithful secretary that the criminals were wrong to call his bluff and that the information will be on the way to the DA. The movie leaves it ambiguous whether Day, shot several times, will survive his wounds.

== Cast ==
- Warren William as Vincent Day
- Sidney Fox as Celia Farraday
- Aline MacMahon as Miss Hickey
- John Wray as Mr. Barton
- Mae Madison as Elaine
- Ralph Ince as J. B. Roscoe
- Morgan Wallace as E. A. Smith
- Guy Kibbee as Bartender
- J. Carrol Naish as Tony Rocco
- Walter Walker as District Attorney Forbes
- Stanley Fields as Mr. Pondapolis
- Murray Kinnell as Thompson
- Noel Francis as Miss DeVere
- Jack LaRue as Joe Garland (uncredited)
- William Janney as Johnny Morris

== Production ==
Elliott Nugent was a writer and actor who had just written a Broadway flop when he received an offer to direct The Mouthpiece at Warners. Nugent wrote, "A youngish man named James Flood was assigned as my co-director. He had directed silent pictures but had never done a talkie. The understanding was that I was in charge of rehearsing the actors and okaying the take to be used, and Flood was in charge of the camera setups. This arrangement worked out very well, and Flood and I hit it off nicely."

== Reception ==
The film "found a tremendous audience among Depression era movie- goers" Nugent said "the picture made Warren William a star" and led to Nugent and Flood being assigned another movie, Life Begins.

On the review aggregator website Rotten Tomatoes, 94% of 35 critics' reviews are positive. The website's consensus reads: "Putting Warren William on the stand and finding him guilty of marvelous charisma, The Mouthpiece is a superb acting showcase that has a ball with bad behavior in the courtroom."

== Other adaptations ==
The play Mouthpiece was adapted again in 1940 as The Man Who Talked Too Much starring George Brent. This adaptation has a different ending.

A third adaptation was released in 1955 as Illegal starring Edward G. Robinson.
