= Just Another Blonde =

1926 film

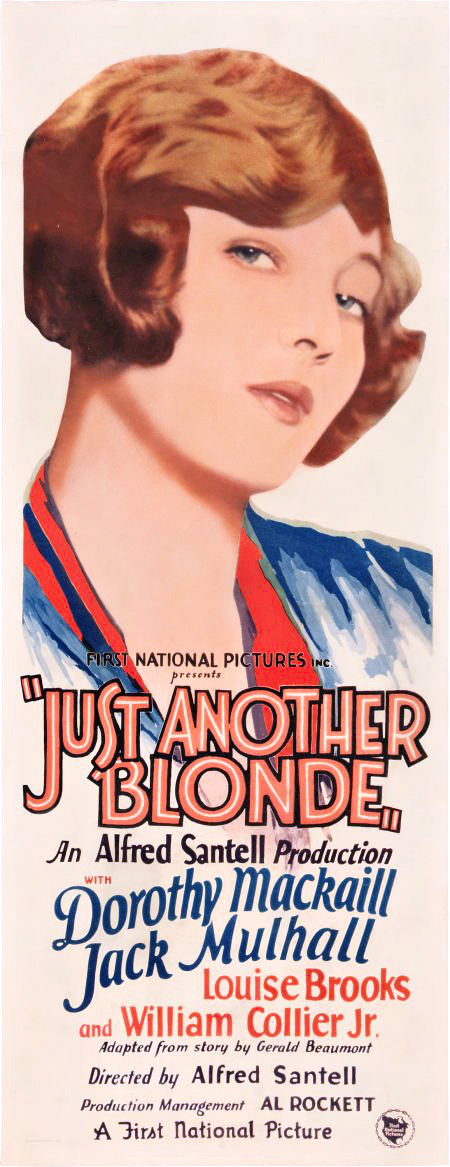
- Film poster
- Directed by: Alfred Santell
- Written by: Paul Schofield (scenario); George Marion Jr. (intertitles)
- Based on: "Even Stephen" by Gerald Beaumont
- Produced by: Al Rocket
- Starring: Dorothy Mackaill; Jack Mulhall; Louise Brooks
- Cinematography: Arthur Edeson
- Edited by: Hugh Bennett
- Production company: First National
- Distributed by: First National Pictures
- Release date: December 13, 1926
- Running time: 60 minutes
- Country: United States
- Language: Silent (English intertitles)

Surviving footage from Just Another Blonde

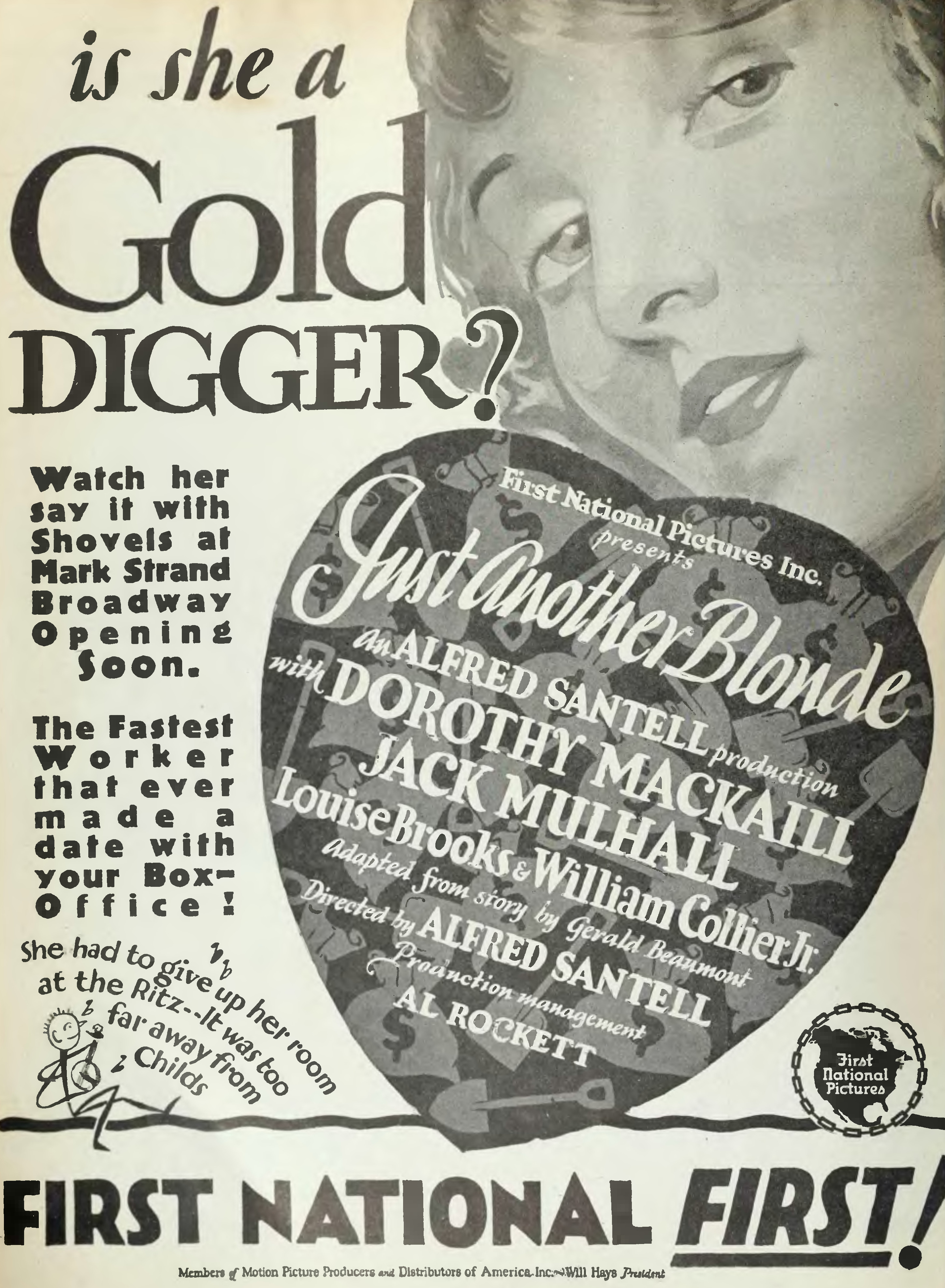
Just Another Blonde ad in The Film Daily, 1926

Just Another Blonde (also known as The Girl From Coney Island) is a 1926 American silent romantic comedy/adventure film distributed by First National Pictures. Based on the short story "Even Stephen" by Gerald Beaumont, the film was directed by Alfred Santell and stars Dorothy Mackaill, Jack Mulhall, and Louise Brooks.

Just Another Blonde was shot in part on location at Coney Island's original Luna Park, with characters in the film, such as Blackie played by Louise Brooks, playing a shooting gallery attendant.

== Cast ==
- Dorothy Mackaill as Jeanne Cavanaugh
- Jack Mulhall as Jimmy O'Connor
- Louise Brooks as Diana O'Sullivan
- William Collier Jr. as Kid Scotty
- Betty Byrne as a nurse (uncredited)
- Effie Shannon as Jimmy’s mother (uncredited)

== Preservation ==
A trailer and an incomplete print of Just Another Blonde is preserved at the UCLA Film & Television Archive.

In 2026, Flicker Alley released Focus on Louise Brooks. It contained surviving footage from Just Another Blonde, including segments from five of the original six reels as well as the film's original trailer.

== See also ==
- List of incomplete or partially lost films
