= The Office Wife (1930 film) =

1930 film

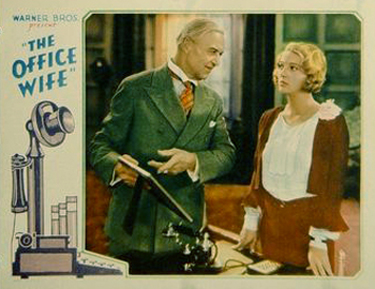
- Cinema card showing Hobart Bosworth and Dorothy Mackaill
- Directed by: Lloyd Bacon
- Written by: Charles Kenyon
- Based on: The Office Wife; 1930 novel by Faith Baldwin
- Starring: Dorothy Mackaill; Lewis Stone; Natalie Moorhead; Joan Blondell; Hobart Bosworth
- Cinematography: William Rees
- Edited by: George Marks
- Music by: Alois Reiser
- Production company: Warner Bros. Pictures
- Distributed by: Warner Bros. Pictures
- Release date: August 23, 1930 (US)
- Running time: 59 minutes
- Country: United States
- Language: English

The Office Wife is a 1930 American pre-Code romantic drama film directed by Lloyd Bacon, released by Warner Bros. Pictures, and based on the novel of the same name by Faith Baldwin. It was the talkie debut for Joan Blondell who would become one of the major Warner Bros. stars for the following nine years.

== Plot ==
The film.

Publisher Larry Fellowes believes that Andrews, his stenographer/secretary, spends more time with him and makes more decisions than a wife would for her husband. He persuades author Kate Halsey to write a novel based on this premise.

When Andrews learns of Larry's plans to marry Linda, the secretary has a nervous breakdown because she is in love with him herself. A new attractive, intelligent and efficient secretary, Anne Murdock, is hired while Larry is on his honeymoon. Larry, a workaholic, begins to neglect his wife working with his secretary, and they both fall in love. Meanwhile, his wife is seeing another man, with whom she falls in love.

Eventually, Larry kisses Anne while they are working together at his apartment, while Linda makes love with her young gigolo, who gives her the key to his apartment and says goodnight. Linda returns to her husband (after giving them enough time to compose themselves) and tells Larry that they should go to bed as it is very late. Anne watches as Larry goes to the bedroom with his wife and closes the door behind him. She is heartbroken and decides she will give him her resignation in the morning.

Linda decides to divorce Larry. Anne agrees to marry her long-time admirer Ted O'Hara after giving her resignation. On the final day of work, Anne's sister Katherine Murdock phones the confused Larry and explains everything, bringing about a happy ending.

== Cast ==
- Dorothy Mackaill as Anne Murdock
- Lewis Stone as Larry Fellowes
- Natalie Moorhead as Linda Fellowes
- Hobart Bosworth as J.P. McGowan
- Joan Blondell as Katherine Murdock
- Blanche Friderici as Kate Halsey
- Brooks Benedict as Jameson
- Dale Fuller as Secretary Andrews
- Walter Merrill as Ted O'Hara

Cast notes:

- Dickie Moore makes a cameo appearance in the scene by the pool.

== Preservation status ==
The film survives intact, preserved by the Library of Congress.

== Home media ==
The film was released on DVD from Warner Archive made-on-demand as a double bill with Dorothy Mackaill's Party Husband.
