= A Fool's Advice =

1932 film directed by Ralph Ceder

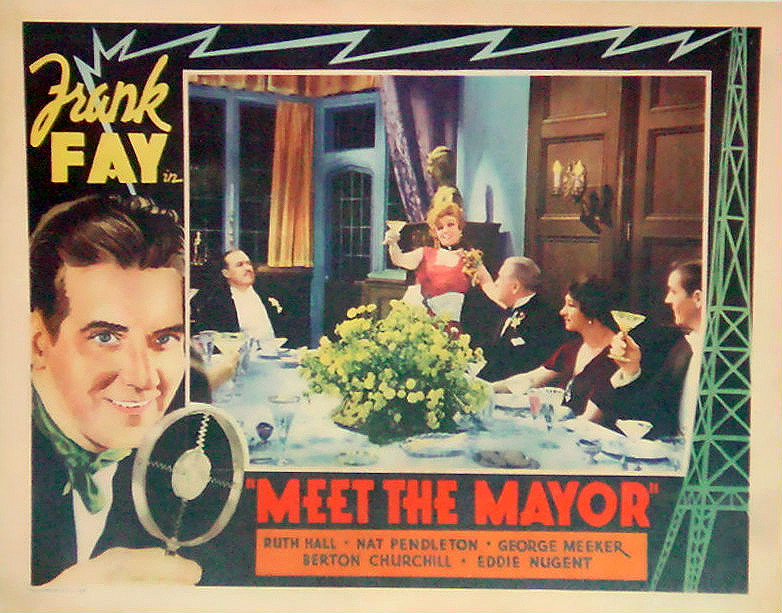
- Lobby card
- Directed by: Ralph Ceder
- Written by: Charles Belden; Walter DeLeon; Frank Fay (story)
- Produced by: Frank Fay (uncredited)
- Starring: See below
- Cinematography: William Rees
- Edited by: W. Donn Hayes
- Music by: Edward Ward
- Production company: Frank Fay Productions
- Distributed by: Warner Bros. Pictures
- Release date: February 20, 1932
- Running time: 63 minutes
- Country: United States
- Language: English

A Fool's Advice is a 1932 American pre-Code film directed by Ralph Ceder. The film is also known as His Honor the Mayor (American alternative title) and Meet the Mayor (American reissue title). It was produced by its star, Frank Fay, and released by Warner Bros. Pictures.

== Cast ==
- Frank Fay as Spencer Brown
- Nat Pendleton as Kelly - Naughty Boy
- Edward J. Nugent as Steve
- Ruth Hall as Norma Baker
- Berton Churchill as Mayor Martin Sloan
- George Meeker as Harry Bayliss
- Hale Hamilton as George Diamond
- Esther Howard as Miss Prescott
- Franklin Pangborn as Egbert - Hotel Clerk
- Mike Donlin as Mr. Wimple
- Eddie Borden as Catlett
- Al Hill as Kelly's Henchman

== 1937 reissue ==
A Fool's Advice was re-released as Meet the Mayor. Frank Fay had a terrible reputation in show business, owing to an exceptionally large ego and a history of abusing people verbally and physically. Warner Bros. declined to handle the reissue of A Fool's Advice, but did agree to refilm the title sequence. These new credits reflect the low regard Fay's professional colleagues had for him: his name appears in the smallest possible type as both star and author, with the supporting cast members' names more than twice the size of Fay's.
