= The Matrimonial Bed =

1930 film

- Lobby card showing Florence Eldridge and Lilyan Tashman
- Directed by: Michael Curtiz
- Written by: Harvey F. Thew (dialogue)
- Screenplay by: Harvey F. Thew; Seymour Hicks
- Based on: The Matrimonial Bed; 1927 play by Seymour Hicks which was based on Au premier de ces messieurs French play by André Mouëzy-Éon; Yves Mirande
- Starring: Frank Fay; Lilyan Tashman; Florence Eldridge; Beryl Mercer; Arthur Edmund Carewe; Vivien Oakland; James Gleason
- Cinematography: Devereaux Jennings
- Edited by: Jack Killifer
- Music by: Louis Silvers; Song: "Fleur d'amour" by Sidney Mitchell; George W. Meyer; Archie Gottler (words and music)
- Production company: Warner Bros. Pictures
- Distributed by: Warner Bros. Pictures
- Release date: August 2, 1930 (United States)
- Running time: 69 minutes
- Country: United States
- Language: English

The Matrimonial Bed is a 1930 American pre-Code comedy film produced and released by Warner Bros. Pictures. Directed by Michael Curtiz, it was based on the French play by André Mouëzy-Éon and Yves Mirande. The English version of the play, by Sir Seymour Hicks, opened in New York on October 12, 1927, and had 13 performances.

In the United Kingdom, the film is known as A Matrimonial Problem.

== Plot ==
Leopold Trebel is a man who was in a train wreck five years earlier and was taken for dead by his wife, Juliet. Leopold and Juliet have both remarried. Leopold, who remembers nothing that occurred before the train wreck, is the father of two sets of twins by his new wife, Sylvaine. Juliet has recently had a child with her new husband, Gustave Corton. Leopold is a very popular hairdresser and some of Juliet's friends urge her to try him out.

When Leopold shows up at her home, he shocks the servants and his ex-wife. A doctor manages to restore Leopold's memory through hypnosis but in the process makes him forget what has happened in the last five years. When Leopold awakes from hypnosis, he thinks he has only been unconscious for a short while. He assumes he is still Juliet's husband. The doctor warns everyone not to tell him the truth because the shock could kill him. Just at this crucial moment, Gustave Corton arrives home and is shocked to find Leopold in his bed. Later on, Sylvaine arrives only to find her husband in bed with Gustave Corton. Eventually, Leopold learns what has happened and asks the doctor to pretend to take back his memory so that Juliet, whom he deeply loves, can continue to live her new life.

== Cast ==
- Frank Fay as Adolphe Noblet/Leopold Trebel
- Lilyan Tashman as Sylvaine
- James Gleason as Gustave Corton
- Beryl Mercer as Corinne
- Marion Byron as Marianne
- Vivian Oakland as Suzanne Trebel
- Arthur Edmund Carew as Dr. Friedland
- James Bradbury Sr. as Chabonnais
- Florence Eldridge as Juliette
- Flora Finch as Vosin

== Allusions to homosexuality ==
The film has numerous gay jokes revolving around the character of the hairdresser/husband Leopold.

Leopold is discovered in bed with Gustave, and Sylvaine assumes they are having an affair and, shocked, exclaims: "What kind of a house is this?"

When the doctor attempts to examine Leopold, the other assumes the doctor is gay and refuses to take off his shirt. When the doctor turns off the light to hypnotize him, Leopold exclaims that he was right in his suspicions about him.

The movie has numerous gay jokes as the hairdresser/husband played by Leopold. Actor Frank Fay camps up the hairdresser persona to differentiate himself from the personality of the husband. There are lines like "I may be a hairdresser but that doesn't mean I hold men's hands". When he asks what manner of person was he as the hairdresser, he is told, "You were gay, a bit dandified."

== Preservation ==
A print is held in the Library of Congress collection.
