= Waterfront (1928 film) =

1928 film by William A. Seiter

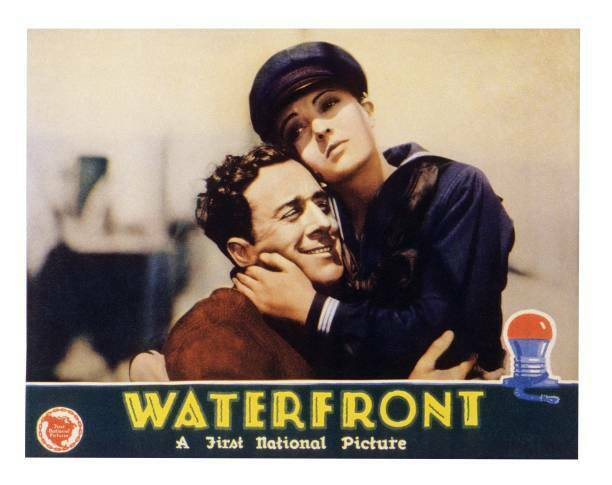
- Directed by: William A. Seiter
- Written by: Will Chapel (story); Thomas J. Geraghty; Gertrude Orr; Casey Robinson
- Produced by: Ned Marin
- Starring: Dorothy Mackaill; Jack Mulhall
- Cinematography: Lee Garmes
- Edited by: John Rawlins
- Music by: Gerard Carbonara; A. Cousiminer; W. Franke Harling; Joseph Kaestner; Clifford Vaughan
- Distributed by: First National Pictures
- Release date: September 16, 1928
- Running time: 7 reels
- Country: United States
- Language: Sound (Synchronized) (English Intertitles)

Waterfront is a 1928 American synchronized sound comedy drama film released with sound effects and music, produced and released by First National Pictures. While the film has no audible dialog, it was released with a synchronized musical score with sound effects using the sound-on-disc Vitaphone process. The film was directed by William A. Seiter and starred Dorothy Mackaill and Jack Mulhall, then a popular duo under the First National banner.

== Plot ==
Peggy Ann Andrews, a self-sufficient and lively young woman, lives with her father, Captain John Andrews, in a cozy home perched at the end of a pier. Her life is rooted in the rhythms of the waterfront, where her father commands a tugboat.

One day, while returning home, Captain Andrews is so distracted waving to Peggy Ann that he nearly collides with a passing tramp steamer. On board is Jack Dowling, a cheerful oiler, and his friend “Oilcan” Olsen. The two men jokingly tease the old captain about the near miss, which infuriates him. However, Jack is immediately struck by Peggy Ann’s beauty and secretly sneaks ashore to get a closer look. When the Captain spots him, he throws Jack off the pier. Undeterred, Jack manages to signal Peggy Ann and persuades her to meet him that evening for a dance. She agrees—on the condition he keeps his distance from the pier, as her father remains furious.

At the dance hall, Jack’s romantic plans are interrupted by Brute Mullins, a roughneck who is also in love with Peggy Ann. A brawl ensues, but Jack, with help from Oilcan Olsen, escapes with Peggy Ann. During their walk home, Jack attempts to kiss her. Offended, Peggy Ann rejects his advance and tells him to stay away.

Back home, Captain Andrews, growing increasingly uneasy about the harbor life, announces that they will leave the waterfront and move inland to a farm. Peggy Ann is dismayed—she loves the vitality and freedom of the waterfront and has no interest in rural life.

The next day, Jack visits her again at the ferryboat where she runs a newsstand. Still drawn to him, Peggy Ann forgives him, and when he proposes marriage, she accepts—until he suggests that they settle on a farm. Outraged, she breaks off the engagement and rushes home to tell her father.

Learning that Jack wants to live on a farm, Captain Andrews begins to view the young man more favorably. He conspires with Jack to convince Peggy Ann to give up the sea. As part of the plan, Jack persuades her to stow away aboard the tramp steamer, claiming it’s the only way for them to be together and escape her father's farm. Peggy Ann agrees and hides in a lifeboat, only to be quickly discovered and put to work peeling potatoes in the galley.

Jack soon “rescues” her—but Peggy Ann notices the ship hasn’t left the dock. Realizing she’s been tricked, she turns on him in anger. At that moment, Brute Mullins appears and attacks Jack. As the two men fight, Peggy Ann watches, torn.

Suddenly, she understands her feelings: she loves Jack, even if it means giving up the harbor for a new life. She stops the fight and embraces him, choosing love and the farm life over her former independence.

== Cast ==
- Dorothy Mackaill as Peggy Ann Andrews
- Jack Mulhall as Jack Dowling
- James Bradbury Sr. as Peter Seastrom
- Knute Erickson as Captain John Andrews
- Ben Hendricks Jr. as Oilcan Olson
- William Bailey as Brute Mullin
- Pat Harmon as Oiler

== Music ==
The film featured a theme song that was entitled "I Love You Dear" which was written by Gerard Carbonara.

== Preservation status ==
The new Library of Congress database shows a print surviving complete at Cineteca Italiana in Milan. The complete soundtrack survives on Vitaphone discs at UCLA.
