= Sons O' Guns =

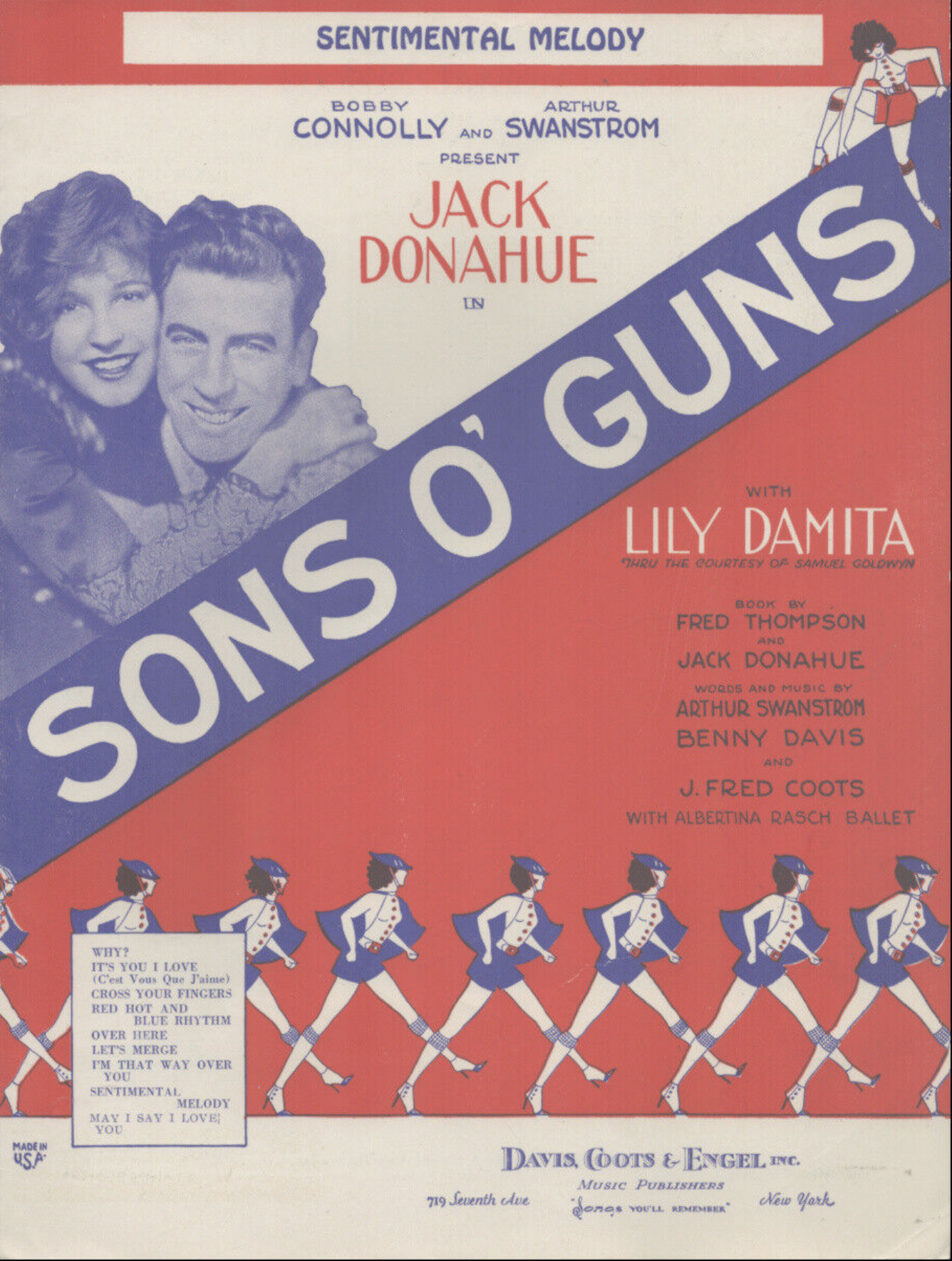
Front cover of 1929 sheet music for Sons O' Guns. Pictured in the upper left are the musical's stars Jack Donahue and Lili Damita.

Sons O' Guns is a musical in two acts with music by J. Fred Coots; lyrics co-authored by Arthur Swanstrom and Benny Davis; and a book co-written by Frederick A. Thompson and Jack Donahue. Donahue also starred in the original production as the central character of Jimmy Canfield, an American playboy who is forced to enlist in the United States Army during World War I and has a series of comic adventures and a romance in France.

== Plot ==
The musical takes place in Rhode Island and in France during the years 1918-1919. The show opens in the United States where Canfield and his servant Hobson enjoy a privileged life of luxury and fun which is interrupted when they are enforced into enlisting into the United States Army during the first World War. who is with his master as a fellow enlisted serviceman. The pair have a series of misadventures all played for light hearted comic effect rather than serious drama on the Western Front in France; including being mistakenly accused of being German spies with Canfield being arrested. The musical also follows a central Romance between Canfield and the French girl Yvonne. All ends happily in the end.

== History ==
Sons O' Guns premiered on Broadway at the Imperial Theatre on November 26, 1929. A success, it ran there for a total of 295 performances; closing on August 9, 1930. The production was co-produced by Swanstrom and Bobby Connolly; the latter of whom directed the show. Several Austrian-American creatives were on the production team for musical: including conductor Max Steiner as musical director, dancer Albertina Rasch as choreographer, and artist Joseph Urban as scenic designer. Charles LeMaire designed the costumes for the production. When lyricist and producer Arthur Swanstrom died in 1940, his obituary in Variety stated it was the most significant work in his career.

The cast was led by Jack Donahue as Jimmy Canfield, William Frawley as Hobson, and Lili Damita as Yvonne. Others in the show included David Hutcheson as both Major Archibald and Ponsonby-Falcke, Milton Watson as Arthur Travers, Shirley Vernon as Mary Harper, Richard Temple as General Harper, Mary Horan as Bernice Pearce, Raoul De Tisne as Pierre, Robert Dohn as Parker, Alfred Bardelang as Oswald, Frances Markey as Colette, Gwendolyn Milne as Jeanette, and Marion Chambers as Joan. The show is best remembered for its songs "Why?" and "Cross Your Fingers".

The musical was adapted into the 1936 film Sons O' Guns.
