= The Play Girl =

1928 film

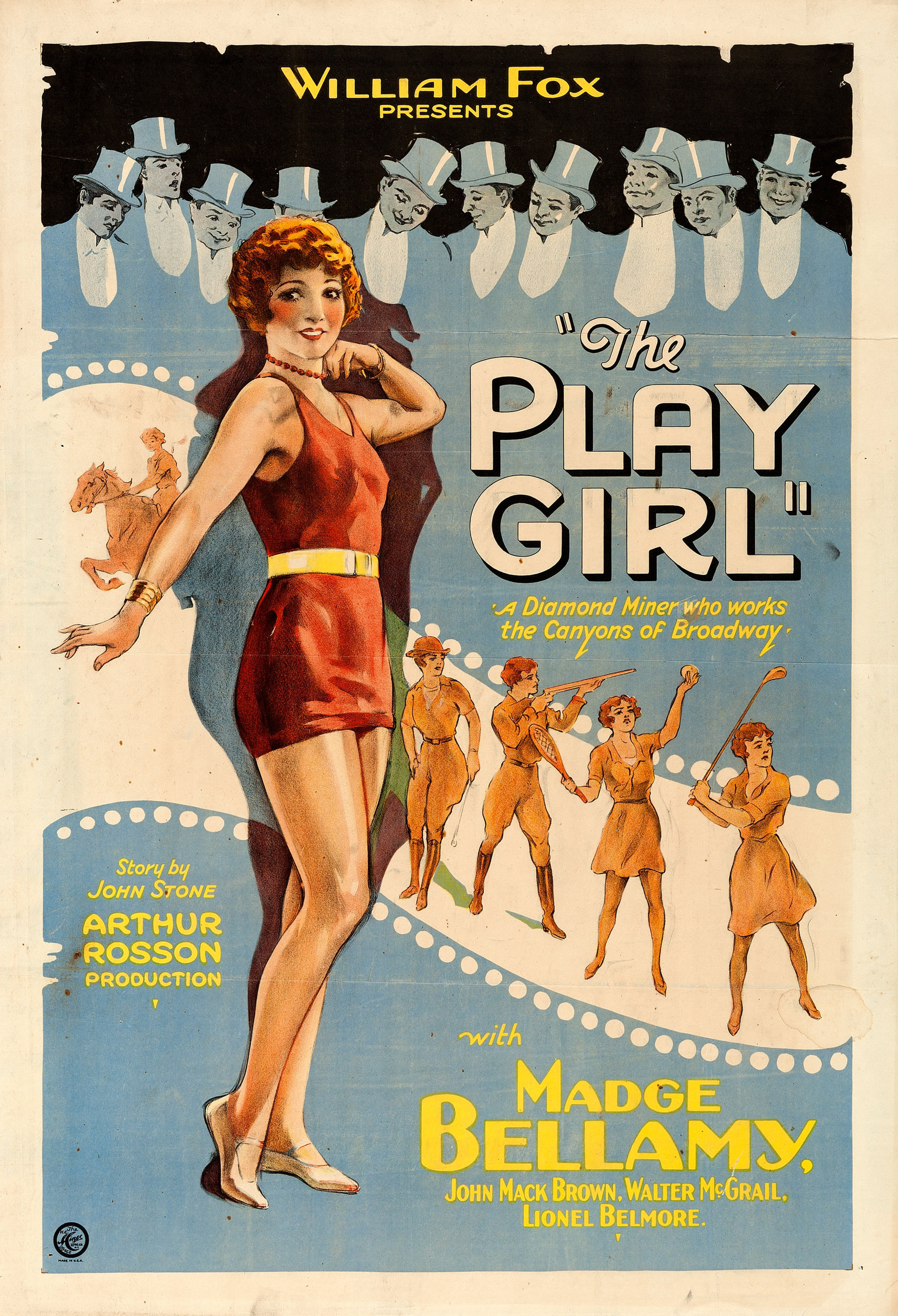
- Film poster
- Directed by: Arthur Rosson
- Written by: John Stone; Reggie Morris; Norman Z. McLeod
- Produced by: William Fox
- Starring: Madge Bellamy; Johnny Mack Brown; Walter McGrail
- Cinematography: Rudolph J. Bergquist
- Edited by: Ralph Dietrich
- Production company: Fox Film
- Distributed by: Fox Film
- Release date: April 22, 1928
- Running time: 60 minutes
- Country: United States
- Language: Silent (English intertitles)

The Play Girl is a 1928 American silent romantic comedy film directed by Arthur Rosson and starring Madge Bellamy, Johnny Mack Brown, and Walter McGrail.

== Plot summary ==
When Madge, a clerk in a flower shop, is sent to a bachelor's apartment to deliver and arrange a bouquet, she discovers a guest, young and handsome Bradley Lane, taking a bath. She loses her job and becomes a playgirl until Bradley, her true love, asks her to marry him.

== Cast ==
- Madge Bellamy as Madge Norton
- Johnny Mack Brown as Bradley Lane
- Walter McGrail as David Courtney
- Lionel Belmore as The Greek Florist
- Anita Garvin as Millie
- Thelma Hill as The Salesgirl
- Harry Tenbrook as The Chauffeur
- Mae Madison as Flapper
- Bertram Marburgh as Socialite

== Production ==
The film was marred by two deaths of crew members over a period of about two weeks. Studio electrician Thomas Rafferty was killed in a fall, and cinematographer Rudolph Bergquist died in an automobile accident on Santa Monica Boulevard in Los Angeles while driving a studio car.

== Reception ==
Motion Picture Herald critic T.O. Service bluntly wrote, "I think 'The Play Girl' is bad," finding it clichéd, and blaming the poor reception on having seen a better film beforehand (Soft Living) and due to "suffering...from an overdose of Bellamy."

Laurence Reid of Motion Picture News called it "interesting and fairly amusing," despite the film having "no plot at all." However, Reid praised Madge Bellamy for "[doing] her bit in making it enjoyable."

== Preservation ==
With no prints of The Play Girl located in any film archives, it is a lost film.

A manuscript listing each scene is preserved in the Library of Congress.

== Bibliography ==
- Solomon, Aubrey. The Fox Film Corporation, 1915-1935: A History and Filmography. McFarland, 2011.
