= Expensive Women =

1931 film

- Lobby poster
- Directed by: Hobart Henley
- Written by: Adaptation: Harry F. Thew, Raymond Griffith; Dialogue: Arthur Caesar (uncredited)
- Based on: Passionate Sonata (1931 novel) by Wilson Collison
- Starring: Dolores Costello
- Cinematography: William Rees
- Edited by: Desmond O'Brien
- Production company: Warner Bros. Pictures
- Distributed by: Warner Bros. Pictures
- Release date: October 24, 1931 (US)
- Running time: 60 minutes
- Country: United States
- Language: English

Expensive Women is a 1931 American pre-Code drama film produced and distributed by Warner Bros. Pictures. The film was directed by silent film veteran Hobart Henley and stars Dolores Costello. It was Costello's final film as a leading lady and star for Warners, which she had been since 1925. She retired to be the wife of John Barrymore and to raise their family. Costello would return to films five years later after a long hiatus and the end of her marriage to Barrymore, but never regained the luster she enjoyed as a Warners star.

A print is preserved in the Library of Congress collection.

== Plot ==
Constance Newton attends a party with her friend Bobby Brandon, and falls in love with another party guest, composer Neil Hartley. She leaves the party with Neil, spending the night at his apartment. Bobby finds out about it, but fickle Constance soon falls for married man Arthur Raymond, one of Neil's students. Arthur tells Constance he's in the process of getting a divorce, but the divorce falls through. Later when Constance and Bobby attend a party, he is murdered by Arthur but Constance is blamed as the suspect.

== Cast ==
- Dolores Costello as Constance "Connie" Newton
- H. B. Warner as Melville Raymond
- Warren William as Neil Hartley
- Anthony Bushell as Arthur Raymond
- Polly Walters as Molly Lane
- Joe Donahue as Bobby Brandon
- George Irving as Melville's friend
- Billy House as George Allison

Uncredited

- Allan Lane as partier
- Mae Madison as Irene
- Margaret Mann
- Cliff Saum as Taxi driver
- Morgan Wallace as Young man
- Adele Watson as Martha, Connie's maid
