= Dorothy Mackaill =

British-American actress (1903–1990)

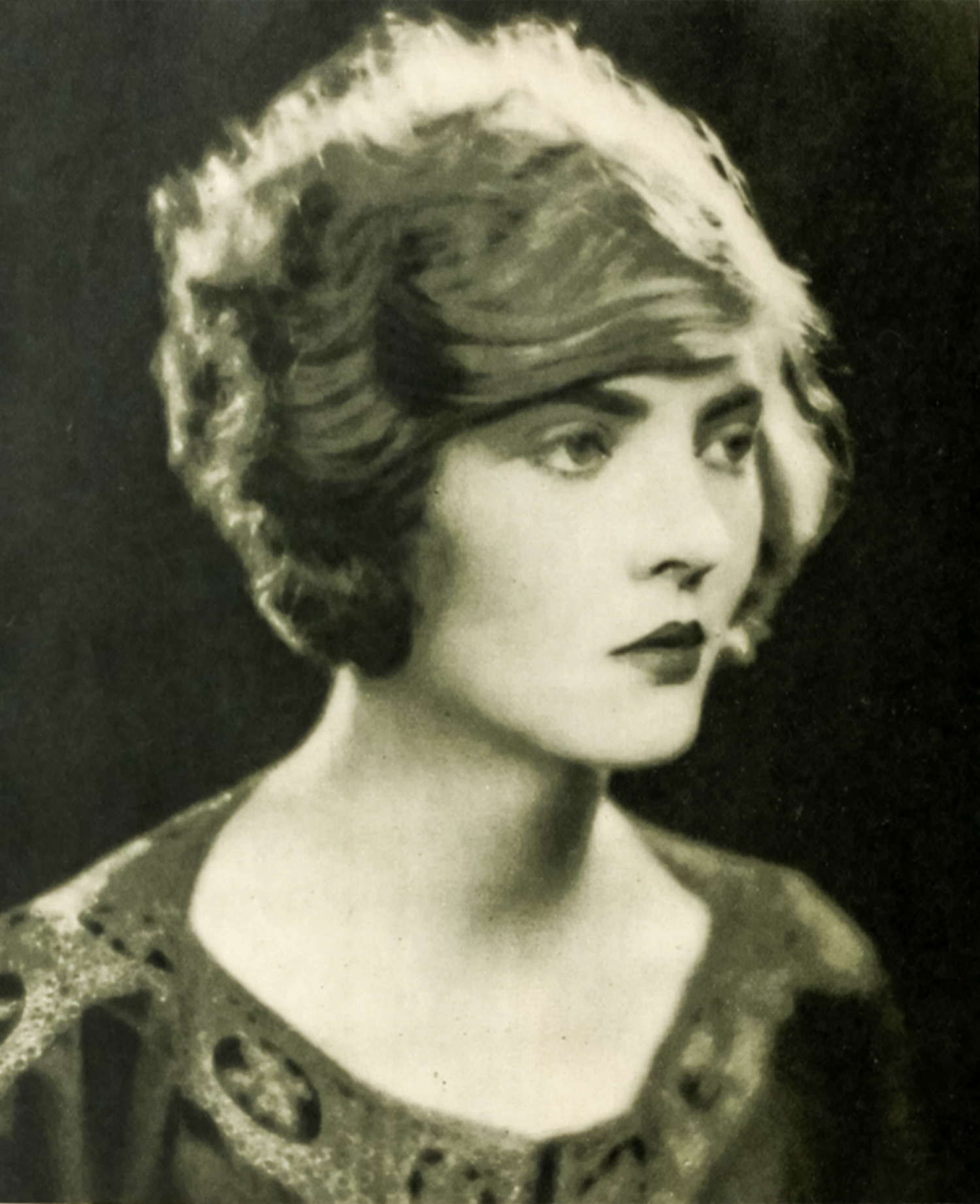
- Publicity photo of Mackaill from Stars of the Photoplay, 1924
- Born: March 4, 1903; Kingston upon Hull, England, UK
- Died: August 12, 1990 (aged 87); Honolulu, Hawaii, U.S.
- Citizenship: British; American
- Occupation: Actress
- Years active: 1920–1937; 1976–1980
- Spouse(s): Lothar Mendes (m. 1926; div. 1928) Neil Miller (m. 1931; div. 1934) Harold Patterson (m. 1947; div. 1948)

Dorothy Mackaill (March 4, 1903 – August 12, 1990) was a British-American actress, most active during the silent-film era and into the pre-Code era of the early 1930s.

== Early life ==
Mackaill was born at 20 Newstead Street in the Dukeries, Kingston upon Hull, in 1903. She was raised by her father, who owned a dance academy, after her parents separated when she was around eleven years old. She attended nearby Thoresby Primary School, where she is commemorated with a blue plaque, and one of the four school houses is named after her.

In one account of her teenage years, Mackaill ran away to London to pursue a stage career as an actress. Another version of this period of her life describes Mackaill as teaching a Saturday evening dancing class at her father's academy when her talent was recognised by visitors who persuaded her father to send her to London to learn elocution and dancing. This she did at the Thorne Academy of Dramatic Art and Dancing in Wigmore Hall, attending the first year of a two-year course before leaving to start her paid career.

At age 16, Mackaill danced in Joybelles at London's Hippodrome and worked in Paris acting in a few minor Pathé films. She met a Broadway stage choreographer who persuaded her to migrate to New York City at 17, where she became active in the Ziegfeld Follies, dancing in his Midnight Frolic revue.

== Career ==
By 1920, Mackaill had begun making the transition from "Follies Girl" to film actress. That same year she appeared in her first film, a Wilfred Noy-directed mystery, The Face at the Window. Mackaill also appeared in several comedies of 1920 opposite actor Johnny Hines. In 1921, she appeared opposite Anna May Wong, Noah Beery and Lon Chaney in the Marshall Neilan-directed drama Bits of Life. In the following years, Mackaill would appear opposite such popular actors as Richard Barthelmess, Rod La Rocque, Colleen Moore, John Barrymore, George O'Brien, Bebe Daniels, Milton Sills and Anna Q. Nilsson.

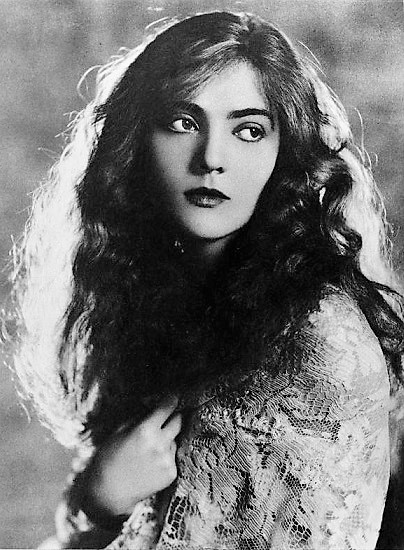
Dorothy Mackaill, c. 1920

Mackaill rose to leading-lady status in the drama The Man Who Came Back (1924), opposite rugged matinee idol George O'Brien. In 1924, she also starred in the western film The Mine with the Iron Door, shot on location outside of Tucson, Arizona. That same year, the Western Association of Motion Picture Advertisers of the United States presented Mackaill with one of its WAMPAS Baby Stars awards, which each year honored thirteen young women whom the association believed to be on the threshold of movie stardom. Other notable recipients of the award in 1924 were Clara Bow, Julanne Johnston and Lucille Ricksen. Her career continued to flourish throughout the remainder of the 1920s, as she made a smooth transition to sound with the part-talkie The Barker (1928).

=== Later career and retirement ===
In September 1928, First National Pictures was acquired by Warner Bros., and her contract with First National was not renewed in 1931. Her most memorable role of this era was the 1932 Columbia Pictures B film release Love Affair (1932) with a then little-known Humphrey Bogart as her leading man. She made several films for MGM, Paramount and Columbia before retiring in 1937, to care for her ailing mother. In 1955, Mackaill moved to Honolulu, Hawaii. She had fallen in love with the islands while filming His Captive Woman (1929). Mackaill lived at the luxurious Royal Hawaiian Hotel on the beach at Waikiki as a sort of celebrity-in-residence and enjoyed swimming in the ocean nearly every day.

She occasionally came out of retirement to appear in television productions, including two episodes of Hawaii Five-O in 1976 and 1980.

== Personal life ==
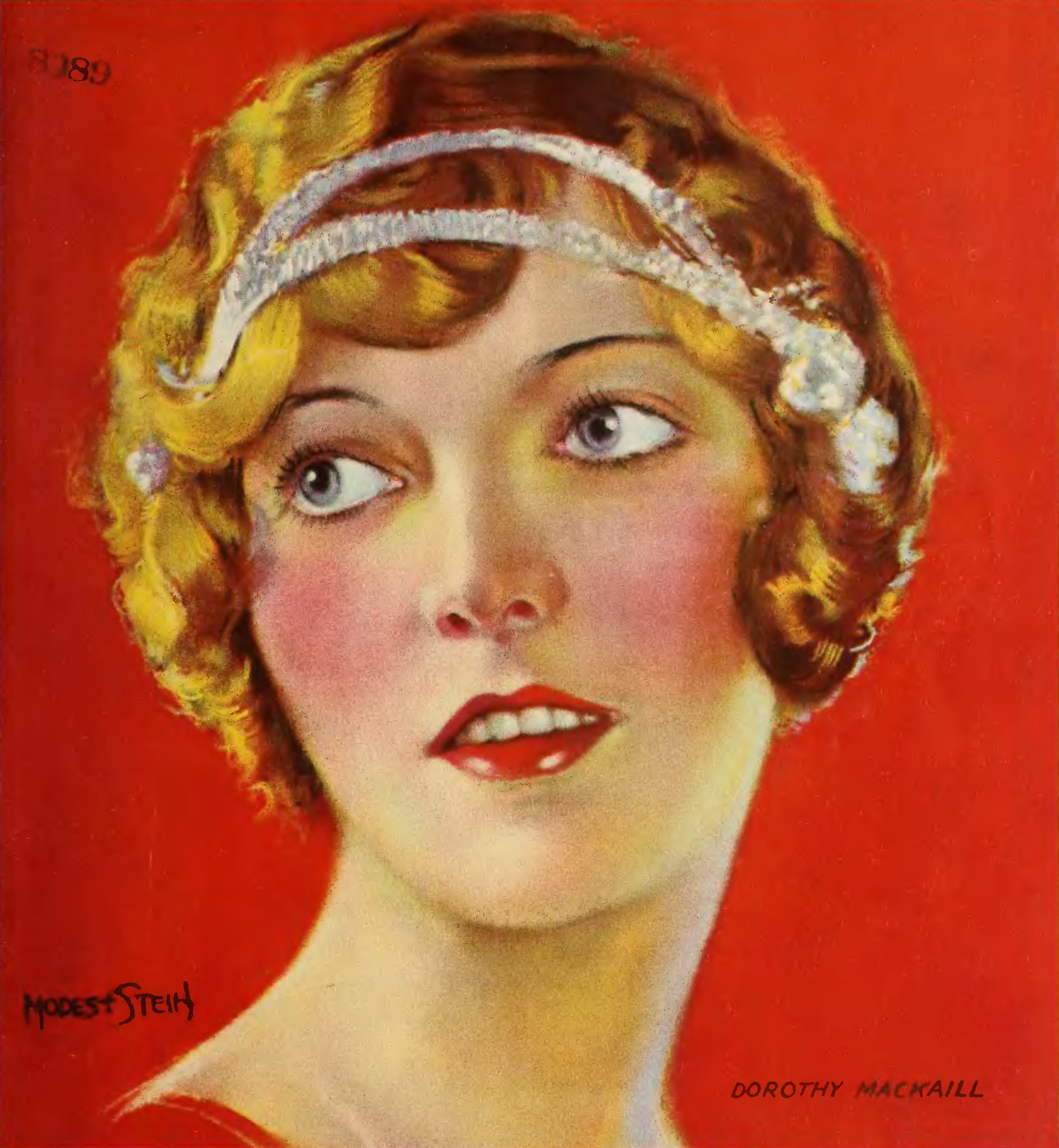
1926 Dorothy Mackaill cover art from Picture-Play Magazine

Mackaill was married three times. Her first marriage was to German film director Lothar Mendes, on November 17, 1926. They divorced in August 1928. On November 4, 1931, she married radio singer Neil Albert Miller. They divorced in February 1934. Her third and final marriage was to horticulturist Harold Patterson in June 1947. She filed for divorce in December 1948.

Mackaill had no children.

== Naturalization as United States citizen ==
Mackaill became a naturalized United States citizen in 1926, giving 1904 as her year of birth, and her age as 22.

== Death ==
Mackaill resided in Honolulu, Hawaii, during the last 35 years of her life. She died there of liver failure in her room at the Royal Hawaiian Hotel on August 12, 1990. She was cremated and her ashes scattered off Waikiki Beach.

== Filmography ==
Film
Year	Film	Role	Notes
1920	The Face at the Window		Lost film
1920	Torchy		Short film
1920	Torchy's Millions		Short film
1921	Torchy's Promotion		Short film
1921	Bits of Life		Lost film
1921	The Lotus Eater	Uncredited	Lost film
1922	Isle of Doubt	Eleanor Warburton	Lost film
1922	A Woman's Woman	Sally Plummer	Lost film
1922	The Streets of New York	Sally Ann	Lost film
1922	The Inner Man	Sally	Lost film
1923	Mighty Lak' a Rose	Rose Duncan	Lost film
1923	The Broken Violin	Constance Morley	Lost film
1923	The Fighting Blade	Thomsine Musgrove	A copy is held at the UCLA Film and Television Archive
1923	The Fair Cheat	Camilla	Lost film
1923	His Children's Children	Sheila	Lost film
1923	Twenty-One	Lynnie Willis	
1924	The Next Corner	Elsie Maury	Lost film
1924	What Shall I Do?	Jeanie Andrews	Lost film
1924	The Man Who Came Back	Marcelle	An incomplete copy is held at the UCLA Film and Television Archive
1924	The Painted Lady	Violet	Lost film
1924	The Mine with the Iron Door	Marta Hillgrove	A copy is preserved at the Gosfilmofond and the Centre national du cinéma et de l'image animée
1925	The Bridge of Sighs	Linda Harper	An incomplete copy is held at the Centre national du cinéma et de l'image animée
1925	One Year to Live	Marthe	Lost film
1925	Chickie	Chickie	Lost film
1925	The Making of O'Malley	Lucille Thayer	Lost film
1925	Shore Leave	Connie Martin	
1925	Joanna	Joanna Manners	Lost film
1925	The Dancer of Paris	Consuelo Cox	Lost film
1926	Ranson's Folly	Mary Cahill	
1926	Subway Sadie	Sadie Hermann	Lost film
1926	Just Another Blonde	Jeanne Cavanaugh	Alternative title: The Girl from Coney Island; An incomplete copy is held at the UCLA Film and Television Archive
1927	The Lunatic at Large	Beatrix Staynes	Lost film
1927	Convoy	Sylvia Dodge	Lost film
1927	Smile, Brother, Smile	Mildred Marvin	Lost film
1927	The Crystal Cup	Gita Carteret	Lost film
1927	Man Crazy	Clarissa Janeway	Lost film
1928	Ladies' Night in a Turkish Bath	Helen Slocum	A copy is held at the UCLA Film and Television Archive
1928	Lady Be Good	Mary	Lost film
1928	The Whip	Lady Diana	Copies are held at the Cineteca Italiana and the UCLA Film and Television Archive
1928	Waterfront	Peggy Ann Andrews	A copy is held at the Cineteca Italiana
1928	The Barker	Lou	A copy is held at the UCLA Film and Television Archive
1929	His Captive Woman	Anna Janssen	A copy is held at the Library Of Congress
1929	Children of the Ritz	Angela Pennington	Lost film
1929	Two Weeks Off	Kitty Weaver	A copy is held at the UCLA Film and Television Archive
1929	Hard to Get	Bobby Martin	Lost film Alternative title: Classified
1929	The Great Divide	Ruth Jordan	
1929	The Love Racket	Betty Brown	Lost film
1930	Strictly Modern	Kate	Lost film
1930	The Flirting Widow	Celia	
1930	The Office Wife	Anne Murdock	
1930	Man Trouble	Joan	
1930	Bright Lights	Louanne	Produced in Technicolor, which is now lost, only a black-and-white edited copy survives Alternative title: Adventures in Africa
1931	Once a Sinner	Diana Barry	
1931	Kept Husbands	Dorothea "Dot" Parker Brunton	
1931	Party Husband	Laura	
1931	Their Mad Moment	Emily Stanley	Alternative title: Basquerie
1931	The Reckless Hour	Margaret "Margie" Nichols	
1931	Safe in Hell	Gilda Carlson - aka Gilda Erickson	
1932	Love Affair	Carol Owen	
1932	No Man of Her Own	Kay Everly	
1933	Neighbors' Wives	Helen McGrath	
1933	Curtain at Eight	Lola Cresmer	Alternative title: Backstage Mystery
1933	The Chief	Dixie Dean	
1934	Picture Brides	Mame Smith	
1934	Cheaters	Mabel	
1937	Bulldog Drummond at Bay	Doris Thompson	
Television
Year	Title	Role	Notes
1953	Studio One in Hollywood		Episode: "The Magic Lantern"
1976; 1980	Hawaii Five-O	Mrs. Pelcher; Old Lady	Episode 202: "Target–A Cop"; Episode 271: "School for Assassins"
