= Two Weeks Off =

1929 film

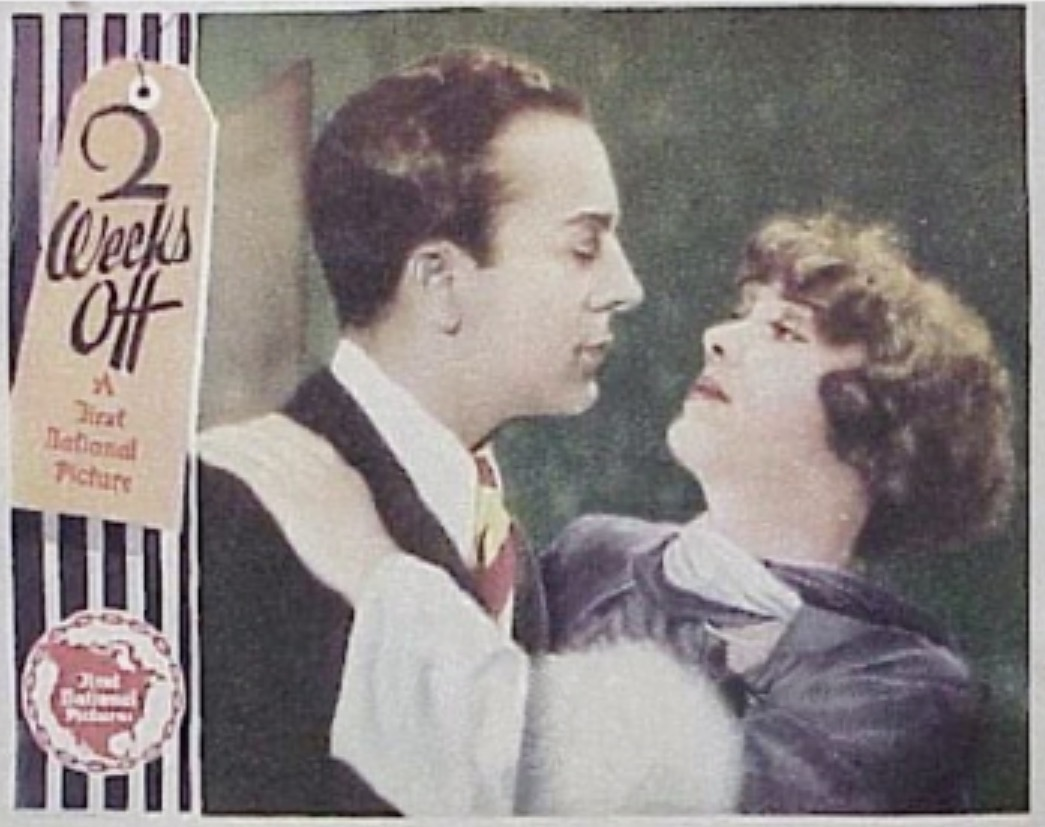
- Lobby card
- Directed by: William Beaudine
- Screenplay by: F. McGrew Willis; Joseph F. Poland
- Based on: the novel, Weeks Off, a Summertime Comedy by Thomas Barrows; Kenyon Nicholson
- Produced by: Richard A. Rowland
- Starring: Dorothy Mackaill
- Cinematography: Sidney Hickox
- Edited by: Ralph Holt
- Music by: Alois Reiser (uncredited)
- Distributed by: First National Pictures
- Release date: May 12, 1929
- Running time: 88 minutes
- Country: United States
- Languages: Sound (part-talkie); English intertitles

Two Weeks Off is a 1929 American sound part-talkie comedy film directed by William Beaudine. In addition to sequences with audible dialogue or talking sequences, the film features a synchronized musical score and sound effects along with English intertitles. According to the film review in Variety, 25 percent of the total running time featured dialogue. The soundtrack was recorded using the Vitaphone sound-on-disc system.

== Plot ==
Frances Weaver, a pretty and spirited shop girl, dreams of a beach vacation to escape the monotony of department store life. As she helps customers in the bathing suit section, she deftly evades the watchful eye of a sour-faced floorwalker. Her friend and boss Agnes, a tough but supportive department head, plans to accompany her on the trip, and fellow shopgirl Maizie Loomis gives Frances a list of potential dates—phone numbers collected from various beach-town flirts. Maizie reserves her favorite, Sid Winters, for herself, as she plans to join them a week later.

Meanwhile, chaos bubbles at the Weaver home, where the comically inept Pa Weaver is bailing out an overflowing bathroom washbowl to keep hot water from flooding the place, thanks to a busted faucet. Salvation arrives in the form of Dave Brown, a cheerful and capable plumber who is also a family friend. Just then, Frances arrives home, thrilled to start her long-awaited getaway. The trip is nearly spoiled when Ma Weaver receives a message from the store that Frances’ vacation is canceled. However, the fiery Agnes quickly takes control, threatening the store manager with scandal unless he reinstates Frances’ time off—which he does.

The vacation begins—but it's a washout. Days of rain dampen the beach-town mood. Frances, working her way down Maizie's list of beachside bachelors, finds not one promising suitor. Then, by surprise, Sid, the one man Maizie was saving for herself, turns up and begins making romantic overtures to Frances. She lets him woo her a bit—he is, after all, a lifeguard—and the attention breaks the tedium. The real shift comes when Dave arrives at the beach town. He's secretly admired Frances from afar at her parents' home but never had the nerve to approach her. By a twist of fate, Dave receives a telegram meant for a movie star and is mistakenly assumed to be a famous actor. Frances is instantly impressed.

Despite a tentative flirtation with Sid, Frances quickly warms to the charming "film star." Tensions rise when Dave punches Sid for interfering with his date with Frances. When Maizie arrives and finds both Sid and Dave cozying up to Frances, she's furious—convinced her friend stole her man. Fuelled by jealousy, Maizie and Sid team up for revenge. Dave, trying to stretch his false celebrity status, accepts a small plumbing job to keep up appearances. But Maizie and Sid catch him in the act and plot a public humiliation.

Their chance comes at a local benefit, where Dave performs a dramatic recital of The Shooting of Dan McGrew, still pretending to be a Hollywood star. Maizie and Sid expose him mid-performance, revealing he's really just a plumber. Humiliated and heartbroken, Frances dumps Dave and returns home, embarrassed by the scandal. Back at the Weaver home, Pa Weaver sees how sad she is and secretly calls Dave. To help things along, he sends Ma out on an errand to give the young couple privacy. Not knowing any of this, Frances, now missing Dave deeply, decides to break the faucet again on purpose and calls the plumbing company. She's told Dave is out—but just as she hangs up, he appears in person.

== Cast ==
- Dorothy Mackaill as Kitty Weaver
- Jack Mulhall as Dave Pickett
- Gertrude Astor as Agnes
- James Finlayson as Pa Weaver
- Kate Price as Ma Weaver
- Jed Prouty as Harry
- Eddie Gribbon as Sid Winters
- Gertrude Messinger as Tessie McCann

== Music ==
The film features a theme song entitled "Love Thrills" with words by Al Bryan and music by George W. Meyer.

== Preservation ==
A complete nitrate print of Two Weeks Off survives at the UCLA Film & Television Archive.

== See also ==
- List of early sound feature films (1926–1929)
