= Joe Donahue (actor) =

American actor and dancer

- Born: Joseph Arthur Donahue; January 3, 1899; Boston, Massachusetts, U.S.
- Died: January 3, 1943 (aged 44); Boston, Massachusetts
- Occupations: Dancer, actor

Joseph Arthur Donahue (January 3, 1899 – January 3, 1943) was an American dancer and film actor.

Joe Donahue was born in Boston, Massachusetts, the fifth of seven children of Irish immigrants Julia Buckley and Dennis Donahue, and the younger brother (by ten years) of Jack Donahue, who became a successful dancer and comedian in vaudeville and on Broadway.

Joe Donahue claimed to have started dancing aged 12, though during the First World War he worked as a shipfitter at the Boston Navy Yard. By 1919, he sometimes worked as his brother's understudy in shows, including the musical Sunny in 1925, which starred Marilyn Miller. After Jack Donahue became terminally ill in 1930, Miller invited Joe to fill his brother's role in the screen adaptation of Sunny. He appeared in four more films, Party Husband, The Reckless Hour (both 1931), Expensive Women and The Boudoir Butler (both 1932). He then returned to vaudeville, where for a few years he was billed as "The World's Greatest Dancer", or as "Jack Donahue's Little Brother".

His success did not last, and he died at City Hospital, Boston, on his 44th birthday in 1943; the cause was given as pneumonia.
