= The Man Who Came Back (1924 film) =

1924 film directed by Emmett J. Flynn

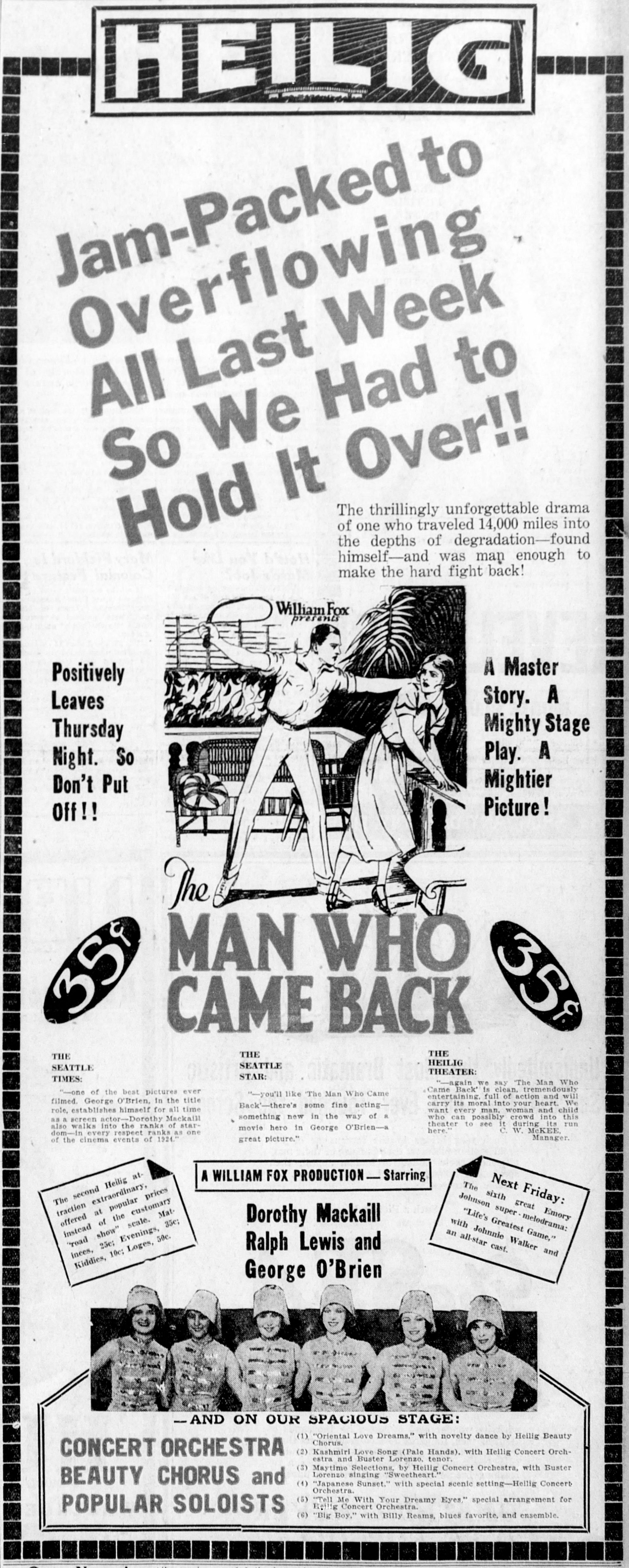
- Directed by: Emmett J. Flynn
- Written by: Edmund Goulding
- Based on: novel by John Fleming Wilson and play The Man Who Came Back by Jules Eckert Goodman c.1916
- Produced by: William Fox
- Starring: George O'Brien; Dorothy Mackaill
- Cinematography: Lucien Andriot
- Distributed by: Fox Film Corporation
- Release date: August 17, 1924
- Country: USA
- Language: Silent..English intertitles

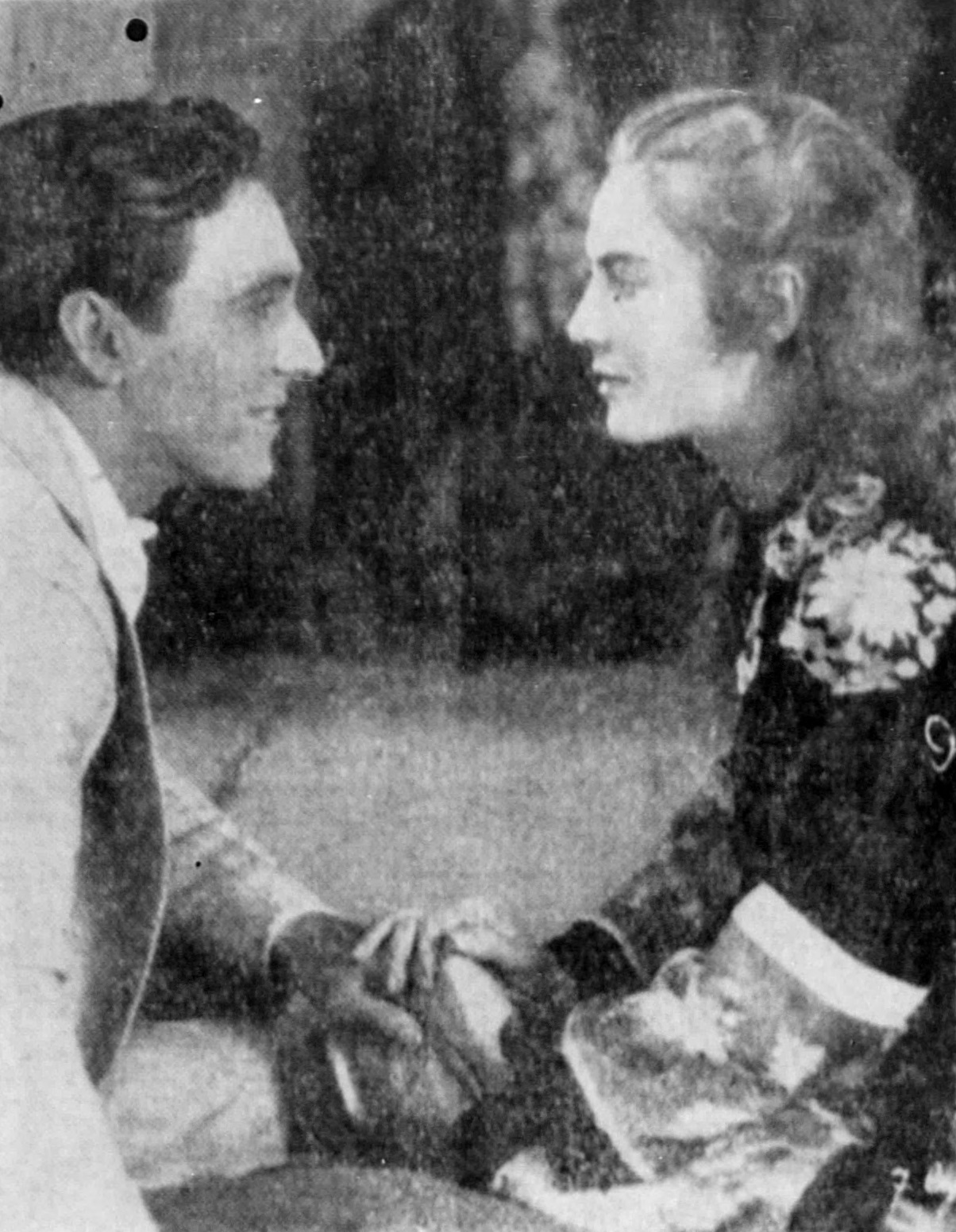
Publicity photo for the film

The Man Who Came Back is a 1924 silent film drama directed by Emmett J. Flynn and starring George O'Brien and Dorothy Mackaill. It was produced and released by Fox Film Corporation.

Fox brought the story to the screen again in 1931 as an early talkie, The Man Who Came Back.

== Cast ==
- George O'Brien - Henry Potter
- Dorothy Mackaill - Marcelle
- Cyril Chadwick - Captain Trevelan
- Ralph Lewis - Thomas Potter
- Emily Fitzroy - Aunt Isabel
- Harvey Clark - Charles Reisling
- Edward Peil, Sr. - Sam Shu Sin
- David Kirby - Gibson
- James Gordon - Captain Gallon
- Walter Wilkinson - Henry Potter (4 years of age)
- Winston Miller - Henry Potter (12 years of age)

== Preservation status ==
- Incomplete or fragment held at Narodni Filmovy Archive and incomplete print at the UCLA Film & Television.
