= The Big Stampede =

1932 film

- Film poster
- Directed by: Tenny Wright
- Written by: Marion Jackson; Kurt Kempler
- Produced by: Sid Rogell; Leon Schlesinger
- Starring: John Wayne; Noah Beery; Mae Madison; Luis Alberni; Berton Churchill
- Cinematography: Harry Fischbeck
- Edited by: Frank Ware
- Music by: Bernhard Kaun
- Production company: Leon Schlesinger Productions
- Distributed by: Warner Bros. Pictures
- Release date: October 8, 1932
- Running time: 54 minutes
- Country: United States
- Language: English

The Big Stampede is a 1932 pre-Code American Western film starring John Wayne (with his horse named "Duke") and Noah Beery. The picture was released by Warner Bros. Pictures. It is a remake of the 1927 film The Land Beyond the Law.

== Plot ==
Deputy Sheriff Steele is commissioned by Governor Wallace to protect settlers in New Mexico Territory while a cattle baron and his accomplice try to prevent the newcomers from settling there.

== Cast ==
- John Wayne as Deputy Sheriff John Steele
- Noah Beery as Sam Crew
- Paul Hurst as "Arizona" Frank Bailey
- Mae Madison as Ginger Malloy
- Luis Alberni as Sonora Joe
- Berton Churchill as Governor Lew Wallace
- Sherwood Bailey as Pat Malloy
- Lafe McKee as Cal Brett
- Joseph W. Girard as Major Parker

== Production notes ==
Much of the footage in this film was reused from The Land Beyond the Law (1927), which starred Ken Maynard. Warner Bros. Pictures had Wayne dress in outfits that matched those worn by Maynard in the earlier film. Discrepancies occurred, however, when new footage was shot on a different location from that of the previous film.

== See also ==
- John Wayne filmography
- List of American films of 1932
