= Jack Donahue (dancer) =

American vaudeville performer (1888–1930)

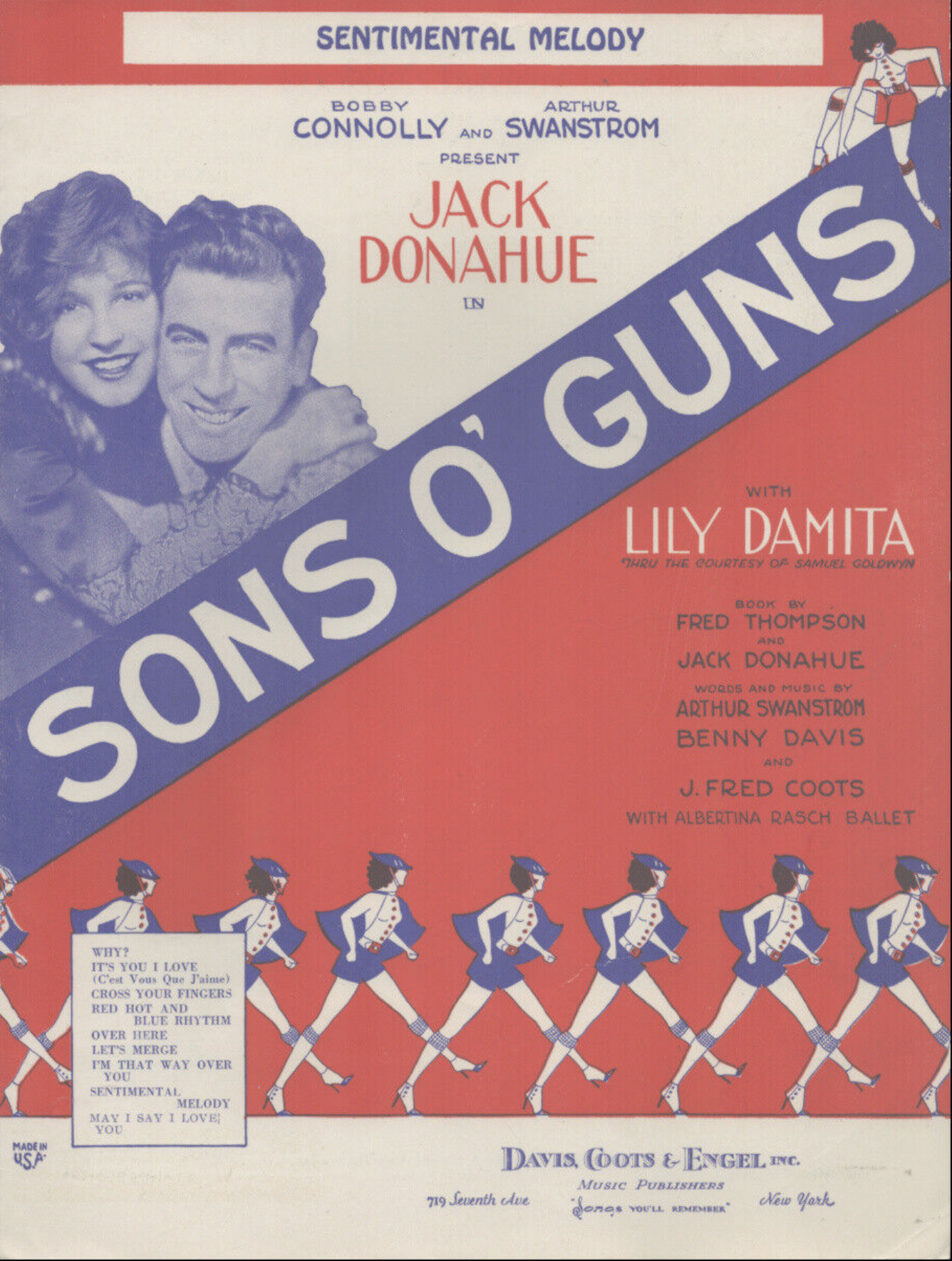
- Jack Donahue with actress Lili Damita on the front cover of the sheet music for the 1929 musical Sons O' Guns
- Born: John Donahue; December 29, 1888; Charlestown, Massachusetts, U.S.
- Died: October 1, 1930 (aged 41); New York City, U.S.
- Occupations: Vaudeville performer; comedian; dancer

John Donahue (December 29, 1888 – October 1, 1930) was an American dancer, comedian, and musical theatre actor who worked in vaudeville, films, and on Broadway.

== Life and career ==
Born in Charlestown, Boston in 1888 (though some sources mistakenly state 1892), Jack Donahue was the eldest of seven children born to Irish immigrants Julia Buckley and Dennis Donahue. He decided to become a dancer, and left home at the age of ten to join a medicine show. He then joined a small repertory company, performing eccentric dances between acts in melodramas, before going into vaudeville.

Donahue performed soft shoe, tap and sand dancing. Initially he danced with male partners, before meeting Alice Stewart, who later became his wife. As the pairing of Donahue and Stewart, they performed a mixture of dance and comedy, with Donahue as the straight man and Stewart as a male dancer. Donahue appeared on his own in a comic role on Broadway in The Woman Haters in 1912, and again, after Stewart had retired from the stage, at the prestigious Palace Theatre in New York City in 1915.

While continuing to perform in vaudeville, Donahue became a star on the Broadway stage in the 1920s, appearing in such shows as Angel Face (1919), the Ziegfeld Follies of 1920, Molly Darling (1922), Sunny (1925), and Rosalie (1928). He was regarded as one of vaudeville's greatest dancers, and on several occasions starred with Marilyn Miller. In late 1929, he starred as the main character in the show Sons O' Guns to which he also co-wrote the lyrics with Alfred Swanstrom. He took the show on the road the following year, but was taken ill while performing in Cincinnati.

His illness was attributed to overwork. After returning to New York, he died in October 1930, from heart failure, at the age of 41. A memoir, Letters of a Hoofer to his Ma, was published posthumously.

In the 1930 film version of Sunny, his younger brother Joe Donahue took his role. The 1949 film Look for the Silver Lining, in which Donahue was played by Ray Bolger, was loosely based on his life and that of Marilyn Miller. In 2010, the play My Vaudeville Man was also based on Donahue's life.
