= American Vaudeville Museum =

Memorabilia museum

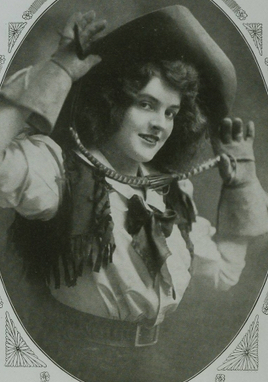
Portrait of Mayme Gehrue from 1909

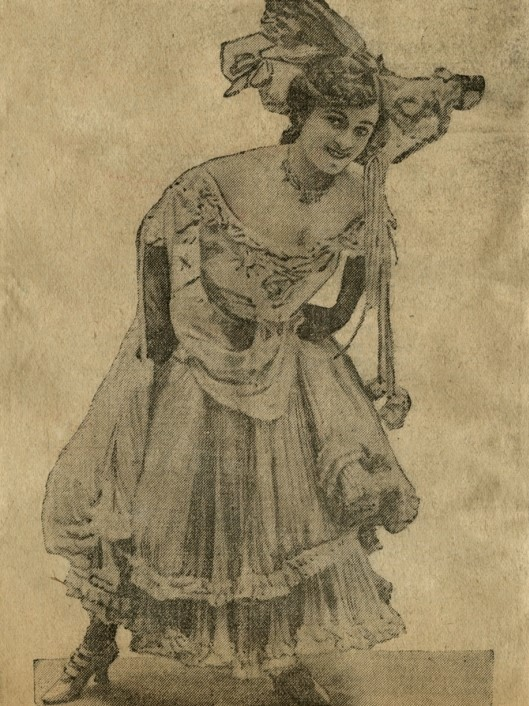
May Boley in the musical The Hurdy-Gurdy Girl

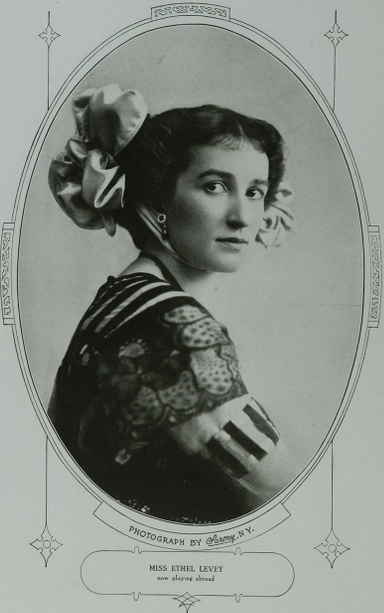
Sarony portrait of Ethel Levey

The American Vaudeville Museum (AVM) was a vaudeville history and memorabilia museum in Edgewood, New Mexico which moved its collection to the University of Arizona and online.

The museum was founded by Frank Cullen and Donald McNeilly. The museum posted historic content online and published Vaudeville Times magazine quarterly from 1998 to 2008 Its virtual museum included a bibliography of sources and an index of vaudevillians. The museum was founded in 1986.
