= The Barker =

1928 film

- Theatrical release poster
- Directed by: George Fitzmaurice
- Written by: Benjamin Glazer; Joseph Jackson; Herman J. Mankiewicz (titles)
- Based on: The Barker by Kenyon Nicholson
- Produced by: Al Rockett; Richard A. Rowland
- Starring: Milton Sills; Dorothy Mackaill; Betty Compson; Douglas Fairbanks Jr.
- Cinematography: Lee Garmes
- Edited by: Stuart Heisler
- Music by: Louis Silvers
- Production company: First National Pictures
- Distributed by: Warner Bros. Pictures
- Release date: December 9, 1928
- Running time: 87 minutes
- Country: United States
- Languages: English (Intertitles and talking scenes)

The Barker is a 1928 American part-talkie pre-Code romantic drama film produced and released by First National Pictures, a subsidiary of Warner Bros. Pictures, acquired in September 1928. The film was directed by George Fitzmaurice and stars Milton Sills, Dorothy Mackaill, Betty Compson, and Douglas Fairbanks Jr. The Barker is a part-talkie with talking sequences and sequences with synchronized musical scoring and sound effects. According to the film review in Variety, 44 percent (or 38 minutes) of the total running time featured dialogue. The film was adapted by Benjamin Glazer, Joseph Jackson and Herman J. Mankiewicz from the play by Kenyon Nicholson.

The Broadway play of the same name which opened at the Biltmore Theatre January 18, 1927 and ran until July 1927 for 221 performances. In the stage production Walter Huston was "Nifty" and a still relatively unknown Claudette Colbert was "Lou", played in the film by Dorothy Mackaill.

== Plot ==
Nifty Miller, a veteran sideshow barker, is known for his ability to draw crowds with his voice and patter. Colonel Gowdy, owner of the carnival, calls him the best barker in the business. Nifty's showmanship conceals a paternal hope: that his son Chris, currently away at school, will never enter show business but will instead pursue a career as a lawyer.

Carrie, a sultry Hawaiian dancer who has never actually been to Honolulu, is passionately in love with Nifty and urges him to marry her. But Nifty refuses, determined not to complicate Chris's future with ties to the carnival world.

His plans are derailed when Chris unexpectedly arrives at the carnival, having run away from his grandfather's farm during summer vacation. Chris begs to stay and work with his father, and Nifty relents, persuading Gowdy to give him a job. In response, Nifty reforms his lifestyle—quitting drinking, distancing himself from Carrie—and dedicates himself fully to raising his son.

Carrie, feeling cast aside, plots revenge. She offers $100 to Lou, an alluring and worldly performer known as the “Colonel’s girl,” to seduce Chris and lead him away from Nifty's ambitions. Lou initially accepts the challenge but soon finds herself genuinely in love with the innocent and idealistic young man. Chris, likewise, falls head over heels for her.

When Colonel Gowdy informs Nifty that he has seen Chris leaving Lou's rooming house late at night, Nifty confronts her with furious accusations. Chris, incensed by his father's harsh treatment of Lou, announces his intent to marry her. In a rage over the apparent collapse of his dreams for Chris, Nifty strikes his son unconscious. Chris and Lou elope and move to Chicago.

Distraught, Nifty learns of Carrie's role in orchestrating Chris's seduction and nearly strangles her in a fit of rage. He then quits the carnival. Carrie leaves as well, and the Colonel hastily replaces them with a new dancer and a greenhorn barker. But during a performance, when the new barker falters and the crowd begins to drift away, Nifty's instinct for showmanship takes over. He leaps into action, delivering his pitch with unmatched flair and saving the night's business.

Soon after, Nifty receives a postcard from Chicago: Chris is attending law school and working, and he and Lou are happy together. Encouraged by the news, Nifty accepts Gowdy's offer of a partnership in the carnival. In a final gesture, he gruffly suggests to Carrie that if she stays on as the show's dancer, he may eventually forgive her.

== Cast ==
- Dorothy Mackaill as Lou
- Milton Sills as Nifty Miller, the barker
- Douglas Fairbanks Jr. as Chris Miller
- Betty Compson as Carrie
- Sylvia Ashton as Ma Benson
- George Cooper as Hap Spissel
- S. S. Simon as Col. Gowdy
- Tom Dugan as Stuttering Spieler

Uncredited:

- Bobby Dunn as Hamburger concessionaire
- Pat Harmon as Heckler
- Bynunsky Hyman as Fire Eater
- Gladden James as Member of Hawaiian Trio
- Charles Sullivan as Man in audience
- Pat West as Bartender

== Awards and honors ==
Year	Award	Result	Category	Recipient
1928	Academy Award	Nominated	Best Actress in a Leading Role	Betty Compson

== Preservation ==
The film survives intact with its talking sequences and has been preserved by the UCLA Film & Television Archive and the Museum of Modern Art.

== Remakes ==
The Barker was remade as Hoop-La (1933) with Clara Bow and as Diamond Horseshoe (1945) with Betty Grable. Japanese director Yasujirō Ozu remade this film (without crediting the original) as A Story of Floating Weeds (1934) and again as Floating Weeds (1959).

== See also ==
- List of early sound feature films (1926–1929)
- List of early Warner Bros. talking features
