= Richard A. Rowland =

American film producer

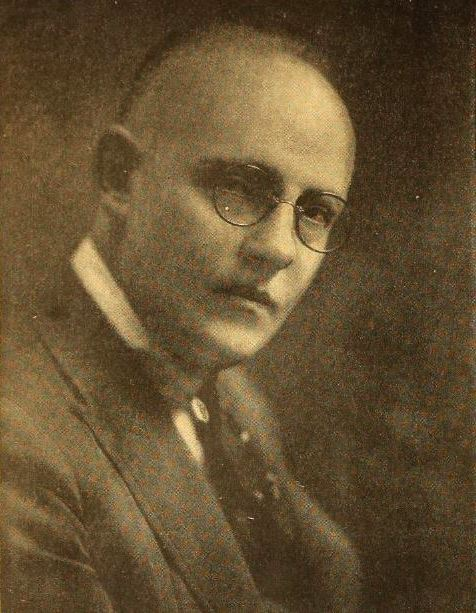
- Rowland in 1920
- Born: December 8, 1880; Pittsburgh, Pennsylvania, U.S.
- Died: May 12, 1947 (aged 66); New York City
- Other name: R. A. Rowland
- Occupations: Studio executive, film producer

Richard A. Rowland (December 8, 1880 – May 12, 1947) was an American studio executive and film producer.

== Career ==
Born in Pittsburgh, Pennsylvania, Rowland was the head of Metro Pictures Corporation from 1915 to 1920, a studio he founded in 1915 along with Louis B. Mayer. Mayer left in 1918 to form his own studio. Metro did most of its productions in Los Angeles and in New York City, where it occasionally leased facilities in Fort Lee, New Jersey. Among Metro's productions were: The Eternal Question (1916) with Olga Petrova, The Divorcée (1919) with Ethel Barrymore, and What Will People Say? (1915) directed by Alice Guy-Blache.

In 1919, when Charlie Chaplin, D.W. Griffith, Douglas Fairbanks, and Mary Pickford formed United Artists to protect their work and control their careers, Rowland, then head of Metro Studios, famously remarked that "the lunatics have taken over the asylum".

In 1920, Rowland sold Metro to Marcus Loew, and subsequently became an executive at Fox Film Corporation. Loew was acquiring studios to help supply product to his theater chain. A few years later, Loew merged Metro with recently acquired Goldwyn Pictures Corporation to form Metro-Goldwyn-Mayer (MGM).

Rowland is credited as a producer on films released by First National Pictures.

Rowland played a key role in the setting of standards and improving the speed of movie projection to improve the quality of the experience as a member of the Society of Motion Picture Engineers, later the Society of Motion Picture and Television Engineers (SMPTE).

== Later years and death ==
Later in life, he was a professor at Columbia University, where he wrote several academic articles on the role that film played in modern culture. In one of his essays, titled American Classic, he argues that Marx Brothers films are classics that will stand the test of time.

Rowland died on May 12, 1947, in New York City. For his contribution to the motion picture industry, Rowland has a star on the Hollywood Walk of Fame located at 1541 Vine Street.

== Filmography ==
Year	Film	Notes
1918	Pay Day	actor, as himself
1928	The Barker	Producer
1929	The Divine Lady	Executive producer
1929	House of Horror	Producer
1929	Two Weeks Off	Producer
1936	I'd Give My Life	Producer
1936	Along Came Love	Producer
1941	Cheers for Miss Bishop	Producer
