= The Reckless Hour =

1931 film

- Directed by: John Francis Dillon
- Written by: Florence Ryerson
- Based on: Ambush by Arthur Richman
- Starring: Dorothy Mackaill; Conrad Nagel; H.B. Warner; Joan Blondell
- Cinematography: James Van Trees
- Edited by: Harold Young
- Music by: David Mendoza; Oscar Potoker
- Production company: First National Pictures
- Distributed by: Warner Bros. Pictures
- Release date: August 15, 1931
- Running time: 71 minutes
- Country: United States
- Language: English

The Reckless Hour is a 1931 American pre-Code drama film directed by John Francis Dillon and starring Dorothy Mackaill, Conrad Nagel, H.B. Warner and Joan Blondell. It was produced and distributed by First National Pictures, which was controlled by Warner Bros. Pictures. It was based on the play Ambush by Arthur Richman.

== Plot ==
In New York City, a young model is swept off her feet by a debonair, handsome young man. Unfortunately for her, he didn't want to get married but had been stringing her along. When she realizes he doesn't want her, she will not force him even though she learned she was pregnant. She becomes bitter and angry at all men, until she meets a gentle and kind artist who tries to show her that her life can be better than it is.

== Cast ==
- Dorothy Mackaill as Margaret Nichols
- Conrad Nagel as Edward Adams
- H. B. Warner as Walter Nichols
- Joan Blondell as Myrtle Nichols
- Walter Byron as Allen Crane
- Joe Donahue as Harry Gleason
- Dorothy Peterson as Miss Susie Jennison
- Helen Ware as Harriett Nichols
- Billy House as Seymour Jennison
- Claude King as Howard Crane
- Ivan F. Simpson as Stevens, Adam's butler

== Preservation status ==
The film is preserved at the Library of Congress.

== Home media ==
It was released on Warner Archive DVD with another Mackaill film, Bright Lights.
