= 12th Academy Awards =

- Date: February 29, 1940
- Site: Coconut Grove, The Ambassador Hotel, Los Angeles
- Hosted by: Bob Hope

Highlights
- Best Picture: Gone with the Wind
- Most awards: Gone with the Wind (8)
- Most nominations: Gone with the Wind (13)

The 12th Academy Awards ceremony, held on February 29, 1940, by the Academy of Motion Picture Arts and Sciences (AMPAS), honored the best in film for 1939 at a banquet in the Coconut Grove at The Ambassador Hotel in Los Angeles. It was hosted by Bob Hope, in his first of nineteen turns as host.

David O. Selznick's Gone with the Wind received the most nominations of the year with thirteen, winning eight Oscars (both records at the time). It became the first film in color that won Best Picture. This year was the first in which multiple films received ten or more nominations (Mr. Smith Goes to Washington received eleven).

This was the first year in which Best Visual Effects was a competitive category; previously, "special achievement" awards for effects had occasionally been conferred. This year, Best Cinematography was split into Color and Black & White categories.

Hattie McDaniel became the first African-American to receive an Academy Award, winning Best Supporting Actress for Gone with the Wind. Mickey Rooney became the second-youngest nominee for Best Actor at 19, and the first teenager to be nominated for an Academy Award, for his performance in Babes in Arms.

== Winners and nominees ==
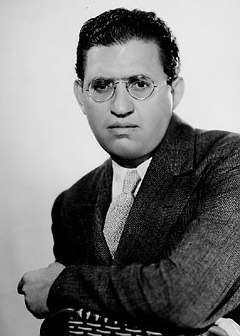
David O. Selznick; Best Picture winner and Irving G. Thalberg Memorial Award recipient

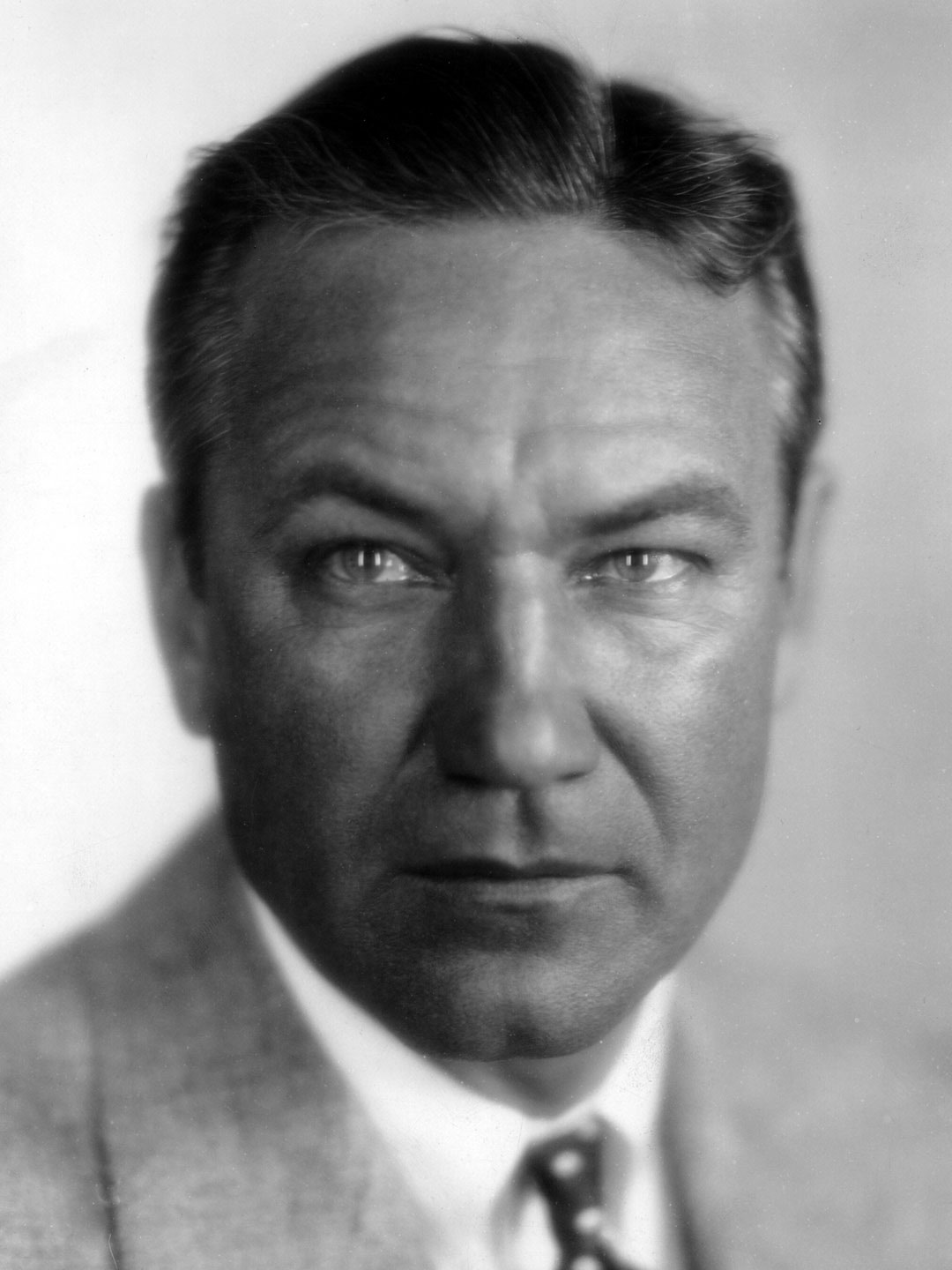
Victor Fleming; Best Director winner

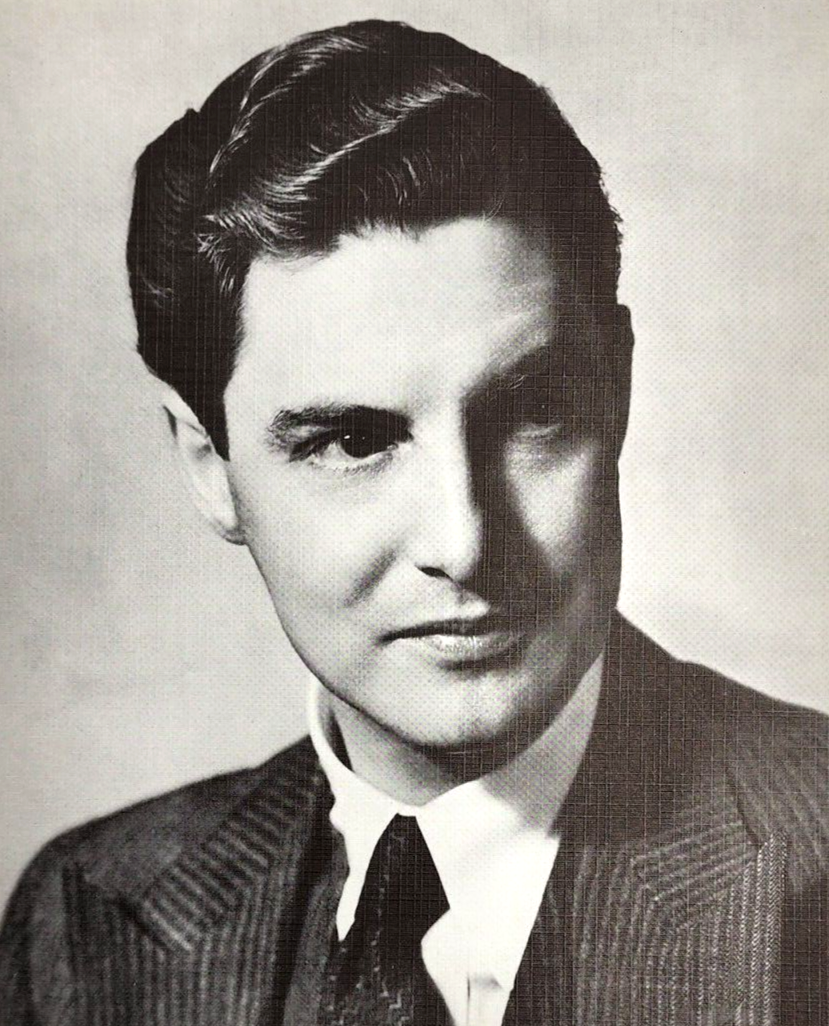
Robert Donat; Best Actor winner

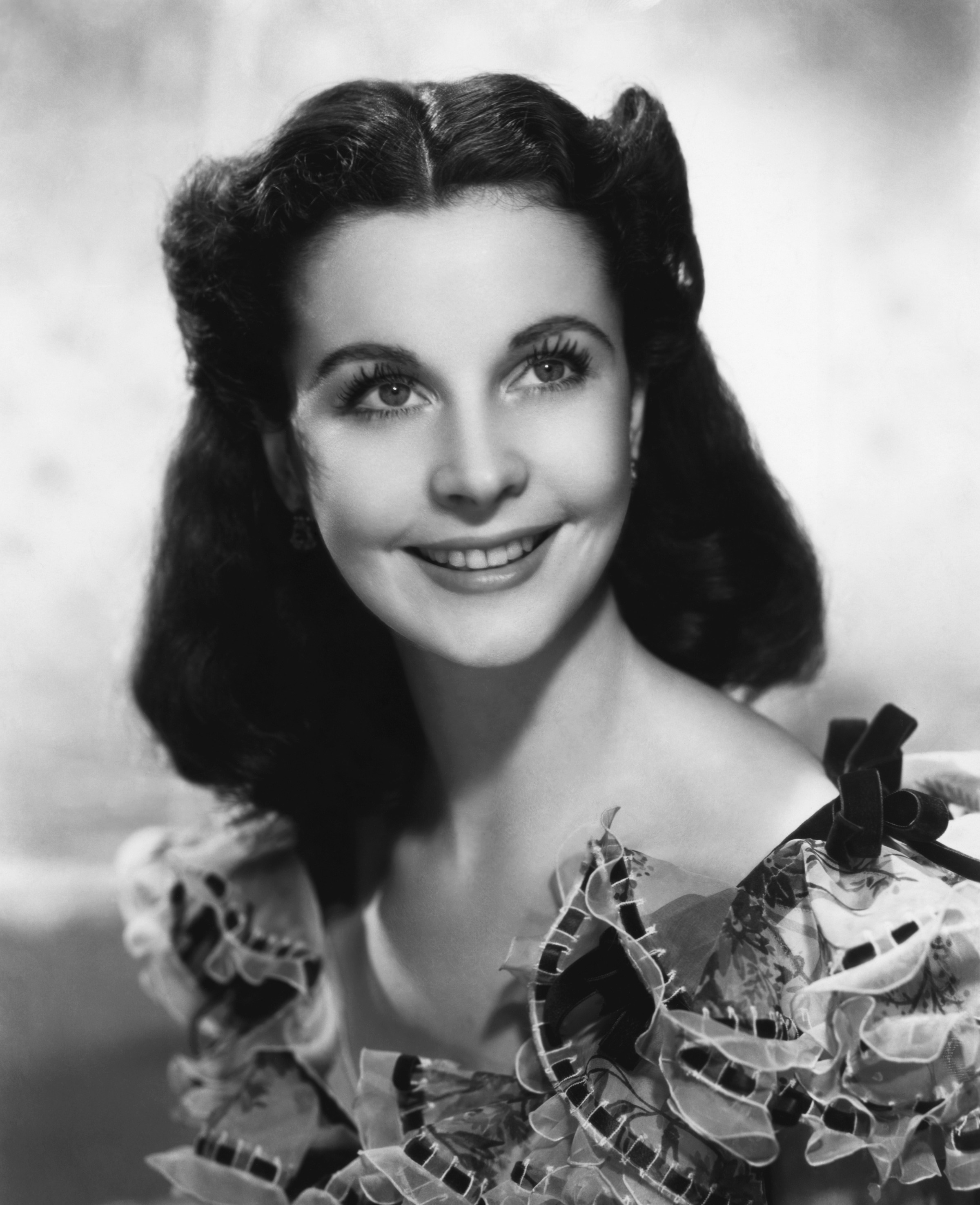
Vivien Leigh; Best Actress winner

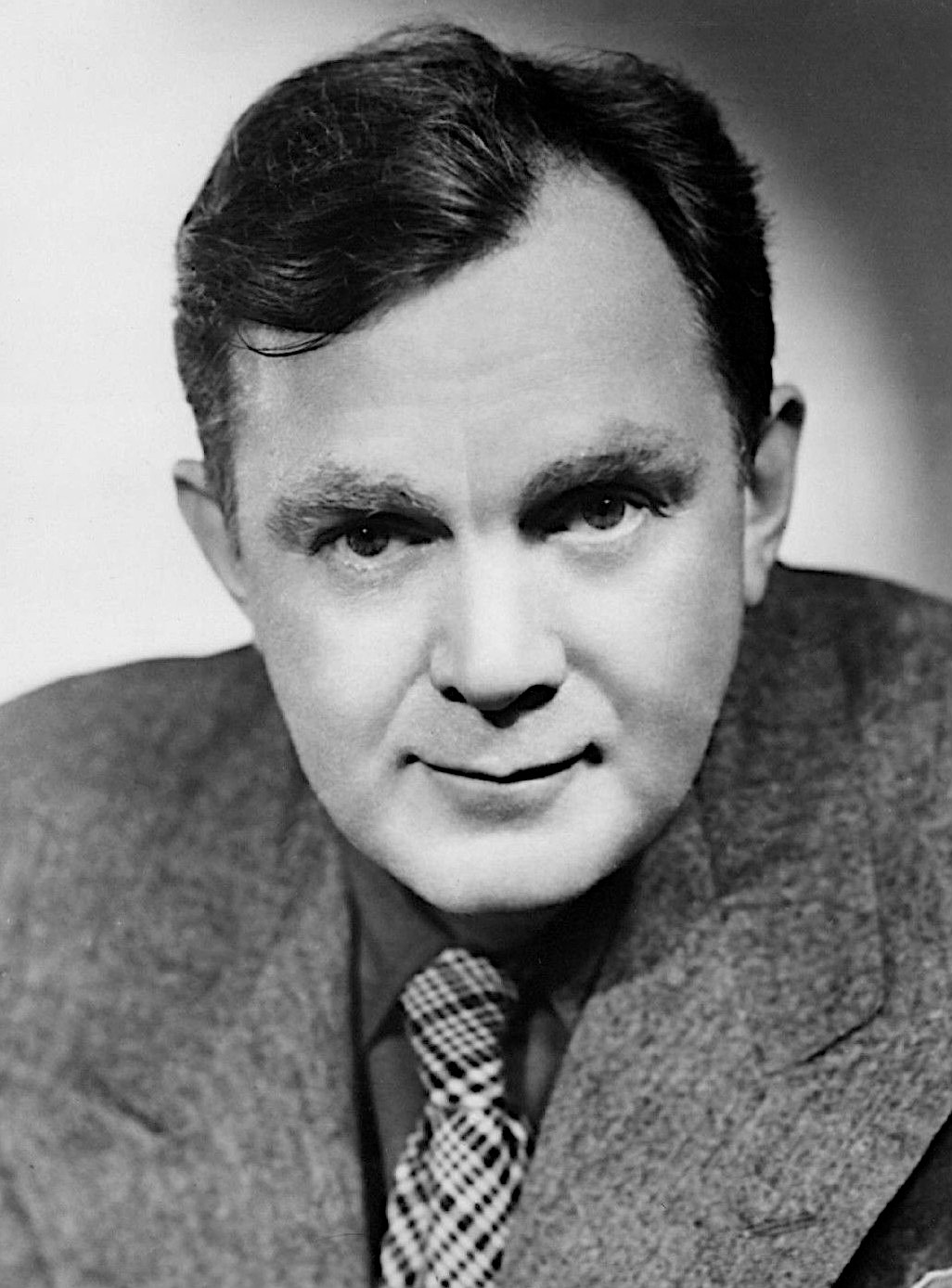
Thomas Mitchell; Best Supporting Actor winner

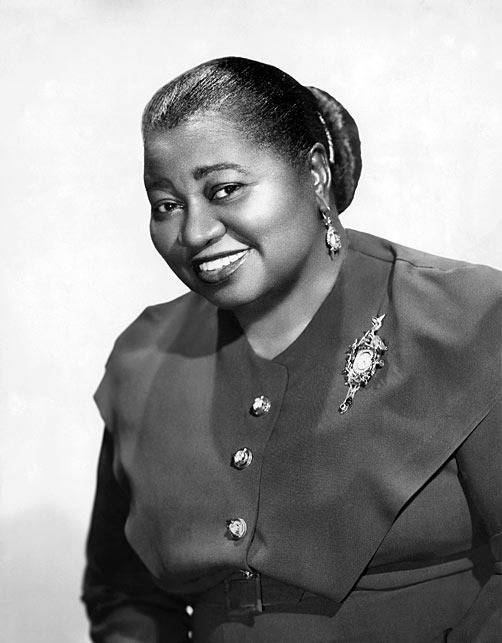
Hattie McDaniel; Best Supporting Actress winner

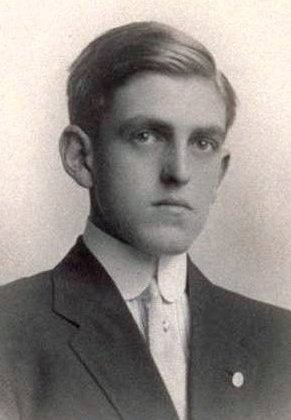
Sidney Howard; Best Screenplay winner

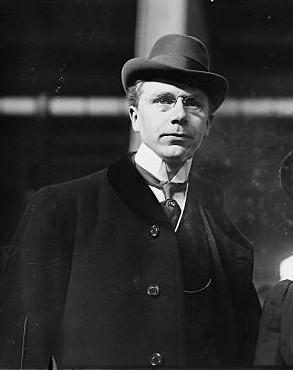
Richard Hageman; Best Scoring co-winner

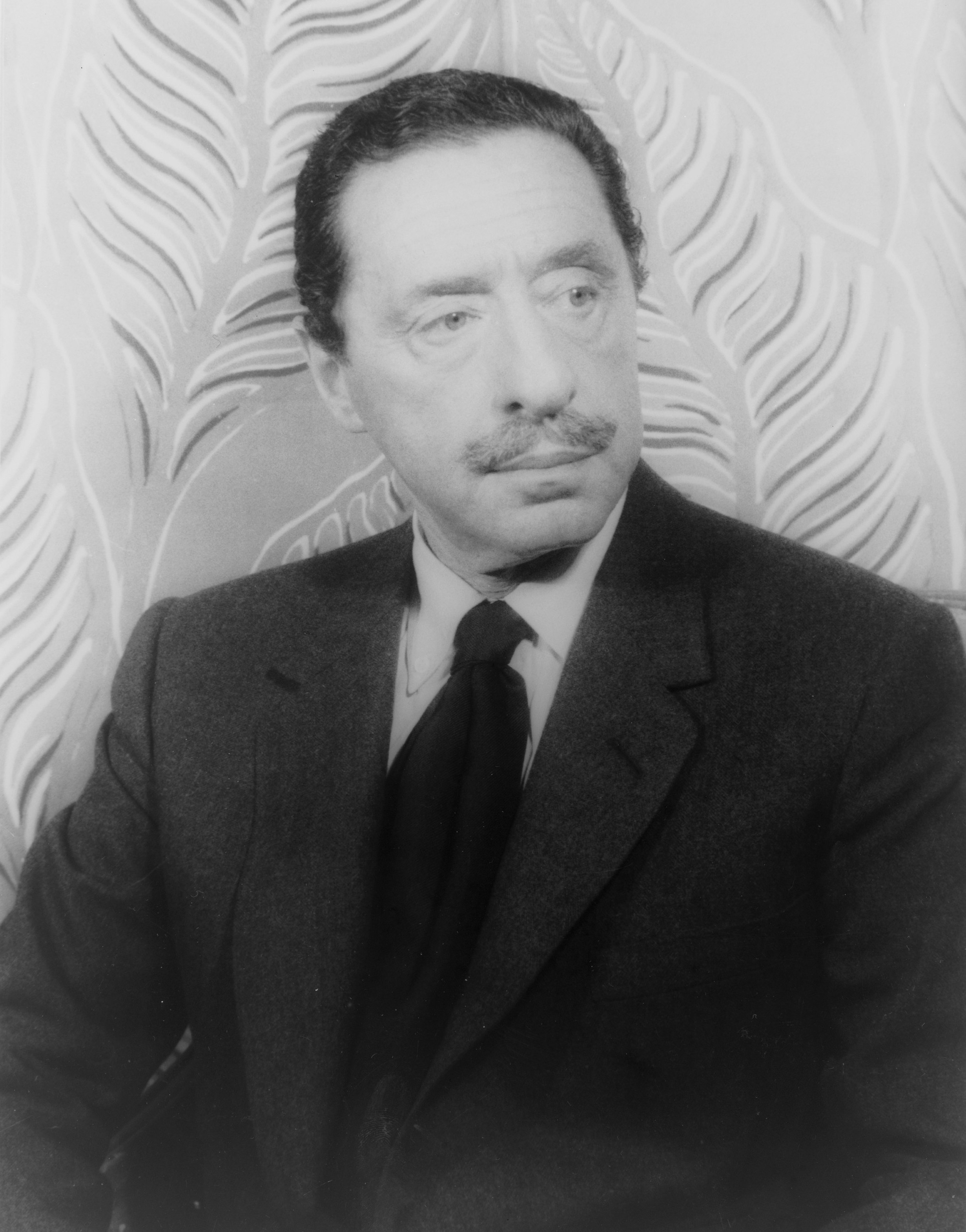
Harold Arlen; Best Song co-winner

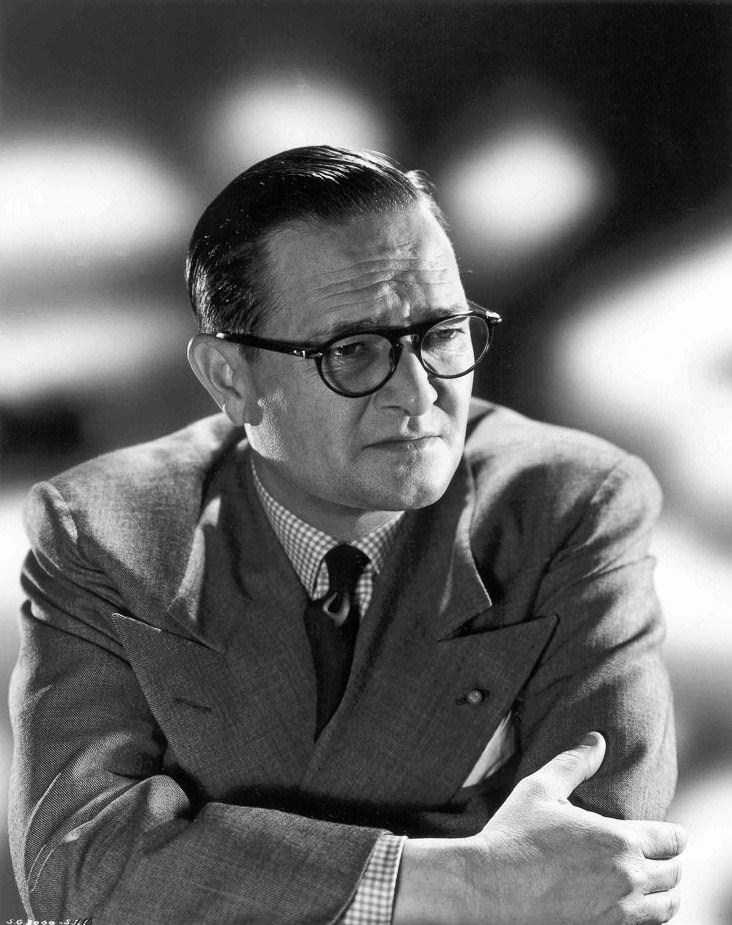
Gregg Toland; Best Cinematography, Black-and-White winner

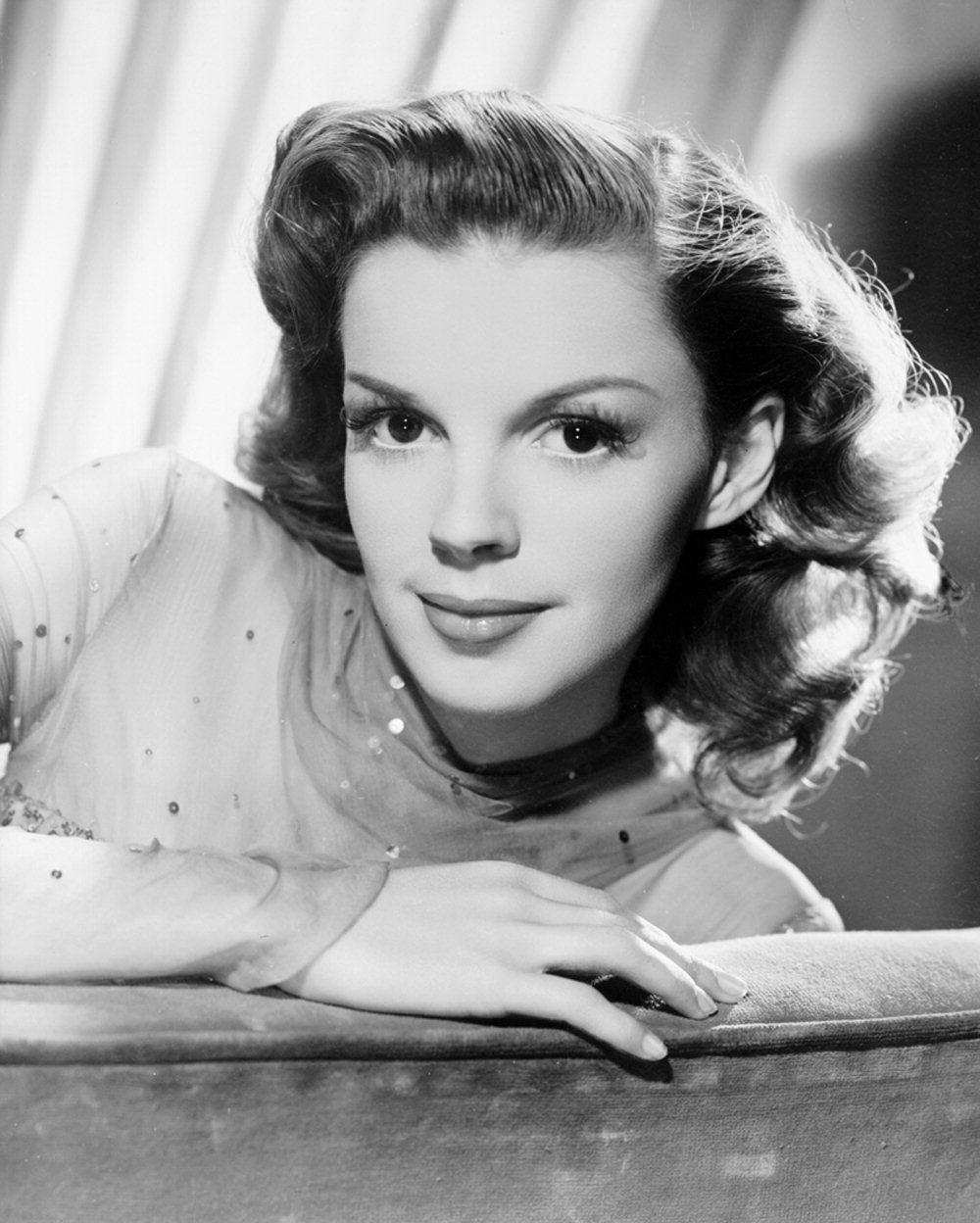
Judy Garland; Juvenile Academy Award recipient

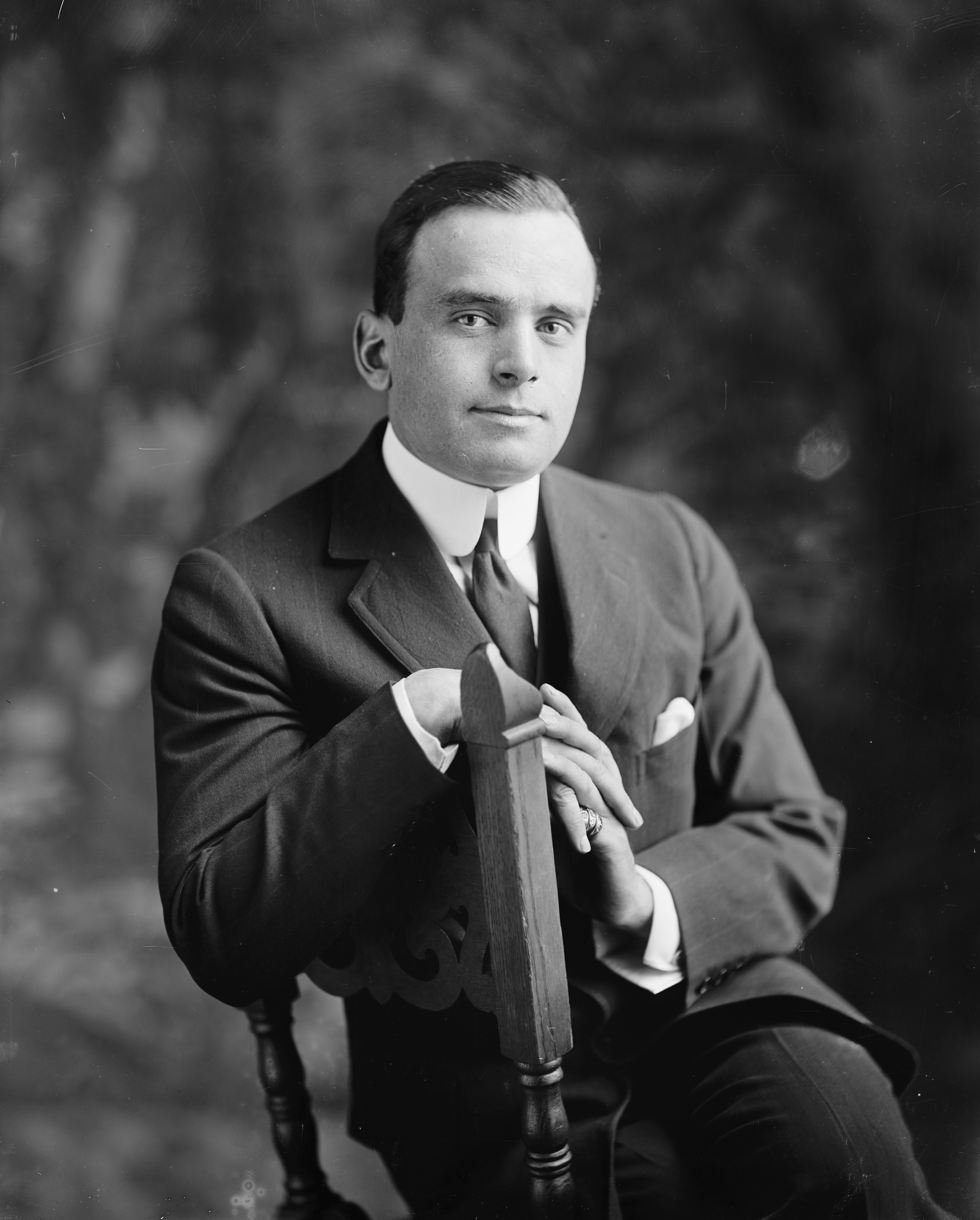
Douglas Fairbanks; Honorary Academy Award recipient

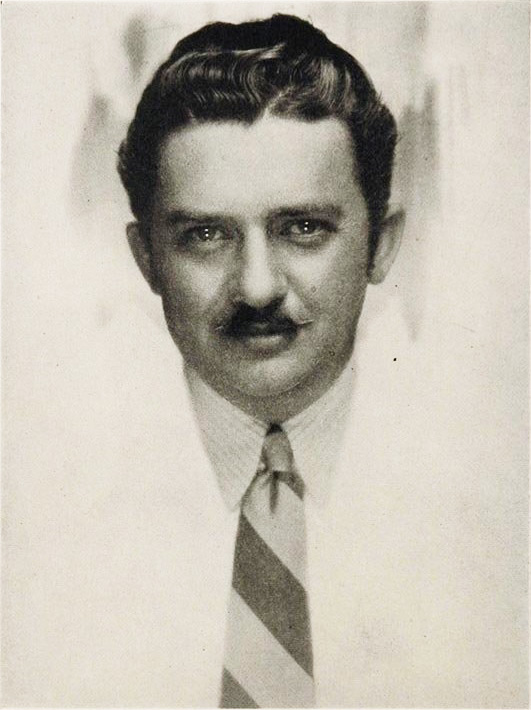
Jean Hersholt; Honorary Academy Award recipient

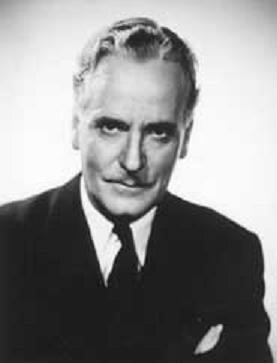
Ralph Morgan; Honorary Academy Award recipient

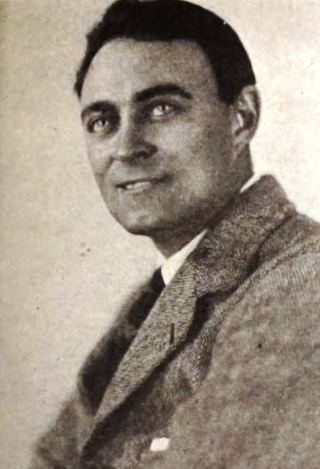
Ralph Block; Honorary Academy Award recipient

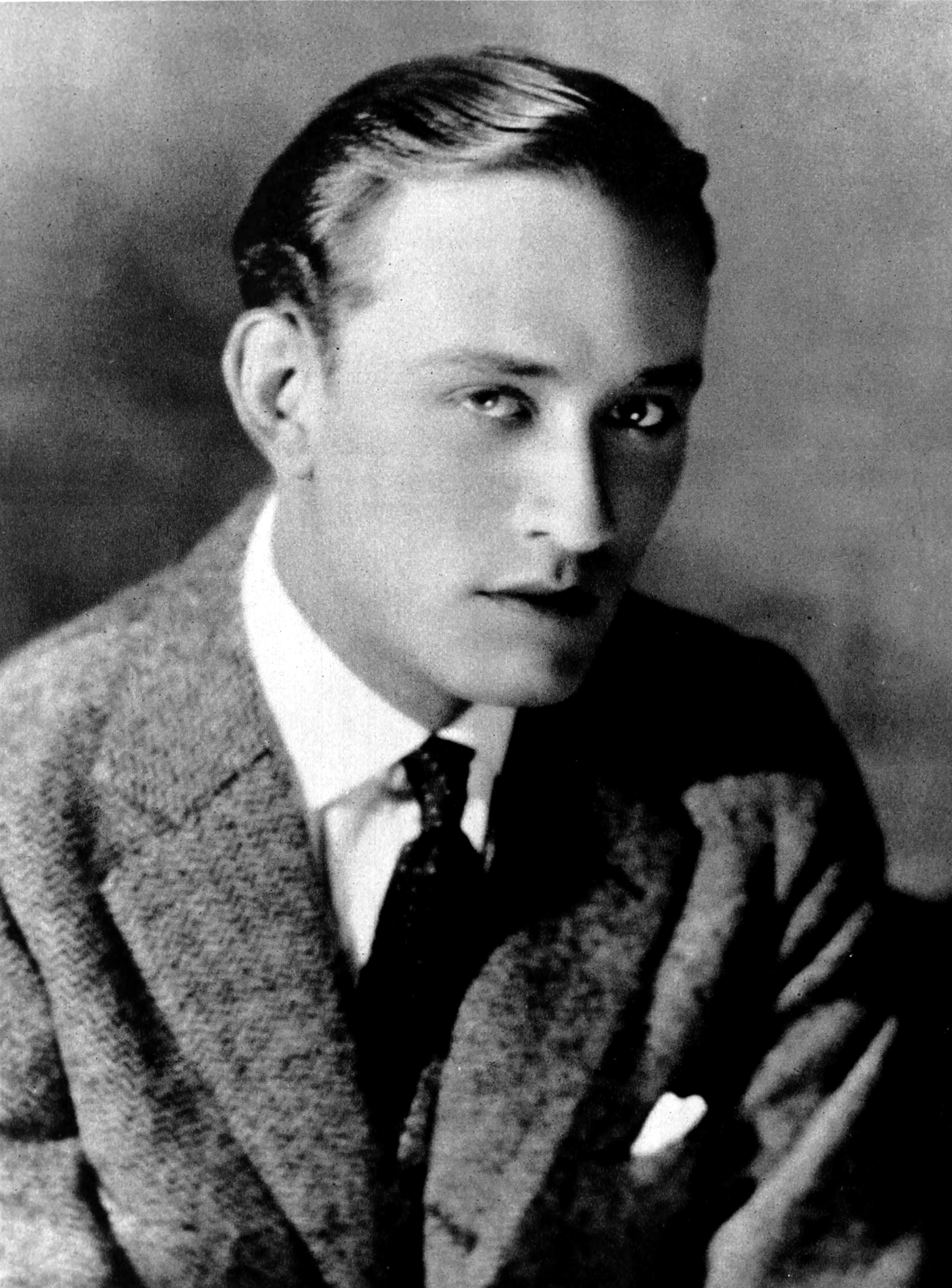
Conrad Nagel; Honorary Academy Award recipient

=== Awards ===
Nominees were announced on February 11, 1940. AMPAS presented Academy Awards of Merit in 20 categories. Nominees for each award are listed below; award winners are listed first and highlighted in boldface.

**Outstanding Production**: **Gone With the Wind** **– David O. Selznick for Selznick International and Metro-Goldwyn-Mayer**; Dark Victory – David Lewis for Warner Bros.; Goodbye, Mr. Chips – Victor Saville for Metro-Goldwyn-Mayer; Love Affair – Leo McCarey for RKO Radio; Mr. Smith Goes to Washington – Frank Capra for Columbia; Ninotchka – Sidney Franklin for Metro-Goldwyn-Mayer; Of Mice and Men – Lewis Milestone for Hal Roach Prod. and United Artists; Stagecoach – Walter Wanger for United Artists; The Wizard of Oz – Mervyn LeRoy for Metro-Goldwyn-Mayer; Wuthering Heights – Samuel Goldwyn for Samuel Goldwyn Prod. and United Artists	**Best Directing**: **Victor Fleming – Gone With the Wind**; Sam Wood – Goodbye, Mr. Chips; Frank Capra – Mr. Smith Goes to Washington; John Ford – Stagecoach; William Wyler – Wuthering Heights
**Best Actor**: **Robert Donat – Goodbye, Mr. Chips as Mr Chips**; Clark Gable – Gone With the Wind as Rhett Butler; Laurence Olivier – Wuthering Heights as Heathcliff; Mickey Rooney – Babes in Arms as Mickey Moran; James Stewart – Mr. Smith Goes to Washington as Jefferson "Jeff" Smith	**Best Actress**: **Vivien Leigh – Gone With the Wind as Scarlett O'Hara**; Bette Davis – Dark Victory as Judith Traherne; Irene Dunne – Love Affair as Terry McKay; Greta Garbo – Ninotchka as Nina Ivanovna 'Ninotchka' Yakushova; Greer Garson – Goodbye, Mr. Chips as Katherine
**Best Actor in a Supporting Role**: **Thomas Mitchell – Stagecoach as Doc Boone**; Brian Aherne – Juarez as Maximilian I of Mexico; Harry Carey – Mr. Smith Goes to Washington as President of the Senate; Brian Donlevy – Beau Geste as Sergeant Markoff; Claude Rains – Mr. Smith Goes to Washington as Senator Joseph Harrison "Joe" Paine	**Best Actress in a Supporting Role**: **Hattie McDaniel – Gone With the Wind as Mammy**; Olivia de Havilland – Gone with the Wind as Melanie Hamilton; Geraldine Fitzgerald – Wuthering Heights as Isabella Linton; Edna May Oliver – Drums Along the Mohawk as Mrs. McKlennar; Maria Ouspenskaya – Love Affair as Grandmother Janou
**Best Writing (Original Story)**: **Mr. Smith Goes to Washington – Lewis R. Foster**; Bachelor Mother – Felix Jackson; Love Affair – Mildred Cram and Leo McCarey; Ninotchka – Melchior Lengyel; Young Mr. Lincoln – Lamar Trotti	**Best Writing (Screenplay)**: **Gone With the Wind – Sidney Howard (posthumous award), based on the novel by Margaret Mitchell**; Goodbye, Mr. Chips – Eric Maschwitz, R. C. Sherriff and Claudine West, based on the novel by James Hilton; Mr. Smith Goes to Washington – Sidney Buchman, based on a story by Lewis R. Foster; Ninotchka – Charles Brackett, Walter Reisch, and Billy Wilder, based on a story by Melchior Lengyel; Wuthering Heights – Ben Hecht and Charles MacArthur, based on the novel by Emily Brontë
**Best Short Subject (One-Reel)**: **Busy Little Bears – Paramount Pictures**; Information Please – RKO Radio; Prophet Without Honor – MGM; Sword Fishing – Warner Bros.	**Best Short Subject (Two-Reel)**: **Sons of Liberty – Warner Bros.**; Drunk Driving – MGM; Five Times Five – RKO Radio
**Best Short Subject (Cartoon)**: **The Ugly Duckling – Walt Disney Productions and RKO Radio**; Detouring America – Warner Bros.; Peace on Earth – MGM; The Pointer – Walt Disney Productions and RKO Radio	**Best Music (Original Score)**: **The Wizard of Oz – Herbert Stothart**; Dark Victory – Max Steiner; Eternally Yours – Werner Janssen; Golden Boy – Victor Young; Gone With the Wind – Max Steiner; Gulliver's Travels – Victor Young; The Man in the Iron Mask – Lud Gluskin and Lucien Moraweck; Man of Conquest – Victor Young; Nurse Edith Cavell – Anthony Collins; Of Mice and Men – Aaron Copland; The Rains Came – Alfred Newman; Wuthering Heights – Alfred Newman
**Best Music (Scoring)**: **Stagecoach – Richard Hageman, W. Franke Harling, John Leipold and Leo Shuken**; Babes in Arms – Roger Edens and Georgie Stoll; First Love – Charles Previn; The Great Victor Herbert – Phil Boutelje and Arthur Lange; The Hunchback of Notre Dame – Alfred Newman; Intermezzo – Lou Forbes; Mr. Smith Goes to Washington – Dimitri Tiomkin; Of Mice and Men – Aaron Copland; The Private Lives of Elizabeth and Essex – Erich Wolfgang Korngold; She Married a Cop – Cy Feuer; Swanee River – Louis Silvers; They Shall Have Music – Alfred Newman; Way Down South – Victor Young	**Best Music (Song)**: **"Over the Rainbow" from The Wizard of Oz – Music by Harold Arlen; Lyrics by Yip Harburg**; "Faithful Forever" from Gulliver's Travels – Music by Ralph Rainger; Lyrics by Leo Robin; "I Poured My Heart Into a Song" from Second Fiddle – Music and Lyrics by Irving Berlin; "Wishing" from Love Affair – Music and Lyrics by Buddy DeSylva
**Best Sound Recording**: **When Tomorrow Comes – Bernard B. Brown**; Balalaika – Douglas Shearer; Gone With the Wind – Thomas T. Moulton; Goodbye, Mr. Chips – A. W. Watkins; The Great Victor Herbert – Loren L. Ryder; The Hunchback of Notre Dame – John O. Aalberg; Man of Conquest – Charles L. Lootens; Mr. Smith Goes to Washington – John P. Livadary; Of Mice and Men – Elmer Raguse; The Private Lives of Elizabeth and Essex – Nathan Levinson; The Rains Came – Edmund H. Hansen	**Best Art Direction**: **Gone With the Wind – Lyle R. Wheeler**; Beau Geste – Hans Dreier and Robert Odell; Captain Fury – Charles D. Hall; First Love – Jack Otterson and Martin Obzina; Love Affair – Van Nest Polglase and Alfred Herman; Man of Conquest – John Victor Mackay; Mr. Smith Goes to Washington – Lionel Banks; The Private Lives of Elizabeth and Essex – Anton Grot; The Rains Came – William S. Darling and George Dudley; Stagecoach – Alexander Toluboff; The Wizard of Oz – Cedric Gibbons and William A. Horning; Wuthering Heights – James Basevi
**Best Cinematography (Black-and-White)**: **Wuthering Heights – Gregg Toland**; Stagecoach – Bert Glennon	**Best Cinematography (Color)**: **Gone With the Wind – Ernest Haller and Ray Rennahan**; The Private Lives of Elizabeth and Essex – Sol Polito and W. Howard Greene
**Best Film Editing**: **Gone With the Wind – Hal C. Kern and James E. Newcom**; Goodbye, Mr. Chips – Charles Frend; Mr. Smith Goes to Washington – Gene Havlick and Al Clark; The Rains Came – Barbara McLean; Stagecoach – Otho Lovering and Dorothy Spencer	**Best Special Effects**: **The Rains Came – E. H. Hansen and Fred Sersen**; Gone With the Wind – John R. Cosgrove, Fred Albin and Arthur Johns; Only Angels Have Wings – Roy Davidson and Edwin C. Hahn; The Private Lives of Elizabeth and Essex – Byron Haskin and Nathan Levinson; Topper Takes a Trip – Roy Seawright; Union Pacific – Farciot Edouart, Gordon Jennings and Loren L. Ryder; The Wizard of Oz – A. Arnold Gillespie and Douglas Shearer

=== Special awards ===
- To Douglas Fairbanks, recognizing the unique and outstanding contribution of Douglas Fairbanks, first President of the Academy, to the international development of the motion picture.
- To The Motion Picture Relief Fund, acknowledging the outstanding services to the industry during the past year of the Motion Picture Relief Fund and its progressive leadership. Presented to Jean Hersholt, President; Ralph Morgan, Chairman of the Executive Committee; Ralph Block, First Vice-President; and Conrad Nagel.
- To Judy Garland for her outstanding performance as a screen juvenile during the past year.
- To William Cameron Menzies for outstanding achievement in the use of color for the enhancement of dramatic mood in the production of Gone with the Wind.
- To the Technicolor Company for its contributions in successfully bringing three-color feature production to the screen.

=== Irving G. Thalberg Memorial Award ===
- David O. Selznick

== Multiple nominations and awards ==
Films with multiple nominations
Nominations	Film
13	Gone with the Wind
11	Mr. Smith Goes to Washington
8	Wuthering Heights
7	Goodbye, Mr. Chips
7	Stagecoach
6	Love Affair
6	The Wizard of Oz
5	The Private Lives of Elizabeth and Essex
5	The Rains Came
4	Ninotchka
4	Of Mice and Men
3	Dark Victory
3	Man of Conquest
2	Babes in Arms
2	Beau Geste
2	First Love
2	The Great Victor Herbert
2	Gulliver's Travels
2	The Hunchback of Notre Dame

Films with multiple awards
Awards	Film
8	Gone with the Wind
2	Stagecoach
2	The Wizard of Oz

== Presenters and performers ==
The ceremony presenters are listed below in the sequence of awards presented.

Presenter	Award(s)
Darryl F. Zanuck	Scientific and Technical Awards, Film Editing, Sound Recording, Cinematography, Art Direction, and Special Effects
Gene Buck	Music awards
Bob Hope	Short-subject awards
Mickey Rooney	Special Juvenile Academy Award to Judy Garland
Mervyn LeRoy	Best Director
Sinclair Lewis	Writing awards
Y. Frank Freeman	Best Picture
Basil O'Connor	Special awards to Jean Hersholt, Ralph Morgan, Ralph Block, and Conrad Nagel
Dr. Ernest Martin Hopkins	Irving Thalberg Award
Walter Wanger	Commemorative award to Douglas Fairbanks
Fay Bainter	Supporting Actor and Actress
Spencer Tracy	Best Actor and Actress

== Ceremony information ==
=== The lead-up to the awards ===
Prior to the announcement of nominations, Mr. Smith Goes to Washington and Gone with the Wind were the two films most widely tipped to receive a significant number of nominations. Mr. Smith Goes to Washington premiered in Washington with a premier party hosted by the National Press Club who found themselves portrayed unfavourably in the film; the film's theme of political corruption was condemned and the film was denounced in the U.S. Senate. Joseph P. Kennedy, the U.S. Ambassador to Britain urged President Franklin D. Roosevelt and the studio head Harry Cohn to cease showing the film overseas because "it will cause our allies to view us in an unfavourable light". Among those who campaigned in favour of the film were Hedda Hopper who declared it "as great as Lincoln's Gettysburg speech", while Sheilah Graham called it the "best talking picture ever made". Screen Book magazine stated that it "should win every Academy Award". Frank Capra, the director, and James Stewart, the film's star were considered front runners to win awards.

Gone with the Wind premiered in December 1939 with a Gallup poll taken shortly before its release concluding that 56.5 million people intended to see the film. The New York Film Critics Award was given to Wuthering Heights after thirteen rounds of balloting had left the voters deadlocked between Mr. Smith Goes to Washington and Gone with the Wind. The press were divided in their support for the nominated actors. Time magazine favoured Vivien Leigh and used her portrait for their Christmas 1939 edition, and The Hollywood Reporter predicted a possible win by Leigh and Laurence Olivier with the comment that they "are, for the moment, just about the most sacred of all Hollywood's sacred cows". West Coast newspapers, particularly in Los Angeles, predicted Bette Davis would win for Dark Victory. Observing that Davis had achieved four box office successes during the year, one paper wrote, "Hollywood will stick by its favourite home-town girl, Bette Davis".

=== Ceremony ===
Capra was the incumbent President of the Academy, and in a first for Academy Awards ceremonies, sold the rights for the event to be filmed. Warner Bros. obtained the rights, for $30,000 to film the banquet and the presentation of the awards, to use as a short, and it was shot by the cinematographer Charles Rosher. Variety noted the stars in attendance were conscious of being filmed at the event for the first time and the event was marked by glamour with fashion-conscious actresses wearing the best of gowns, furs and jewellery.

The Los Angeles Times printed a substantially accurate list of winners, despite a promise to withhold the results of the voting, so many of the nominees learned before arriving at the ceremony who had won. Among these were Clark Gable and Bette Davis.

Following the banquet, Capra opened proceedings at 11pm with a short speech before introducing Bob Hope who made his first appearance as host of the awards. Looking at a table laden with awards awaiting presentation, he quipped, "I feel like I'm in Bette Davis' living room". Mickey Rooney presented an Academy Juvenile Award to Judy Garland, who then performed "Over the Rainbow", a "Best Song" nominee from The Wizard of Oz.

As the evening progressed, Gone with the Wind won the majority of awards, and Bob Hope remarked to David O. Selznick, "David, you should have brought roller skates". Making a speech, Selznick paused to extend praise and gratitude to Olivia de Havilland, a "Best Supporting Actress" nominee, and made it clear in his speech he knew she had not won. Fay Bainter presented the awards for Best Supporting Actor and Actress, prefacing her presentation of the latter award with the knowing comment, "It is a tribute to a country where people are free to honor noteworthy achievements regardless of creed, race or color". Hattie McDaniel became the first black performer to win an Academy Award and in expressing her gratitude promised to be "a credit to my race" before bursting into tears. De Havilland was among those to make their way to McDaniel's table to offer congratulations, though it was reported de Havilland then fled to the kitchen, where she burst into tears. The press reported an irritated David O. Selznick followed her, and shook her before she composed herself and returned to her table. Incidentally, movie historian (and future Turner Classic Movies host) Robert Osborne once reported that "not once did anyone mention the name of Margaret Mitchell, the small woman who had simply written the book on which the victorious movie was based."

Robert Donat, the winner for "Best Actor", was one of three nominated actors not present (the others were Irene Dunne and Greta Garbo). Accepting the award for Donat, Spencer Tracy said he was sure Donat's win was welcomed by "the entire motion-picture industry" before presenting the "Best Actress" award to Vivien Leigh. The press noted Bette Davis was among those waiting to congratulate Leigh as she returned to her table.

=== Post-awards discussion ===
Further controversy erupted following the ceremony, with the Los Angeles Times reporting that Leigh had won over Davis by the smallest of margins and that Donat had likewise won over James Stewart by a small number of votes. This led Academy officials to examine ways that the voting process, and more importantly, the results, would remain secret in future years. They considered the Los Angeles Times publication of such details as a breach of faith.

Hattie McDaniel received considerable attention from the press with Daily Variety writing, "Not only was she the first of her race to receive an Award, but she was also the first Negro ever to sit at an Academy banquet".

Carole Lombard was quoted as comforting Gable after his loss, with the comment "Don't worry, Pappy. We'll bring one home next year". Gable replied that he felt this had been his last chance to which Lombard was said to have replied, "Not you, you self-centered bastard. I meant me."

== See also ==
- 1939 in film
- List of oldest and youngest Academy Award winners and nominees
