= Maurice Moscovich =

American actor

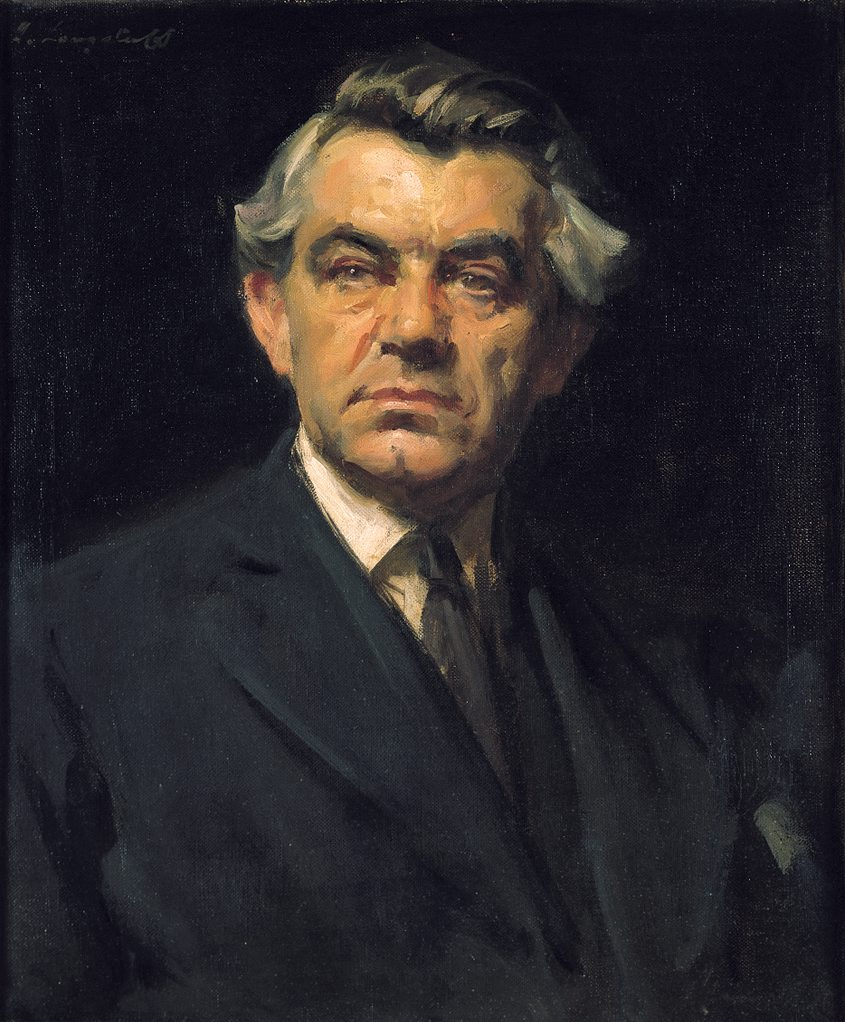
- Portrait of Mosckovitch, by John Longstaff
- Born: Morris Maaskov; November 23, 1871; Odessa, Russian Empire
- Died: June 18, 1940 (aged 68); Los Angeles, California, U.S.
- Resting place: Hollywood Forever Cemetery
- Years active: 1936–1940
- Spouse: Rose Moscovich
- Children: 3, including Noel Madison

Maurice Moscovich (born Morris Maaskov; November 23, 1871 – June 18, 1940) was a Russian American actor who was well-known for his roles in Yiddish theatre. His 14 films, which he made at the end of his life, include Charlie Chaplin's The Great Dictator.

== Life and career ==
Maurice Moscovich was born Morris Maaskov in Odessa, Tsarist Russia. He emigrated to the United States no later than 1897 and performed for decades in the Yiddish theatre in New York and appeared in two 1930 Broadway plays.

In the last four years of his life, Moscovitch played supporting roles in 14 films. With his distinctive accent, he portrayed mostly wise and friendly old men, often with Jewish background. He played a shopkeeper in the highly praised Make Way for Tomorrow (1937) and the art dealer Maurice Cobert in Love Affair (1939) with Irene Dunne and Charles Boyer. His last film was Charlie Chaplin's Hitler-satire The Great Dictator, in which he played the Barber's friendly Jewish neighbour, Mr. Jaeckel, who flees into exile to his brother.

Maurice Moskovich died at the age of 68, following surgery. At the time of his death, he was playing the role of a dancing master in Dance, Girl, Dance. His role had to be quickly rewritten for actress Maria Ouspenskaya. He is buried with his wife Rose (1872–1944) at the Beth Olam Cemetery in Hollywood. The couple had three sons, including actor Noel Madison (1897-1975).

== Filmography ==
Year	Title	Role	Notes
1936	Winterset	Esdras	
1937	Make Way for Tomorrow	Max Rubens	
1937	Lancer Spy	Gen. Von Meinhardt	
1938	Gateway	Grandpa Hlawek	
1938	Suez	Mohammed Ali	
1939	Love Affair	Maurice Cobert	
1939	Susannah of the Mounties	Chief Big Eagle	
1939	In Name Only	Dr. Muller	
1939	Rio	Old Convict	
1939	The Great Commandment	Lamech	
1939	Everything Happens at Night	Dr. Hugo Norden	
1940	South to Karanga	Paul Stacco	
1940	The Great Dictator	Mr. Jaeckel	
