= Roy Davidson =

Roy Davidson may refer to:

- Roy Davidson (politician) (1906–1999), Canadian farmer and provincial politician
- Roy Davidson (special effects artist) (1896–1962), American special effects artist
