= George Dudley (art director) =

American art director

- Born: May 8, 1897; Michigan
- Died: June 5, 1959 (aged 62); Los Angeles, California
- Occupation: Art director
- Years active: 1937-1942

George Dudley (May 8, 1897 – June 5, 1959) was an American art director. He was nominated an Academy Award in the category of Best Art Direction for the film The Rains Came.

== Filmography ==
- The Caribbean Mystery (1945)
- To the Shores of Tripoli (1942)
- The Bride Wore Crutches (1941)
- Chad Hanna (1940)
- Street of Memories (1940)
- Manhattan Heartbeat (1940)
- On Their Own (1940)
- High School (1940)
- The Man Who Wouldn't Talk (1940)
- Too Busy to Work (1939)
- The Rains Came (1939)
- Stanley and Livingstone (1939)
- Jesse James (1939)
