= Edwin C. Hahn =

American sound engineer (1888–1942)

- Born: August 2, 1888; Maryland, United States
- Died: June 1, 1942 (aged 53); Los Angeles, California, United States
- Occupation: Sound engineer
- Years active: 1939

Edwin C. Hahn (August 2, 1888 – June 1, 1942) was an American sound engineer. He was nominated for an Oscar for Best Special Effects on the film Only Angels Have Wings at the 12th Academy Awards.
