= Robert Odell =

American art director (1896–1984)

- Born: May 4, 1896; Los Angeles, California
- Died: February 20, 1984 (aged 87); Los Angeles, California
- Occupation: Art director
- Years active: 1920-1940

Robert Odell (May 4, 1896 – February 20, 1984) was an American art director. He was nominated an Academy Award in the category Best Art Direction for the film Beau Geste.

== Selected filmography ==
- Beau Geste (1939)
