= Alfred Herman =

American art director

- Born: September 8, 1889; New York City, New York, U.S.
- Died: December 1973 (aged 84); Los Angeles, California, U.S.
- Occupation: Art director
- Years active: 1933 - 1952

Alfred Herman (September 8, 1889 – December 1973) was an American art director. He was nominated for an Academy Award in the category of Best Art Direction for the film Love Affair.

== Selected filmography ==
- Love Affair (1939)
