= Dance, Girl, Dance =

1940 film by Dorothy Arzner

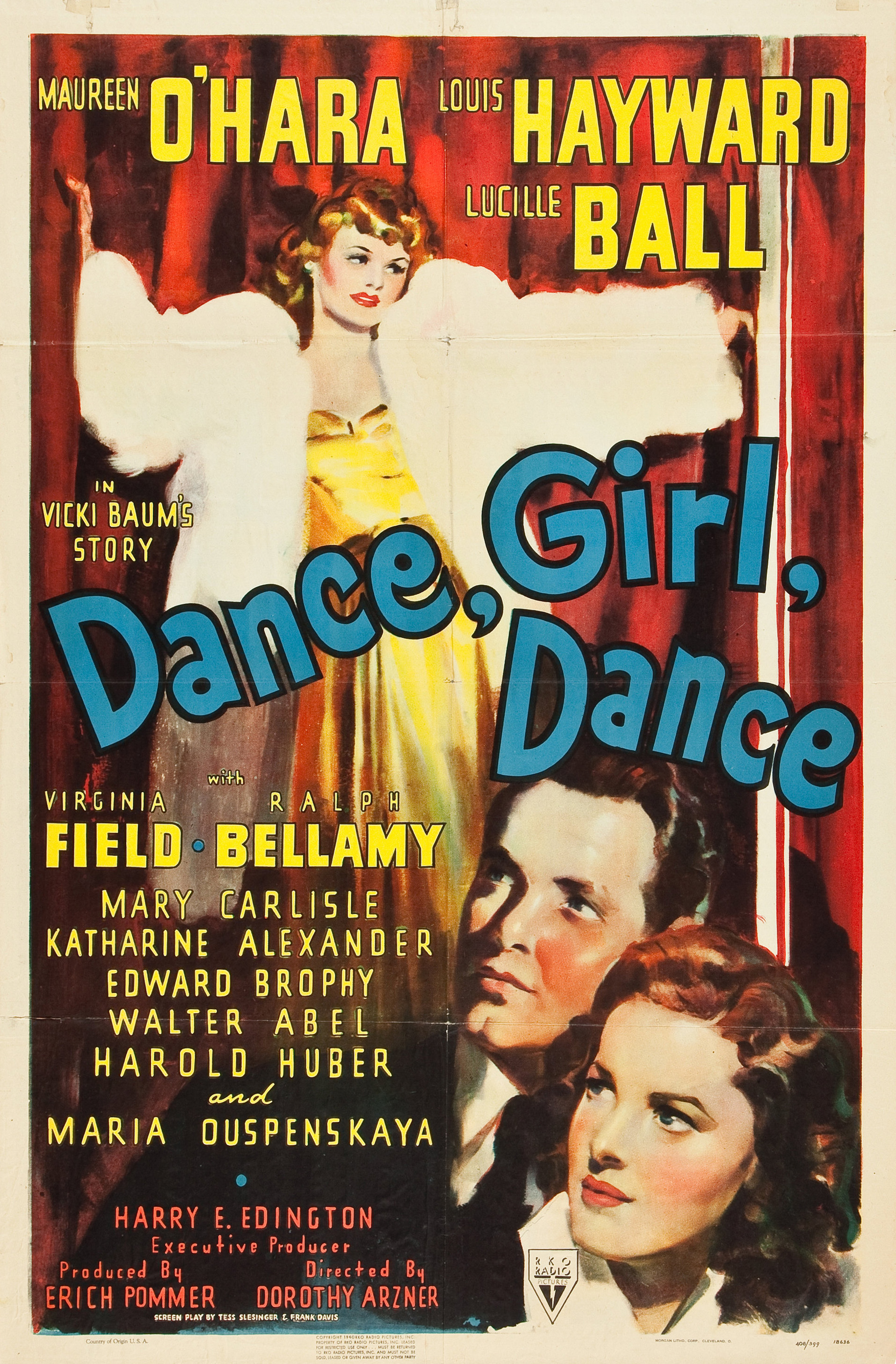
- Theatrical release poster
- Directed by: Dorothy Arzner
- Screenplay by: Frank Davis; Tess Slesinger
- Story by: Vicki Baum
- Produced by: Erich Pommer
- Starring: Maureen O'Hara; Louis Hayward; Lucille Ball; Ralph Bellamy
- Cinematography: Russell Metty; Joseph H. August
- Edited by: Robert Wise
- Music by: Edward Ward
- Distributed by: RKO Radio Pictures
- Release date: August 30, 1940
- Running time: 90 minutes
- Country: United States
- Language: English

Dance, Girl, Dance is a 1940 American comedy-drama film directed by Dorothy Arzner and starring Maureen O'Hara, Louis Hayward, Lucille Ball, and Ralph Bellamy. The film follows two dancers who strive to preserve their own integrity while fighting for their place in the spotlight and for the affections of a wealthy young suitor.

In the decades following its release, the film was the subject of critical reassessment and began to garner a reputation as a feminist film. In 2007, it was selected for preservation in the United States National Film Registry by the Library of Congress as being "culturally, historically, or aesthetically significant", describing it as Arzner's "most intriguing film" and a "meditation on the disparity between art and commerce.

Dance, Girl, Dance was edited by Robert Wise, whose next film as editor was Citizen Kane and who later won Oscars as director of West Side Story and The Sound of Music.

== Plot ==
While dancing at the Palais Royale in Akron, Ohio, Bubbles, a cynical blonde chorine, and Judy O'Brien, an aspiring young ballerina, meet Jimmy Harris, the scion of a wealthy family. Both women are attracted to Jimmy, a tormented young man who is still in love with his estranged wife, Elinor.

Back in New York, Bubbles finds work in a burlesque club, while Madame Basilova, the girls' teacher and manager, arranges an audition for Judy with ballet impresario Steve Adams. En route to the audition, Madame Basilova is struck by a car and killed, and Judy, intimidated by the other dancers, flees before she can meet Steve. As she leaves the building, Judy shares an elevator with Steve, who offers her a cab ride, but she is unaware of who he is and rejects his offer.

Soon after, Bubbles, now called "Tiger Lily, the burlesque queen", offers Judy a job as her stooge in the Bailey Brothers burlesque show and, desperate, Judy accepts. One night, both Jimmy and Steve attend the performance, and Judy leaves with Jimmy and tears up the card that Steve left for her. The next night, while at a nightclub with Judy, Jimmy has a fistfight with his ex-wife's new husband, and the next day their pictures appear in the newspaper. Bubbles, furious with Judy for stealing Jimmy, appears at the girl's apartment, where she finds Jimmy drunk on the doorstep and sweeps him away to the marriage bureau.

Meanwhile, Steve's secretary, Miss Olmstead, also sees Judy's picture in the paper and identifies her as the dancer who had come to audition. That night, Steve attends Judy's performance at which the audience is given a lecture by Judy about the evils of viewing women as objects. This is followed by a fight between her and Bubbles over Jimmy. Hauled into night court, Judy is sentenced to ten days in jail but is bailed out by Steve. The next day, when Judy goes to meet her benefactor, she recognizes Steve, who hails her as his new discovery and promises to make her a star.

== Cast ==
- Maureen O'Hara as Judy O'Brien
- Louis Hayward as James 'Jimmy' Harris Jr.
- Lucille Ball as Bubbles/Tiger Lily White
- Virginia Field as Elinor Harris
- Ralph Bellamy as Steve Adams
- Maria Ouspenskaya as Madame Lydia Basilova
- Mary Carlisle as Sally
- Katharine Alexander as Miss Olmstead
- Edward Brophy as Dwarfie Humblewinger
- Walter Abel as Judge
- Harold Huber as Kashulian
- Sidney Blackmer as Puss in Boots
- Ludwig Stössel as Caesar
- Harry Tenbrook as Spectator (uncredited)
- Vivian Fay as The Ballerina

== Music ==
Aiming for musical authenticity, studio music head Dave Dreyer used a variety of instrumentalists: 50 studio players for the big ballet, but then the Leon Taz South American tango band for the Club Ferdinand, a "Negro jive band of 12 pieces" for the Palais Royale chorus number, and a "mixed orchestra of 25 pieces for the Bailey Brothers Burlesque sequence."

== Release ==
=== Box office ===
The film was a critical and commercial failure, and its theatrical release lost RKO Studios roughly $400,000.

=== Critical response ===
Writing for The New York Times, Bosley Crowther panned the film, noting that, "with the exception of Maureen O'Hara, who is sincere but badly miscast, the roles are competently filled and the film pretentiously staged, Dance, Girl, Dance is just a cliché-ridden, garbled repetition of the story of the aches and pains in a dancer's rise to fame and fortune. It's a long involved tale told by a man who stutters... Nevertheless, it is Miss Ball who brings an occasional zest into the film, especially that appearance in the burlesque temple where she stripteases the Hays office. But it isn't art."

The Chicago Tribune thought the film "interesting and different. It has lots of dancing, both high and low class, with Maureen scaling the heights as it were and Lucille Ball niftily impersonating a lowbrow terpsichore....the two so different maidens are excellently played....Supporting players are able and alert. Staging is tops and direction was comprehending."

Time magazine wrote: "'Dance, Girl, Dance' solemnly relates a jumbled account of the trials & tribulations borne by pretty showgirls. A well-turned strip-teaseuse...rooms with an earnest, apple-cheeked ballerina....Lucille wants money, Maureen success. Lucille winds up draped in furs and sparkling gewgaws but with no suggestion of purity. Maureen winds up with a job in the American Ballet after teary, trying weeks capering to the jibes of burlesque fans. Contrary to all Hollywood tradition, neither winds up with a man when the alcoholic playboy they both want...is dragged off into an elevator by his former wife."

The Atlanta Constitution singled out Ball's work: "Burlesque nearly got back in Atlanta yesterday—and, cleaned up enough to pass screen censors, it did. The new queen of the disrobing art is Lucille Ball, whose act is no more shocking than the wind machines at Coney Island....Her performances of the tough, anti-puritan show girl who believes in eating should put her name in line for better pictures. She takes the whole show from the much-publicized, and lovely, Maureen O'Hara."

For the New York Sun, the film was "a pleasant enough piece of entertainment....[it] goes a little haywire sometimes in the emotional scenes, probably because the beautiful Maureen O'Hara seems to have learned nothing at all about acting. It is an ambitious production, with ballets and snatches of a burlesque show. It does not always succeed as drama. It does prove diverting most of the time....[but] is complicated, much too complicated, by several heavy romances. Like most Vicki Baum stories, the plot is elaborate. This slows up the drama, making it occasionally ponderous. Maria Ouspenskaya, in a few vivid scenes, makes her best part the most interesting in the film. Lucille Ball is entertaining...Virginia Field believable...Louis Hayward not too exuberant. The burlesque show scenes are skillfully done and amusing. 'Dance, Girl, Dance' is far above the standard of pictures usually as first-run features at the Palace. When it gets emotional, however, it tends to be overheavy."

Upon the film's release, BoxOffice magazine summarized U.S. trade reviews as follows: Harrison's Reports, Very Good; BoxOffice, Showmen's Trade Review, Film Daily: Good; Variety, Hollywood Reporter, Hollywood Variety: Fair.

==== Modern assessment ====
Beginning in the 1970s, Dance, Girl, Dance enjoyed a popular revival and critical reassessment. Its resurgence has been ascribed to the burgeoning feminist movement which saw the film as a rare example of empowered women. Critical praise for the film has endured – in 2002 Dance, Girl, Dance was listed among the Top 100 "Essential Films" of the National Society of Film Critics.

Alicia Fletcher, writing for the Toronto International Film Festival, deemed the film "A bone fide feminist masterpiece." Richard Brody of The New Yorker wrote: "The movie lives up to its title—its subject really is dancing. Arzner films it with fascination and enthusiasm, and the choreography is marked by the point of view of the spectators and the dancers’ awareness that they're being watched. Arzner—one of the few women directors in Hollywood—shows women dancers enduring men's slobbering stares. The very raison d’être of these women's performances is to titillate men, and that's where the story's two vectors intersect—art versus commerce and love versus lust. This idealistic paean to the higher realms of creative and romantic fulfillment is harshly realistic about the degradations that women endure in base entertainments."

== See also ==
- List of cult films
