= Roy Davidson (special effects artist) =

- Born: March 3, 1896
- Died: August 19, 1962 (aged 66); Los Angeles, California, United States
- Occupation: Special effects artist
- Years active: 1932-1949

Roy Davidson (March 3, 1896 – August 19, 1962) was an American special effects artist. He was nominated an Oscar for Best Special Effects for the film Only Angels Have Wings at the 12th Academy Awards.
