= Only Angels Have Wings =

1939 film by Howard Hawks

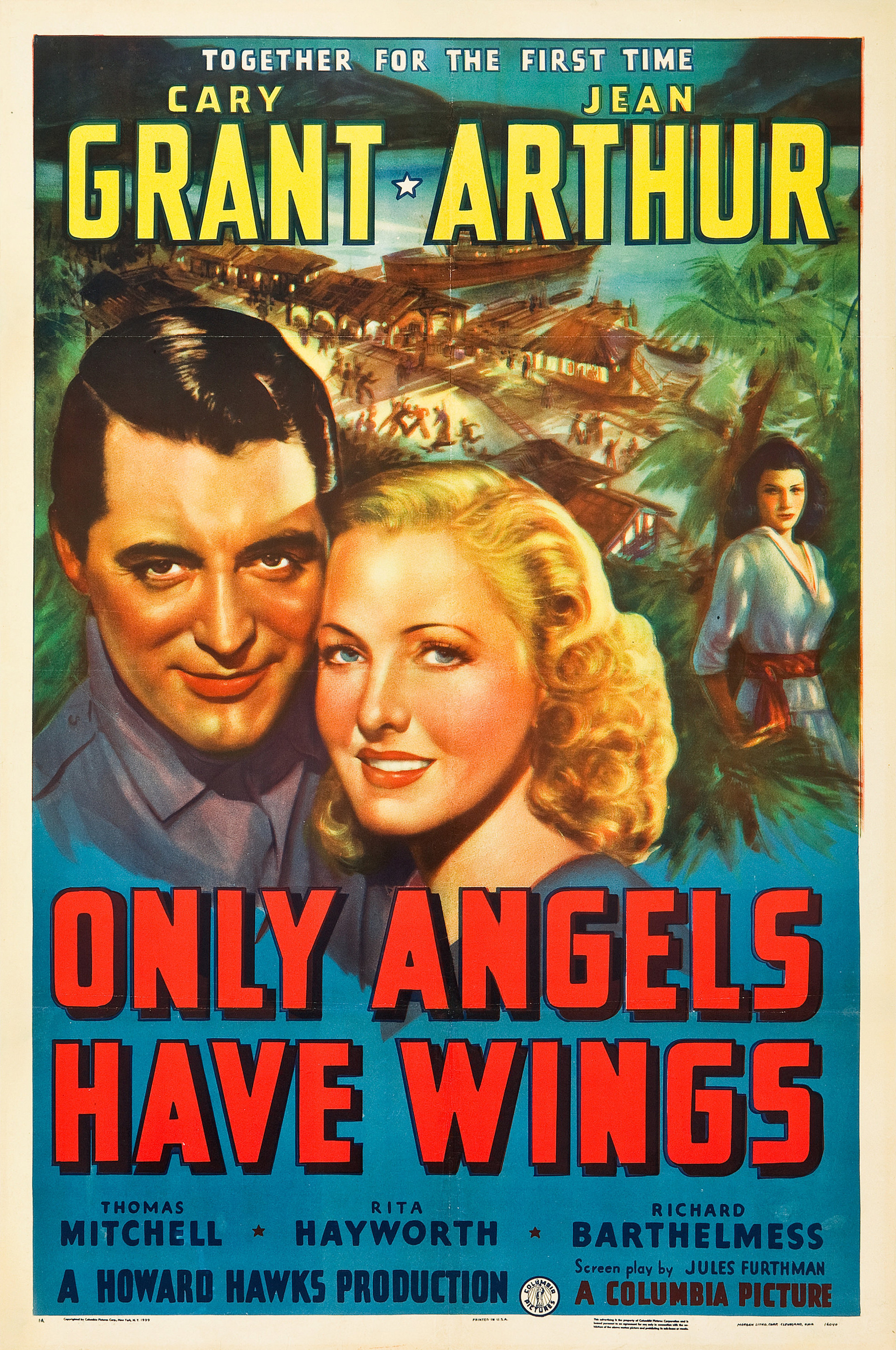
- Theatrical release poster
- Directed by: Howard Hawks
- Screenplay by: Jules Furthman
- Story by: Howard Hawks
- Starring: Cary Grant; Jean Arthur; Thomas Mitchell; Rita Hayworth; Richard Barthelmess; Noah Beery Jr.
- Cinematography: Joseph Walker
- Edited by: Viola Lawrence
- Music by: Dimitri Tiomkin
- Production company: Columbia Pictures
- Distributed by: Columbia Pictures
- Release date: May 15, 1939
- Running time: 121 minutes
- Country: United States
- Language: English
- Box office: $1 million

Only Angels Have Wings is a 1939 American adventure romantic drama film directed by Howard Hawks. Starring Cary Grant and Jean Arthur, it is based on a story written by Hawks.

The plot follows the manager of an air freight company in a remote South American port town who is forced to risk his pilots' lives while vying for a major contract.

It features supporting performances from Thomas Mitchell, Richard Barthelmess, Noah Beery Jr., and Rita Hayworth in her first major role.

Released by Columbia Pictures in May 1939, the film was met with critical acclaim and is generally regarded as being among Hawks' finest films, particularly in its portrayal of the professionalism of the pilots of the film, its atmosphere, and the flying sequences.

In 2017, the film was selected for preservation in the United States National Film Registry by the Library of Congress as being "culturally, historically, or aesthetically significant".

== Plot ==
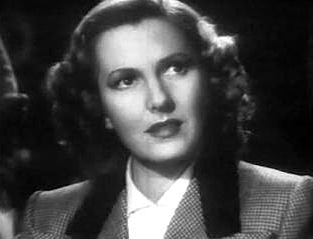
Jean Arthur as Bonnie Lee

Geoff Carter is the chief pilot and manager of Barranca Airways, a small, barely solvent company owned by "Dutchy" Van Ruyter carrying airmail from the fictional South American port town of Barranca through a high pass in the Andes Mountains. Bonnie Lee, a piano-playing entertainer, arrives on a banana boat one day. After making her acquaintance, Joe Souther crashes and dies trying to land in fog later that day. Bonnie becomes infatuated with Geoff, despite his fatalistic attitude about the dangerous flying, and stays on in Barranca (not at his invitation, as he insists on telling her).

The situation is complicated by the arrival of pilot Bat MacPherson and his wife—Geoff's old flame, Judy. MacPherson cannot find work in the United States because he once bailed out of an airplane, leaving his mechanic—the brother of "Kid" Dabb, Carter's best friend—to die in the ensuing crash. When Geoff is forced to ground the Kid because of failing eyesight, he hires MacPherson with the understanding that he will get the most dangerous assignments.

Dutchy will secure a lucrative government contract if he can provide reliable mail service during a six-month trial. On the last day of the probation period, bad weather closes the mountain pass. Geoff decides to try to fly a new Ford Trimotor over the mountains instead. The Kid asks to go with him as co-pilot. Geoff refuses, but then lets the Kid toss a coin to decide the matter. When it lands on the floor, Geoff discovers that the coin has two heads. Geoff still agrees to take him along. Just before leaving, Bonnie tries to talk Geoff out of going. She takes his gun out of his holster and points it at him. When she realizes that she cannot stop him, she drops the gun on the table, but it accidentally fires, hitting Geoff in the shoulder.

Unable to fly, Geoff lets MacPherson take his place. However, MacPherson and the Kid are unable to climb high enough; the plane stalls and drops thousands of feet before leveling off. Geoff tells them to turn around, but they decide to try to fly through the fogged-in pass. In the pass, they encounter a flock of condors. One crashes through the windshield, paralyzing the Kid, and another hits the No. 1 engine, setting it on fire. Later the No. 2 engine also catches fire. The Kid tells MacPherson to bail out, but he refuses. He turns around and returns to Barranca, managing to crash-land the burning Trimotor. The Kid dies from a broken neck, but not before telling Geoff what MacPherson did. As a result, MacPherson is finally accepted by the other pilots.

Bonnie is torn between leaving and staying, and confronts Geoff in the hope he will ask her to stay. However, with mere hours to spare on the trial period, the weather clears and Geoff has to rush off to secure the all-important contract. Before he goes, he offers to toss a coin to decide: heads, Bonnie stays; tails, she leaves. The coin comes up heads, but Bonnie despairs that this is the result of chance, not love. Geoff leaves her with the coin. She then realizes that it is the Kid's trick double-headed coin, Geoff's way of saying he loves her. She watches as Geoff and another pilot who have just two good arms between them fly a Travel Air high-wing monoplane off the soggy runway.

== Cast ==
- Cary Grant as Geoff Carter
- Jean Arthur as Bonnie Lee
- Richard Barthelmess as Bat MacPherson
- Rita Hayworth as Judy MacPherson
- Thomas Mitchell as "Kid" Dabb
- Allyn Joslyn as Les Peters
- Sig Ruman as John "Dutchy" Van Ruyter
- Victor Kilian as "Sparks" Reynolds
- John Carroll as "Gent" Shelton
- Don Barry as "Tex" Gordon
- Noah Beery Jr. as Joe Souther
- Manuel Álvarez Maciste as the singer
- Milissa Sierra as Lily
- Lucio Villegas as Doctor
- Pat Flaherty as Mike
- Pedro Regas as Pancho
- Pat West as Baldy
- Charles R. Moore as Charlie

== Production ==
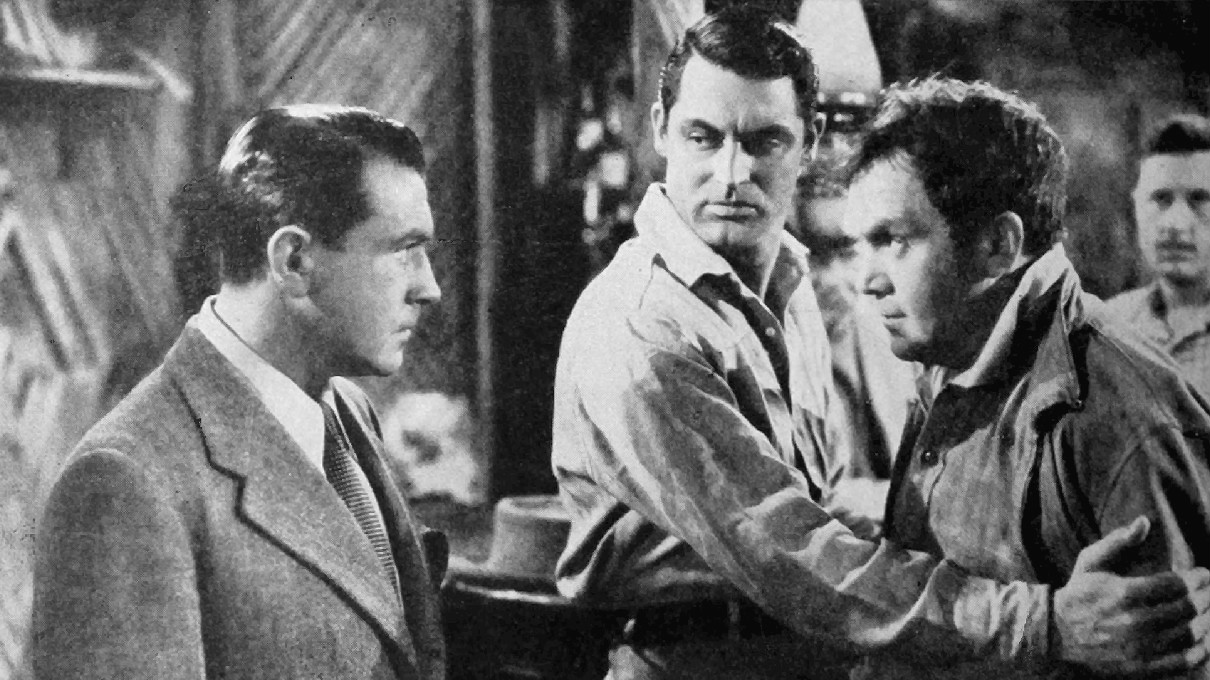
Promotional photo of Richard Barthelmess, Cary Grant and Thomas Mitchell

=== Pre-production and casting ===
The film's original script outline was written by Anne Wigton; the working title originally was Plane No. 4. Howard Hawks re-wrote the film's scenario himself, based on a story that he wrote in 1938 titled Plane from Barranca. While he was scouting locations several years earlier, for the filming of Viva Villa!, Hawks had been especially inspired by the stoic aviation personnel that he had met in Mexico. The film's final script was written and re-written throughout the film's production, mostly by Hawks and Jules Furthman, but also with contributions by Eleanore Griffin and William Rankin.

Hawks had previously worked with Cary Grant the year before on Bringing Up Baby and this was the second of five collaborations between the director and the star.

He cast Jean Arthur in the leading role of Bonnie Lee after appraising her acting in several films directed by Frank Capra.

Hawks then hired silent film star Richard Barthelmess for the role of Bat MacPherson. Barthelmess's career had gradually diminished since sound films became popular in the late 1920s, and he was a controversial choice, mainly because he had recently had a botched plastic surgery operation on the skin under his eyes that resulted in permanent X-shaped scars under both of his eyes. Barthelmess usually wore heavy make-up to hide the scars, but Hawks wanted to use the scars for the character.

Hawks had originally cast Dorothy Comingore in the role of Judy MacPherson, but studio head Harry Cohn had been grooming a young starlet that would be advanced for the role. With backing from Cohn, her agent then insisted that Hawks give Rita Hayworth a screen test, which eventually resulted in Hayworth being cast in the role. (Note: Although Rita Hayworth had already appeared in a dozen films with Columbia, she had not made much of an impact until her role in Only Angels Have Wings.)

=== Filming ===
Shooting of Only Angels Have Wings began on December 19, 1938, at the Columbia Studio Ranch and Hawks shot the film in chronological sequence whenever possible. Hawks and Arthur initially found working together difficult and Arthur would often argue with Hawks on set. Hawks was attempting to coach Arthur to play a variation of the classical Hawksian woman Archetype, but Arthur often felt uncomfortable with his direction. Eventually, she unhappily agreed to play the role as he directed her. Years later after Arthur saw Lauren Bacall's performance in To Have and Have Not, Arthur apologized to Hawks and told him that she finally understood what he had wanted from her (epitomized in Bacall's repetition and emphasis on the paradoxical line "I'm hard to get ... all you have to do is ask me.") Hawks later said that he considered Arthur to have been good in the film.

Initial shooting was completed on March 24, 1939, 31 days over its shooting schedule. This was followed with several weeks of second unit shooting of aircraft flying in various locations in the western United States. A few re-takes were shot in April with Cary Grant and Victor Kilian. Two days of re-shoots with Rita Hayworth were also shot, but were directed by Charles Vidor.

In a 1972 interview, Arthur revealed, "I loved sinking my head into Cary Grant's chest".

The Travel Air 6000 airliner was prominently featured against a backdrop of the Rocky Mountains, standing in for the Andes Mountains.

=== Aircraft used in the production ===
The "cast" also starred a Ford Trimotor as well as a Hamilton H-47 Metalplane, and Travel Air 6000 single engine monoplanes. All of these types accurately represented the types of aircraft flying in the period depicted by the film. The Metalplane was the airplane Joe Souther crashes while trying to land in heavy fog, and was only used for ground shots. In 2007, one of the prop models used in the simulated flying scenes for the Hamilton aircraft surfaced on an episode of the U.S. version of Antiques Roadshow; its owner had been able to screen match it, confirming its authenticity. The Travel Air was used in the exciting mine rescue flying scene, while the Ford Trimotor was featured in another dramatic landing that ends in a fiery crash. Midway through the film, Paul Mantz flew a Boeing Model 40 biplane in a spirited aerobatic performance, reprising his earlier scene in Flight from Glory. Only Angels Have Wings has become very popular among enthusiasts of the aircraft of the golden age of aviation.

== Release and reception ==
Twelve days after the film's final re-shoots were completed, Only Angels Have Wings premiered in Los Angeles at the Pantages Theater on May 10, 1939. Its official world premiere occurred the next day at Radio City Music Hall. It was heavily promoted by Columbia Studios and ended up making $143,000 on its initial two-week run at radio City Music Hall, and earned over one million dollars overall. It was the third-highest-grossing film of 1939. The film was also Rita Hayworth's breakout role and helped make her a major Hollywood star, with Hayworth appearing on the cover of Look magazine after the film's success.

Only Angels Have Wings received good reviews on its release, with Abel Green of Variety comparing it favorably to Flight From Glory and praised Barthelmess's performance. Frank S. Nugent in his review for The New York Times focused on the excitement found in the aerial scenes, also recognizing the talents of the star-studded cast, "Mr. Hawks has staged his flying sequences brilliantly ... He has made proper use of the amiable performing talents of Mr. Grant, Miss Arthur, Thomas Mitchell, Mr. Barthelmess, Sig Rumann and the rest."

Only Angels Have Wings was later selected as one of 12 films representing the U.S. at the first Cannes Film Festival. However, the festival was canceled in light of events leading up to World War II.

On the review aggregator site Rotten Tomatoes, it has a score of 100% based on 31 reviews. On Metacritic, the film holds a score of 86 out of 100, based on 10 critics, indicating "universal acclaim". Peter Bradshaw of The Guardian gave it 4/5 stars, calling it "eccentric and entertaining". Geoffrey Macnab gave a brief review for The Independent, praising the aerial sequences in particular.

=== Radio adaptations ===
Two weeks after the film's premiere, Only Angels Have Wings was adapted as a one-hour radio play for the May 29, 1939, broadcast of Lux Radio Theatre. The film's principal actors, Cary Grant, Jean Arthur, Rita Hayworth, Richard Barthelmess and Thomas Mitchell all reprised their roles. Orson Welles headlined a radio adaptation on The Campbell Playhouse on February 25, 1940, that starred Welles and Joan Blondell.

== Awards and honors ==
Roy Davidson and Edwin C. Hahn were nominated for the first-time Academy Award for Best Effects, Special Effects. Only Angels Have Wings was on a preliminary list of submissions from the studios for an Academy Award for Cinematography (Black-and-White) but was not nominated.

== Legacy ==
Only Angels Have Wings has become thought of as one of Hawks's best films, with Dave Kehr calling it the "equilibrium point" of Hawks's career, bridging themes developed in his early films of the 1930s to some of his darker films of the '40s and '50s. Film critics at Cahiers du Cinéma also praised the film in the 1950s as a quintessential support of the auteur theory. In the 2022 Sight and Sound poll to determine the greatest films of all time, Only Angels Have Wings was tied for 122nd place. The website They Shoot Pictures Don't They, which aggregates thousands of movie polls to determine the greatest films of all time, ranked the film at 175th place, after The Raiders of the Lost Ark and before another 1939 classic, Stagecoach.

== See also ==
- List of misquotations: In one scene, Cary Grant calls after Hayworth's character by saying, "Judy, Judy." This is the closest he ever came on film to the misquotation associated with him: "Judy, Judy, Judy".
- List of films with a 100% rating on Rotten Tomatoes, a film review aggregator website
- List of films considered the best
