= The Rains Came =

1939 film by Clarence Brown

- theatrical release poster
- Directed by: Clarence Brown
- Screenplay by: Philip Dunne; Julien Josephson
- Based on: The Rains Came; 1937 novel by Louis Bromfield
- Produced by: Darryl F. Zanuck
- Starring: Myrna Loy; Tyrone Power; George Brent; Brenda Joyce; Nigel Bruce; Maria Ouspenskaya
- Cinematography: Arthur C. Miller
- Edited by: Barbara McLean
- Music by: Alfred Newman
- Color process: Black and white
- Production company: 20th Century Fox
- Distributed by: 20th Century Fox
- Release date: September 7, 1939
- Running time: 103-105 minutes
- Country: United States
- Language: English
- Budget: $2.5 million

The Rains Came is a 1939 20th Century Fox film based on an American novel by Louis Bromfield (published in June 1937 by Harper & Brothers). The film was directed by Clarence Brown and stars Myrna Loy, Tyrone Power, George Brent, Brenda Joyce, Nigel Bruce, and Maria Ouspenskaya.

A remake of the film was released in 1955 under the name The Rains of Ranchipur.

== Plot ==
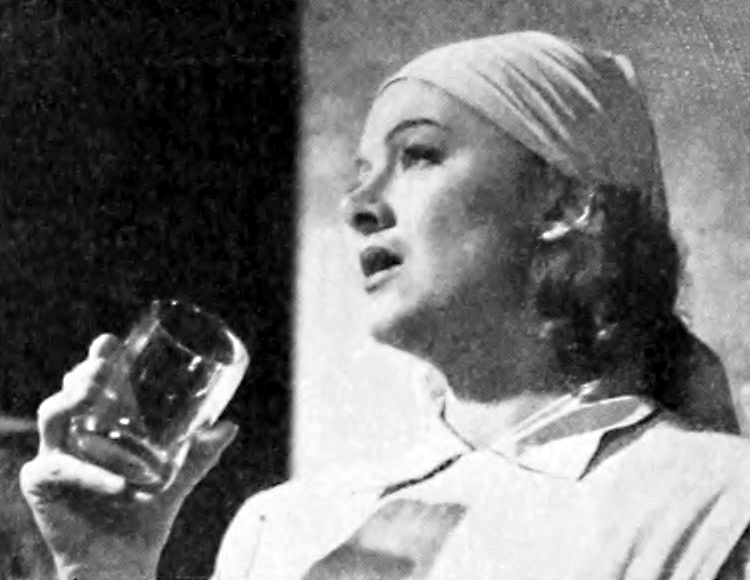
Myrna Loy as Edwina in The Rains Came

The story centers on the redemption of Lady Edwina Esketh. Tom Ransome is an artist who leads a rather dissolute and socially active life in the fictional princely state of Ranchipur, India. His routine is shattered with the arrival of Lady Edwina Esketh, his former lover, who has married the elderly Lord Esketh. Lady Edwina first tries to seduce but gradually falls in love with Major Rama Safti, who represents the "new India."

Ranchipur is devastated by an earthquake, which causes a flood, which causes a cholera epidemic. Lord Esketh dies, and Lady Esketh renounces her hedonistic life in favor of helping the sick with Major Safti. She accidentally drinks from a glass that a patient has used, becomes infected, and dies, making it possible for Safti to become the ruler of a kingdom that he presumably will reform. Throughout the story, Fern Simon, a missionary's daughter, and Ransome also fall in love.

== Cast ==
- Myrna Loy as Lady Edwina Esketh
- Tyrone Power as Major Rama Safti
- George Brent as Tom Ransome
- Brenda Joyce as Fern Simon
- Nigel Bruce as Lord Albert Esketh
- Maria Ouspenskaya as Maharani
- Joseph Schildkraut as Mr. Bannerjee
- Mary Nash as Miss MacDaid
- Jane Darwell as Aunt Phoebe – Mrs. Smiley
- Marjorie Rambeau as Mrs. Simon
- Henry Travers as Rev. Homer Smiley
- H. B. Warner as Maharajah
- Laura Hope Crews as Lily Hoggett-Egburry
- William Royle as Raschid Ali Khan
- C. Montague Shaw as General Keith
- Harry Hayden as Rev. Elmer Simon
- Herbert Evans as Bates

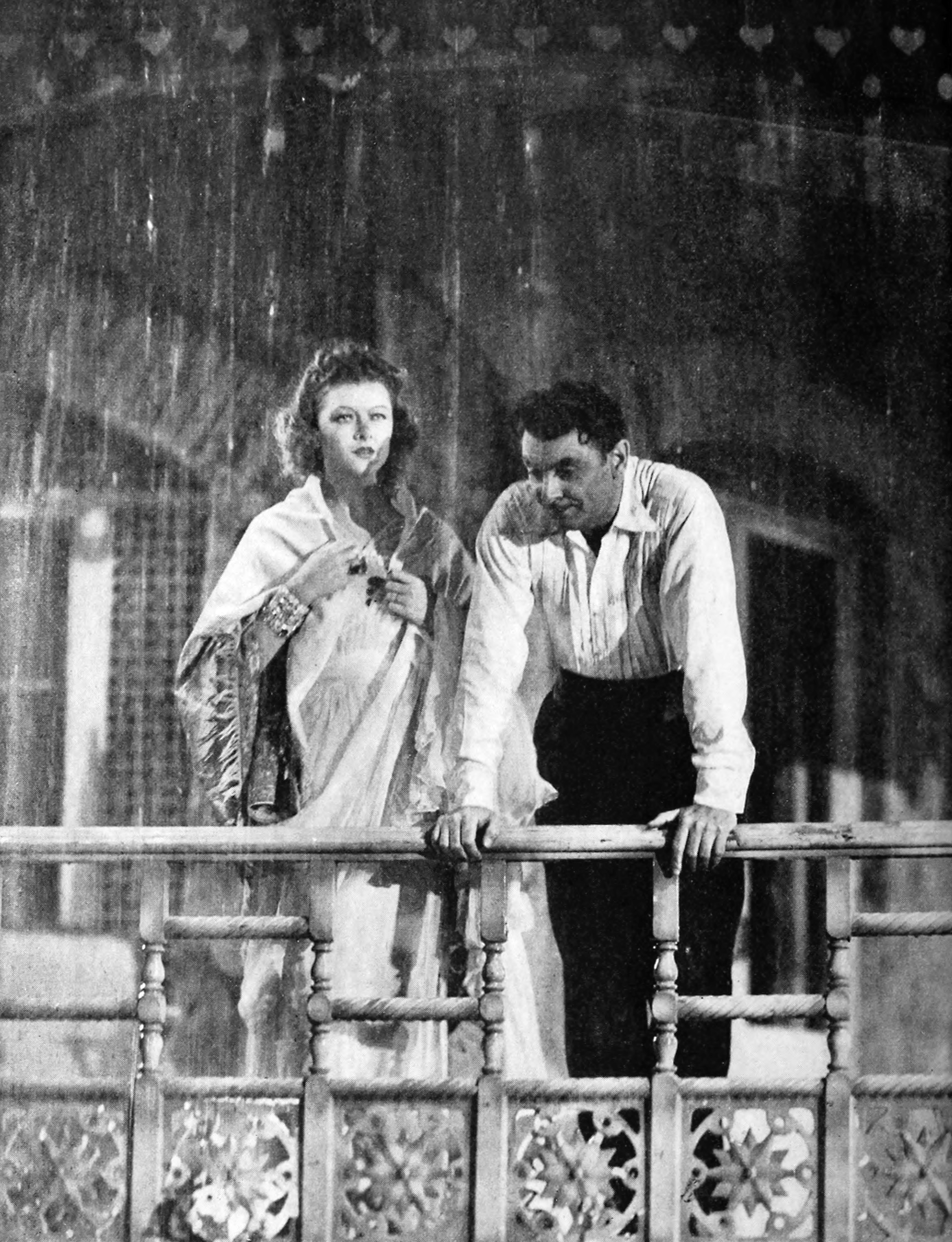
Loy and George Brent in The Rains Came

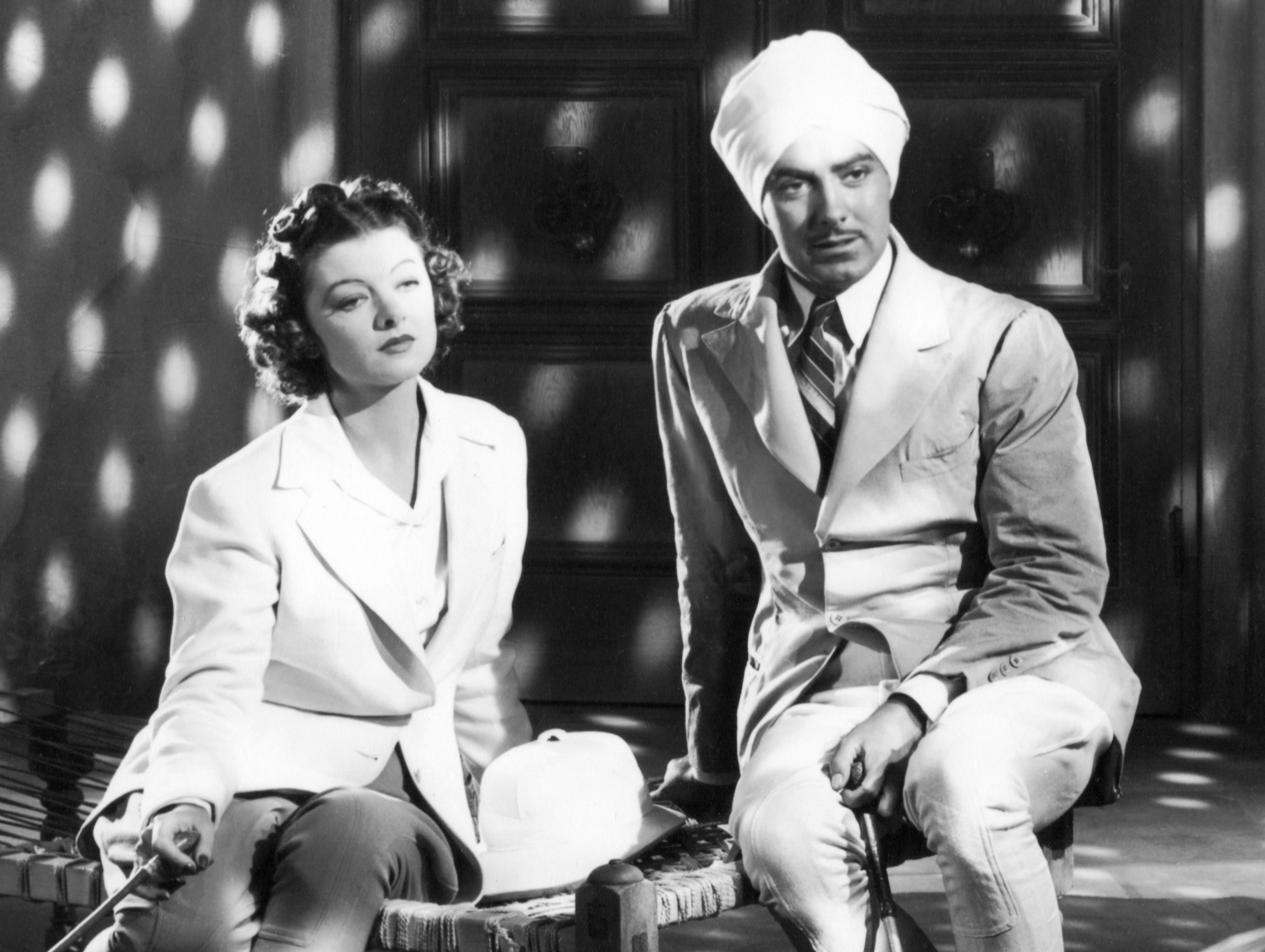
Loy and Tyrone Power in The Rains Came

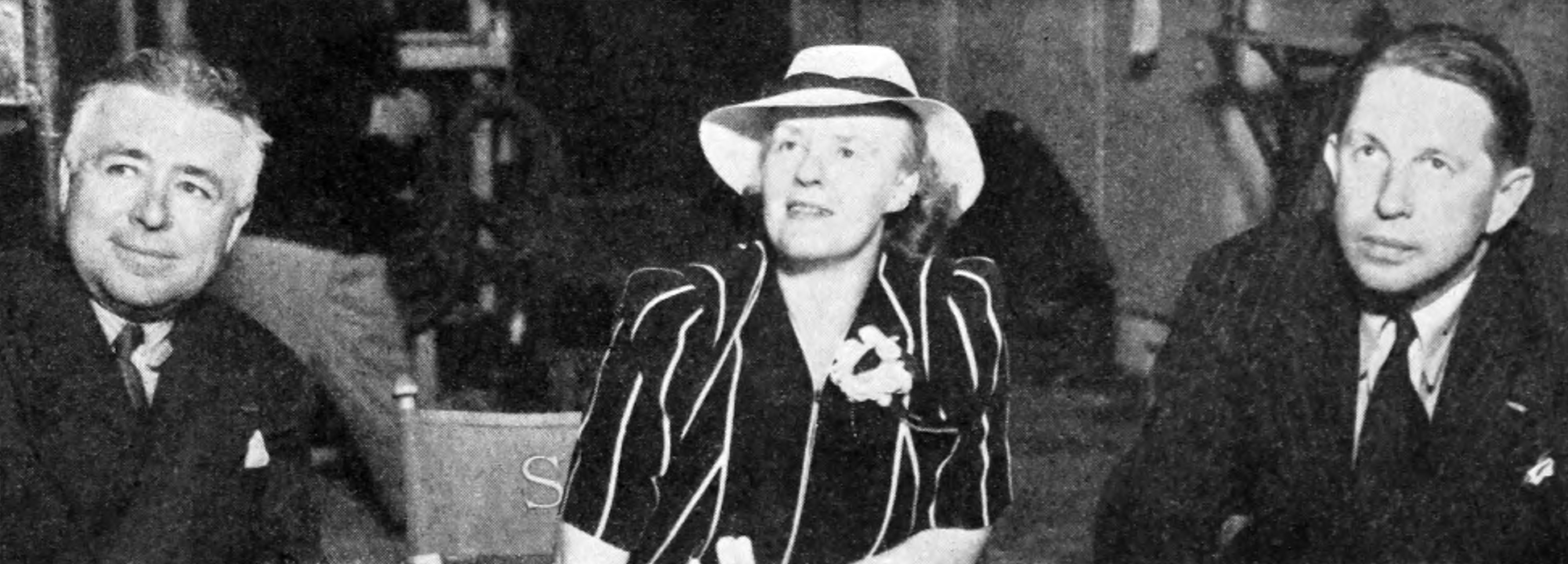
Journalist Dorothy Thompson is entertained on the set of The Rains Came by director Clarence Brown (left) and writer Louis Bromfield, on whose novel the film was based

== Casting ==
The casting apparently was a lengthy process. Loy and Brown were lent to 20th Century Fox from MGM (as part of a deal wherein Power was loaned by Fox to MGM for Marie Antoinette). Brent was also on loan from his home studio of Warner Bros. The only cast member who was chosen for the role he or she played was Ouspenskaya, who was memorable as the Maharani. She later claimed that she learned all she needed to know about impersonating Indian royalty from her acquaintance with the Russian Grand Duchess Maria Pavlovna of Russia. Nigel Bruce is cast against what had become his established type.

== Production ==
The budget was $2.5 million ($58 million in 2025).

In later years, Loy recalled that her belief in director Clarence Brown made her willing to try his suggestion for her death scene: "'people don't die with their eyes closed...Why don't you try dying with your eyes open? You've just got to hold your breath.' I held my breath, staring at some fixed object until I began to see stars and everything started to blur and run together. I was turning a little blue when he finally called 'Cut!' When you trust a director, you'll do anything for him."

Loy's stylish bad girl role harks back to the vamps, villainesses and dramatic leads she was known for until her success in The Thin Man established her comedic talent. After a series of romantic comedies, Loy wanted a good dramatic role. According to Loy, Louis Bromfield told her "I think you're giving the best performance of your career." After the Second World War and her appearance in The Best Years of Our Lives, her image changed yet again to that of the ideal mother.

The special effects that produced the earthquakes and floods won the first Oscar issued in that category (see below). However, Variety praised the human drama: "The simple heroics following the quake are more effective than the earth-rending sequences themselves."

TCM.com reports some of cinematographer Arthur Miller's recollections about The Rains Came, including his "obsession" with the rain.

Original prints of the film were tinted sepia.

== Accolades ==
It was nominated for five Academy Awards, winning in the category of Special Effects, for the earthquake and flood sequences. It became the first film to win an Academy Award for Best Special Effects, edging out other nominees, including The Wizard of Oz and Gone with the Wind. It was on a preliminary list of submissions from the studios for an Academy Award for Cinematography (Black-and-White) but was not nominated.

== 1955 adaptation ==
The Rains Came was remade in 1955 as The Rains of Ranchipur, with Richard Burton, Lana Turner and Fred MacMurray in the Power, Loy and Brent roles. The 1939 film uses the original novel's ending; the 1955 film provides different fates for Lord and Lady Esketh.
