= Maria Ouspenskaya =

Russian actress (1876–1949)

- Мария Успенская
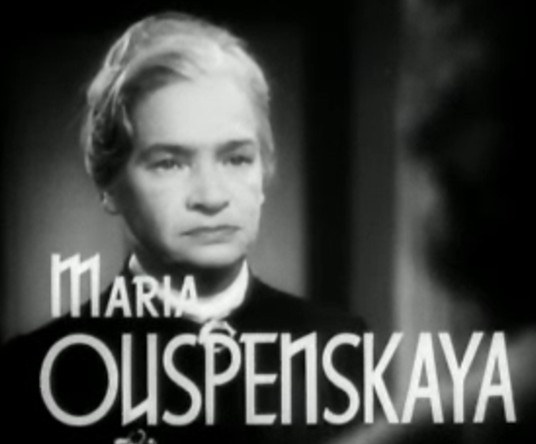
- Ouspenskaya in Waterloo Bridge (1940)
- Born: Maria Alekseyevna Ouspenskaya; July 29, 1876; Tula, Russia
- Died: December 3, 1949 (aged 73); Los Angeles, California, U.S.
- Resting place: Forest Lawn Memorial Park Cemetery
- Occupation: Actress
- Years active: 1915–1949

Maria Alekseyevna Ouspenskaya (Russian: Мария Алексеевна Успенская; 29 July 1876 – 3 December 1949) was a Russian actress and acting teacher. She achieved success as a stage actress as a young woman in Russia, and as an older woman in Hollywood films. She was twice nominated for the Academy Award for Best Supporting Actress for Dodsworth (1936) and Love Affair (1939). Ouspenskaya is the first Russian actress to be nominated for an Oscar.

== Life and career ==
Ouspenskaya was born in Tula, Russia. She studied singing in Warsaw and acting in Moscow. She was a founding member of the First Studio, a theatre studio of the Moscow Art Theatre. There she was trained by Konstantin Stanislavsky and his assistant Leopold Sulerzhitsky.

The Moscow Art Theatre traveled widely throughout Europe, and when it arrived in New York City in 1922, Ouspenskaya decided to stay there. She performed regularly on Broadway over the next decade. She taught acting to Lee Strasberg among others, at the American Laboratory Theatre, and in 1929, together with Richard Boleslawski, her colleague from the Moscow Art Theatre, she founded the School of Dramatic Art in New York City. One of Ouspenskaya's students at the school was an unknown teenaged Anne Baxter.

Although she had appeared in a few Russian silent films many years earlier, Ouspenskaya stayed away from Hollywood until her school's financial problems forced her to look for ways to repair her finances. According to ads from Popular Song magazine in the 1930s, around this time Ouspenskaya also opened the Maria Ouspenskaya School of Dance on Vine Street in Los Angeles. Her pupils included Marge Champion, the model for Disney's Snow White.

In spite of her marked Russian accent, she did find work in Hollywood, playing European characters of various national origins. Her first Hollywood role was in Dodsworth (1936), earning her a nomination for the Academy Award for Best Supporting Actress and making her the first Russian actress to be nominated for an Oscar. She received a second Academy Award nomination in the same category for her role in Love Affair (1939).

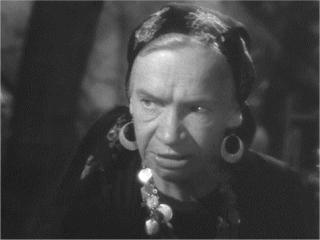
Ouspenskaya in 1941's The Wolf Man

She portrayed Maleva, an old Romani fortuneteller in the horror films The Wolf Man (1941) and Frankenstein Meets the Wolf Man (1943), both with Lon Chaney Jr. and Bela Lugosi. Her films depicting World War II were Frank Borzage's The Mortal Storm (1940), and Darryl F. Zanuck's The Man I Married (1940). Other films in which she appeared were: The Rains Came (1939), Waterloo Bridge (1940), Beyond Tomorrow (1940), Dance, Girl, Dance (1940), Dr. Ehrlich's Magic Bullet (1940), and Kings Row (1942). An award-winning biographical film about Ouspenskaya, She-Wolf in Hollywood: The Story of Maria Ouspenskaya (which used materials from Ouspenskaya's archives at UCLA), was released in 2024.

=== Death ===
Ouspenskaya died several days after suffering a stroke and receiving severe burns in a house fire, which was reportedly caused when she fell asleep while smoking a cigarette. She was buried in Glendale's Forest Lawn Memorial Park Cemetery.

== Filmography ==
Year	Title	Role
1936	Dodsworth	Baroness Von Obersdorf
1937	Conquest	Countess Pelagia Walewska
1939	Love Affair	Grandmother
1939	The Rains Came	Maharani
1939	Judge Hardy and Son	Mrs. Judith Volduzzi
1940	Dr. Ehrlich's Magic Bullet	Franziska Speyer
1940	Beyond Tomorrow	Madam Tanya
1940	Waterloo Bridge	Madame Olga Kirowa
1940	The Mortal Storm	Mrs. Breitner
1940	The Man I Married	Frau Gerhardt
1940	Dance, Girl, Dance	Madame Lydia Basilova
1941	The Wolf Man	Maleva
1941	The Shanghai Gesture	The Amah
1942	Kings Row	Madame von Eln
1942	The Mystery of Marie Roget	Mme. Cecile Roget
1943	Frankenstein Meets the Wolf Man	Maleva
1945	Tarzan and the Amazons	Amazon Queen
1946	I've Always Loved You	Madame Goronoff
1947	Wyoming	Maria
1949	A Kiss in the Dark	Mme. Karina

== See also ==
- List of Russian Academy Award winners and nominees
- List of actors with Academy Award nominations
