= Tin foil (disambiguation) =

Tin foil is a thin metal foil.

Tin foil or tinfoil may also refer to:

- a colloquial term for aluminium foil
- Barbonymus, a genus of fish which are sometimes called tinfoils
- Tinfoil, a novel by Mildred Cram
- Tinfoil, original title of Faithless (1932 film), an adaptation of Cram's novel
- "Tinfoil", an instrumental track on Living Things (Linkin Park album)

== See also ==
- Tin foil hat
