= Christmas in Connecticut (1992 film) =

Television film by Arnold Schwarzenegger

- Promotional poster
- Genre: Romantic comedy
- Based on: Christmas in Connecticut; 1945 film by: Aileen Hamilton; Adele Comandini; Lionel Houser
- Teleplay by: Janet Brownell
- Directed by: Arnold Schwarzenegger
- Starring: Dyan Cannon; Kris Kristofferson; Tony Curtis
- Music by: Charles Fox
- Country of origin: United States
- Original language: English

Production
- Executive producer: Stanley M. Brooks
- Producer: Cyrus Yavneh
- Cinematography: Chuck Colwell
- Editor: Michael Jablow
- Running time: 93 minutes
- Production companies: Turner Pictures; Once Upon A Time Productions

Original release
- Network: TNT
- Release: April 13, 1992

Christmas in Connecticut is a 1992 American Christmas romantic comedy television film directed by Arnold Schwarzenegger (his first and only film directing credit) and starring Dyan Cannon, Kris Kristofferson, and Tony Curtis. It is a remake of the 1945 film of the same name. The film premiered on TNT on April 13, 1992.

== Plot ==
Elizabeth is the star of a successful cooking show and the author of several cookbooks. Alexander, her manager, sees a heroic forest ranger named Jefferson on the television news, saying he has lost his cabin in a fire and wishes he could get a home-cooked Christmas dinner.

Alexander arranges for Elizabeth to do a special live show on Christmas, where she will cook a Christmas dinner for Jefferson. In reality, Elizabeth cannot cook and trying to keep Jefferson and the viewing public from finding out may be a little difficult, especially on a live show.

== Cast ==
- Dyan Cannon as Elizabeth Blane
- Kris Kristofferson as Jefferson Jones
- Tony Curtis as Alexander Yardley
- Richard Roundtree as Prescott
- Kelly Cinnante as Josie

Additional cast

- Gene Lythgow as Tyler
- Jimmy Workman as Kevin / Anthony
- Vivian Bonnell as Norah
- David Arnott as Crazed Director
- Toni Attell as Food Stylist
- Jenee Bandler as Kevin's Mother
- Bob Braun as Sam Simon
- Sonny Carl Davis as Captain Marsh
- Judy Forrester as Billy's Mother
- Wendle Josepher as A.D.
- Peter Kent as Police Officer #2
- Robert Machray as Potter
- Robert Noble as Kevin's Father
- Michael Potter as Police Officer #1
- George Putnam as News Anchor
- Arnold Schwarzenegger as man in chair in front of media truck (uncredited cameo)

== Reception ==
John Ferguson of Radio Times awarded the film two stars out of five, describing it as a lacklustre remake that failed to capture the charm of the original 1945 film.

Empire reviewed the film on release, calling it “competently made” but only “vaguely amusing”, adding that it “features enough fake snow to cover Alaska.”

Writing for Film Freak Central, Bill Chambers was strongly critical, calling the film “the sort of unqualified failure that finds something like thirty dozen ways to redefine ‘fatuous’,” and describing it as an unsuccessful remake of the 1945 Barbara Stanwyck film.

== See also ==
- List of Christmas films
- List of American films of 1992
