= Adele Comandini =

American screenwriter (1898–1987)

- Born: April 29, 1898; New York City, U.S.
- Died: July 22, 1987 (aged 89); Los Angeles, U.S.
- Occupation: Screenwriter

Adele Comandini (April 29, 1898 – July 22, 1987) was an American screenwriter who was nominated for the Academy Award for Best Story for Three Smart Girls (1936).

== Biography ==
Adele Comandini, daughter of Italian immigrants, was born in New York in 1898. She began her career as a screenwriter in the film industry in Hollywood in 1926 with the literary adaptation for the film Subway Sadie. Over time, she wrote the screenplays for more than 20 films and TV episodes.

At the Academy Awards in 1937, she was nominated for the Academy Award for best original story for Three Smart Girls (1936). Other well-known films she wrote screenplays for were Beyond Tomorrow (1940), Strange Illusion (1945), and Christmas in Connecticut (1945).

Comandini wrote the book Doctor Kate, Angel on Snowshoes (Clarke, Irwin & Company, Limited 1956), a biography of Kate Pelham Newcomb and edited Shirley Millard's book I Saw Them Die (Harcourt, Brace & Co. 1936).

Comandini died in 1987 in Los Angeles, California, aged 89.

== Partial filmography ==
- Subway Sadie (1926)
- The Joy Girl (1927)
- The Girl from Woolworth's (1929)
- The Love Racket (1929)
- Playing Around (1930)
- Hell Bound (1931)
- A Girl of the Limberlost (1934)
- Three Smart Girls (1936)
- The Road to Reno (1938)
- Beyond Tomorrow (1940)
- Her First Romance (1940)
- Always in My Heart (1942)
- Strange Illusion (1945)
- Christmas in Connecticut (1945)
- Danger Signal (1945)
- The Mating of Millie (1948)
- Flame of the Islands (1956)
- Christmas in Connecticut (1992)
