= Al Rockett =

American film producer

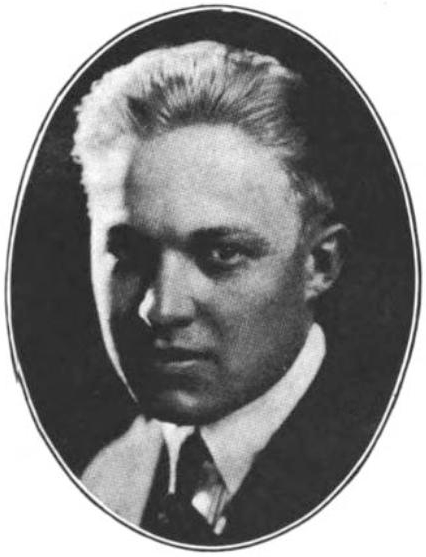
- Born: Albert Louis Rockett; September 24, 1889; Vincennes, Indiana, US
- Died: August 30, 1960 (aged 70); Beverly Hills, California, US
- Occupation: Film producer
- Spouse: Laura E. Rockett

Albert Louis Rockett (1889–1960) was an American movie producer. His 1924 film Abraham Lincoln, produced with his brother Ray Rockett, was a major production. It won the Photoplay Medal of Honor for 1924 from Photoplay Magazine, the most prestigious American film award of the time. He was born in Vincennes, Indiana, and played piano in a nickelodeon theater for five years. He worked for First National Pictures and Fox Film Corporation.

== Biography ==
Al Rockett was born in Vincennes, Indiana on September 24, 1889.

He died in Beverly Hills, California on August 30, 1960, after a long illness.

== Filmography ==
- Keeping Up with Lizzie (1921)
- Handle with Care (1922)
- Abraham Lincoln (1924)
- Subway Sadie (1926)
- The Girl from Coney Island (1926), also known as Just Another Blond
- Puppets (1926)
- The Patent Leather Kid (1927)
- An Affair of the Follies (1927)
- The Barker (1928)
- Cheer Up and Smile (1930)
- Wild Company (1930)
- High Society Blues (1930)
- The Princess and the Plumber (1930)
- Soup to Nuts, a Three Stooges film
- Their Mad Moment (1931)
- Business and Pleasure (1932)
- Shanghai Madness (1933)
- She Was a Lady (film) (1934)
- Hell in the Heavens (1934)
- Such Women Are Dangerous (1934)
- Lottery Lover (1935)
