= Slightly Dangerous =

1943 film by Wesley Ruggles

- Theatrical release poster
- Directed by: Wesley Ruggles
- Screenplay by: Charles Lederer; George Oppenheimer
- Story by: Aileen Hamilton
- Produced by: Pandro S. Berman
- Starring: Lana Turner; Robert Young; Walter Brennan; Dame May Whitty; Eugene Pallette; Alan Mowbray
- Cinematography: Harold Rosson
- Edited by: Frank E. Hull
- Music by: Bronislau Kaper
- Production company: Metro-Goldwyn-Mayer
- Distributed by: Loew's Inc.
- Release date: April 1, 1943
- Running time: 94 minutes
- Country: United States
- Language: English
- Budget: $918,000
- Box office: $2.5 million

Slightly Dangerous is a 1943 American screwball comedy film directed by Wesley Ruggles and starring Lana Turner, Robert Young, Walter Brennan, and Dame May Whitty. The film follows a bored young woman in a dead-end job who runs away to New York City and ends up impersonating the long-missing daughter of a millionaire. The screenplay was written by Charles Lederer and George Oppenheimer from a story by Aileen Hamilton.

Principal photography of Slightly Dangerous occurred between September and November 1942. Buster Keaton served as an uncredited joke writer on the film, and is also alleged to have directed a scene in the film in which Turner's character serves ice cream sundaes while blindfolded.

Released in April 1943, Slightly Dangerous received mixed reviews from critics, with some finding the screenplay lackluster, though Turner's lead performance received praise. (Note: Attributed to multiple sources.) The film was a box-office hit for Metro-Goldwyn-Mayer, grossing $2.5 million against a $918,000 budget. A Lux Radio Theatre radio play adaptation of the film aired on October 25, 1943, featuring Turner alongside Victor Mature and Gene Lockhart in the principal roles.

== Plot ==
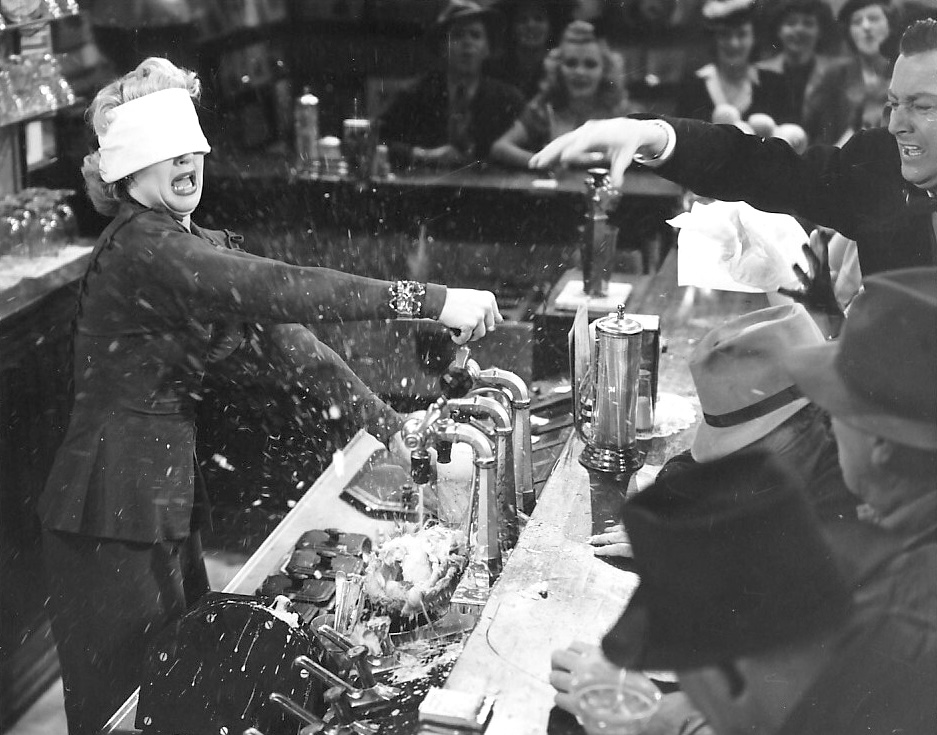
Turner in the film's opening scene

Peggy Evans, a bored and unhappy soda jerk in Hotchkiss Falls, New York, bets her co-worker, Mitzi that she can serve ice cream sundaes while blindfolded. She is reprimanded by the store's new general manager, Bob Stuart. An agitated Peggy leaves what appears to be a suicide note at her boardinghouse and disappears, leading locals to suspect Bob drove her to end her life. Unbeknownst to locals, Peggy has in fact fled to New York City, hoping to start anew.

Upon arriving in Manhattan, Peggy spends her life savings on a glamorous makeover, but while standing outside a newspaper office, is struck by a falling paint can and knocked unconscious. Durstin, a publisher at the paper, assumes Peggy is suffering amnesia and takes her in and runs her photo in the newspaper. After Durstin jokes that Peggy could be a kidnapped heiress, she visits the library and begins searching newspaper archives for missing persons cases, hoping to assume a new identity. She comes across the story of Carol Burden, a young girl who was kidnapped seventeen years prior and never discovered.

Meanwhile, Bob is terminated from his management position when the employees protest his treatment of Peggy. Bob spots Peggy's photo in the newspaper, and is determined to prove that she is in fact alive. Using information gleaned from the newspaper article on Carol's disappearance, Peggy drops clues to Durstin that suggest she is in fact the missing Carol. The two meet with Carol's father, Cornelius, who is suspicious but allows Peggy to move into his mansion to prove her claim. After Peggy meets Carol's childhood nanny, Baba, and manages to correctly answer several questions, Cornelius becomes convinced she is in fact his daughter.

Bob, having read about Cornelius's reunion with "Carol" in the newspaper, sneaks into the Burden mansion but is incapacitated by Jimmy, the family's bodyguard. Later, Bob tracks Peggy to a local concert and subsequently follows her to a cafe. She manages to elude him, but Bob succeeds in obtaining her fingerprint from a plant vase. Later, Bob sneaks into the Burdens' coming-out party for Carol, surprising Peggy on the dance floor. Bob presents Cornelius with a forged marriage certificate with Peggy's fingerprint, claiming the two are married and that she has long suffered amnesia.

Peggy refutes Bob's claims and convinces Cornelius to allow her to visit Hotchkiss Falls to make her own determination. Despite Bob's confrontations, Peggy persists in her impersonation and, en route, sabotages his car at a late-night diner. The two spend the night in a motel where Peggy presses Bob to join her in bed. As a result, Bob becomes convinced that she must indeed be Carol, as Peggy would never have trusted him. Bob phones Cornelius to obtain Peggy from the motel. Before Cornelius's arrival, Peggy finally admits her deception and is initially angry, but soon calms.

When Cornelius and Baba arrive, Bob attempts to stop Peggy from exposing her plot, unaware that Cornelius has received proof that Peggy is not his daughter. Despite knowing the truth, both Cornelius and Baba ask Peggy to go on impersonating Carol, having come to love her. Bob proposes to Peggy, while Cornelius looks forward to becoming his father-in-law.

== Cast ==
- Lana Turner as Peggy Evans / "Carol Burden"
- Robert Young as Bob Stuart
- Walter Brennan as Cornelius Burden
- Dame May Whitty as Baba
- Eugene Pallette as Durstin
- Alan Mowbray as an English gentleman
- Florence Bates as Mrs. Amanda Roanoke-Brooke
- Howard Freeman as Mr. Quill
- Millard Mitchell as Baldwin
- Ward Bond as Jimmy
- Pamela Blake as Mitzi
- Ray Collins as Snodgrass
- Gordon Richards as Garrett, the Butler
- Emory Parnell as Policeman
- Robert Blake as Boy on Porch (uncredited)

== Production ==
=== Development ===
Slightly Dangerous was adapted from a story by Aileen Hamilton by screenwriters Charles Lederer and George Oppenheimer. The lead role of Peggy Evans was specifically written for Turner, "tailored to give her a career-defining moment." The project initially had the working titles Nothing Ventured and Careless Cinderella.

=== Filming ===
Principal photography of Slightly Dangerous took place between September and November 1942. Turner was pregnant with her daughter, Cheryl, at the time of production, but did not disclose the pregnancy until after production had wrapped in December 1942.

Buster Keaton served as an uncredited joke writer on the film, and is also alleged to have directed the scene in which Turner's character serves ice cream sundaes while blindfolded.

== Release ==
Slight Dangerous premiered at the Capitol Theatre in New York City on April 1, 1943, followed by a Los Angeles release on April 22, 1943. The film opened in San Francisco on April 30, 1943.

The film had a regional release in Hamilton, Ontario, Canada on April 14, 1943. In the United Kingdom, it opened in Hammersmith, London on July 5, 1943.

=== Home media ===
Slightly Dangerous was released on DVD by the Warner Archive Collection on August 23, 2010.

== Reception ==
=== Box office ===
According to MGM records the film earned $1,579,000 in the US and Canada and $672,000 elsewhere, for a total of $2,465,000.

=== Critical response ===
==== Contemporary ====
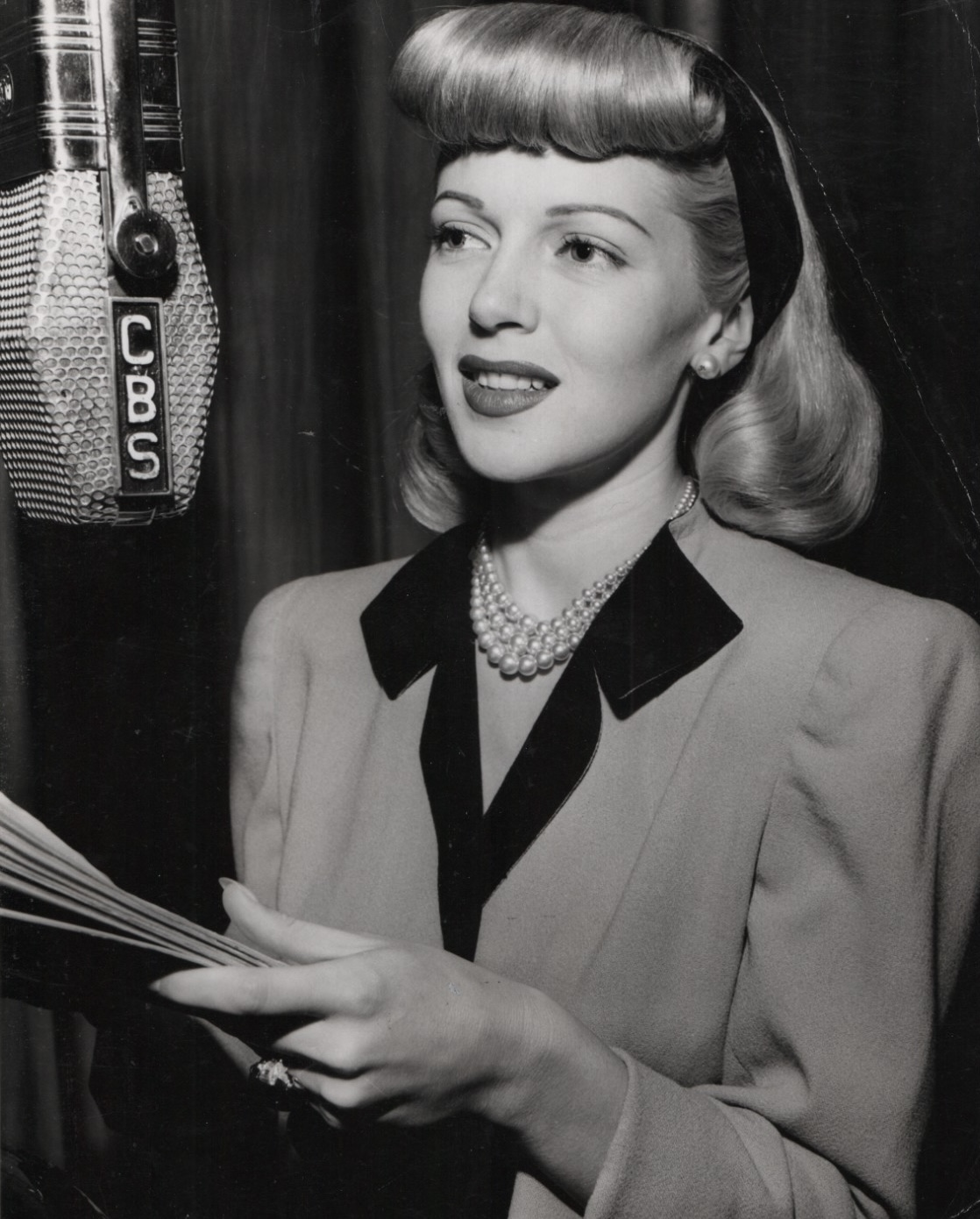
Turner (pictured performing in a Lux Radio Theatre adaptation of the film) received critical praise for her performance

Slightly Dangerous received mixed reviews from critics but favored well with audiences. Bosley Crowther of The New York Times panned the film, writing: "No less than four Metro writers must have racked their brains for all of five minutes to think up the rags-to-riches fable entitled Slightly Dangerous, now gracing the Capitol's screen. Indeed, there is cause for suspicion that they didn't even bother to think... Only Miss Turner, who wears the costumes and gets all the camera breaks, seems to have fun. Apparently she hasn't the foggiest notion of what a labored, vapid picture she is in."

Kate Cameron of the New York Daily News gave the film a mixed review, observing it as a "Cinderella tale with variations" that "develops into a bedroom farce that is totally lacking in good taste." Dwight Whitney of the San Francisco Chronicle was critical of the film's "glib" screenplay but praised Turner's comedic performance, writing: "As a movie, Slightly Dangerous is slightly vapid. As a vehicle for those Turner vibrations, we'd be crazy to complain."

The Buffalo Courier-Express gave the film a more favorable review, praising Turner and Young's performances, along with those of the supporting cast. The Springfield Evening Union also praised Turner's performance, as well as the film's "hilarious and satisfactory end," summarizing the picture as "deftly done." Moira Wallace of the San Francisco Examiner found Turner appealing in the film and described Dame May Whitty's performance as "wise and incisive," summarizing the feature as a "blithe comedy."

==== Retrospective ====
Leonard Maltin gave the film a two out of four star-rating, calling it a "trivial piece of fluff" with a "good cast."

In his 2019 book Too Funny for Words: A Contrarian History of American Screen Comedy from Silent Slapstick to Screwball, writer David Kalat praised Turner's performance as "pitch-perfect," as well as noting elements of screwball and slapstick comedy. Kalat describes the film as both an "Heiress on the Run film and a Cinderella story," noting it as an example of a "late-period high-point" for the genre of screwball comedy films, which had retained popularity in the United States during World War II.

Rob Patrick, writing for a 2025 presentation of the film by the Olympia Film Society, noted: "Wesley Ruggles managed to bring this unmoored curio to life with the help of Charles Lederer’s daffy screenplay and Lana Turner’s deft comedic timing. The outcome? A movie that is part onomatopoeia and part embrace. Lana makes a banana split while blindfolded and it’s more impressive than any Mission Impossible stunt. All these years later, Slightly Dangerous can be viewed as a long-forgotten trifle or a moving tale about identity and longing. But, then again, maybe it’s both."

== Radio adaptation ==
On October 25, 1943, Lux Radio Theatre aired a radio play adaptation of the film. In the radio play, Turner reprised her role of Peggy Evans. Robert Cummings was originally scheduled to portray the role of Bob Stuart, but was replaced by Victor Mature, while Gene Lockhart portrayed Cornelius Burden. The cast also included Verna Felton, Leo Cleary, Florence Halop, and Roland Drew.

== Sources ==
- Billips, Connie; Pierce, Arthur (1995). Lux Presents Hollywood: A Show-by-Show History of the Lux Radio Theatre and the Lux Video Theatre, 1934-1957. Jefferson, North Carolina: McFarland & Company. ISBN 978-0-786-48771-4.
- Curtis, James (2022). Buster Keaton: A Filmmaker's Life. New York City, New York: Alfred A. Knopf. ISBN 978-0-385-35421-9.
- Eames, John Douglas (1975). The MGM Story: The Complete History of Fifty Roaring Years. New York City, New York: Crown Publishing Group. ISBN 978-0-517-52389-6.
- Kalat, David (2019). Too Funny for Words: A Contrarian History of American Screen Comedy from Silent Slapstick to Screwball. Jefferson, North Carolina: McFarland & Company. ISBN 978-1-476-67856-6.
- Maltin, Leonard (2008). Leonard Maltin's 2009 Movie Guide. New York City, New York: Plume. ISBN 978-0-452-28978-9.
