= Allan Gilbert Cram =

American artist (1886–1947)

Allan Gilbert Cram (1886–1947) was an American painter.

== Early life ==
He was born in Washington D.C. on February 1, 1886, the elder brother of writer Mildred Cram. Cram received his fine art education in the East, studying under William Merritt Chase.

== Career ==
Cram later moved to San Diego, working mostly with western scenes. He was also an etcher and an illustrator for the U.S. government. Three of his large-scale paintings hang in the Santa Barbara County Courthouse.

== Works ==
- Chapin, Anna Alice (1917). Greenwich Village. New York City: Dodd, Mead & Co. "Illustrator : Allan Gilbert Cram"
- Mildred Cram. 1917 Old Seaport Towns of the South ; Drawings by Allan Gilbert Cram.
