= Wild Company =

1930 film

- Theatrical release poster
- Directed by: Leo McCarey
- Screenplay by: Bradley King
- Story by: Bradley King; John Stone
- Produced by: Al Rockett; William Fox
- Starring: Frank Albertson; Joyce Compton; Sharon Lynn; H. B. Warner; Richard Keene; Bela Lugosi
- Cinematography: L. William O'Connell
- Edited by: Clyde Carruth
- Music by: Cliff Friend; Jack Meskill; James V. Monaco
- Production company: Fox Film Corporation
- Distributed by: Fox Film Corporation
- Release date: July 5, 1930
- Running time: 71 minutes
- Country: United States
- Language: English

Wild Company is a 1930 American pre-Code drama film directed by Leo McCarey and written by Bradley King. The film stars Frank Albertson, Joyce Compton, Sharon Lynn, H. B. Warner, Richard Keene and Frances McCoy. The film was released on July 5, 1930, by Fox Film Corporation. Although Bela Lugosi had a relatively brief role in this film as a nightclub owner, his character's murder provides a pivotal plot point.

== Plot ==
Wastrel Larry Grayson constantly drains his wealthy father Henry Grayson's fortune to spend the money in a speakeasy where singer Sally Curtis entertains. Gangster Joe Hardy tells Sally to befriend Larry so that he can pin a murder rap on the young man. Larry winds up getting framed for the shooting murder of nightclub owner Felix Brown (Lugosi), and his wealthy father turns him over to the police. A criminal trial results in the young man receiving a suspended sentence and a lengthy lecture about how "partying and jazz music" can lead to the downfall of youths.

== Cast ==
- Frank Albertson as Larry Grayson, rich wastrel
- H. B. Warner as millionaire Henry Grayson
- Joyce Compton as Anita Grayson
- Claire McDowell as Mrs. Laura Grayson
- Sharon Lynn as Sally Curtis, nightclub singer
- Kenneth Thomson as Joe Hardy, gangster
- Richard Keene as Dick
- Frances McCoy as Cora Diltz
- Mildred Van Dorn as Natalie
- Bob Callahan as Eddie Graham
- Bela Lugosi as Felix Brown, nightclub owner
