= Anna Alice Chapin =

American author and playwright

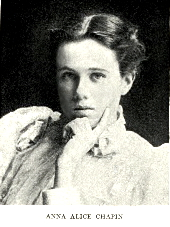
- New York Public Library Digital Gallery
- Born: December 16, 1880; New York City
- Died: February 26, 1920 (aged 39); New York City
- Occupations: Author and Playwright
- Spouse: Robert Peyton Carter

Anna Alice Chapin (December 16, 1880 – February 26, 1920) was an American author and playwright. She wrote novels, short stories, fairy tales and books on music, but is perhaps best remembered for her 1904 collaboration with Glen MacDonough on the child's book adaptation of the Babes in Toyland operetta.

== Early life ==
Anna Alice Chapin was born in New York City, the daughter of Dr. Frederick Windle Chapin and the former Anna J. Hoppin. Her father, a native of Providence, Rhode Island, attended Trinity College, Hartford and received his medical degree from New York University. Her mother was most likely a close relative of the architect Howard Hoppin (1854–1940), who designed several buildings in the Pomfret Street Historic District, including the Chapin home. Chapin received a private education and studied music under Harry Rowe Shelley.

== Career ==
Chapin published her first book, The Story of the Rhinegold, when she was just 17 years old. Her other works would include: Wonder Tales from Wagner (1898); Wotan, Siegfried, and Brunhilde (1898); Masters of Music (1901); The True Story of Humpty Dumpty: How He Was Rescued by Three Mortal Children in Make Believe Land, Illustrated & Decorated by Ethel Franklin Betts (1905); Discords (1905); The Heart of Music (1906); Königskinder (1911); The Nowadays Fairy Book (1911); The Street-Car Mystery (1911); The Spirit of the Sea (1912); The Topsy Turvy Fairy (1913); The Eagle's Mate (1914); The Every Day Fairy Book (1915); Mountain Madness (1917); and Jane (1920).

Chapin also wrote many short stories for magazines and newspaper syndication.

== The Deserters ==
Chapin wrote a play, produced in New York City in 1910, entitled The Deserters, written with her husband, Robert Peyton Carter, a stage actor who often worked with Maude Adams. In 1919 The Deserters was released as the film Sacred Silence, with William Russell and Agnes Ayres.

== Film ==
Several of Chapin's stories were adapted for film between 1914 and 1961. The Eagle's Mate was produced by Famous Players in 1914 with Mary Pickford and James Kirkwood, Sr. in the starring roles. In 1920 Mountain Madness came out with a cast led by Mignon Anderson, Harold Miller (1894-1972) and Ora Carew. The Girl of Gold written with Cleveland Moffett first appeared in the magazine Snappy Stories as a serial running from December, 1919 to March, 1920 and was produced as a film with Florence Vidor, Malcolm McGregor and Alan Roscoe in 1925. The libretto Babes in Toyland was first seen on film in 1934 as a vehicle for Laurel and Hardy and again in 1961 with Ray Bolger, Tommy Sands and Annette Funicello.

== Bibliography ==
- Chapin, Anna Alice (1897), The story of the Rhinegold (Der Ring des Nibelungen) told for young people, New York: Harper & Brothers Publishers, pubdate 1900

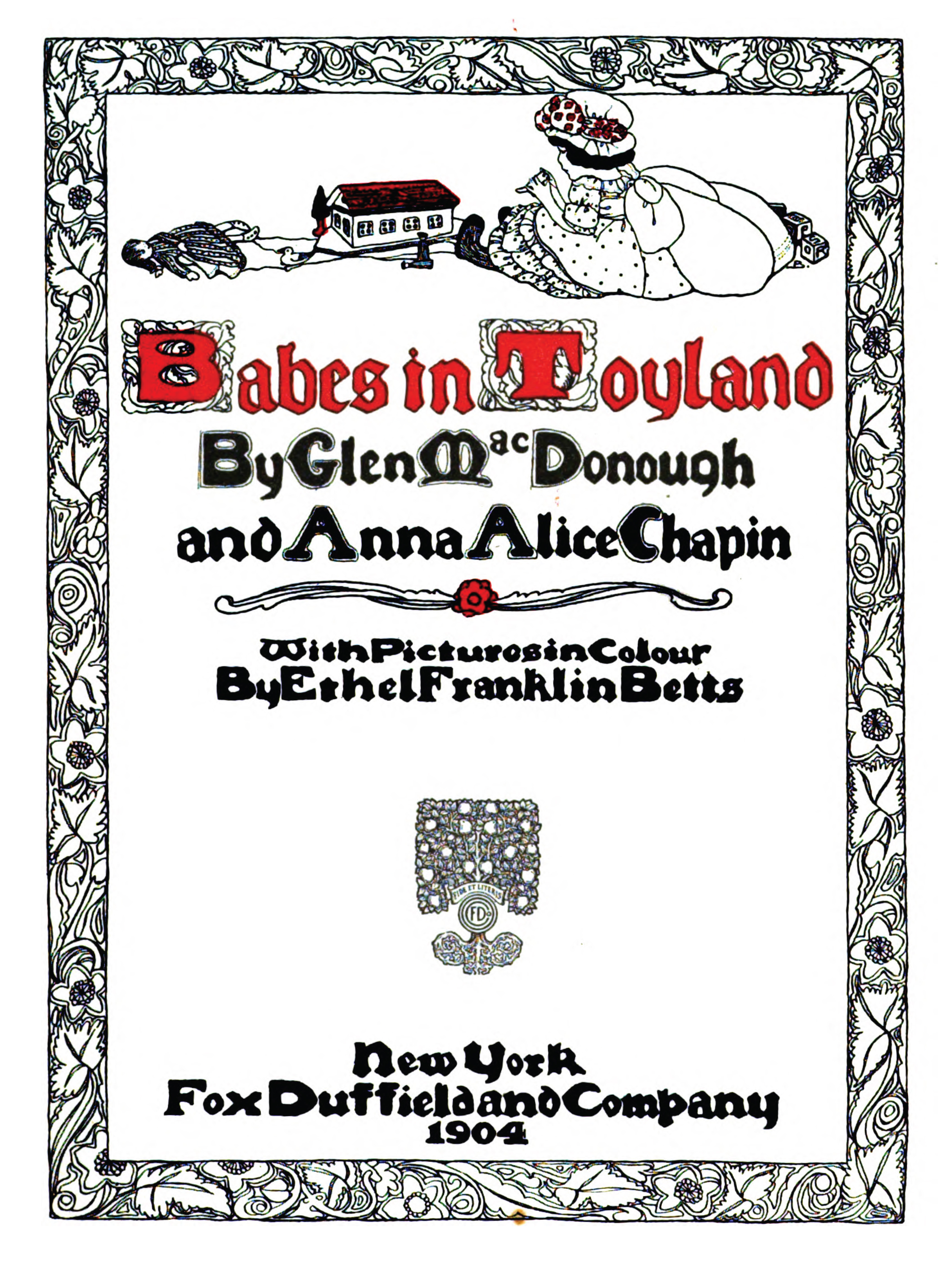
Babes in Toyland, 1904

- MacDonough, Glen; Chapin, Anna Alice; Betts, Ethel Franklin (1904). Babes in Toyland (octavo). Fox, Duffield and Company.
- Chapin, Anna Alice (1907). The heart of music: the story of the violin. New York: Dodd, Mead & Co. OCLC 1045975184.
- Carter, Robert Peyton; Chapin, Anna Alice (1910). "The Deserters,".
- Chapin, Anna Alice (1915). The Everyday Fairy Book. NYC: Dodd, Mead. "Illustrated by Jessie Willcox Smith"
- Chapin, Anna Alice (1917). Greenwich Village. New York City: Dodd, Mead & Co. "Illustrator : Allan Gilbert Cram"

== Personal life ==
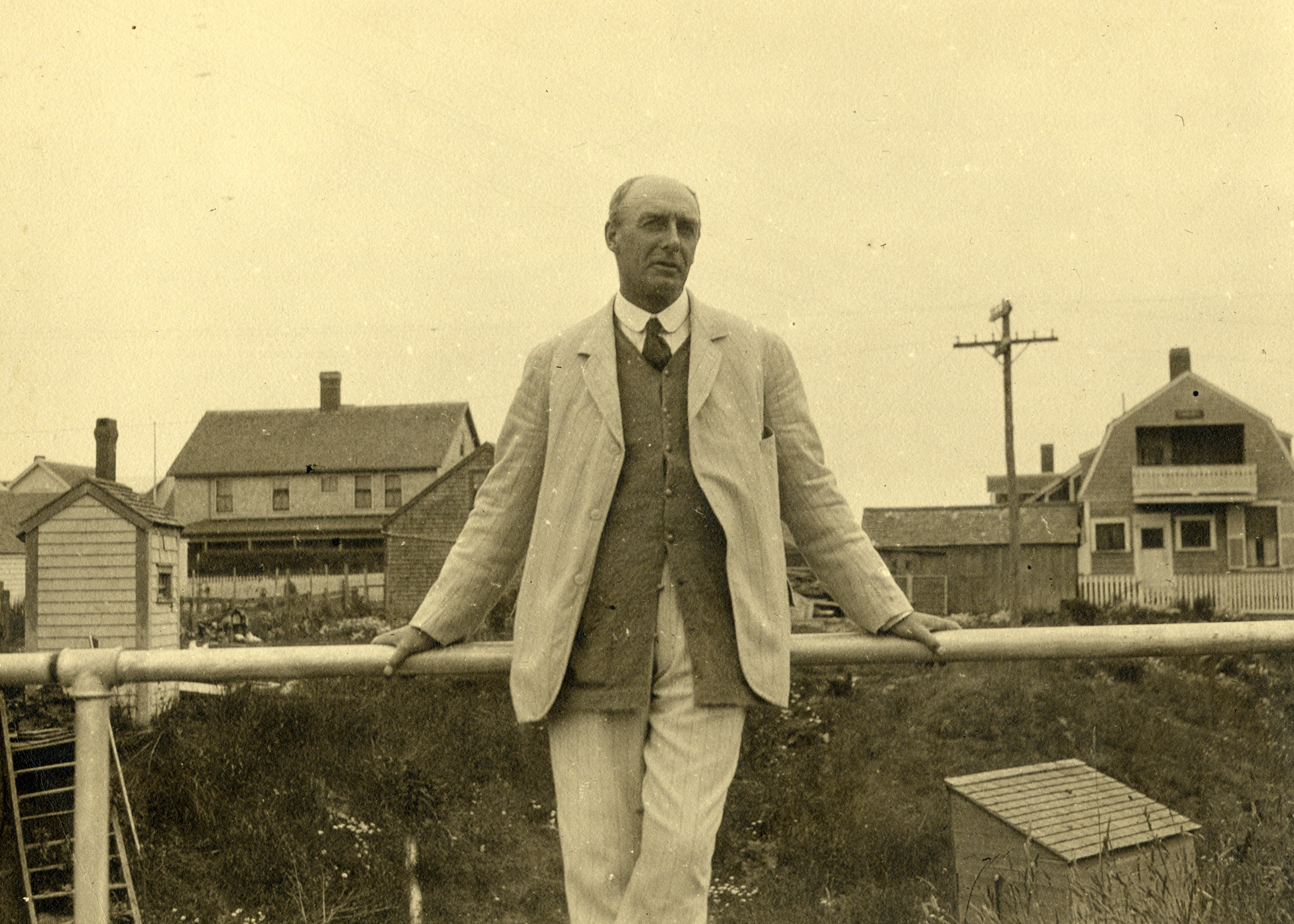
Robert Peyton Carter

Chapin married Robert Peyton Carter, a stage actor who often worked with Maude Adams, in 1906. Chapin, aged 39, died after a short illness at her residence on West Thirteenth Street, New York City.

She was preceded in death, on June 8, 1918, in Monrovia, California, by her husband, Robert Peyton Carter, who had appeared on stage as recently as March 1918 supporting Maude Adams in A Kiss for Cinderella. and often together in Peter Pan
