= This Modern Age =

1931 film

- Film poster
- Directed by: Nick Grinde
- Written by: Story: Mildred Cram; Dialogue: Sylvia Thalberg; Frank Butler
- Produced by: Gordon Raphael
- Starring: Joan Crawford; Pauline Frederick; Neil Hamilton
- Cinematography: Charles Rosher
- Edited by: William LeVanway
- Production company: Metro Goldwyn Mayer
- Distributed by: Metro-Goldwyn-Mayer
- Release date: August 29, 1931
- Running time: 68 minutes/ 1 hour 8 minutes
- Country: United States
- Language: English
- Budget: $361,000
- Box office: $891,000

This Modern Age is a 1931 American pre-Code Metro-Goldwyn-Mayer feature film directed by Nick Grinde and starring Joan Crawford, Neil Hamilton, Pauline Frederick and Albert Conti.

== Plot ==
Socialite Valentine "Val" Winters is a child of divorced parents and has not seen her sophisticate mother, Diane, in years. Indeed, Diane had all but forgotten about Val, as the courts awarded sole custody of Val to her father, who had recently died. Val travels to Paris for a reunion where her mother is living as the mistress of André de Graignon.

While in Paris, Valentine meets fun-loving and alcoholic Tony, who is in Diane's social circle. When Valentine and Tony are involved in a car wreck, they are rescued from his overturned car by football-playing Harvardian Bob Blake Jr.. Bob and Valentine fall in love, and, when he invites his parents to meet her, everything goes wrong as they do not approve of Tony and his boisterous friends or of Diane's living arrangement with Andre.

Later, Bob overhears a conversation between Diane and André de Graignon during which André complains about his life being on hold for Val and that he is kicking Diane out of his house. Bob tries to rush their marriage plans so that he can take her away from her mother's deception without Val discovering the truth, but when she resists, he tells her the truth about her mother and implores her to forget about her and her friends and abscond with him. Insulted, Val says the allegations about the house not being Diane's are a lie and that she loves her mother over anything, and then she spurns Bob.

Val goes to her mother, and when Diane becomes alarmed that Val may have put her relationship with the wealthy Bob in jeopardy, Diane tells her the truth. Val is a bit shocked, but is determined to stay with her mother no matter the consequences. The two move into a much smaller apartment, and Tony comes by because he is still smitten with Val. However, unbeknownst to Val, Diane recontacted André and told him that she would leave Val to travel Europe with him. Diane gives the news of her impending departure to her daughter, who is heartbroken at her mother's betrayal.

Diane leaves and visits Bob for a final time. She tells him that she went to his parents to beg for mercy for Val's sake. They reject Diane's entreaties. Having done this, Diane's reputation in Paris is ruined, which is why she took the opportunity to go away with André. Suddenly, Bob views his parents attitude of condemning Val for her mother's sins as antiquated and shameful, and the two embrace. Bob goes to Val and they are reunited to continue their relationship.

== Cast ==
- Joan Crawford as Valentine Winters
- Pauline Frederick as Diane Winters
- Neil Hamilton as Bob Blake
- Monroe Owsley as Tony Girard
- Hobart Bosworth as Mr. Robert Blake Sr.
- Emma Dunn as Mrs. Margaret Blake
- Albert Conti as André de Graignon
- Adrienne D'Ambricourt as Marie (the housekeeper)
- Marcelle Corday as Alyce (the maid)

== Production ==
The film was based upon the story Girls Together by Mildred Cram, and follows the story of a socialite girl deciding between the social sins of her mother and a comfortable life in the arms of a rich suitor.

This Modern Age is notable for Crawford playing a blonde. According to a biography, she "wore her hair that color because the actress who was originally to play the part of the mother, Marjorie Rambeau, was a blonde. When Rambeau became ill, the part was recast with a brunette actress, Pauline Frederick, whom Joan greatly admired. Joan's scenes had already been shot, and the difference in hair color was not reason enough to reshoot them. Besides, there was no reason why a brunette mother couldn't have a blonde-haired daughter - or maybe she was just into peroxide."

== Reception ==
=== Critical reception ===
Mordaunt Hall in The New York Times commented, "The film glides along merrily most of the time, but now and again it has its off moments...Nicholas Grinde, [the director] has done splendid work by his comedy, but his serious interludes might have been handled more effectively." The New York Times also said of Crawford, "she gives a better portrayal here than she has in any of her previous talking pictures...she succeeds in being quite convincing in cheery and serious moments."

=== Box office ===
According to MGM records the film earned $708,000 in the US and Canada and $183,000 elsewhere resulting in a profit of $218,000.
