= Christmas in Connecticut =

1945 film by Peter Godfrey

- Theatrical release poster
- Directed by: Peter Godfrey
- Screenplay by: Lionel Houser; Adele Comandini
- Story by: Aileen Hamilton
- Produced by: William Jacobs
- Starring: Barbara Stanwyck; Dennis Morgan; Sydney Greenstreet; Reginald Gardiner; S. Z. Sakall; Robert Shayne
- Cinematography: Carl E. Guthrie
- Edited by: Frank Magee
- Music by: Frederick Hollander
- Production company: Warner Bros. Pictures
- Distributed by: Warner Bros. Pictures
- Release dates: July 27, 1945 (New York City); August 11, 1945 (United States)
- Running time: 101 minutes
- Country: United States
- Language: English
- Budget: $864,000
- Box office: $3–4.132 million

Christmas in Connecticut is a 1945 American Christmas romantic comedy film directed by Peter Godfrey and starring Barbara Stanwyck, Dennis Morgan, and Sydney Greenstreet, with Reginald Gardiner, S. Z. Sakall, and Robert Shayne in supporting roles. It follows about an unmarried city magazine writer who pretends to be a farm wife and mother for the sake of her popular lifestyle column, and falls in love with a returning war hero while hosting him for a Christmas holiday.

== Plot ==
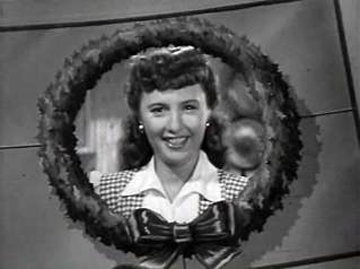
Barbara Stanwyck as Elizabeth Lane in Christmas in Connecticut

Elizabeth Lane is a single New Yorker, employed as a lifestyle writer, renowned for her recipes and homemaking tips. Her articles about her fictitious Connecticut farm, husband, and baby are admired by readers across the country. Her publisher, Alexander Yardley, is unaware of the charade and insists that Elizabeth host a Christmas dinner for returning war hero Jefferson Jones, who read all of her recipes while in the hospital and is so fond of them that his nurse/fiancée Mary Lee wrote a letter to the publisher. Facing a career-ending scandal, not only for herself but for her editor, Dudley Beecham, Lane is forced to comply. In desperation, Elizabeth agrees to marry her friend John Sloan, who has a farm in Connecticut. She also enlists the help of her chef friend and "honorary uncle" Felix Bassenak, who has been providing her with the recipes for her articles.

At Sloan's farm on Christmas Eve, Elizabeth meets Norah, the housekeeper, as well as a neighbor's baby whom they pretend is their baby. Elizabeth and John plan to be married immediately by Judge Crothers, but the ceremony is interrupted when Jefferson arrives early. Elizabeth falls in love at first sight.

The judge returns on Christmas morning, but the ceremony is postponed when a different neighbor's baby is presented instead of the one from the day before. The household is alarmed when Felix claims that the baby has swallowed his watch. After the judge leaves, Uncle Felix admits to Elizabeth that he had lied about the watch to stop the wedding. While the household attends a dance that evening, the baby's real mother arrives to pick up her baby. Alexander, who had earlier invited himself over for Christmas dinner, witnesses her leaving with the child and assumes someone is kidnapping the baby. Elizabeth and Jefferson spend the night in jail, charged with stealing a neighbor's horse and sleigh they had accidentally taken for a joyride, and return to the farm early the next morning. Alexander chastises Elizabeth for being out all night and accuses her of neglecting her child. Elizabeth finally confesses all. Furious, Alexander fires her.

Mary Lee arrives unexpectedly. Dejected, Elizabeth retires to pack her things and leave the farm. Felix learns that Mary Lee has already married someone else and has come to break the engagement. He entices Alexander into the kitchen with the smell of cooking kidneys. He fabricates a story about a competing magazine's attempts to hire Elizabeth, and Alexander decides to hire her back with an increase in salary. Felix tells Jefferson that he is free to pursue Elizabeth. Elizabeth's packing is interrupted, first by Alexander, and then by Jefferson. After teasing her that he is a cad who woos married women, Jefferson reveals the truth. The couple kiss and plan to marry.

== Cast ==
- Barbara Stanwyck as Elizabeth Lane
- Dennis Morgan as Jefferson Jones
- Sydney Greenstreet as Alexander Yardley
- Reginald Gardiner as John Sloan
- S. Z. Sakall as Felix Bassenak
- Robert Shayne as Dudley Beecham
- Una O'Connor as Norah
- Frank Jenks as Sinkewicz
- Joyce Compton as Mary Lee
- Dick Elliott as Judge Crothers

== Production ==
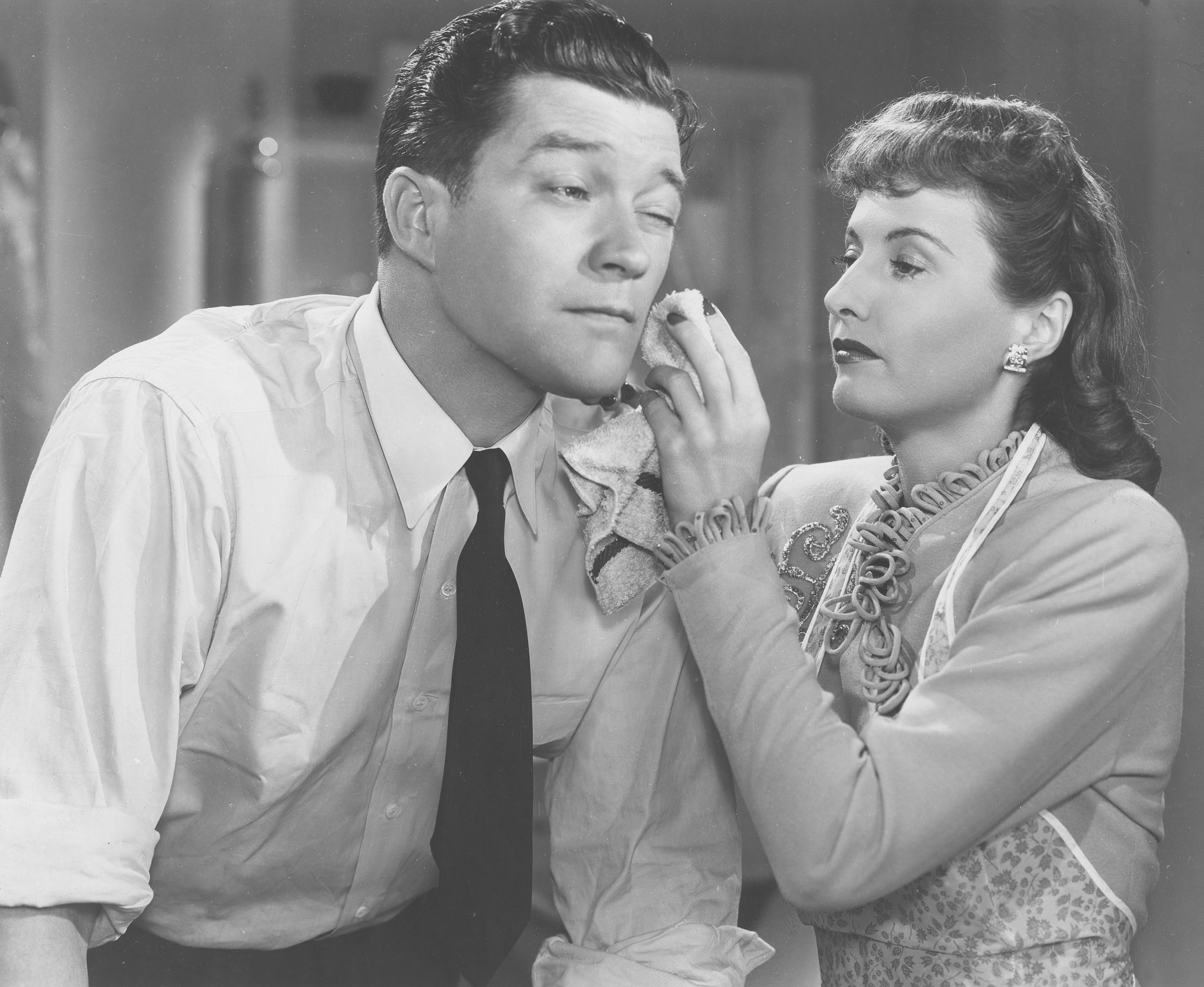
Morgan and Stanwyck in a scene from the film

The idea for Christmas in Connecticut was based on an original story by Aileen Hamilton, with Bette Davis initially cast in the female lead for the film. However, she was replaced by Stanwyck in April 1944. Dennis Morgan was cast in the male lead, having been a contract player for Warner Bros. By 1945, Screenland magazine reported he had received "more fan mail than any one on the lot". Stanwyck's suitor, played in the film by Reginald Gardiner, was originally to have been played by John Alexander. Incidentally, Gardiner kept his left hand in his pocket virtually in every scene due to an earlier injury when he fell headfirst down an iron fire escape. Sydney Greenstreet and Peter Lorre were intended to reunite, having appeared together in Casablanca (1942) and The Conspirators (1944). Edith Head designed Barbara Stanwyck's gowns for the film and Milo Anderson designed additional gowns.

== Reception ==
The film earned $3,273,000 domestically and $859,000 in overseas markets.

William Brogdon of Variety wrote: "Story is lightweight but well-polished situations, direction and playing keep it in high gear most of the way for nifty returns. Some of the gags cut rather close to the Haysian frown but since they spring from nature are good for solid roars." A review in The Hollywood Reporter called the film "an audience winner from way back in the balcony"; it noted "Stanwyck has herself a time romping through the part of the girl. S.Z. Sakall has himself a field day as the chef ... Dennis Morgan is a relief and attractive as the only straight man in the show." Edwin Schallert of the Los Angeles Times felt the performances and "the direction by Peter Godfrey transform [the film] into a very lively entertainment, with large stress on sophistication."

Harrison's Reports wrote: "With a little less footage and a bit more care in the treatment, this story might have been an hilarious farce. As it stands, it is fairly amusing." The New York Times felt Barbara Stanwyck was "not happily cast in this picture" and felt "Peter Godfrey, the director, has a good deal to learn about the art of telling a boudoir joke in the parlor and getting away with it." A review in Time magazine wrote: "Christmas In Connecticut, for all its rattle and redolence of mothballs, is thoroughly moth-eaten. The caprice involves Barbara Stanwyck, Dennis Morgan, Sydney Greenstreet, S. Z. Sakall and a couple of babies who, though too young to know any better, are going to have quite a time living it down."

In 1946, high school principal Dean Lobaugh alleged that the film "is quite unsound and dangerous to the morals of the American people." Lobaugh critiqued the film's depiction of deception by all characters to achieve their ends, and he takes issue with "a tale in which charming people lie and cheat and get rewarded, and honest people are made to appear stupid". In a retrospective review, critic Emanuel Levy noted that the film "obviously propagated conservative ideology, sending women to the kitchen to dutifully play their roles as housewives and mothers after tasting some emancipation during the War years."

On the review aggregator website Rotten Tomatoes, 89% of 18 critics' reviews are positive, with an average rating of 7.2/10. Metacritic, which uses a weighted average, assigned the film a score of 64 out of 100, based on 7 critics, indicating "generally favorable" reviews.

== Radio adaptation ==
Christmas in Connecticut was presented on Stars in the Air on March 20, 1952. The 30-minute adaptation starred Gordon MacRae and Phyllis Thaxter.

== Television adaptation ==
The Lux Video Theatre presented a one-hour version on December 13, 1956, starring Mona Freeman, Ed Kemmer, and Roland Winters.

== Remake ==
A remake of Christmas in Connecticut was released in April 1992, starring Dyan Cannon as Elizabeth, Kris Kristofferson as Jefferson Jones, and Tony Curtis as Mr. Yardley. The television film, which first aired on TNT, was directed by Arnold Schwarzenegger, who also had a cameo appearance. In this remake, Elizabeth Blane is the hostess of her own cooking show. When her manager, Alexander Yardley, introduces her to Jefferson Jones – a forest ranger who lost his cabin in a fire – he asks her to make Jones Christmas dinner live on her show. As in the original, Elizabeth is not as talented as she seems.

== Musical adaptation ==
A stage adaptation of the film premiered at the Goodspeed Opera House in 2022. The book of the musical was written by Patrick Pacheko and Erik Forrest Jackson, with lyrics by Amanda Yesnowitz, and music by Jason Howland.

== See also ==
- List of American films of 1945
- List of Christmas films
