= The Eagle's Mate =

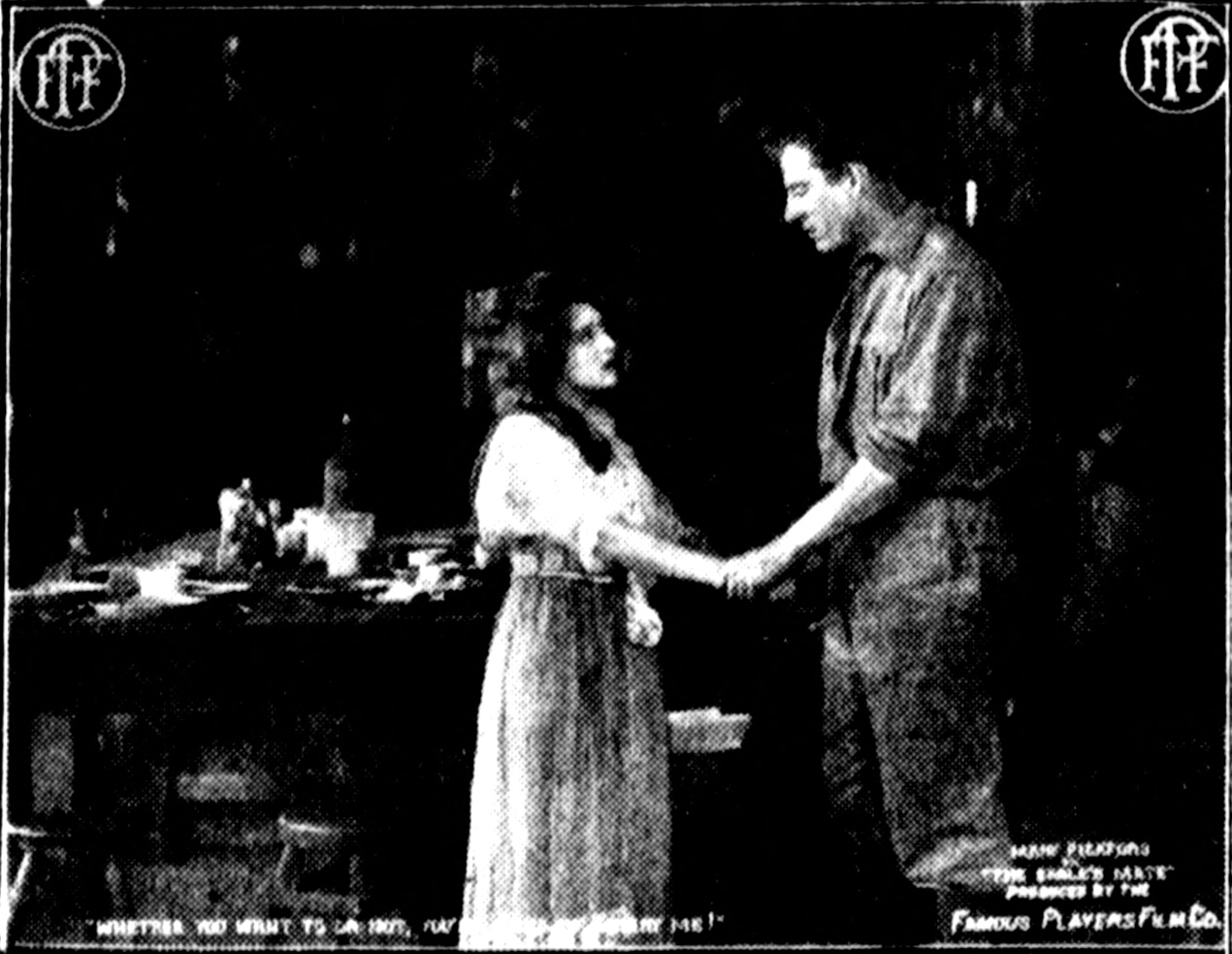
- Scene from the film.
- Directed by: James Kirkwood
- Written by: Eve Unsell (scenario)
- Based on: The Eagle's Mate by Anna Alice Chapin
- Produced by: Adolph Zukor
- Starring: Mary Pickford
- Cinematography: Emmett A. Williams
- Distributed by: Paramount Pictures
- Release date: July 5, 1914
- Running time: 5 reels (5,165 feet)
- Country: United States
- Language: Silent (English intertitles)

The Eagle's Mate is a 1914 American silent drama film produced by the Famous Players film company and released through Paramount Pictures. The film starred Mary Pickford and was her first film working with the actor/director James Kirkwood. The film is based on a novel, The Eagle's Mate, by Anna Alice Chapin. It is a surviving film.

== Cast ==
- Mary Pickford as Anemone Breckenridge
- James Kirkwood as Lancer Morne
- Ida Waterman as Sally Breckenridge
- Robert Broderick as Abner Morne

Unbilled:

- Harry C. Browne as Fisher Morne
- Helen Gilmore as Hagar Morne
- Jack Pickford as A young clansman
- R. J. Henry as Luke Ellsworth
- Russell Bassett as Rev. Hotchkiss
- J. Albert Hall
- Robert Milasch as Mountaineer

== Reception ==
Like many American films of the time, The Eagle's Mate was subject to cuts by city and state film censorship boards. For example, for the 1918 re-release of the film the Chicago Board of Censors required cuts, in Reel 2, of all scenes where men fall after being shot, Reel 3, man tearing opponent's mouth in fight, and, Reel 5, Fisher shooting her husband.
