= Subway Sadie =

1926 film by Alfred Santell

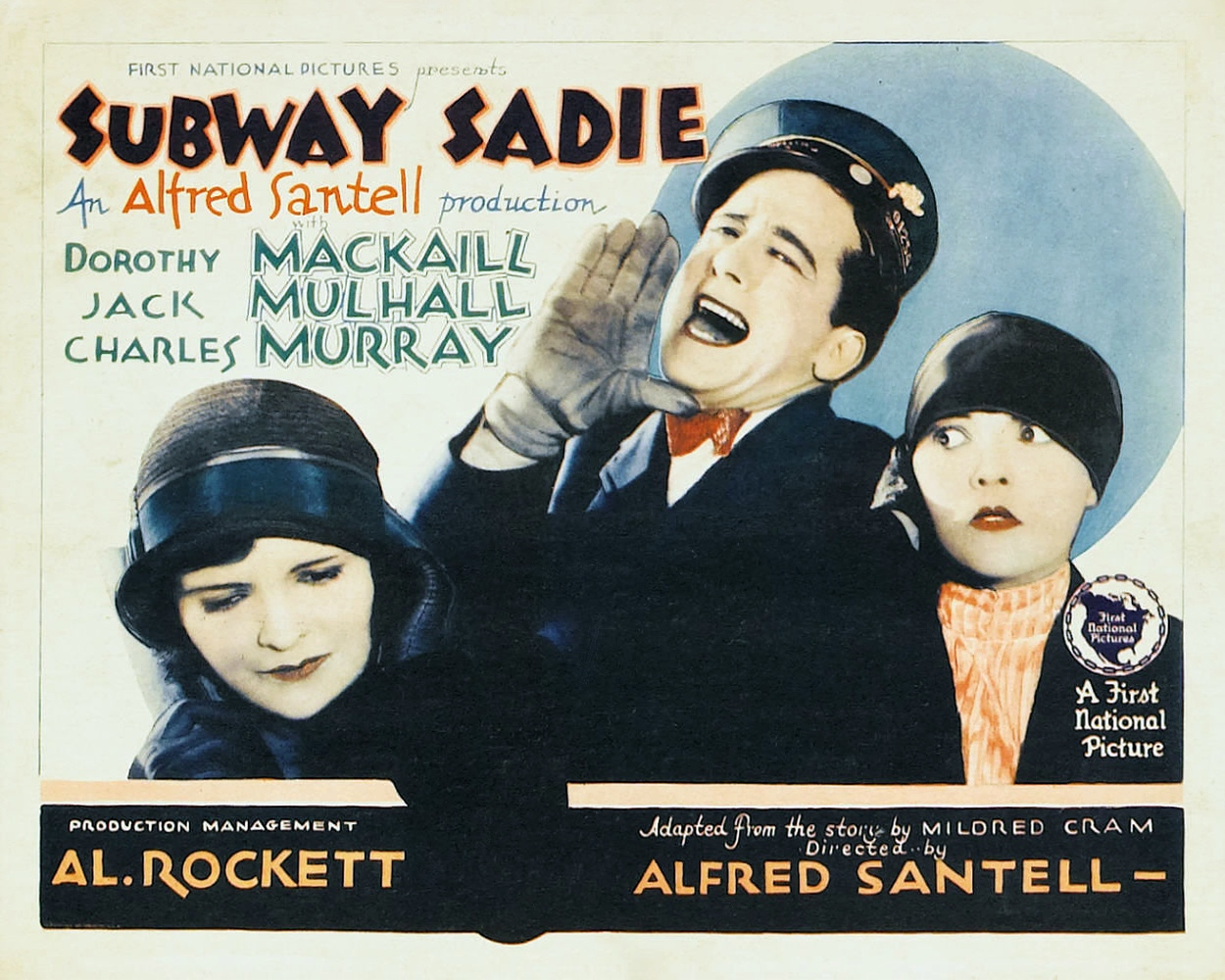
- Lobby card
- Directed by: Alfred Santell
- Screenplay by: Adele Comandini; Paul Schofield
- Based on: Sadie of the Desert by Mildred Cram
- Produced by: Al Rockett
- Starring: Dorothy Mackaill; Jack Mulhall
- Cinematography: Arthur Edeson
- Edited by: Hugh Bennett
- Production company: Al Rockett Productions
- Distributed by: First National Pictures
- Release date: September 12, 1926
- Running time: 70 minutes
- Country: United States
- Language: Silent with intertitles

Subway Sadie is a 1926 American silent comedy-drama film directed by Alfred Santell. Adapted from Mildred Cram's 1925 short story "Sadie of the Desert", the film focuses on a relationship between New York salesgirl Sadie Hermann (Dorothy Mackaill) and subway guard Herb McCarthy (Jack Mulhall), who meet on the subway and become engaged. However, after Sadie receives a promotion, she must choose between her new job and marrying Herb. The cast also includes Charles Murray, Peggy Shaw, Gaston Glass, and Bernard Randall.

The film began production in May 1926. Arthur Edeson served as cinematographer, shooting around Central Park in areas like casinos and nightclubs. Distributed by First National Pictures, the film premiered in New York on September 12, 1926. Many publications wrote positively of the film, praising its acting and Santell's direction. Today, it remains unknown whether a print of Subway Sadie has survived.

== Plot ==
Salesgirl Sadie Hermann, employed in a New York City fur store, has always dreamed of traveling to Paris. While riding the subway to work one morning, she meets Irish subway guard Herb McCarthy, and the two strike up a conversation before Herb eventually arranges to have them meet at Cleopatra's Needle that Sunday.

Herb and Sadie are soon engaged to be married, but as Sadie has been promoted from saleslady to firm buyer she must cancel the wedding date to sail to Paris for the job, saddening Herb. Sadie prepares to leave, but then receives a message from Herb, which informs her that he is in the hospital as the result of an accident. Sadie chooses to visit him, and she decides to forgo her new job and marry Herb instead, Herb revealing that his father is the president of the subway company.

== Production ==
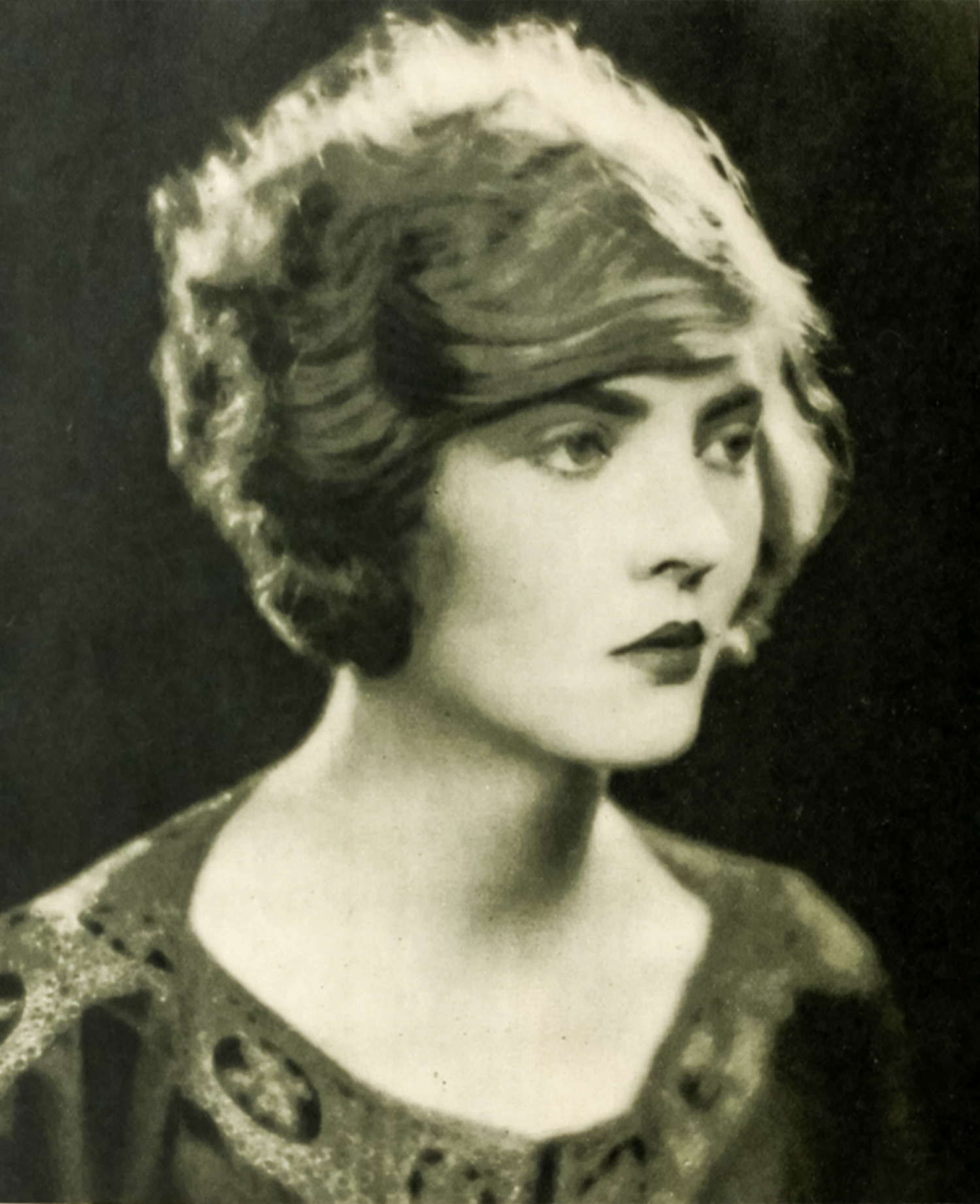
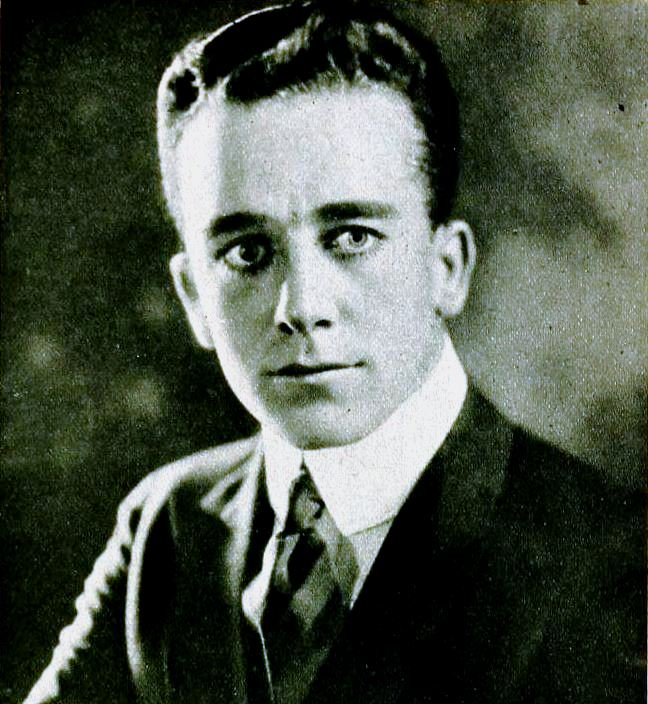
Dorothy Mackaill and Jack Mulhall, who both had lead roles in Subway Sadie

Alfred Santell directed Subway Sadie, from a screenplay written by Adele Comandini and Paul Schofield. The pair adapted a short story by Mildred Cram entitled "Sadie of the Desert", which had first been published in an October 1925 issue of The Red Book Magazine.

On May 3, 1926, the film entered production. Santell and Al Rockett, the film's producer and production manager, selected the actors to appear in the film. Jack Mulhall was cast in the lead as Herb McCarthy. Although he had ridden on a subway many times, he did not take notice of the guards, so as preparation for playing the character he rode on a subway for "practically an entire day" to observe them. Mulhall said of Santell:

That man's a great director. He can make people feel perfectly natural. He's got what Chaplin did when he directed A Woman of Paris—he and Lewis Milestone and Mal St. Clair all have that same touch, they all belong to the new school of directors, it seems to me. They're not so busy thinking about technique that they have actors turning into marionettes.

Chosen to play female lead Sadie Hermann, Dorothy Mackaill opined that the film would appeal to "every girl in America". She believed that "there is not a situation in this picture which could not happen to any girl. That is one of the things I like about it. There is nothing in it that could not be true." The rest of the cast includes Charles Murray as a driver, Peggy Shaw as Ethel, Gaston Glass as Fred Perry, and Bernard Randall portraying Brown.

Arthur Edeson served as the cinematographer for Subway Sadie, shooting the silent film in black-and-white. Filming took place at several locations in Central Park, including Cleopatra's Needle and a local casino inn, which marked the first time the location had been filmed. A nightclub scene was also shot in New York. Hugh Bennett served as the film's editor, while Al Rockett Productions produced. Rockett told Motion Picture News in June 1926 that the film had been completed. First National Pictures filed a copyright for the film on August 18, 1926. The finished product was seven reels long, and comprised 6,727 feet (2,050 m) of film, running for about 70 minutes.

== Release and reception ==
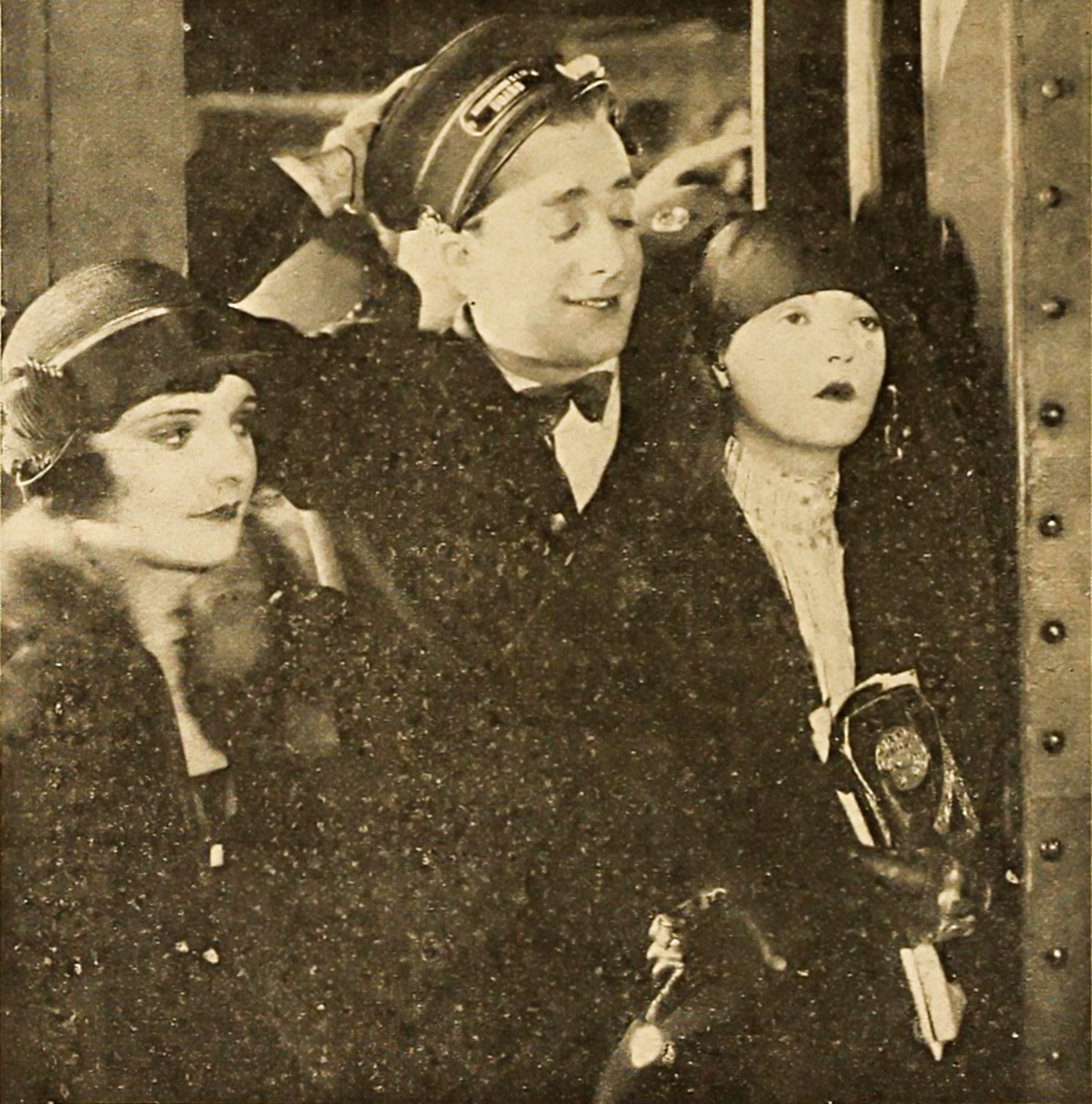
A scene from the film, featuring Mulhall and Mackaill. Their successful pairing in Subway Sadie led to them appearing in several other films.

First National Pictures handled distribution for Subway Sadie, with the film premiering in New York on September 12, 1926. It received positive reviews; a journalist for The New York Times enjoyed the film, calling it "an amusing photoplay". Although the review branded the ending unsurprising, they described it as "nevertheless pleasing". The Evening Independent praised the film, lauding it as "one of the cleverest and most interesting pictures that has been here this season".

A review from Photoplay applauded Mackaill's performance and described the film as "a true and human story". The review in the Motion Picture Herald assessed it as "a nice little feature, nothing big, but will go over on bargain nights", with praise directed to Mulhall's performance. A Berkeley Daily Gazette review wrote of the film by saying "sheer brilliance rarely has been equalled" and praised the story, direction, and acting.

The Morning Telegraph's review said that Subway Sadie would "delight the majority of straphangers" and that "it is what the boys call excellent box-office". The New York American review was similarly positive, describing it as "a light but charming comedy". In the New York World, the review described the film as "a consistently decent affair" which featured good direction by Santell. A review in The Daily Mirror wrote positively of Mackaill's performance and complimented Santell's directing abilities, while Reading Eagle praised the performances of the leads, calling them "a stellar combination". Not all reviews were positive; a negative review came from The Educational Screen, whose reviewer found the film to be "pretty trite stuff".

In June 1927, a Southeast Missourian journalist wrote that the film had since become "very successful". The pairing of Mulhall and Mackaill was described as "such a perfect team" that plans to have them star in many further films occurred. Films they appeared in after Subway Sadie include Smile, Brother, Smile (1927), Ladies' Night in a Turkish Bath (1928), Lady Be Good (1928), and Children of the Ritz (1929). The 1933 drama Curtain at Eight marked the final film they appeared in together.

Screenings of Subway Sadie occurred as late as January 12, 1928. As of November 2007, it is unclear whether a print of the film exists; it has likely become a lost film. A poster of the film can be seen at the New York Transit Museum.
