= Faithless (1932 film) =

1932 film

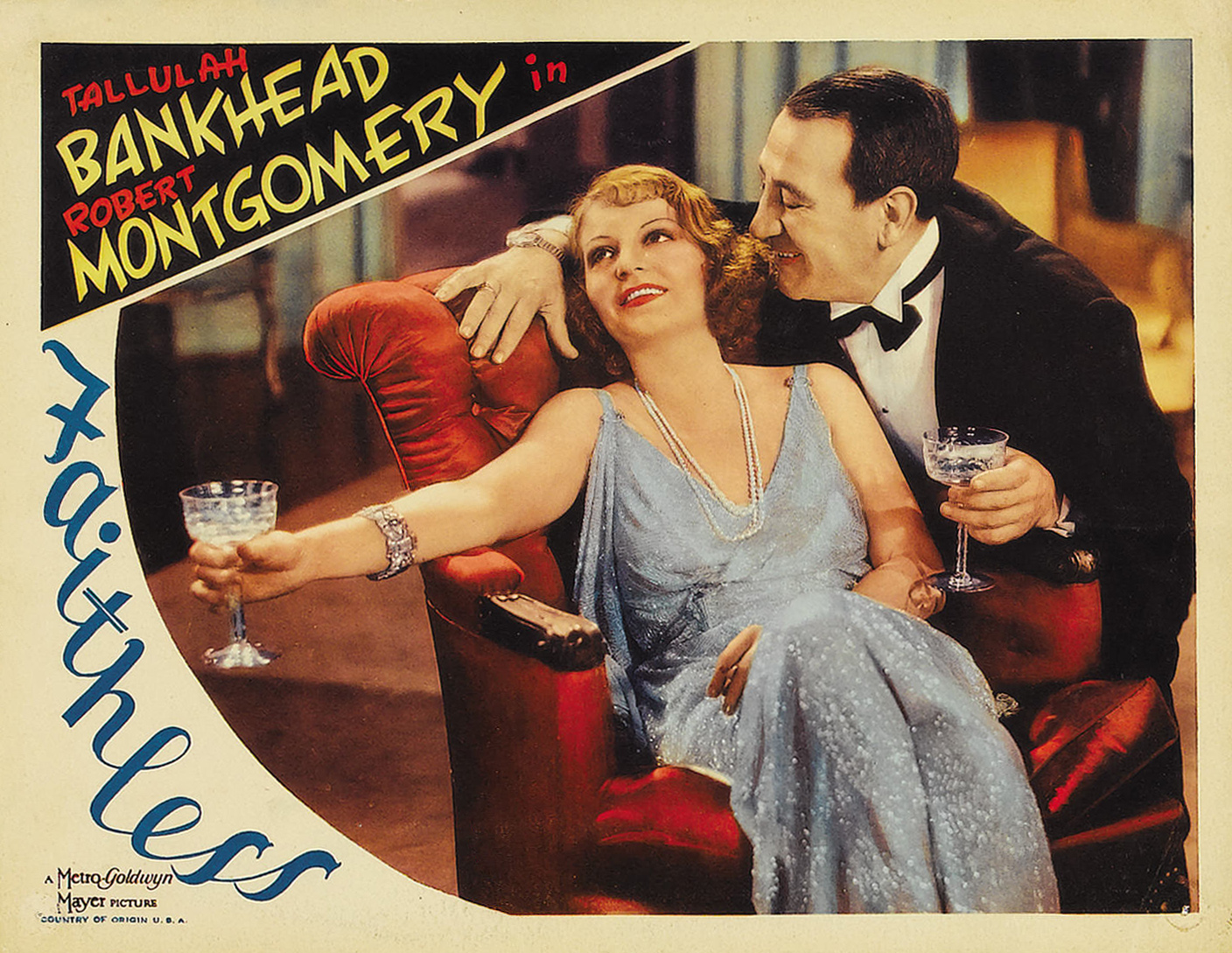
- Color-enhanced lobby card, 1932
- Directed by: Harry Beaumont
- Written by: Carey Wilson
- Based on: Tinfoil by Mildred Cram
- Starring: Tallulah Bankhead; Robert Montgomery
- Cinematography: Oliver T. Marsh
- Edited by: Hugh Wynn
- Production company: Metro-Goldwyn-Mayer
- Distributed by: Loew's Inc.
- Release date: October 15, 1932
- Running time: 74-77 minutes
- Country: United States
- Language: English

Faithless is a 1932 American pre-Code romantic drama film about a spoiled socialite who loses her money during the Great Depression. The film stars Tallulah Bankhead and Robert Montgomery and is based on Mildred Cram's novel Tinfoil, which also provided the film's working title.

== Plot ==
Spoiled New York socialite Carol Morgan, romping through the Depression with her lavish lifestyle, breaks her engagement with advertising executive Bill Wade over her refusal to live on his comparatively modest salary rather than on her own wealth. They temporarily resolve their differences, but Carol refuses Bill's offer for an expedited wedding at city hall, and again they are at odds. Bill leaves Carol at her opulent home.

Later, when Carol's lawyer and financial manager inform her that she has lost everything, she tentatively reconciles with Bill, only to learn that he has lost his job that same day. He informs her that he is moving to Chicago to find another position there. They argue about living on Bill's meager income and cancel their wedding hopes once again. Disgusted by Carol's pampered personality and lifestyle, Bill's younger brother Tony tells her that she is a "useless good-for-nothing". Tony denounces her as a courtesan to Bill and predicts that she will become destitute. Bill responds that Carol is a good person who does not yet realize it.

Carol is reduced to borrowing money from wealthy social climbers, but soon the prestige formerly associated with her name dissipates. She becomes the mistress of Peter Blainey, whose wife had tried to evict her as a disgraced house guest. Bill eventually traces Carol to an elegant apartment for which Blainey is footing the bill and finds her with Blainey there. Feeling disgusted with herself after Bill departs, she ends her relationship with Blainey and leaves the apartment, telling him that if she cannot win Bill's forgiveness, she hopes to at least "square it with myself".

On her own, virtually penniless and unable to find a job, Carol becomes desperate for food and temporarily avoids eviction from her shabby one-room apartment by selling her shoes to the landlady. She is near collapse from hunger and exhaustion when Bill finds her and asks her once more to marry him, telling her that the past is done and that the slate is clean between them. Bill is now a truck driver, but his company folds, leaving him jobless again. However, they finally marry. As newlyweds, they continue to struggle through more hard times until Bill is offered another driving job as a strikebreaker. However, union thugs threaten him and ram his truck with another vehicle as he tries to begin work on his first day.

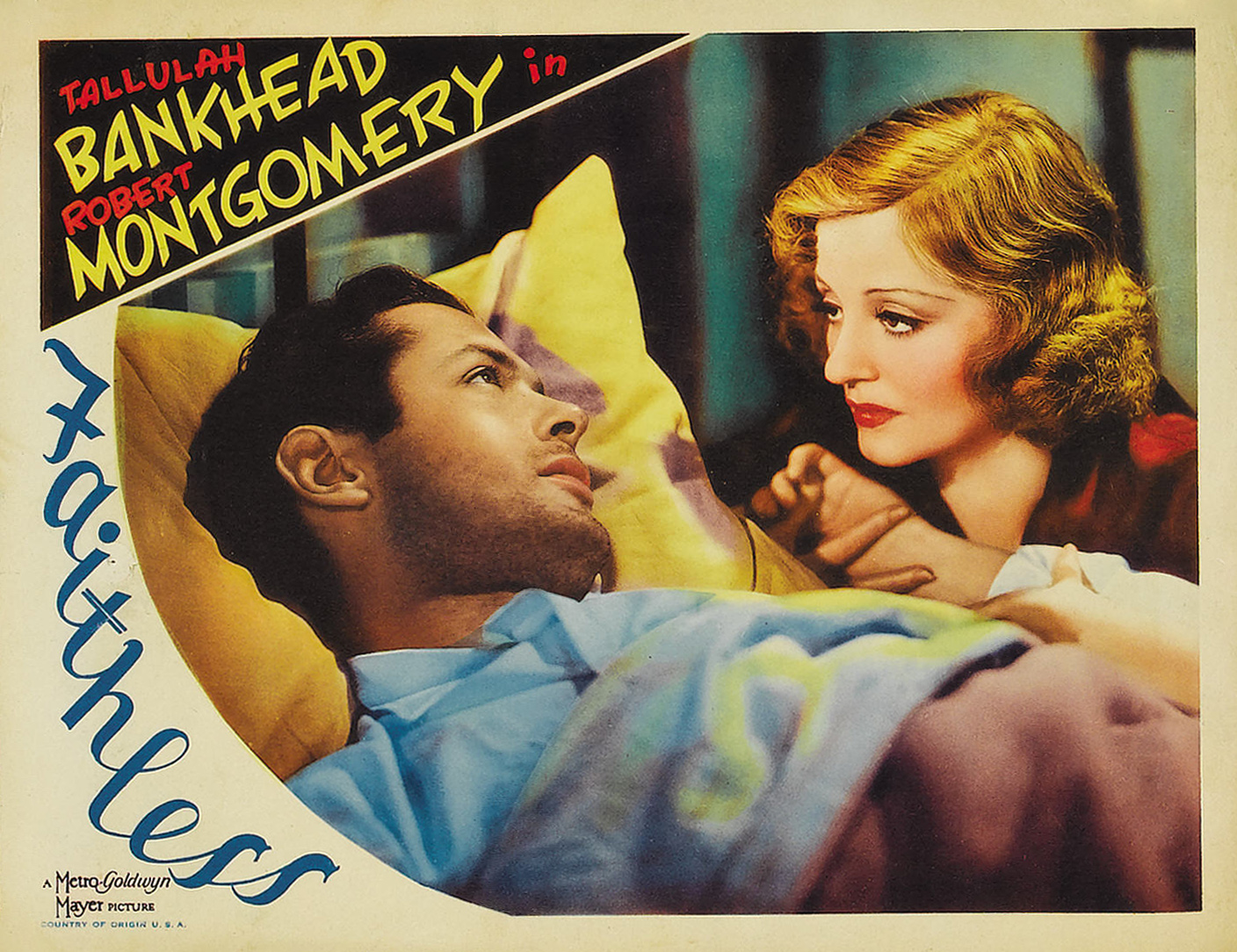
Color-enhanced lobby card depicting scene in which Carol comforts Bill after he is injured.

With Bill severely injured in the wreck, Carol is forced into prostitution to pay his medical bills and their living expenses as she nurses him back to health. She accidentally solicits Tony on the street as he arrives in town. A policeman arrests her but takes pity and helps her secure a job as a waitress by bullying the owner of a small diner.

Bill is just on his feet again when Tony arrives for a visit with news that his prediction for Carol had been fulfilled. He is shocked to learn that Carol has become his sister-in-law. Carol enters and tells Bill that she had intended to confess and leave as soon as he was well again, adding that she would do it all again given their dire circumstances. After a moment of sadness, Bill embraces Carol and thanks her for saving his life, wiping the slate clean again.

== Cast ==
- Tallulah Bankhead, as Carol Morgan
- Robert Montgomery, as William "Bill" Wade
- Hugh Herbert, as Peter M. Blainey
- Maurice Murphy, as Anthony "Tony" Wade
- Louise Closser Hale, as First Landlady
- Anna Appel, as Mrs Mandel, Second Landlady
- Lawrence Grant, as Mr Ledyard
- Henry Kolker, as Mr Carter
- Jack Baxley, as Candy Store Proprietor (uncredited)
- Jay Eaton, as Chez Louise Manager (uncredited)
- Maude Eburne, in a bit part (uncredited)
- Sterling Holloway, as Photographer (uncredited)
- Tenen Holtz, as Diner Proprietor (uncredited)
- Geneva Mitchell, as Party Guest (uncredited)

== Production ==
Tallulah Bankhead was under contract with Paramount Pictures, but after making five unsuccessful films for the studio, Paramount loaned her to Metro-Goldwyn-Mayer to star in Faithless. Hoping to refine Bankhead's appearance to increase the film's potential at the box office, MGM dressed Bankhead in glamorous gowns by Adrian and gave her a new stylish Greta Garbo-type hairdo for the film's early scenes.

== Reception ==
In a contemporary review for The New York Times, critic Mordaunt Hall called Faithless a "lumbering species of drama" and wrote:

Whatever may be said against the lengthy and tangled story of 'Faithless,' this film at least has the distinction of capable portrayals by Tallulah Bankhead and Robert Montgomery. Yet, as well as they do here in the various phases of the narrative, it is obvious that both would be better suited to a smart comedy than to this lumbering species of drama.

In a negative review, Variety wrote:

It wasn't enough that Paramount didn't do right by Tallulah Bankhead; they had to lend her to Metro for a picture pointing out the sorrows of the depression and what it did to one wealthy and glamorous heroine. What it did was plenty. ... The whole [plot] invites spoofing. They pile on the suffering so thick any but the most naive theatergoers are going to revolt and scoff, instead of reacting in tears.

The Film Daily also panned the film, writing:

A pretty bad story again handicaps Tallulah Bankhead, and it doesn't help Robert Montgomery either. Plot is a rehash of the obvious sort. ... Motivation is weak, especially that of the hero, who forgives the girl's waywardness repeatedly, and the succession of trials and tribulations for the most part are unwholesome and depressing. The action rambles considerably. Every time the happy ending seems around the corner, some new disappointment turns up and turns on the gloom again.

A review in the Motion Picture Herald praised both the story and cast, particularly Bankhead's performance, concluding that the film's "theme makes it possible for Tallulah Bankhead to turn in an outstanding performance, more vivid than her previous screen appearances."
