= Aileen Hamilton =

English actress, dancer, costume designer and screenwriter (1902–1993)

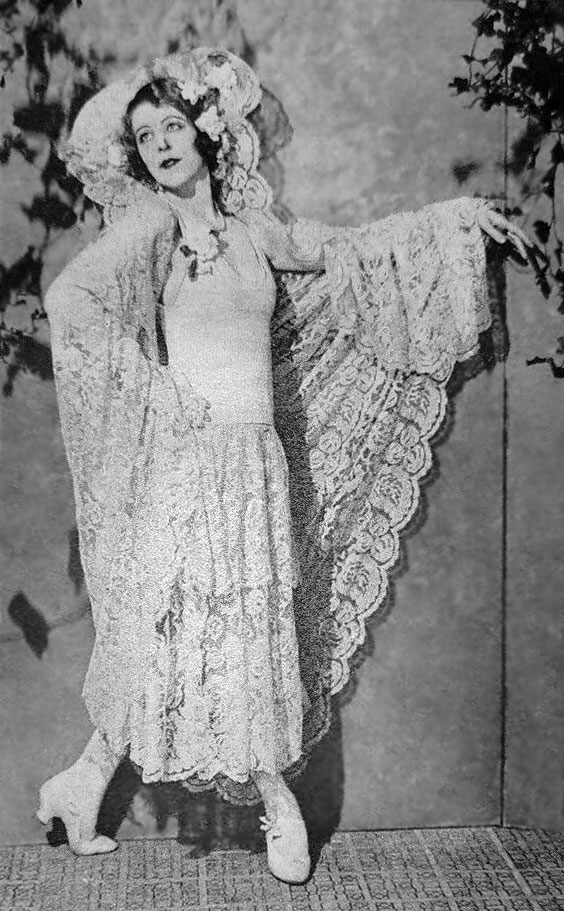
- Hamilton in 1924.
- Born: Aileen McLellan Hunter; January 4, 1902; Bristol, England, G.B.
- Died: June 6, 1993 (aged 91); California, U.S.
- Occupations: Screenwriter; dancer; actress; singer; costume designer
- Years active: 1914–1957
- Known for: Christmas in Connecticut; Slightly Dangerous; Little Nellie Kelly; The Adventures of Robin Hood
- Relatives: Ian McLellan Hunter (brother); Tim Hunter (nephew)

Aileen McLellan Hunter (January 4, 1902 – June 6, 1993), known professionally as Aileen Hamilton, was an English and American screenwriter, dancer, actress, singer and costume designer, credited for writing the story behind the film Christmas in Connecticut (1945). Starting out as a professional dancer as a child in England, Hunter went on to appear on London's West End. After relocating to the US, she starred in a series of Broadway revues throughout the 1920s. She was described in 1927 as "one of Ziegfeld's protégés."

== Early life and family ==
Aileen Hunter was born on January 4, 1902 in Bristol, England to Elsie Emily Hunter (née Stevenson) and William McLellan Hunter, a steamship captain, all hailing from Bristol's Clifton area. Aileen was christened on February 2, 1902 at Kingsdown St. Matthew's Church in Cotham, Bristol. She had a younger sister, Alison (born 1905 in Bristol), a child actress and later costume designer, and younger brother Ian McLellan Hunter (born August 8, 1915 in London), a well known English screenwriter of over 20 films and series and credited for Roman Holiday, the story and screenplay which he fronted for blacklisted writer Dalton Trumbo.

Aileen's parents William and Elsie Hunter were married in 1900 at Clifton Holy Trinity Church and in 1901 lived at 28 Ravenswood Rd, Clifton, Bristol, where Aileen was born the following year. In 1909 at age 7, Aileen reportedly did a tour of China, Japan, India and Arabia, and was greatly inspired by the rhythmic motions of the native dancers of India. She and her sister Alison were listed in the 1911 census among six girl boarders aged 5 to 11( Alison being the youngest) at a private school in nearby Cotham, Bristol, run by joint principals Ethel May and Constance May Gittins. In her autobiography the prima ballerina Phyllis Bedells, also from Bristol, lists Hunter as a pupil. By 1912 at age 10, she was performing in a charity dancing program at Bristol's Victoria Rooms as one of 40 or so pupils of the Misses Edythe and Muriel Parnall of Clifton. Two years later Aileen and 150 other children performed there again under the same tutelage, where it was reported, "Aileen Hunter delighted the audience with Valse Bluette, a charming example of toe-dancing, of which this clever child, who is only twelve years old, is a skilful exponent." The latter was her first reported public solo performance. Five months later she was one of 45 artists dancing and performing twice a night in a revue at the Derby Grand Theatre in aid of the War Relief Fund where as a principal artist, it was reported she "delights her audience with her graceful tip-toe dancing."

Details in his 1922 passport application indicate her father, born in Bristol, had become a naturalized US citizen on June 11, 1896 with an address in the US since 1890 at Sea Bright, NJ. It also stated that from 1896 to 1919, he lived in London, though his permanent domicile remained as 320 W. 83rd St, NYC. During this time as steamship captain, he lived largely on board various ships, maintaining residences both sides of the Atlantic between voyages and returning periodically to his family in Bristol.

== Professional dance career ==
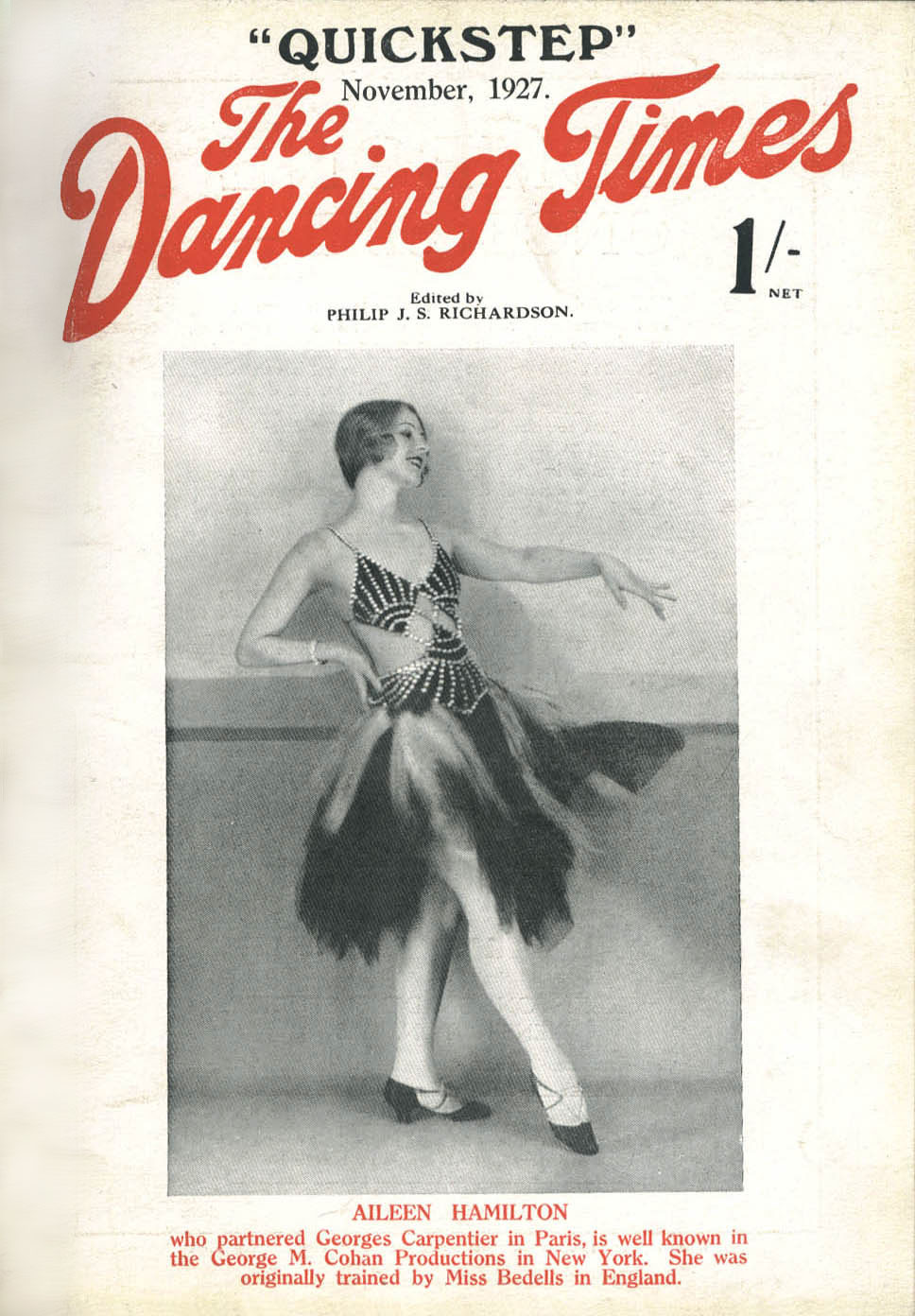
Magazine cover, 1917.

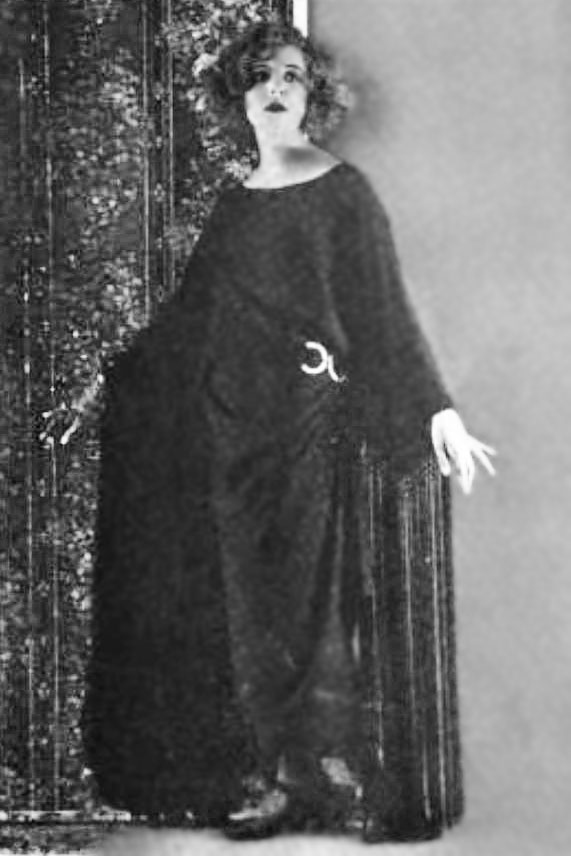
Hamilton pictured in "Good Morning Dearie", 1922.

In 1917 at age 15 and still a minor, she was performing professionally at London's Alhambra Theatre, still using the name Aileen Hunter, having already danced alongside the Danish-British ballerina Adeline Genée and Serge Morosov, a dancer with the Russian ballet and a leading teacher in London. At that time, Aileen's father was a prisoner of war in Germany, and after his release found employment in New York.

The following year, Aileen went to work in post-war France at the Casino de Paris. The revue was Pa-Ri-Ki-Ri, with headliner Maurice Chevalier and a cast of 400. According to an addendum to the ship's manifest in 1919, when Aileen's siblings and mother emigrated aboard the S.S. Lapland from Southampton to New York to join their father (October 22, 1919 – November 3, 1919), both she and her mother had previously visited the US in November 1912 for unspecified work. The 1919 manifest lists the occupation of both girls, aged 17 and 14 respectively, as "domestic" and their father as living at 141 Broadway, New York. The 1920 census lists the family reunited in a Manhattan apartment at 324 W. 83rd Street, with Aileen's occupation as waged "Actor" in the "stage" industry, age 18. Between August 16 and November 1920 after a run-in Atlantic City, Aileen performed in The Lady of the Lamp (111 performances, August 17 – November 20, 1920) as one of the Seven Little Princesses, at the Republic Theatre under her new stage name Aileen Hamilton.

In 1922, her father required a passport to travel on September 23 aboard the S.S. Vestris to Buenos Aires to inspect steamers on behalf of his employer, Lloyd Royal Belge Steamship Co S.A. of 10 Pearl St, New York. While including most of his family his passport photo omitted her; by this time she was a working adult living in New York under her stage name Aileen Hamilton, having performed in The Lady of the Lamp and just finished as one of Sixteen Sunshine Girls in Good Morning Dearie, a musical comedy at Broadway's Globe Theatre (347 performances: November 1, 1921, to August 26, 1922). She was also already rehearsing as a "specialty dancer" or "loose toe artist", according to Variety, in a musical number called "The Flirting Salesmen" with Joseph Niemeyer in George M. Cohan's Little Nellie Kelly, another musical comedy at the Liberty Theatre, also on Broadway (November 13, 1922 to July 7, 1923, 276 performances). In November 1924, she became a member of the Actors' Equity Association. Later that year, Hamilton played Señorita, a Spanish dancer, in the revue The Grab Bag back at the Globe Theatre (October 6, 1924, to March 14, 1925), which subsequently went on tour to venues including Werba's Brooklyn Theatre, the Lyceum Theater in Rochester in 1926, two theaters named Majestic: Cedar Rapids, IA, and Buffalo, NY, as well as Philadelphia and Boston.

The following year, Hamilton traveled back to Europe to appear in two consecutive revues at the Palace Theatre in Montmartre, Paris. For the first, in March, she was summoned by telegram to appear in Women's Palace as a replacement for Jenny Golder (aka Rosie Sloman), as described in a letter by the English painter Edward Burra. Golder had ruptured a leg muscle and committed suicide the following year. The second, in April, was a highly popular and somewhat risqué revue entitled Women and Sport. Here her co-star and dancing partner was the much celebrated French prize fighter and World War 1 hero Georges Carpentier, who made his stage debut as both singer and dancer. It was reported that many thousands of British people went over to Paris for Easter and tried in vain to get seats. Over 6,000 were turned away from the first five performances. Femmes et Sport, as it was billed locally, was described elsewhere as, "typically Parisian, with the chorus conventionally nude in some of the scenes."

In 1928, Hamilton was promoted as "an international artist of repute, having appeared in England, France and South America", set to be a featured player in J.P. McEvoy's forthcoming Broadway musical "Americana", and in January 1929 she appeared in a short-lived Vaudeville style revue at the Fox Theater in Washington D.C. called Dr. Jazz, in which she "steps around in weird contortionist fashion in her eccentric dance", while others performed songs and comedy acrobatics. At this time Hamilton is also credited for off-stage work as Costume Designer for the 1930 Ginger Rogers film The Sap from Syracuse, filmed in New York.

== Writing associates ==
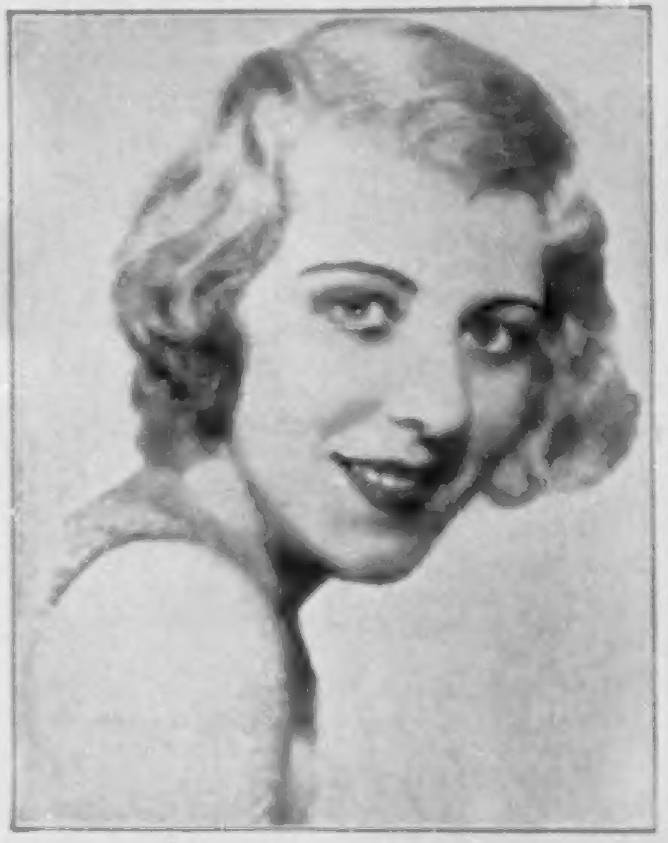
Promoting J.P. McEvoy's "Americana" musical, Billboard, 1928

Later in 1929, Hamilton went to Mexico, accompanying her good friends Ben Hecht, his wife Rose Caylor, and Charles MacArthur, a group of journalists, authors, playwrights and Hollywood screenwriters. They were there to collect material on the revolutionary fighting for their new play The Moon-Shooter, eventually released in 1935 as the film Once in a Blue Moon. Hamilton's group were among many Americans, including Charles Lindbergh and his soon-to-be wife Anne Morrow, trapped at this time in Mexico due to the revolution. Finally railroad communication was re-established and Hamilton was able to return to New York to begin rehearsals for a new musical comedy set to open that Spring.

== Return to New York ==
On June 20, 1934, after Women and Sport closed, Hamilton returned from France on the steamship S.S. Paris from Le Havre back to New York, arriving June 26, traveling on "father's papers" as "Aileen Hunter (Hamilton)" with an address at 36 W.59th St, NYC. The 1940 census finds her rooming in rented accommodation with Helen Salter at 35 Underhill Road, Ossinning Town, West Chester, New York. Salter later witnesses Aileen's marriage in Los Angeles.

== Hollywood career ==
Between 1935 and 1941, Hamilton had another spell in Europe, and returned to Beverly Hills from England around July 1941 to live with her brother, where they co-wrote the story Nothing Ventured. They sold it for $20,000 to MGM, who later released it as Slightly Dangerous, starring Lana Turner, Robert Young and Walter Brennan. In 1938, she was represented as a Hollywood writer by the Rosalie Stewart Agency.

In 1941, a newspaper reminded its readers Hamilton was "the gal who starred... in...Femme et Sport, some years ago".

In 1943, Hamilton sold the story of Christmas in Connecticut to Warner Bros., who announced Bette Davis as the female lead in February 1944. Two months later Davis was replaced by Barbara Stanwyck. The film opened in New York on July 27, 1945 to immediate success. Hamilton was again acknowledged for writing the story for Arnold Schwarzenegger's 1992 TV remake starring Dyan Cannon, Kris Kristofferson and Tony Curtis.

== Inspiration for her original story ==
According to advertisements contemporaneous to the film's launch, the credits appeared as "Screen Play by Lionel Houser and Adele Commandini • From an original story by Aileen Hamilton". There has been much analysis of Hamilton's inspiration behind the story but the most popular theory behind her Elizabeth Lane character is that it was based at least in part on Gladys Taber, who wrote the ubiquitous monthly column Diary of Domesticity in Ladies Home Journal from 1937 to 1957. Taber also had a column in Saturday Evening Post, both magazines in the Curtis Publishing fold, and was so widely published it was reported that for 50 years her work could be found in nearly every US household. In the film the column's title was slightly altered to Diary of a Housewife. Like the fictional Elizabeth Lane, Taber lived her summers in a vintage Connecticut farmhouse from 1933 and full time from 1935. She commuted to New York City to teach creative writing and US living skills to new migrants at Columbia from 1921 to 1926. By this time, both Hamilton and her brother were scriptwriters with noted success under their belts and periodically lived together. Her brother's background had been in publishing, as a cub reporter on the New York Daily Mirror, owned by William Randolph Hearst, and in the same stable were Good Housekeeping from 1905, and Cosmopolitan from 1911, both of which carried popular cookery columns. It is acknowledged that Hearst's own life story was the main inspiration for Charles Foster Kane, the lead character in Orson Welles's film Citizen Kane (1941), while Hearst's lifelong marriage to the New York vaudeville performer Millicent Willson and simultaneous long affair with the film actress and comedian Marion Davies publicly demonstrated his penchant for show women such as Hamilton. It was a badge of honor to be a working show girl at a time when one of their own had married such a wealthy media tycoon and socialized with a First Lady. Willson was frequently joined at charitable events by First Lady Eleanor Roosevelt, who also wrote for Ladies Home Journal, during the Great Depression. The additional coincidence of her having been marooned in Mexico at the same time as Lindbergh & Morrow may have later influenced Hamilton to write the baby kidnapping sub-plot into Christmas in Connecticut, not least because their son's capture and murder was what the American media called the "Crime of the Century" and, like Lindbergh, the hero of her story was a celebrated pilot. Some of these notable parallels have subsequently been opened up for discussion with regard to Hamilton's inspiration for her original novel.

== TV series ==
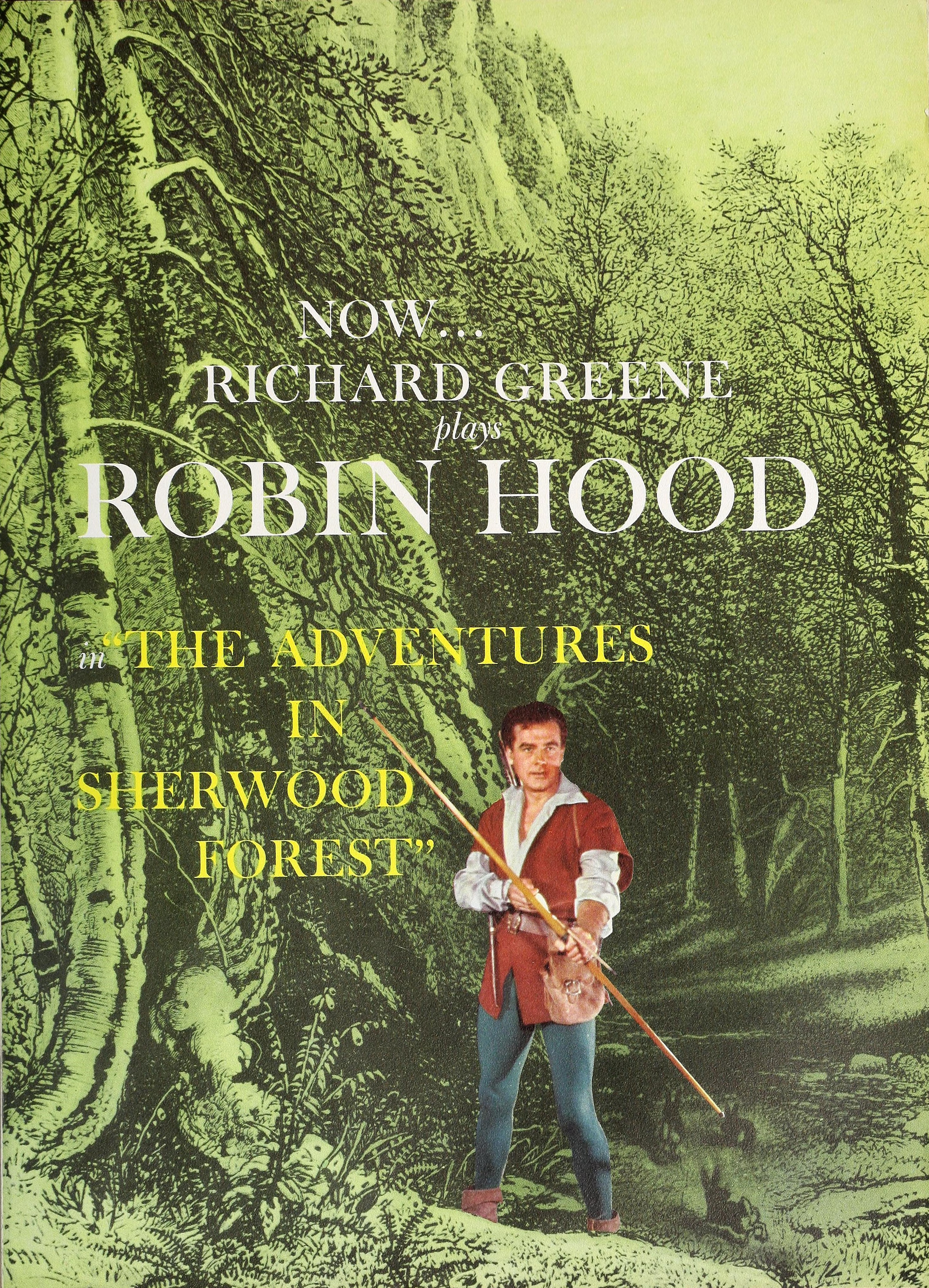
1958 advertisement featuring the series' alternative title, The Adventures in Sherwood Forest.

In 1956, Hamilton was credited as co-writer for Series 3, Episode 8 of The Millionaire: The Joey Diamond Story, a 30-minute drama airing that year on October 31.

Hamilton also wrote Series 7, Episode 12 of Lux Video Theatre, a 60-minute television adaptation of Christmas in Connecticut hosted by Ronald Reagan, which aired December 13, 1956, and the screenplay for Series 2, Episode 28 of The Adventures of Robin Hood for ITV, starring Richard Greene, titled The Borrowed Baby, which aired April 8, 1957. Sixteen episodes of the latter were co-written by her brother Ian McLellan Hunter with his friend and lifelong collaborator Ring Lardner, Jr., both former cub reporters on the New York Daily Mirror, though pseudonyms were used due to both being on the Hollywood blacklist.

== Marriage ==
On December 31, 1942, Hamilton married Burton Laffe (1907–1948), a divorcé five years her junior from New York, in Beverly Hills. The marriage certificate describes Laffe as Business Manager at Catalina Hospital. Her handwritten details read: "Aileen Ham" (her stage name Hamilton incomplete and crossed out) "Hunter", "from England; residence 923½ N. Wetherly Dr., L.A; Screen Writer; mother: Elsie E. Stevenson; father: William McLellan Hunter; witness: Helen Salter", who was her old roommate in West Chester, NY, listed in the 1940 census.

Aileen Hamilton died June 6, 1993 at the age of 91.
