= Mildred Cram =

American writer

- Born: October 17, 1889; Washington, D.C., U.S.
- Died: April 4, 1985 (aged 95); Santa Barbara, California, U.S.
- Occupations: Author; screenwriter

Mildred Cram (October 17, 1889 – April 4, 1985) was an American writer.

== Career ==
Her short story "Stranger Things" was included in the O. Henry Award story collection for 1921. A number of her stories and novels were made into films. She was nominated, along with Leo McCarey, for the Academy Award for Best Writing, Original Story, for Love Affair (1939).

Gerald Clarke wrote in his biography Get Happy: The Life of Judy Garland that Cram was Tyrone Power's favorite author. Power introduced Garland to Cram's novella Forever, which Garland could eventually "quote word for word". Over the years, several attempts were made to adapt the story, but without success. In the 1930s, Cram sold it for $15,000. It changed hands a few more times. In 1942, movie columnist Louella Parsons announced that Hedy Lamarr and Robert Taylor had been cast for a film adaptation of the story. In 1955, it was reported that Bill Bacher, co-producer of the Broadway play Seventh Heaven, had bought the play rights and would be making it into a Broadway musical.

== Family ==
Painter Allan Gilbert Cram is her brother.

== Works ==
- All the King's Horses, book-length novel, Cosmopolitan Magazine, September 1936
- Forever, novella (60 pages), Alfred A. Knopf, April 22, 1938; 13th printing, November 1954
- The Promise
- Old Seaport Towns of the South; Drawings by Allan Gilbert Cram. 1917
- Lotus Salad; Illustrated by Frederick Coffay Yohn. 1920
- Stranger Things / by Mildred Cram 1923
- Kingdom of Innocents
- Born in Time: A Re-telling of the Traditional Christmas Nativity Story
- Scotch Valley
- The Tide
- Sir

== Filmography ==
- Subway Sadie (1926) (story "Sadie of the Desert")
- Behind the Make-Up (1930) (story "The Feeder")
- This Modern Age (1931) (story "Girls Together")
- Amateur Daddy (1932) (novel Scotch Valley)
- Sinners in the Sun (1932) (story "The Beachcomber")
- Faithless (1932) (novel Tinfoil)
- Maquillage (1932), also known as Make Up (novella The Feeder)
- Stars Over Broadway (1935) (story "Thin Air")
- Mariners of the Sky/Navy Born (1936) (story)
- Wings Over Honolulu (1937) (story)
- Love Affair (1939) (story)
- Beyond Tomorrow (1940), also known as Beyond Christmas (story)
- An Affair to Remember (1957) (story)
- Love Affair (1994) (story)
