= Songs from the Pen of Jerome Kern =

1946 studio album by Irene Dunne

Studio album by Irene Dunne
- Released: October 1942 (78rpm LP); 2011 (compilation CD)
- Recorded: July 16 – August 24, 1941
- Length: 18:00
- Label: Decca Records

Songs from the Pen of Jerome Kern (Note: Also known as Irene Dunne in Songs from the Pen of Jerome Kern, Songs by Jerome Kern, Jerome Kern Songs, Irene Dunne in Songs by Jerome Kern and Irene Dunne Souvenir Album.) is an album by Irene Dunne, released by Decca Records, which contained covers of six show tunes composed by Jerome Kern. It was re-released in 2011 with other songs that Dunne had sung in movies.

== Background ==
Irene Dunne began her career performing in musical theater before being invited to Hollywood to star in the musical Leathernecking. Despite many genres in her filmography, she also sang in movies that were not musicals. She often became associated with Jerome Kern's career, starring in Hollywood, musical adaptations that included songs he composed (Sweet Adeline, Roberta, Show Boat, High, Wide, and Handsome, and Joy of Living) and had starred in The City Chap on Broadway years before in 1925.

Between July 16 and August 24, 1941, Dunne recorded a compilation album performing six Kern-composed songs with Victor Young's orchestra. The official release date is unknown but the album appeared in newspaper ads in 1946 and 1947; it was also included among other Jerome Kern cover albums with popular singers and singing movie stars.

In 2011, it was released in CD format (now named Sings Kern and Other Rarities) by audio remasters Sepia Records and included previously unissued tracks recorded during the original release, as well as alternate takes and other songs (some not created by Kern) Dunne had performed in her movies.

== Track listing ==
Although eight songs were recorded between July and August 1941, only six were published.

Original track list
No.	Title	Writer(s)	Serial number	Length
1.	"Smoke Gets in Your Eyes"	Otto Harbach	DLA 2553	3:09
2.	"I've Told Ev'ry Little Star"	Oscar Hammerstein II	DLA 2552	2:53
3.	"All The Things You Are"	Hammerstein II	DLA 2554	2:44
4.	"Why Was I Born?"	Hammerstein II	DLA 2605	3:02
5.	"Babes in the Wood"		DLA 2626	3:09
6.	"They Didn't Believe Me"	Herbert Reynolds	DLA 2679	3:01
Total length:				18:00

The six tracks were also released as three 10-inch records: "Smoke Gets in Your Eyes"/"I've Told Ev'ry Little Star", "All the Things You Are"/"Why Was I Born?", and "Babes in the Wood"/"They Didn't Believe Me".

"All the Things You Are" was an originally-rejected track. The other two tracks recorded but not included were "The Folks Who Live on the Hill" and "Make Believe". They would later be included in the CD re-release.

2011 CD re-release
No.	Title	Writer(s)	Length
7.	"Lovely to Look At" (recording used in Roberta)		3:35
8.	"When I Grow Too Old to Dream"	Oscar Hammerstein II	3:29
9.	"Show Boat Exploitation Disc 1" ("Why Do I Love You?" from Show Boat)		3:22
10.	"Show Boat Exploitation Disc 2" (megamix)		3:24
11.	"I Have the Room Above Her" (from Show Boat, with Allan Jones)		3:46
12.	"Make Believe" (from Show Boat)		3:13
13.	"They Don't Believe Me" (alternate take)		2:42
14.	"Why Was I Born?" (alternate take)		2:57
15.	"The Folks Who Live on the Hill" (from High, Wide and Handsome)	Hammerstein II	3:01
16.	"All the Things You Are" (alternate take)		2:39
17.	"Smoke Gets in Your Eyes" (alternate take)	Otto Harbach	3:00
18.	"Babes in the Wood" (alternate take)		3:03
19.	"If Love Were All"	Noël Coward	1:51
20.	"Sing My Heart" (from Love Affair)	Ted Koehler	3:30
21.	"You Couldn't Be Cuter"	Dorothy Fields	1:05
Total length:			01:02:49

== Reception ==
No sales data has been released, but it was included in the Popular Albums section in a Paris Downstairs newspaper advert, and Appeal-Democrat claimed that "the record shops are doing a landoffice [sic] business with her album". However, critical reception was negative, with comparisons to Bing Crosby's Kern album that had a similar release time: "Crosby handles the Jerome Kern tunes with considerable more facility than Miss Dunne," wrote the Latrobe Bulletin, and Betty Mead wrote, "Both Crosby and Irene Dunne present albums of Jerome Kern. Miss Dunne, unfortunately for her record, sounds better when you can see her [perform]." Meanwhile, Michael Levin wrote, "Recalling Miss Dunne's charm was more pleasant to me than listening to her singing."
