= Irene Dunne credits =

Media credits for Irene Dunne

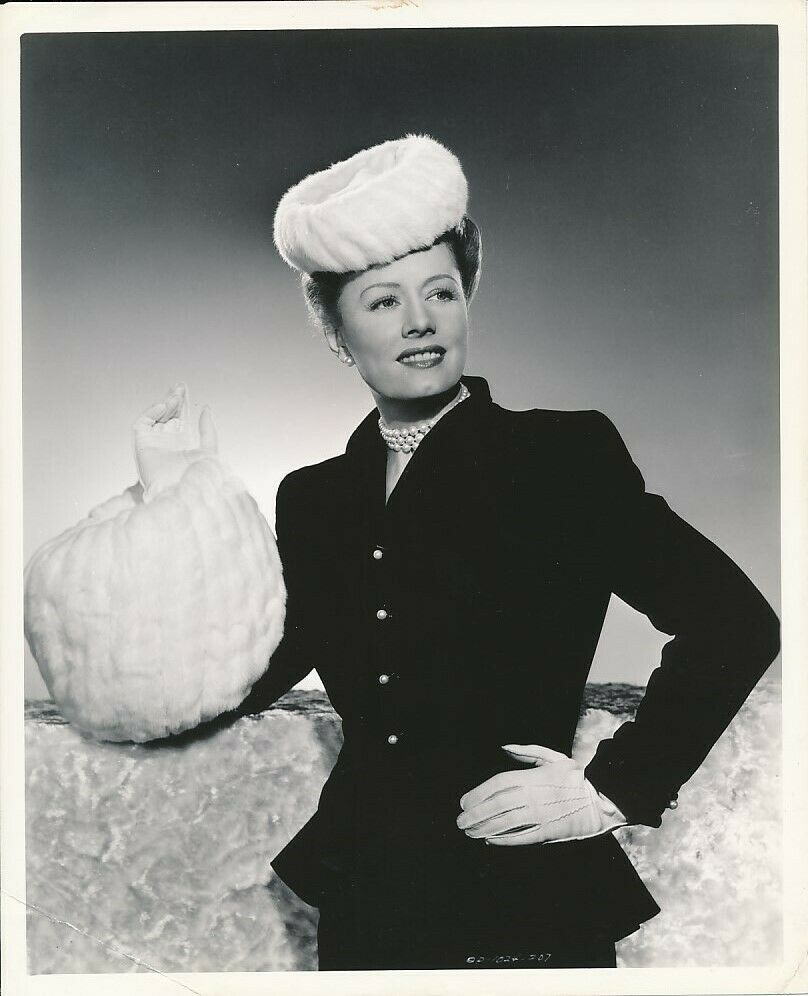
Irene Dunne in a promotional photo for Together Again

The following features lists of the film and television performances of actress and singer Irene Dunne (1898–1990), who appeared in 42 movies between 1930 and 1952, and was nominated for the Academy Award for Best Actress five times. She is best known for appearing in the screwball comedy films The Awful Truth, Theodora Goes Wild, and My Favorite Wife, as well as the romantic drama Love Affair.

== Filmography ==
Year	Title	Role	Notes	Ref(s)
1930	Leathernecking	Delphine Witherspoon		
1931	Cimarron	Sabra Cravat	Nominated—Academy Award for Best Actress	
1931	Bachelor Apartment	Helene Andrews		
1931	The Great Lover	Diana Page		
1931	Consolation Marriage	Mary Brown Porter		
1932	Symphony of Six Million	Jessica		
1932	Back Street	Ray Schmidt		
1932	Thirteen Women	Laura Stanhope		
1933	No Other Woman	Anna Stanley		
1933	The Secret of Madame Blanche	Sally Sanders St. John		
1933	The Silver Cord	Christina Phelps		
1933	Ann Vickers	Ann Vickers		
1933	If I Were Free	Sarah Cazenove		
1934	This Man Is Mine	Tony Dunlap		
1934	Stingaree	Hilda Bouverie		
1934	The Age of Innocence	Countess Ellen Olenska		
1934	Sweet Adeline	Adeline "Addie" Schmidt		
1935	Roberta	Princess Stephanie		
1935	Magnificent Obsession	Helen Hudson		
1936	Show Boat	Magnolia Hawks		
1936	Theodora Goes Wild	Theodora Lynn / Caroline Adams	Nominated—Academy Award for Best Actress	
1937	High, Wide and Handsome	Sally Watterson		
1937	The Awful Truth	Lucy Warriner	Nominated—Academy Award for Best Actress First of three films with Cary Grant	
1938	Joy of Living	Margaret "Maggie" Garret		
1939	Love Affair	Terry Mckay	Nominated—Academy Award for Best Actress First of three films with Charles Boyer	
1939	Invitation to Happiness	Eleanor Wayne		
1939	When Tomorrow Comes	Helen Lawrence	Second of three films with Charles Boyer	
1940	My Favorite Wife	Ellen Arden	Second of three films with Cary Grant	
1941	Penny Serenade	Julie Gardiner Adams	Final of three films with Cary Grant	
1941	Unfinished Business	Nancy Andrews		
1942	Lady in a Jam	Jane Palmer		
1943	A Guy Named Joe	Dorinda Durston		
1944	The White Cliffs of Dover	Susan Ashwood		
1944	Together Again	Anne Crandall	Final of three films with Charles Boyer	
1945	Over 21	Paula "Polly" Wharton		
1946	Anna and the King of Siam	Anna Owens		
1947	Life with Father	Vinnie Day	Only Technicolor film	
1948	I Remember Mama	Martha "Mama" Hanson	Nominated—Academy Award for Best Actress	
1950	Never a Dull Moment	Kay Kingsley Heyward		
1950	The Mudlark	Queen Victoria		
1952	It Grows on Trees	Polly Baxter		

=== Appearing as herself ===
Year	Title	Note
1931	The Stolen Jools	Film produced for charity by the Masquers Club
1943	Show Business at War	The March of Time film
1949	American Red Cross Fund Appeal	Two-minute public service announcement
1951	You Can Change the World	Filmed in 1949; Produced by The Christophers
c. 1956	A Story of Two Men	Produced by The Christophers; Dunne introduced the special

== Radio appearances ==
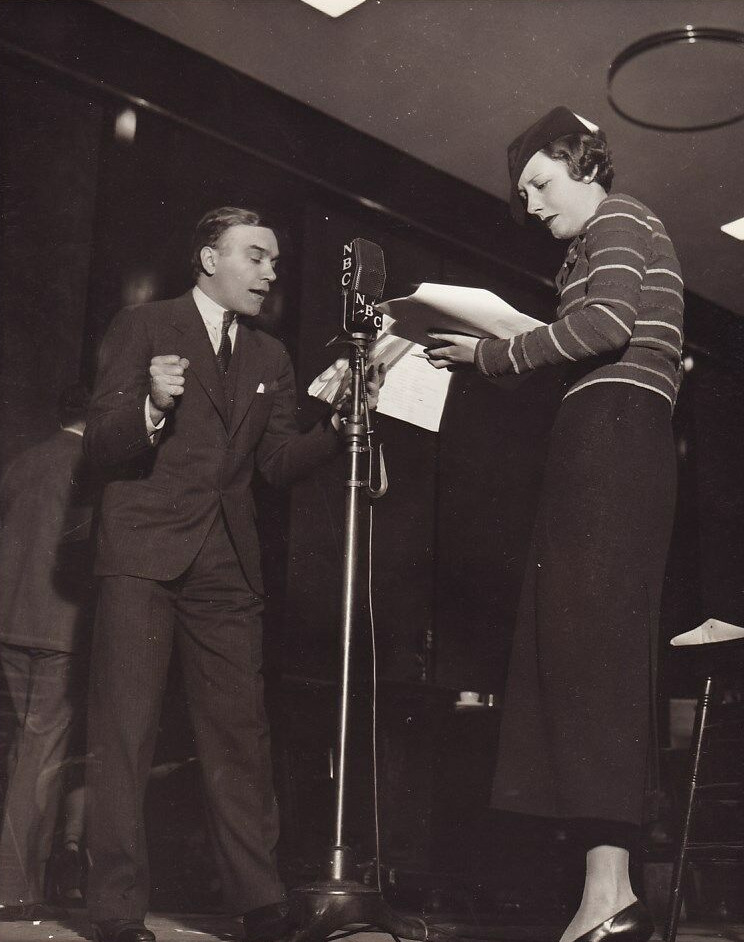
Dunne performing "Secrets" on Radio Lux Theatre at NBC Radio with George Baxter. (May 6, 1935)

Year	Program	Episode	Notes	Ref
1935	Lux Radio Theater	Secrets		
1936	Lux Radio Theater	Bittersweet		
1937	Lux Radio Theater	Magnificent Obsession		
1938	Lux Radio Theater	Theodora Goes Wild		
1939	The Screen Guild Theater	Alone in Paris		
1939	Lux Radio Theater	The Sisters		
1939	Lux Radio Theater	The Awful Truth		
1940	Lux Radio Theater	Love Affair	Performed with William Powell (Note: Dunne performed in two versions of Love Affair for Lux Radio Theater. The 1940 version was performed with William Powell, whereas the 1942 version was performed with her movie co-star Charles Boyer.)	
1940	Lux Radio Theater	Show Boat		
1941	The Screen Guild Theater	My Favorite Wife		
1941	Lux Radio Theater	Unfinished Business		
1941	Lux Radio Theater	The Awful Truth	New recording, using the script from the 1939 version	
1941	The Screen Guild Theater	Penny Serenade		
1941	Cavalcade of America	Cimmarron		
1942	Lux Radio Theater	Love Affair	Performed with Charles Boyer	
1942	Lux Radio Theater	To Mary with Love		
1943	The Screen Guild Theater	Theodora Goes Wild		
1944	Lux Radio Theater	Penny Seranade		
1946	The Screen Guild Theater	Over 21		
1946	Lux Radio Theatre	Together Again	Performed with Walter Pidgeon (Note: Dunne performed with Walter Pidgeon and Charles Boyer (Dunne's movie co-star) respectively. Together Again with Walter Pidgeon was performed on Lux Radio Theater in 1946 on The Screen Guild Theater in 1949, but it not known whether these were two different performances or if the Lux Radio version was re-aired on Screen Guild. However, the second Screen Guild version from 1951 was performed with Charles Boyer.)	
1947	Lux Radio Theatre	Anna and the King of Siam (Note: Like Love Affair, Dunne performed in two versions of Anna and the King of Siam for Lux Radio Theater: 1947 with Rex Harrison, and 1949 with James Mason.)		
1948	The Screen Guild Theater	Brief Encounter		
1948	Lux Radio Theater	I Remember Mama		
1949	Lux Radio Theater	Anna and the King of Siam	Performed with James Mason	
1949	The Screen Guild Theater	Together Again	Performed with Charles Boyer	
1949	Lux Radio Theater	Mr. Blandings Builds His Dream House		
1949	The Cavalcade Of America	Citizen Mama		
1951	The Screen Guild Theater	Together Again	Version with Charles Boyer	
1951	Lux Radio Theater	The Mudlark		
1952	Family Theater	The Crossroads of Christmas		
1952–53	Bright Star		31 episodes	
1953	Lux Radio Theater	June Bride		

== Television credits ==
Air date	Television show	Episode(s)	Role	Ref
1952-1953	Schlitz Playhouse of Stars	1. "A Quarter for Your Trouble" (May 30, 1952); 2. "Souvenir from Singapore" (June 6, 1952); 3. "Dress in the Window" (May 13, 1952); 4. "Say Hello to Pamela" (June 20, 1952); 5. "The Von Linden File" (June 27, 1952); 6. "The House of Death/Death House" (July 4, 1952); 7. "A Southern Lady" (July 11, 1952); 8. "Early Space Conquerors" (July 18, 1952); 9. "A Man's World" (July 25, 1952); 10. "Crossroads" (August 1, 1952); 11. "So Help Me" (August 8, 1952); 12. "Double Exposure" (August 15, 1952); 13. "Mr. and Mrs. Trubble" (August 22, 1952); 14. "Port of Call" (August 29, 1952); 15. "Homecoming" (September 5, 1952); 16. "The Marriage of Lit-Lit" (September 12, 1952); 17. "I Want to Be a Star" (September 19, 1952); 18. "The Trail" (September 26, 1952); 19. "Come What May" (October 3, 1951); 20. "Trouble on Pier 12" (October 10, 1952); 21. "This Plane for Hire" (October 17, 1952); 22. "Drawing Room A" (October 24, 1952); 23. "Enchanted Evening" (October 31, 1952); 24. "Tango" (November 7, 1952); 25. "The House of Pride" (November 14, 1952); 26. "The Pussyfootin' Rocks" (November 21, 1952)	Episode host	
February 1, 1953	What's My Line?	Season 4, Episode 22	Episode's mystery guest	
December 6, 1953	The Jack Benny Program	"The Irene Dunne Show" (Note: Also known as "Irene Dunne Film")	As herself	
April 15, 1954	Ford Theatre	"Sister Veronica"	Sister Veronica	
April 20, 1954	Suspense	"The Open Transform" (Season 6)	Episode host	
February 3, 1955	Ford Theatre	"Touch of Spring"	Marion Clark	
October 30, 1955	The Loretta Young Show	"Slander"	Episode host	
November 6, 1955	The Loretta Young Show	"Tropical Secretary"	Episode host	
1956	Cheaper by the Dozen	Television pilot	[role is unknown]	
April 12, 1956	Ford Theatre	"On the Beach"	Janet Wilson	
May 24, 1956	Ford Theatre	"Sheila"	Sheila Chester	
September 15, 1956	The Perry Como Show		Episode guest; performed with Como in "The Irene Dunne Hit Revenue"	
October 20, 1957	What's My Line?	Episode 385 (Season 9, Ep 8)	Episode's mystery guest	
October 5, 1959	The DuPont Show with June Allyson	"The Opening Door"	Dr. Gina Kerstas	
November 5, 1959	The Big Party	—	Episode host	
October 26, 1961	Frontier Circus	"Dr. Sam"	Dr. Sam Applewhite	
January 15, 1962	Insight	"Beelzebub & the Bolsheviks"	Gertrude le Forte	
January 28, 1962	General Electric Theater	"Go Fight City Hall"	Margaret Henderson	
October 15, 1962	Saints and Sinners	"Source of Information"	Anita Farrell	
