= Ella Fitzgerald Sings the Harold Arlen Song Book =

Studio album by Ella Fitzgerald
- Released: 1961
- Recorded: August 1, 1960 – January 14, 1961
- Genre: Jazz
- Length: 1:41:01
- Label: Verve
- Producer: Norman Granz

Ella Fitzgerald chronology
Ella Fitzgerald Sings Songs from "Let No Man Write My Epitaph" (1961)	Ella Fitzgerald Sings the Harold Arlen Song Book (1961)	Clap Hands, Here Comes Charlie! (1961)

Professional ratings
Review scores
Source	Rating
AllMusic	4.5/5 stars
Encyclopedia of Popular Music	4/5 stars
The Penguin Guide to Jazz Recordings	4/4 stars

Ella Fitzgerald Sings the Harold Arlen Song Book is a 1961 (see 1961 in music) album by the American jazz singer Ella Fitzgerald, with a studio orchestra conducted and arranged by Billy May. This album marked the only time that Fitzgerald worked with May.

The Harold Arlen Song Book is the sixth album in Fitzgerald's series of recordings of songs written by the pantheon of Broadway composers who formed the body of work now considered the Great American Songbook.

The cover art is a drawing by Henri Matisse.

== Track listing ==
For the 2-LP set originally released on the Verve label in 1961: Verve MG V-4046-2

All songs composed by Harold Arlen, with lyricists indicated.

Side One:

1. "Blues in the Night" (Johnny Mercer) – 7:14
2. "Let's Fall in Love" (Ted Koehler) – 4:05
3. "Stormy Weather" (Koehler) – 5:17
4. "Between the Devil and the Deep Blue Sea" (Koehler) – 2:26
5. "My Shining Hour" (Mercer) – 4:02
6. "Hooray for Love" (Leo Robin) – 2:45

Side Two:

1. "This Time the Dream's on Me" (Mercer) – 4:39
2. "That Old Black Magic" (Mercer) – 4:13
3. "I've Got the World on a String" (Koehler) – 4:54
4. "Let's Take a Walk Around the Block" (Ira Gershwin, E.Y. Harburg) – 4:03
5. "Ill Wind" (Koehler) – 3:55
6. "Ac-Cent-Tchu-Ate the Positive" (Mercer) – 3:37

Side Three:

1. "When the Sun Comes Out" (Koehler) – 5:10
2. "Come Rain or Come Shine" (Mercer) – 3:24
3. "As Long as I Live" (Koehler) – 3:48
4. "Happiness Is a Thing Called Joe" (Harburg) – 3:30
5. "It's Only a Paper Moon" (Harburg, Billy Rose) – 3:37
6. "The Man That Got Away" (Gershwin) – 5:21

Side Four:

1. "One for My Baby (and One More for the Road)" (Mercer) – 3:58
2. "It Was Written in the Stars" (Robin) – 5:11
3. "Get Happy" (Koehler) – 3:33
4. "I Gotta Right to Sing the Blues" (Koehler) – 5:12
5. "Out of This World" (Mercer) – 2:46
6. "Over the Rainbow" (Harburg) – 4:21

The first re-issue in 1984 added two previously unreleased bonus tracks; both were included on the 2001 re-issue.

Disc One:

4. "Ding-Dong! The Witch Is Dead" (Harburg) – 3:19

Disc Two:

12. "Sing My Heart" (Koehler) – 2:49

Bonus tracks issued on the 2001 Verve 2CD Reissue, 589108:

27. "Let's Take a Walk Around the Block" (Alternative take) – 4:07
28. "Sing My Heart" (Alternative take) – 2:32

== Personnel ==
Recorded in five sessions from August 1, 1960 – July 14, 1961 in Hollywood, Los Angeles.

- Ella Fitzgerald – Vocals
- Billy May – Arranger, conductor

Orchestra

- Trumpet – Don Fagerquist, Frank Beach, Conrad Gozzo, Joseph Tiscari
- Trombone – Milt Bernhart, Edward Kusby, Richard Noel
- Bass trombone – George Roberts
- Alto saxophone – Benny Carter
- Tenor saxophone – Plas Johnson
- Woodwind, flute – Harry Klee, Justin Gordon, Wilbur Schwartz
- Vibraphone – Emil Richards
- Piano – Paul Smith
- Guitar – John Collins
- Double bass – Joe Mondragon
- Drums – Alvin Stoller
- String section
  - Violin – Israel Baker, Victor Arno, Victor Bay, Alex Beller, Dan Lube, Erno Neufeld, Lou Raderman, Nathan Ross, Sidney Sharp, Gerald Vinci
  - Viola – Alex Neimann, Paul Robyn, Barbara Simons
  - Cello – Armand Kaproff, Ray Kramer, Eleanor Slatkin
- Norman Granz – Production
- Val Valentin – Engineer
