= Irene Dunne =

American actress (1898–1990)

Irene Dunne DHS
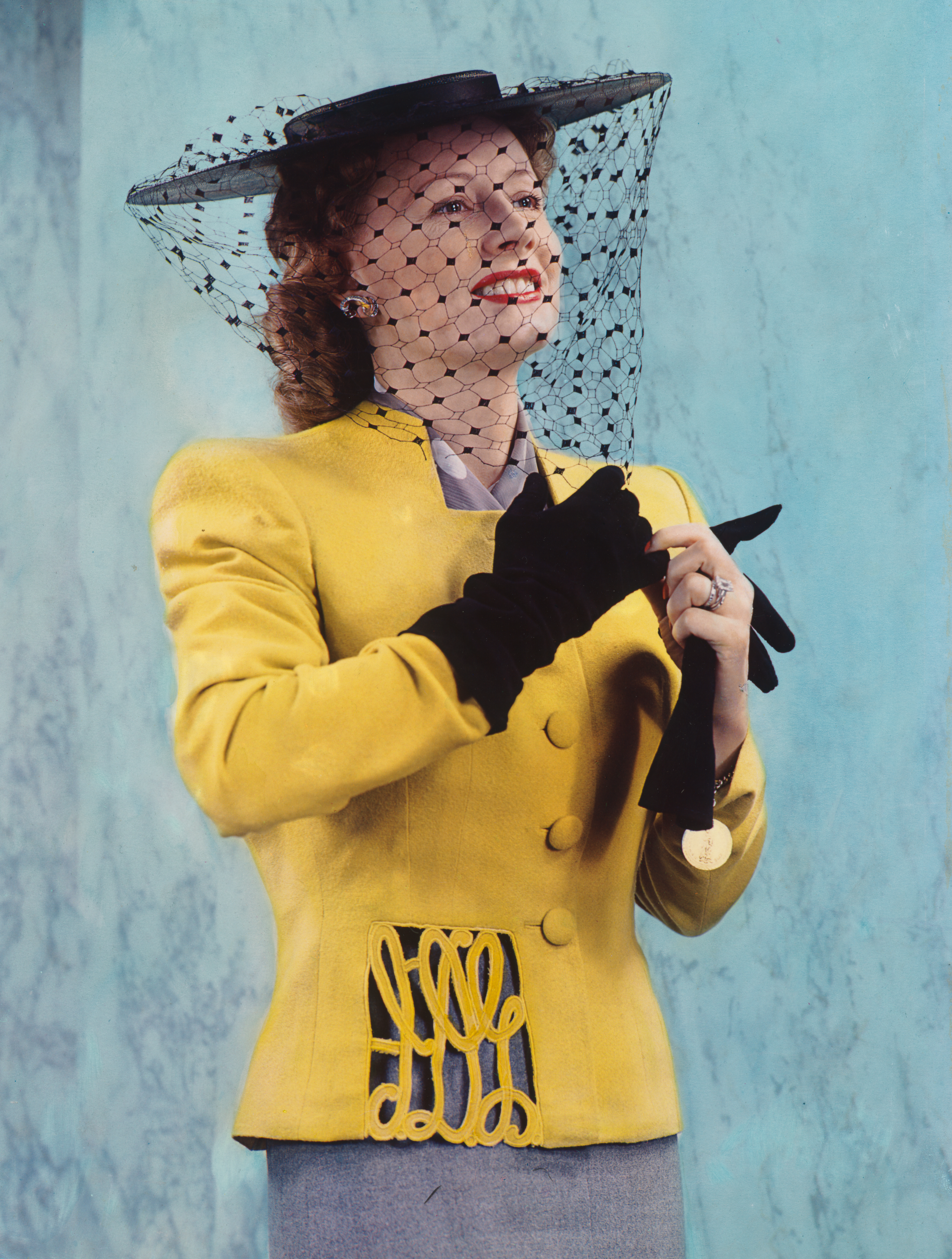
- Dunne in 1944
- Born: Irene Marie Dunne; December 20, 1898; Louisville, Kentucky, U.S.
- Died: September 4, 1990 (aged 91); Los Angeles, California, U.S.
- Other names: The First Lady of Hollywood; Irene Dunne Griffin
- Education: University of Indianapolis; Chicago Musical College
- Occupation: Actress
- Years active: 1920–1987
- Known for: Show Boat; Cimarron; Theodora Goes Wild; The Awful Truth; Love Affair; I Remember Mama; Penny Serenade; My Favorite Wife
- Title: Dame of the Holy Sepulchre; Delegate to the United Nations; President of Santa Monica's St. John's Hospital Guild; Chairman of the Field Army American Cancer Society; Co-Chairman of the American Heart Association; Co-Chairman of the American Red Cross
- Political party: Republican
- Board member of: Technicolor (1965); California Arts Commission (1967–1970)
- Spouse: Francis Dennis Griffin (m. 1927; died 1965)
- Children: 1
- Awards: See list
- Musical career
- Genres: Popular; Show tune
- Instrument: Vocals
- Label: Decca Records
- Irene Dunne's singing voice Snippet of Dunne performing "Sing My Heart" in Love Affair
- Website: irenedunneguild.org

Irene Dunne (born Irene Marie Dunn; (Note: According to Dunne's baptism record, her full name is "Irene Maria Dunn," however, some news reports (including an interview) have written "Marie" instead of "Maria." Her birth record does not include her middle name, and the 1900 census writes "Irene M. Dunn," whereas the 1920 census only writes "Dunn, Irene." Whichever is a spelling error is unknown.) December 20, 1898 – September 4, 1990) was an American actress who appeared in films during the Golden Age of Hollywood. She is best known for her comedic roles, though she performed in films of other genres.

After her father died when she was 14, Dunne's family relocated from Kentucky to Indiana. She was determined to become an opera singer, but when she was rejected by The Met, she performed in musicals on Broadway until she was scouted by RKO and made her Hollywood film debut in the musical Leathernecking (1930). She later starred in the successful musical Show Boat (1936).

Dunne starred in 42 movies and was nominated five times for the Academy Award for Best Actress—for her performances in the western drama Cimarron (1931), the screwball comedies Theodora Goes Wild (1936) and The Awful Truth (1937), the romance Love Affair (1939), and the drama I Remember Mama (1948). Dunne is considered one of the finest actresses never to have won an Academy Award. She is also regarded as one of the best comedic actresses in the screwball genre. Her last film role was in 1952, and she also starred in numerous television anthology episodes and performed on radio. Dunne was nicknamed "The First Lady of Hollywood" for her regal manner despite being proud of her Irish-American, country-girl roots.

Dunne devoted her retirement to philanthropy. She was chosen by President Dwight D. Eisenhower as a delegate for the United States to the United Nations; in that capacity, she advocated for world peace and highlighted refugee-relief programs. Dunne received a Laetare Medal from the University of Notre Dame, and a papal knighthood—Dame of the Order of the Holy Sepulchre. In 1985, she was awarded a Kennedy Center Honor for her services to the arts.

== Early life ==
Irene Marie Dunn was born on December 20, 1898, at 507 East Gray Street in Louisville, Kentucky, to Joseph John Dunn, an Irish-American steamboat engineer and inspector for the United States government, and Adelaide Antoinette Dunn (née Henry), a concert pianist and music teacher of German descent from Newport, Kentucky. She was their second child and second daughter, and had a younger brother named Charles; Dunne's elder sister died soon after her birth. The family alternated between living in Kentucky and St. Louis due to her father's job offers. He died in April 1913 from a kidney infection when she was fourteen. (Note: Joseph Dunn's death has also been reported as happening in 1909 when Dunne was eleven, but this was most likely at the time when Dunne was trying to conceal her real age from the Hollywood media.) She saved all of his letters and remembered, indeed lived by, what he told her the night before he died: "Happiness is never an accident. It is the prize we get when we choose wisely from life's great stores." (Note: The full quote: "Happiness is never an accident. It is the prize we get when we choose wisely from life's great stores. So don't reach out wildly for this and that and the other thing. You'll end up empty-handed if you do. Make up your mind what you want. Go after it. And be prepared to pay well for it. I hope that you'll go after the rooted things: the self-respect that comes when we accept our share of responsibility. Satisfying work. Marriage. A home. A family. For these are the things that grow better with time, not less. These things are the bulwarks of happiness." Dunne only quoted the last three sentences to American Magazine in 1944.)

Following her father's death, Dunne's family moved to her mother's hometown of Madison, Indiana, living on W. Second St., in the same neighborhood as Dunne's grandparents. Dunne's mother taught her to play the piano as a very small girl — according to Dunne, "Music was as natural as breathing in our house," — but unfortunately for her, music lessons frequently prevented her from playing with the neighborhood kids. Her first school production of A Midsummer Night's Dream began her interest in drama, so she took singing lessons as well, and sang in local churches and high school plays before her graduation in 1916. Wanting to become a music teacher, she studied at the Indianapolis Conservatory of Music, earning a diploma in 1918. Later, she auditioned for the Chicago Musical College when she visited friends during a journey to Gary, Indiana, and won a college scholarship, officially graduating in 1926. Hoping to become a soprano opera singer, she moved to New York after finishing her second year in 1920, but failed two auditions with the Metropolitan Opera Company due to her inexperience and her "slight" voice.

== Career ==
=== 1920–1929: Acting beginnings, Broadway debut ===
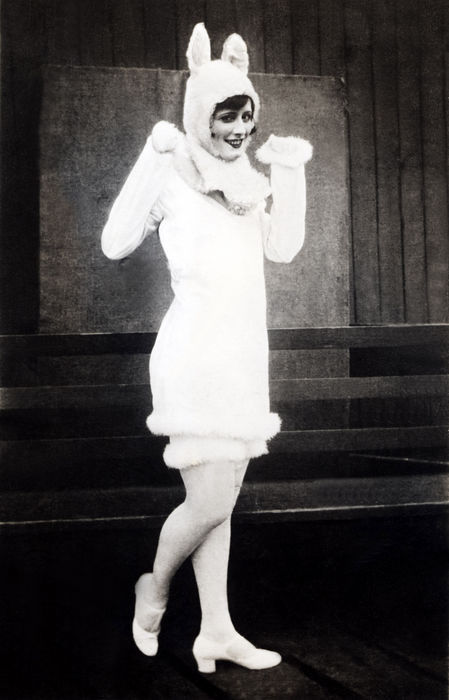
Dunne dressed as a rabbit for a Broadway show, mid-1920s

Dunne took more singing lessons and then dancing lessons to prepare for a possible career in musical theater. For many years she was a student of voice teacher and contralto Amy Ellerman. On a New York vacation to visit family friends, she was recommended to audition for a stage musical, eventually starring as the leading role in the popular play Irene, which toured major cities as a roadshow throughout 1921. "Back in New York," Dunne reflected, "I thought that with my experience on the road and musical education it would be easy to win a role. It wasn't." Her Broadway debut was December 25 the following year as Tessie in Zelda Sears's The Clinging Vine. She understudied Peggy Wood, playing the role several times in February 1923. She then obtained the leading role when the original actress took a leave of absence in 1924. She replaced Leeta Corder in the lead role of Virginia Warewell in Ginger (1923) for the final few weeks on the production. She was also a replacement in Lollipop (1924) on Broadway. Supporting roles in musical theater productions followed in the shows The City Chap (1925), Yours Truly (1927) and She's My Baby (1928). Her first top-billing, leading role Luckee Girl (1928) was not as successful as her previous projects. She would later call her career beginnings "not great furor." At this time, Dunne added the extra "e" to her surname, (Note: Dunne later told the audience of a film retrospective that she initially considered the stage name "Irene Barkley", after an uncle.) which had ironically been misspelled as "Dunne" at times throughout her life until this point; until her death, "Dunne" would then occasionally be misspelled as "Dunn". Starring as Magnolia Hawks in a road company adaptation of Show Boat was the result of a chance meeting with its director Florenz Ziegfeld Jr. (Note: Ziegfeld's father founded Chicago Musical College.) in an elevator the day she returned from her honeymoon, when he mistook her for his next potential client, eventually sending his secretary to chase after her. (Note: Magnolia Hawks had been a dream role for Dunne and she had bought the sheet music of the musical to practice, so this story was jokingly disputed by American Magazine with the comment: "Neither you not I nor [her husband] would ever suspect that she deliberately went to Florenz Ziegfeld [Jr] and suggested that she'd like to play Magnolia in the road company.") A talent scout for RKO Pictures attended a performance, and Dunne signed the studio's contract, appearing in her first movie, Leathernecking (1930), an adaptation of the musical Present Arms. Already in her 30s when she made her first film, she would be in competition with younger actresses for roles, and found it advantageous to evade questions that would reveal her age, so publicists encouraged the belief that she was born in 1901 or 1904; the former is the date engraved on her tombstone.

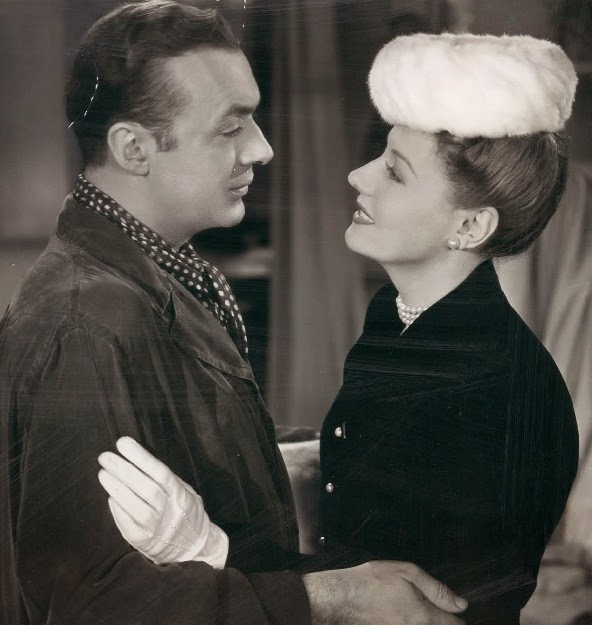
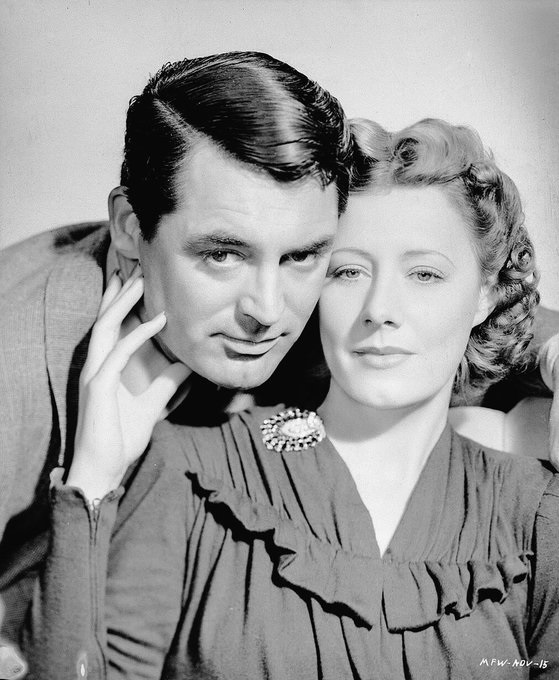
Dunne starred in three films each with Charles Boyer and Cary Grant. These pairings were popular with audiences and critics alike.

=== 1930–1949: Hollywood leading lady ===
The "Hollywood musical" era had fizzled out, so Dunne moved to dramatic roles during the Pre-Code era, leading a successful campaign for the role of Sabra in Cimarron (1931) with her soon-to-be co-star Richard Dix, earning her first Best Actress nomination. A Photoplay review declared, "[This movie] starts Irene Dunne off as one of our greatest screen artists." Other dramas included Back Street (1932) and No Other Woman (1933); for Magnificent Obsession (1935), she reportedly studied Braille and focused on her posture with blind consultant Ruby Fruth. This was after she and Dix reunited for Stingaree (1934), where overall consensus from critics was that Dunne had usurped Dix's star power. Under a new contract with Warner Bros., the remake of Sweet Adeline (1934) and Roberta (1935) were Dunne's first two musicals since Leathernecking. Roberta also starred dancing partners Fred Astaire and Ginger Rogers, and Dunne sang four songs including "Smoke Gets in Your Eyes". (Note: Credited as "(When Your Heart's on Fire) Smoke Gets in Your Eyes", according to the movie's official song sheet.) In 1936, she starred as Magnolia Hawks in Show Boat (1936), directed by James Whale. Dunne had concerns about Whale's directing decisions, but she later admitted that her favorite scene to film was "Make Believe" with Allan Jones because the blocking reminded her of Romeo and Juliet. It was during this year that Dunne's Warner Bros. contract had expired and she had decided to become a freelance actor, with the power to choose studios and directors. She was apprehensive about attempting her first comedy role as the title character in Theodora Goes Wild (1936), but discovered that she enjoyed the production process, and received her second Best Actress Oscar nomination for the performance.

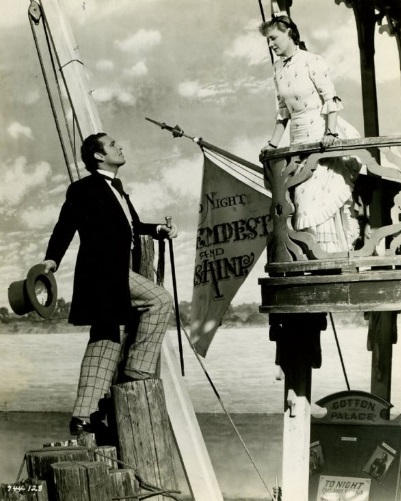
Magnolia singing "Make Believe" with Allan Jones made Dunne fantasize she was in Romeo and Juliet. She later said, "Allan and I put our hearts (and lungs) into it [as] if we had really been doing a Shakespearean play."

Dunne followed Theodora Goes Wild with other romantic and comedic roles. The Awful Truth (1937) was the first of three films also starring Cary Grant and was later voted the 68th best comedy in American cinema history by the American Film Institute. Their screwball comedy My Favorite Wife (1940) was praised as an excellent spiritual successor, whereas Penny Serenade (1941) was a "romantic comedy that frequently embraced melodrama." Dunne also starred in three films with Charles Boyer: Love Affair (1939), When Tomorrow Comes (1939), and Together Again (1944). Love Affair was such an unexpected critical and financial success that the rest of Dunne and Boyer's films were judged against it; When Tomorrow Comes was considered the most disappointing of the "trilogy," and the advertising for Together Again promoted the actors' reunion more than the movie. Dunne and Grant were praised as one of the best romantic comedy couples, while the Dunne and Boyer pairing was praised as the most romantic in Hollywood.

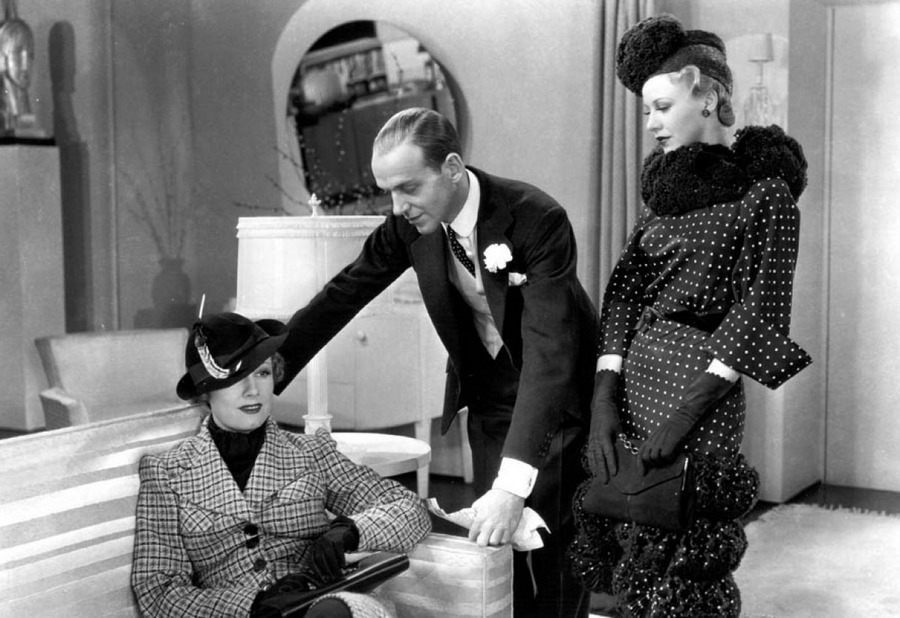
Irene Dunne, Fred Astaire and Ginger Rogers in the film Roberta, 1935

On her own, Dunne showed versatility through many film genres. Critics praised her comedic skills in Unfinished Business (1941) and Lady in a Jam (1942), despite both movies' negative reception. When the United States entered the Second World War, Dunne participated in celebrity war bond tours around the country, announcing at a rally in 1942, "This is no time for comedy. I'm now a saleswoman, I sell bonds." She followed the tour with her only two war films: A Guy Named Joe (1943) (Note: A Guy Named Joe was released in December 1943, but the AFI Catalog website writes that it was released in March 1944.) and The White Cliffs of Dover (1944). Despite A Guy Named Joe's troubled production and mixed reviews, it was one of the most successful films of the year. Over 21 (1945) was Dunne's return to comedy but the themes of war (such as her character's husband enlisting in the army) immediately dated the story, which may have contributed to its lack of success. Strong but ladylike motherly roles in the vein of Cimarron's Sabra would follow throughout her next films, such as Anna Leonowens in the fictionalized biopic Anna and the King of Siam (1946), and mothers Vinnie Day in Life with Father (1947), and Marta Hanson in I Remember Mama (1948). Dunne openly disliked Vinnie's ditziness and had rejected Life with Father numerous times, eventually taking the role because "it seemed to be rewarding enough to be in a good picture that everyone will see." For I Remember Mama, Dunne worked on her Norwegian accent with dialect coach Judith Sater, and wore body padding to appear heavier; Marta Hanson was her fifth and final Best Actress nomination.

=== 1950–1962: Declining movie-star power ===
Dunne's last three films were box-office failures. The comedy Never a Dull Moment (1950) was accused of trying too hard. Dunne was excited to portray Queen Victoria in The Mudlark (1950) for a chance to "hide" behind a role with heavy makeup and latex prosthetics. It was a success in the UK, despite initial critical concern over the only foreigner in a British film starring as a well-known British monarch, but her American fans disapproved of the prosthetic decisions. The comedy It Grows on Trees (1952) became Dunne's last movie performance, although she remained on the lookout for suitable film scripts for years afterwards. She filmed a television pilot based on Cheaper by the Dozen that was not picked up. On the radio, she and Fred MacMurray respectively played a feuding editor and reporter of a struggling newspaper in the 52-episode comedy-drama Bright Star, which aired in syndication between 1952 and 1953 by the Ziv Company. She also starred in and hosted episodes of television anthologies, such as Ford Theatre, General Electric Theater, and the Schlitz Playhouse of Stars. Faye Emerson wrote in 1954, "I hope we see much more of Miss Dunne on TV," and Nick Adams called Dunne's performance in Saints and Sinners worthy of an Emmy nomination. Dunne's last acting credit was in 1962, but she was once rumored to star in unmaterialized movies named Heaven Train and The Wisdom of the Serpent, and rejected an offer to cameo in Airport '77. In 1954, Hedda Hopper reported a rumor that Dunne would star alongside Robert Mitchum in Charles Laughton's stage adaptation of The Web and the Rock. "I never formally retired," Dunne later explained, "but an awful lot of the girls my age soldiered on in bad vehicles. [I] couldn't run around with an ax in my hand like Bette [Davis] and Joan [Crawford] did to keep things going."

== Hollywood retirement ==
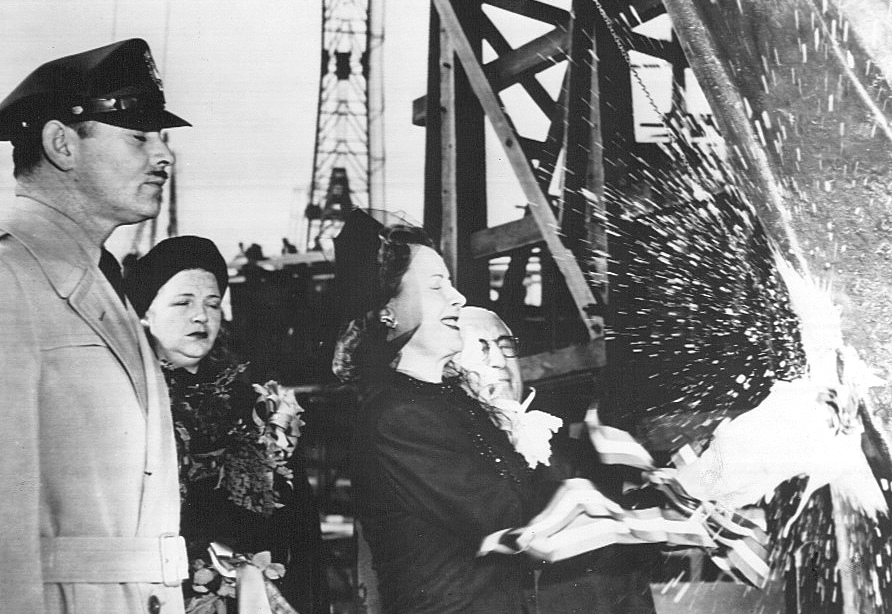
Dunne christens SS Carole Lombard next to Louis B. Mayer. Standing behind her is Clark Gable, Carole Lombard's widower, and Lombard's secretary Madalynne Field.

Dunne was a presenter at the 1950 BAFTAs when she was in London filming The Mudlark, and then represented Hollywood for the 12th Venice International Film Festival in 1951. She later appeared at 1953's March of Dimes showcase in New York City to introduce two little girls nicknamed the Poster Children, who performed a dramatization about polio research.

She accepted Walt Disney's offer to present at Disneyland's "Dedication Day" in 1955, and christened the Mark Twain Riverboat with a bottle containing water from several major rivers across the United States. Years before, Dunne had also christened the SS Carole Lombard.

Dunne was the only actress to be appointed a member of the California Arts Commission between 1967 and 1970. The three years were spent developing a museum exhibit called "Dimension" for visually impaired visitors which officially opened on January 12, 1970, in the M.H. de Young Memorial Museum, and toured California for eleven months. Dunne recorded a talking booklet, explaining the history of the 30 sculptures on display and inviting guests to touch.

=== Activism ===
During the Second World War, Dunne joined the Beverly Hills United Service Organization, and co-founded the Clark Gable's Hollywood Victory Committee. It organized servicemen entertainment and war-bond sales tours on behalf of willing Hollywood participants. (Note: A few video clips of Dunne during bond tours appeared in the movies Show Business at War (1943) and Follow the Boys (1944).) The National War Savings Program awarded her a certificate for her work from their Treasury Department.

In her retirement, she devoted herself primarily to humanitarianism. Some of the organizations she worked with include the Sister Kenny Foundation, the American Cancer Society (becoming Chairwoman of its Field Army in 1948), the Los Angeles Orphanage, the Archdiocesan Council of Catholic Women, and was Co-Chairman of the American Red Cross. She was elected president of Santa Monica's St. John's Hospital and Health Clinic in 1950 (she resigned in 1966 to work in the developing council) and became a board member of Technicolor in 1965, the first woman ever elected to the board of directors. She established an African American school for Los Angeles, negotiated donations to St. John's through box office results, and served as chair of the Hebrew University Rebuilding Fund's sponsors committee. Harold Stassen appointed her chairwoman for the American Heart Association's women's committee on February 7, 1949, and she held the position until February 28. She appeared in a celebrity-rostered television special Benefit Show for Retarded Children (1955) with Jack Benny as host. Dunne also donated to refurbishments in Madison, Indiana, funding the manufacture of Camp Louis Ernst Boy Scout's gate in 1939 and the Broadway Fountain's 1976 restoration. In 1987, she founded the Irene Dunne Guild, a foundation which remains "instrumental in raising funds to support programs and services at St. John's." It was reported that the Guild had raised $20 million by the time of her death.

Dunne reflected in 1951: "If I began living in Hollywood today, I would certainly do one thing that I did when I arrived, and that is to be active in charity. If one is going to take something out of a community—any community—one must put something in, too." She also hoped that charity would encourage submissive women to find independence: "I wish women would be more direct. [...] I was amazed when some quiet little mouse of a woman was given a job which seemed to be out of all proportion to her capabilities. Then I saw the drive with which she undertook that job and put it through to a great finish. It was both inspiring and surprising. I want women to be individuals. They should not lean on their husbands' opinions and be merely echoes of the men of the family[.]"

=== American delegate to the United Nations ===
In 1957, President Eisenhower appointed Dunne one of five alternative U.S. delegates to the United Nations in recognition of her interest in international affairs and Roman Catholic and Republican causes. Dunne admired the U.N.'s dedication to creating world peace, and was inspired by colleagues' beliefs that Hollywood influenced the world. On September 12, she was sworn in with Herman B Wells, Walter H. Judd, A. S. J. Carnahan, Philip M. Klutznick and George Meany. She held delegacy for two years and addressed the General Assembly twice. She gave her delegacy its own anthem: "Getting to Know You" because "it's so simple, and yet so fundamental in international relations today." Dunne later described her Assembly request for $21 million to help Palestinian refugees as her "biggest thrill," and called her delegacy career the "highlight of my life." She also concluded, "I came away greatly impressed with the work the U.N. does in its limited field—and it does have certain limits. I think we averted a serious situation in Syria, which might have been much worse without a forum to hear it... And I'm much impressed with the work the U.N. agencies do. I'm especially interested in UNICEF's work with children[,] and the health organization [.]"

=== Political views ===
Dunne was a lifelong Republican and served as a member of the Californian delegation in 1948's Republican National Convention and campaigned for Thomas Dewey in the 1944 United States presidential election and Ronald Reagan in the 1966 California gubernatorial election. She accepted the U.N. delegacy offer because she viewed the U.N. as apolitical. She later explained: "I'm a Nixon Republican, not a Goldwater one. (Note: Dunne supported Nixon in the 1950 United States Senate election in California and Goldwater in the 1964 United States presidential election. She also seconded Earl Warren's vice presidential nomination in 1948.) I don't like extremism in any case. The extreme rights do as much harm as the extreme lefts." Her large input in politics created an assumption that she was a member of the "Hollywood right-wing fringe," which Dunne denied, calling herself "foolish" for being involved years before other celebrities did.

== Personal life ==
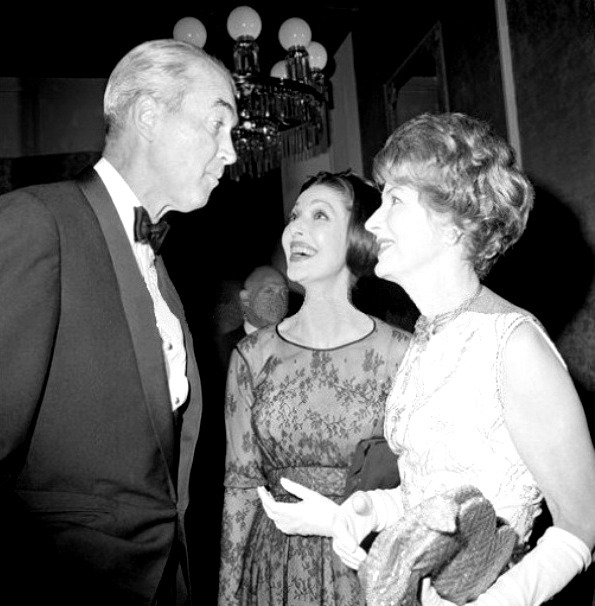
Dunne with James Stewart and Loretta Young at Samuel Goldwyn's party (August 30, 1962)

Dunne's father frequently told her about his memories of traveling on bayous and lazy rivers. Dunne's favorite family vacations were riverboat rides and parades, later recalling a voyage from St. Louis to New Orleans, and watching boats on the Ohio River from the hillside. She admitted, "No triumph of either my stage or screen career has ever rivaled the excitement of trips down the Mississippi on the riverboats with my father."

Dunne was an avid golfer, playing the sport since high-school graduation; her husband and she often played against each other and twice she made a hole in one. They often socialized with Californian business people, but she was good friends with Loretta Young, Jimmy Stewart, Bob Hope, Rosalind Russell, Van Johnson, Ronald Reagan, Carole Lombard, and George Stevens Jr., and became godmother to Young's son, Peter. Her friendship with Charles Boyer in Love Affair was genuine off the set; they wrote essays about each other in the October issue of Photoplay. Dunne also bonded with Leo McCarey over numerous similar interests, such as their Irish ancestry, music, religious backgrounds, (Note: McCarey was a guilty lapsed Catholic, however.) and humor. School friends nicknamed her "Dunnie" and she was referred to as this in Madison High School's 1916 yearbook, along with the description "divinely tall and most divinely fair." John Cromwell, however, reportedly described her as "always [having] the look of a cat who had swallowed the canary."

Dunne was popular with co-workers off-camera, earning a reputation as warm and approachable, and having a "poised, gracious manner" like royalty, which spilled into her persona in movies. On observing life behind the scenes of a typical day of filming in Hollywood, Jimmie Fidler noted, "There is something about Irene Dunne that makes every man in the room unconsciously straighten his tie." Dunne earned the nickname "The First Lady of Hollywood" because "she was the first real lady Hollywood has ever seen," said Leo McCarey, with Gregory La Cava adding, "If Irene Dunne isn't the first lady of Hollywood, then she's the last one." Ironically, this title had been bestowed on her when she was a little girl when an aunt cooed "What a little lady!" When approached about the nickname in 1936, Dunne admitted it had grown tiresome but approved if it was meant as "the feminine counterpart of 'gentleman'"; a later interview she did have with the Los Angeles Times would ironically be titled "Irene Dunne, Gentlewoman."

Her fashion tastes were often the talk of newspapers, and Best Dressed lists featured her as one of the most stylish celebrities in the world. Dunne explained in a 1939 fashion-advice interview that her husband was partially responsible because he was equally stylish, but also that she chose an outfit based on her personality, the color scheme, and where it would be worn. McCall's magazine later revealed Dunne chose outfits specifically designed for her by Mainbocher and Jean Louis because she did not like buying clothes in stores.

One of Dunne's later public appearances was in April 1985, when she attended the unveiling of a bronze bust in her honor at St. John's Hospital and Health Clinic. The artwork, commissioned by the hospital from artist Artis Lane, has a plaque reading "IRENE DUNNE First Lady Of Saint John's Hospital and Health Center Foundation."

=== Relationships ===
Between 1919 and 1922, Dunne was close to Fritz Ernst, a businessman based in Chicago who was 20 years older than she, and a member of one of the richest families in Madison, Indiana. They frequently corresponded while Dunne was training for musical theater but when Fritz proposed, Dunne declined, due to pressure from her mother and wanting to focus on acting. They remained friends and continued writing letters until Ernst died in 1959.

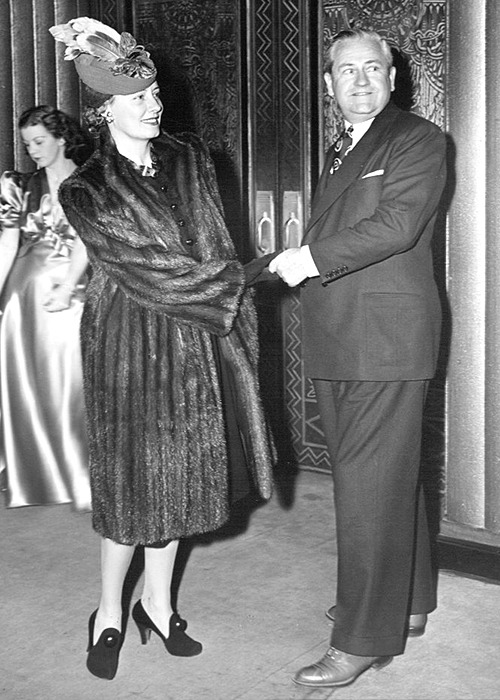
Dunne with husband, Dr. Francis Griffin

At a New York, Biltmore Hotel supper party in 1924, Dunne met Northampton, Massachusetts-born dentist Francis Griffin (born December 24, 1883). According to Dunne, he preferred being a bachelor, yet tried everything he could to meet her. To her frustration, he did not telephone her until over a month later, but the relationship strengthened and they married in Manhattan on July 13, 1927. They had constantly argued about the state of their careers if they ever got married, with Dunne agreeing to consider theater retirement sometime in the future and Griffin agreeing to support Dunne's acting. Griffin later explained: "I didn't like the moral tone of show business. [...] Then Ziegfeld signed her for Show Boat and it looked like she was due for big things. Next came Hollywood and [she] was catapulted to the top. Then I didn't feel I could ask her to drop her career. [I] really didn't think marriage and the stage were compatible but we loved each other and we were both determined to make our marriage work."

When Dunne decided to star in Leathernecking, it was meant to be her only Hollywood project, but when it was a box-office bomb, she took an interest in Cimarron. Soon after, she and her mother moved to Hollywood and maintained a long-distance relationship with her husband and brother in New York until they joined her in California in 1936. A family friend described Dunne and Griffin's dynamic as "like two pixies together," and they remained married until Griffin's death on October 14, 1965, living in the Holmby Hills in a "kind of French Chateau" they designed. (Note: Considered out-of-date, the home was demolished after Dunne's death.) A hobby they shared was astronomy. Griffin explained the marriage had lasted so long because: "When she had to go on location for a film I arranged my schedule so I could go with her. When I had to go out of town she arranged her schedule so she could be with me. We co-operate in everything. [...] I think a man married to a career woman in show business has to be convinced that his wife's talent is too strong to be dimmed or put out. Then, he can be just as proud of her success as she is and, inside he can take a bow himself for whatever help he's been." Due to Dunne's privacy, (Note: Dunne's indifference about giving interviews was revealed to be the result of shyness. She did not like attending Hollywood parties and was paranoid about interviewers asking about an uncomfortably invasive topic, describing it as like living in a glass house. "There are talented people who can talk amusingly, charmingly, blithely about themselves to friends, acquaintances and strangers on the slightest provocation [and I] find myself not only enjoying but envying them," she later explained. This apathy was interpreted as snobbery, at first, and is partially why her "ladylike" reputation stuck.) Hollywood columnists struggled to find scandals to write about her—an eventual interview with Photoplay included the disclaimer, "I can guarantee no juicy bits of intimate gossip. Unless, perhaps she lies awake nights heartsick about the kitchen sink in her new home. She's afraid it's too near to the door. Or would you call that juicy? No? No, I thought not." When the magazines alleged that Dunne and Griffin would divorce, Griffin released a statement denying any marital issues.

After retiring from dentistry, Griffin became Dunne's business manager and helped negotiate her first contract. The couple became interested in real estate, later investing in the Beverly Wilshire and throughout Las Vegas (including co-founding and chairing the board of Huntridge Corporation), and partnering with Griffin's family's businesses (Griffin Equipment Company and The Griffin Wellpoint Company.) Griffin sat as a board member of numerous banks, but his offices were relocated from Century City to their home after his death, when Dunne took over as president. They had one daughter, Mary Frances (née Anna Mary Bush; 1935 (Note: Birth originally reported as 1932.) – 2020), who was adopted by the couple in 1936 (finalized in 1938) from the New York Foundling Hospital, run by the Sisters of Charity of New York.

=== Religion ===
Dunne was a devout Catholic laywoman who became a daily communicant. She was a member of the Church of the Good Shepherd and the Catholic Motion Picture Guild in Beverly Hills, California. In 1953, Pope Pius XII awarded Dunne and her husband papal knighthoods as Dame (Note: Initially reported as "Lady", the true rank is actually "Dame," but "Lady" is sometimes used colloquially. See Order of the Holy Sepulchre#Ranks for more information.) and Knight of the Holy Sepulchre, respectively. Griffin also became a Knight of Malta in 1949.

== Death ==
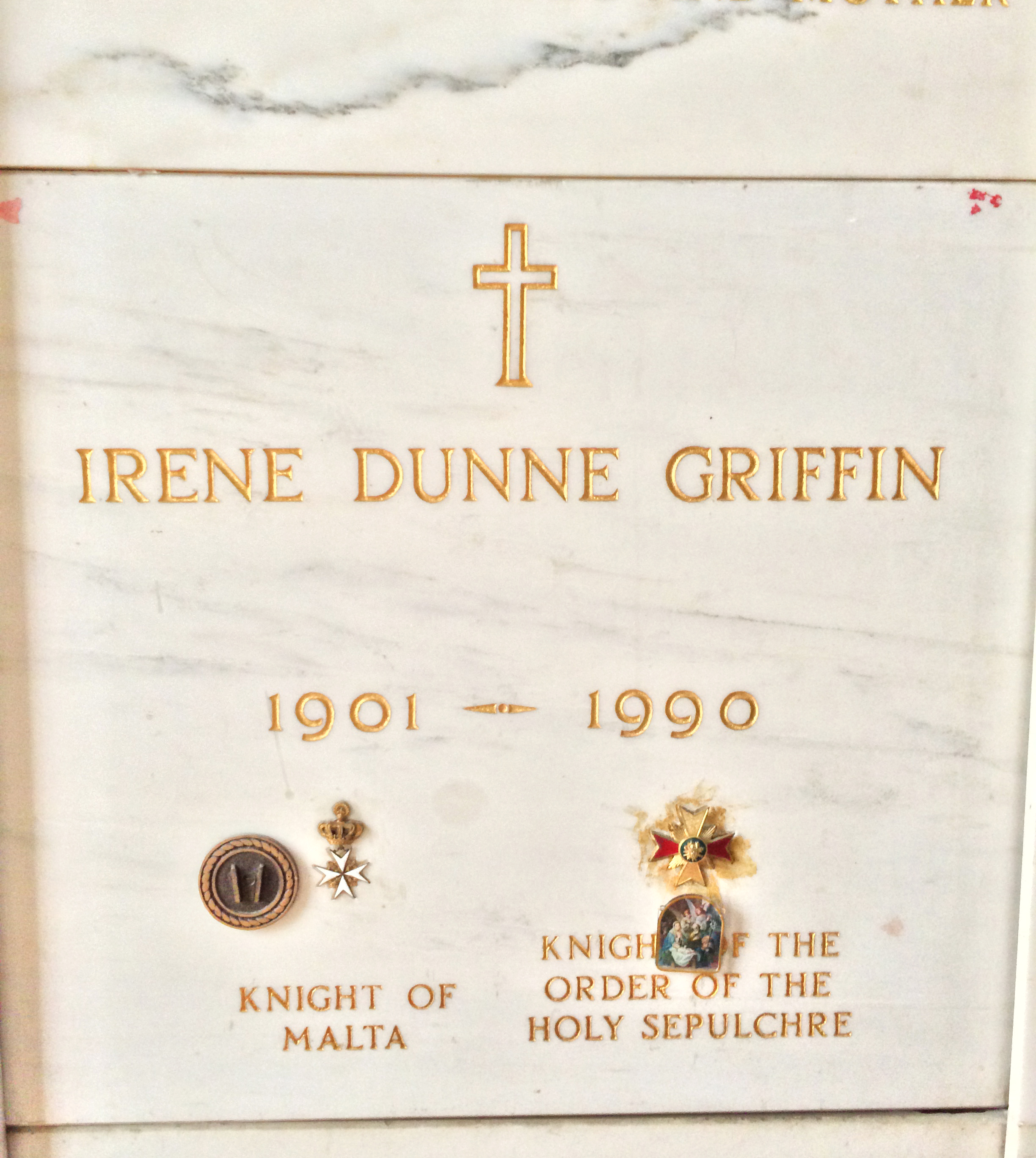
Crypt of Irene Dunne at Calvary Cemetery (notice incorrect birth year)

Dunne died at the age of 91 in her Holmby Hills home on September 4, 1990, and was entombed four days later next to her husband in the Calvary Cemetery, East Los Angeles. She had been unwell for a year with an irregular heartbeat, and became bedridden about a month before. The funeral was private with family friend Loretta Young being the only celebrity allowed to attend. Her personal papers are housed at the University of Southern California.

== Legacy ==
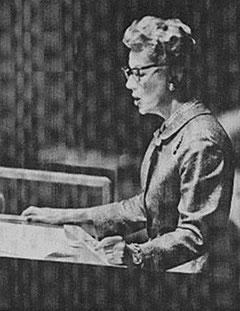
Dunne addresses the United Nations General Assembly in 1957 about the United States' $21.8 million donation towards the United Nations Relief and Works Agency for Palestine Refugees (UNRWA).

Dunne is considered one of the best actresses of The Golden Age of Hollywood never to win an Academy Award. After I Remember Mama was released, Liberty magazine hoped she would "do a Truman" at the 1949 Oscars whereas Erskine Johnson called her and Best Actor nominee Montgomery Clift the dark horses of that ceremony. In 1985, Roger Fristoe said "a generation of filmgoers is mostly unfamiliar with her work" because eleven of her movies had been remade, including Love Affair (remade as An Affair to Remember), Show Boat (remade in 1951), My Favorite Wife (remade as Move Over, Darling), and Cimarron (remade in 1960). Dunne explained she had lacked the "terrifying ambition" of some other actresses, commenting in 1977, "I drifted into acting and drifted out. Acting is not everything. Living is."

Notable remakes of Dunne's films
- Cimarron: 1960 remake
- Back Street: 1961 remake
- Roberta: Lovely to Look At (1952)
- Magnificent Obsession: 1954 remake
- Show Boat: 1951 remake
- The Awful Truth: Let's Do It Again (1953)
- Love Affair: An Affair to Remember (1957)
- When Tomorrow Comes: Interlude (1957)
- My Favorite Wife: Move Over, Darling (1963)
- A Guy Named Joe: Always (1989)
- Anna and the King of Siam: The King and I (1956)

Although known for her comedic roles, Dunne admitted that she never saw comedy as a worthy genre, even leaving the country to attend the London premiere of Show Boat with her husband and James Whale to get away from being confronted with a script for Theodora Goes Wild. "I never admired a comedienne," she said retrospectively, "yet it was very easy for me, very natural. It was no effort for me to do comedy at all. Maybe that's why I wasn't so appreciative of it." She ascribed her sense of humor to her late father, as well as her "Irish stubbornness." Her screwball comedy characters have been praised for their subversions to the traditional characterisation of female leads in the genre, particularly Susan (Katharine Hepburn) in Bringing Up Baby and Irene (Carole Lombard) in My Man Godfrey. "Unlike the genre's stereotypical leading lady, who exhibits bonkers behaviour continuously, Dunne's screwball heroine [in Theodora Goes Wild] chooses when she goes wild," writes Wes D. Gehring, who also described Dunne's screwball as situational because her characters often obfuscate wackiness to attract the male lead, and could turn it off when needed.

Biographers and critics argue that Dunne's groundedness made her screwball characters more attractive than those of her contemporaries. In his review for My Favorite Wife, Bosley Crowther wrote that a "mere man is powerless" to "her luxurious and mocking laughter, her roving eyes and come-hither glances." Maria DiBattista points out that Dunne is the "only comic actress working under the strictures of the Production Code" who ends both of her screwball movies alongside Cary Grant with a heavy implication of sharing a bed with him, "under the guise of keeping him at bay." Frankie Teller claimed Dunne's sexiness had been overshadowed by her melodramatic movies until The Awful Truth was released. Meanwhile, outside of comedy, Andrew Sarris theorized that Dunne's sex appeal is due to the common narrative in her movies about a good girl "going bad." Dunne's backstage "First Lady" reputation furthered Sarris' sex appeal claims, admitting the scene when she shares a train carriage with Preston Foster in Unfinished Business was practically his "rite of passage" to a sex scene in a film, theorizing that the sex appeal of Dunne came from "a good girl deciding thoughtfully to be bad." On the blatant eroticism of the same train scene, Megan McGurk wrote, "The only thing that allowed this film to pass the censors was that good-girl Irene Dunne can have a one-night stand with a random because she loves him, rather than just a once-off fling. For most other women of her star magnitude, you could not imagine a heroine without a moral compass trained on true north. Irene Dunne elevates a tawdry encounter to something justifiably pure or blameless. She's just not the casual sex type, so she gets away with it."

The Los Angeles Times referred to Dunne's publicity in their obituary as trailblazing, noting her as one of the first actors to become a freelancer in Hollywood during its rigid studio system through her "non-exclusive contract that gave her the right to make films at other studios and to decide who should direct them," and her involvement with the United Nations as a decision that allowed entertainers from movies and television to branch out into philanthropy and politics, such as Ronald Reagan and George Murphy.

Dunne later said, "Cary Grant always said that I had the best timing of anybody he ever worked with." Lucille Ball admitted at an American Film Institute seminar that she based her comedic skills on Dunne's performance in Joy of Living, Joan Leslie called her an "outstanding example as a woman and a star." Charles Boyer described her having "an irrepressible youthfulness" and Ralph Bellamy described working in three films with her as "like a three-layered cake with candles[. She was] truly professional, extremely talented, and socially attractive and beautiful." When asked about life after retiring from baseball, Lou Gehrig stated he would want Dunne as a screen partner if he ever became a movie actor. Charles Mendl once called her one of the most attractive and fascinating women in the world "who has beauty as an accomplished actress and sophisticated conversationalist." Dunne told James Bawden in 1977: "Now don't you dare call me normal. I was never a Pollyanna. There was always a lot of Theodora in me."

In 2006, a historical marker was erected on 105 E. Main Street in Madison, Indiana, to honor her contributions to the state.

== Awards and nominations ==
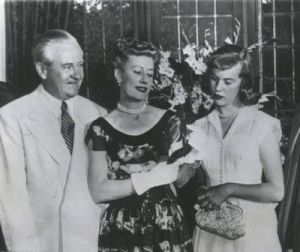
Dunne looking at her Laetare Medal with her husband and daughter, Mary Frances, at the University of Notre Dame in 1949.

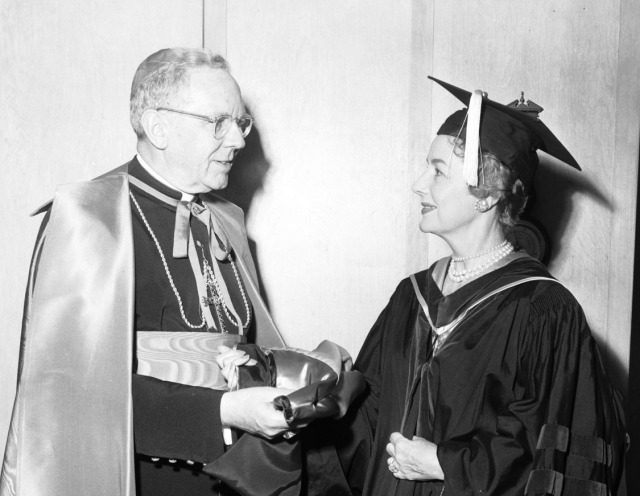
Dunne with Cardinal McIntyre at Loyola University's graduation ceremony in 1958. She attended to accept her honorary Law degree and give a commencement speech.

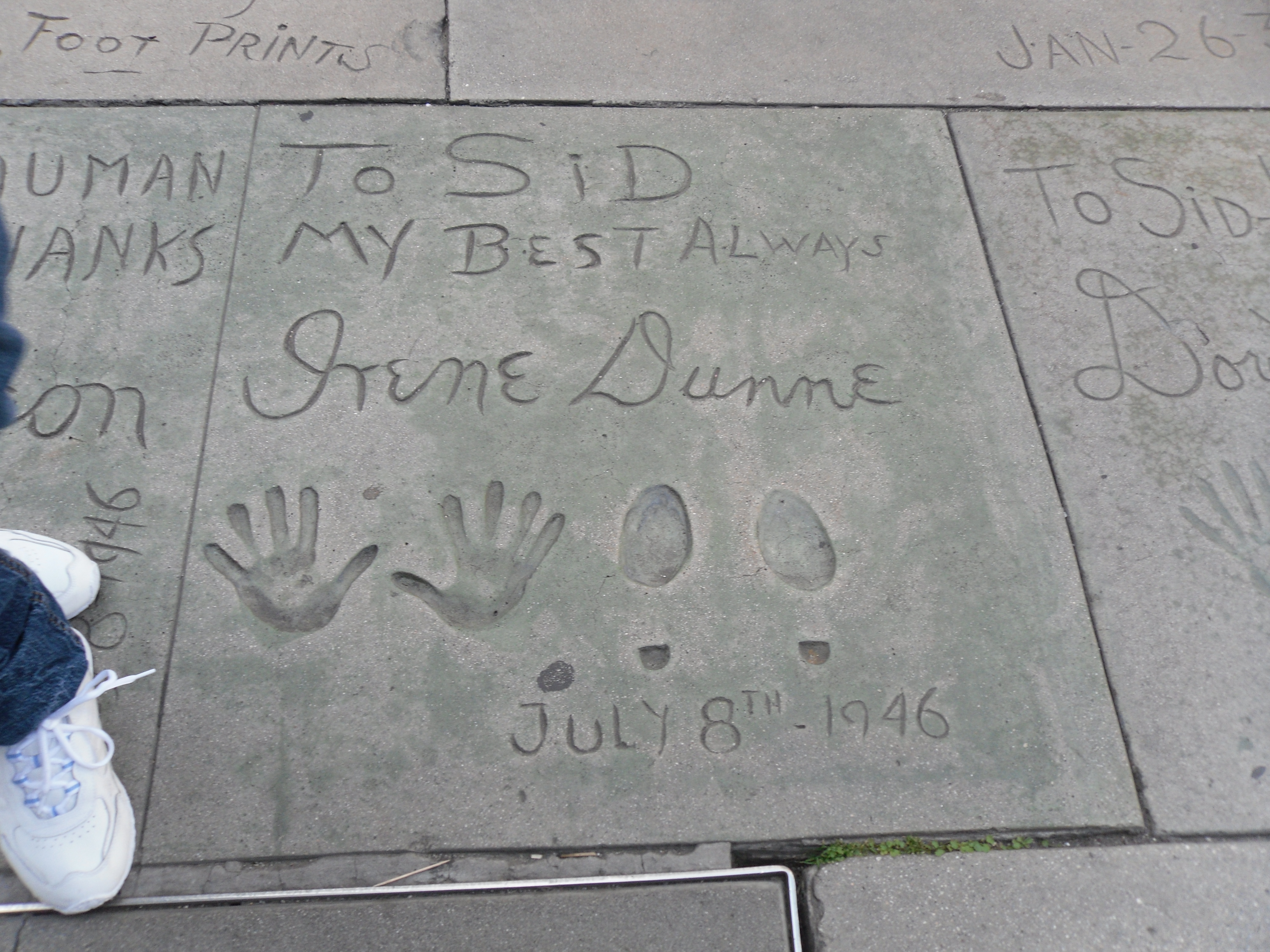
Dunne's handprints outside Grauman's Chinese Theatre.

Dunne received five Best Actress nominations during her career: for Cimarron (1931), Theodora Goes Wild (1936), The Awful Truth (1937), Love Affair (1939) and I Remember Mama (1948); she was the first actor to lose against the same actor in the same category twice, losing to Best Actress winner Luise Rainer in 1936 and 1937. When asked if she ever resented never winning, Dunne pointed out that the nominees she was up against had strong support, believing that she would never have had a chance, especially when Love Affair was against Gone with the Wind. "I don't mind at all," she told Joyce Haber, "Greta Garbo never got an Oscar either [and] she's a living legend."

However, Dunne was honored numerous times for her philanthropy from Catholic organizations and schools, receiving the University of Notre Dame's Laetare Medal, and the Bellarmine Medal from Bellarmine College. She received numerous honorary doctorates, including from Chicago Musical College (for music), Loyola University and Mount St. Mary's College (both for Law). For her film career, she was honored by the Kennedy Center, a star on the Hollywood Walk of Fame at 6440 Hollywood Blvd, and displays in the Warner Bros. Museum and Center for Motion Picture Study. A two-sided marker was erected in Dunne's childhood hometown of Madison in 2006.

Received honors
Award	Year	Ref(s)
American Society for the Hard of Hearing's Best Diction Award	1936	
Chicago Musical College honorary Doctor of Music	1945	
Grauman's Chinese Theatre Handprints	1946	
NCCJ's American Brotherhood Award	1948	
Laetare Medal	1949	
American Heart Association Gold Medal	1949	
Protestant Motion Picture Council Award (Note: Shared with the cast and crew of I Remember Mama.)	1949	
American Motherhood Pictures Award	1949	
Woman's Voice of the Year	1949	
Lateran Cross	1951	
Los Angeles Times Woman of the Year	1951	
New York Dress Institute's International Best Dressed Women	1951	
Dame of the Holy Sepulchre	1953	
Honorary member of the Madison Chamber of Commerce	1954	
International Best Dressed List	1958	
Indiana's Woman of the Year	1958	
Loyola University honorary Law degree	1958	
Seattle University honorary Law degree	1959	
St. Mary's College honorary Law degree	1964	
Bellarmine Medal	1965	
Mannequins of the Assistance League of Southern California's Golden Eve Award	1967	
Colorado Women of Achievement	1968	
St. John's Hospital and Health Center's Lifetime Trustee	1982	
Irene Dunne Guild bust	1985	
Kennedy Center Honoree	1985	

== Performances ==
Irene Dunne credits details her film, television and radio credits.

== Box–office ranking ==
- 1936: 17th
- 1938: 23rd
- 1939: 24th
- 1944: 19th
- 1948: 24th

== Discography ==
"Lovely to Look At" was the only song Dunne performed in a non-musical movie that entered the Billboard charts, peaking at number 20 in early June 1935.

Year	Single	Credits	Format	Labels (serial number)	Ref.
1935	"When I Grow Too Old to Dream"/"Lovely to Look At"	Performed with Nat Shilkret's orchestra; Recorded April 4 in New York; Top 20 single	78 rpm	Brunswick Records (7420, 02048); Columbia Records (DB-1805); Epic Records (SN-6059)	

Decca Records released Dunne's only album, titled Irene Dunne in Songs from the Pen of Jerome Kern, (Note: Also known as Songs by Jerome Kern, Jerome Kern Songs, Irene Dunne in Songs by Jerome Kern, and Irene Dunne Souvenir Album.) which contained recordings of six show tunes composed by Jerome Kern. It was recorded between July 16 and August 24, 1941, with Victor Young's orchestra, making Dunne another singing movie star to create a Jerome Kern album.

== See also ==
- List of actors with Academy Award nominations
- List of actors with Hollywood Walk of Fame motion picture stars
- Jean Arthur

== Sources ==
- Gehring, Wes D. (2003). Slide, Anthony (ed.). Irene Dunne: First Lady of Hollywood. Lanham, Maryland: Scarecrow Press. ISBN 978-0810858640.
- Fristoe, Roger (December 15, 1985). "Louisville's Own: Irene Dunne". Courier Journal – via Newspapers.com.
- Irene Dunne (February 17, 1945). "Hats, Hunches and Happiness". Picturegoer. England. Archived from the original on February 4, 2011.
- Dunne, Irene (1985). "Screening of the Past: A Rare Interview with Irene Dunne" (Interview). Interviewed by John McDonough. Archived from the original on March 17, 2019.
- Dunne, Irene (1978). "Interview with James Harvey, September 1978" (Interview). Interviewed by James Harvey. Archived from the original on August 14, 2013.
- "The Irene Dunne Site: The Pre-Hollywood Years – 1898–1929". ;
- Schultz, Margie (1991). Irene Dunne: A Bio-Bibliography. Bio-Bibliographies in the Performing Arts. Greenwood Press. ISBN 978-0-313-27399-5.
- Birmingham, Stephen (1964). "What Have They Done to... Irene Dunne". McCall's. No. August 1964. p. 100. Archived from the original on June 13, 2016.
- Bell, Joseph N. (January 12, 1958). "Irene Dunne: Saleslady for the U.N." Family Weekly. pp. 4–5 – via Newspapers.com.
- William Frye (2004). "Everyone Loved Irene". Vanity Fair. Archived from the original on August 16, 2016.
- Dr. Annette Bochenek (September 3, 2015). "Irene Dunne | Hometowns to Hollywood". Hometowns to Hollywood. Archived from the original on May 16, 2020.
- Don Ward (March 2006). "Irene Dunne's career was a true success story". Roundabout Entertainment Guide. Kentuckianana Publishing Inc. Archived from the original on August 1, 2020.
