= Together Again (film) =

1944 comedy film directed by Charles Vidor

- Directed by: Charles Vidor
- Screenplay by: Virginia Van Upp; F. Hugh Herbert
- Story by: Herbert Biberman
- Produced by: Virginia Van Upp
- Cinematography: Joseph Walker
- Edited by: Otto Meyer
- Music by: Werner R. Heymann
- Production company: Columbia Pictures
- Distributed by: Columbia Pictures
- Release date: December 22, 1944
- Running time: 93 minutes
- Country: United States
- Language: English

Together Again is a 1944 comedy film directed by Charles Vidor and starring Irene Dunne and Charles Boyer. The screenplay was written by F. Hugh Herbert and Virginia Van Upp, based on story by Herbert J. Biberman and Stanley Russell. The supporting cast features Charles Coburn and Mona Freeman.

== Plot ==
Anne Crandall succeeds her husband as mayor of Brookhaven, Vermont, when he dies. She takes her duties as mayor seriously, and after five years of faithful service, her father-in-law, Jonathan Crandall, begins to worry about her health and her social life since she spends most of her waking hours at the office.

Jonathan interprets a lightning bolt's beheading a statue of the former mayor as a sign from his late son that enough is enough. Despite this, Anne travels to New York City to commission a new statue of her late husband from a sculptor, Georg Corday. Her life takes a curve when she meets the sculptor, who is very interested in this soulful young woman, whom he finds out has been married to a much older man.

Georg takes Anne out to dinner, and they are attracted to each other. Anne even helps Georg win a bet that he can guess her weight, by adjusting the scale. Later, they go to Leonardo's, a nightclub where a striptease show is in progress, featuring dancer Gilda La Verne.

The evening with Georg moves Anne's circles, and she is upset about his observations and thoughts about her previous life. Eventually, she spills food on her dress, and goes to the ladies' room to attend to the spot. She takes off her dress to be cleaned; while it is being ironed by a helpful attendant, the police raid the club. Gilda flees to the ladies' room, snatches up the dress, and escapes through a window.

When the police enter the room, they mistake Anne for the stripper, and arrest her. A horde of newspaper photographers follow the police, and Anne gets her picture taken, half-naked, covering her face, claiming her name is P. Borat Sosa – a name she saw somewhere in Georg's studio.

Anne returns to Brookhaven and tells everyone that the sculptor was too busy to make the sculpture. Jonathan is not so easily fooled, and asks Anne many questions about her whereabouts and business in the city. Eventually she admits where she was and that she was arrested for indecency.

Her stepdaughter Diana, who was really keen on the making of a new sculpture, is very disappointed when she hears the news. Anne tries to avoid further suspicion about her dealings with the sculptor by describing him as an ugly old man. Unfortunately, Georg turns up at the Crandall home, and charms both Diana and Jonathan, and they invite him to stay with them until the sculpture is finished.

Anne makes a deal with Georg, that he keep quiet about the arrest if he can work on the statue for one week. While the work progresses, both Anne and Diana become more and more attracted to Georg, behaving more and more strangely to catch his attention.

When Anne and Georg are at the stonecutter's, a rainstorm makes them take cover under a statue of Cupid. Georg tells Anne he is in love with her and tries to kiss her, but Diana arrives in a car to take them both home.

Later that evening, Georg tells Jonathan about his love for Anne, and Jonathan confides that Anne has promised Diana never to remarry. Georg is prompted to ask Diana's permission to pursue Anne. Georg tries to talk to Diana, but she mistakes his talk about love and marriage as a declaration of love towards her, instead.

Diana soon tells the others about her engagement to Georg, and her boyfriend Gilbert Parker goes to Anne for advice. They decide to make Diana jealous with Anne faking being in love with Gilbert.

Jonathan tries to throw Anne and Georg in each other's arms, by telling Anne's major opponent in the mayoral elections, Morton Buchanan, about Anne's arrest in New York. The next day, the story is in the papers, and Diana realizes that Anne and Georg had something going back in the city. Diana tells Georg to marry Anne and "make an honest woman" of her.

Despite the story of the arrest, the townspeople elect Anne as mayor. Georg, having completed the statue, goes back to New York City.

On a stormy night, Anne and Jonathan get into an argument about her letting Georg go. Another lightning bolt hits and beheads the statue. The townspeople interpret this a sign for Anne to step down. She does, and then rejoices at her new freedom, but Jessie, the housekeeper, tells Jonathan that Georg made the statue so that the head would fall off.

Anne goes to New York to reconcile with Georg, but in the hall outside his door, she overhears him telling his model how he rigged the statue, and turns away. Then, thunder and lightning erupt outside, and Anne turns again toward Georg's door.

== Cast ==
- Irene Dunne – Anne Crandall
- Charles Boyer – Georg Corday
- Charles Coburn – Jonathan Crandall, Sr.
- Mona Freeman – Diana Crandall
- Jerome Courtland – Gilbert Parker
- Elizabeth Patterson – Jessie
- Charles Dingle – Morton Buchanan
- Carl Switzer – Elevator Boy (uncredited)
- Nina Mae McKinney - Maid in nightclub powder room (uncredited)
- Shelley Winters - Woman fleeing nightclub raid (uncredited)

Other uncredited roles include Frank Puglia, Janis Carter, Adele Jergens, Virginia Sale, Virginia Brissac, Ferris Taylor, Constance Purdy, and Hobart Cavanaugh.

== Development ==
Irene Dunne and Charles Boyer had previously acted together in Love Affair and When Tomorrow Comes, both released in 1939. Audiences enjoyed their partnership, and critics supported it, despite When Tomorrow Comes receiving many negative reviews. Both actors had become close friends after performing and were eager to act in another film, but the war effort had overshadowed their careers. Dunne toured the United States with several actors to sell war bonds and had starred in war films, whereas Boyer was fulfilling a nine-film contract with Universal Pictures and was making appearances on the radio, both voice acting in dramas and encouraging French speakers to also help the war effort. In 1944, Harry Cohn discovered numerous viewer polls from cinephiles and women's clubs that revealed many missed Dunne and Boyer appearing onscreen together and began planning a new film for the pair with Columbia. A Woman's Privilege was a screenplay considered for Jean Arthur, but the title was changed to "Together Again" to make purposeful parallels to audience desires.

Filming took place in the summer of 1944. The set was relaxed, although there was tension between Boyer and Charles Coburn over the election. Dunne said in a promotional interview she was not present during retakes and that Together Again reminded her of Theodora Goes Wild, a screwball comedy she starred in also distributed by Columbia Pictures.

== Reception ==
"The Dunne-Boyer combination is a guarantee of deft handling of any such light humors as the picture offers," said New York World-Telegram.

Variety wrote: "Miss Dunne and Boyer competently team in the top spots—she as the pursued and he as the pursuer in the love match."

"[Dunne and Boyer] play their parts to the hilt," said the New York Morning Telegraph.

"In bringing Irene Dunne and Charles Boyer together again yesterday," said New York Times, "Columbia Pictures has fashioned a buoyant, featherweight entertainment that is eminently suited to its principals' talents[.] Miss Dunne and Mr. Boyer are [altogether] diverting, and so is Together Again."

== Radio adaptation ==
Together Again was twice adapted as a one-hour radio play on Lux Radio Theatre. On December 9, 1946 Dunne reprised her role from the film; Walter Pidgeon also starred in this adaptation. For the May 10, 1955 version Maureen O'Hara played the lead.

== Bibliography ==
- Gehring, Wes D. (2006). Irene Dunne: First Lady of Hollywood. Lanham, MD: Scarecrow Press. ISBN 978-0810858640.
- Swindell, Larry (1983). Charles Boyer: The Reluctant Lover (first ed.). Garden City, N.Y. ISBN 0385170521.
