= Let's Take a Walk Around the Block =

"Let's Take a Walk Around the Block" is a popular song composed by Harold Arlen, with lyrics written by Ira Gershwin and E.Y. Harburg.

It was introduced in the musical review Life Begins at 8:40. The original Broadway production opened at the Winter Garden Theatre on August 27, 1934 and closed on March 16, 1935 after a run of 237 performances.

== Notable recordings ==
- Jackie and Roy - Storyville Presents Jackie and Roy (Storyville Records, 1955)
- Doris Day - included in her album Cuttin' Capers (1959)
- Bing Crosby and Rosemary Clooney recorded the song for their radio show in 1960 and it was subsequently released on the CD Bing & Rosie - The Crosby-Clooney Radio Sessions (2010).
- Ella Fitzgerald - Ella Fitzgerald Sings the Harold Arlen Songbook (Verve Records, 1961)
- Mel Tormé - Mel Tormé & George Shearing - The Complete Concord Recordings (2002).
