= Sing My Heart =

1939 song by Harold Arlen and Ted Koehler

"Sing My Heart" is a song composed by Harold Arlen, with lyrics written by Ted Koehler. It was written in 1939 for the movie Love Affair and first sung by Irene Dunne.

== Notable recordings ==
"Sing My Heart"
Snippet of Irene Dunne performing the song in Love Affair

- Will Osborne & His Orchestra - recorded for Decca on February 15, 1939 (catalog No. 2335B).
- Ella Fitzgerald - Ella Fitzgerald Sings the Harold Arlen Songbook (1961)
- Lena Horne - The Men in My Life (1988)
