= The City Chap (musical) =

1925 comedy

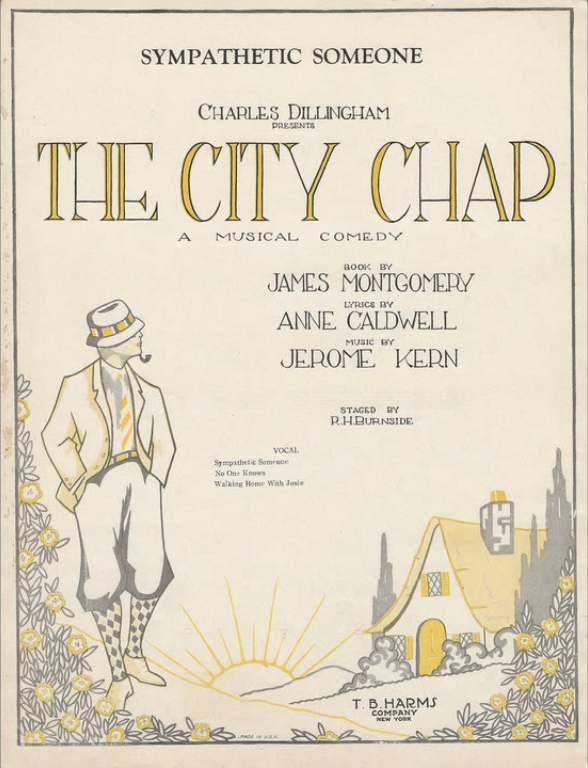
- Sheet Music Cover
- Music: Jerome Kern
- Lyrics: Anne Caldwell
- Book: James Montgomery
- Basis: The Fortune Hunter by Winchell Smith
- Productions: 1925 Broadway

The City Chap is a musical comedy with music by Jerome Kern, lyrics by Anne Caldwell and book by James Montgomery adapted from the play The Fortune Hunter by Winchell Smith.

== Production ==
The City Chap premiered on Broadway on October 26, 1925, at Liberty Theatre, and closed on December 26, 1925, after 72 performances. It was produced by Charles Dillingham, directed by R. H. Burnside, designed by James Reynold, choreographed by David Bennett, orchestrated by Robert Russell Bennett and conducted by Victor Baravalle. The Cast featured Richard Gallagher as Nat Duncan, Phyllis Cleveland as Betty, Ina Williams as Josie, Irene Dunne as Grace, and George Raft as George.

In 1986 the show was given a concert production featuring the entire original score.

== Plot summary ==
Nat Duncan, the City Chap, decides to forsake the hedonistic city lifestyle and become an upstanding citizen in a small, dull, town. He moves to Radford, NY, where he takes a job at Sam Graham's dilapidated drugstore, eventually transforming it through hard work into a successful, modern, tea-room, which features jazz and liquor. Nat intends to marry the rich Josie Lockwood, but realizes that he is really in love with Betty, Graham's daughter, and he proposes to her after all complications have been sorted out a party, thrown by his friend Grace, at Saratoga.

== Musical Numbers ==
Act I

- "Like the Nymphs of Spring" - Grace Bartlett and Ensemble
- "The Go-Getter" - Stephen Kellogg, Grace Bartlett, and Girls
- "Journey's End" - Nat Duncan
- Finaletto Scene I - Ensemble
- "Sympathetic Someone" - Betty Graham and Nat Duncan
- "The City Chap" - Pete, Watty, Roland Barnett, and Josie Lockwood
- "He is the Type" - Josie Lockwood, Betty Graham, and Girls
- Double Reprise of "Journey's End" and "He is the Type" - Nat Duncan, Betty Graham, Josie Lockwood, and Angie
- "If You Are As Good As You Look" (cut midway through run) - Nat Duncan, Josie Lockwood, and Angie
- "The Tanglefoot" (not in programs) - Josie Lockwood and Ensemble
- Finale Act I - Watty, Pete, Betty Graham, Roland Barnett, and Ensemble

Act II

- "The Fountain of Youth" - Lucy Monroe, Miss Sperry, Angie, Danzi Goodell, Girls and Mound City Blue Blowers
- "A Pill a Day" - Roland Barnett and Josie Lockwood
- "Walking Home with Josie" - Nat Duncan, Josie Lockwood, Tracey Tanner, Angie, Sam Graham, Pete, Roland Barnett, Pearl, Boys and Girls
- "No One Knows" (cut midway through run) - Betty Graham, Stephen Kellogg, Nat Duncan and Grace Bartlett
- "Bubbles of Bliss" (replaced with "Saratoga" midway through run) - Angie, Roland Barnett, George Spelvin, and Ensemble
- Specialty/"Journey's End" (Reprise) - Marjorie Moss, Georges Fontana, George Olsen and his Band
- "When I Fell In Love" (cut midway through run) - Stephen Kellogg, Betty Graham, Nat Duncan and Grace Bartlett
- Finale Ultimo (Reprise of "Journey's End" or "The Go-Getter") - Ensemble
