= Ted Koehler =

American lyricist (1894–1973)

- Born: July 14, 1894; Washington, D.C., U.S.
- Died: January 17, 1973 (aged 78) Santa Monica, California, U.S.
- Genres: Traditional pop; jazz; musical theatre
- Occupation: Lyricist
- Instrument: Piano
- Years active: 1920s–1940s
- Formerly of: Harold Arlen; Jimmy McHugh; Rube Bloom; Harry Warren; Sammy Fain

Ted L. Koehler (July 14, 1894 – January 17, 1973) was an American lyricist. He was inducted into the Songwriters Hall of Fame in 1972.

== Life and career ==
Koehler was born in Washington, D.C., in 1894.

He started out as a photo-engraver, but was attracted to the music business, where he started out as a theater pianist for silent films.

He moved on to write for vaudeville and Broadway theatre, and he also produced nightclub shows.

His most successful collaboration was with the composer Harold Arlen, with whom he wrote many famous songs from the 1920s through the 1940s. In 1929, the duo composed their first well-known song, "Get Happy", and went on to write "Let's Fall in Love", "Stormy Weather", "Sing My Heart", and other hit songs. Throughout the early and mid-1930s they wrote for the Cotton Club, a popular Harlem night club, for big band jazz legend Duke Ellington and other top performers, as well as for Broadway musicals and Hollywood films.

Koehler also worked with other composers, including Jimmy McHugh, Rube Bloom, Harry Warren, and Sammy Fain.

Koehler died in 1973 in Santa Monica, California, at the age of 78.

== Songs ==
- "Animal Crackers in My Soup" – music by Ray Henderson
- "As Long as I Live" – music by Harold Arlen
- "Between the Devil and the Deep Blue Sea" – music by Harold Arlen
- "Don't Worry 'bout Me" – music by Rube Bloom
- "Moon over Dixie" – music by Duke Ellington and His Famous Orchestra
- "Get Happy" – music by Harold Arlen
- "I Can't Face the Music" – music by Rube Bloom
- "I Gotta Right to Sing the Blues" – music by Harold Arlen
- "Ill Wind" – music by Harold Arlen
- "I'm Shooting High" – music by Jimmy McHugh
- "I've Got My Fingers Crossed" – music by Jimmy McHugh
- "I've Got the World on a String" – music by Harold Arlen
- "Let's Fall in Love" – music by Harold Arlen
- "Minnie the Moocher's Wedding Day" – music by Harold Arlen
- "Out in the Cold Again" – music by Rube Blume
- "Sing My Heart" – music by Harold Arlen
- "Some Sunday Morning" – music by M. K. Jerome and Ray Heindorf
- "Spreadin' Rhythm Around" – music by Jimmy McHugh
- "Stormy Weather" – music by Harold Arlen
- "When the Sun Comes Out" – music by Harold Arlen
- "Wrap Your Troubles in Dreams" – music by Harry Barris, lyrics with Billy Moll

== Work on Broadway ==
- Earl Carroll's Vanities of 1932 (1932) – revue; co-composer and co-lyricist with Harold Arlen
- Say When (1934) – musical; lyricist
- Now I Know (1944) – musical; lyricist
