= Theodora Goes Wild =

1936 film by Richard Boleslawski

- Theatrical release poster
- Directed by: Richard Boleslawski
- Screenplay by: Sidney Buchman
- Story by: Mary McCarthy
- Produced by: Everett Riskin
- Starring: Irene Dunne; Melvyn Douglas
- Cinematography: Joseph Walker
- Edited by: Otto Meyer
- Music by: Arthur Morton; William Grant Still; (both uncredited)
- Distributed by: Columbia Pictures
- Release date: November 12, 1936
- Running time: 94 minutes
- Country: United States
- Language: English
- Box office: $1.1 million

Theodora Goes Wild is a 1936 American screwball comedy film that tells the story of the residents in a small town who are incensed by a risqué novel, unaware that the book was written under a pseudonym by a member of the town's leading family. It stars Irene Dunne and Melvyn Douglas and was directed by Richard Boleslawski. The film was written by Mary McCarthy and Sidney Buchman. Dunne was nominated for an Academy Award as Best Actress in a Leading Role and the movie was also nominated for the Best Film Editing.

Before this film, Dunne had been cast in dramatic films. Theodora Goes Wild was her first comedy, and this extremely popular film proved to be the beginning of a new phase in her film career as a screen comedienne.

== Plot ==
Theodora Lynn is a Sunday school teacher and former church organist in Lynnfield, Connecticut, raised by two spinster aunts, Mary and Elsie Lynn. She also happens to be, under the pen name Caroline Adams, the secret author of a sensational, bestselling book replete with sexual innuendo that has the straight-laced all-female Lynnfield Literary Circle in an uproar. The book is serialized in the local newspaper, and the Literary Circle, led by outraged busybody Rebecca Perry, forces the newspaper's owner Jed Waterbury to stop printing the salacious installments.

Theodora travels to New York City on the pretext of visiting her black sheep Uncle John, but actually goes to see her publisher Arthur Stevenson. Though Stevenson reassures an anxious Theodora that only he and his secretary know her identity, his wife Ethel pressures him into an introduction, which the book's illustrator Michael Grant overhears. Intrigued, Michael invites himself to a sumptuous dinner with the Stevensons and Theodora. Theodora becomes annoyed when Michael smugly assumes that she is a teetotaler, so she orders a whiskey. As the night goes on, she becomes drunk. So does Ethel, forcing Arthur to take her home and leaving Theodora alone with Michael in the posh restaurant. When he brings her to his apartment and then makes a pass at her, she panics and flees, much to his amusement.

Michael tracks her to her hometown, and his whistling is immediately noticed outside her house. Because she technically is not supposed to know anyone outside of Lynnfield, he coerces her into hiring him as a gardener, thus scandalizing her aunts and providing Rebecca Perry with ample information for gossip. Michael declares that he is going to break Theodora out of her confining routine, ignoring her protests that she likes her life just the way it is. Despite herself, she enjoys herself when Michael makes her go berry-picking and fishing with him. Finally, she finds the nerve to tell the disapproving women of the Literary Circle that she loves him. When she tells Michael what she has done, however, he is less than thrilled.

The next morning, Theodora finds that he has gone back to New York and left her. She tracks him to his Park Avenue apartment. He admits he loves her, but then his father, the lieutenant governor, shows up, followed by Michael's estranged wife Agnes. Lt. Gov. Grant tells his son Michael that he and Agnes must remain married to avoid causing a political scandal for him. Michael is unable to stand up to his father.

Theodora determines to free Michael from his father, just as he had done for her. He wants her to hold off until his father's term ends in two years, but she is unwilling to wait that long. She courts publicity by revealing herself as the true Caroline Adams. She stays in Michael's New York apartment, even though he has moved out to get away from her, and she tells the press of her intention to publish a new book that details finding romance in her small town and searching for someone who will call her "baby" – a story that depicts her relationship with Michael. Meanwhile, Michael denies to the press that he has even met Theodora. She finally crashes the governor's ball and arranges for reporters to photograph her embracing Michael. Agnes seeks a divorce from Michael to save face.

Theodora returns to Lynnfield and is warmly welcomed as a celebrity, even by her now-supportive aunts. She causes further talk when she brings a newborn baby with her. When Michael, now divorced, sees the child, he tries to flee, but then Theodora reveals that the baby belongs to Rebecca Perry's own secretly married daughter, and not to her.

== Cast ==
- Irene Dunne as Theodora Lynn / Caroline Adams
- Melvyn Douglas as Michael Grant
- Thomas Mitchell as Jed Waterbury
- Thurston Hall as Arthur Stevenson
- Elisabeth Risdon as Aunt Mary Lynn
- Margaret McWade as Aunt Elsie Lynn
- Spring Byington as Rebecca Perry
- Nana Bryant as Ethel Stevenson
- Henry Kolker as Jonathan Grant
- Leona Maricle as Agnes Grant
- Robert Greig as Uncle John Lynn
- Frederick Burton as Governor Wyatt
- Rosalind Keith as Adelaide Perry (uncredited)
- William 'Billy' Benedict as Henry, newspaper boy (uncredited)

== Reception ==
Writing for The Spectator in 1937, Graham Greene gave the film a good review, comparing the film's light comedy to Mr. Deeds Goes to Town, and commenting that Dunne's acting had been "regroomed" and improved considerably since her earlier films and that she now "appears as one of the best comedians on the screen".

== Radio adaptations ==
The Lux Radio Theater presented a radio adaptation of the film on June 13, 1938. The cast featured Irene Dunne and Cary Grant who played the Melvyn Douglas part.

Orson Welles adapted the story for his Mercury Theatre players for a January 14, 1940 episode of The Campbell Playhouse, with Loretta Young as Theodora.
