= Sweet Adeline (1934 film) =

1934 film by Mervyn LeRoy

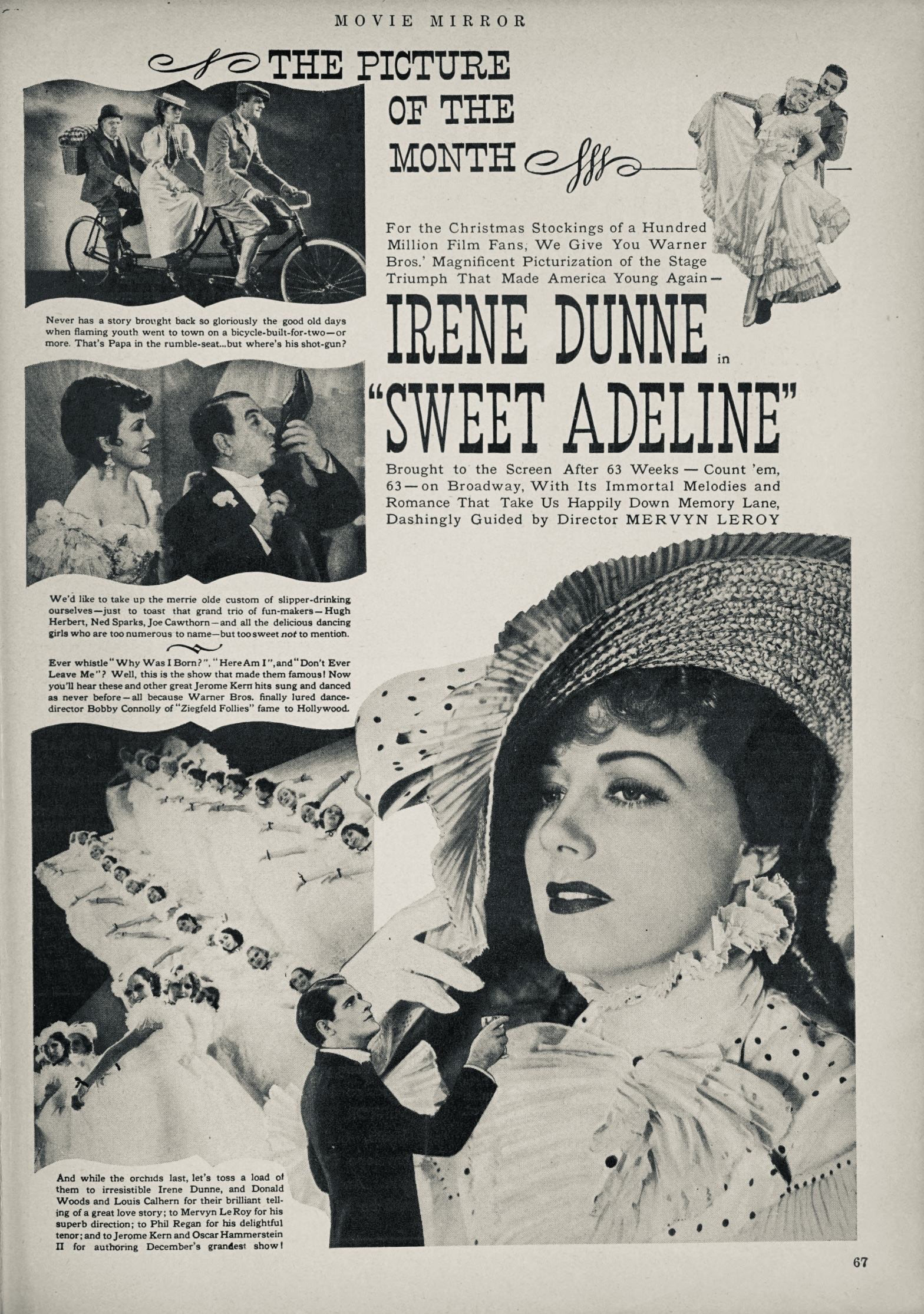
- Directed by: Mervyn LeRoy
- Written by: Erwin S. Gelsey
- Based on: Sweet Adeline; 1929 musical by Jerome Kern and Oscar Hammerstein II
- Produced by: Edward Chodorov
- Starring: Irene Dunne; Donald Woods
- Cinematography: Sol Polito
- Edited by: Ralph Dawson; Harold McLernon (uncredited)
- Music by: Heinz Roemheld (uncredited)
- Production company: Warner Bros. Pictures
- Distributed by: Warner Bros. Pictures; The Vitaphone Corporation
- Release date: December 29, 1934
- Running time: 82-95 minutes
- Country: United States
- Language: English

Sweet Adeline is a 1934 musical film adaptation of the 1929 Jerome Kern/Oscar Hammerstein II Broadway play of the same title. It stars Irene Dunne and Donald Woods and was directed by Mervyn LeRoy.

== Plot ==
Sid Barnett, a young composer, is in love with Adeline Schmidt, the daughter of a beer garden owner, but her father Oscar dislikes him, preferring the Spanish-American War hero Major Day. Because Schmidt is completely opposed to show business, Adeline's sister Nellie runs away to New York, hoping to pursue a career as an actress. Adeline goes after her.

When Sid sees Adeline, he insists that she is the only one who can sing the songs in his new operetta. After she shows she has talent to the director, he agrees to replace Spanish actress Elysia. Because sponsor Rupert Rockingham will only finance the play if Elysia stars, Day steps in and offers to back the play with Adeline as the star. During rehearsals, Adeline and Sid quarrel, and she starts spending more time with Day. Meanwhile, Rockingham has discovered that Elysia is a spy. He plans to keep her identity secret because of his love for her, but Nellie convinces him that she is really the right woman for him. When Day proposes that Adeline become his mistress in return for his support of the play, she is insulted and announces that she will not go on stage after all. Sid pleads with her not to ruin his first operetta and she finally agrees, making Elysia very jealous. During the performance, Elysia injures Adeline seriously and the play closes. Adeline and Sid are still not speaking until during another rehearsal, director Dan Herzig teases them into kissing each other.

== Cast ==
- Irene Dunne as Adeline [Schmidt]
- Donald Woods as Sid Barnett
- Hugh Herbert as Rupert Rockingham
- Ned Sparks as Dan Herzig
- Joseph Cawthorn as Oscar Schmidt
- Wini Shaw as Elysia (as Winifred Shaw)
- Louis Calhern as Major Day
- Nydia Westman as Nellie
- Dorothy Dare as Dot
- Phil Regan as Singer

== Songs ==
Music by Kern and lyrics by Hammerstein, unless otherwise indicated.

- "Sweet Adeline", music by Henry W. Armstrong, lyrics by Richard Husch Gerard, sung by Hugh Herbert and Donald Wood
- "We Were So Young", sung by Irene Dunne, then a second time by Dunne, Phil Regan and a chorus
- "Play Us a Polka Dot", sung by Dorothy Dare and others
- "Here Am I", sung by Dunne
- "A Hot Time in the Old Town Tonight", music by Theodore Metz, lyrics by Joe Hayden, sung by beer garden patrons
- "Why Was I Born?", sung first by Wini Shaw, then by Dunne
- "Oriental Moon", sung by Noah Beery
- "Molly O'Donahue", sung by Regan
- "Lonely Feet", sung by Dunne alone, then later by Dunne and a chorus
- "I'd Leave My Happy Home For You", music by Harry Von Tilzer, lyrics by Will A. Heelan, sung by Johnny Eppelite
- "'Twas Not So Long Ago", sung by Joseph Cawthorn, Dunne, Regan, Herbert and Nydia Westman
- "Pretty Little Jenny Lee", sung by a barbershop quartet
- "Don't Ever Leave Me", sung by Dunne

== Reception ==
The New York Times critic Andre Sennwald panned the film, writing, "except for the lovely Kern-Hammerstein music and one or two blazing production numbers in the best Warner Brothers style of extravaganza, 'Sweet Adeline' appears to snore in dulcet measures".
